= Once a Sinner =

Once a Sinner may refer to:

- Once a Sinner (1950 film), a British drama film
- Once a Sinner (1931 film), an American pre-Code romance film
