= Man Bait =

Man Bait may refer to:

- The Last Page, a 1952 British film noir, released in the United States as Man Bait
- Man Bait (1926 film), an American silent comedy film
