= The Son-Daughter =

1932 film

- Theatrical release poster
- Directed by: Clarence Brown; Robert Z. Leonard
- Screenplay by: John F. Goodrich; Claudine West; Leon Gordon
- Based on: The Son-Daughter by George Scarborough; David Belasco (play)
- Produced by: Clarence Brown
- Starring: Helen Hayes; Ramon Novarro; Lewis Stone; Warner Oland; Ralph Morgan
- Cinematography: Oliver T. Marsh
- Edited by: Margaret Booth
- Music by: Herbert Stothart
- Production company: Metro-Goldwyn-Mayer
- Distributed by: Loew's Inc.
- Release date: December 23, 1932
- Running time: 79 minutes
- Country: United States
- Language: English

The Son-Daughter is a 1932 American pre-Code drama film directed by Clarence Brown and written by John F. Goodrich, Claudine West, and Leon Gordon, adapted from the play of the same name by David Belasco. The film stars Helen Hayes, Ramon Novarro, Lewis Stone, Warner Oland, and Ralph Morgan. The film was released on December 23, 1932, by Metro-Goldwyn-Mayer.

== Plot ==
In San Francisco's Chinatown, Tom Lee, a Chinese prince disguised as student, is in love with Lien Wha during unrest between opposing groups of the Chinese community.

== Cast ==
- Helen Hayes as Lien Wha
- Ramon Novarro as Tom Lee
- Lewis Stone as Dr. Dong Tong
- Warner Oland as Fen Sha
- Ralph Morgan as Fang Fou Hy
- Louise Closser Hale as Toy Yah
- H. B. Warner as Sin Kai

== Reception ==
According to André Soares' biography on Navarro, Beyond Paradise, "[The star] earned only scant good notices when [The Son-Daughter] opened on December 23, 1932"; and despite Navarro's leading man status in Hollywood at the time, "The picture itself received overwhelmingly negative reviews".
