= John F. Goodrich =

American screenwriter

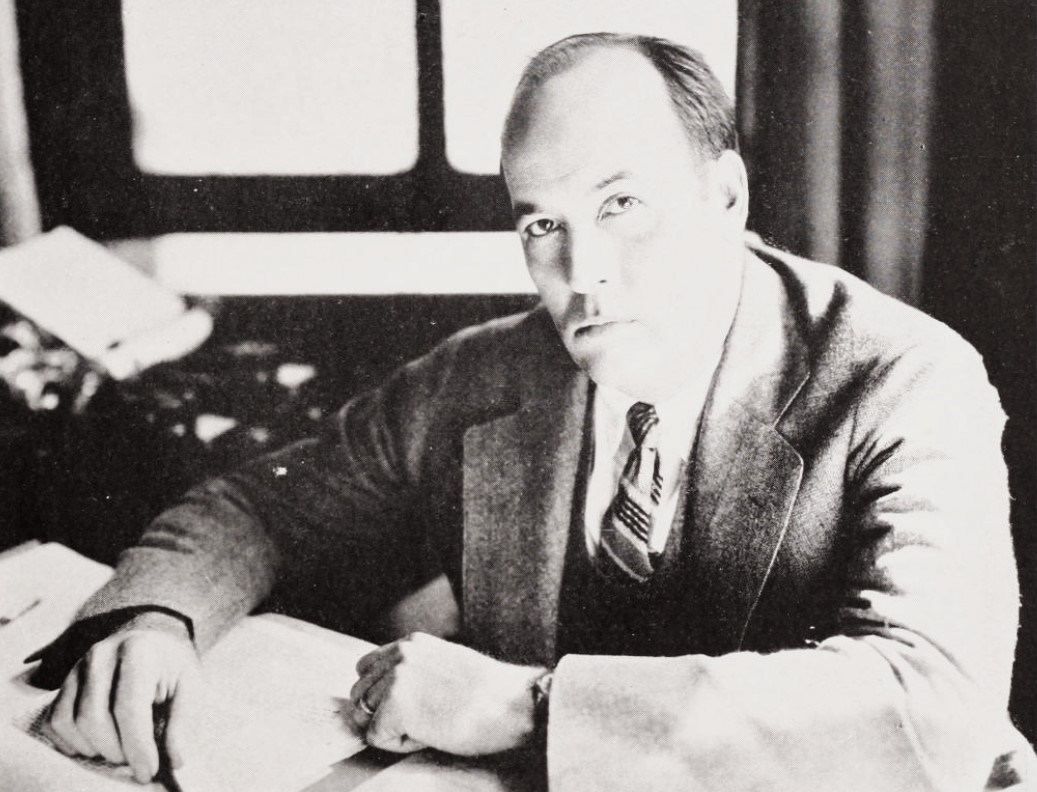
- From a 1926 magazine
- Born: February 18, 1887; Delavan, Wisconsin, United States
- Died: March 11, 1937 (aged 50); Los Angeles, California, United States
- Occupation: Screenwriter
- Years active: 1923–1936 (film)

John Fish Goodrich (February 18, 1887 – March 11, 1937) was an American screenwriter of the silent and early sound era. He worked for a variety of different studios. In 1928 he co-wrote The Last Command.

== Filmography ==
- Daytime Wives (1923)
- Thundering Dawn (1923)
- The Triflers (1924)
- My Lady's Lips (1925)
- Capital Punishment (1925)
- The Boomerang (1925)
- The Other Woman's Story (1925)
- Faint Perfume (1925)
- Puppets (1926)
- Special Delivery (1927)
- Shanghai Bound (1927)
- The Rough Riders (1927)
- The Last Command (1928)
- The Vanishing Pioneer (1928)
- Fast Life (1929)
- The Love Racket (1929)
- Lilies of the Field (1930)
- The Flirting Widow (1930)
- Riders of the Purple Sage (1931)
- The Son-Daughter (1932)
- Breach of Promise (1932)
- Flaming Gold (1933)
- Deluge (1933)
- Life Returns (1935)
- The Healer (1935)
- Crack-Up (1936)

== Bibliography ==
- Eagan, Daniel. America's Film Legacy: The Authoritative Guide to the Landmark Movies in the National Film Registry. A&C Black, 2010.
- Solomon, Aubrey. The Fox Film Corporation, 1915-1935: A History and Filmography. McFarland, 2011.
