= Wilfred Lytell =

American film actor (1891–1954)

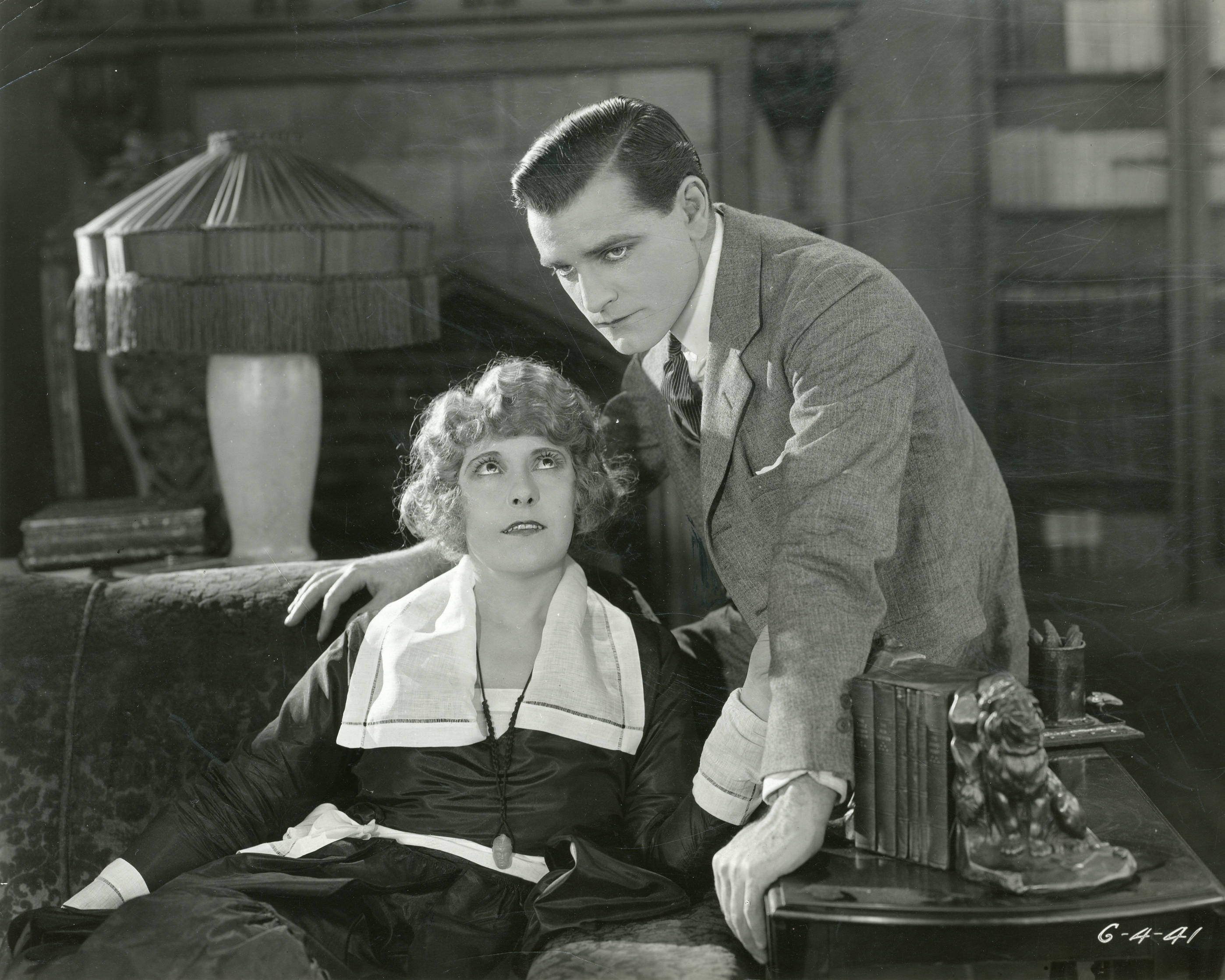
- Wilfred Lytell and Pearl White in Know Your Men (1921)
- Born: William Lyttel, Jr. October 16, 1891; New York City, U.S.
- Died: September 10, 1954 (aged 62); Salem, New York, U.S.
- Resting place: Evergreen Cemetery (Brooklyn, New York City), New York
- Occupation: Actor
- Years active: 1916–1951
- Spouse(s): Jessie Mueller; Elizabeth McClellan Dustin
- Children: 1
- Relatives: Bert Lytell (brother)

Wilfred Lytell Jr. (October 16, 1891 – September 10, 1954) was an American film actor.

== Biography ==
Lytell was born in New York City, New York and appeared in 35 films between 1915 until 1952.

On November 29, 1923, while working the film The Warrens of Virginia in San Antonio, Texas, actress Martha Mansfield was severely burned when a tossed match ignited her Civil War costume. Having completed her scenes, she had returned to the car. When her clothing burst into flames, Lytell, who was the leading actor, threw his heavy overcoat over her and her chauffeur's hands were severely burned from trying to remove her burning clothing. The fire was put out, but she sustained substantial burns to her body and succumbed to her injuries the next day.

He died in Salem, New York, on September 10, 1954. His brother, actor Bert Lytell, died on September 28, just 18 days after his brother's death.

== Partial filmography ==
- The Conflict (1916)
- Freddy's Narrow Escape (1916)
- The Combat (1916) (uncredited)
- Our Mrs. McChesney (1918)
- Thunderbolts of Fate (1919)
- The Fatal Hour (1920)
- Heliotrope (1920)
- The Harvest Moon (1920)
- Know Your Men (1921)
- The Man Who Paid (1922)
- The Fair Cheat (1923)
- The Leavenworth Case (1923)
- The Warrens of Virginia (1924)
- The Trail of the Law (1924)
- Bluebeard's Seven Wives (1926)
