= Crashing Through Danger =

1938 film

- Ray Walker and Sally Blane in Crashing Through Danger (1938)
- Directed by: Sam Newfield
- Written by: Norman Houston
- Produced by: Sigmund Neufeld; Leslie Simmonds
- Starring: Ray Walker; Sally Blane; Guinn "Big Boy" Williams
- Cinematography: James S. Brown Jr.
- Edited by: John English
- Music by: Howard Jackson
- Production company: Excelsior Pictures
- Distributed by: Excelsior Pictures
- Release date: September 11, 1938
- Running time: 70 minutes
- Country: United States
- Language: English

Crashing Through Danger is a 1938 American romantic comedy drama film directed by Sam Newfield and starring Ray Walker, Sally Blane and Guinn "Big Boy" Williams.

== Plot ==
Three electrical linemen work through the hazardous conditions of the Great Depression era. Tension ensues when Ann Foster comes between them, and they move in together following the accidental death of her father, who was also their supervisor.

== Cast ==
- Ray Walker as Torchy
- Sally Blane as Ann Foster
- Guinn "Big Boy" Williams as Slim
- James Bush as Eddie
- Guy Usher Superintendent Carter
- Robert Homans as Pop Foster
- Syd Saylor as Tom
- Dick Curtis as Foreman

Stanley Fields appears uncredited.
