= The Man Who Paid =

1922 film by Oscar Apfel

- Directed by: Oscar Apfel
- Written by: Marion Brooks
- Starring: Wilfred Lytell; Norma Shearer; Florence Rogan
- Distributed by: Producer's Security
- Release date: March 1922
- Running time: 5 reels
- Country: United States
- Language: Silent (English intertitles)

The Man Who Paid is a 1922 American silent drama film directed by Oscar Apfel and starring Wilfred Lytell, Norma Shearer, and Florence Rogan.

== Plot ==
As described in a film magazine, Oliver Thornton (Lytell), after serving a prison term on the false accusation of having embezzled bank funds, seeks to forget in the wilds of the north and secures a position as an agent for a far northern trading company. There he falls in love with Jeanne and marries her. A baby girl, Little Jeanne (Rogan), is born to the young couple. Louis Duclos (Jones), an unscrupulous trapper and former suitor of Jeanne, learns somehow of Oliver's prison record and attempts to estrange Jeanne from her husband. Failing in this, he plans to put Oliver away and kidnap the wife while also stealing the papers showing the location of a silver mine that Oliver and his brother Guy (Byer) have found. Guy has arrived with proof of Oliver's innocence of the embezzling charge, and the two are on a fishing trip when Jeanne is kidnapped. Warned by an Indian, the brothers race to the assistance of Jeanne, and after a series of adventures during which Louis is killed by an Indian he has injured, and Jeanne is rescued. Now with his name cleared of the charge and rich from the silver mine, Oliver is asked by Guy to return to the city and take up his business career. After some struggle with his ambition, Oliver elects to remain in the woods, happy in the love of his wife and child.

== Cast ==
- Wilfred Lytell as Oliver Thornton
- Norma Shearer as Jeanne Thornton
- Florence Rogan as Little Jeanne
- Fred C. Jones as Louis Duclos
- Bernard Siegel as Anton Barbier
- David Hennessy as McNeill
- Charles Byer as Guy Thornton
- Erminie Gagnon as Lizette
- Frank Montgomery as Songo

== Bibliography ==
- Jack Jacobs & Myron Braum. The films of Norma Shearer. A. S. Barnes, 1976.
