= Know Your Men =

1921 film by Charles Giblyn

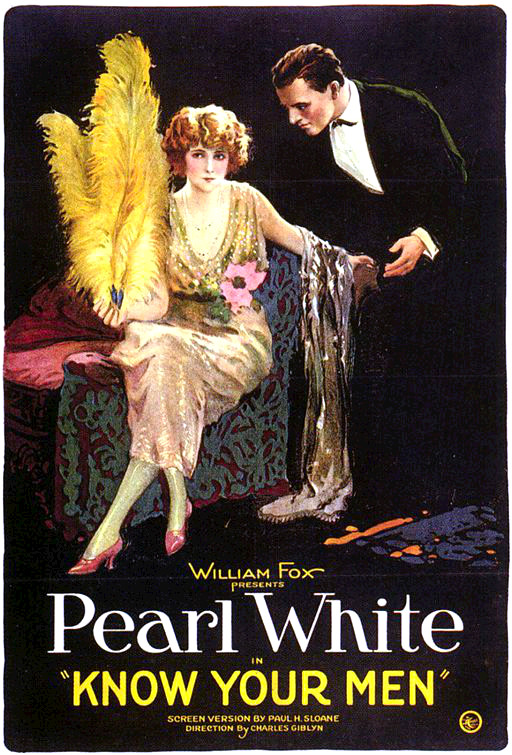
- Film poster
- Directed by: Charles Giblyn
- Written by: Paul Sloane (aka Paul H. Sloane)
- Produced by: William Fox
- Starring: Pearl White
- Cinematography: Joseph Ruttenberg
- Distributed by: Fox Film Corporation
- Release date: March 13, 1921
- Running time: 6 reels; 5,315 feet
- Country: United States
- Language: Silent (English intertitles)

Know Your Men is a 1921 American silent melodrama film produced and distributed by Fox Film Corporation, directed by Charles Giblyn, and starring Pearl White. It is now considered to be a lost film.

== Plot ==
As described in a film publication summary, Ellen is in love with Roy Phelps, but marries Warren Schuyler, who is a good man, to protect her father's honor. Roy later returns and rekindles her love, and Ellen goes with him. However, she soon discovers his villainy, and, penitent, returns and is taken back by her husband, whom she now realizes she loves.

== Cast ==
- Pearl White as Ellen Schuyler
- Wilfred Lytell as Roy Phelps
- Downing Clarke as Warren Schuyler
- Harry C. Browne as John Barrett
- Estar Banks as Mrs. Barrett
- Byron Douglas as Van Horn
- William Eville as Watson

== See also ==
- 1937 Fox vault fire
