= City Limits (1934 film) =

1934 film by William Nigh

- Film poster
- Directed by: William Nigh
- Written by: George Waggner (adaptation and screenplay); Jack Woodford (novel City Limits)
- Produced by: William T. Lackey (producer)
- Cinematography: Jerome Ash
- Edited by: Jack Ogilvie
- Music by: William Schiller; Oliver Wallace
- Production company: William T. Lackey Productions
- Distributed by: Monogram Pictures
- Release date: April 15, 1934
- Running time: 67 minutes
- Country: United States
- Language: English

City Limits is a 1934 American Pre-Code romantic comedy film directed by William Nigh and starring Frank Craven, Sally Blane, Ray Walker and Claude Gillingwater. It was remade in 1941 as Father Steps Out.

== Plot ==
J.B. Matthews, the president of a railroad, has grown tired of his doctors. After falling off his train, he meets a pair of hoboes, King and Napoleon, who show him how to enjoy life and good cooking. Reporter Jimmy Dugan and Helen set out to find him and bring him back before a rival can ruin him.

== Cast ==
Ray Walker and Sally Blane in City Limits (1934)

- Frank Craven as J.B. Matthews
- Sally Blane as Helen Matthews
- Ray Walker as Jimmy Dugan
- Claude Gillingwater as Oliver
- James Burke as King
- Jimmy Conlin as Nap
- Jane Keckley as Aunt Martha
- Henry Roquemore as Macy
- Harry C. Bradley as Dr. Stafford
- George "Gabby" Hayes as Carter
- George Cleveland as Graflex
- George Nash as Jones
- Fern Emmett as Mrs. Benton
- Henry Hall as Stockbroker (uncredited)
