= Red Hot Speed =

1929 film

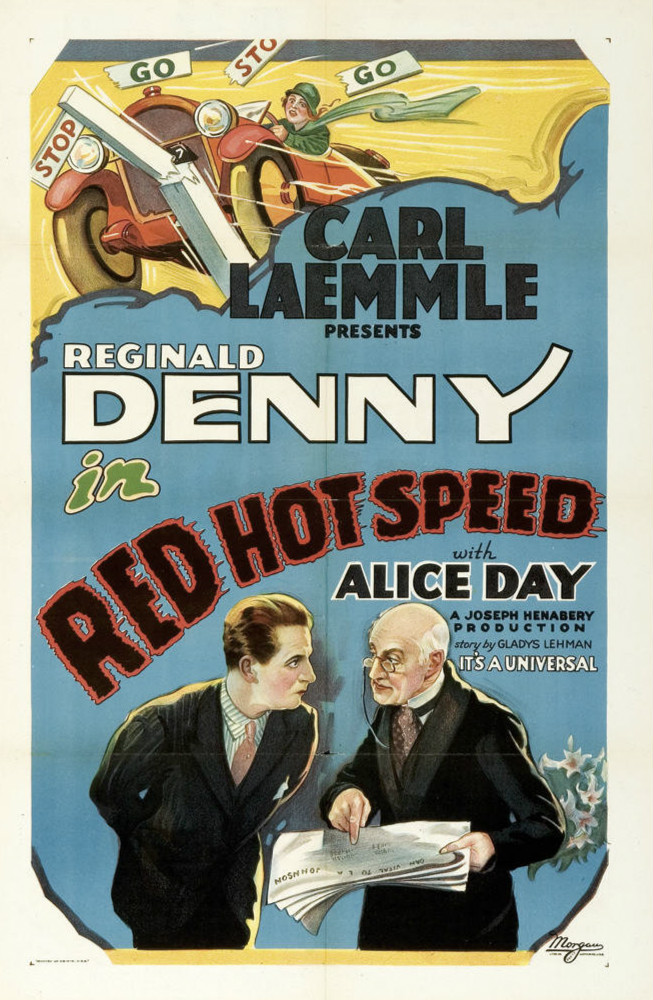
- Directed by: Joseph Henabery
- Written by: Albert DeMond; Gladys Lehman; Matt Taylor; Faith Thomas
- Produced by: Carl Laemmle
- Starring: Reginald Denny; Alice Day; Charles Byer
- Cinematography: Arthur L. Todd
- Edited by: Ray Curtiss; John English
- Production company: Universal Pictures
- Distributed by: Universal Pictures
- Release date: January 27, 1929
- Running time: 60 minutes
- Country: United States
- Languages: Sound (Part-Talkie); English Intertiles

Red Hot Speed is a 1929 American sound part-talkie comedy film directed by Joseph Henabery and starring Reginald Denny, Alice Day and Charles Byer. In addition to sequences with audible dialogue or talking sequences, the film features a synchronized musical score and sound effects along with English intertitles. The sound was recorded using the Western Electric Sound System.

== Synopsis ==
The daughter of a newspaper owner is arrested for speeding. To avoid embarrassing her father, who is in the middle of an anti-speeding campaign, she gives a false name to the authorities. She is then turned over to the district attorney who is unaware of her real identity.

== Cast ==
- Reginald Denny as Darrow
- Alice Day as Buddy Long
- Charles Byer as George
- Tom Ricketts as Colonel Long
- DeWitt Jennings as Judge O'Brien
- Fritzi Ridgeway as Slavey
- Hector V. Sarno as Italian father

== See also ==
- List of early sound feature films (1926–1929)

== Bibliography ==
- George A. Katchmer. Eighty Silent Film Stars: Biographies and Filmographies of the Obscure to the Well Known. McFarland, 1991.
