= David Watson (actor) =

American actor (1940–2014)

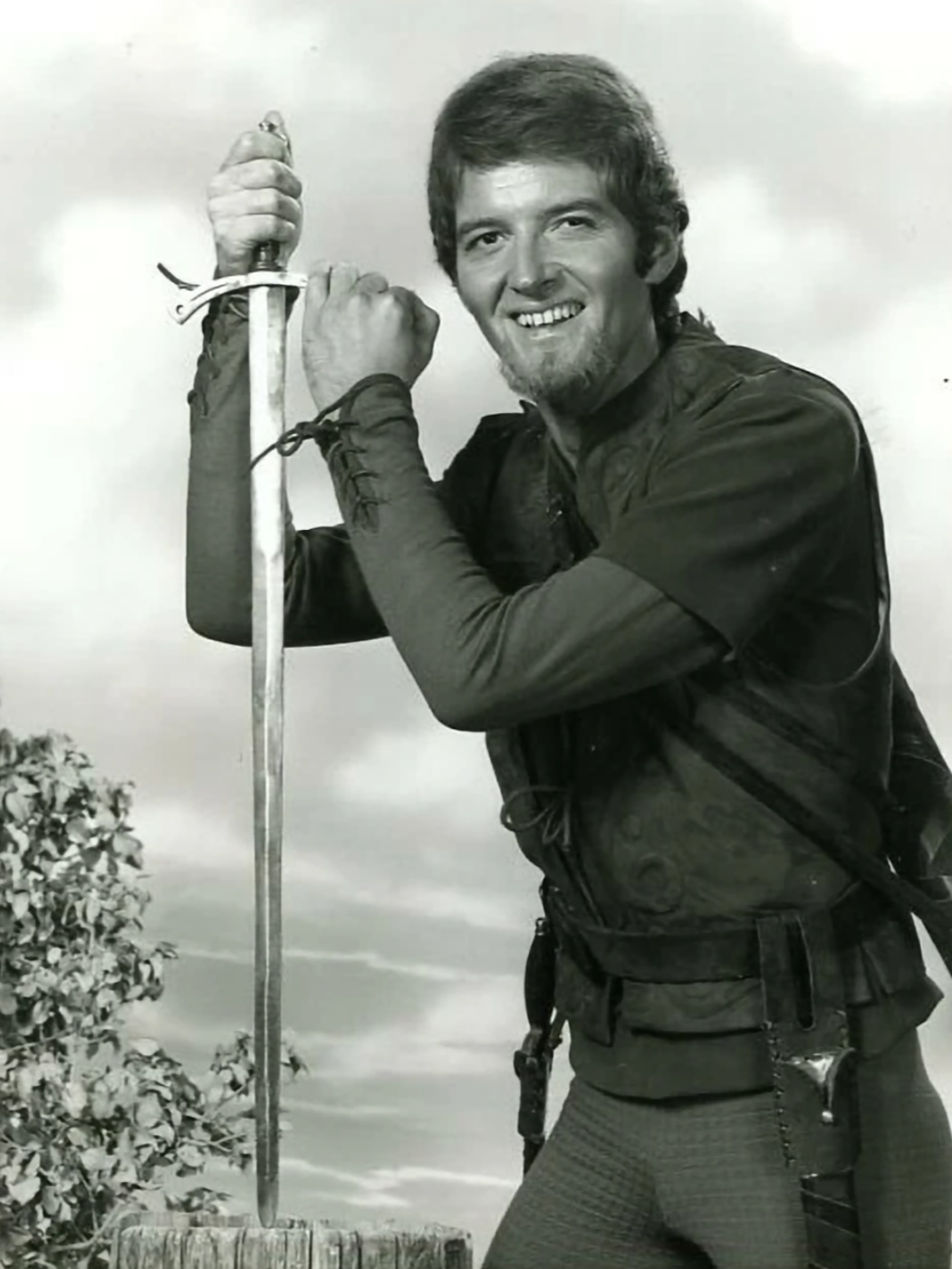
- Watson in The Legend of Robin Hood, 1968
- Born: David William Watson; 10 March 1940; Austin, Texas, U.S.
- Died: 5 October 2014 (aged 74); New York City, U.S.
- Occupation: Actor
- Years active: 1965–2003

David William Watson (10 March 1940 – 5 October 2014) was a British-American actor of film, television and theatre.

== Early life ==
David Watson was born in Austin, Texas, but his parents subsequently moved to London, England, where he was raised. He recalled childhood games where children would argue over who would play Robin Hood or the Sheriff of Nottingham, comparing the tradition to American children playing cowboys and Indians.

== Career ==
Watson began his artistic pursuits as a concert pianist, studying seriously before shifting to acting at the age of 13. He participated in amateur theatrical productions and later studied acting in West London, eventually performing the lead role of Tony in West Side Story at the age of 18.

He also had a musical career as a classically trained baritone, performing in five concerts with Leonard Bernstein and the New York Philharmonic, and later portraying the title role in Bernstein’s Candide at Lincoln Center in New York.

Watson began playing many Shakespearean characters including that of Hamlet, Prince of Denmark in Hamlet, Romeo in Romeo and Juliet, Prospero in The Tempest and Macbeth in Macbeth. He transitioned into American television in the 1960s, with early appearances in shows such as Rawhide, Never Too Young, The Girl from U.N.C.L.E., The Time Tunnel, Petticoat Junction (S 5, Ep 1), Rowan & Martin's Laugh In, Walt Disney's Wonderful World of Color, Daniel Boone, Charlie's Angels, The Bionic Woman, Project U.F.O. and Good Guys Bad Guys.

In 1968, he played the title role in the NBC-TV musical special The Legend of Robin Hood, a 90-minute production which he described as a major milestone in his career. “I really think The Legend of Robin Hood is possibly the beginning of my career,” he stated. Watson viewed the role as deeply personal, having admired Robin Hood since childhood.

His co-stars in the special included Steve Forrest as the Sheriff of Nottingham and Roddy McDowall as Prince John, along with Douglas Fairbanks Jr., Victor Buono, Walter Slezak, Bruce Yarnell, and Lee Beery.

In 1970, Watson appeared as Cornelius in the science fiction sequel Beneath the Planet of the Apes, replacing Roddy McDowall from the first film. The film also featured James Franciscus, Charlton Heston, Maurice Evans, Kim Hunter, and Linda Harrison. His portrayal of Cornelius further established his transition from musical theater and stage to major Hollywood films.

== Personal life and death ==
As of 1968, Watson was divorced and expressed a desire to find the right partner, settle down, and start a family. He often spoke about balancing his professional ambitions with his personal aspirations. “Life has been very full,” he reflected.

He retired in 2003, and died of a heart attack on 5 October 2014, at the age of 74.

== Filmography ==
=== Film ===
| Year | Title | Role | Notes |
|---|---|---|---|
| 1970 | Beneath the Planet of the Apes | Cornelius | Replaced Roddy McDowall |
| 1981 | Beyond the Next Mountain | Lt. Broughton | TV movie |
| 1988 | Perry Mason: The Case of the Lady in the Lake | Judge Howard McGraw | TV movie |
| 1994 | Lucky Break | Professor Type at Party | Also known as Paperback Romance |
| 1994 | Headless! | — | Short film |
| 2001 | My Brother Jack | Susso Man | TV movie |
| 2003 | The Wannabes | Granville Van Dyke | (final film role) |

=== Television ===
| Years | Title | Role | Notes |
|---|---|---|---|
| 1965 | Rawhide | Ian Cabot | 5 episodes |
| 1965–1966 | Never Too Young | Alfy | 35 episodes |
| 1966 | The Girl from U.N.C.L.E. | Greg Tower | 1 episode |
| 1966 | The Time Tunnel | Rudyard Kipling / Lt. Rynerson | 2 episodes |
| 1967 | Petticoat Junction | Peter | 1 episode |
| 1968 | The Legend of Robin Hood | Robin Hood | NBC-TV musical special |
| 1968 | Walt Disney's Wonderful World of Color | William Killigrew | 2 episodes |
| 1968–1970 | Daniel Boone | Prince Louis / David Scott | 3 episodes |
| 1977 | Charlie's Angels | Tom Lavin | 1 episode |
| 1977 | The Bionic Woman | Benny | 1 episode |
| 1978 | Project U.F.O. | Monsignor Killian | 1 episode |
| 1996 | Neighbours | Leith Davidson | 1 episode |
| 1997 | Good Guys Bad Guys | Surveillance Cop | 1 episode |
