= Puppets (1926 film) =

1926 film by George Archainbaud

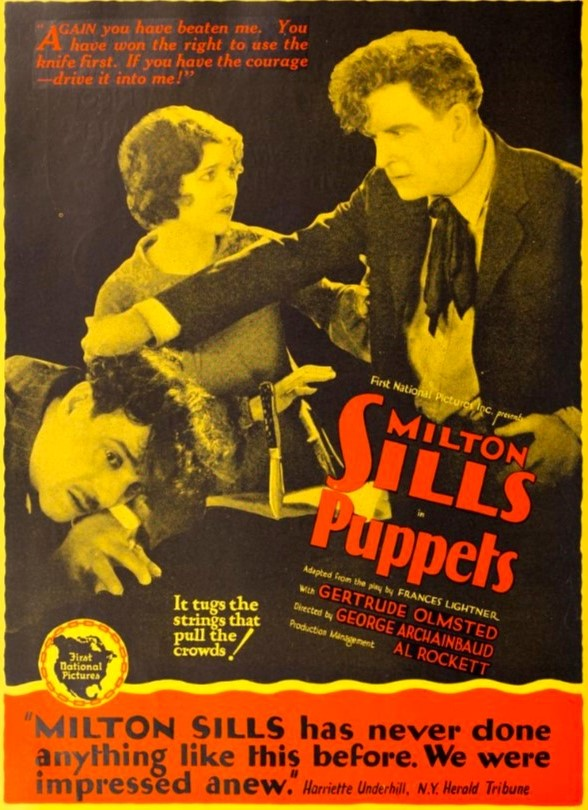
- Advertisement
- Directed by: George Archainbaud
- Written by: John F. Goodrich
- Based on: Puppets by Frances Lightner
- Produced by: Al Rockett
- Starring: Milton Sills; Gertrude Olmstead; Francis McDonald
- Cinematography: Charles Van Enger
- Edited by: Arthur Tavares
- Production company: Al Rockett Productions
- Distributed by: First National Pictures
- Release date: June 20, 1926
- Running time: 80 minutes
- Country: United States
- Language: Silent (English intertitles)

Puppets is a 1926 American silent drama film directed by George Archainbaud and starring Milton Sills, Gertrude Olmstead, and Francis McDonald. It was written by John F. Goodrich based upon the play of the same name by Frances Lightner.

The film's sets were designed by the art director Milton Menasco. It was shot at the old Biograph Studios in New York and on location at the Italian puppet theatre in the city.

== Cast ==
- Milton Sills as Nicki
- Gertrude Olmstead as Angela
- Francis McDonald as Bruno
- Mathilde Comont as Rosa
- Lucien Prival as Frank
- William Ricciardi as Sandro
- Nick Thompson as Joe

== Bibliography ==
- Koszarski, Richard. Hollywood on the Hudson: Film and Television in New York from Griffith to Sarnoff. Rutgers University Press, 2008.
