= The Trail of the Law =

1924 film by Oscar Apfel

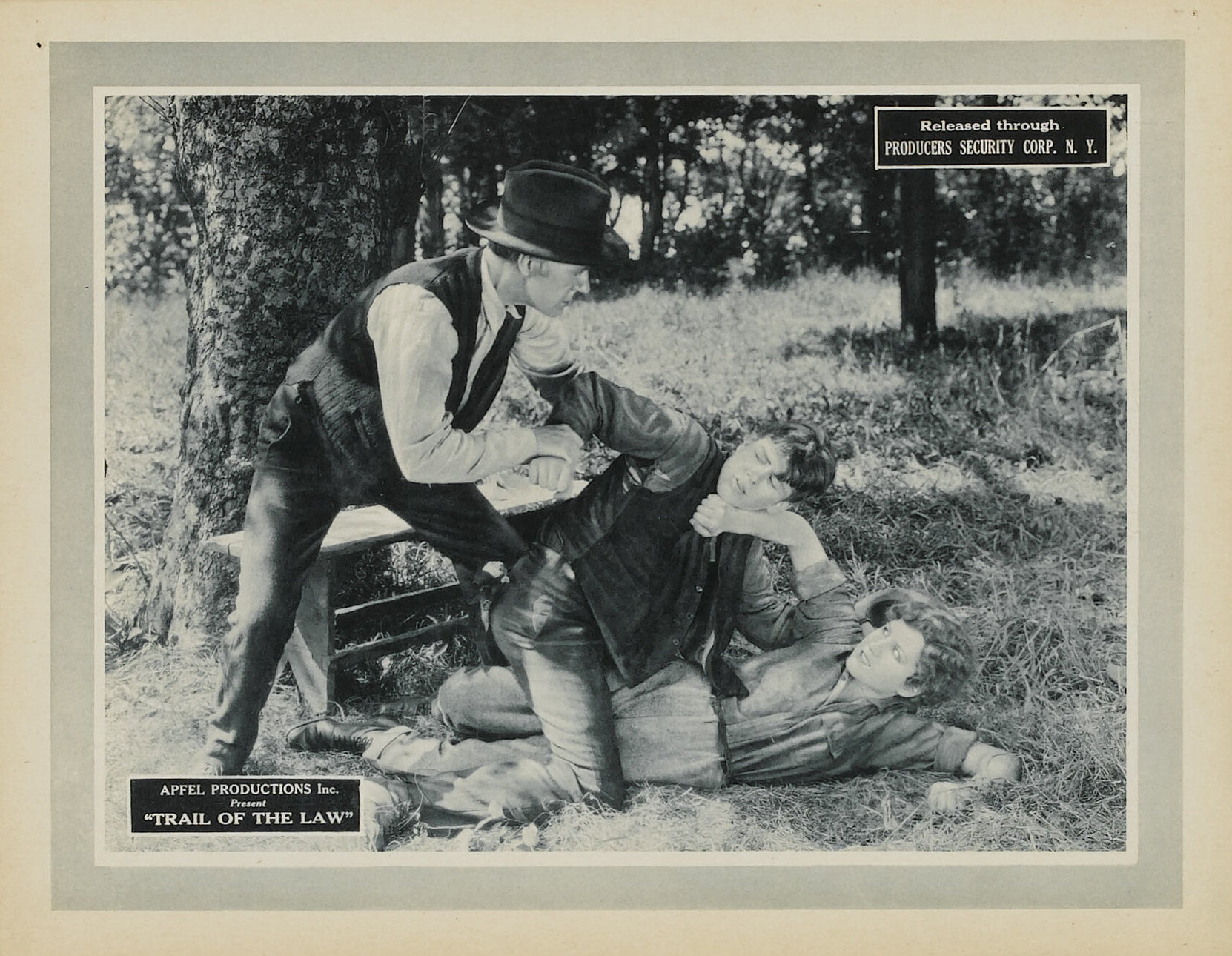
- Lobby card
- Directed by: Oscar Apfel
- Written by: Marion Brooks
- Produced by: Oscar Apfel
- Cinematography: Alfred Gandolfi
- Production company: Biltmore Productions
- Distributed by: Producers Security Corporation
- Release date: January 25, 1924
- Running time: 64 minutes
- Country: United States
- Languages: Silent; English intertitles

The Trail of the Law is a 1924 American silent film directed by Oscar Apfel and starring Wilfred Lytell, Norma Shearer and John P. Morse. A print exists at the BFI National Archive.

== Cast ==
- Wilfred Lytell
- Norma Shearer as Jerry Vardon
- John P. Morse
- George Stevens
- Richard Neill
- Charles Byer

== Bibliography ==
- Jack Jacobs & Myron Braum. The films of Norma Shearer. A. S. Barnes, 1976.
