= Sally Blane =

American actress (1910–1997)

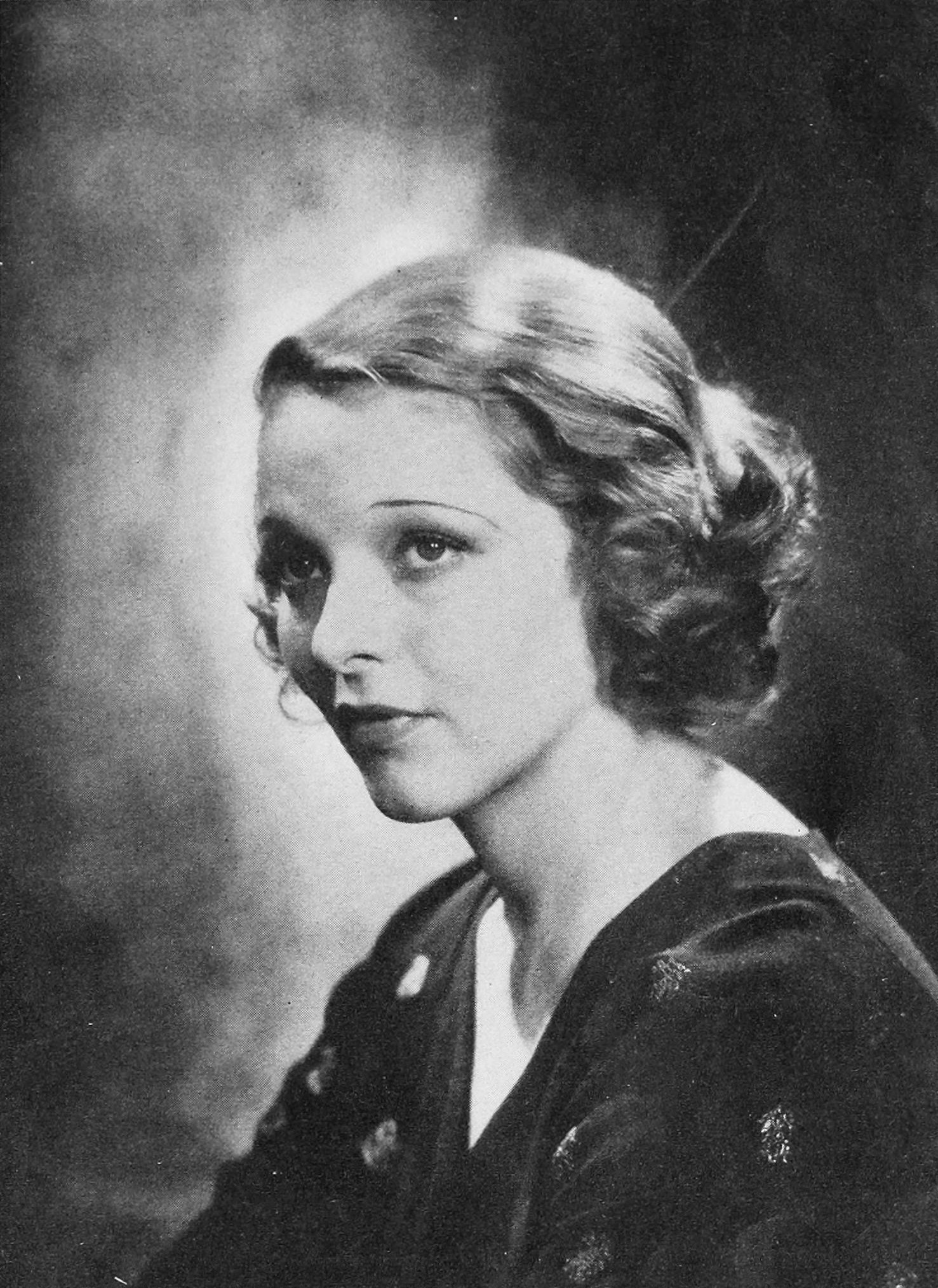
- Blane in 1932
- Born: Elizabeth Jane Young; July 11, 1910; Salida, Colorado, U.S.
- Died: August 27, 1997 (aged 87); Los Angeles, California, U.S.
- Occupation: Actress
- Years active: 1917–1957
- Spouse: Norman Foster (m. 1935; died 1976)
- Children: 2
- Relatives: Polly Ann Young (sister); Loretta Young (sister); Georgiana Young (half-sister); Judy Lewis (niece); Christopher Lewis (nephew); Peter Lewis (nephew)

Sally Blane (born Elizabeth Jane Young; July 11, 1910 – August 27, 1997) was an American actress who appeared in more than 100 movies.

== Early life ==
Blane was born in Salida, Colorado, moving to California with her family in 1916. She was the sister of actresses Polly Ann Young and Loretta Young, and the half-sister of Georgiana Young.

== Career ==
Blane had her film debut at the age of seven when she appeared in Sirens of the Sea in 1917. She returned to the film business as an adult in the 1920s, playing small parts in a number of silent films. Her career continued into the 1930s when Blane appeared in several low-budget films, including Once a Sinner (1930), A Dangerous Affair (1930), Arabian Knights (1931), Annabelle's Affairs (1931), Hello Everybody! (1933), City Limits (1934), Against the Law (1934), The Silver Streak (1934), and This is the Life (1935). Some of her scenes, including one in Annabelle's Affairs, in which she appeared in skimpy lingerie with Jeanette MacDonald and Joyce Compton, were risqué for their day, pre-dating the industry's Hays Code that largely forbade such shots after 1934. The footage from Annabelle's Affairs is considered lost.

Although her appearances began to fade toward the late 1930s, Blane acted in more than 100 films. She appeared onscreen at one time or another with all her sisters, for example with all three in The Story of Alexander Graham Bell (1939). After this, Blane appeared in only four more films in small supporting roles: Fighting Mad (1939), Charlie Chan at Treasure Island (1939), La Fuga, (1944) and A Bullet for Joey (1955).

== Personal life ==
Blane, at one time romantically linked to singer Russ Columbo, married actor and director Norman Foster in October 1935. In June 1936, they had their first child, Gretchen, named after Blane's sister Loretta Young, whose birth name was Gretchen. They later had a son named Robert. Blane was Catholic and was educated in convent school.

== Death ==
Blane died at her home near Beverly Hills, California, on August 27, 1997, of cancer (as did her sisters Polly, who died seven months prior, and Loretta, who died in 2000) at the age of 87.

Blane is buried next to her husband (Section W, tier 19, grave 21) in Culver City's Holy Cross Cemetery.

== Selected filmography ==
- Sirens of the Sea (1917) - Child
- The Sheik (1921) - Arab Child (uncredited)
- Casey at the Bat (1927) - Floradora Girl
- Rolled Stockings (1927) - (uncredited)
- Shootin' Irons (1927) - Lucy Blake
- Wife Savers (1928) - Colette
- Dead Man's Curve (1928) - Ethel Hume
- Her Summer Hero (1928) - Grave
- Horseman of the Plains (1928) - Dawn O'Day
- Fools for Luck (1928) - Louise Hunter
- The Vanishing Pioneer (1928) - June Shelby
- King Cowboy (1928) - Polly Randall
- Outlawed (1929) - Anne
- Wolves of the City (1929) - Helen Marsh
- Eyes of the Underworld (1929) - Florence Hueston
- The Very Idea (1929) - Nora
- Half Marriage (1929) - Sally
- Tanned Legs (1929) - Janet Reynolds
- The Show of Shows (1929) - Performer in 'Meet My Sister' Number
- The Vagabond Lover (1929) - Jean Whitehall
- The Little Accident (1930) - Madge
- Once a Sinner (1931) - Hope Patterson
- Ten Cents a Dance (1931) - Molly
- Women Men Marry (1931) - Rose Bradley
- Annabelle's Affairs (1931) - Dora
- The Star Witness (1931) - Sue Leeds
- Shanghaied Love (1931) - Mary Swope
- A Dangerous Affair (1931) - Marjory Randolph
- The Spirit of Notre Dame (1931) - Peggy
- X Marks the Spot (1931) - Sue Taylor
- Good Sport (1931) - Marge
- Law of the Sea (1931) - Betty Merton
- The Local Bad Man (1932) - Marion Meade
- Cross-Examination (1932) - Grace Varney
- The Reckoning (1932) - Judy
- Probation (1932) - Janet
- Disorderly Conduct (1932) - Helen Burke
- Escapade (1932) - Kay Whitney
- Forbidden Company (1932) - Barbara Blake
- The Phantom Express (1932) - Carolyn Nolan
- Heritage of the Desert (1932) - Judy
- The Pride of the Legion (1932) - Peggy Smith
- I Am a Fugitive from a Chain Gang (1932) - Alice
- Wild Horse Mesa (1932) - Sandy Melberne
- Hello, Everybody! (1933) - Lily Smith
- Trick for Trick (1933) - Constance Russell
- Night of Terror (1933) - Mary Rinehart
- Mayfair Girl (1933) - Brenda Mason
- Crime on the Hill (1933) - Sylvia Kennett
- Advice to the Lovelorn (1933) - Louise
- No More Women (1934) - Helen Young
- Stolen Sweets (1934) - Patricia Belmont
- City Limits (1934) - Helen Matthews
- City Park (1934) - Rose Wentworth
- Half a Sinner (1934) - Phyllis
- She Had to Choose (1934) - Clara Berry
- Against the Law (1934) - Martha Gray
- The Silver Streak (1934) - Ruth Dexter
- This Is the Life (1935) - Helen Davis
- The Great Hospital Mystery (1937) - Ann Smith
- Angel's Holiday (1937) - Pauline Kaye
- One Mile from Heaven (1937) - Barbara Harrison
- Crashing Through Danger (1938) - Ann Foster
- Numbered Woman (1938) - Linda Morgan
- The Story of Alexander Graham Bell (1939) - Gertrude Hubbard
- Way Down South (1939) - Claire Bouton
- Charlie Chan at Treasure Island (1939) - Stella Essex
- Fighting Mad (1939) - Ann Fenwick
- The Escape (1944) - Mrs. Garland
- A Bullet for Joey (1955) - Marie Temblay
