= Special Delivery (1927 film) =

1927 film

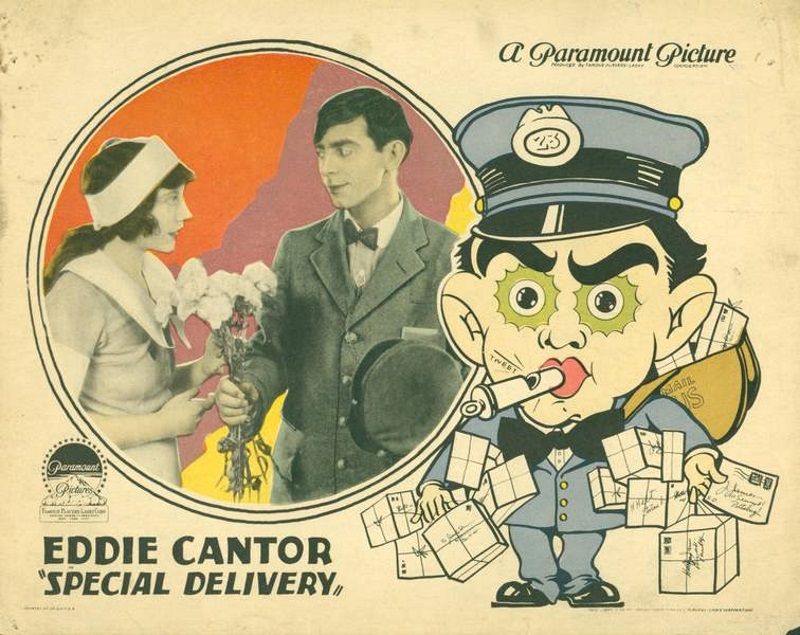
- Lobby card
- Directed by: William Goodrich (Roscoe Arbuckle)
- Written by: George Marion Jr. John F. Goodrich; Uncredited: Larry Semon
- Story by: Eddie Cantor
- Produced by: Jesse L. Lasky; B. P. Schulberg; Adolph Zukor; Uncredited: Larry Semon
- Starring: Eddie Cantor; Jobyna Ralston; William Powell
- Cinematography: Harry Hallenberger
- Production company: Paramount Pictures
- Distributed by: Paramount Pictures
- Release date: May 6, 1927
- Running time: 60 minutes
- Country: United States
- Language: Silent (English intertitles)

Special Delivery (1927)

Special Delivery is a 1927 American silent comedy film directed by Roscoe Arbuckle starring Eddie Cantor, Jobyna Ralston and William Powell. It was written by Cantor, John F. Goodrich, and George Marion Jr. (with Larry Semon, uncredited). It was released by Paramount Pictures. The film's copyright was renewed in 1954, so it entered the public domain in the United States on January 1, 2023.

== Plot ==
Eddie, a mailman, is in love with waitress Madge but finds amongst his rivals for her affections the dishonest promoter Harold Jones. Eddie, who cannot dance, impresses Madge at the postal ball by his energetic performance of the Black Bottom after a piece of ice falls down his shirt and wins a cup. He eventually unmasks Harold as a crooked swindler.

== Cast ==
- Eddie Cantor as Eddie, The Mail Carrier
- Jobyna Ralston as Madge, The Girl
- William Powell as Harold Jones
- Donald Keith as Harrigan, The Fireman
- Jack Dougherty as Flannigan, a cop
- Victor Potel as Nip, a detective
- Paul Kelly as Tuck, another detective
- Mary Carr as The Mother
- Marilyn Cantor Baker as Extra (uncredited) (as Marilyn Cantor)
- Marjorie Cantor as Extra (uncredited)
- Tiny Doll as Baby on Eddie's Route (uncredited)
- Robert Livingston as Extra at Postal Ball (uncredited)
- Natalie Cantor Metzger as Extra (uncredited) (as Natalie Cantor)
- Spec O'Donnell as Office Boy (uncredited)

== Preservation ==
A 35mm copy of the film is held by George Eastman House.
