= Beautiful But Dumb =

1928 silent romantic comedy film

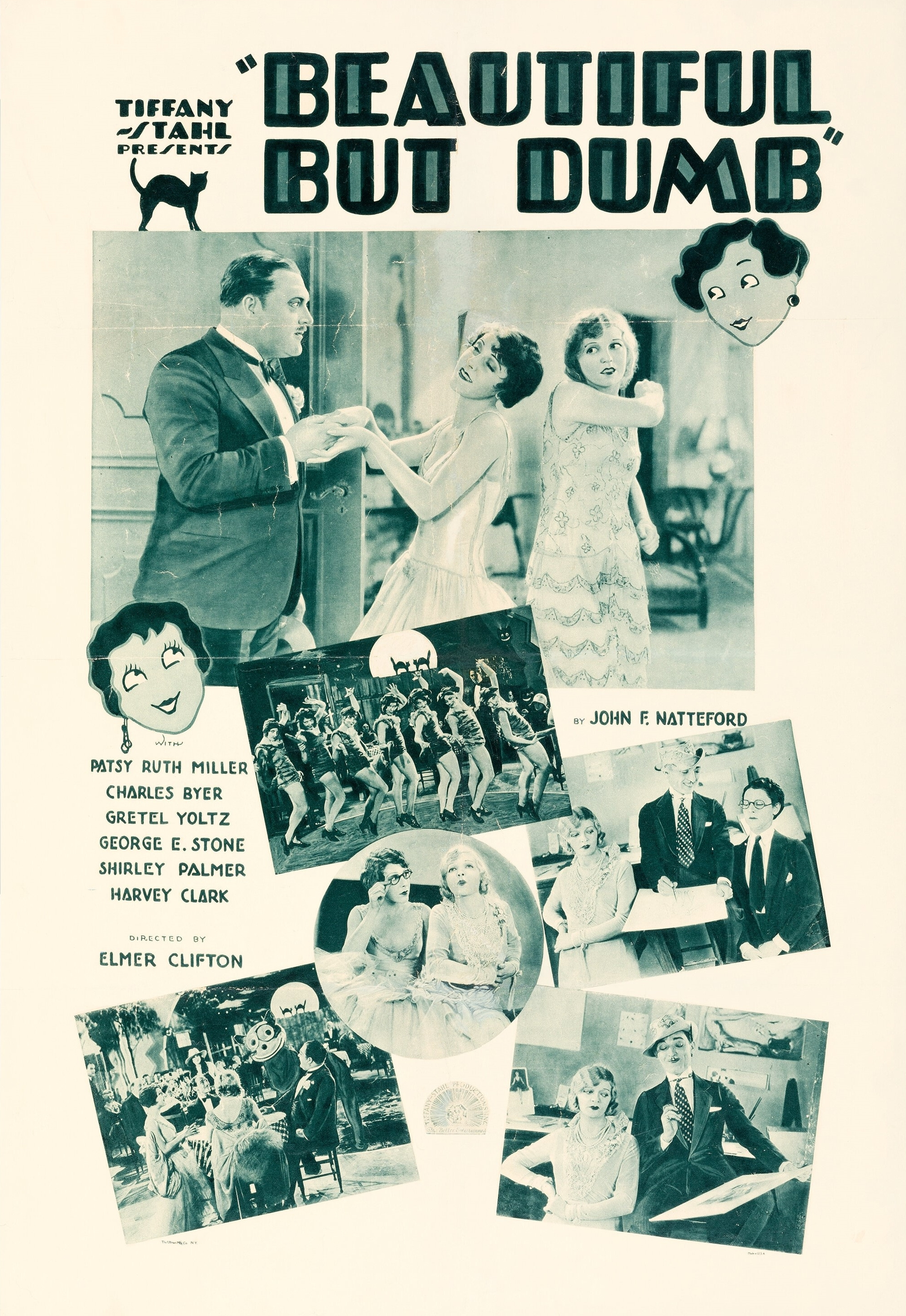
- 1928 poster
- Directed by: Elmer Clifton
- Written by: Fanny Hatton; Frederic Hatton; Jack Natteford
- Produced by: John M. Stahl
- Starring: Patsy Ruth Miller; Charles Byer; George E. Stone
- Cinematography: L. Guy Wilky
- Edited by: Desmond O'Brien
- Production company: Tiffany Pictures
- Distributed by: Tiffany Pictures
- Release date: July 1, 1928
- Running time: 70 minutes
- Country: United States
- Languages: Silent; English intertitles

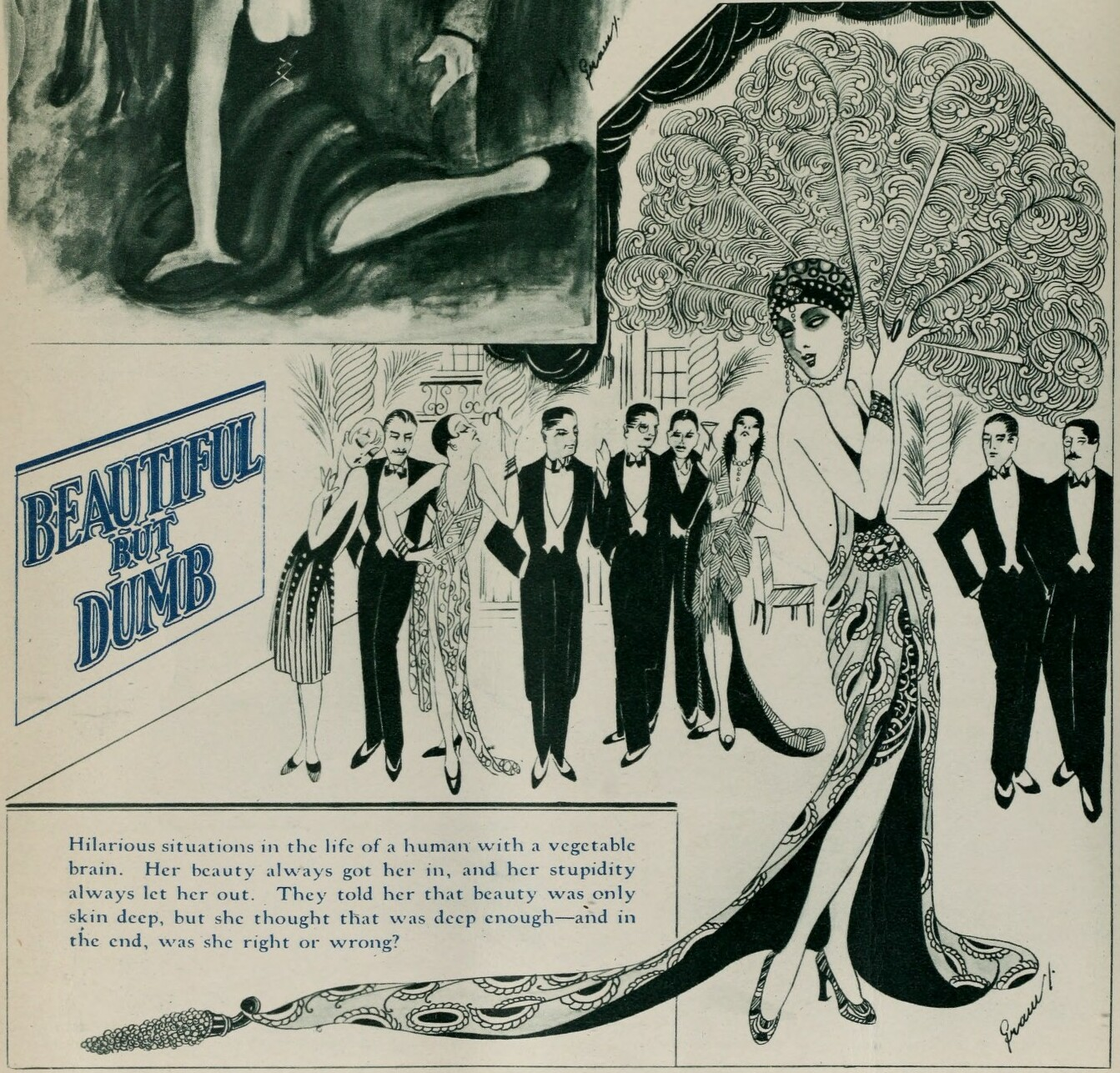
Beautiful But Dumb advertisement in The Film Daily, 1927

Beautiful But Dumb is a 1928 American silent romantic comedy film directed by Elmer Clifton and starring Patsy Ruth Miller, Charles Byer and George E. Stone.

The film is believed to be lost.

== Plot ==
A stenographer has a makeover and schemes to snare her boss.

== Cast ==
- Patsy Ruth Miller as Janet Brady
- Charles Byer as James Conroy
- George E. Stone as Tad
- Shirley Palmer as Beth
- Eileen Sedgwick as Mae
- William Irving as Ward
- Harvey Clark as Broadwell

== Bibliography ==
- Munden, Kenneth White. The American Film Institute Catalog of Motion Pictures Produced in the United States, Part 1. University of California Press, 1997.
