= Dead Man's Curve (1928 film) =

1928 film

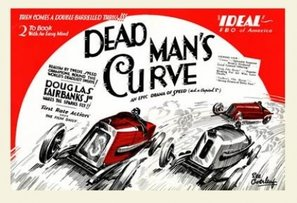
- Directed by: Richard Rosson
- Written by: Ewart Adamson; Randolph Bartlett; Frank Richardson Pierce
- Starring: Douglas Fairbanks Jr.; Sally Blane; Charles Byer
- Cinematography: Philip Tannura
- Edited by: Ewart Adamson
- Production company: FBO
- Distributed by: FBO
- Release date: January 15, 1928
- Running time: 60 minutes
- Country: United States
- Languages: Silent; English intertitles

Dead Man's Curve is a 1928 American silent action film directed by Richard Rosson and starring Douglas Fairbanks Jr., Sally Blane and Charles Byer.

It was given a British release in 1929.

== Cast ==
- Douglas Fairbanks Jr. as Vernon Keith
- Sally Blane as Ethel Hume
- Charles Byer as George Marshall
- Arthur Metcalfe as Fergus Hume
- Kit Guard as Goof Goober
- Byron Douglas as Benton
- Jim Mason as Derne

== Bibliography ==
- James Monaco. The Encyclopedia of Film. Perigee Books, 1991.
