= A Horseman of the Plains =

1928 film

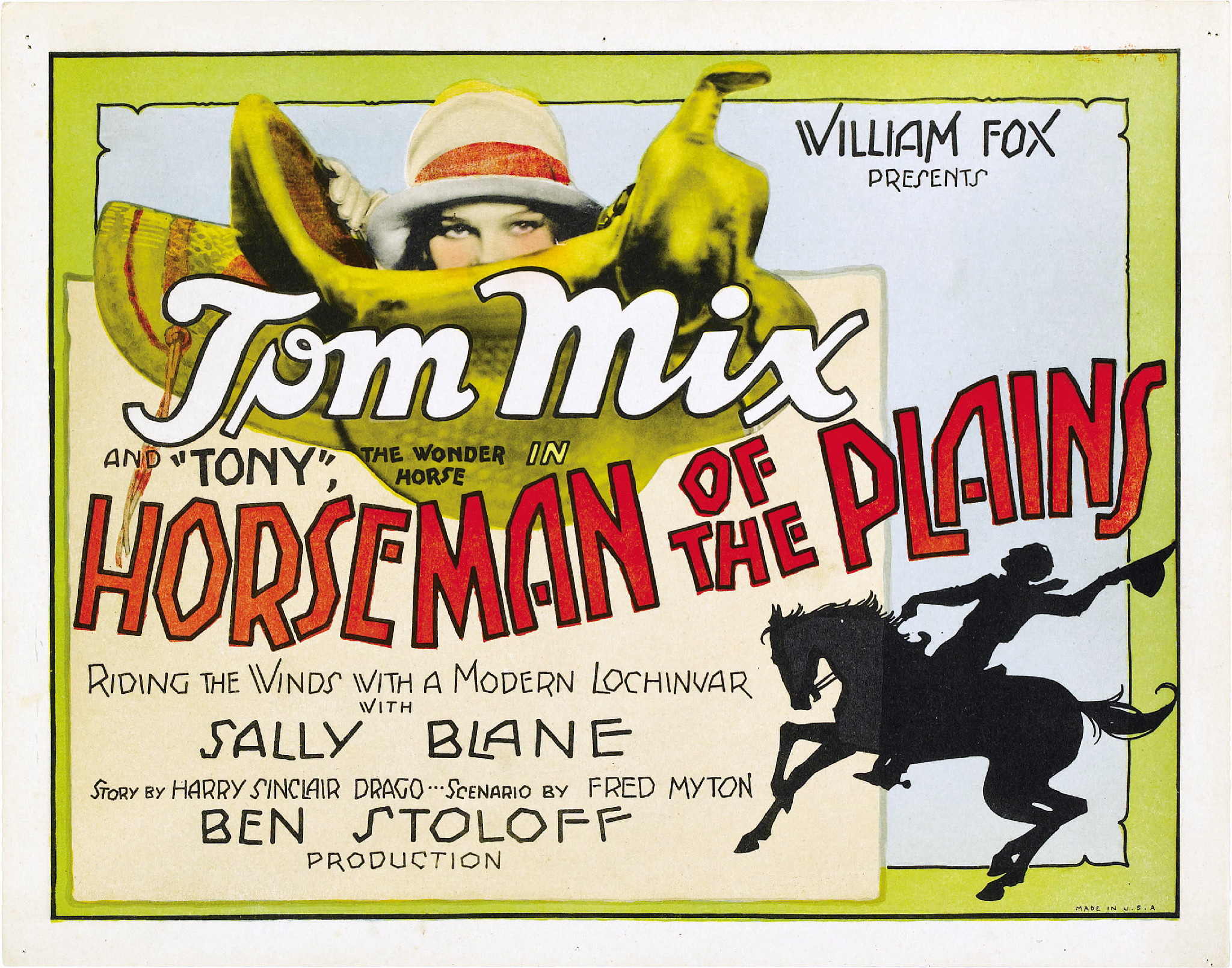
- Directed by: Benjamin Stoloff
- Written by: Harry Sinclair Drago; Fred Myton
- Produced by: Benjamin Stoloff
- Starring: Tom Mix; Sally Blane; Heinie Conklin
- Cinematography: Daniel B. Clark
- Production company: Fox Film
- Distributed by: Fox Film
- Release date: March 11, 1928
- Country: United States
- Languages: Silent; English intertitles

A Horseman of the Plains is a 1928 American silent Western film directed by Benjamin Stoloff and starring Tom Mix, Sally Blane and Heinie Conklin.

== Cast ==
- Tom Mix as Tom Swift
- Tony the Wonder Horse as Tom's Horse
- Sally Blane as Dawn O'Day
- Heinie Conklin as Snowshoe
- Charles Byer as J. Rutherford Gates
- Lew Harvey as Flash Evan
- Grace Marvin as Esmeralda
- William Ryno as Michael O'Day

== Bibliography ==
- Jensen, Richard D. The Amazing Tom Mix: The Most Famous Cowboy of the Movies. 2005.
