= Marion Brooks =

American screenwriter

- Born: January 21, 1896; Chicago, Illinois, USA
- Died: July 11, 1987 (aged 91); California, USA
- Occupation(s): Screenwriter, actress
- Spouse: Robert McKinney

Marion Brooks (1896–1987) was an American actress, entertainment journalist, and screenwriter active in Hollywood during the silent era. She was a cousin of film producer Adolph Zukor's wife.

== Biography ==
Marion was born in Illinois to Nathaniel Brooks and Catherine Adler. She began working as an actress in Hollywood in the early 1910s, and went on to forge a career as a screenwriter. She met and married actor Robert McKinney (who went by the name Russell Richie professionally) on a film set in 1923. From the late 1920s and into the 1940s, she was head of Paramount's fan-mail department. She also worked as an entertainment journalist; he writing appeared in film magazines like Screenland.

== Selected filmography ==
=== As screenwriter ===
- The Trail of the Law (1924)
- Do and Dare (1922)
- The Man Who Paid (1922)
- Ashes (1913)
- Old Mammy's Charge (1913)
- The Judge's Vindication (1913)
- A Jolly Good Fellow (1913)
- The Fires of Conscience (1912)
- The Winner and the Spoils (1912)
- The Passer-By (1912)
- The Heir Apparent (1912)
- Freezing Auntie (1912)
- Her Diary (1912)

=== As actress ===
- Martin Chuzzlewit (1912)
- Freezing Auntie (1912)
- Uncle Hiram's List (1911)
