= The Crooked Hearts =

- Genre: Comedy; Crime; Romance
- Based on: Lonelyheart 4122 by Colin Watson
- Written by: A.J. Russell
- Directed by: Jay Sandrich
- Starring: Douglas Fairbanks Jr. Rosalind Russell; Ross Martin; Michael Murphy; Maureen O'Sullivan
- Music by: Billy Goldenberg
- Country of origin: United States
- Original language: English

Production
- Executive producer: Lee Rich
- Producer: Allen S. Epstein
- Production location: 20th Century Fox Studios
- Cinematography: Joe Biroc
- Editor: Gene Fowler Jr.
- Running time: 74 minutes
- Production company: Lorimar Productions

Original release
- Network: ABC
- Release: November 8, 1972

The Crooked Hearts is a 1972 American made-for-television comedy film starring Rosalind Russell, Douglas Fairbanks Jr. and was directed by Jay Sandrich. The film marked Russell's final acting appearance and was originally broadcast as the ABC Movie of the Week on November 8, 1972.

== Plot ==
Lorita Dorsey is a widow trying to marry rich bachelor, Rex Willoughby, through a lonely hearts club, but her plans fails into a deadly cat-and-mouse game.

== Cast ==
- Rosalind Russell as Laurita Dorsey
- Douglas Fairbanks Jr. as Rex Willoughby
- Ross Martin as Sergeant Daniel Shane
- Michael Murphy as Officer Frank Adamic
- Maureen O'Sullivan as Lillian Stanton
- Kent Smith as James Simpson
- Dick Van Patten as Edward—Desk Clerk
- Patrick Campbell as Taxi Driver
- Liam Dunn as Writer
- Penny Marshall as Waitress
- Kenneth Tobey as Fisherman

== Production ==
The film was shot over 12 days.

== Reception ==
The New York Times said it was "pleasant but wears exceedingly thin". The review concludes: "Some viewers probably would settle for outright comedy minus the clanky hanky‐panky, with Miss Russell simply being her rakish, lah‐de‐dah self. This lady's not for murder, she's for winks. And so, at this point, is Mr. Fairbanks, with his vintage courtliness. Miss O'Sullivan, looking like a million, Ross Martin, Michael Murphy and Kent Smith all do well in supporting roles, under Jay Sandrich's smooth direction of an equally smooth script by A. J. Russell. But better a short breeze than a long‐winded teaser."

The Los Angeles Times called it "outstanding". Judith Crist in TV Guide said, "1972's 'The Crooked Hearts' is a better-than-usual tailored-for-television flick, only because the performers--Rosalind Russell, Douglas Fairbanks, Jr. and Maureen O'Sullivan--prove themselves old pros at charming their way through weak material as lonely-hearts racketeers."
