= Douglas Fairbanks Jr. =

American actor, film producer, and U.S. Navy officer (1909–2000)

Douglas Fairbanks Jr. KBE
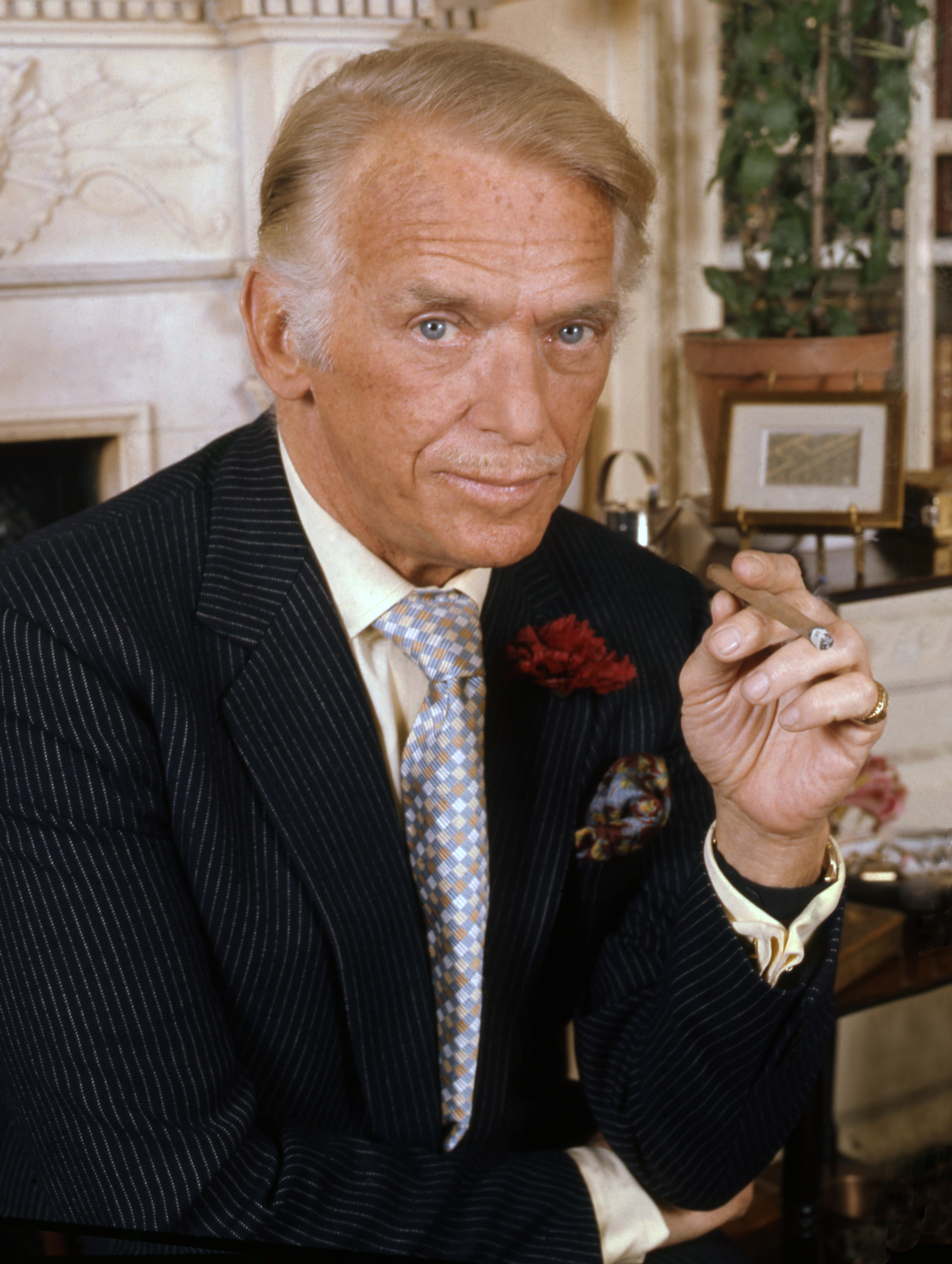
- Portrait by Allan Warren, 1973
- Born: Douglas Elton Fairbanks Jr. December 9, 1909; New York City, US
- Died: May 7, 2000 (aged 90); New York City, US
- Occupations: Actor; producer; naval officer
- Years active: 1916–1997
- Spouses: Joan Crawford (m. 1929; div. 1933); Mary Lee Epling (m. 1939; died 1988); Vera Shelton (m. 1991)
- Children: 3
- Father: Douglas Fairbanks
- Relatives: Jack Whiting (stepfather); Mary Pickford (stepmother)
- Military career
- Allegiance: United States
- Branch: United States Navy
- Service years: 1941–1954
- Rank: Captain
- Units: Beach Jumpers
- Conflicts: World War II; Convoy PQ 17; Operation Husky; Operation Dragoon
- Awards: Silver Star Medal; Legion of Merit (LOM); Italian War Cross; Legion of Honour (Officer) (Note: French: Légion d'honneur - Officier); Croix de Guerre; Knight Commander of the Order of the British Empire (Honorary); Distinguished Service Cross (United Kingdom) (DSC)

Douglas Elton Fairbanks Jr. KBE (December 9, 1909 – May 7, 2000) was an American actor, producer, and United States Navy officer. He was a leading man during the Golden Age of Hollywood, notably in adventure and swashbuckling roles like in The Prisoner of Zenda (1937), Gunga Din (1939), and The Corsican Brothers (1941). He was the son of Douglas Fairbanks and the stepson of Mary Pickford. Fairbanks, Jr. "picked up his father's swashbuckling style and later cut a dash in high society and royal circles." His first marriage was to actress Joan Crawford.

Fairbanks was a decorated Naval officer during the Second World War, overseeing the Beach Jumpers special warfare unit. For his war service, he received several military accolades including the Silver Star, the Legion of Merit, the French Legion of Honour and Croix de Guerre, and the British Distinguished Service Cross.

== Early life ==
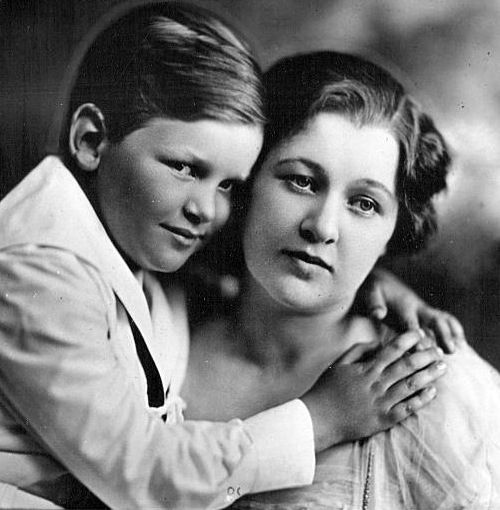
Young Fairbanks with his mother

Douglas Elton Fairbanks Jr. was born in New York City in 1909. He was the only child of actor Douglas Fairbanks and Anna Beth Sully, the daughter of wealthy industrialist Daniel J. Sully. Fairbanks' father was one of cinema's first icons, noted for such swashbuckling adventure films as The Mark of Zorro, Robin Hood, and The Thief of Bagdad. Fairbanks had small roles in his father's films American Aristocracy (1916) and The Three Musketeers (1921).

His parents divorced when he was nine years old, and both remarried. He lived with his mother in New York, California, Paris, and London.

Fairbanks began his education at the exclusive Hollywood School for Boys in Los Angeles. After his mother and stepfather moved to New York, he attended the Bovee School, a private grammar school for boys. While attending Bovee, he was also enrolled in an after-school drill academy called Knickerbocker Greys, which he attended for a year while assigned to the drum corps. After moving back to California, he attended Harvard Military School, followed by studies at the Polytechnic School in Pasadena. After his mother and he moved to France, Fairbanks attended Lycée Janson-de-Sailly.

== Film career ==
=== Stephen Steps Out and Paramount ===
Largely on the basis of his father's name, in May 1923, Fairbanks Jr. was given a contract with Paramount Pictures at age 13, at $1,000 a week for three years. He was signed by Jesse L. Lasky, who said the junior Fairbanks "is the typical American boy at his best" and said he likely would be featured in a film about Tom Sawyer.

"I do not think it is the right thing for the boy to do", said his father. "I want to see him continue his education. He is only 13 years old." The young actor arrived in Hollywood in June 1923 and was mobbed.

Tom Sawyer was not made. Instead, Fairbanks Jr. appeared in Stephen Steps Out (1923). The film was not a hit.

Paramount and he parted ways by mutual consent and Doug went to Paris to resume his studies. A year later, he returned to the studio, hired at what Fairbanks called "starvation wages", and having him work as a camera assistant.

"I was anxious to build my career as an actor slowly and painstakingly", he said in 1928. "I don't want to be a young, blond leading man with an aquiline nose and shiny white teeth."

Paramount gave him supporting roles in The Air Mail (1925) and Wild Horse Mesa (1925).

=== Stella Dallas and Young Woodley ===
Sam Goldwyn borrowed him to play the juvenile in Stella Dallas (1925), which wound up being his first box-office success. He had supporting roles in Paramount's The American Venus (1926), and Padlocked (1926). At Warner Bros., Fairbanks was in Broken Hearts of Hollywood (1926), then, at Metropolitan Pictures, he was in Man Bait (1927).

At MGM, he was in Edmund Goulding's Women Love Diamonds (1927) and for Alfred E. Green at Fox he was in Is Zat So? (1927). He supported Will Rogers in A Texas Steer (1927). Also in 1927, Fairbanks made his stage debut in Young Woodley based on a book by John Van Druten. Fairbanks Jr received excellent reviews and the production was a success – the play did much to improve his reputation in Hollywood. A regular audience member was Joan Crawford, with whom Fairbanks became romantically involved. He also appeared in a stage production of Saturday's Children.

=== Early leading-man roles ===
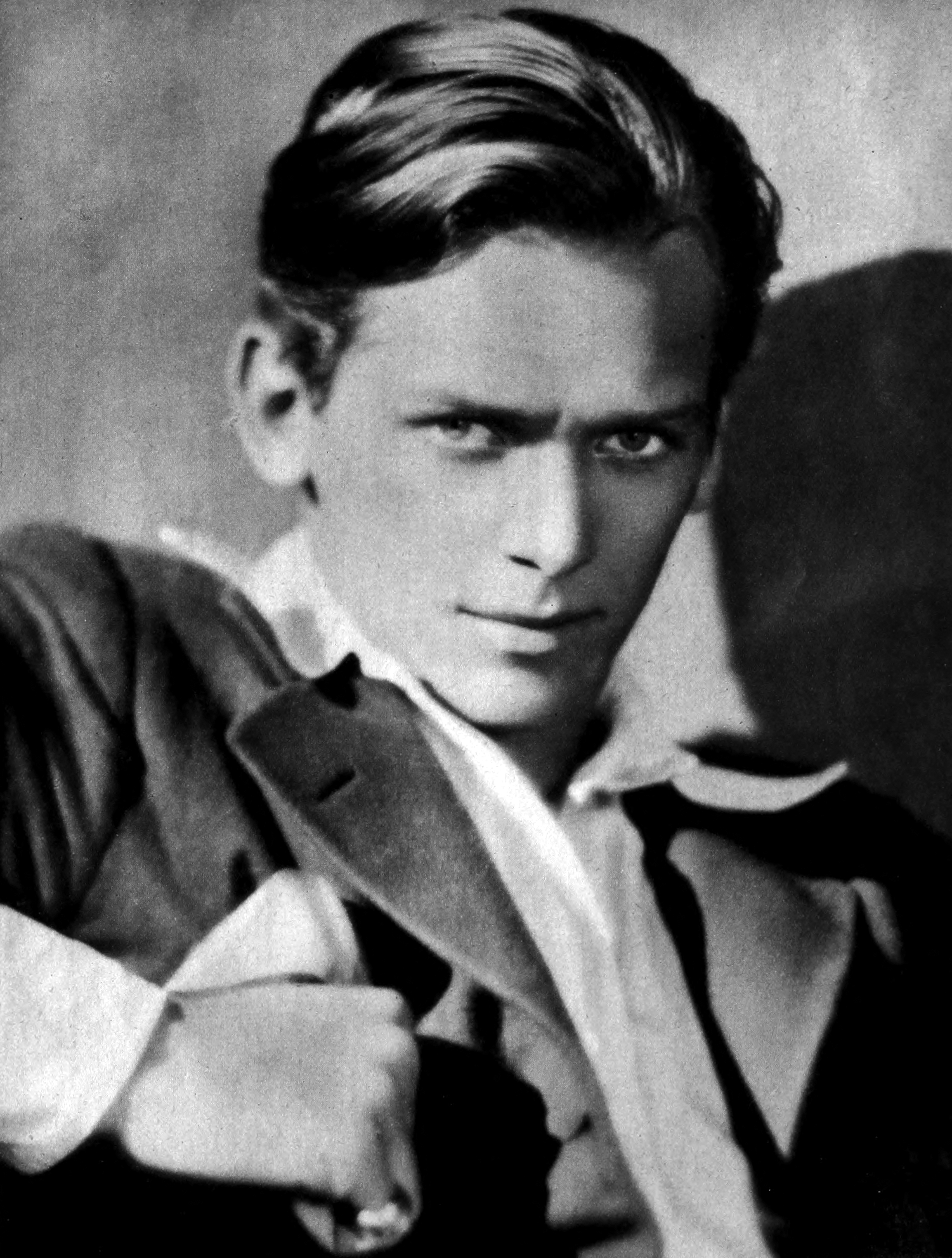
Douglas Fairbanks Jr. in 1928, photographed in conjunction with his role in "The Power of the Press"

Fairbanks' second lead role was in Dead Man's Curve (1928) for FBO. He was Helene Chadwick's leading man in Modern Mothers (1928) at Columbia, and he starred in The Toilers (1928) for Tiffany. Fairbanks starred in another for Columbia, The Power of the Press (1928), directed by Frank Capra. He went back to supporting roles for The Barker (1928) at First National, his first "talkie" and A Woman of Affairs (1928) at MGM with Greta Garbo and John Gilbert.

Fairbanks had another starring role at FBO with The Jazz Age (1929) and received top billing over Loretta Young in Fast Life (1929) at Warner Bros. He appeared in MGM's Our Modern Maidens (1929) opposite Crawford.

=== First National and Warner Bros. ===
First National gave Fairbanks a starring role in The Careless Age (1929), and he was reunited with Young in The Forward Pass (1929). He was one of many names in The Show of Shows (1929). In September 1929, he returned to the stage in a production of The Youngest. Victor Halperin cast Fairbanks in the lead of Party Girl (1930), and Ted Wilde paired him for a third time with Young in Loose Ankles (1930), back at First National.

In 1930, Fairbanks Jr. went to Warner Bros. to test for the second lead in Moby Dick. Although he did not win the part, head of production Darryl F. Zanuck was impressed with Douglas's screen test, and cast him in an important role in The Dawn Patrol directed by Howard Hawks. Universal borrowed him to have the lead role in Little Accident (1930) and at Warner Bros., he was in the lead in The Sin Flood (1930). He supported Leslie Howard in the prestigious Outward Bound (1930) and was Billie Dove's leading man in One Night at Susie's (1930).

=== Little Caesar ===
Fairbanks had a role supporting Edward G. Robinson in Little Caesar (1931), filmed in August 1930. "We knew it was going to be good when we were making it, but not that it would become a classic", he later said. The movie was a big hit, and Warner Bros. offered Fairbanks Jr. a contract with cast and script approval – a condition which, Fairbanks Jr. says, was only offered to one other actor at the studio, Richard Barthelmess.

"By sheer accident, I had four successes in a row in the early '30s, and although I was still in my 20s, I demanded and received approval of cast, story, and director. I don't know how I got away with it, but I did!" Because he spoke French, he was put in L'aviateur (1931). Back in Hollywood, he was in Chances (1931) and I Like Your Nerve (1931) with Young.

In June 1931, he starred in another play, The Man in Possession, which he also produced along with Sid Grauman. Fairbanks said he wanted to stay away from costume adventures, which were associated with his father. He starred in two pictures for Alfred E Green, Gentleman for a Day (1932), a melodrama with Joan Blondell, and the comedy It's Tough to Be Famous (1932). He starred in a film shot in French, L'athlète incomplet (1932).

He starred in Love Is a Racket (1932) for William Wellman and Scarlet Dawn (1932) for William Dieterle. Fairbanks did another with Green, Parachute Jumper (1933), which gave an early co-starring role to Bette Davis. Fairbanks starred again with Young in The Life of Jimmy Dolan (1933) and did The Narrow Corner (1933) with Green. RKO borrowed Fairbanks to support Katharine Hepburn in Morning Glory (1933), a big success.

Fairbanks was reunited with Howard in Captured! (1933). In 1934, Warner asked all its stars to take a 50% pay cut because of the Depression. Fairbanks Jr. refused and was fired from the studio. He received a job offer from Britain and spent the next few years there, taking a residence in London's Park Lane.

=== Britain and Criterion films ===
Fairbanks went to Britain to star in Alex Korda's The Rise of Catherine the Great (1934) playing Grand Duke Peter opposite Elisabeth Bergner. "Hollywood was getting to be a grind", he said at the time. "They had me doing five and six pictures a year. Some of them looked all right on paper, but they had the habit of slipping down into programmer class. Only once in three years would I get a part that I cared about. I kept going up and down the ladder and not getting any place. There was nothing stable about my career in Hollywood."

He intended to return to Hollywood to appear in Design for Living, but became ill and was replaced by Gary Cooper. He did ultimately return to Hollywood for Success at Any Price (1934) at RKO, then returned to London for Mimi (1935). The latter starred Gertrude Lawrence, who became romantically involved with Fairbanks Jr. He announced he would make Zorro Rides Again with his father.

Fairbanks fell ill during the 1936 flu epidemic.

Fairbanks set up his own film production company, Criterion Films, where the board members included Paul Czinner. Among Criterion's films were Man of the Moment (1935), The Amateur Gentleman (1936), Accused (1936), and Jump for Glory (1937). He announced Lancelot, but did not make it.

=== Return to Hollywood and focus on action roles ===
Fairbanks Jr. returned to Hollywood when David O. Selznick offered him the role of Rupert of Hentzau in The Prisoner of Zenda (1937). He had been reluctant to accept the role, but his father urged him to do it, saying it was "actor proof". The movie was a big success.

In December 1937, he signed a nonexclusive contract with RKO to make two films a year for five years, at $75,000 a film. RKO used him as Irene Dunne's leading man in Joy of Living (1938). At Universal, he was Danielle Darrieux's co-star in The Rage of Paris (1938) and Ginger Rogers's in RKO's Having Wonderful Time (1938). Selznick used him again in The Young in Heart (1938) with Janet Gaynor.

Fairbanks then had his biggest-ever hit with RKO's Gunga Din (1939), alongside Cary Grant and Victor McLaglen. He began to work increasingly in action/adventure films: The Sun Never Sets (1939) at Universal; Rulers of the Sea (1939) at Paramount; Green Hell (1940) for James Whale at Universal, a flop; and Safari (1940) at Paramount.

He had a change of pace when he starred in and co-produced Angels Over Broadway (1940), written and directed by Ben Hecht at Columbia. His last film before enlisting was The Corsican Brothers (1941), a swashbuckler made as a tribute to Fairbanks' father. Fairbanks did not have faith in the film while it was being filmed ("I thought we were cutting corners"), but it was a huge success.

== World War II ==
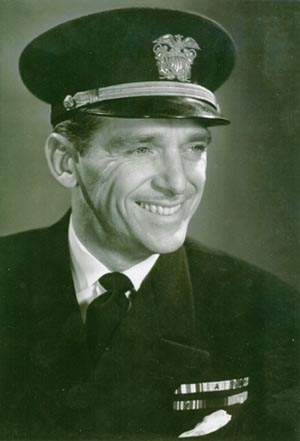
Douglas Fairbanks Jr., "Father of the U.S. Navy Beach Jumpers"

Fairbanks was commissioned as a reserve officer in the United States Navy when the United States entered World War II, and was assigned to Lord Mountbatten's commando staff in the United Kingdom.

In 1941, President Franklin D. Roosevelt appointed him special envoy to South America. Fairbanks served on the cruiser USS Wichita during the disastrous Convoy PQ 17 operation.

Lieutenant Fairbanks was subsequently transferred to Virginia Beach, where he came under the command of Admiral H. Kent Hewitt, who was preparing U.S. naval forces for the invasion of North Africa. Fairbanks convinced Hewitt of the advantages of a military deception unit, then repeated the proposal at Hewitt's behest to Admiral Ernest King, Chief of Naval Operations. King thereupon issued a secret letter on March 5, 1943, charging the Vice Chief of Naval Operations with the recruitment of 180 officers and 300 enlisted men for the Beach Jumpers program.

The Beach Jumpers' mission would simulate amphibious landings with a very limited force. Operating miles from the actual landing beaches and using their deception equipment, the Beach Jumpers would lure the enemy into believing that theirs was the principal landing.

United States Navy Beach Jumpers saw their initial action in Operation Husky, the invasion of Sicily. For the remainder of the war, the Beach Jumpers conducted their hazardous, shallow-water operations throughout the Mediterranean.

For his planning the diversion-deception operations and his part in the amphibious assault on Southern France, Lieutenant Commander Fairbanks was awarded the United States Navy's Legion of Merit with bronze V (for valor), the Italian War Cross for Military Valor, the French Légion d'honneur and the Croix de Guerre with Palm, and the British Distinguished Service Cross.

Fairbanks was also awarded the Silver Star for valor displayed while serving on PT boats, and in 1942, made an Officer of the National Order of the Southern Cross, conferred by the Brazilian government.

Among his other exploits was the sinking of the corvette UJ-6083 (formerly the Regia Marina Gabbiano-class Capriolo) while in command of a mixed division of American PT boats and British Insect-class gunboats plus assorted other small craft. Fairbanks commanded from HMS Aphis. Fairbanks stayed in the US Naval Reserve after the war, and ultimately separated from the Naval Reserve as a captain in 1954 after having served a total of 13 years. In 1982, Fairbanks was awarded the German Federal Cross of Merit for his contribution to the relief of the needy in occupied Germany.

== Postwar years ==
=== Hollywood ===
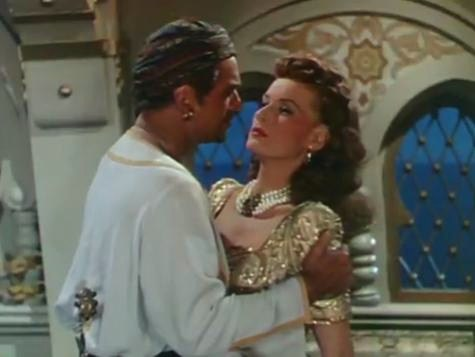
Fairbanks with Maureen O'Hara in Sinbad the Sailor (1947)

Fairbanks returned to Hollywood at the conclusion of World War II. He spent two years finding a comeback vehicle, and picked Sinbad the Sailor (1947), which was not a big hit.

He followed it with The Exile (1947), another swashbuckler, which Fairbanks wrote and produced; it was directed by Max Ophüls. The film was the first of three independent films Fairbanks was to produce – the others being a big screen version of Terry and the Pirates, and a film called Happy Go Lucky. It was another box office disappointment.

He thought his career would be revived by That Lady in Ermine with Betty Grable, but director Ernst Lubitsch died during production and was replaced by Otto Preminger; the resulting film was not a success, and Fairbanks Jr believes this cost his career momentum. Fairbanks tried another swashbuckler for his own company, The Fighting O'Flynn (1949).

=== British career ===
As a confirmed Anglophile, Fairbanks spent much time in the United Kingdom post World War II, where he was well known in the highest social circles. He was made an Honorary Knight Commander of the Order of the British Empire (KBE) in 1949. In 1950 he purchased a house, no. 28, The Boltons in Chelsea, London which became his primary residence until he sold it in 1973 to move to Florida.

The College of Arms in London granted Fairbanks a coat of arms symbolizing the U.S. and Britain united across the blue Atlantic Ocean by a silken knot of friendship.

Fairbanks starred in the British thriller State Secret (1950), written and directed by Sidney Gilliat, and a comedy for Val Guest, Mr Drake's Duck (1951)

Between 1954 and 1956, he also made a number of half-hour programs at one of the smaller Elstree film studios as part of a syndicated anthology series for television called Douglas Fairbanks Presents.

During the 1950s, Fairbanks appeared as himself on episodes of a number of American television shows, such as Your Show of Shows, The Ford Show, The Steve Allen Plymouth Show, and What's My Line?.

He co-produced the films The Silken Affair (1957) and Chase a Crooked Shadow (1958).

In 1961, he was a guest at the wedding of Katharine Worsley to Prince Edward, Duke of Kent.

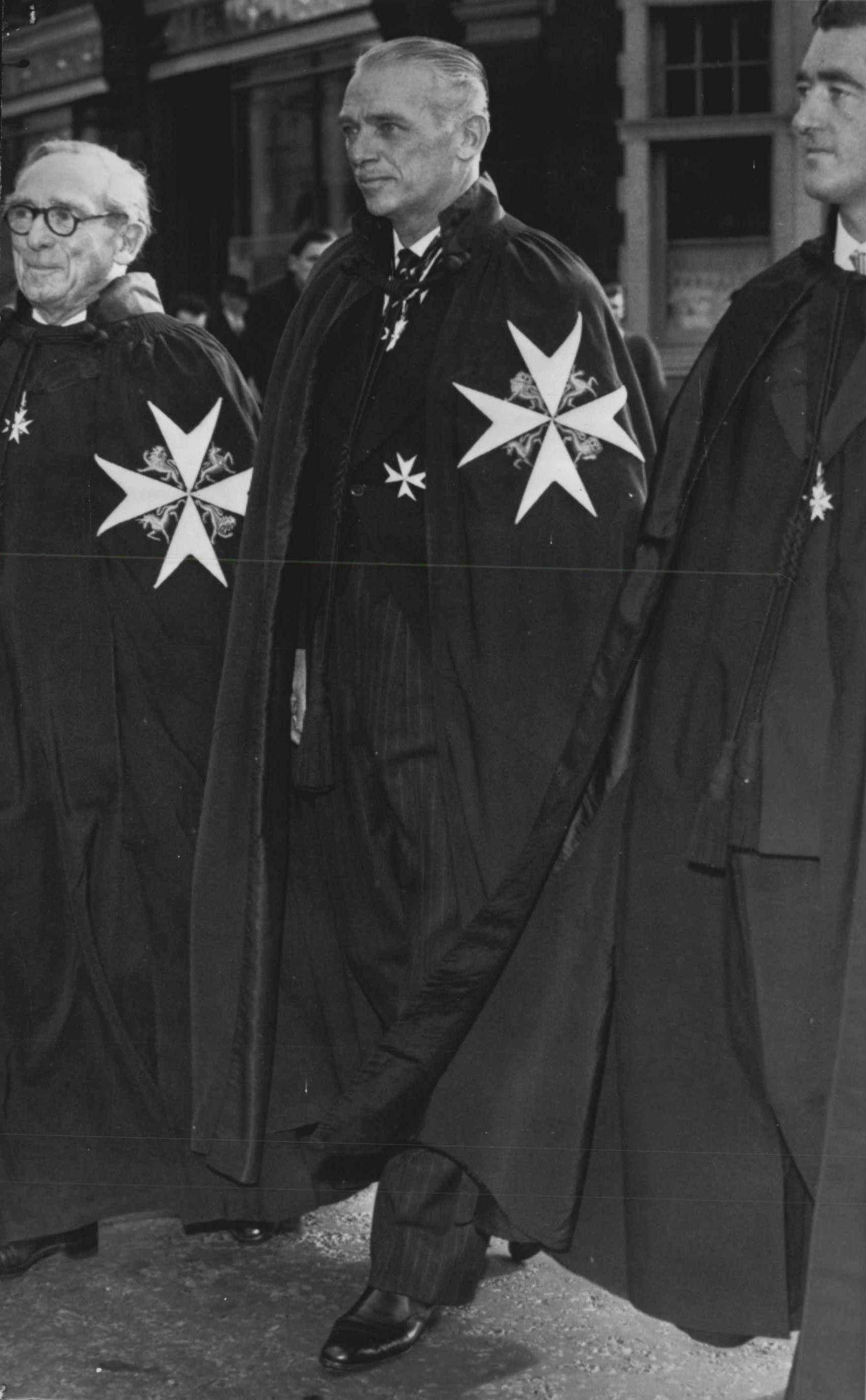
Fairbanks in 1958 wearing the mantle and insignia of a Knight of Justice of the Order of St. John.

He guest-starred on shows such as Route 66, The DuPont Show of the Week, The United States Steel Hour, The Red Skelton Hour, Dr. Kildare, and ABC Stage 67. He played King Richard in a TV musical The Legend of Robin Hood (1968).

== Later career ==
On stage, Fairbanks toured in My Fair Lady in 1968, and in The Pleasure of His Company several times, including tours in the U.S. in 1970–72 and the 1977 Australian production with Stanley Holloway, David Langton, Carole Ray- and Christine Amore. He appeared in some TV movies and TV series, including The Crooked Hearts (1972), The Hostage Tower (1980), and The Love Boat.

His last feature film was Ghost Story (1981). In 1984, he introduced two one-act plays by Gilbert and Sullivan for PBS Channel 13 in the United States.

His last TV roles were in the mini series Strong Medicine (1987) and the TV series B.L. Stryker. He was the subject of This Is Your Life in 1989, when he was surprised by Michael Aspel in the foyer of Thames Television's Teddington Studios.

Fairbanks was also involved in several successful business ventures. These included manufacturing ball point pens, real estate development, management of copyrighted theatrical works, and film production.

== Personal life ==
His first notable relationship was with the actress Joan Crawford, whom he began to date seriously during the filming of Our Modern Maidens. Fairbanks and Crawford married on June 3, 1929, at the "Actors Chapel", St. Malachy Roman Catholic Church in midtown Manhattan, although neither was Catholic. Fairbanks was only 19; Crawford was 3 or 4 years older. Their witnesses were his mother, Beth Sully, and actor Jack Whiting, who were married themselves a few weeks later.

Fairbanks and Crawford travelled to Britain on a delayed honeymoon, where he was entertained by Noël Coward, Gertrude Lawrence, Beatrice Lillie, and Prince George, Duke of Kent. He became active in both society and politics, but Crawford was far more interested in her career and had an affair with Clark Gable. In his first autobiography, he later admitted that he was also unfaithful during that period and that he unsuccessfully pursued Katharine Hepburn during the filming of Morning Glory. The couple divorced in 1933, but the divorce did not become final for another year.

Despite their divorce, Fairbanks was quick to defend Crawford when her adopted daughter Christina Crawford published Mommie Dearest, a scathing biography of Crawford's personal life. He firmly stated, "The Joan Crawford that I've heard about in Mommie Dearest is not the Joan Crawford I knew back then." In his autobiography, he stated that he never saw a hint of any significant anger outbursts from Crawford during their marriage, and that she was more likely to sulk or argue than become angry.

On April 22, 1939, Fairbanks married Mary Lee Hartford (née Mary Lee Epling), a former wife of Huntington Hartford, the A&P supermarket heir. He remained devoted to her until her death in 1988. They had three daughters: Daphne, Victoria, and Melissa, and eight grandchildren and 10 great-grandchildren. On May 30, 1991, Fairbanks married Vera Lee Shelton, a merchandiser for QVC Network Inc.

Douglas Fairbanks Jr. was claimed to be the naked man in the incriminating photos used as evidence in the divorce trial of Margaret Campbell, Duchess of Argyll in 1963. However, in 2013, Lady Colin Campbell, Margaret Campbell's stepdaughter-in-law, revealed that the man in the photo was actually Bill Lyons, sales director of Pan American Airlines.

In 1963, Fairbanks was also named in connection with the Profumo Scandal, allegedly having sexual affairs with both Mandy Rice-Davies and Christine Keeler a few years earlier.

Fairbanks was a friend of Laurence Olivier and was among the contributors to a documentary by The South Bank Show titled Laurence Olivier: A Life. He was also a close friend of Sir Rex Harrison and was a presenter at Harrison's New York City memorial service.

He wrote his autobiography The Salad Days in 1988. In addition, Fairbanks wrote a chronicle of his experiences during the Second World War, A Hell of a War, published in 1993. Beyond his two volumes of autobiography, Fairbanks collaborated with Richard Schickel on the illustrated survey of Fairbanks Sr. and Jr. called The Fairbanks Album (1975) and Jeffrey Vance with a critical study/biography of Fairbanks Sr. ultimately published as Douglas Fairbanks (2008).

== Death and legacy ==
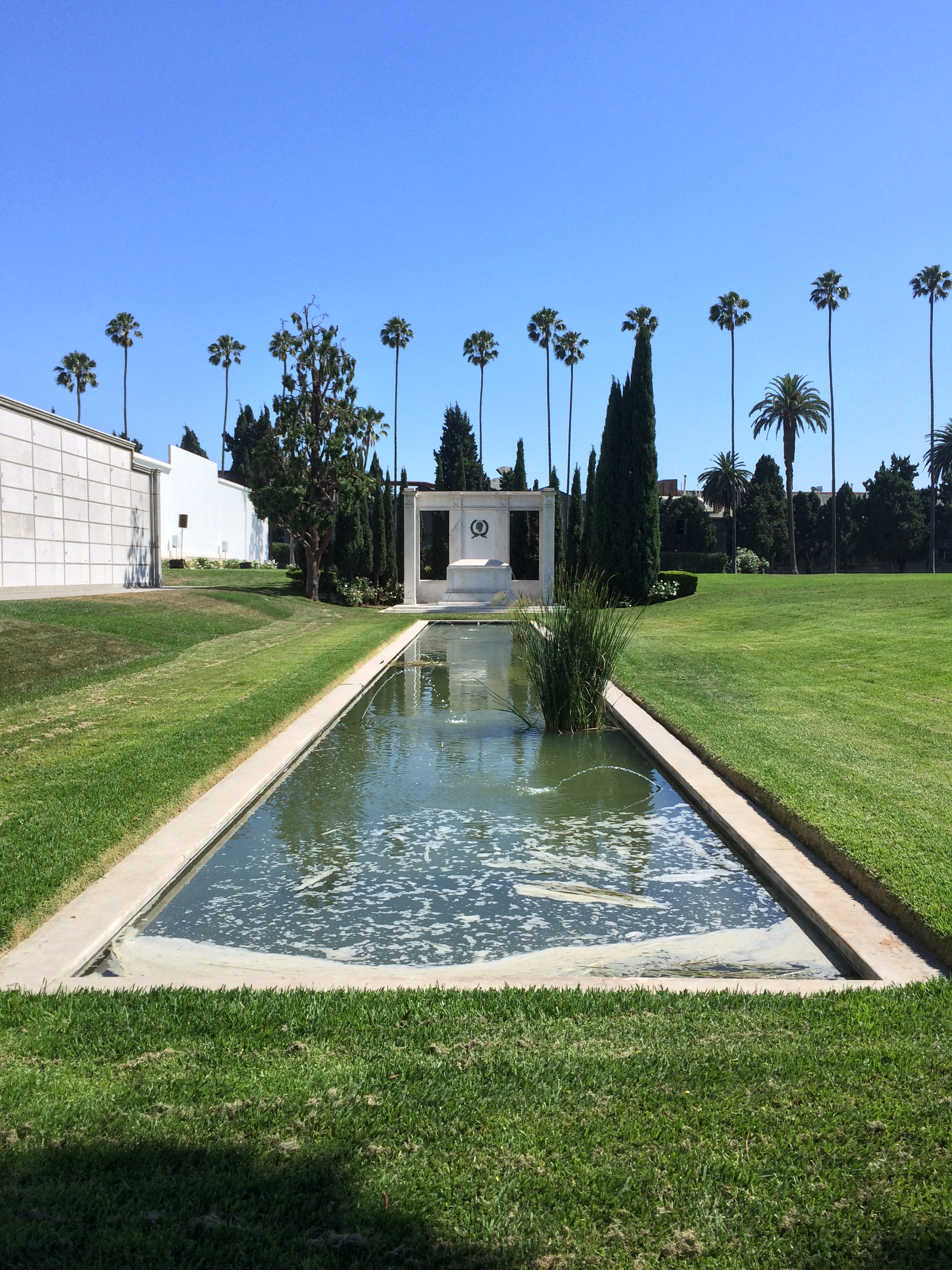
Fairbanks' tomb at Hollywood Forever

On the morning of May 7, 2000, Fairbanks died at the age of 90 of a heart attack and is interred at the Hollywood Forever Cemetery in Hollywood, California, in the same tomb as his father.

Fairbanks has three stars on the Hollywood Walk of Fame - one for motion pictures at 6318 Hollywood Boulevard, one for television at 6665 Hollywood Boulevard, and one for radio at 6710 Hollywood Boulevard. In 1969, he was inducted into the Hall of Fame of the International Best Dressed List.

The moving image collection of Douglas Fairbanks Jr., held at the Academy Film Archive, includes over 90 reels of home movies.

== Estate ==
Fairbanks's personal belongings were auctioned September 13, 2011, by Doyle New York, surpassing estimated proceeds by netting over $500,000.

== Filmography ==
Year	Film	Role	Director	Notes
1916	American Aristocracy	Newsboy (uncredited)	Lloyd Ingraham	
1921	The Three Musketeers	Boy (uncredited)	Fred Niblo	
1923	Stephen Steps Out	Stephen Harlow Jr.	Joseph Henabery	
1925	The Air Mail	Sandy	Irvin Willat	Incomplete film
1925	Wild Horse Mesa	Chess Weymer	George B. Seitz	
1925	Stella Dallas	Richard Grosvenor	Henry King	
1926	The American Venus	Triton	Frank Tuttle	Lost film
1926	Padlocked	Sonny Galloway	Allan Dwan	
1926	Broken Hearts of Hollywood	Hal Terwilliger	Lloyd Bacon	
1926	Man Bait	Jeff Sanford	Donald Crisp	Lost film
1927	Women Love Diamonds	Jerry Croker-Kelley	Edmund Goulding	
1927	Is Zat So?	G. Clifton Blackburn		Lost film
1927	A Texas Steer	Farleigh Bright	Richard Wallace	Lost film
1928	Dead Man's Curve	Vernon Keith	Richard Rosson	
1928	Modern Mothers	David Starke	Phil Rosen	Lost film
1928	The Toilers	Steve	Reginald Barker	
1928	The Power of the Press	Clem Rogers	Frank Capra	
1928	The Barker	Chris Miller	George Fitzmaurice	
1928	A Woman of Affairs	Jeffry Merrick	Clarence Brown	
1929	The Jazz Age	Steve Maxwell	Lynn Shores	
1929	Fast Life	Douglas Stratton	John Francis Dillon	Lost film
1929	Our Modern Maidens	Gil	Jack Conway	
1929	The Careless Age	Wyn	John Griffith Wray	
1929	The Forward Pass	Marty Reid	Edward F. Cline	Lost film
1929	The Show of Shows	Ambrose in 'Bicycle Built for Two' Number	John G. Adolfi	
1930	Party Girl	Jay Rountree	Victor Halperin	
1930	Loose Ankles	Gil Hayden	Ted Wilde	
1930	The Dawn Patrol	Douglas Scott	Howard Hawks	
1930	The Little Accident	Norman Overbeck	William James Craft	
1930	The Way of All Men	Billy Bear	Frank Lloyd	
1930	Outward Bound	Henry	Robert Milton	
1930	One Night at Susie's	Dick Rollins	John Francis Dillon	
1931	Little Caesar	Joe Massara	Mervyn LeRoy	
1931	L'aviateur			
1931	Chances	Jack Ingleside	Allan Dwan	
1931	I Like Your Nerve	Larry O'Brien	William C. McGann	
1932	Union Depot	Chick Miller	Alfred E. Green	
1932	It's Tough to Be Famous	Scott 'Scotty' McClenahan	Alfred E. Green	
1932	L'athlète incomplete	Fred Miller		
1932	Love Is a Racket	Jimmy Russell	William A. Wellman	
1932	Scarlet Dawn	Nikita Krasnoff	William Dieterle	
1933	Parachute Jumper	Bill Keller	Alfred E. Green	
1933	The Life of Jimmy Dolan	Jimmy Dolan aka Jack Dougherty	Archie Mayo	
1933	The Narrow Corner	Fred Blake	Alfred E. Green	
1933	Morning Glory	Joseph Sheridan	Lowell Sherman	
1933	Captured!	Lt. Jack 'Dig' Digby	Roy Del Ruth	
1934	The Rise of Catherine the Great	Grand Duke Peter	Paul Czinner	
1934	Success at Any Price	Joe Martin	J. Walter Ruben	
1935	Mimi	Rodolphe	Paul L. Stein	
1935	Man of the Moment	Tony	Monty Banks	
1936	The Amateur Gentleman	John Beverley aka Barnabas Barty	Thornton Freeland	
1936	Accused	Tony Seymour	Thornton Freeland	
1937	Jump for Glory	Ricky Morgan	Raoul Walsh	
1937	The Prisoner of Zenda	Rupert of Hentzau	W. S. Van Dyke (uncredited)	
1938	Joy of Living	Dan Brewster	Tay Garnett	
1938	The Rage of Paris	Jim Trevor	Henry Koster	
1938	Having Wonderful Time	Chick Kirkland	Alfred Santell	
1938	The Young in Heart	Richard Carleton	Richard Wallace	
1939	Gunga Din	Ballantine	George Stevens	
1939	The Sun Never Sets	John Randolph	Rowland V. Lee	
1939	Rulers of the Sea	David Gillespie	Frank Lloyd	
1940	Green Hell	Keith Brandon	James Whale	
1940	Safari	Jim Logan	Edward H. Griffith	
1940	Angels Over Broadway	Bill O'Brien	Lee Garmes (co-director)	
1941	The Corsican Brothers	Mario Franchi / Lucien Franchi	Gregory Ratoff	
1947	Sinbad the Sailor	Sinbad	Richard Wallace	
1947	The Exile	Charles Stuart (Charles II)	Max Ophüls (as Max Opuls)	
1948	That Lady in Ermine	Colonel Ladislas Karolyi Teglas / The Duke	Otto Preminger (but completed the film)	
1949	The Fighting O'Flynn	The O'Flynn	Arthur Pierson	
1950	State Secret	Dr. John Marlowe	Sidney Gilliat	
1951	Mr Drake's Duck	Donald 'Don' Drake	Val Guest	
1953	The Genie	The Genie (segment "The Genie")		
1953	Three's Company	Narrator / Anthony (segment "The Scream' story)		
1953	The Triangle	François Villon (segment "A Lodging for the Night")		
1954	Thought to Kill	Narrator		
1954	The Red Dress	Narrator		
1954	The Last Moment	George Griffin		
1954	Destination Milan			
1956	Faccia da mascalzone			
1958	Chase a Crooked Shadow		Michael Anderson	
1967	Red and Blue	Millionaire	Tony Richardson	
1972	The Crooked Hearts	Rex Willoughby	Jay Sandrich	
1978	Kingdom of Gifts	The Proud King (voice)		
1980	The Hostage Tower	Malcolm Philpott	Claudio Guzmán	
1981	Ghost Story	Edward Wanderley	John Irvin	
1987	Strong Medicine	Eli Camperdown		

== Radio appearances ==
Year	Program	Episode/source
1946	Screen Guild Players	The Old Lady Shows Her Medals

== Awards and honors ==
Coat of arms of Douglas Fairbanks Jr.
Notes College of Arms MS Grants 112, p. 37 Motto Fides Conatus Et Fidelitas

- Silver Star
- Legion of Merit
- American Defense Service Medal with "A" device
- American Campaign Medal
- European-African-Middle Eastern Campaign Medal
- World War II Victory Medal
- Naval Reserve Medal
- Knight Commander of the Order of the British Empire, 1949 (KBE, United Kingdom)
- Knight of Justice of the Order of St John (KStJ, United Kingdom)
- Knight of the Legion of Honor (France)
- Officer of the Order of the Southern Cross (Brazil)
- Distinguished Service Cross (United Kingdom)
- Croix de Guerre, 1939–1945 with bronze palm (France)
- War Cross for Military Valor (Italy)
- Federal Cross of Merit, Commander's Cross (West Germany)
