= The Fair Cheat =

1923 film directed by Burton L. King

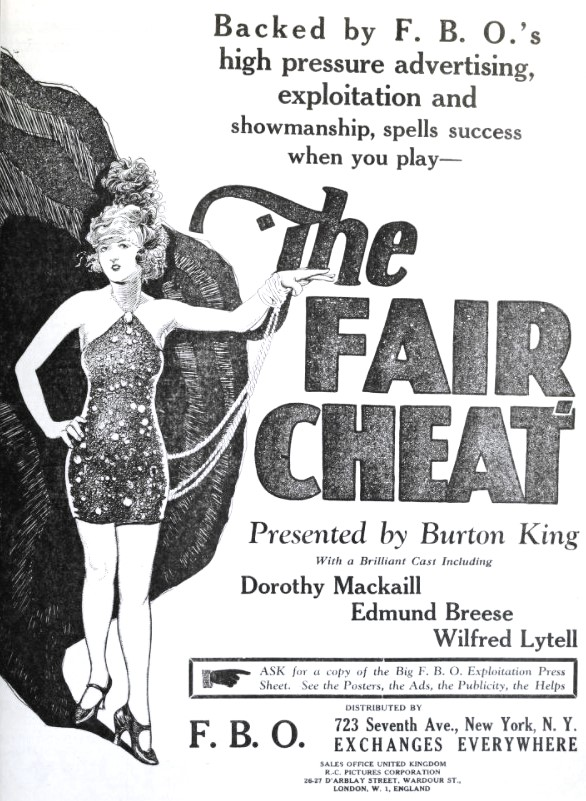
- Advertisement
- Directed by: Burton L. King
- Written by: William B. Laub
- Starring: Edmund Breese; Wilfred Lytell; Dorothy Mackaill
- Cinematography: Alfred Ortlieb
- Production company: Robertson-Cole Pictures Corporation
- Distributed by: Film Booking Offices of America
- Release date: September 16, 1923
- Running time: 6 reels
- Country: United States
- Language: Silent (English intertitles)

The Fair Cheat is a 1923 American silent comedy film directed by Burton L. King and starring Edmund Breese, Wilfred Lytell, and Dorothy Mackaill.

== Cast ==
- Edmund Breese as Morgan Van Dam
- Wilfred Lytell as John Hamilton
- Dorothy Mackaill as Camilla
- Marie White as Gloria Starke
- William Robyns as Rutledge Stone
- Bradley Barker as Sloman Zeigler
- Jack Newton as Sam Hiller
- Tom Blake as 'Bunk' Willis

== Preservation ==
With no prints of The Fair Cheat located in any film archives, it is a lost film.

== Bibliography ==
- Munden, Kenneth White. The American Film Institute Catalog of Motion Pictures Produced in the United States, Part 1. University of California Press, 1997.
