= Flaming Gold =

1933 film by Ralph Ince

- Directed by: Ralph Ince
- Screenplay by: Malcolm Stuart Boylan; John F. Goodrich
- Story by: Houston Branch
- Produced by: Merian C. Cooper
- Starring: William Boyd; Pat O'Brien; Mae Clarke; Rollo Lloyd; Helen Ware
- Cinematography: Charles Rosher
- Edited by: George Crone
- Music by: Oscar Levant; Max Steiner; Roy Webb
- Production company: RKO Pictures
- Distributed by: RKO Pictures
- Release date: September 29, 1933
- Running time: 53 minutes
- Country: United States
- Language: English

Flaming Gold is a 1933 American pre-Code drama film directed by Ralph Ince and written by Malcolm Stuart Boylan and John F. Goodrich. The film stars William Boyd, Pat O'Brien, Mae Clarke, Rollo Lloyd and Helen Ware. The film was released on September 29, 1933, by RKO Pictures.

== Plot ==
Dan Manton and Ben Lear are partners in an oil drilling operation in Mexico. The object of sabotage from competitors, the tables are turned when the competitor's rigs catch fire. After the fires are under control, local saloon owner Tampico Tess Terrill recruits Martin and Lear to help her develop a similar oil operation.

== Cast ==
- William Boyd as Dan Manton
- Pat O'Brien as Ben Lear
- Mae Clarke as Claire Gordon
- Rollo Lloyd as Harry Banning
- Helen Ware as Tampico Tess Terrell
- Robert McWade as Bill Conway
