= The Harvest Moon =

1920 film

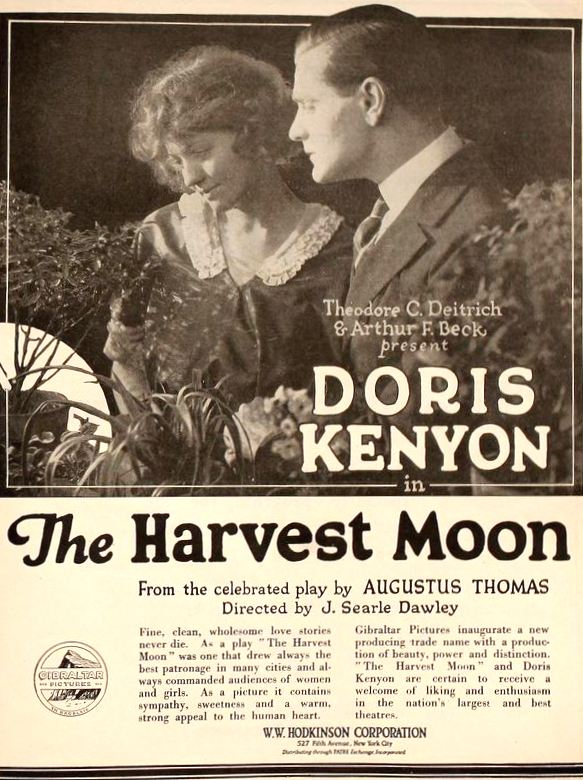
- Advertisement
- Directed by: J. Searle Dawley
- Written by: J. Searle Dawley
- Produced by: Arthur F. Beck; Theodore C. Deitrich
- Starring: Doris Kenyon; Wilfred Lytell; George Lessey
- Cinematography: Bert Dawley
- Production companies: Dietrich-Beck; Gibraltar Pictures
- Distributed by: Pathé Exchange; W. W. Hodkinson Corporation
- Release date: April 25, 1920
- Running time: 6 reels
- Country: United States
- Language: Silent (English intertitles)

The Harvest Moon is a 1920 American silent drama film directed by J. Searle Dawley and starring Doris Kenyon, Wilfred Lytell, and George Lessey. It was shot at the Fort Lee studios in New Jersey.

== Cast ==
- Doris Kenyon as Dora Fullerton
- Wilfred Lytell as Willard Holcomb
- George Lessey as Jacques Vavin
- Earl Schenck as Professor Fullerton
- Peter Lang as Judge Elliott
- Marie Shotwell as Mrs. Winthrop
- Stuart Robson as Graham Winthrop
- Grace Barton as Cornelia Fullerton
- Daniel Pennell as Henri
- Edna Holland as Madame Mercier
- Ellen Olson as Marie

== Bibliography ==
- Koszarski, Richard . Fort Lee: The Film Town (1904-2004). Indiana University Press, 2005.
