= The Flirting Widow =

1930 film directed by William A. Seiter

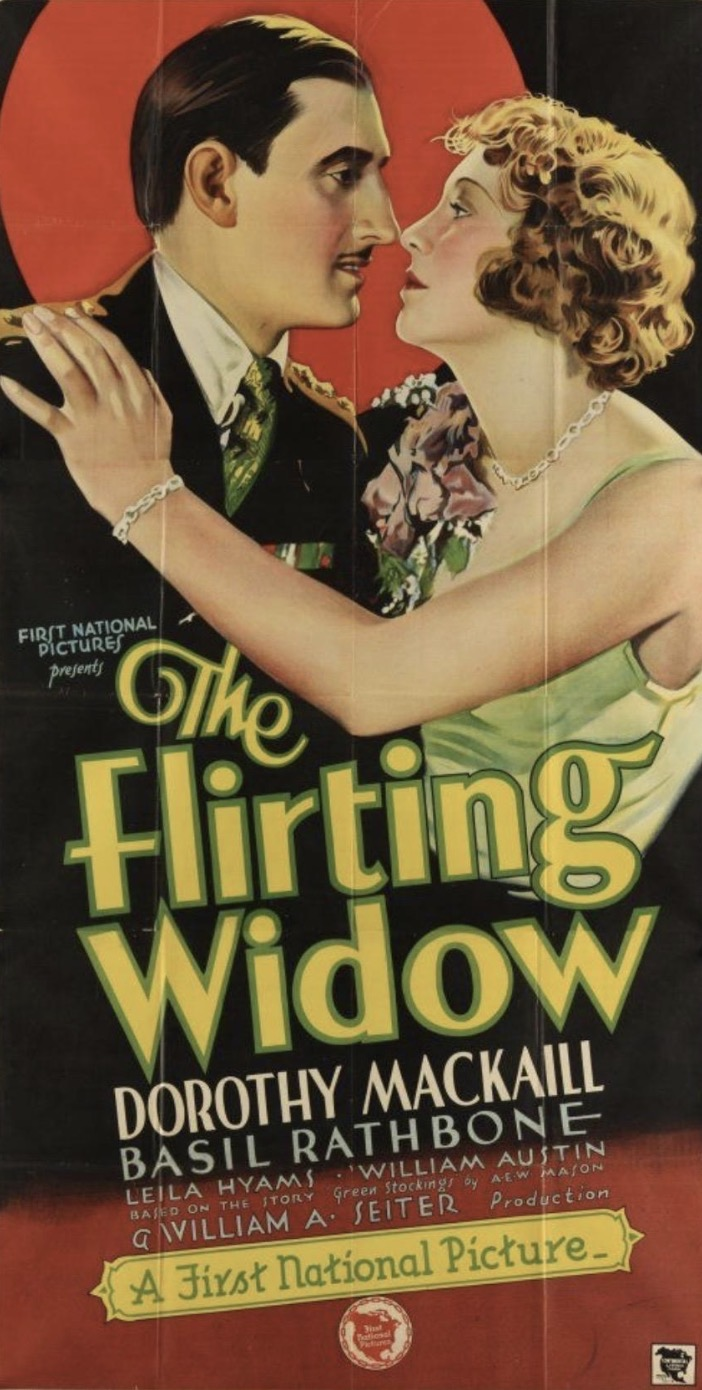
- Theatrical release poster
- Directed by: William A. Seiter
- Screenplay by: John F. Goodrich
- Based on: Green Stockings; 1911 play by A.E.W. Mason
- Produced by: William A. Seiter
- Starring: Dorothy Mackaill; Basil Rathbone; Leila Hyams; William Austin; Claude Gillingwater
- Cinematography: Sidney Hickox
- Edited by: John F. Goodrich
- Music by: Alois Reiser
- Production company: First National Pictures
- Distributed by: First National Pictures
- Release date: May 11, 1930
- Running time: 72 minutes
- Country: United States
- Language: English
- Budget: $179,000
- Box office: $348,000

The Flirting Widow is a 1930 American pre-Code comedy film directed by William A. Seiter and starring Dorothy Mackaill, Basil Rathbone, Leila Hyams and Claude Gillingwater. It was produced and released by First National Pictures, a subsidiary of Warner Bros.

The film's plot is based on the story Green Stockings by A. E. W. Mason. The film had been previously made as a synchronized sound film (with a musical score and sound effects) in 1927 under the title of Slightly Used by Warner Bros. Pictures. Another sound version was made in 1933 as Her Imaginary Lover at the Teddington Studios, the British branch of Warner Bros.-First National Productions.

== Plot ==
William Faraday refuses to let his youngest daughter, Evelyn, get married before her older sister, Celia. Celia, who has no interest in getting married, takes pity on Evelyn and her suitor Bobby and pretends to have gotten engaged to Colonel John Smith during a short vacation away from home. To avoid difficulties, she states that Smith has sailed to join the British Field Force in Arabia. When her father receives this news, he consents to Evelyn's marriage.

At Evelyn's insistence, Celia writes a love letter to her fiancé, never intending to send it. She later burns the magazine in which she hid the letter, unaware someone has posted it already. The letter is received by a real Colonel Smith stationed in Arabia. He is amused and curious.

After Evelyn's marriage, Celia publishes a death notice in the London Daily Times for her Colonel Smith. The real Smith decides to pay a visit to Celia, pretending to be a close friend of the deceased bringing some mementos. When he gives them to Celia, she is uncomfortable. She eventually realizes "Colonel Vaughan" is not who he says he is, but over the course of a single night, they fall in love.

== Cast ==
- Dorothy Mackaill as Celia
- Basil Rathbone as Colonel Smith
- Leila Hyams as Evelyn
- William Austin as James Raleigh
- Claude Gillingwater as Faraday
- Emily Fitzroy as Aunt Ida
- Flora Bramley as Phyllis
- Anthony Bushell as Bobby
- Wilfred Noy as Martin

== Box office ==
According to Warner Bros., the film earned $234,000 domestically and $114,000 from foreign showings.

== Preservation ==
The film survives intact and has been broadcast on both television and cable. It is also preserved in the Library of Congress collection.
