= Charles Byer =

American film actor (1893–1953)

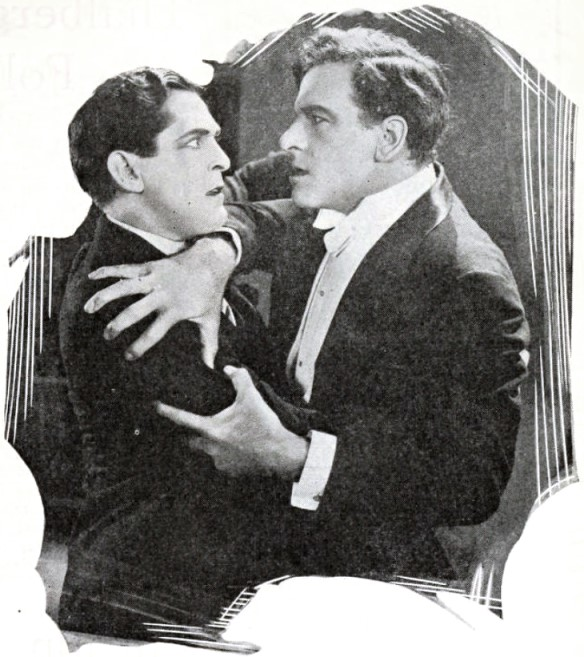
- Still from The Unguarded Hour (1925) with Milton Sills and Charles Byer
- Born: February 28, 1893; Newark, New Jersey, U.S.
- Died: November 28, 1953 (aged 60); Los Angeles, California, U.S.
- Occupation: Actor
- Years active: 1916–1929

Charles Byer (February 28, 1893 – November 28, 1953) was an American film actor of the silent era. He appeared in films for a variety of companies including Fox, Paramount, Tiffany, and First National Pictures. He played a mixture of supporting and leading roles.

== Selected filmography ==
- Headin' Home (1920)
- Ten Nights in a Bar Room (1921)
- The Man Who Paid (1922)
- How Women Love (1922)
- Lost in a Big City (1923)
- Unseeing Eyes (1923)
- The Trail of the Law (1924)
- Week End Husbands (1924)
- Youth for Sale (1924)
- The Unguarded Hour (1925)
- A Man Must Live (1925)
- The Shock Punch (1925)
- The Pace That Thrills (1925)
- The Virgin Wife (1926)
- So's Your Old Man (1926)
- Shanghai Bound (1927)
- New York (1927)
- Cabaret (1927)
- Beautiful But Dumb (1928)
- Taxi 13 (1928)
- Clothes Make the Woman (1928)
- Dead Man's Curve (1928)
- A Horseman of the Plains(1928)
- Alex the Great (1928)
- Red Riders of Canada (1928)
- Side Street (1929)
- The Delightful Rogue (1929)
- Molly and Me (1929)
- Red Hot Speed (1929)
- Romance of the Rio Grande (1929)

== Bibliography ==
- Bruce Babington & Charles Barr. The Call of the Heart: John M. Stahl and Hollywood Melodrama. Indiana University Press, 2018.
