= Shanghai Bound =

1927 film

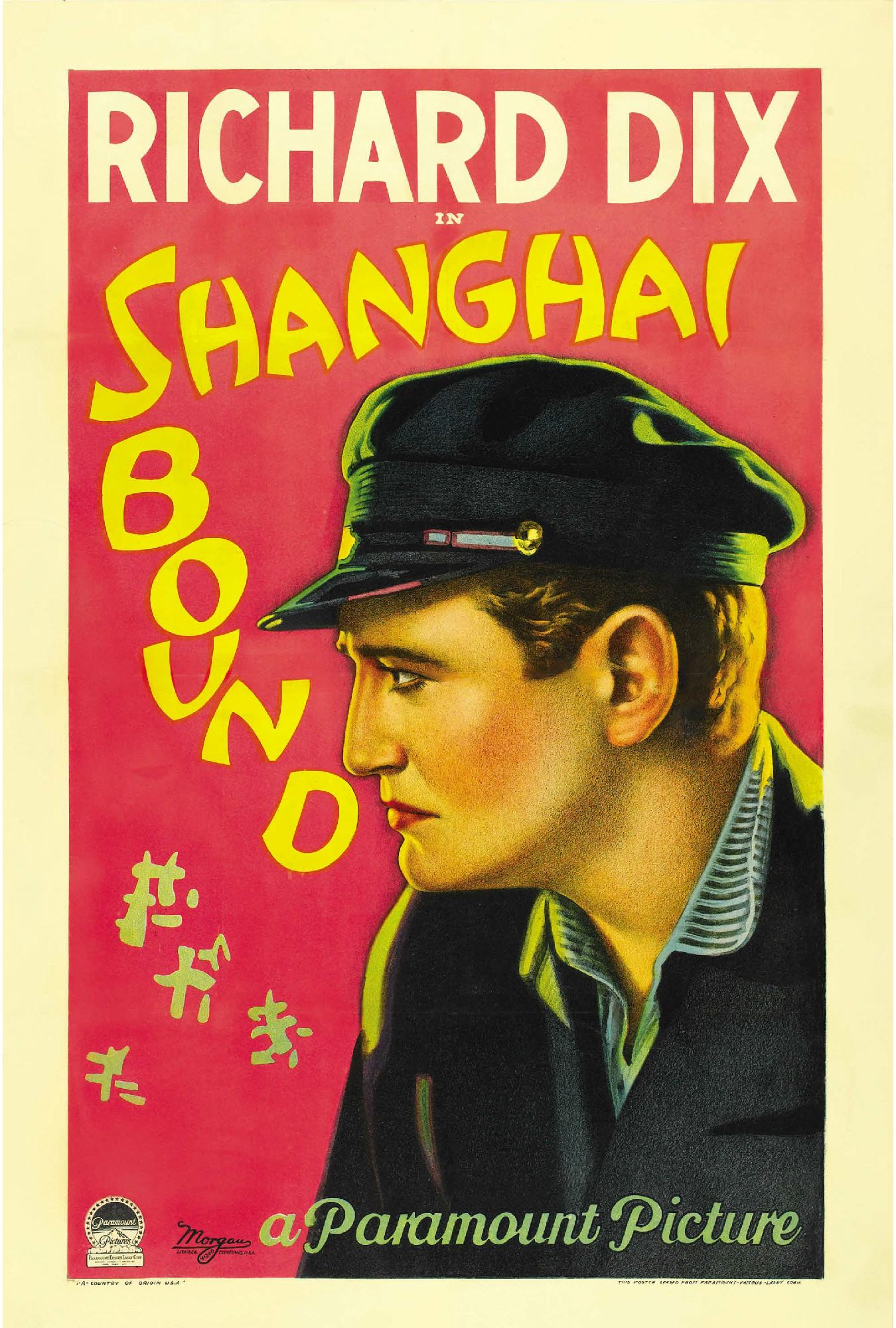
- Theatrical release poster
- Directed by: Luther Reed
- Screenplay by: John F. Goodrich; Ray Harris; Julian Johnson; E.S. O'Reilly
- Produced by: Jesse L. Lasky; Adolph Zukor
- Starring: Richard Dix; Mary Brian; Charles Byer; George Irving
- Cinematography: Edward Cronjager
- Production company: Famous Players–Lasky Corporation
- Distributed by: Paramount Pictures
- Release date: October 15, 1927
- Running time: 60 minutes
- Country: United States
- Language: Silent (English intertitles)

Shanghai Bound is a lost 1927 American silent adventure film directed by Luther Reed and written by John F. Goodrich, Ray Harris, Julian Johnson, and E.S. O'Reilly. The film stars Richard Dix, Mary Brian, Charles Byer, George Irving, Jocelyn Lee, Tom Maguire, and Frank Chew. The film was released on October 15, 1927, by Paramount Pictures.

== Cast ==
- Richard Dix as Jim Bucklin
- Mary Brian as Sheila
- Charles Byer as Payson
- George Irving as Louden
- Jocelyn Lee as Shanghai Rose
- Tom Maguire as Smith
- Frank Chew as Yen
- Allan Cavan
- Tom Gubbins as Local Agent
- Arthur Hoyt as Algy
- Tetsu Komai as Scarface

== Production ==
Shanghai Bound was partially filmed on location at the Sacramento River.
