= Father Steps Out (1941 film) =

1941 film by Jean Yarbrough

- Directed by: Jean Yarbrough
- Written by: Edmond Kelso; George Waggner
- Produced by: Lindsley Parsons; William T. Lackey
- Starring: Frank Albertson; Jed Prouty; Lorna Gray
- Cinematography: Mack Stengler
- Edited by: Jack Ogilvie
- Music by: Edward J. Kay
- Production company: Monogram Pictures
- Distributed by: Monogram Pictures
- Release date: July 19, 1941
- Running time: 63 minutes
- Country: United States
- Language: English

Father Steps Out is a 1941 American comedy film directed by Jean Yarbrough and starring Frank Albertson, Jed Prouty, Lorna Gray and Frank Faylen. It is a remake of the 1934 film City Limits. It was written by Joseph West and is the second entry in the "Latham Family" series produced by Monogram Pictures.

== Plot ==
Jimmy Dugan is a shotgun newspaper journalist who would kill to get a scoop. He finds a lead to a great business story and manages to get an interview with the subject in question, J.B. Matthews, who is the CEO of Bay Shore Railroad. Matthews company owns the Midland Central Railroad, where Tom Oliver is in charge. Jimmy pretends to be Matthews physician and gains access to his mansion to perform a physical examination. He orders Matthews to relieve stress by taking a weeks vacation. While he performs the physical, Matthews’ daughter Helen discovers that Jimmy isn't a real doctor, but intrigued by the reason for the charade, she keeps quiet and doesn't tell her father. Jimmy comes back to the mansion the day after when the family has left on their vacation, to search the house for leads to his story. He finds out that the family is on a train vacation, and takes a car to follow the train by road.

Jimmy goes through a great ordeal to catch up with the train; he crashes his car and steals a police motorcycle. Eventually he manages to board the train, but at the same time, Matthews jumps off the train to escape his nagging sister. Matthews became acquainted with two hoboes living near the railroad tracks, and his wife Martha panics when she finds out he isn't aboard the train anymore. Matthews is soon reported missing and his rival Tom Oliver start scheming to take control of the enterprise on his own. Jimmy reports back to his editor that the railroad tycoon is missing. There is a reward set to the person who can leave information leading to finding Matthews, but he is quite comfortable where he is with his new friends. Before the Bay Shore is sold to Midland, someone who has met Matthews in his new environment reveals his whereabouts. Jimmy helps find the tycoon and get him back before his assets are sold off by the bank. Jimmy wins the respect and heart of Helen, and the hoboes come and visit Matthews at the mansion.

== Cast ==
- Frank Albertson as Jimmy Dugan
- Jed Prouty as John B. Matthews
- Lorna Gray as Helen Matthews
- Frank Faylen as Tall Hobo 'King'
- John Dilson as Tom Oliver
- Charlie Hall as Short Hobo 'Nap', aka Napoleon
- Kathryn Sheldon as Aunt Martha Matthews
- John Maxwell as City Editor Macy
- Mary Field as Mrs. Benton, Farm Woman
- Tristram Coffin as Dr. R. G. Stafford
- Paul Maxey as Jenks, the Butler
- J. Arthur Young as Banker
- Gene O'Donnell as Jones
- I. Stanford Jolley as Oliver's Secretary
