= The Legend of Robin Hood (1968 film) =

1968 film

The Legend of Robin Hood is a 90-minute TV musical aired by NBC in 1968.

Douglas Fairbanks Jr. played King Richard the Lionheart.

== Cast ==
- David Watson as Robin Hood
- Douglas Fairbanks Jr. as Richard the Lionheart
- Lee Beery as Maid Marian
- Walter Slezak as Friar Tuck
- Noel Harrison as Alan-a-Dale
- Steve Forrest as the Sheriff of Nottingham
- Victor Buono as Sir Guy of Gisbourne
- Bruce Yarnell as Little John
- Roddy McDowall as Prince John
