= Night of Terror =

1933 film by Benjamin Stoloff

- Directed by: Benjamin Stoloff
- Written by: Willard Mack; Beatrice Van; Lester Neilson; William Jacobs
- Produced by: Bryan Foy
- Starring: Bela Lugosi; Sally Blane; Wallace Ford; Tully Marshall
- Cinematography: Joseph A. Valentine
- Edited by: Arthur Hilton
- Distributed by: Columbia Pictures
- Release date: April 24, 1933
- Running time: 61 minutes
- Country: United States
- Language: English

Night of Terror is a 1933 American pre-Code horror film directed by Benjamin Stoloff, and starring Bela Lugosi, Sally Blane, Wallace Ford, and Tully Marshall. Despite receiving top billing, Bela Lugosi has a relatively small part. The film is also known as He Lived to Kill and Terror in the Night.

== Plot ==
Police have been vainly searching the countryside for the knife-wielding Maniac, who has been on a murderous spree. The Maniac's victims are each found with a taunting newspaper clipping attached to their body. After the wealthy uncle of a young scientist is mysteriously murdered, people wonder if the Maniac is responsible.

Prior to his uncle's death, the young scientist in question, Dr. Arthur Hornsby, claimed to have developed a method of living without oxygen for extended periods. To prove his theory, he had himself buried after taking a dose of the serum. Despite his incapacity, the death of his uncle leaves a vast fortune, which is to be divided amongst his family members and servants. In the event that one or more them dies, the inheritance is split among the remaining survivors. Subsequently, members of the family begin to die, one-by-one, and suspicion is cast on the servants, including the "mystic" butler (Bela Lugosi).

At the end, we discover that Dr. Hornsby faked his burial and was using it as a cover for committing the murders. His plan was to kill any other heirs to his uncle's fortune so that he might obtain sole possession. His plan is eventually discovered and exposed by the butler. The Maniac is shot, and apparently killed, by the newspaper reporter, Tom Hartley; but in the closing moments of the film, he comes back to life and claims that he will haunt the audience if they reveal the plot twist to anyone.

== Cast ==
- Bela Lugosi as Degar
- Sally Blane as Mary Rinehart
- Wallace Ford as Tom Hartley
- Tully Marshall as Richard Rinehart
- George Meeker as Arthur Hornsby
- Edwin Maxwell as The Maniac (end sequence only)
- Gertrude Michael as Sarah Rinehart
- Bryant Washburn as John Rinehart
- Mary Frey as Sika, Degar's wife

== Production ==
In an attempt to bail himself out of debt, Bela Lugosi was working a heavy schedule, including the filming of International House by day and Night of Terror by night. There is a seance scene where Sika, Degar's wife is about to reveal the killer, but is murdered before she can say the name. This scene was filmed during an aftershock of the Long Beach Earthquake. With the hot lights jiggling over the actors they were nervous but since many were originally stage actors they kept on going. The expressions were so intense that the director said it was perfect and didn't need any retakes.

== See also ==
- Bela Lugosi filmography
