= Man Bait (1926 film) =

1926 film by Donald Crisp

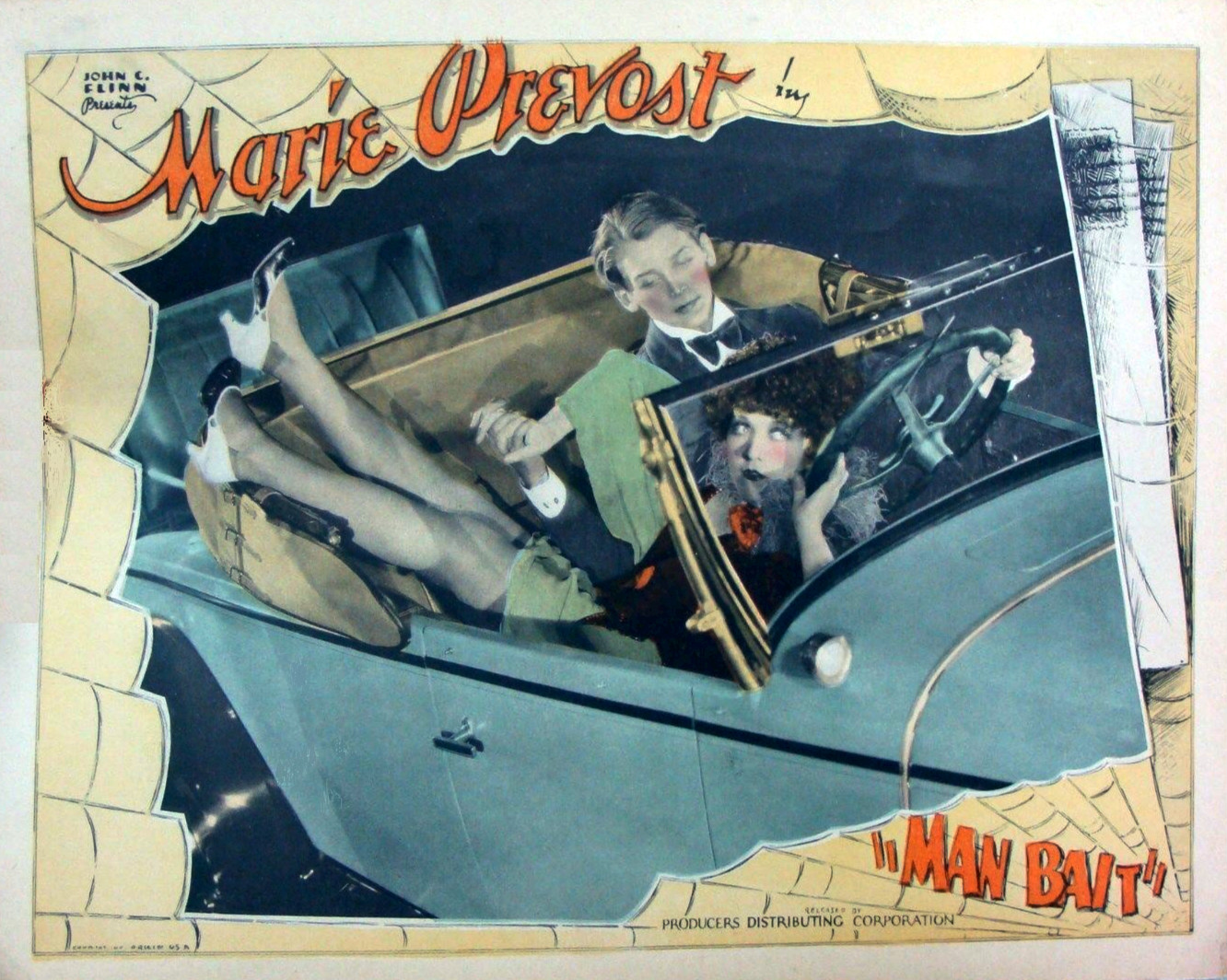
- Lobby card
- Directed by: Donald Crisp
- Written by: Douglas Z. Doty
- Based on: "Man Bait" by Norman Houston
- Starring: Marie Prevost; Douglas Fairbanks Jr.; Kenneth Thomson
- Cinematography: Harold Rosson
- Production company: Metropolitan Pictures Corporation of California
- Distributed by: Producers Distributing Corporation
- Release date: December 27, 1926
- Running time: 6 reels
- Country: United States
- Language: Silent (English intertitles)

Man Bait is a 1926 American silent comedy film directed by Donald Crisp and starring Marie Prevost, Douglas Fairbanks Jr., and Kenneth Thomson.

== Plot ==
After she is fired from her role as a shopgirl in a department store, Madge finds work as a taxi dancer. At the dance hall she meets and falls in love with a young man from a wealthy background.

== Cast ==
- Marie Prevost as Madge Dreyer
- Kenneth Thomson as Gerald Sanford
- Douglas Fairbanks Jr. as Jeff Sanford
- Louis Natheaux as Delancy Hasbrouck
- Eddie Gribbon as Red Welch
- Betty Francisco as Betty Gerber
- Adda Gleason as Florence Hasbrouck
- Sally Rand as Nancy
- Fritzi Ridgeway as Gloria

== Preservation ==
With no prints of Man Bait located in any film archives, it is a lost film.

== Bibliography ==
- Jeffrey Vance & Tony Maietta. Douglas Fairbanks. University of California Press, 2008. ISBN 978-0-520-25667-5
