= Once a Sinner (1931 film) =

1931 film

- Directed by: Guthrie McClintic
- Screenplay by: George Middleton
- Starring: Dorothy Mackaill; Joel McCrea; John Halliday; C. Henry Gordon; Ilka Chase; Sally Blane
- Cinematography: Arthur L. Todd
- Edited by: Ralph Dietrich
- Production company: Fox Film Corporation
- Distributed by: Fox Film Corporation
- Release date: January 25, 1931
- Running time: 71 minutes
- Country: United States
- Language: English

Once a Sinner is a 1931 American pre-Code romance film directed by Guthrie McClintic and written by George Middleton. The film stars Dorothy Mackaill, Joel McCrea, John Halliday, C. Henry Gordon, Ilka Chase and Sally Blane. The film was released on January 25, 1931, by Fox Film Corporation. As of January 2026, the film is preserved by the UCLA Film & Television Archive.

== Plot ==
Diana Barry, a fashionable New Yorker, gives up her luxurious apartment to move to the small town of Sparta and marry Tommy Mason, a young inventor, turning down an offer of financial help from her wealthy former lover, Dick Kent. Once settled in Sparta, Diana confesses to Tommy that she once had an affair with an older man, but he refuses to learn the man's name or any details, and the couple agree to put the matter behind them.

A year later, Tommy—who has developed a device for transmitting sound and pictures over a telephone line—is invited by an investment corporation to spend three months in New York at its expense while it considers financing his invention. Reluctant to return to the city, Diana agrees to go. There, the corporation's broker, James Brett, champions the invention to the firm's president, who turns out to be Dick Kent. When Diana and Kent are introduced at a dinner-dance, the two pretend to be meeting for the first time, but Tommy is unsettled to realize how many people at the club recognize his wife.

Tommy comes to suspect that Brett, a noted ladies' man, was Diana's former lover, and threatens to withhold his invention if his suspicions prove correct. Diana refuses to tell him about Kent, and over the following months their marriage grows miserable under Tommy's jealousy and badgering. On her birthday, after Brett sends her flowers, Diana finally assures Tommy that Brett was not the man, declares that her past belongs to her alone, and leaves him. When her friend Kitty King invites her to Paris with Kitty's fiancé, Serge Ratoff, Diana reluctantly accepts.

The following spring, having lost her job as a model, Diana is courted by Ratoff, who claims that Kitty has left him and lavishes attention on her. Tommy, though resentful that Kent had financed his invention on Diana's account, sets out to find her and traces her to one of Ratoff's clubs, where Ratoff presses a pearl necklace on her; she refuses it but agrees to wear it for the evening. Barred from the club, Tommy is eventually escorted inside by Ratoff's discarded former mistress. Diana sees the woman kiss Tommy after he gives her money to gamble and, noticing that he has spotted the necklace, concludes that he has come not out of love but to "save" her at Kent's urging. As Diana goes upstairs with Ratoff and a disgusted Tommy prepares to leave, his escort confesses that Ratoff's rejection had once driven her to soliciting men on the streets. Tommy forces his way past Ratoff's bodyguards, interrupts him, apologizes to Diana, and tells her that he loves and needs her, and the two reconcile.

== Cast ==
- Dorothy Mackaill as Diana Barry
- Joel McCrea as Tommy Mason
- John Halliday as Richard Kent
- C. Henry Gordon as Serge Ratoff
- Ilka Chase as Kitty King
- Sally Blane as Hope Patterson
- Nanette Faro as Marie
- Clara Blandick as Mrs. Mason
- Myra Hampton as Mrs. Nolan
- George Brent as James Brent
