= National Register of Historic Places listings in Todd County, Kentucky =

Location of Todd County in Kentucky

This is a list of the National Register of Historic Places listings in Todd County, Kentucky.

This is intended to be a complete list of the properties and districts on the National Register of Historic Places in Todd County, Kentucky, United States. The locations of National Register properties and districts for which the latitude and longitude coordinates are included below, may be seen in a map.

There are 15 properties and districts listed on the National Register in the county.

This National Park Service list is complete through NPS recent listings posted June 13, 2025.

== Current listings ==
	Name on the Register	Image	Date listed	Location	City or town	Description
1	Allensville Historic District	Allensville Historic District	November 14, 1988 (#88002611)	Kentucky Route 102/Main St. 36°42′58″N 87°04′06″W	Allensville	
2	Bethel Baptist Church	Bethel Baptist Church	November 17, 1977 (#77000651)	U.S. Route 68; 36°50′37″N 87°17′55″W	Fairview	
3	Jefferson Davis Monument	Jefferson Davis Monument	May 9, 1973 (#73000849)	On Kentucky Route 115 near its junction with U.S. Route 68; 36°50′31″N 87°18′02″W	Fairview	
4	Edwards Hall	Edwards Hall	January 11, 1974 (#74000906)	Southern side of Goebel Ave. 36°48′14″N 87°09′07″W	Elkton	
5	Elkton Commercial Historic District	Elkton Commercial Historic District	November 13, 1989 (#89001976)	Junction of N., S., E., and W. Main Sts. 36°48′34″N 87°09′15″W	Elkton	
6	Gray's Inn	Gray's Inn	November 26, 2004 (#04001254)	88 Graysville Rd. 36°38′46″N 87°11′57″W	Guthrie	
7	John Gray Springhouse	John Gray Springhouse	January 8, 1987 (#87000146)	U.S. Route 68; 36°48′42″N 87°09′32″W	Elkton	
8	Guthrie Historic District	Guthrie Historic District	November 10, 2011 (#11000801)	Roughly bounded by Ewing, Park & Cherry Sts. 36°38′54″N 87°09′59″W	Guthrie	
9	Hadden Site (15TO1)		December 19, 1985 (#85003218)	Address Restricted	Elkton	
10	Idlewild	Idlewild	April 10, 1980 (#80001670)	Southeast of Trenton on U.S. Route 41; 36°42′46″N 87°15′01″W	Trenton	
11	McReynolds House	McReynolds House	October 22, 1976 (#76000946)	S. Main St. 36°48′25″N 87°09′18″W	Elkton	
12	Milliken Memorial Community House	Milliken Memorial Community House	December 6, 1990 (#90001834)	208 W. Main St. 36°48′37″N 87°09′21″W	Elkton	
13	W.L. Reeves House	W.L. Reeves House	February 2, 1984 (#84002024)	Kentucky Route 102; 36°48′06″N 87°08′55″W	Elkton	
14	Todd County Courthouse	Todd County Courthouse	August 22, 1975 (#75000836)	Public Sq. 36°48′34″N 87°09′15″W	Elkton	
15	Woodstock	Woodstock	November 10, 2010 (#10000904)	6338 Clarksville Rd. 36°38′40″N 87°18′44″W	Trenton	1896-built plantation house, a home of write Dorothy Dix.

== See also ==
- List of National Historic Landmarks in Kentucky
- National Register of Historic Places listings in Kentucky
