= Guthrie Historic District =

Guthrie Historic District can refer to: (sorted by state)

- Guthrie Historic District (Guthrie, Kentucky), listed on the National Register of Historic Places (NRHP) in Todd County
- Guthrie Historic District (Guthrie, Oklahoma), listed on the NRHP in Logan County
