= William Walcutt =

American sculptor

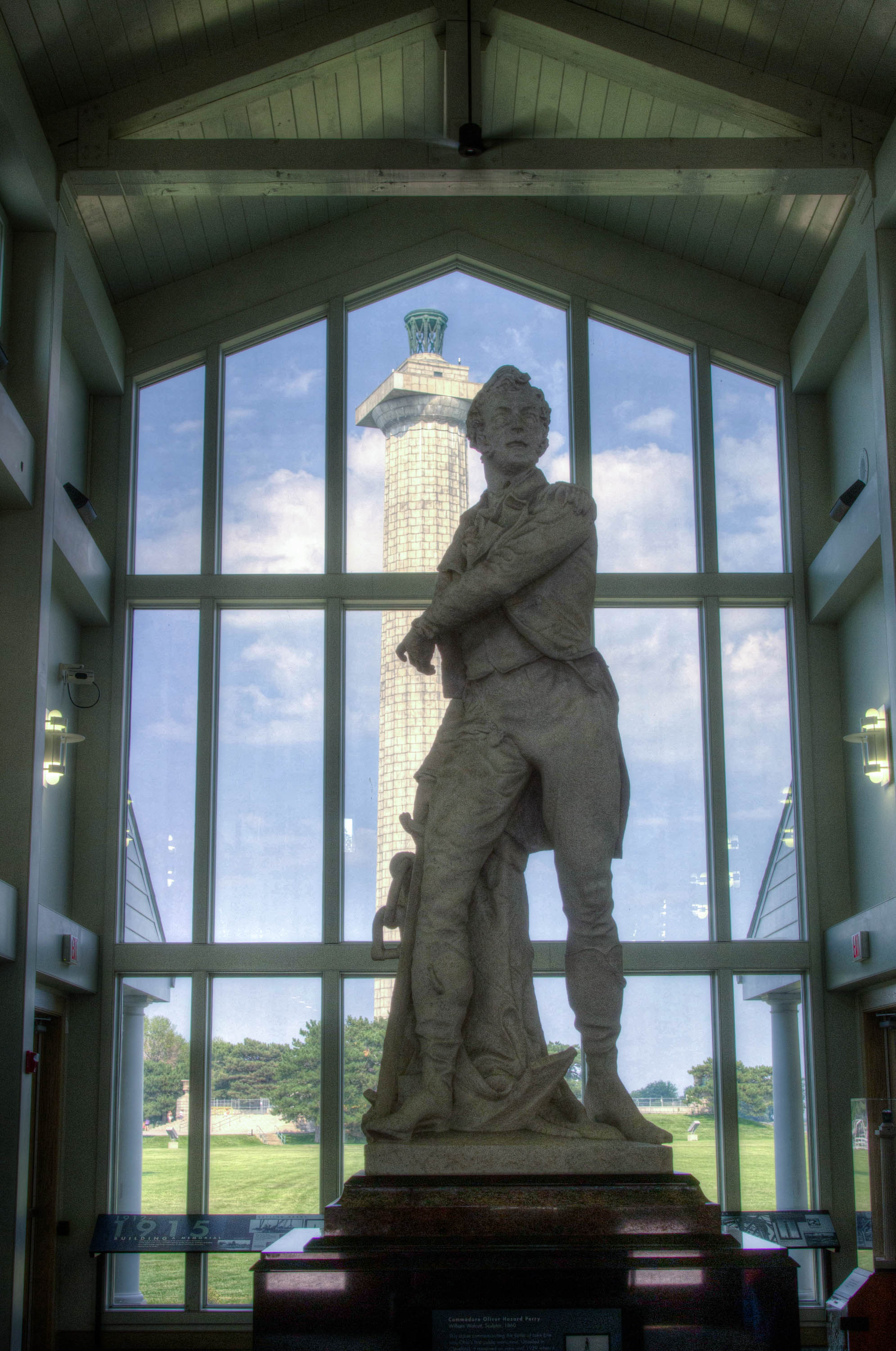
Oliver Hazard Perry (marble, 1860), Perry's Victory and International Peace Memorial.

William Walcutt (April 28, 1818, Columbus, Ohio – April 22, 1882, New York City) was an American painter and sculptor, best remembered for the Perry Monument in Cleveland, Ohio.

== Biography ==
He studied in London in 1852, followed by two years in Paris studying painting with Adolphe Yvon and sculpture at the École Impériale et Spéciale des Beaux-Arts. He returned to the United States in 1854, and opened a studio in New York City.

His most famous work is the Commodore Oliver Hazard Perry Monument (1860), that originally stood in the Public Square in Cleveland, Ohio. The monument was relocated several times, and since 1991 has stood in Fort Huntington Park, beside the Cuyahoga County Courthouse. His weathered marble statue of Perry was replaced with a bronze copy in 1928. A second bronze copy stands outside the Rhode Island Statehouse, in Providence, Rhode Island. The original marble is now displayed inside the visitor center at the Perry's Victory and International Peace Memorial in Put-in-Bay, Ohio. Walcutt's statue appears on the 2013 "Perry's Victory" quarter.

His 1857 historical painting, Pulling Down the Statue of George III, is in the collection of Lafayette College in Easton, Pennsylvania. Portraits of Taft family members by him are at the William Howard Taft National Historic Site in Cincinnati, Ohio.

A Neoclassical statue by him, Musidora (marble, 1868), is in the High Museum of Art in Atlanta, Georgia. He may have modeled the original statue – possibly copied from a European source – for The Boy with the Boot, a zinc fountain sculpture that was patented in 1875 by J. L. Mott Iron Works of New York City. Mott mass-produced the statue into the 1910s (as The Unfortunate Boot); and other manufacturers continued production into the 1950s. The example in Sandusky, Ohio, moved inside the City Building following vandalism in the 1990s, is credited to Walcutt.

Walcutt's papers are at the Archives of American Art at the Smithsonian Institution.

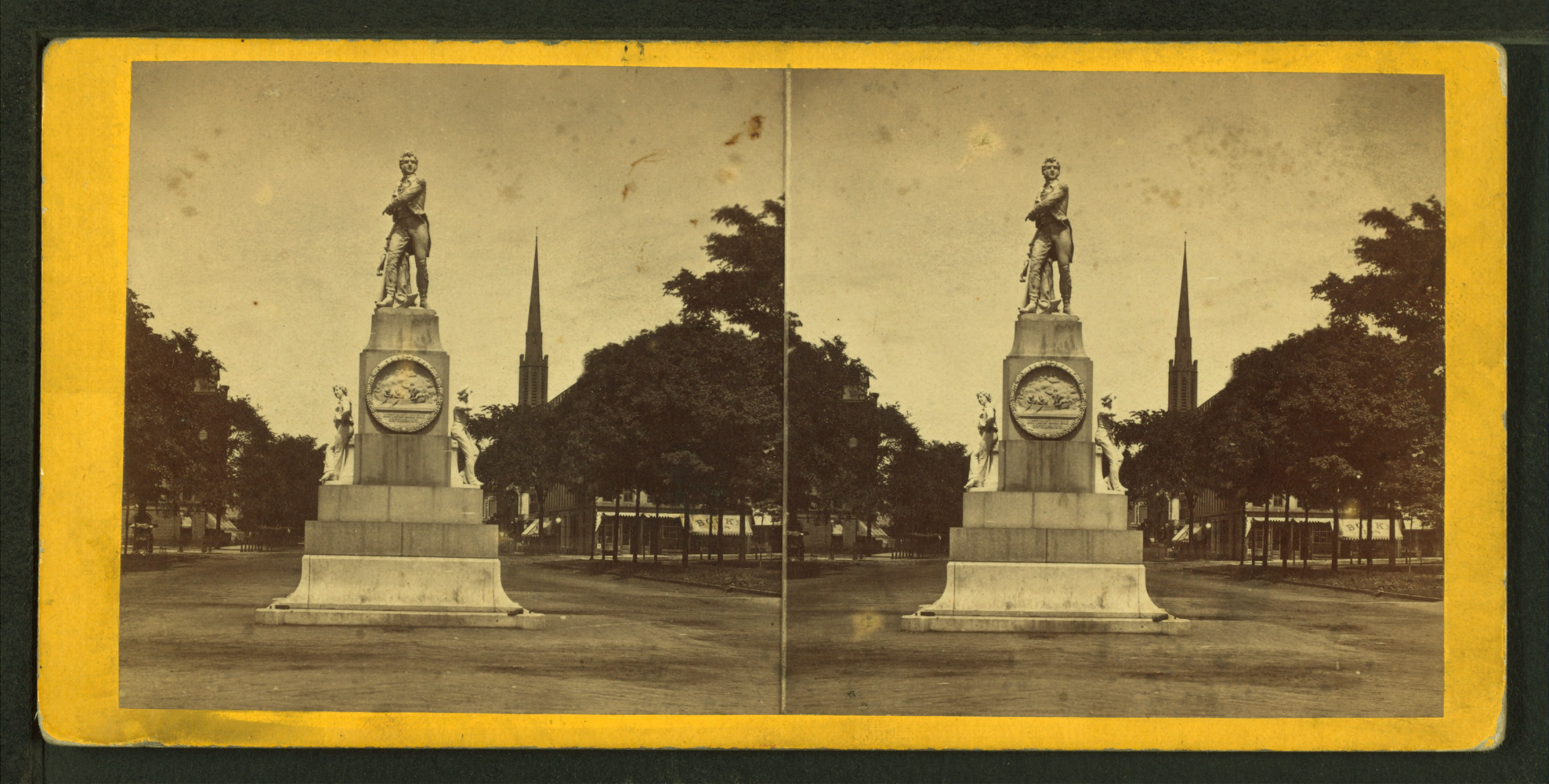
Perry Monument (1860), Public Square, Cleveland, Ohio.

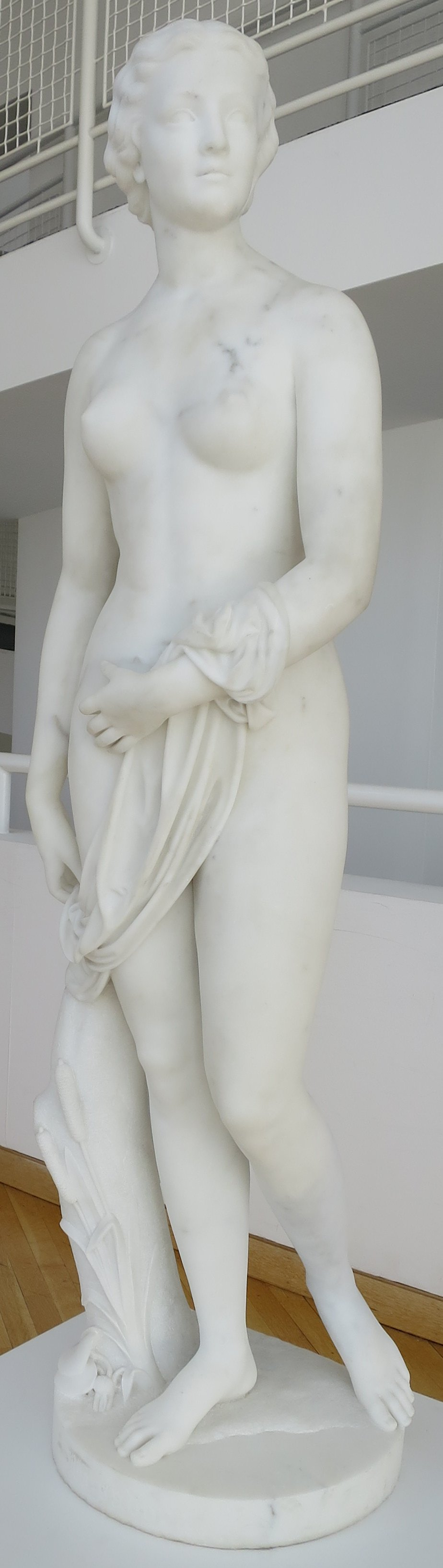
Musidora (marble, 1868), High Museum of Art.

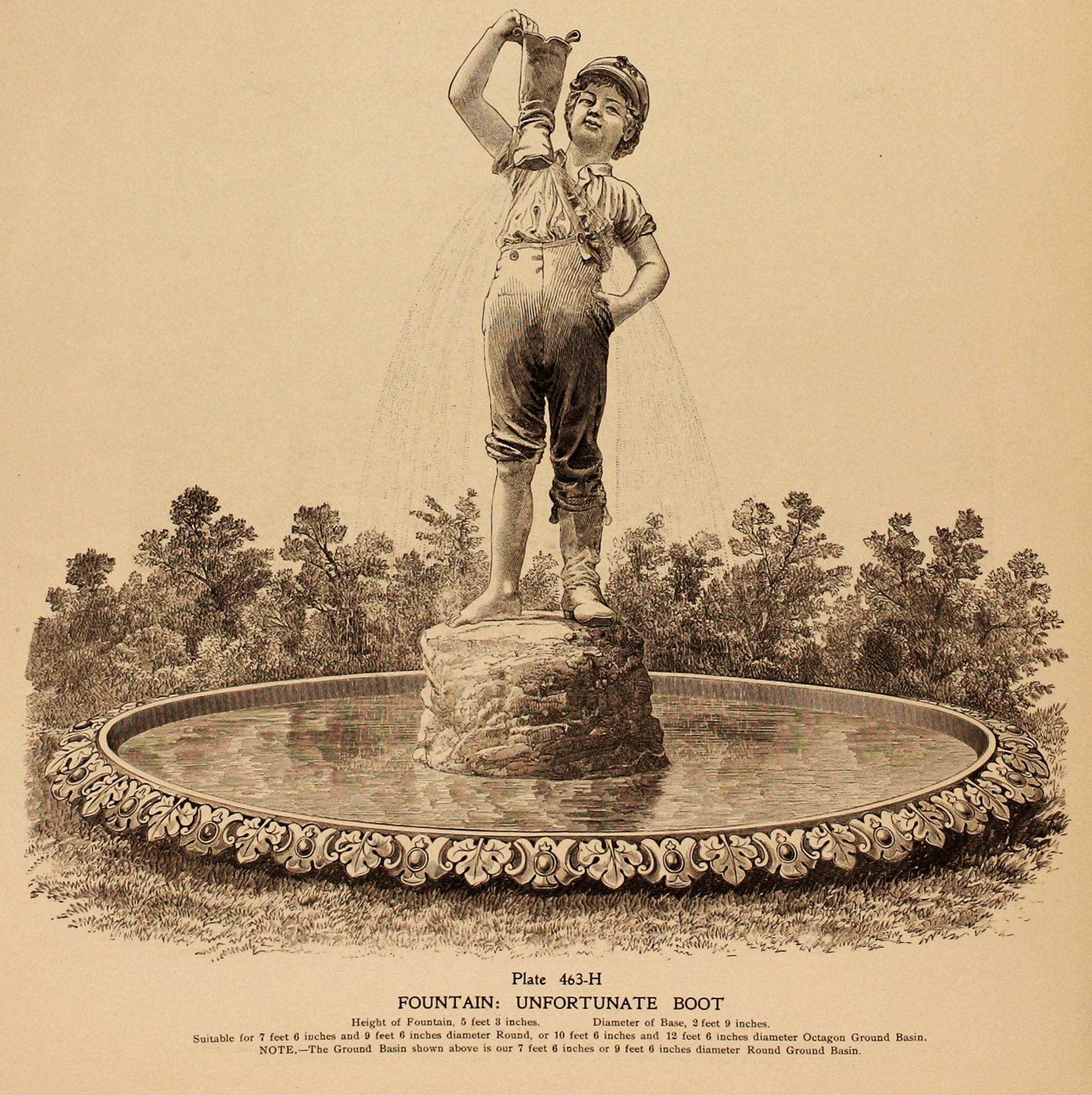
The Boy with the Boot (c.1875).
