= Todd County Courthouse =

Todd County Courthouse may refer to:

- Todd County Courthouse (Kentucky), listed on the National Register of Historic Places (NRHP)
- Todd County Courthouse (Minnesota), also NRHP-listed
