= Perry Monument =

Perry Monument may refer to:

- Perry Monument, Presque Isle State Park, Erie, Pennsylvania
- Perry's Victory and International Peace Memorial, Put-in-Bay, Ohio
