= Perry Monument (Cleveland) =

War monument in Cleveland, Ohio

Commodore Oliver Hazard Perry Monument
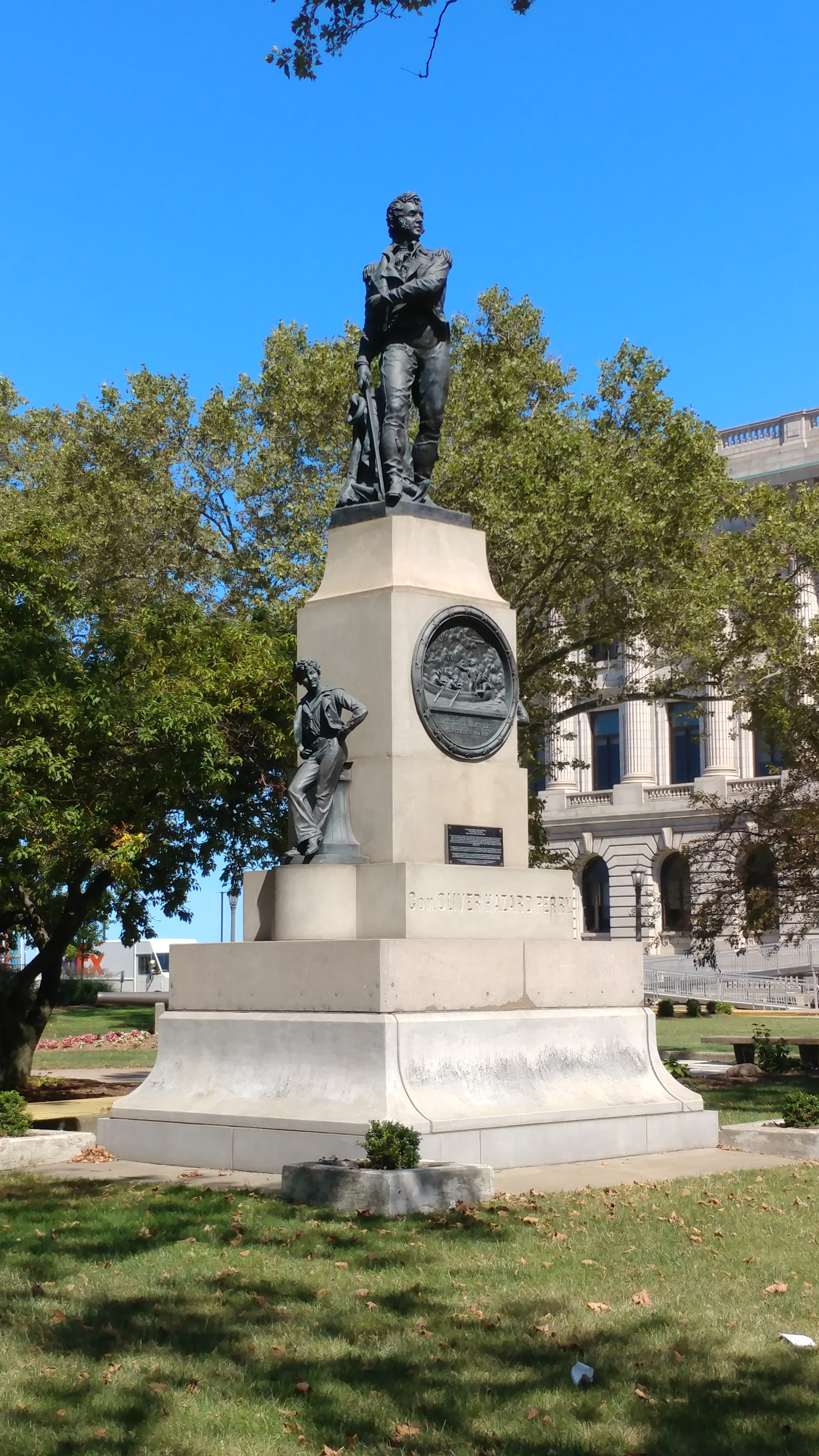
- The monument at Fort Huntington Park in downtown Cleveland, Ohio
- Interactive map of Commodore Oliver Hazard Perry Monument
- Location: Fort Huntington Park, Lakeside Ave. & W. 3rd St., Cleveland, Ohio
- Coordinates: 41.50255°N 81.69805°W
- Designer: William Walcutt; T. Jones & Sons (contractor)
- Type: War monument
- Material: Base & pedestal: granite Original statuary: white marble Replacement statuary: bronze
- Height: Perry statue: 10 ft (3.0 m); Overall: 26 ft (7.9 m)
- Completion date: 1860
- Dedicated to: Oliver Hazard Perry
- Moved to present location in 1991.

Commodore Oliver Hazard Perry Monument is a war monument in Cleveland, Ohio, that commemorates Oliver Hazard Perry and his victory at the Battle of Lake Erie in the War of 1812. Erected at the center of the city's Public Square in 1860, its Perry statue by sculptor William Walcutt was Ohio's first monumental sculpture.

The monument was relocated several times in Cleveland. After replacing the original marble statues with bronze castings in 1929, the original statues were placed in storage and in 1937 were given to the city of Perrysburg, Ohio, where they resided until 1997 when the originals were replaced with bronze castings. Since 2002, the original statue of Perry has been loaned to the Perry's Victory and International Peace Memorial in the village of Put-in-Bay, Ohio, on South Bass Island. The original Sailor Boy and Midshipman statues reside in the lobby of the Perrysburg Municipal Building.

== Perry's victory ==
Perry's victory against the British Navy at the Battle of Lake Erie occurred on September 10, 1813.

== Monument ==
In June 1857, Cleveland City Council unanimously adopted resolutions to erect a monument to Commodore Oliver Perry in the city's Public Square. By October, Thomas Jones & Sons Marble Works, of Cleveland, was selected as contractor. The project had a budget of $6,000, to be raised from contributions by the citizens of Cleveland. Prominent sculptors Hiram Powers, Thomas Ball, and E. D. Palmer were approached for the Perry statue, but demurred due to the limited budget. The contractor turned to William Walcutt, who produced a new design that was endorsed by the monument committee. City Council granted T. Jones & Sons the power to solicit funds for an additional $2,000 over the project's contracted budget. Fund-raising fell well short of the $8,000 target, and in 1860 City Council appropriated $3,008 to make up the deficit.

Walcutt, a sculptor originally from Columbus, Ohio, had studied in London and Paris, and kept a studio in New York City. In addition to the larger-than-life Perry statue, his design proposed a stepped base with two subsidiary sailor figures ("Sailor Boy", "Midshipman"), and a pedestal featuring a round bas-relief vignette of the battle.

The monument was dedicated on September 10, 1860, the 47th anniversary of the Battle of Lake Erie. Over 100,000 people attended its unveiling, which featured speeches by Harvey Rice, chairman of the monument committee, historian George Bancroft, and the governors of Ohio and Rhode Island (Perry's home state). Following the dedication ceremony, a mock battle was staged offshore, and a grand military parade was held the following day. Public Square became known as Monumental Park, in recognition of the sculpture.

In 1878, the monument was relocated from the intersection at the center of Public Square to the square's southeast quadrant. It was removed in 1892 to make way for construction of Cleveland's Soldiers' and Sailors' Monument. Following two years in storage, it was re-erected in Wade Park in 1894, overlooking Wade Lagoon. The monument was removed in 1913 to make way for construction of the Cleveland Museum of Art, and relocated to Gordon Park. By 1927 winds and rain had deteriorated the statues of Perry, Sailor Boy, and the Midshipman. The Early Settlers Association raised $10,000 to replace them with bronze castings, which were unveiled in Gordon Park in 1929. They were relocated within Gordon Park in 1951, and put into storage in 1988. Following restoration, the bronze statues and monument were re-erected in 1991 at a sixth (and current) location – Fort Huntington Park, on the east side of the Cuyahoga County Courthouse, in downtown Cleveland.

=== Sculptures ===
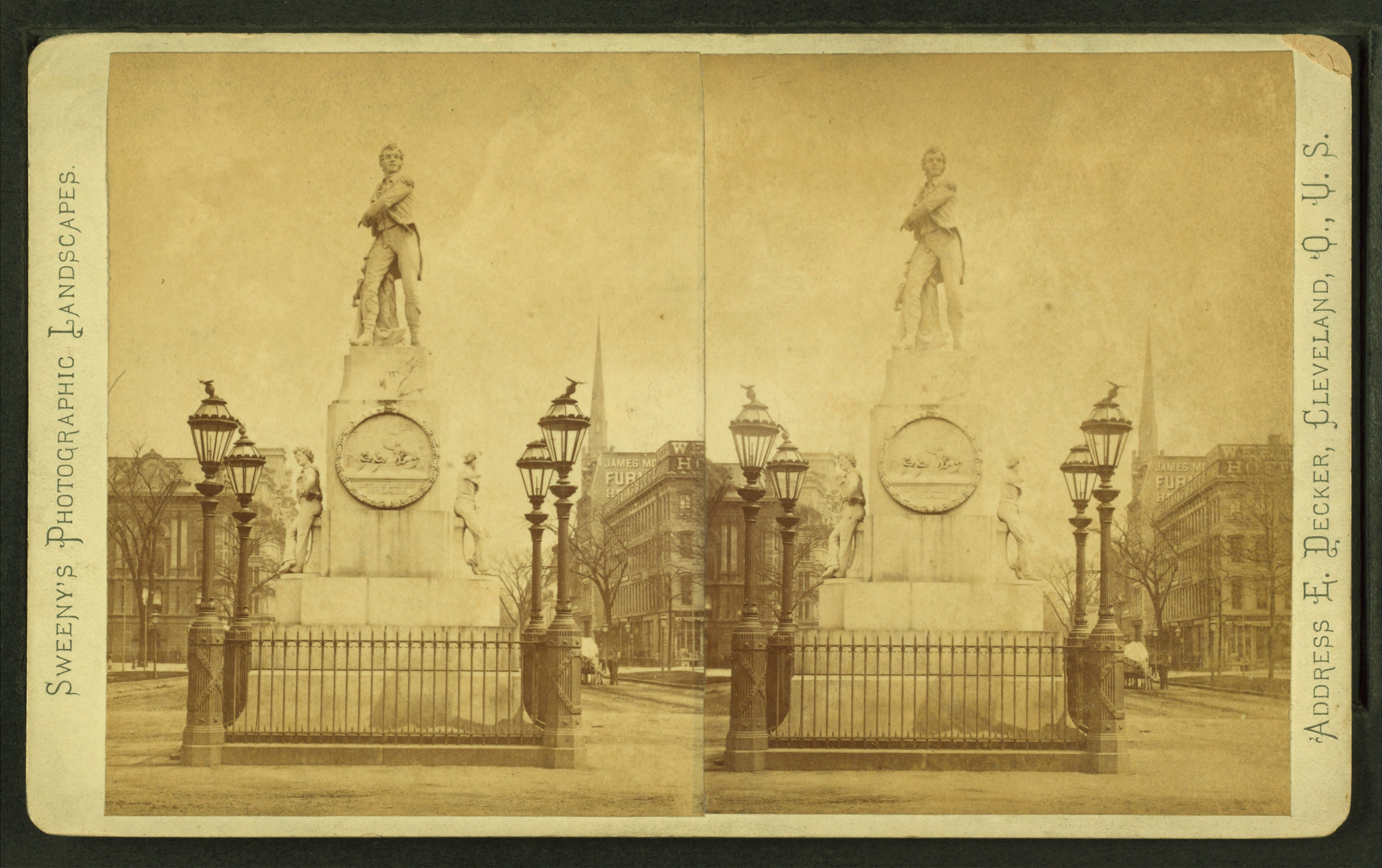
Stereo card of the monument in its original location, Cleveland's Public Square, c. 1870s

Walcutt's marble Perry statue was completed and installed for the dedication, as was the marble bas-relief on the pedestal. The two subsidiary figures intended to flank the pedestal – a midshipman and a sailor boy – were completed in plaster by 1860, but required additional funds to be carved in marble. They were completed and installed in 1869.

Over the years, the three marble statues and the marble bas-relief panel suffered damage from the weather. Cleveland's Early Settlers Association raised $10,000 to replace the sculptures. In 1929, they were removed from the monument and replaced with bronze copies, created under the supervision of sculptor Herman Matzen. At the same time, a second bronze copy of the Perry statue was made for Rhode Island, and installed on the grounds of the Statehouse in Providence.

The three marble statues and the marble bas-relief panel were donated to Perrysburg, Ohio in 1929, and were installed in Hood Park, along the Maumee River, in 1937. In 1997, Perrysburg replaced the marble statues with bronze copies, and installed the bronzes on a pedestal and base that approximated Walcutt's original positioning of the figures. The marble sailor statues are currently exhibited in the town's municipal building. The marble Perry statue has been on long-term loan to the National Park Service since 2002, and is exhibited in the visitor center at Perry's Victory and International Peace Memorial in the village of Put-in-Bay, Ohio on South Bass Island.

A plaster version of the Perry statue, presumed to be Walcutt's full-sized model used to carve the 1860 marble version, is in the collection of the Western Reserve Historical Society in Cleveland.

Walcutt's Perry statue is depicted on the reverse of the 2013 "Perry's Victory" quarter.

1859 chromolithograph depicting the proposed monument. Note that the scale, statue, and pedestal differ from Walcutt's design.

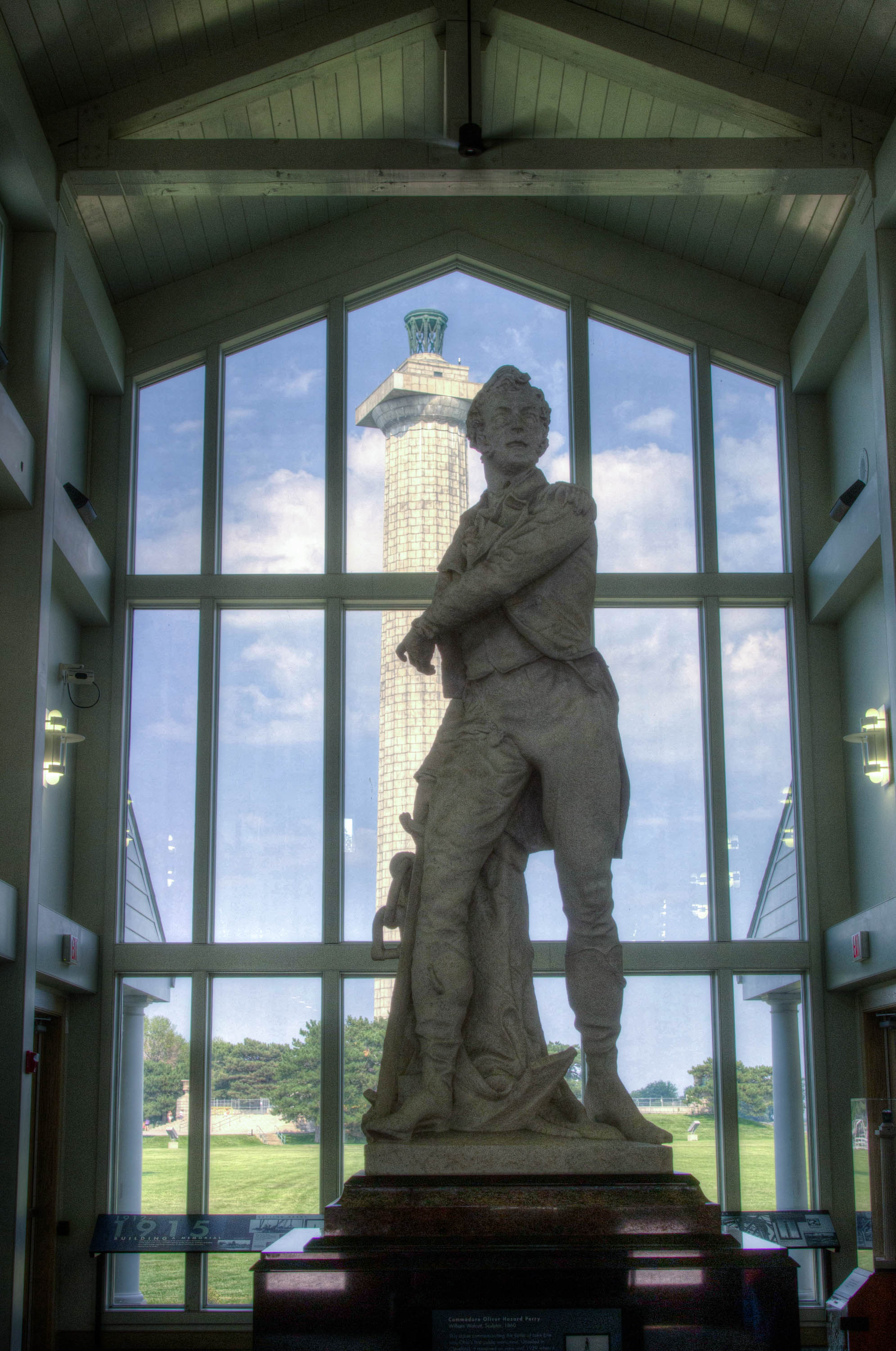
Perry Statue (marble, 1860), on display at the Perry's Victory and International Peace Memorial. Put-in-Bay, Ohio on South Bass Island.

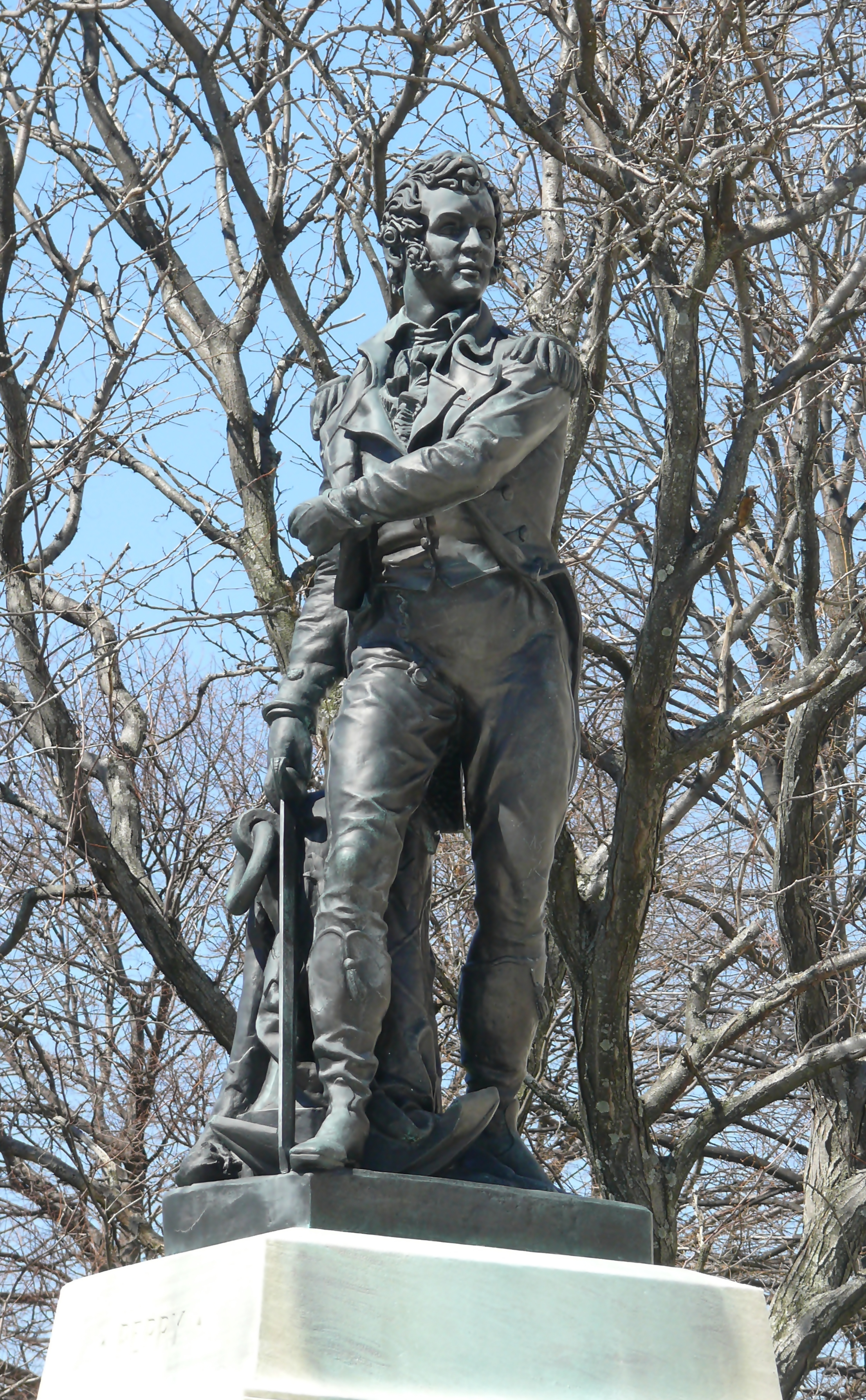
Perry Statue (bronze, cast 1928), Rhode Island State House. Providence, Rhode Island.

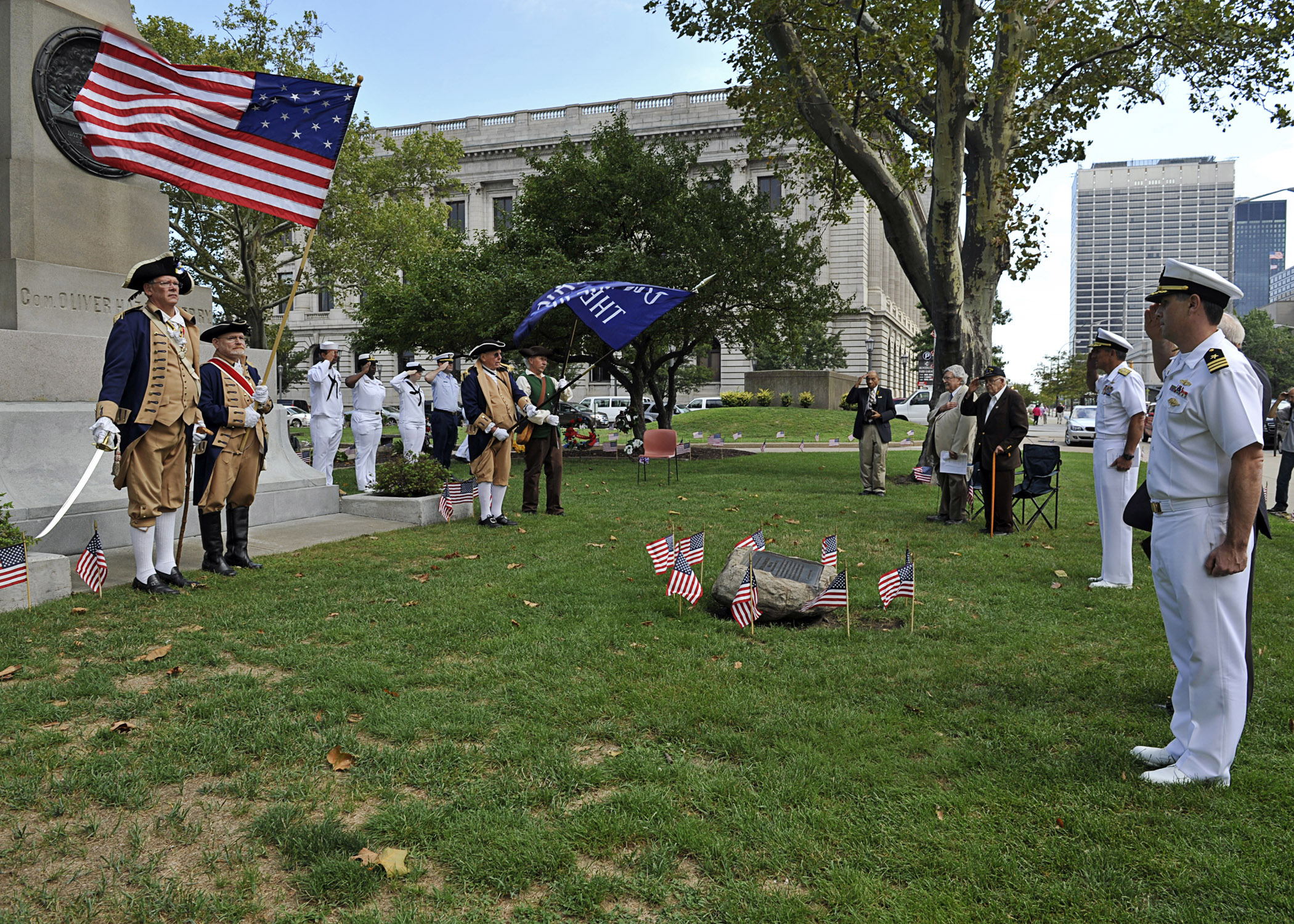
2012 ceremony at the Perry Monument commemorating the Bicentennial of the War of 1812. Cleveland, Ohio.
