= McReynolds House (Elkton, Kentucky) =

- U.S. National Register of Historic Places
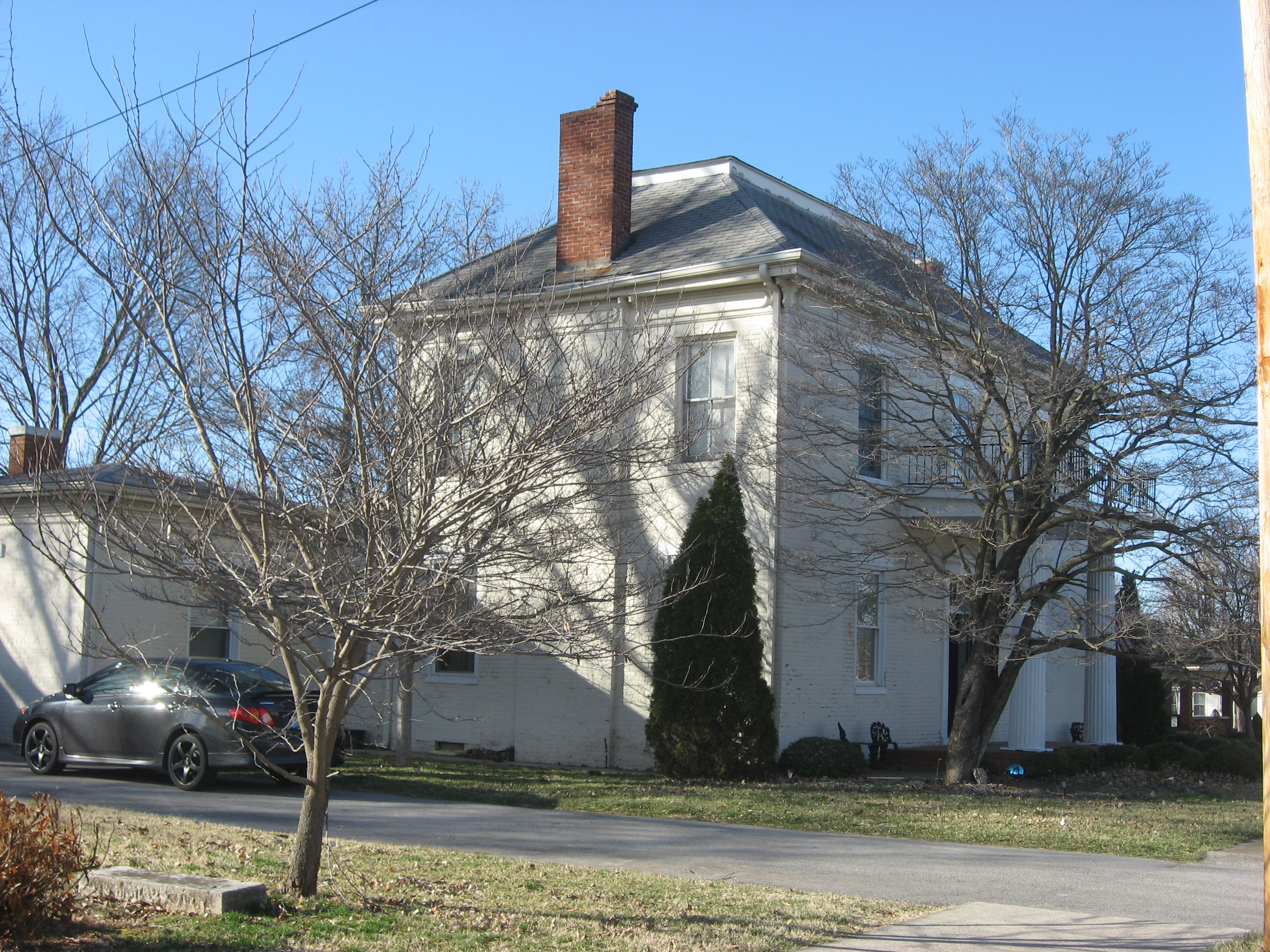

- Location within Kentucky
- Location: S. Main St., Elkton, Kentucky
- Coordinates: 36°48′25″N 87°09′18″W
- Area: 1 acre (0.40 ha)
- Built: c.1860
- NRHP reference No.: 76000946
- Added to NRHP: October 22, 1976

The McReynolds House, on S. Main St. in Elkton, Kentucky, was built around 1860. It was listed on the National Register of Historic Places in 1976.

It is a two-story three-bay brick house with a high hipped roof surmounted by a flat deck.

It is located two blocks south of the Todd County Courthouse in the center of the public square of Elkton.
