= Jefferson Davis State Historic Site =

- Jefferson Davis Monument
- U.S. National Register of Historic Places
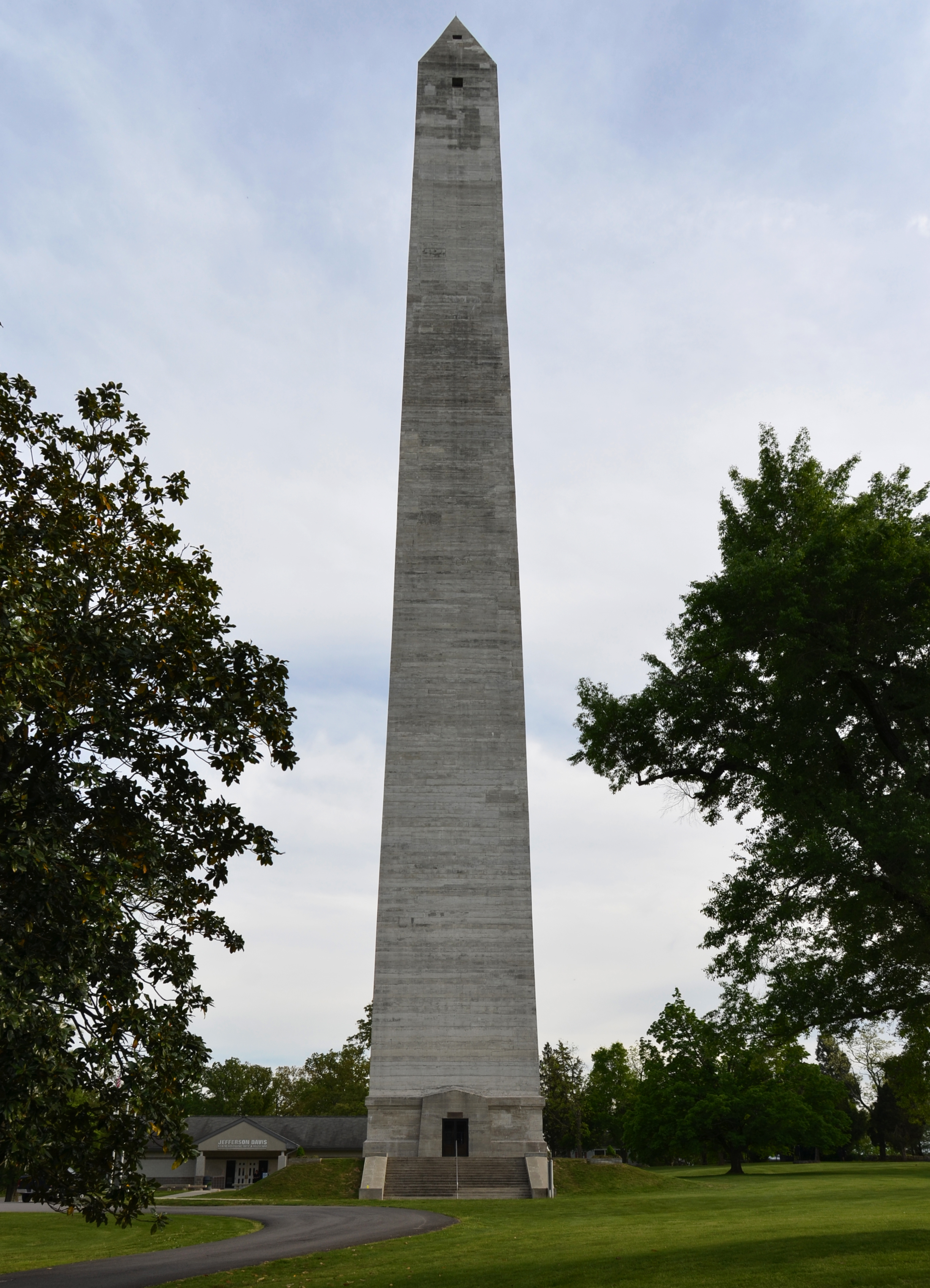
- Northern View

- Location within Kentucky Location within the United States
- Location: Fairview, Kentucky
- Coordinates: 36°50′31″N 87°18′2″W
- Built: 1917–1924
- Architects: S.F. Crecelius, Sr. Engineer; G.R. Gregg, Contractor
- Website: parks.ky.gov/fairview/parks/historic/jefferson-davis-state-historic-site
- NRHP reference No.: 73000849
- Added to NRHP: May 9, 1973

The Jefferson Davis Monument State Historic Site is a Kentucky state park commemorating the birthplace of Jefferson Davis, the president of the Confederate States of America, in Fairview, Kentucky. The site's focal point is a 351-foot (107.0 m) concrete obelisk. In 1973, it was believed to be the fourth-tallest monument in the United States and the tallest concrete-cast one.

== History of the monument ==
Simon Bolivar Buckner, Sr., a Confederate general, first proposed the idea of a monument for Davis during a reunion of the Orphan Brigade of the Confederate Army in 1907. Construction began in 1917 but stopped in 1918 at a height of 175 feet (53 m) due to building material rationing during World War I. Construction resumed in January 1922 and was finished in 1924 at a cost of $200,000. The monument's base was set on limestone bedrock and limestone was quarried on the site for use in its construction. The concrete walls are 8.5 feet (2.6 m) thick at the base and taper to 2.5 feet (0.76 m) thick at the top. The monument was listed in the National Register of Historic Places in 1973. The obelisk was closed to the public from 1999 until May 2004 for renovations and construction of a new visitor center. At the top of the monument is an observation room with a window in each of the four walls. Originally, this room could only be reached by climbing stairs which went around the interior of the monument; an elevator, installed in 1929, now takes visitors to and from the observation room.

== Park details ==
The Jefferson Davis State Historic Site is one of eleven historic sites in Kentucky which include small parks and are maintained by the Kentucky Department of Parks. The park covers 19 acres (7.7 ha) and includes open and covered picnic areas and a playground.

At the visitors' center museum, visitors can watch a video describing Davis' life and the construction of the monument. Guided elevator tours of the monument are available daily.

The center sells books and memorabilia about Davis, the American Civil War, and the surrounding area, as well as Kentucky handcrafts. The park is open from May 1 until October 31.

== Monument size ==
The monument is the tallest unreinforced concrete structure in the world. No steel was used to reinforce the concrete walls below its pyramidal top. As one pour was completed, large chunks of limestone were left projecting up to connect it to the next pour above. It is also the tallest concrete obelisk in the world.

It is the fifth tallest monument in the United States, behind the Gateway Arch at 630 feet (190 m), the San Jacinto Monument at 567 feet (173 m), the Washington Monument at 555 feet (169 m), and the Perry's Victory and International Peace Memorial at 352 feet (107 m). The Crazy Horse Memorial, not yet completed, has a planned height of 563 feet (172 m). Elsewhere in the world, the Great Pyramid of Giza, Khafre's Pyramid, Spring Temple Buddha, and Ushiku Daibutsu are taller monuments.

== Gallery ==
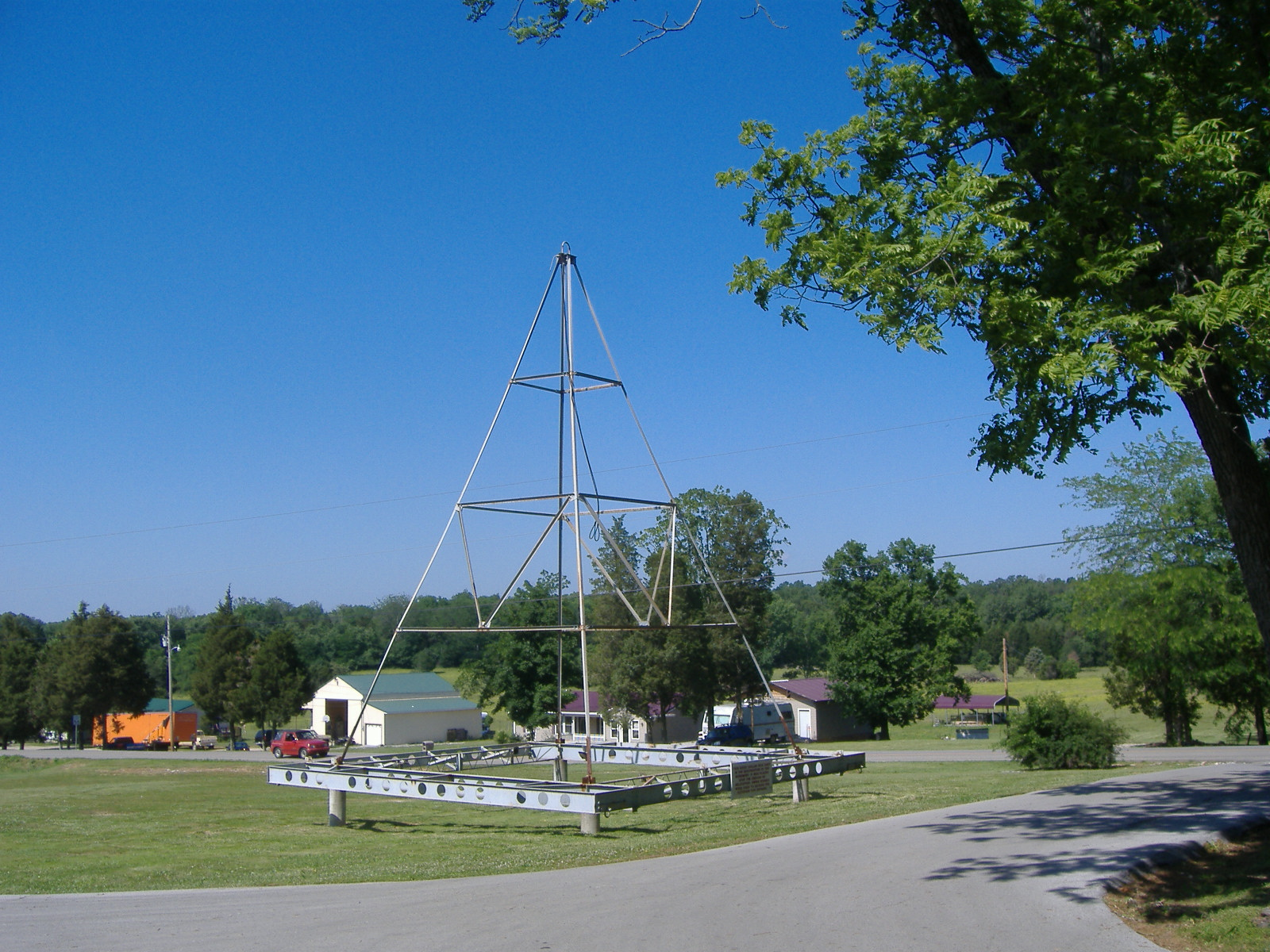
Steel frame used to suspend maintenance rigging from the top of the monument

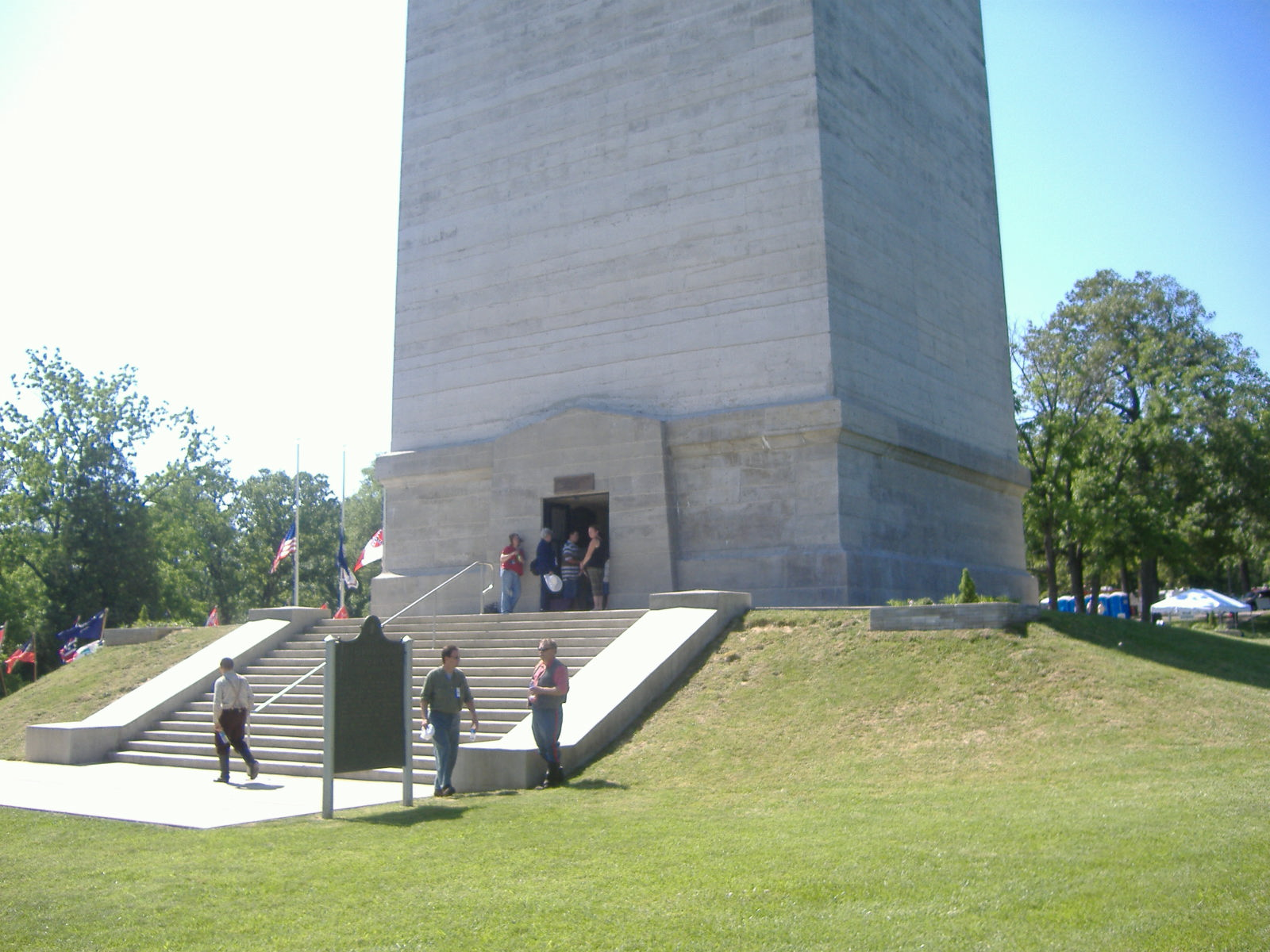
Entrance to the monument

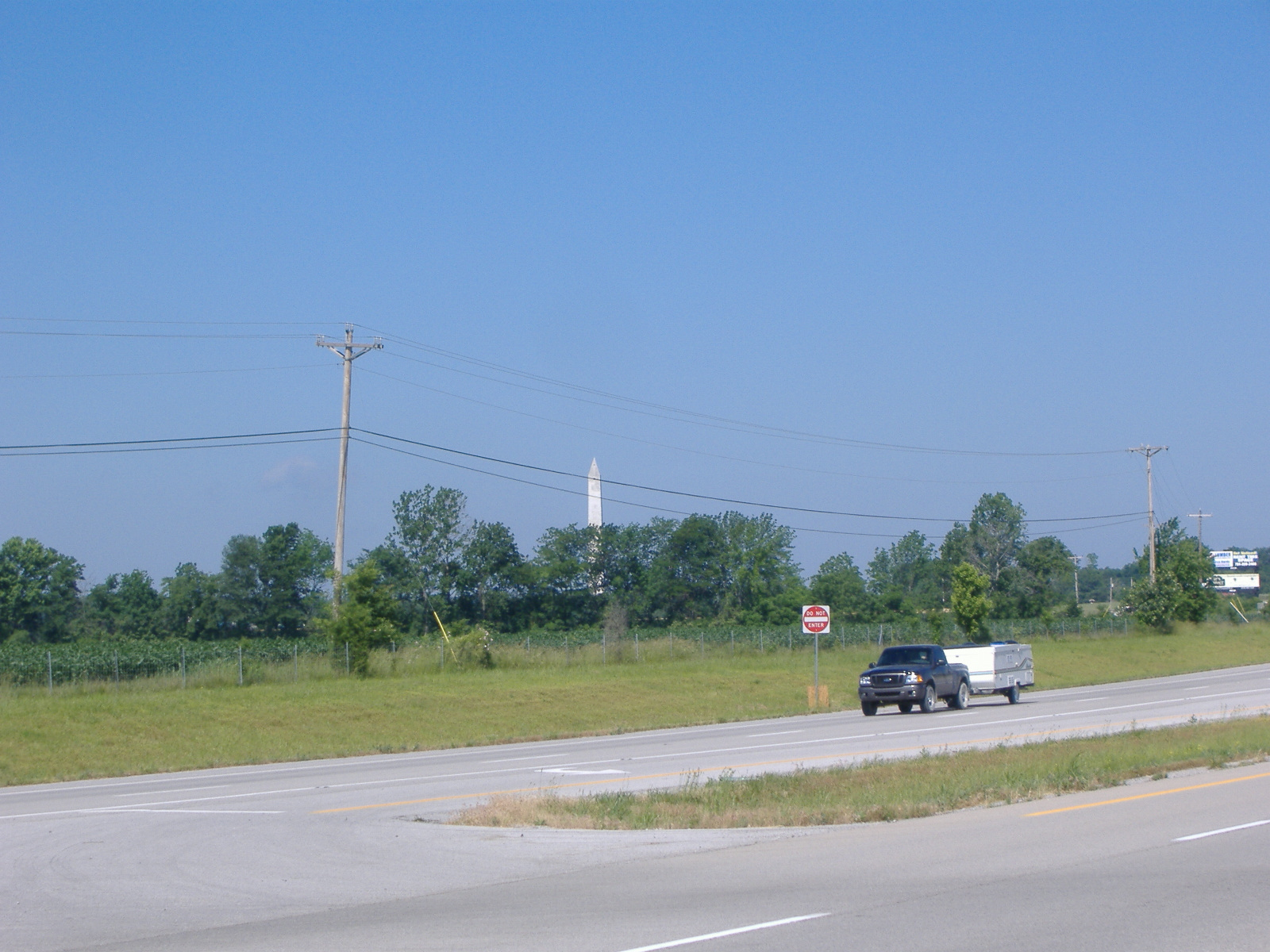
Distant view of the monument

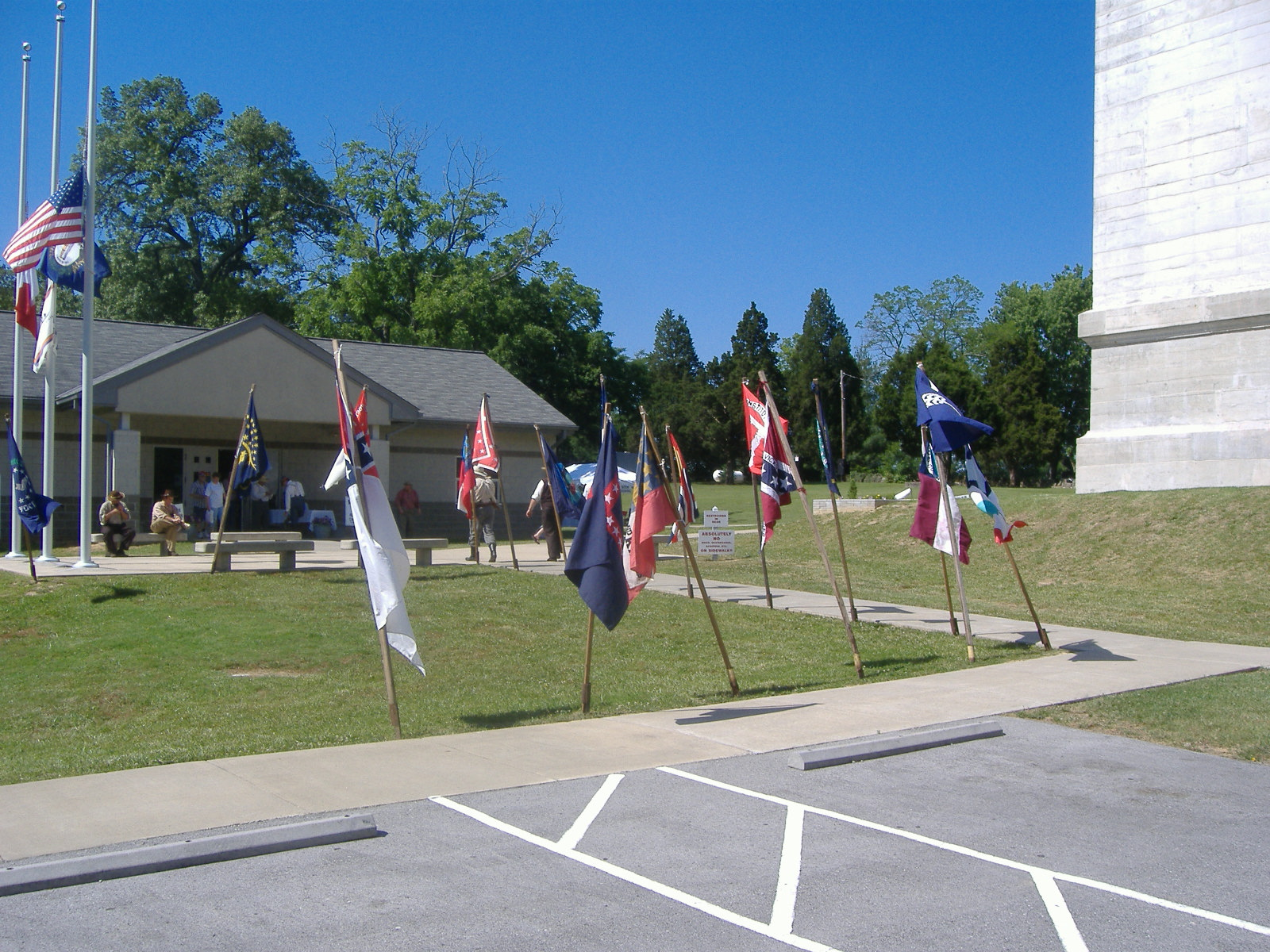
Confederate flags displayed by monument

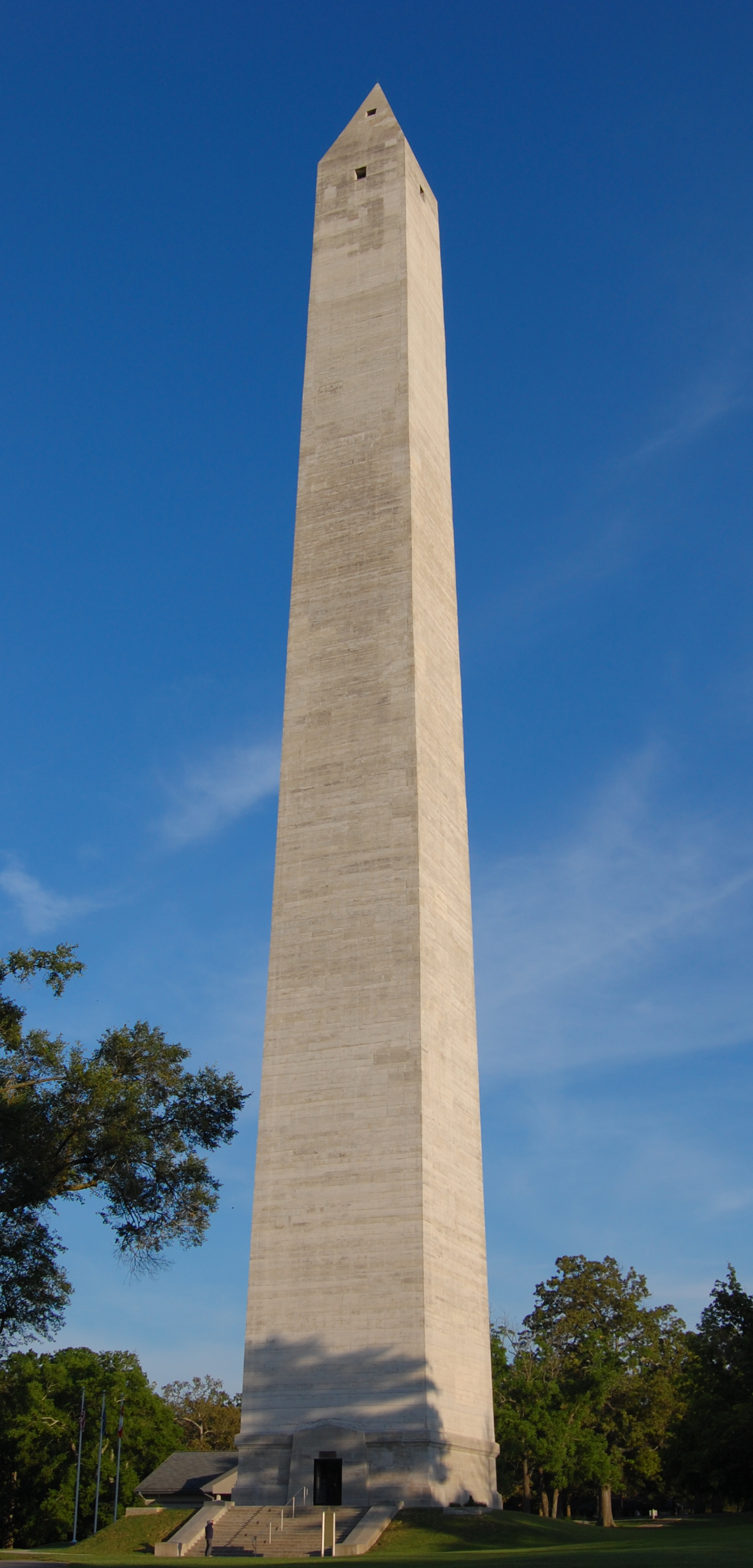
Jefferson Davis Memorial

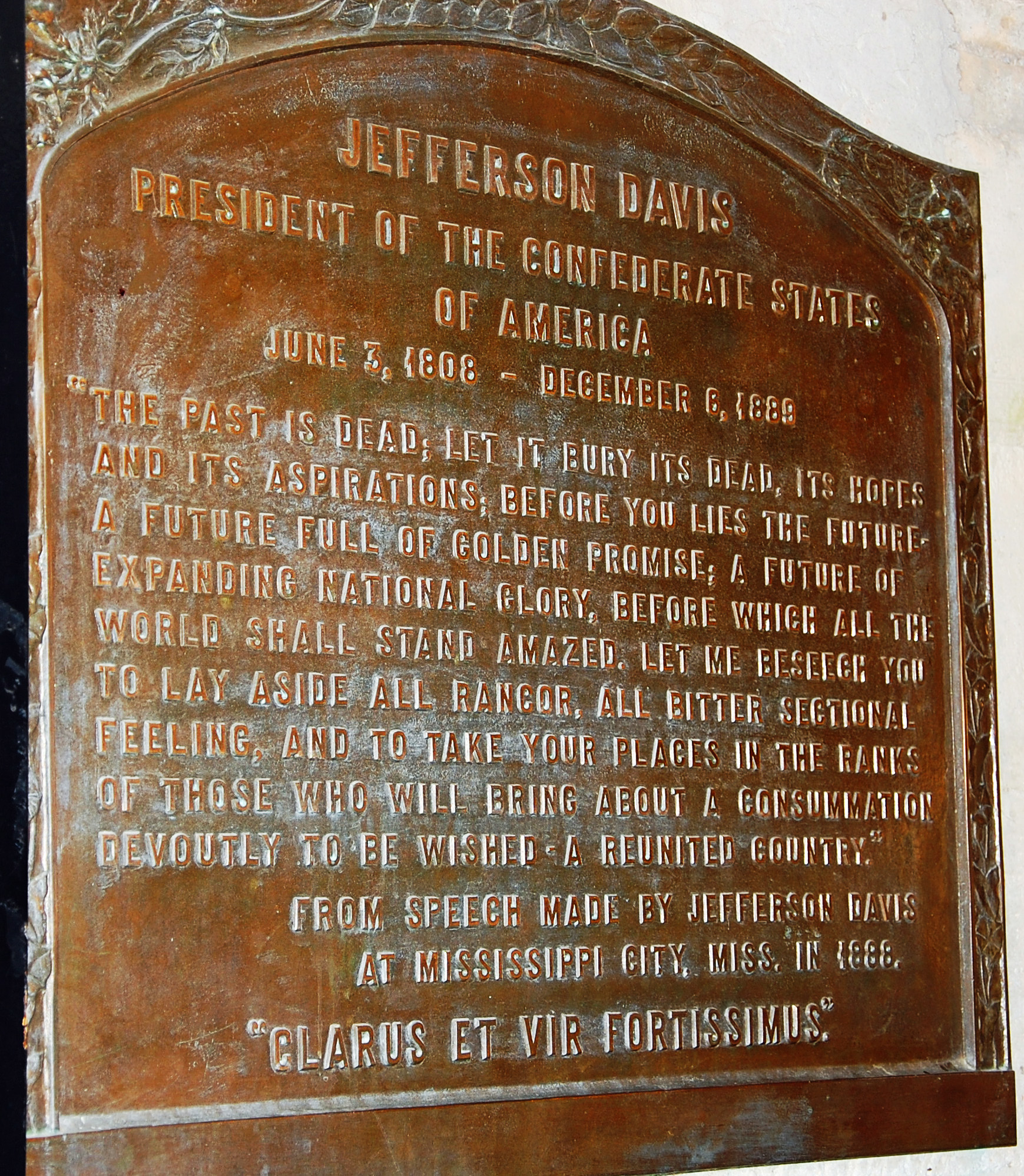
Plaque with a quote

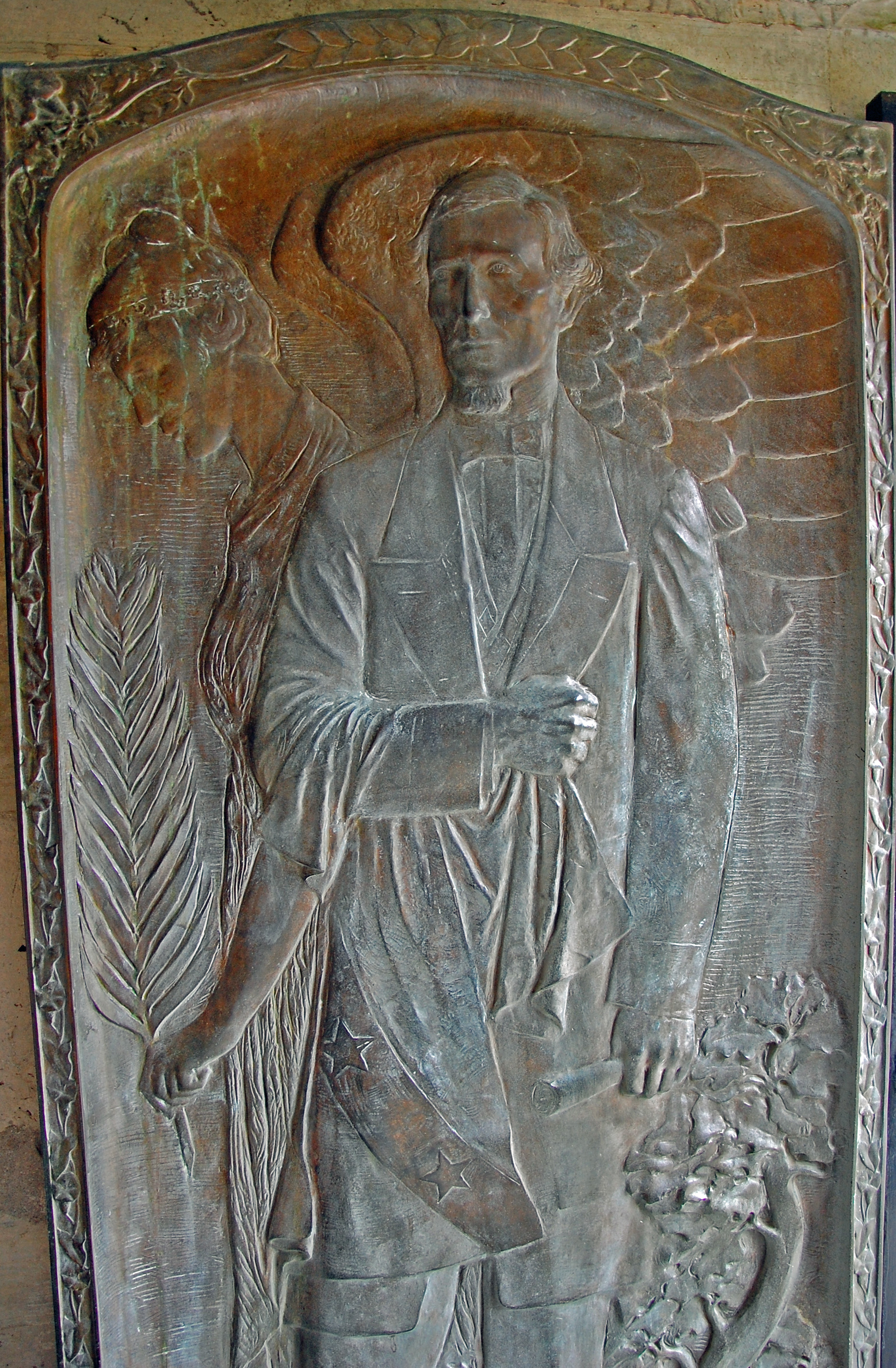
Bas relief of Jefferson Davis

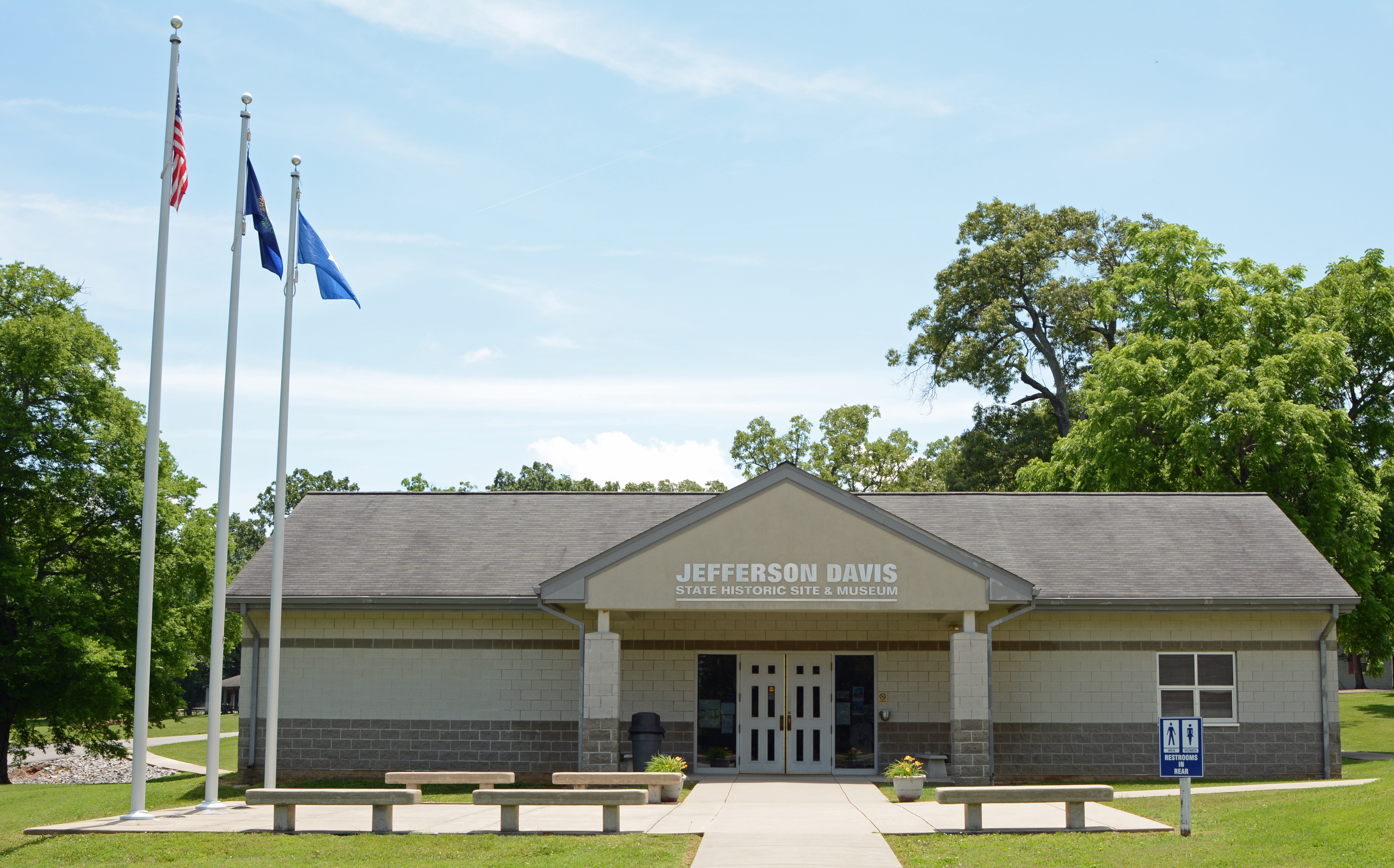
Museum

== See also ==
- List of memorials to Jefferson Davis
- List of tallest towers in the world
