= Allensville Historic District =

Historic district in Kentucky, United States

- U.S. National Register of Historic Places
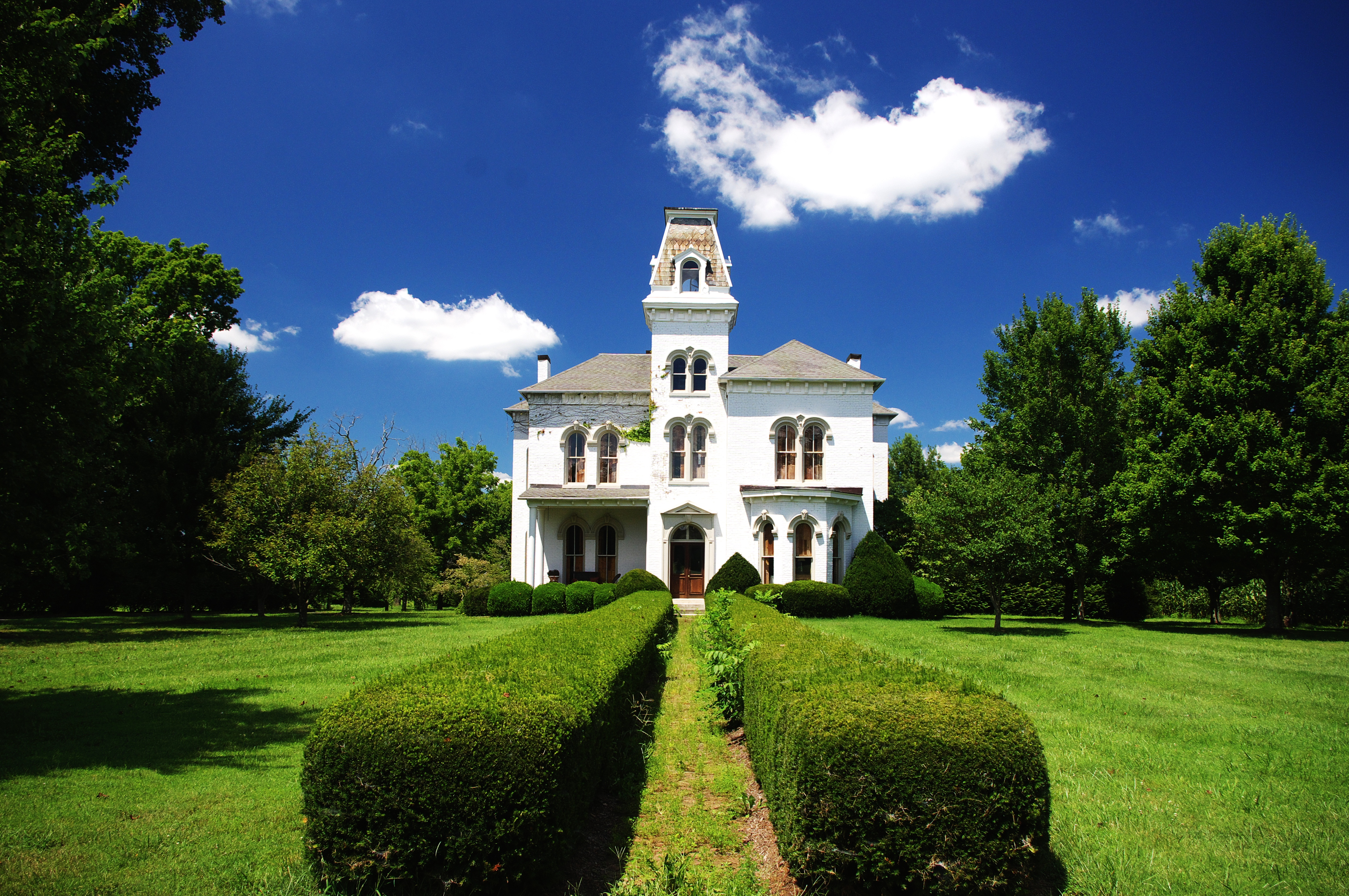

- Location within Kentucky Location within the United States
- Location: KY 102/Main St., Allensville, Kentucky
- Coordinates: 36°42′58″N 87°04′06″W
- Area: 18 acres (7.3 ha)
- Built: 1860
- Built by: Billy King
- Architectural style: Queen Anne, Italian Villa, Folk Victorian, Commercial
- NRHP reference No.: 88002611
- Added to NRHP: November 14, 1988

The Allensville Historic District, along Kentucky Route 102/Main St. in Allensville, Kentucky, is a 18 acres (7.3 ha) historic district which was listed on the National Register of Historic Places in 1988. The listing included 40 contributing buildings and one contributing structure.

It includes three churches, of which Allensville United Methodist Church (1867) is the oldest. It may also be the oldest surviving building in Allensville.
