= Bethel Baptist Church (Fairview, Kentucky) =

Historic church in Kentucky, United States

- U.S. National Register of Historic Places
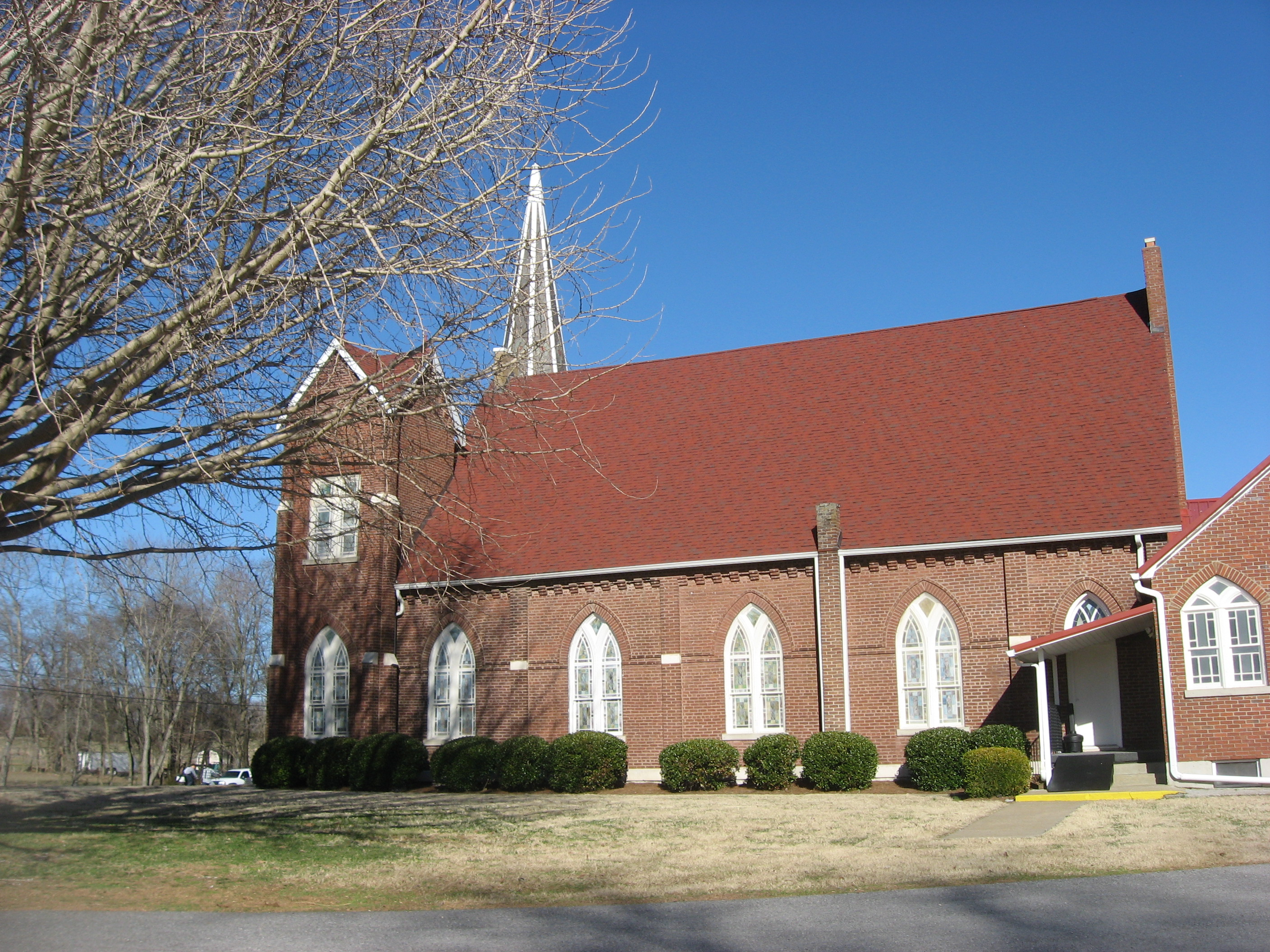
- Western side

- Location within Kentucky Location within the United States
- Location: Fairview, Kentucky
- Coordinates: 36°50′37″N 87°17′55″W
- Area: 1 acre (0.40 ha)
- Built: 1901
- Architectural style: Gothic, High Victorian Gothic
- NRHP reference No.: 77000651
- Added to NRHP: November 17, 1977

Bethel Baptist Church is a historic Southern Baptist church near U.S. Route 68 in Fairview, Kentucky. It occupies the site where Jefferson Davis, President of the Confederate States of America, was born in 1808. The current structure was built in 1901 and was added to the National Register of Historic Places in 1977.

== History ==
The congregation first formed on January 22, 1814, when fourteen members of West Fork Baptist Church branched off to form a new church. It was officially organized on March 22, 1816, with the first church located near Salubria Springs in Christian County. In 1823 the church relocated to a new site between the communities of Fairview and Pembroke.

By 1884 the church had outgrown its building, and members decided to split into two churches for Fairview and Pembroke. After 70 Pembroke members formed their own church on July 3, 1884, the remaining congregants determined to buy the old Davis family property, where President of the Confederate States of America Jefferson Davis had been born in 1808. Consulting with Davis, ten Fairview trustees purchased the property and ceremonially deeded it to him. Per the agreement, Davis in turn donated the lot to Bethel Baptist Church on March 10, 1886. The former Davis homestead was demolished and replaced with a new Gothic Revival church; Davis attended the dedication in fall 1886.

The church was struck by lightning and burned down on August 23, 1900. The current building was erected on the same site; it was dedicated on September 29, 1901. It followed a similar Gothic Revival design as the original, being constructed of various materials and including ornate detailing and a complex roof line. The most notable difference was the addition of a rear wing. Bethel Baptist Church was added to the National Register of Historic Places on November 17, 1977.
