= Elkton Commercial Historic District =

- U.S. National Register of Historic Places
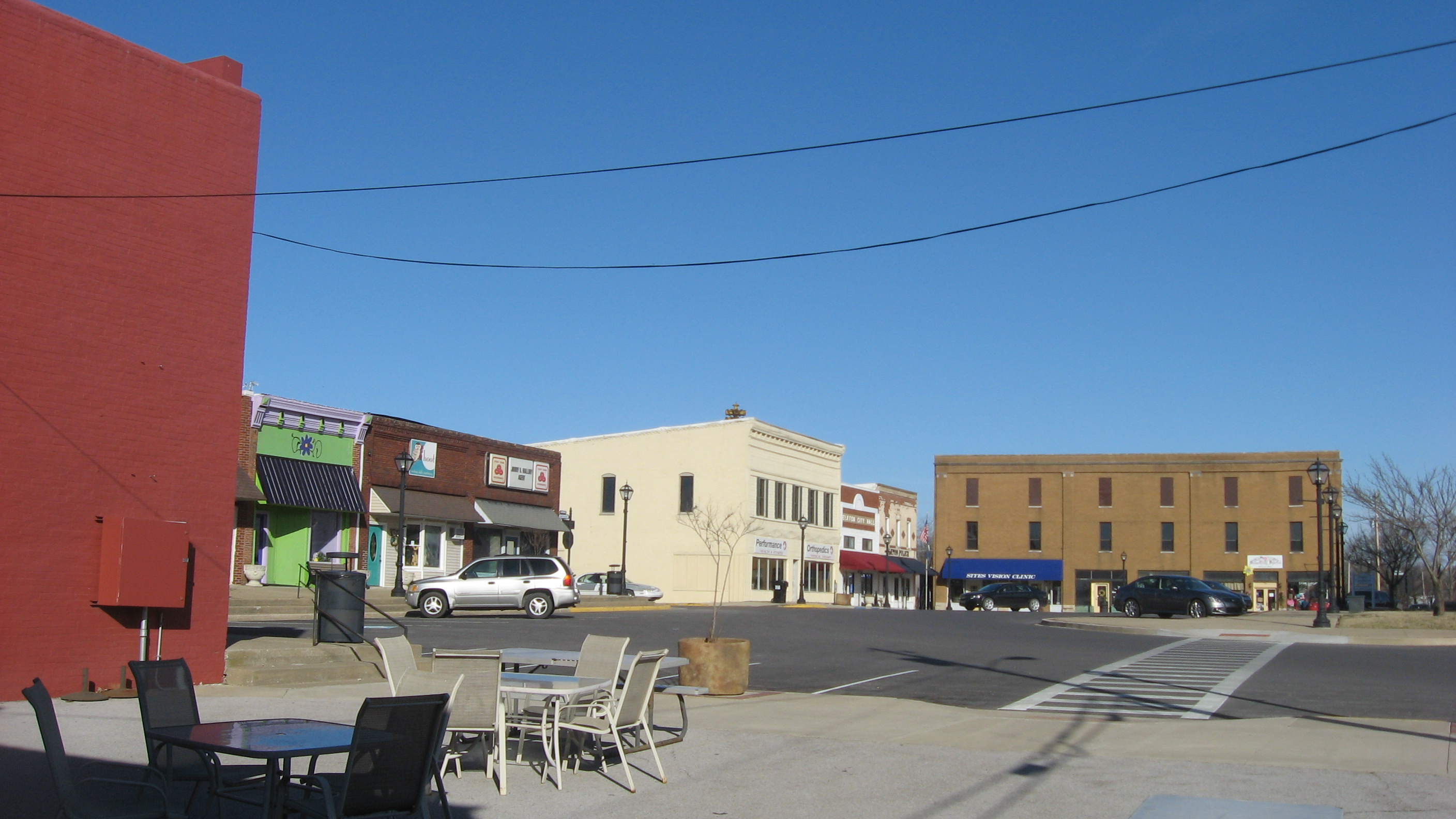

- Location within Kentucky Location within the United States
- Location: Jct. of N., S., E., and W. Main Sts., Elkton, Kentucky
- Coordinates: 36°48′34″N 87°09′15″W
- Area: 2.8 acres (1.1 ha)
- Built: 1821
- Built by: Russell, Jesse
- Architectural style: Colonial Revival, Italianate, Federal
- NRHP reference No.: 89001976
- Added to NRHP: November 13, 1989

The Elkton Commercial Historic District, in Elkton, Kentucky, is a 2.8 acres (1.1 ha) historic district which was listed on the National Register of Historic Places in 1989.

It included 18 contributing buildings around the public square of Elkton, intersected by N., S., E., and W. Main Streets. The buildings are "primarily one-to-two-story masonry structures with detailing and designs reflecting local interpretations of the Italianate and Colonial Revival commercial forms of the period. While the majority of the commercial buildings have altered storefronts, most retain original upper facade detailing. The public square is the commercial center of Elkton and Todd County."

These include:

- Todd County Courthouse (1835), in the center of the square, built by local brickmason Jesse Russell. This was already separately listed on the National Register.
- 13 Public Square (c.1895), a one-story, eight-bay, brick and stone commercial building with twin storefronts having no original details.
