= Fairview, Kentucky =

Census-designated place in Kentucky, United States

- Census-designated place
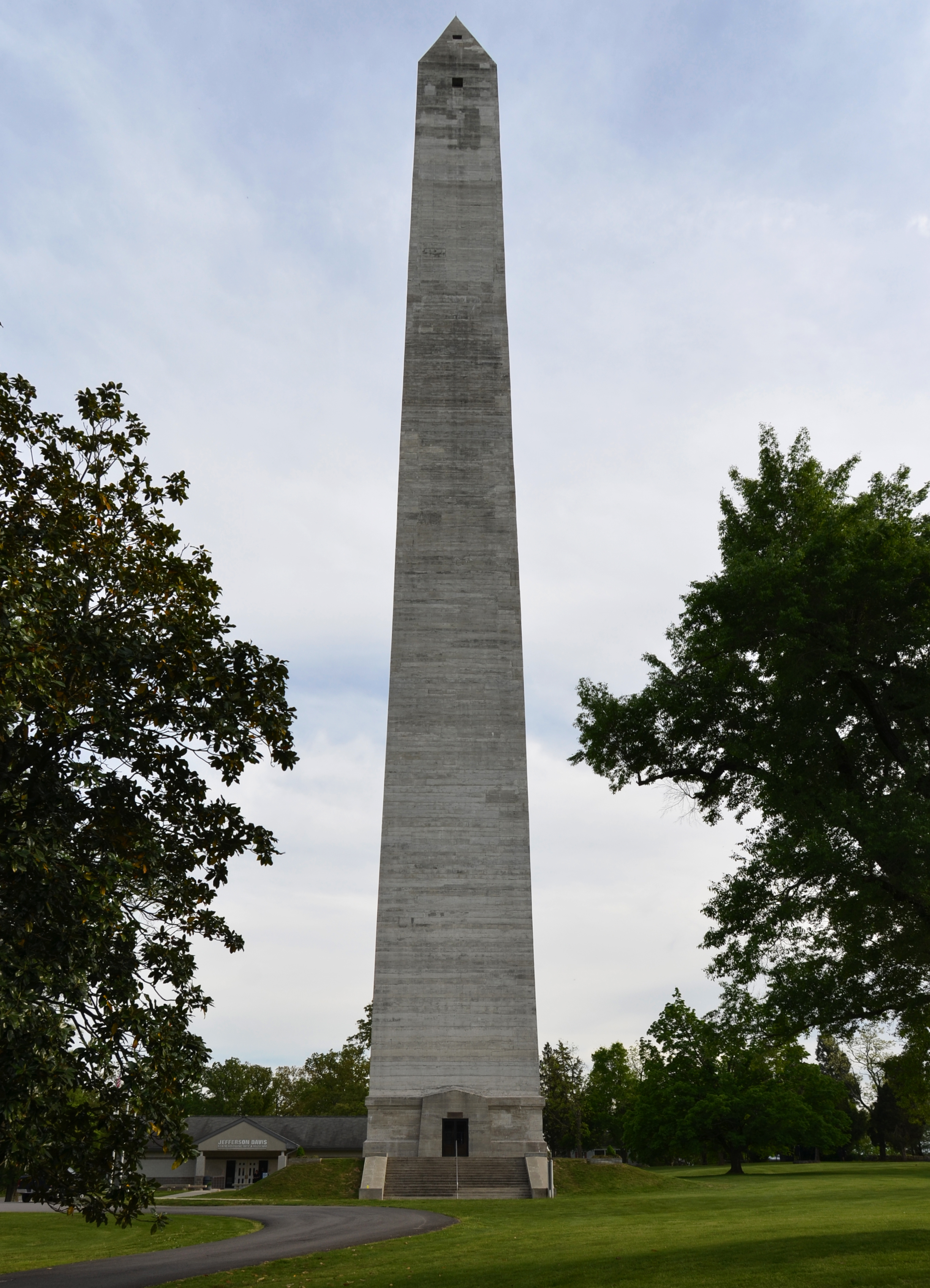
- Jefferson Davis Monument in Fairview

- Location within Kentucky
- Coordinates: 36°50′36″N 87°18′14″W
- Country: United States
- State: Kentucky
- County: Christian

Area
  - Total: 1.21 sq mi (3.13 km^{2})
  - Land: 1.21 sq mi (3.13 km^{2})
  - Water: 0 sq mi (0.00 km^{2})
- Elevation: 640 ft (195 m)

Population (2020)
  - Total: 258
  - Density: 213.8/sq mi (82.54/km^{2})
- ZIP code: 42266
- GNIS feature ID: 0491893

Fairview is a small census-designated place on the boundary between Christian and Todd counties in the western part of the U.S. state of Kentucky. As of the 2020 census, the population was 258, down from the 2010 census total of 286, with 186 living in Christian County and 100 living in Todd County. It is chiefly notable as the birthplace of Jefferson Davis, later President of the Confederate States of America, and as the location of the Jefferson Davis State Historic Site.

== History ==
The community was likely first established by Samuel Davis, a Revolutionary War veteran who settled on the Todd County side around 1793. Davis opened the first post office there on October 1, 1802, naming the locale "Davisburg." His son, Jefferson Davis, the future President of the Confederate States of America, was born here on June 3, 1808.

The Davis family remained in the area until 1810, when they relocated to the Bayou Teche in St. Mary Parish, Louisiana. The community was later known as "Georgetown" after local tavern keeper George Nichols. The town was incorporated as "Fairview" on February 6, 1846; the Fairview Post Office opened on the Christian County side on June 8. The post office moved back and forth between Christian and Todd counties over the years; in the early 1980s it was located on the Christian County side.

In the 1880s ten Fairview locals purchased the old Davis property as a new home for Bethel Baptist Church. Working with Jefferson Davis, the buyers ceremonially deeded the lot to him, and he in turn donated it to Bethel Baptist Church on March 10, 1886. The old Davis homestead was demolished and replaced with a new Gothic Revival church. This burned down in 1900, and the present building was erected on the site the following year.

In 1917, construction of the Jefferson Davis State Historic Site began. It was completed in 1924.

== Geography ==
Fairview is located along U.S. Route 68 / Kentucky Route 80, about 10 miles (16 km) east of Hopkinsville and 9 miles (14 km) west of Elkton. The original route of U.S. 68 passed through the town; the new route passes less than 0.25 miles (0.40 km) north of the town, and the original route is now called Jefferson Davis Road. The community is part of the Clarksville, TN–KY Metropolitan Statistical Area.

== Demographics ==
Historical population
| Census | Pop. | Note | %± |
|---|---|---|---|
| 2010 | 286 | | — |
| 2020 | 258 | | −9.8% |
U.S. Decennial Census

== Education ==
Portions in Christian County are in the Christian County School District.

Portions in Todd County are in the Todd County School District.
