= Robert Penn Warren Museum =

Robert Penn Warren Birthplace Museum
- Location within Kentucky Location within the United States
- Established: June 1989
- Location: Guthrie, Kentucky
- Coordinates: 36.6479419°N 87.1670365°W
- Type: Biographical museum
- Website: www.robertpennwarren.com/birthpla.html

The Robert Penn Warren Museum is a museum in Guthrie, Kentucky, showcasing the birthplace of American poet Robert Penn Warren.
