= Guthrie Historic District (Guthrie, Kentucky) =

Historic district in Kentucky, United States

- U.S. National Register of Historic Places
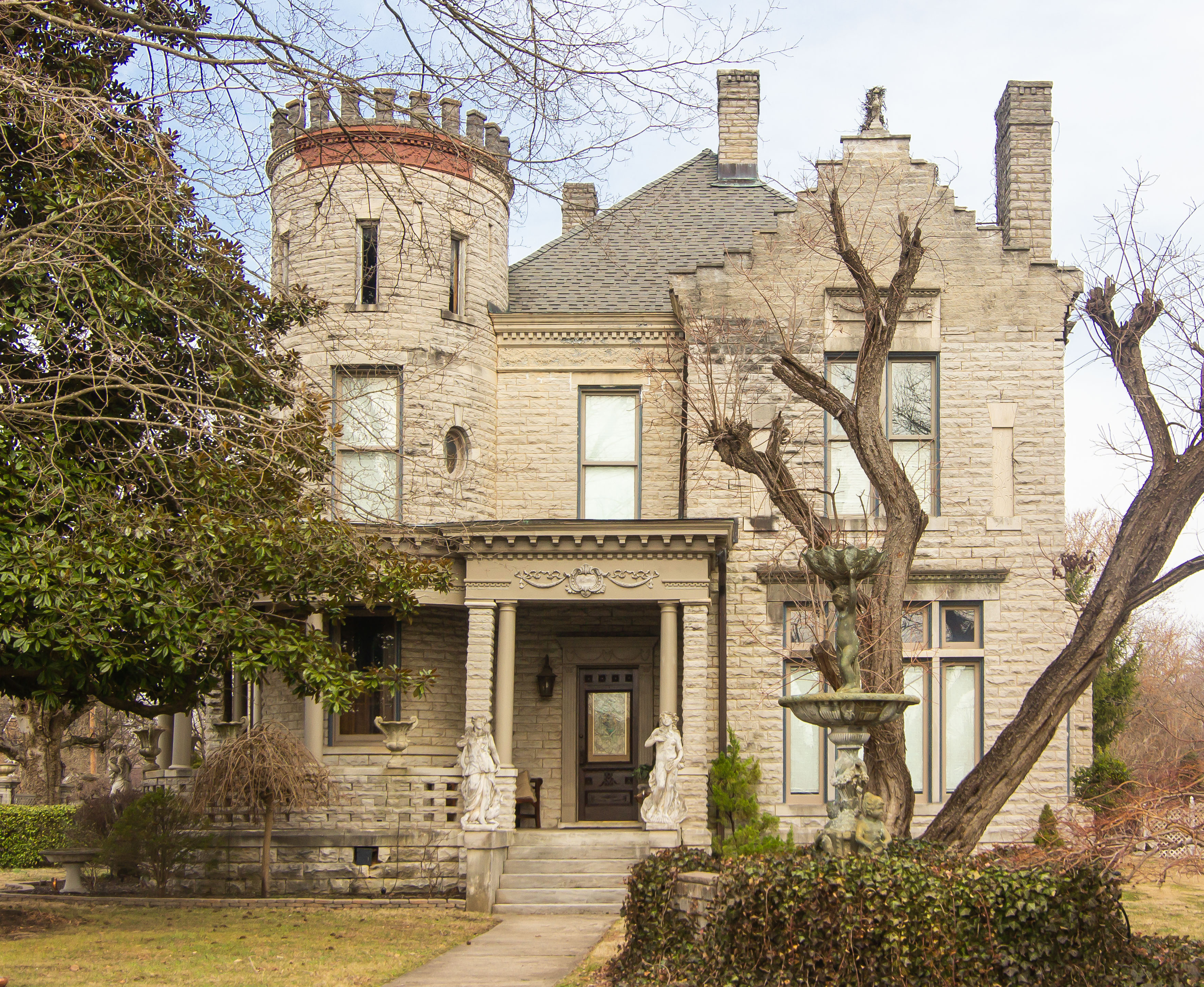
- 1898-built stone house in the district

- Location within Kentucky
- Location: Roughly bounded by Ewing, Park & Cherry Sts., Guthrie, Kentucky
- Coordinates: 36.6484°N 87.1664°W
- Area: 12.9 acres (5.2 ha)
- Built: 1879-1967
- NRHP reference No.: 11000801
- Added to NRHP: November 10, 2011

The Guthrie Historic District in Guthrie, Kentucky was listed on the National Register of Historic Places in 2011. It is a 12.3 acres (5.0 ha) area deemed significant "for its connection with the L&N railroad and its associations with transportation in that area. It included 25 contributing buildings, one contributing structure, and two contributing sites, as well as three non-contributing buildings and six noncontributing sites.

Guthrie was founded as a city in 1879, and railroad service was important to the city. Commercial service continues, but passenger railroad service ended in 1957.

Buildings in the district include:

- Stone House (1898), 106 N. Ewing, a castle-like mansion
- Rose House (1820), 112 E. Park, adjacent to Stone House, another large house
- Robert Penn Warren Museum, a home of author Robert Penn Warren
- Three buildings which, in 2011, were planned to become a railroad museum. In 2022, a railroad museum including a caboose is open by appointment.
- Abshire Building (1896), 238 S. Ewing St., a brick building which was once three stories tall, and was a salon and gambling establishment. After a fire destroyed its upper floors in 1899 and Guthrie voting itself "dry", it was renovated into a one-story building. Its original concrete nameplate of the building, at the top of third floor, was reinstalled above its one story.
