= Old Todd County Courthouse =

- Todd County Courthouse
- U.S. National Register of Historic Places
- U.S. Historic district – Contributing property
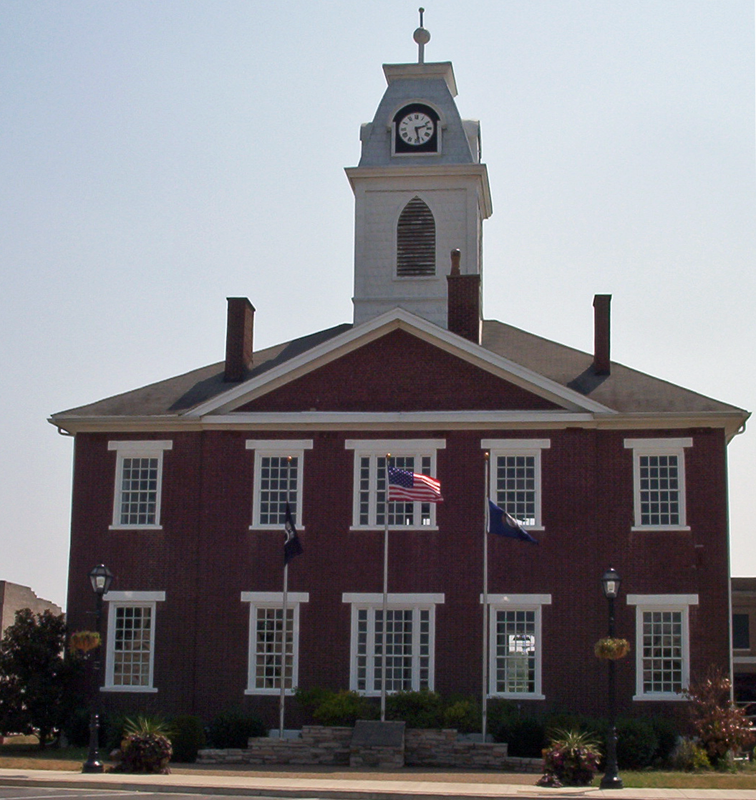

- Location within Kentucky Location within the United States
- Location: Elkton, Kentucky
- Coordinates: 36°48′34″N 87°9′15″W
- Built: 1835
- Architect: R. Rowland
- Architectural style: Federal
- Part of: Elkton Commercial Historic District (ID89001976)
- NRHP reference No.: 75000836

Significant dates
- Added to NRHP: August 22, 1975
- Designated CP: November 13, 1989

The Old Todd County Courthouse (c.1835) is the second courthouse to be constructed in Todd County, Kentucky The first court house building was constructed on the same site. Planning for the building began in 1834. Construction was begun in 1835 and the project was completed in 1836. Bricks used in the building's construction were fired on the site. The construction of the courthouse which occupies the center square in Elkton, was authorized by the Fiscal Court, Tuesday, November 11, 1834, at which time they arranged for the selection of a building site.

== History ==
The Commissioners further mandated the county to meet the cost in three payments, the first of which would come from unappropriated funds, which were being held by the sheriff. Thereafter, the balance would be remitted in two equal payments. The building was erected according to a plan drafted by "R. Rowland." The building contained two large open rooms; one on the first floor, and another on the second. The first floor room was used as a formal court room containing a judge's stand framed in a frontispiece and a railing separating the auditorium and bar. Small rooms concealed behind semi-circular shaped walls held jury deliberation spaces and judge's chambers. The semi-circular walls in both court rooms are similar to design features used in the courthouses and pattern books of architect Robert Mills. The second floor room, though also having small rooms located on the south-west and south-east corners, was used as a space for the Grand Jury, County Fiscal Court, and for community gatherings. Two large Doric columns that embody the architectural principles of entasis were placed in the lower court room to support the second floor. These columns are created of custom formed circular brick. The millwork details located in the building's judge's stand frontispiece are directly inspired by Asher Benjamin's Country Builder's Assistant pattern book. The building originally contained no county offices. The county instead constructed a county office annex known as the "Clerk's Office" located near the south-west corner of the Elkton town square in 1822.

The building's mason Jesse Russell, of Elkton, was employed to supervise the construction, along with Commissioner Hazel Petrie. There are two accounts of the building of the walls. Russell is said to have hired four brickmasons, each of whom was to construct a wall: the mason with the best wall was to receive a gold watch. In another account, Jesse Russell and another brick mason were said to have boasted on their masonry skills. To settle the dispute, each was told to build a wall. Each man bet upon himself and Russell's wall was superior.

In 1856, a new Clerk's Office was ordered to be constructed by the court. A new site was selected and a new clerk's office was erected by 1860, costing the county $2,000.

The court house was heavily used for various reasons, including for the boarding of soldiers, during the Civil War to the point of being unfit for the use of the court. County courts left the building to instead use the Masonic Lodge in Elkton. In 1871, the building was renovated using funds from the sale of the 1860 Clerk's Office. The renovation of the building called for the building to have only one court room and to incorporate the county Clerk's Offices. The courtroom was moved upstairs and the Clerk's Offices were established on the ground floor.

The clock tower was added during this time in the Victorian architectural style known as the Second Empire.

During another restoration project in 1975 the courthouse was designated as a National Historic Landmark. In 1961 city officials voted to paint all woodworking and the clock tower white for lack of funds. The tower was originally painted in multiple colors.

In the following years the court out-grew the courthouse and moved to a new location in southern Elkton. The courthouse currently stands in downtown Elkton and is county owned and leased to the City of Elkton.
