= Perry's Victory and International Peace Memorial =

Memorial in Put-in-Bay, Ohio, US

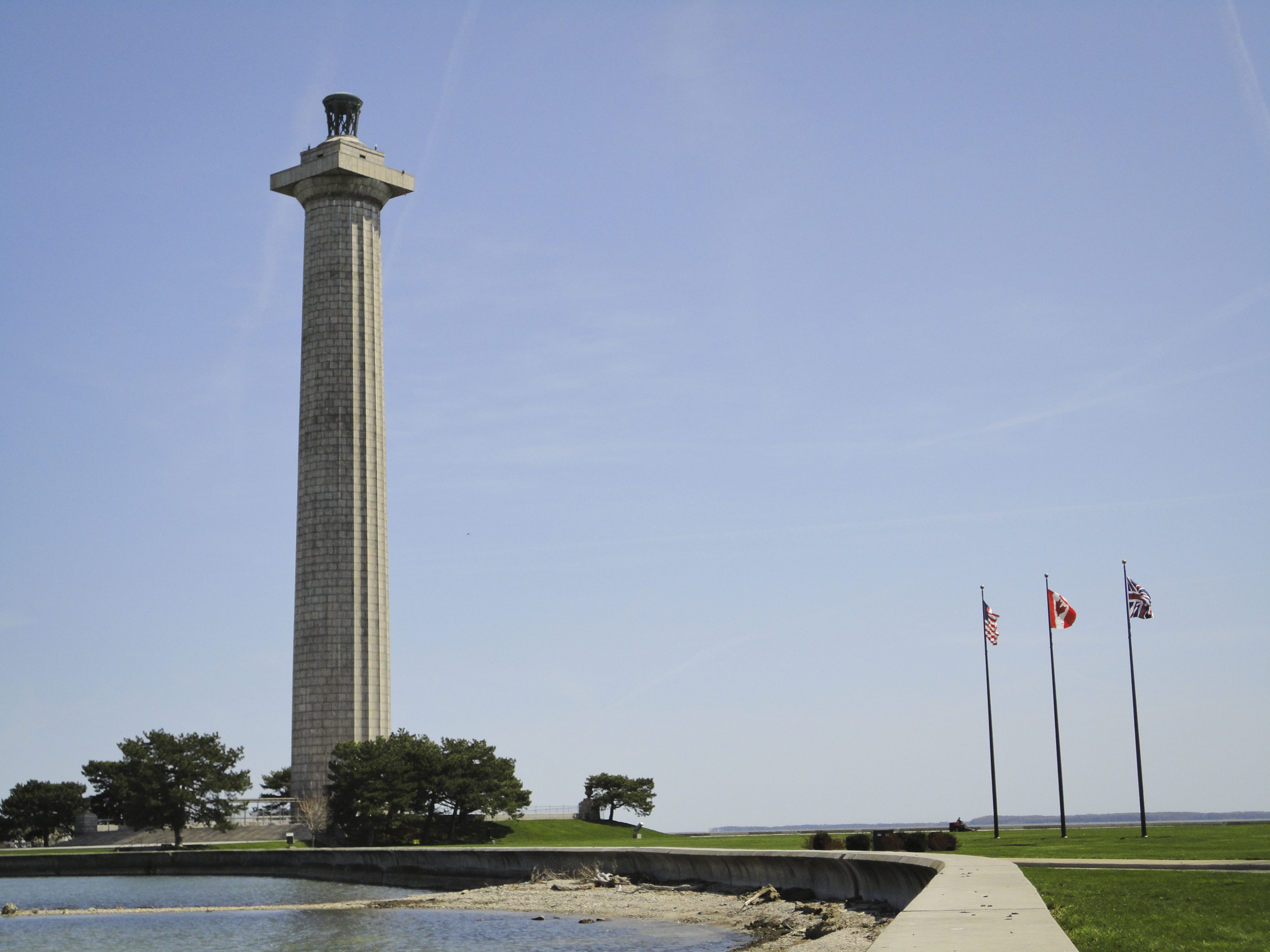
- View of Perry's Victory and International Peace Memorial and the park grounds

- Location within Ohio Location within the United States
- Location: Put-in-Bay, Ohio, U.S.
- Coordinates: 41°39′15″N 82°48′41″W
- Area: 25.38 acres (10.27 ha); 24.97 acres (10.11 ha) federal
- Visitors: 124,327 (in 2025)
- Governing body: National Park Service
- Website: Perry's Victory and International Peace Memorial

U.S. National Memorial
- Designated: June 2, 1936

U.S. National Register of Historic Places
- Designated: October 15, 1966 (original); April 28, 2015 (increase)
- Reference no.: 66000118, 15000185

Perry's Victory and International Peace Memorial is a 352-foot (107 m) tall column and U.S. national memorial in Put-in-Bay, Ohio, built to commemorate the Battle of Lake Erie that took place near South Bass Island. One of the largest naval engagements of the War of 1812, the battle saw American Commodore Oliver Hazard Perry lead a United States Navy squadron to victory over a smaller Royal Navy force under Robert Heriot Barclay. Located on an isthmus on the island, the memorial also celebrates the lasting peace between Britain, Canada, and the United States that followed the war.

== Overview ==
Perry's Victory and International Peace Memorial was established to honor those who fought in the Battle of Lake Erie during the War of 1812, and to celebrate the long-lasting peace among Britain, Canada and the United States. The memorial column, rising over Lake Erie, is situated five miles from the Canada–United States border.

The 352-foot (107 m) monument is the world's tallest Doric column. It was constructed in Put-in-Bay, Ohio, on South Bass Island, by a multi-state commission from 1912 to 1915 "to inculcate the lessons of international peace by arbitration and disarmament." The memorial was designed after an international competition from which the winning design by Joseph H. Freelander and A.D. Seymour was chosen. The column is among the tallest monuments in the United States (the Gateway Arch, San Jacinto Monument, and Washington Monument are taller).

Although substantially completed in 1915, funding problems prevented the proper completion of a fully realized memorial complex. In 1919, the federal government assumed control of the monument and provided additional funding. The official dedication was celebrated on July 31, 1931.

Although the monument bears the name of Oliver Hazard Perry, six officers slain during the battle lay interred under its rotunda, beneath the stone floor of the monument. The remains of the six naval officers are of three Britons and three Americans while Perry himself is buried in Newport, Rhode Island. Carved into the walls inside the rotunda are the names of soldiers and sailors who were killed or injured in the Battle of Lake Erie and the text of the Rush-Bagot Treaty.

The Doric column is the only international peace memorial in the United States National Park System and stands 47 feet taller than the Statue of Liberty in New York Harbor. The upper deck platform is 12 feet higher than the statue of Liberty's torch.

To visit the observation deck near the top, visitors must walk up 37 steps, pay the admission cost, then a National Park Ranger will transport them by elevator to the top. Rangers are stationed at the observation deck to answer questions and speak about the history and surrounding area. Views span Lake Erie, the islands and mainland of Ohio, Michigan, Detroit River and nearby islands in Ontario, including Middle Island, the southernmost point of land in Canada, and part of Point Pelee National Park and Pelee Island.

== Administrative history ==
Established as Perry's Victory and International Peace Memorial National Monument by President Franklin D. Roosevelt on June 2, 1936 (Proclamation No. 2182), the monument was redesignated as a National Memorial and renamed on October 26, 1972. As with all historic areas administered by the National Park Service, the memorial was listed on the National Register of Historic Places on October 15, 1966; the listing's boundaries were increased in 2015. In 2002, $2.4 million was spent on a new visitor center. The memorial is visited by 200,000 people each year.

The memorial had been closed for most of the summer of 2006 after a 500-pound (230 kg) piece of granite broke off the southeast face of the observation deck, falling 315 feet (96 m) and leaving a crater in the plaza in June. No one was injured. Following a structural assessment that deemed it safe for visitors, the memorial reopened on August 26, 2006, with a fence surrounding it. The monument closed on September 30, 2009, for repairs, and reopened on July 12, 2012.

Perry's Victory and International Peace Memorial was selected to represent Ohio in the multi-year America the Beautiful quarters series, honoring a national site from every US state, district, or territory. Its design shows Oliver Hazard Perry on the coin's reverse, depicting the site's statue of Perry with the International Peace Memorial in the distance. The design was selected from eleven proposals.

The monument was closed once again for the summer of 2017 for repairs and cleaning.

The aging sea wall surrounding the monument was rebuilt between 2022–2024. The restoration work contract was valued at $24,964,290.

Annually, the monument site hosts a large Boy Scouts of America camporee hosted by Troop 360 from Port Clinton, Ohio. This camporee attracts a large number of scout troops that camp by the monument grounds. This event, however, is highly susceptible to weather conditions, and has not been held due to flooding concerns.

== Gallery ==
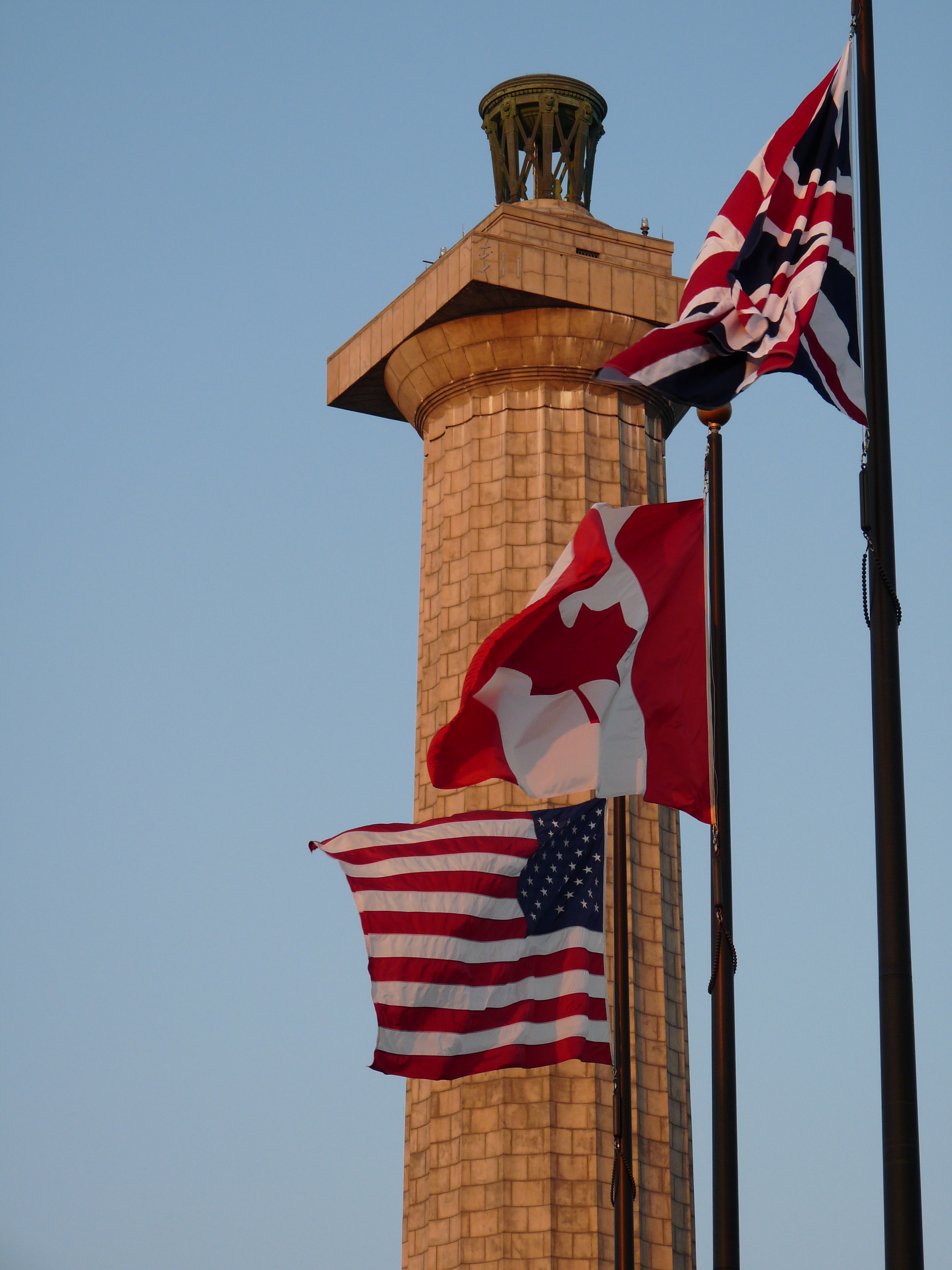
Flags of the US, Canada, and the UK

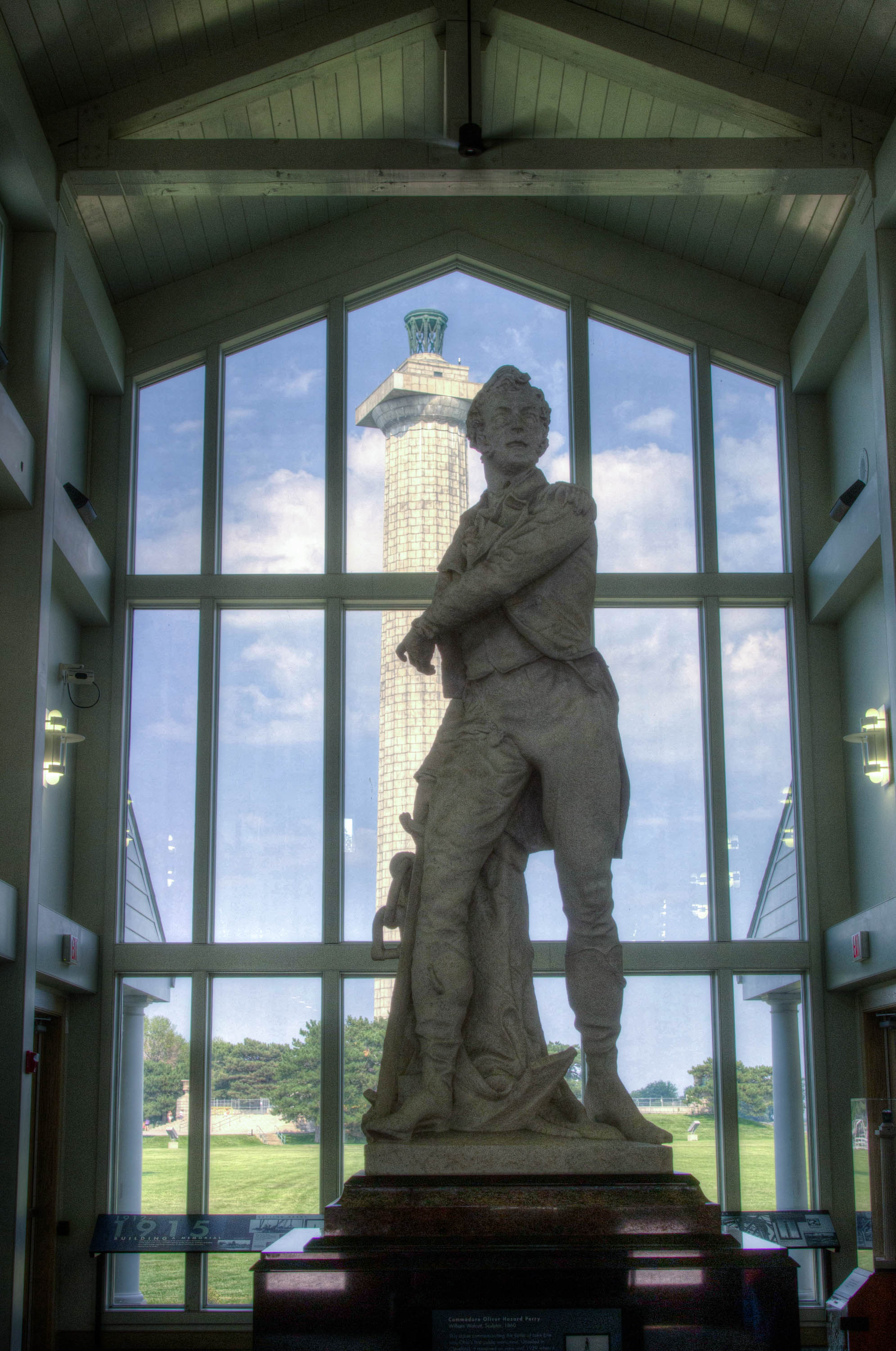
Statue of Commodore Perry in the visitor's center

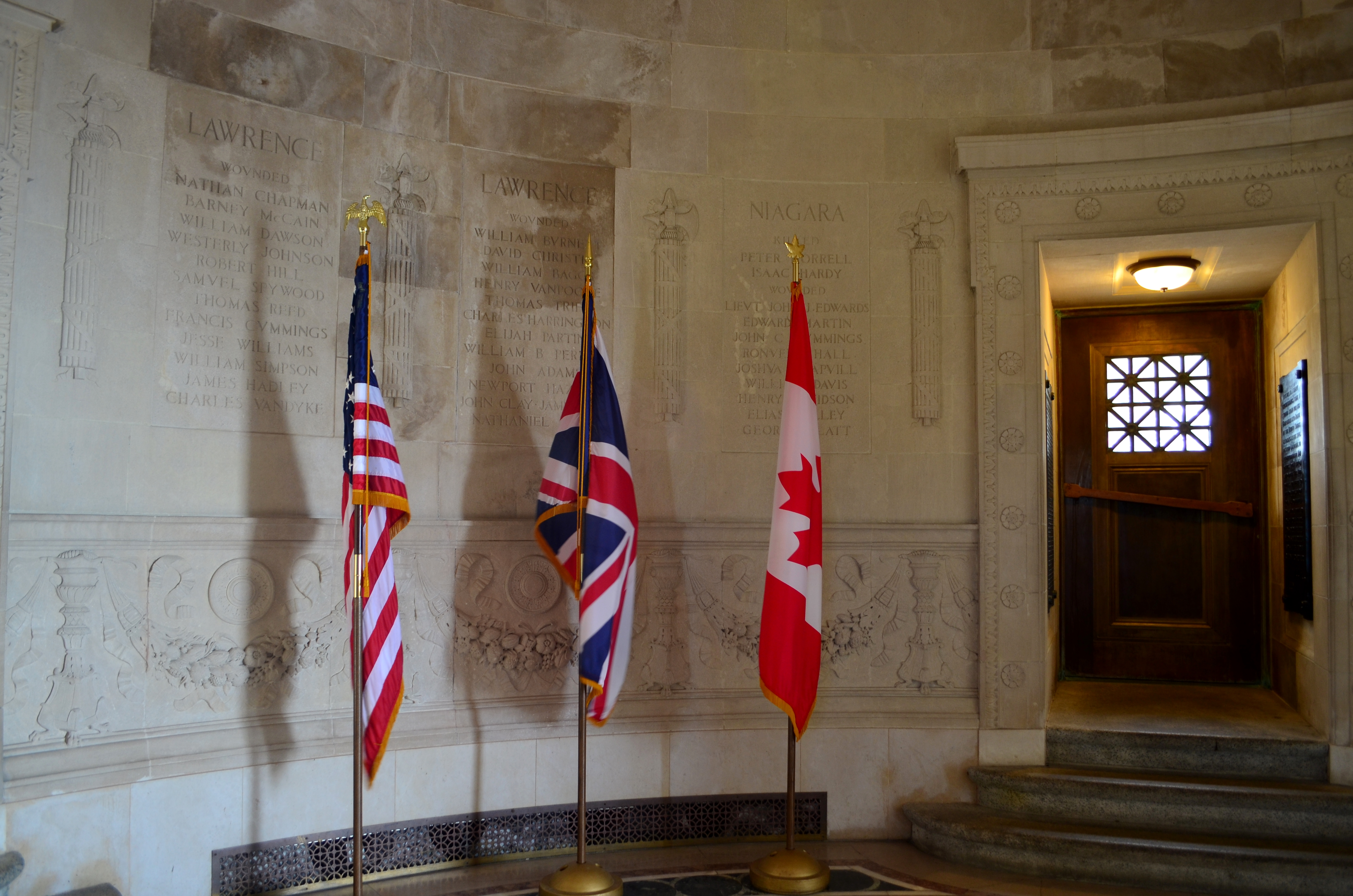
Inside the rotunda at the base of the column

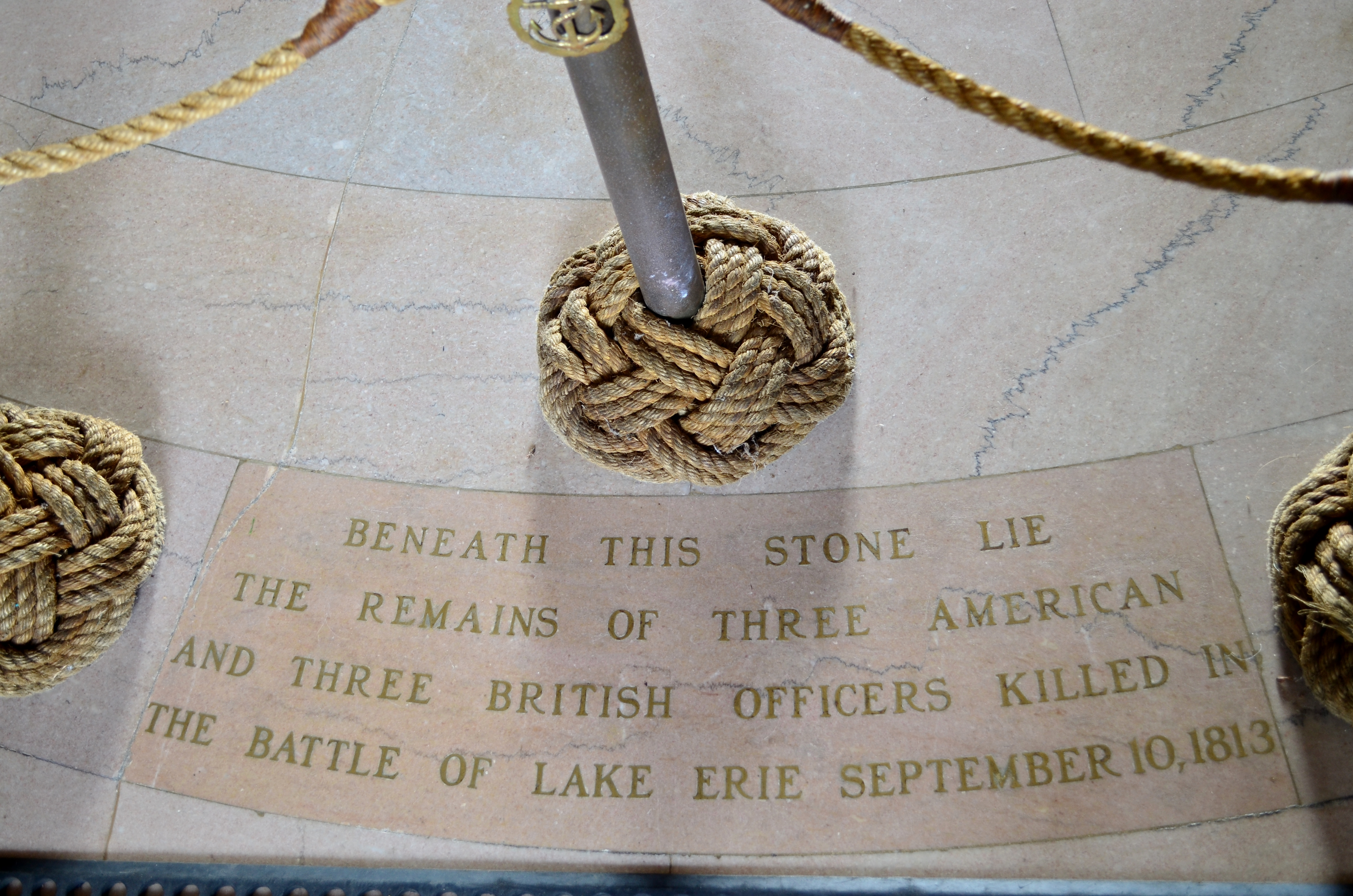
Memorial plaque on the floor of the rotunda

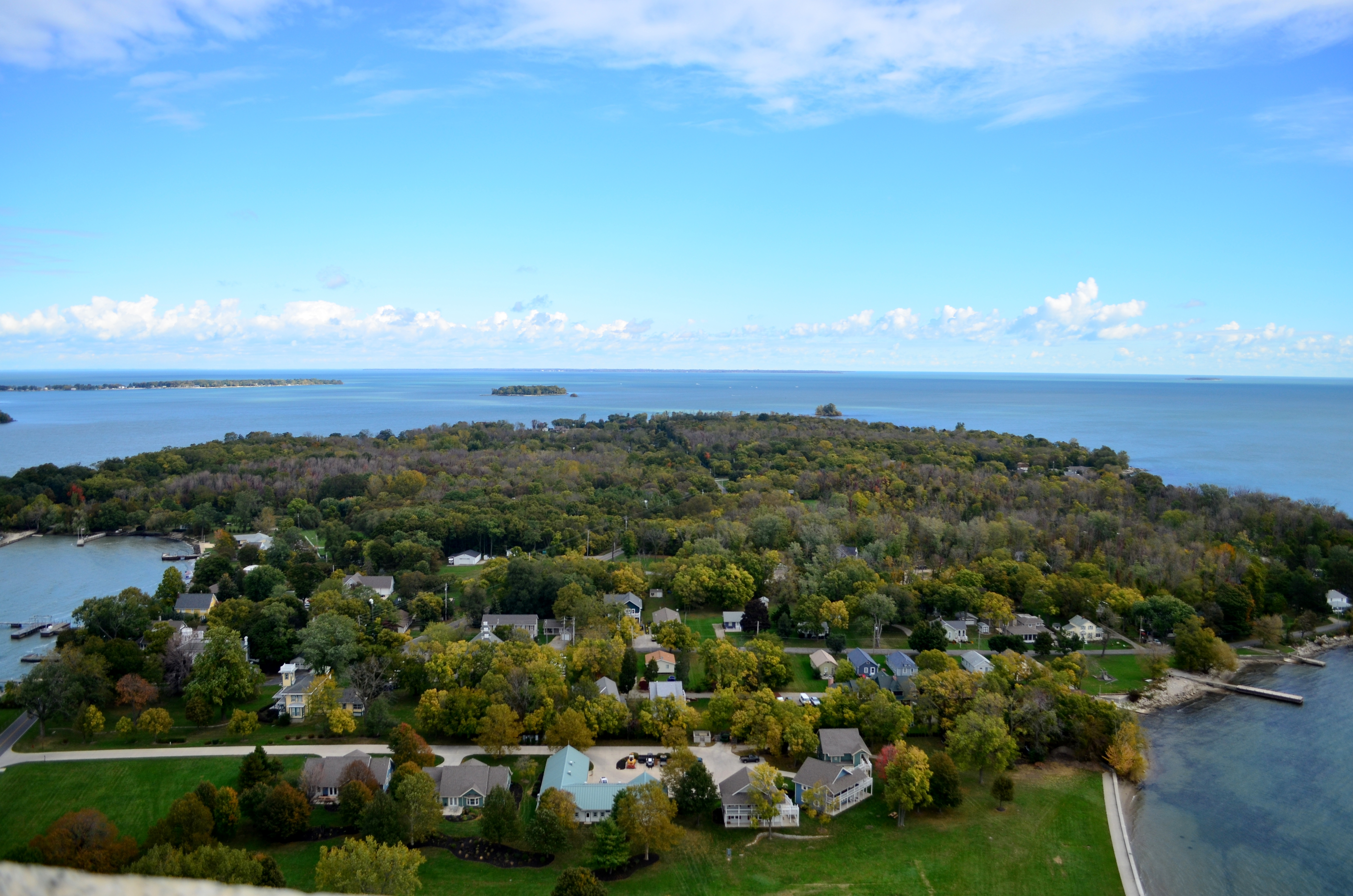
View from the top of the column

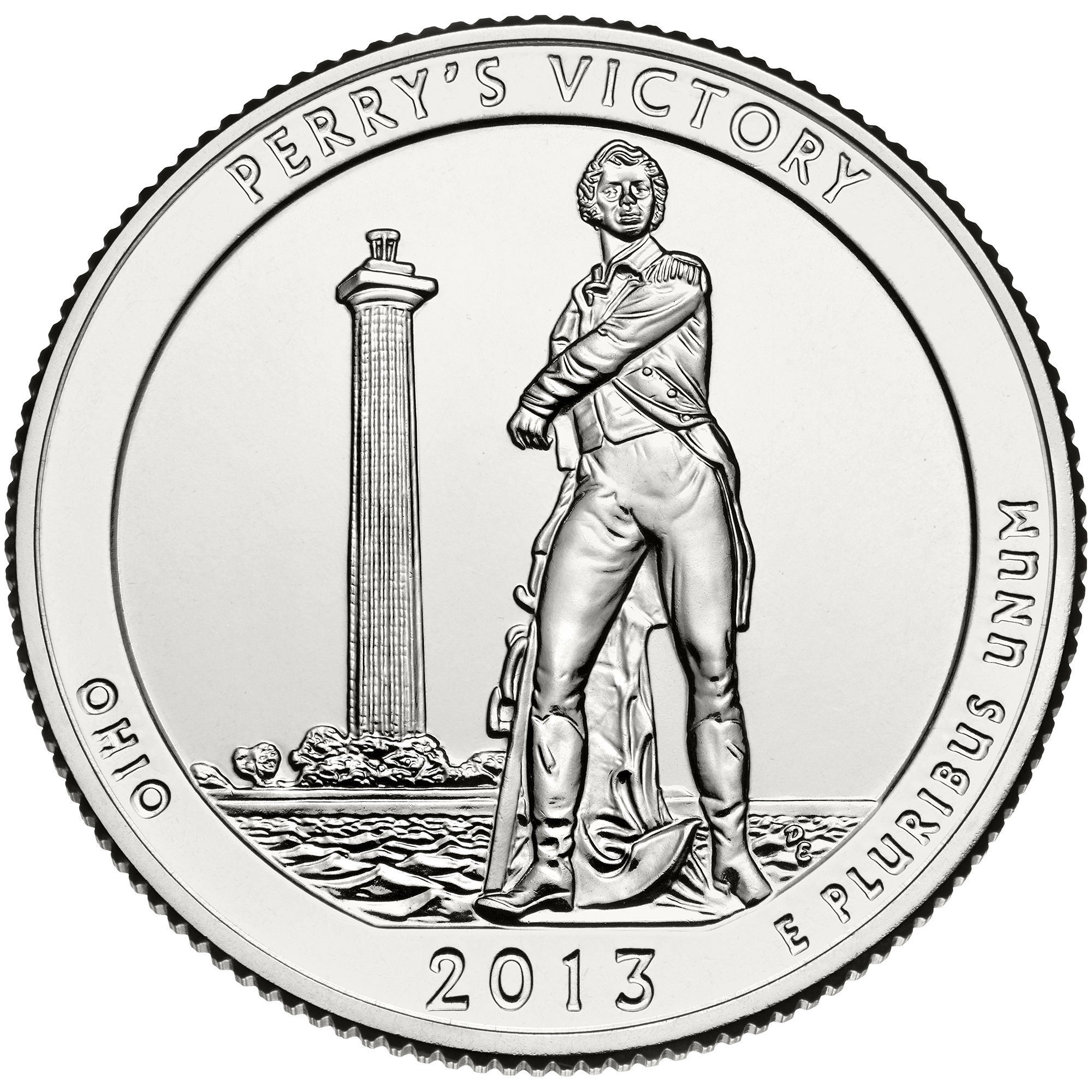
Perry's Victory is featured on Ohio's America the Beautiful quarter.

== See also ==
- Other Navy memorials
- List of national memorials of the United States
