= List of Vanderbilt University Law School alumni =

Following is a list of notable alumni from the Vanderbilt University Law School.

== Academia ==
- Robert L. King (J.D. 1971), 7th chancellor of the State University of New York
- K.C. Potter (J.D. 1964), academic administrator and LGBT rights activist
- Bill Purcell (J.D. 1979), former director of the Institute of Politics at Harvard University's John F. Kennedy School of Government
- Maritza Sáenz Ryan (J.D. 1988), head of the Department of Law at the United States Military Academy and United States Army colonel
- Samuel Cole Williams (LL.B 1884), first dean of the Emory University School of Law

== Attorneys ==
=== Attorneys general ===
- Bruce Bennett (J.D. 1949), 38th Arkansas attorney general
- Steve Freudenthal (J.D. 1975), 28th Wyoming attorney general
- Edwin Hunt, assistant attorney general and U.S. checkers champion (1934)
- Eugene Brooks McLemore (J.D.), 20th Tennessee attorney general
- William Bradford Reynolds (LL.B 1967), assistant attorney general in charge of the US Department of Justice's Civil Rights Division

=== Government ===
- Lawrence Barcella (J.D. 1970), criminal defense lawyer, assistant U.S. attorney for the District of Columbia, lead counsel for the House October Surprise Task Force
- Donald Q. Cochran (J.D. 1992), United States attorney for the United States District Court for the Middle District of Tennessee
- Zachary T. Fardon (J.D. 1992), United States attorney for the Northern District of Illinois and U.S. attorney in Chicago
- Bill Gibbons (J.D.), Memphis district attorney
- David J. Jordan (J.D. 1979), United States attorney for the District of Utah
- Charles M. La Follette (J.D.), deputy chief of counsel for the post-World War II Nuremberg Trials (1947)

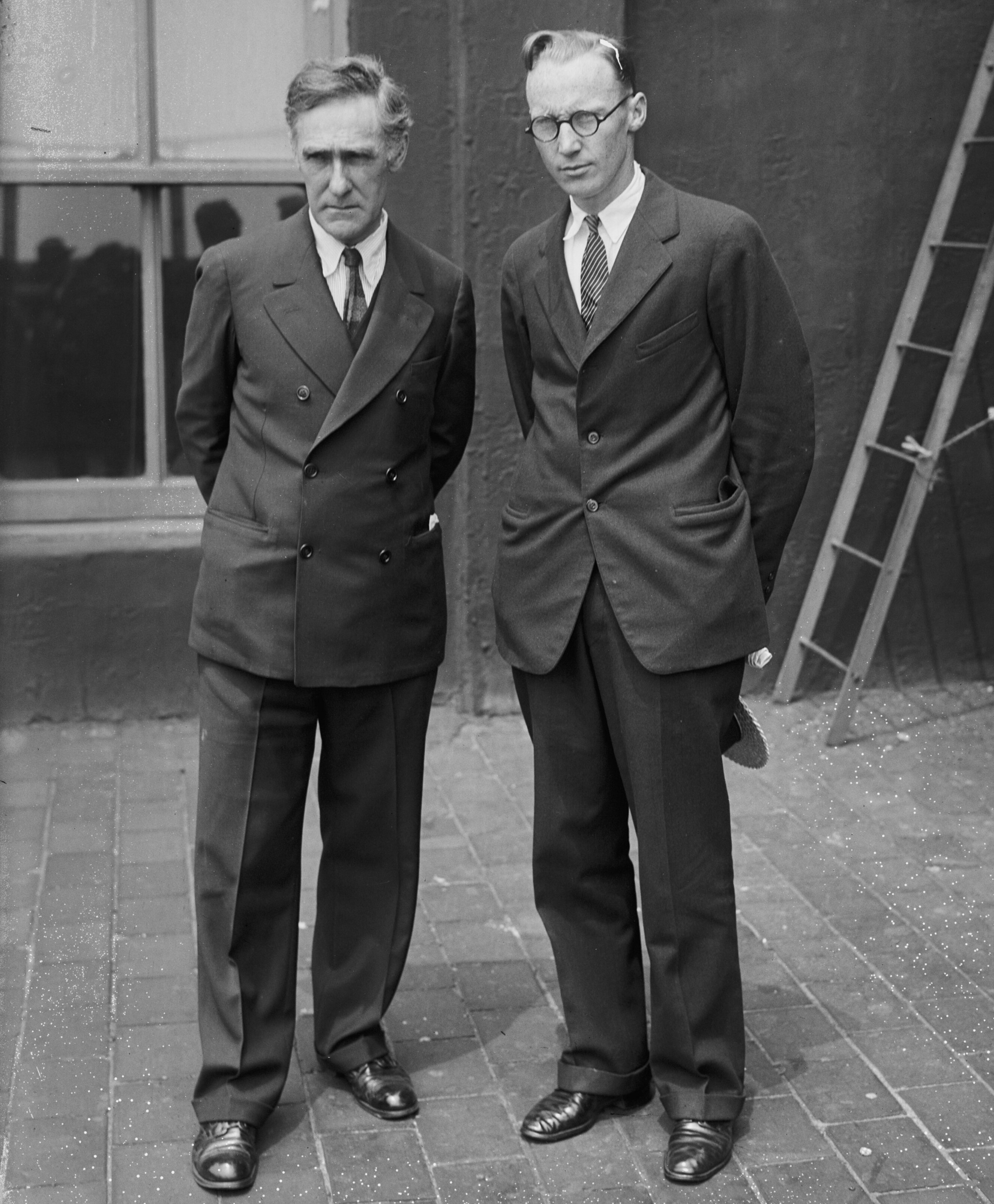
John Randolph Neal Jr.

- Michelle M. Pettit (J.D. 2001), assistant U.S. attorney from California, National Security and Cybercrimes Section

=== Private practice ===
- Bob Blake (LL.B 1908), Rhodes Scholar, president of the Missouri Constitutional Convention in 1944
- Lucius E. Burch Jr. (J.D. 1936), attorney, best known for his contributions to conservation and civil rights, and attorney for Martin Luther King Jr.
- Bobby Lee Cook, defense attorney, inspiration for the television series Matlock main character Ben Matlock, which starred Andy Griffith as a Georgia attorney.
- Margie Pitts Hames (J.D. 1961), civil rights lawyer who argued the abortion rights case Doe v. Bolton before the U.S. Supreme Court
- John Jay Hooker (J.D. 1957), lawyer, entrepreneur, political gadfly, special assistant to Robert F. Kennedy
- Robert J. Kabel (J.D. 1972), attorney and lobbyist involved in developing the Gramm–Leach–Bliley Act (1999) and the Dodd-Frank Act (2010)
- John Bell Keeble (LL.B 1888), attorney, co-founded Keeble, Seay, Stockwell and Keeble
- James F. Neal (J.D. 1957), trial lawyer, Watergate prosecutor who prosecuted Jimmy Hoffa and top officials of the Nixon Administration, special investigator of the Abscam and Iran-contra scandals
- John Randolph Neal Jr. (LL.B 1896), attorney, best known for his role as chief counsel during the 1925 Scopes trial
- Neil Papiano (LL.B 1961), lawyer, and managing partner of Iverson, Yoakum, Papiano & Hatch
- James Gordon Shanklin (LL.B 1935), lawyer, key investigator of the Kennedy assassination, co-implemented the FBI's National Crime Information Center
- Jack Thompson (J.D. 1976), disbarred attorney and activist against obscenity and violence in media and entertainment
- Horace Henry White (LL.B 1887), lawyer, authored legal volumes White's Notarial Guide and White's Analytical Index

== Business ==
- James M. Anderson (J.D. 1966), former president and CEO of the Cincinnati Children's Hospital Medical Center
- Paul S. Atkins (J.D. 1983), CEO of Patomak Global Partners LLC
- Thomas W. Beasley (J.D. 1973), co-founder of CoreCivic
- James W. Bradford (J.D. 1974), former CEO of AFG Industries
- Mark Dalton (J.D. 1975), attorney, CEO of the Tudor Investment Corporation
- Mark L. Feidler (J.D. 1981), chairman of Equifax
- Mitch Glazier (J.D. 1991), chairman and CEO of the Recording Industry Association of America
- Robert Selph Henry (LL.B 1910), vice president of the Association of American Railroads (1934–1958)
- Justin Ishbia (J.D. 2004), businessman and founding partner of Shore Capital Partners
- Jackson W. Moore (J.D. 1973), former executive chairman of Union Planters Bank and Regions Financial Corporation
- Mike McWherter (J.D. 1981), chairman of the board of First State Bank
- Grant Starrett (J.D. 2009), American real estate developer
- Bill Steltemeier (J.D.), founding president of the Eternal Word Television Network
- Tom Tait (J.D. 1985), CEO of Tait & Associates, Inc. and Tait Environmental Services, Inc.
- Darrin Williams (J.D. 1993), former politician, CEO of Southern Bancorp Inc.

== Entertainment ==
- Eric L. Harry (J.D. 1984), author best known for his novels Arc Light and Invasion
- Merle Hazard (J.D. 1993), satirist known as the 'Weird Al' of Wall Street"
- Steven Machat (J.D. 1977), entertainment mogul
- Clay Travis (J.D. 2004), journalist, writer, tv analyst; host, The Clay Travis and Buck Sexton Show; founder, OutKick

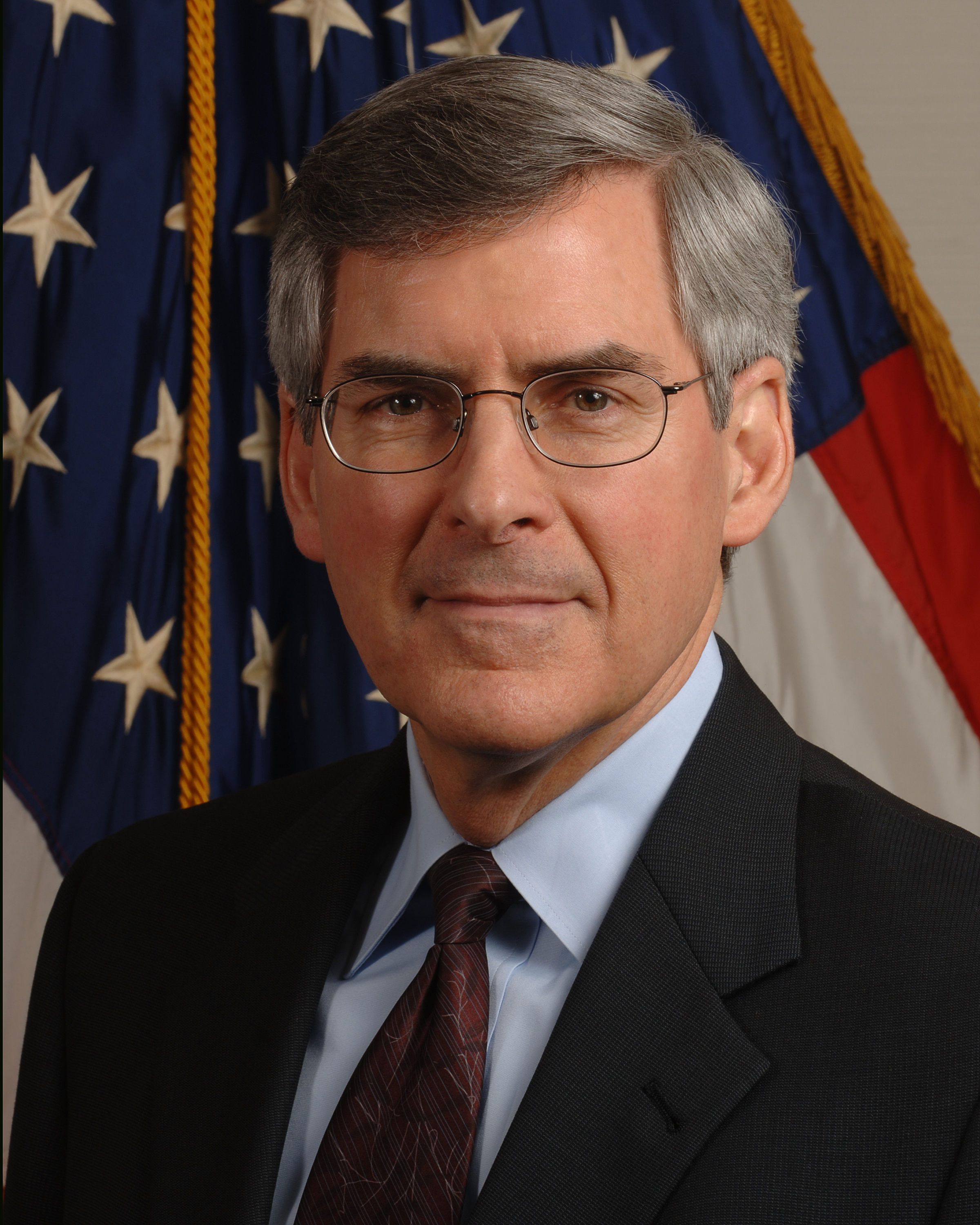
Bill Corr

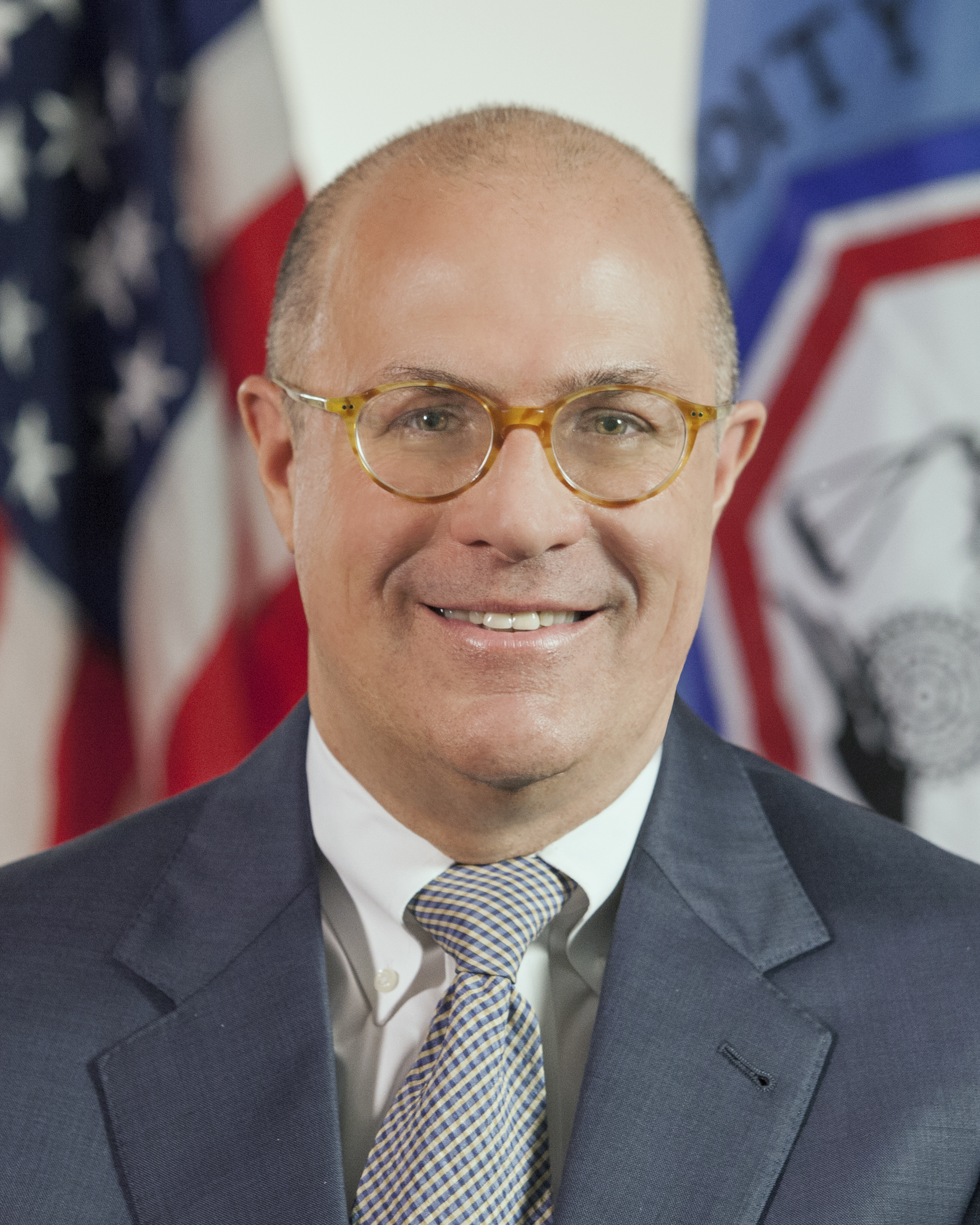
J. Christopher Giancarlo

== Government ==
- Paul S. Atkins (J.D. 1983), 34th chairman of the Securities and Exchange Commission
- Bill Corr (J.D.), chief of staff for the secretary of Health and Human Services and deputy secretary of the HHS
- James Danly (J.D. 2013), commissioner of the Federal Energy Regulatory Commission
- Phyllis Fong (J.D. 1978), inspector general of the United States Department of Agriculture
- Vince Foster, former deputy White House chief of staff
- J. Christopher Giancarlo (J.D. 1984), former chairman of the United States Commodity Futures Trading Commission (CFTC)
- Dorsey B. Hardeman (LL.B), former executive director and commissioner of the Texas Water Commission
- E. William Henry (J.D. 1957), Federal Communications Commission chairman (1963–1966)
- Robert L. King (J.D. 1971), assistant secretary of Education, serving as head of the Office of Postsecondary Education
- W. H. Kornegay (LL.B 1890), delegate to Oklahoma Constitutional Convention
- Howard Liebengood (J.D. 1967), 27th sergeant at arms of the United States Senate
- James McHenry III (J.D. 2003), director, Executive Office for Immigration Review, former acting attorney general of the United States
- Paul C. Ney Jr. (JD, MBA 1984), general counsel of the Department of Defense of the United States
- Steve Owens (J.D. 1981), chairman of the U.S. Chemical Safety Board
- Stephen D. Potts (LL.B 1954), 4th director of the United States Office of Government Ethics
- Ronald J. Rychlak (J.D. 1983), adviser of the Holy See to the United Nations, delegate of the Assembly of States Parties to the International Criminal Court
- Michael Shaheen (J.D. 1965), 1st director of the U.S. Department of Justice Office of Professional Responsibility
- Hans von Spakovsky (J.D. 1984), Federal Election Commission commissioner
- Walton J. Wood, first public defender in U.S. history (Los Angeles County)
- Yoo Myung-hee (J.D. 2002), minister for trade of South Korea

== Judicial ==
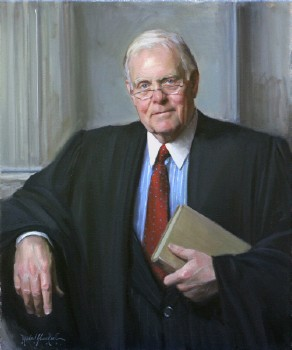
Gilbert S. Merritt Jr.

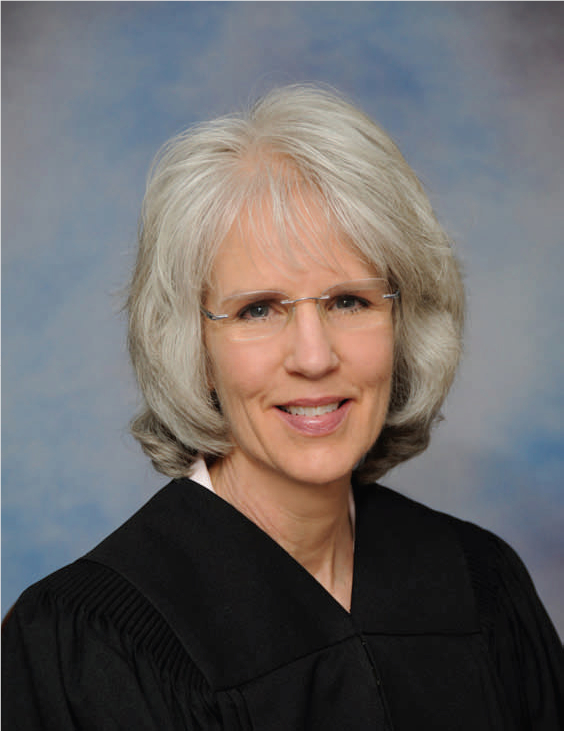
Jane Branstetter Stranch

=== Federal ===
- Tamara W. Ashford (J.D. 1994), Article I judge of the United States Tax Court
- Jennings Bailey (LL.B 1890), U.S. district judge of the United States District Court for the District of Columbia
- Megan Benton (J.D. 2010), U.S. district judge for the United States District Court for the Western District of Missouri
- Claria Horn Boom (J.D. 1994), U.S. district judge of the United States District Court for Eastern and Western Kentucky
- Waverly D. Crenshaw Jr. (J.D. 1981), U.S. district judge of the United States District Court for the Middle District of Tennessee
- Martha Craig Daughtrey (J.D. 1968), senior U.S. circuit judge of the United States Court of Appeals for the Sixth Circuit
- Mary Dimke (J.D. 2002), U.S. district judge of the United States District Court for the Eastern District of Washington
- William Joseph Haynes Jr. (J.D. 1973), U.S. district judge of the United States District Court for the Middle District of Tennessee
- Thomas Aquinas Higgins (LL.B 1957), U.S. district judge of the United States District Court for the Middle District of Tennessee
- John W. Holland (LL.B 1906), U.S. district judge of the United States District Court for the Southern District of Florida
- Oscar Richard Hundley (LL.B 1877) – United States Federal Judge by recess appointment from President Theodore Roosevelt
- Jeremy Kernodle (J.D. 2001), U.S. district judge of the United States District Court for the Eastern District of Texas
- James C. Mahan (J.D. 1973), senior U.S. district judge of the United States District Court for the District of Nevada
- Gilbert S. Merritt Jr. (LL.B 1960), lawyer and jurist, senior United States circuit judge of the United States Court of Appeals for the Sixth Circuit
- Jon Phipps McCalla (J.D. 1974), senior U.S. district judge of the United States District Court for the Western District of Tennessee
- Leon Clarence McCord (Law, 1900), senior United States circuit judge of the United States Court of Appeals for the Fifth Circuit
- Travis Randall McDonough (J.D. 1997), U.S. district judge of the United States District Court for the Eastern District of Tennessee
- Brian Stacy Miller (J.D. 1995), chief U.S. district judge of the United States District Court for the Eastern District of Arkansas
- John Trice Nixon (LL.B 1960), senior U.S. district judge of the United States District Court for the Middle District of Tennessee
- Tommy Parker (J.D. 1989), U.S. district judge of the United States District Court for the Western District of Tennessee
- Thomas W. Phillips (J.D. 1969), senior U.S. district judge of the United States District Court for the Eastern District of Tennessee
- Jonathan Pittman (J.D. 1990), associate judge of the Superior Court of the District of Columbia
- Sam C. Pointer Jr. (A.B. 1955), U.S. district judge for Northern Alabama, noted figure in complex multidistrict class-action litigation
- Kevin H. Sharp (J.D. 1993), U.S. district judge of the United States District Court for the Middle District of Tennessee
- Jane Branstetter Stranch (J.D. 1978), United States circuit judge of the United States Court of Appeals for the Sixth Circuit
- Aleta Arthur Trauger (M.A. 1972), U.S. district judge of the United States District Court for the Middle District of Tennessee
- Thomas A. Varlan (J.D. 1981), chief U.S. district judge of the United States District Court for the Eastern District of Tennessee
- Roger Vinson (J.D. 1971), senior U.S. district judge of the United States District Court for the Northern District of Florida, former member of the United States Foreign Intelligence Surveillance Court
- Billy Roy Wilson (J.D. 1965), senior U.S. district judge of the United States District Court for the Eastern District of Arkansas
- Thomas A. Wiseman Jr. (J.D. 1954), senior U.S. district judge of the United States District Court for the Middle District of Tennessee
- Harry W. Wellford (LL.B 1950), senior circuit judge of the United States Court of Appeals for the Sixth Circuit
- Staci Michelle Yandle (J.D. 1987) – U.S. district judge of the United States District Court for the Southern District of Illinois

=== State ===
- Jeffrey S. Bivins (J.D. 1986), chief justice of the Supreme Court of Tennessee
- John P. Bourcier (J.D. 1953), former justice of the Rhode Island Supreme Court
- Albert M. Clark (LL.B 1900), former justice of the Supreme Court of Missouri
- Cornelia Clark (J.D. 1979), former chief of the Tennessee Supreme Court
- Larry Creson (LL.B 1928), former justice of the Tennessee Supreme Court
- Frank P. Culver Jr. (B.A. 1911), former justice of the Supreme Court of Texas
- Frank Drowota (B.A. 1960, J.D. 1965), former chief justice of the Tennessee Supreme Court
- Eric Eisnaugle (J.D. 2003), justice of the Florida Fifth District Court of Appeal
- Andrew O. Holmes (LL.B. 1929), justice of the Tennessee Supreme Court
- Albert C. Hunt (LL.B 1909), former justice of the Supreme Court of Oklahoma
- William C. Koch Jr. (J.D. 1972), former justice of the Tennessee Supreme Court
- W. H. Kornegay (LL.B 1890), former justice of the Oklahoma Supreme Court
- Benjamin K. Miller (J.D. 1961), former chief justice of the Illinois Supreme Court
- John Musmanno (J.D. 1966), senior judge of the Pennsylvania Superior Court
- Tom Parker (J.D.), former chief justice of the Alabama Supreme Court
- Marlin T. Phelps (J.D.), former chief justice of the Supreme Court of Arizona
- John F. Simms Sr. (J.D. 1906) – former justice of the New Mexico Supreme Court
- Sarah Hicks Stewart (J.D. 1992), chief justice of the Supreme Court of Alabama
- Samuel Cole Williams (LL.B 1884), former justice of the Tennessee Supreme Court
- Walton J. Wood, former justice of the California Court of Appeal

== Military ==
- Henry L. Brandon (J.D.), United States naval aviator, Corsair Fighter-Bomber Squadron VBF-82
- Maritza Sáenz Ryan (J.D. 1988), United States Army colonel, first female and Hispanic head of the Department of Law at the United States Military Academy
- Evander Shapard (LL.B 1917), Royal Air Force World War I flying ace, 92 Squadron, six victories flying the S.E.5a, British Distinguished Flying Cross
- Gordon O. Tanner (J.D. 1973) – general counsel of the U.S. Air Force

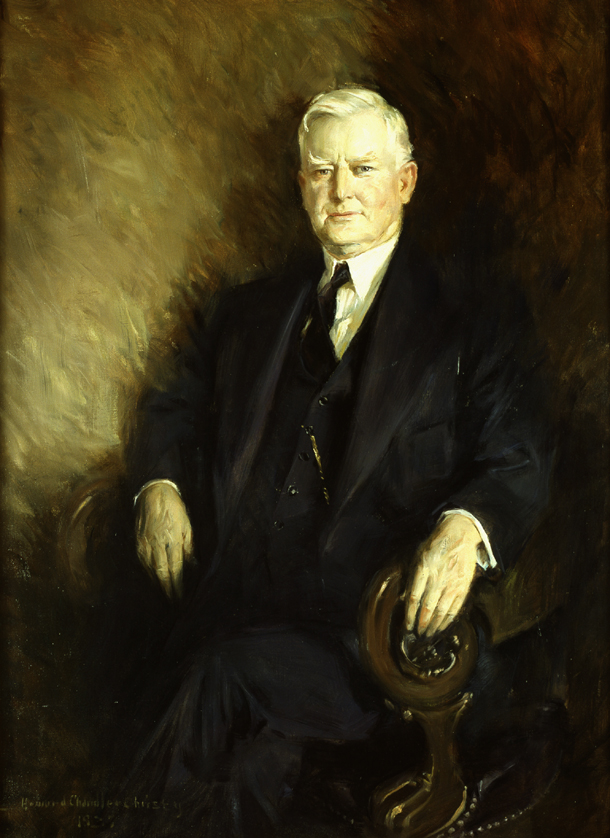
John Nance Garner

== Politics ==
=== U.S. vice presidents ===
- John Nance Garner (Law, 1886), 32nd vice president of the United States and 39th speaker of the United States House of Representatives
- Al Gore, (Law, 1974–1976), 45th vice president of the United States, United States senator, United States representative, and 2000 Democratic Party presidential nominee

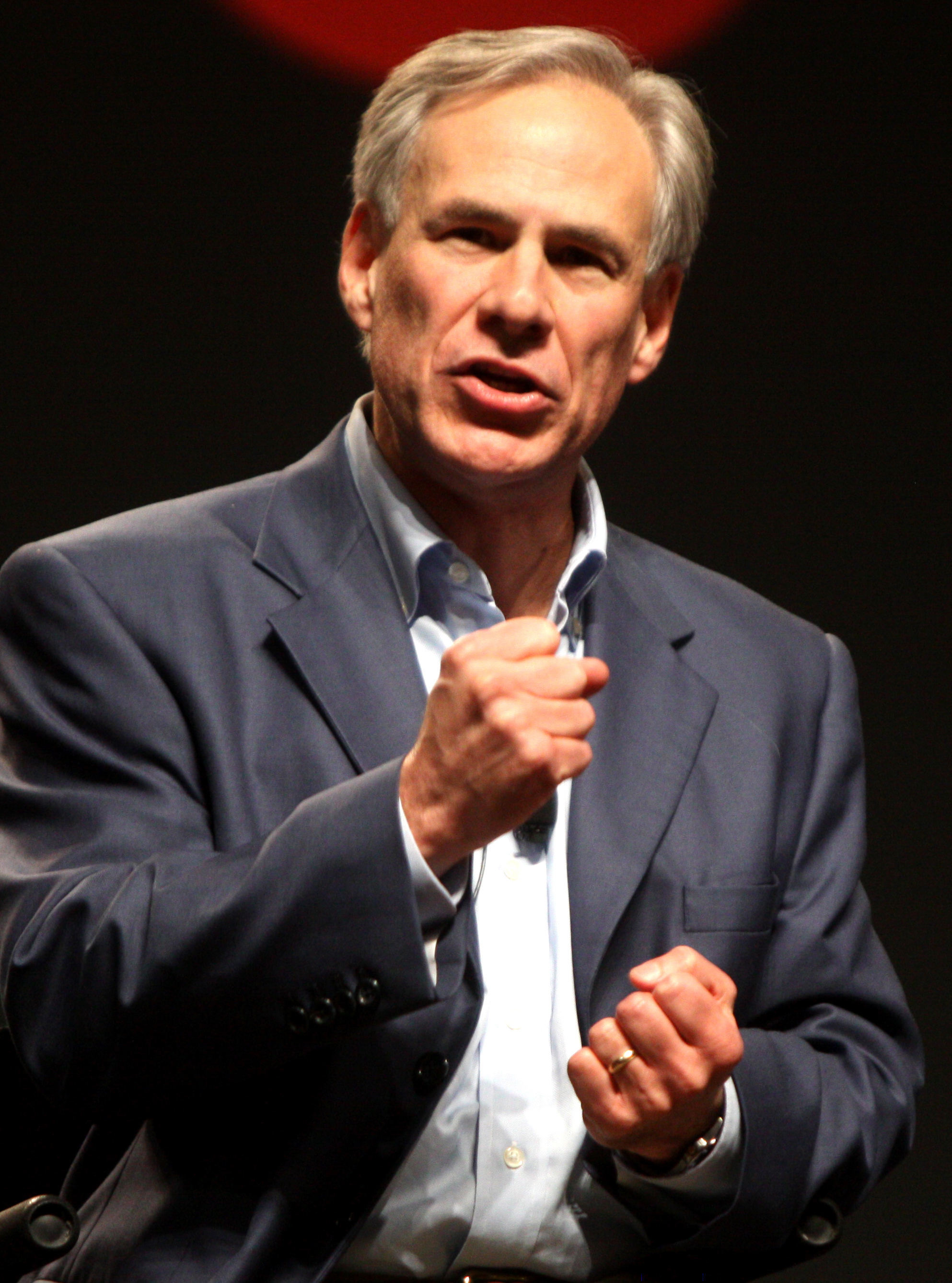
Greg Abbott

=== Governors ===
- Greg Abbott (J.D. 1984), 48th governor of Texas
- Theodore Bilbo (Law, 1900), 39th and 43rd governor of Mississippi (1916–1920; 1928–1932)
- Frank G. Clement (LL.B 1942), 41st governor of Tennessee (1963–1967)
- Lee Cruce (Law, 1885), 2nd governor of Oklahoma (1911–1915)
- Jeff Davis (Law, 1882), 20th governor of Arkansas (1901–1907)
- Joseph W. Folk (LL.B 1890), 31st governor of Missouri (1905–1909)
- Hill McAlister (LL.B 1897), 34th governor of Tennessee (1933–1937)
- Malcolm R. Patterson (Law, 1882), 30th governor of Tennessee (1907–1911)

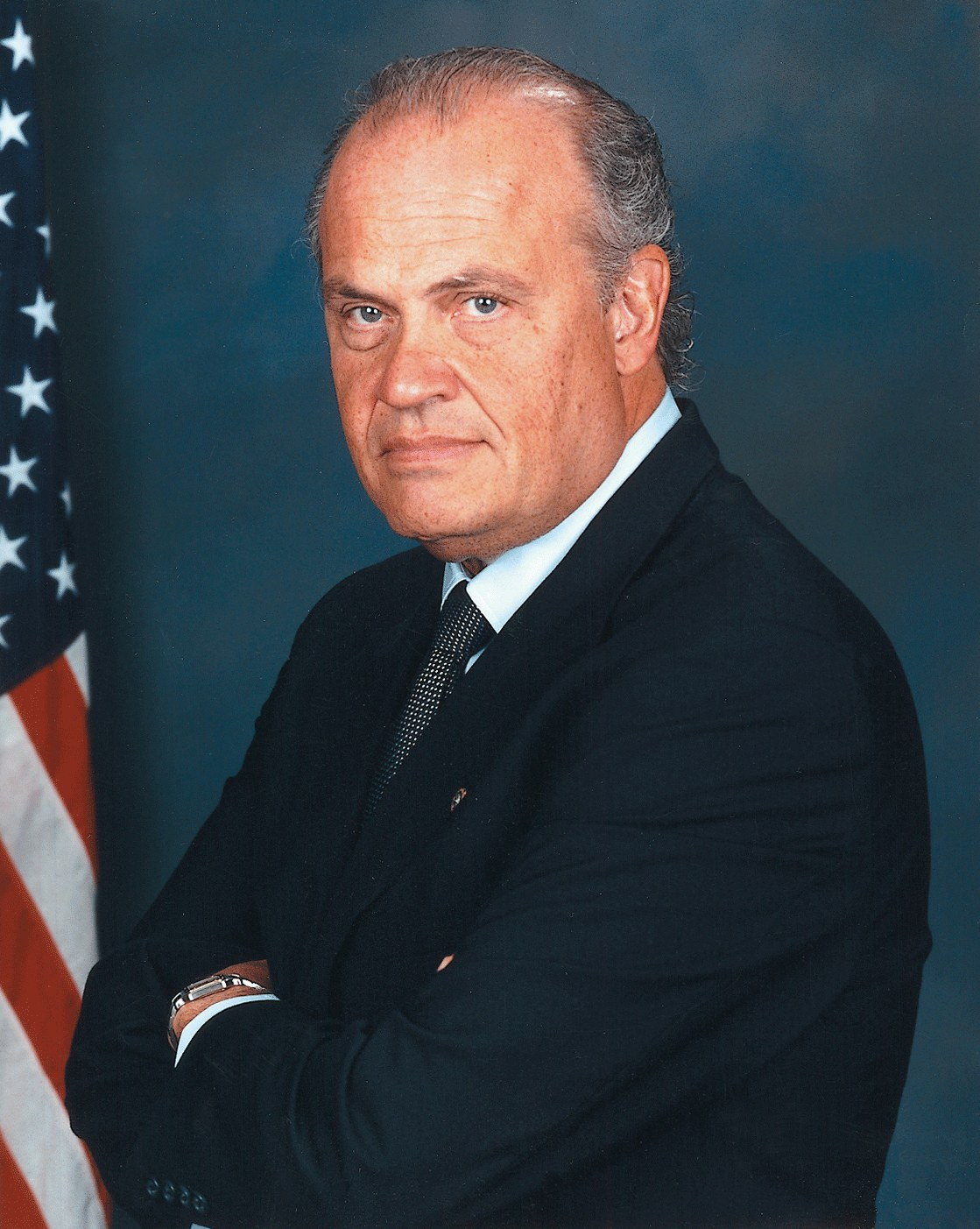
Fred Thompson

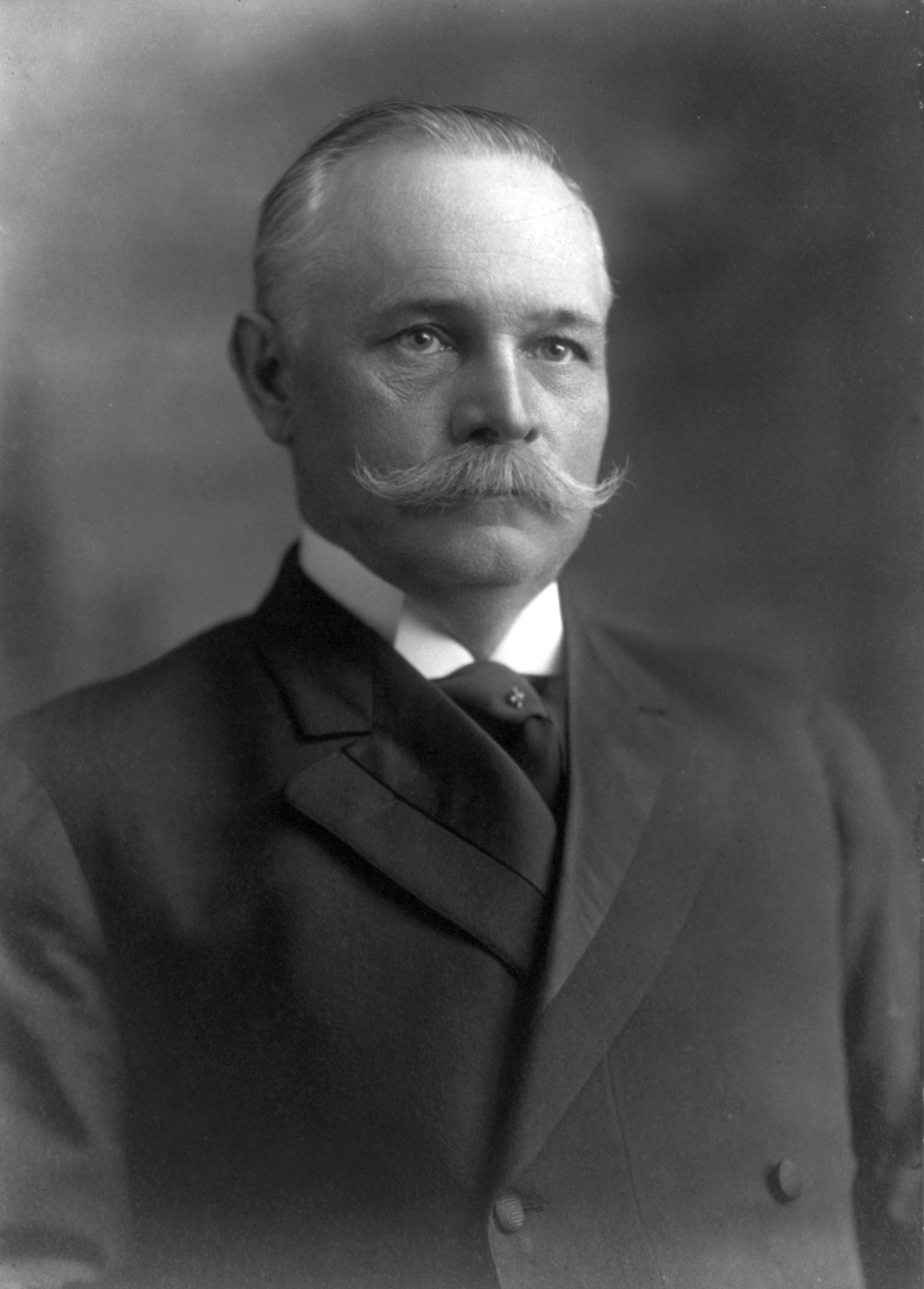
Duncan U. Fletcher

=== U.S. senators ===
- Theodore Bilbo (Law, 1900), United States senator from Mississippi (1935–1947)
- Jeff Davis (LL.B 1881), United States senator from Arkansas (1907–1913)
- Duncan U. Fletcher (LL.B 1880), United States senator from Florida (1909–1936)
- Bill Hagerty (B.A. 1981, J.D. 1984), United States senator from Tennessee (2021– )
- Jim Sasser (LL.B 1961), United States senator from Tennessee (1977–1995)
- William V. Sullivan (LL.B 1875), United States senator from Mississippi (1898–1901)
- Fred Dalton Thompson (J.D. 1967), United States senator from Tennessee (1994–2003)

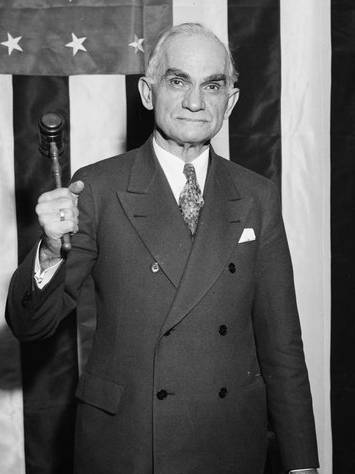
Jo Byrns

=== U.S. representatives ===
- William Vollie Alexander, Jr. (J.D. 1960), United States representative from Arkansas (1969–1993)
- John L. Burnett (Law 1876), United States representative from Alabama (1899–1919)
- Jo Byrns (LL.B 1882), 41st Speaker of the United States House of Representatives
- Joseph W. Byrns Jr. (J.D. 1928), United States representative from Tennessee (1938–1941)
- William Wirt Hastings (J.D. 1889), United States representative from Oklahoma (1915–1921)
- Henderson M. Jacoway (J.D. 1898), United States representative from Arkansas (1911–1923)
- Joseph T. Johnson (LL.B 1883), United States representative from South Carolina (1901–1915)
- Ric Keller (J.D. 1992), United States representative from Florida (2001–2009)
- Charles M. La Follette (J.D.), United States representative from Indiana (1943–1947)
- Leonard Lance (J.D. 1977), United States representative from New Jersey (2009– )
- Fritz G. Lanham (Law, 1897–98), United States representative from Texas (1919–1947)
- Oscar Lovette (J.D. 1896), United States representative from Tennessee (1931–1933)
- Luke Messer (J.D. 1994), United States representative from Indiana (2013– )
- Malcolm R. Patterson (Law, 1882), United States representative from Tennessee (1901–1906)
- Ben Quayle (J.D. 2002), United States representative from Arizona (2011–2013)
- Frazier Reams (J.D. 1922), United States representative from Ohio (1951–1955)
- Charles C. Reid (J.D. 1887), United States representative from Arkansas (1901–1911)
- John Rose (J.D. 1993), United States representative from Tennessee (2019– )
- Joseph E. Washington (LL.B 1874), United States representative from Tennessee (1887–1897)

=== Ambassadors and diplomats ===
- Alvin P. Adams Jr. (J.D.), former United States ambassador to Peru, Haiti, and Djibouti
- Thomas C. Ferguson (J.D. 1959), 2nd United States ambassador to Brunei
- Bill Hagerty (J.D. 1984), 30th United States ambassador to Japan
- Gautam A. Rana (J.D. 1997), 10th United States ambassador to Slovakia
- Jim Sasser (J.D. 1961), 44th United States ambassador to China

=== State ===
- George Street Boone (J.D. 1941), member of the Kentucky House of Representatives
- Lance Cargill (J.D. 1996), speaker of the Oklahoma House of Representatives
- Riley Darnell (J.D. 1965), Tennessee secretary of state
- Neria Douglass (J.D. 1977), 50th Maine state treasurer
- Douglas Henry (J.D. 1951), member of the Tennessee Senate representing the 21st district, activist
- Roy Herron (J.D. 1980), former chairman of the Tennessee Democratic Party
- John Jay Hooker (J.D. 1957), former candidate for governor of Tennessee
- William Harding Mayes (LL.B 1881), lieutenant governor of Texas
- J. Washington Moore (LL.B 1891), Tennessee state representative
- Howard T. Owens Jr. (J.D. 1959), former member of the Connecticut Senate
- E. Melvin Porter (J.D. 1959), member of the Oklahoma Senate, civil rights leader
- Edward T. Seay (LL.B 1891), speaker of the Tennessee Senate
- David Simmons (J.D. 1977), member of the Florida Senate
- Jody Wagner (J.D. 1980), 12th Virginia secretary of Finance
- David Wasinger (J.D. 1988), 49th lieutenant governor of Missouri
- Justin P. Wilson (J.D. 1970), lawyer, Tennessee state comptroller of the treasury

=== Local officials ===
- Thomas L. Cummings Sr. (J.D. 1915), 61st Mayor of Nashville
- J. Kane Ditto (J.D. 1969), 45th mayor of Jackson, Mississippi
- Dorsey B. Hardeman (LL.B 1931), 9th mayor of San Angelo, Texas
- Bill Purcell (J.D. 1979), 67th mayor of Nashville
- Sam Sutter (J.D. 1983), 43rd mayor of Fall River, Massachusetts
- Tom Tait (J.D. 1985), 45th mayor of Anaheim, California

=== Other ===
- Pauline LaFon Gore (LL.B. 1936), mother of former United States Vice President Al Gore, political campaigner
- Fred Graham (LL.B 1959), chief anchor and managing editor of the former Court TV, legal correspondent for the New York Times, and CBS News
