= Kentucky Route 106 =

State highway in Kentucky, United States

Kentucky Route 106
- KY 106 highlighted in red

Route information
- Maintained by KYTC
- Length: 34.985 mi (56.303 km)

Major junctions
- South/West end: KY 181 near Elkton
- KY 171 northeast of Elkton; KY 178 / KY 507 at Claymour; US 431 in Lewisburg; KY 1153 in Quality
- North/East end: KY 70 near Rochester

Location
- Country: United States
- State: Kentucky
- Counties: Butler, Logan, Todd

Highway system
- Kentucky State Highway System; Interstate; US; State; Parkways
← KY 105	→ KY 107

Kentucky Route 106 (KY 106) is a 35-mile-long (56 km) east-west state highway traversing three counties in west-central Kentucky.

== Route description ==
=== Todd and Logan Counties ===
It begins at an intersection with KY 181 just north of Elkton about 750 feet (230 m) north of the present route of U.S. Route 68 (US 68). The route passes through mainly rural areas of Todd County and has an intersection with KY 171. At Claymour, it has a crossroad intersection that marks the eastern terminus of KY 507, and the western terminus of KY 178. It then goes through the unincorporated community of Sharon Grove, where a roadside market called the "Hwy 106 Market" is located at a crossroad intersection with two local county-maintained roads, Mount Sharon Road and H Gorbel Road.

After passing through Sharon Grove, the highway enters Logan County about a few feet east of the intersection with Crawford Road, and then has intersections with KY 2376 (Green Ridge-Spa Road), and another one with KY 1151 (Epleys-Stuart Church Road), both are secondary routes in Logan County. The highway makes it to Lewisburg, and runs concurrently with US 431. Only a few hundred feet away from that intersection, the highway intersects KY 107. A few hundred more feet after that, KY 106 breaks away from US 431, and follows Stacker Street into downtown Lewisburg. It then goes through rural areas of northern Logan County after it crosses the Mud River.

=== Butler County ===
KY 106 enters Butler County just south of the small town of Quality where it runs concurrently with KY 1153 for about 1,000 feet (300 m). Despite being an even-numbered state highway, KY 106 becomes a north–south oriented roadway upon entry into Butler County. The highway has intersections with KY 1187, and then KY 949 before reaching its end just north of Huntsville at an intersection with KY 70, the major artery connecting nearby Rochester to the Butler County seat, Morgantown.

== History ==
KY 106 originally began at Allegre when it was first commissioned in 1929. At some point in the late 1940s, KY 106 was extended further northwest to Kirkmansville, 6 miles (9.7 km) west of Clifty. After that point in time, It followed the course of the current KY 171 from the KY 107 junction to where KY 171's current terminus is located. At sometime between 1969 and 1972, KY 106 was rerouted onto Blue and Gray Park Road off KY 181 just northeast of Elkton and it makes a right turn onto its current alignment, with KY 171 being extended to include its current run through Allegre, across KY 181, and ending at this intersection. The original alignment of Kentucky Route 344 followed Blue and Gray Park Road during the 1930s and 1940s. KY 344 originally served the now-defunct Blue and Gray State Park.

== Major intersections ==
County	Location	mi	km	Destinations	Notes
Todd	Elkton	0.000	0.000	KY 181 (Greenville Road) – Elkton, Clifty, Greenville	Western/Southern terminus
Todd		2.646	4.258	KY 171 north – Allegre	Southern terminus of KY 171
Todd	Claymour	1.639	2.638	KY 178 east (Highland Lick Road) / KY 507 west (Claymour-Russellville Road) – Allegre, Russellville	Eastern terminus of KY 507; Western terminus of KY 178
Logan	Spa	13.326	21.446	KY 2376 south (Green Ridge-Spa Road)	Northern terminus of KY 2376
Logan		14.545	23.408	KY 1151 south (Stuart Chapel Road)	Northern terminus of KY 1151
Logan	Lewisburg	16.329	26.279	US 431 south (South Main St.) – Russellville	Southern end of US 431 overlap
Logan	Lewisburg	16.542	26.622	KY 107 south (Deer Lick Road) – Deer Lick	Northern/eastern terminus of KY 107
Logan	Lewisburg	16.855	27.125	US 431 north (North Main St.) – Central City, Drakesboro, Dunmor	Northern end of US 431 overlap
Logan	Lewisburg	17.549	28.242	KY 1040 south (Lost City Road)	Northern terminus of KY 1040
Logan	Lewisburg	18.807	30.267	KY 1153 north	Southern terminus of KY 1153
Logan		22.384	36.024	KY 3201 south (Copperstone-Quality Road)	Northern terminus of KY 3201
Logan		24.942	40.140	KY 2377 east (Anderson Store Road)	Western terminus of KY 2377
Butler	Quality	27.176	43.736	KY 1153 north to KY 626 east – Davis Crossroads, Hadley	Southern end of KY 1153 overlap
Butler	Quality	27.639	44.481	KY 1153 south	Northern end of KY 1153 overlap
Butler		30.736	49.465	KY 1187 east (Coal Road)	Western terminus of KY 1187
Butler		33.461	53.850	KY 949 west – Dunmor	Eastern terminus of KY 949
Butler	Huntsville	35.511	57.149	KY 70 (Rochester Road) – Drakesboro, Rochester, Morgantown	Eastern/Northern terminus
1.000 mi = 1.609 km; 1.000 km = 0.621 mi
