= Kentucky Route 171 =

State highway in Kentucky, United States

Kentucky Route 171
- KY 171 highlighted in red

Route information
- Maintained by KYTC
- Length: 28.702 mi (46.191 km)
- Existed: 1929–present

Major junctions
- South end: KY 106 near Elkton
- North end: US 62 in Greenville

Location
- Country: United States
- State: Kentucky
- Counties: Todd, Muhlenberg

Highway system
- Kentucky State Highway System; Interstate; US; State; Parkways
← KY 170	→ KY 172

Kentucky Route 171 (KY 171) is a 28.702-mile (46.191 km) state highway in Kentucky that runs from Kentucky Route 106 northeast of Elkton to U.S. Route 62 in southeast Greenville.

== Route description ==
KY 171 starts at a junction with KY 106 between Elkton and Claymour. It goes in a westerly path to intersect KY 181, and then turns north-northwest to Allegre where it intersects KY 507 (Pilot Rock Road)] It then goes further north to intersect KY 107 at Kirkmansville. The route then enters Muhlenberg County and traverses the community of Weir. It meets its end in the southern outskirts of Greenville at a junction with U.S. Route 62 (US 62).

== Major intersections ==
County	Location	mi	km	Destinations	Notes
Todd		0.000	0.000	KY 106 (Blue and Gray Park Road / Sharon Grove Road)	Southern terminus
Todd		1.639	2.638	KY 181 (Greenville Road)	
Todd		3.939	6.339	KY 508 west (Liberty-Britman Road)	Eastern terminus of KY 508
Todd	Allegre	7.542	12.138	KY 507 (Pilot Rock Road / Claymour-Russellville Road)	
Todd	Kirkmansville	13.749	22.127	KY 107 (Clifty-Kirkmansville Road)	
Muhlenberg		18.738	30.156	KY 831 east	Western terminus of KY 831
Muhlenberg		20.337	32.729	KY 853 west	Eastern terminus of KY 853
Muhlenberg		20.586	33.130	KY 600 south	Northern terminus of KY 600
Muhlenberg		25.778	41.486	KY 1473 south	Northern terminus of KY 1473
Muhlenberg	Greenville	28.702	46.191	US 62 (Hopkinsville Street)	Northern terminus
1.000 mi = 1.609 km; 1.000 km = 0.621 mi
