= Sharon Grove, Kentucky =

Unincorporated community in Kentucky, United States

Sharon Grove
- Unincorporated community
- Location within the state of Kentucky Sharon Grove (the United States)
- Coordinates: 36°54′48″N 87°5′51″W
- Country: United States
- State: Kentucky
- County: Todd
- Elevation: 643 ft (196 m)
- Time zone: UTC-6 (Central (CST))
  - Summer (DST): UTC-5 (CDT)
- ZIP codes: 42280
- GNIS feature ID: 503258

Sharon Grove is an unincorporated community located in Todd County, Kentucky, United States.

== History ==
At one time, the community was also known as Frog Level.

In 1974, the community's local chapter of the Lions Club, with some aid from the Pennyrile Area Development District and Army soldiers from Fort Campbell, were involved in a project to establish the Sharon Grove Community Park on Mount Sharon Road. It was built on a 12-acre plot of land that included a natural cave.

== Geography ==
Sharon Grove is located in the northeastern portion of Todd County just west of its border with Logan County. The community is located along Kentucky Route 106 about 8 miles (13 km) northeast of Elkton, and about 9 miles (14 km) southwest of Lewisburg.

== Education ==
Sharon Grove had an educational institution that operated as an all-grade school, which was converted solely into an elementary school in the late 1930s. Sharon Grove Elementary housed students in grades 1–8 until the end of the 1987–88 academic year.

Since 1988, students in the community currently attend the institutions of the Todd County Schools system. North Todd Elementary, located between Allegre and Claymour is the closest institution to the area; it is a feeder to Todd County Central Middle and High Schools in Elkton.

== Post office ==
Prior to 1996, Sharon Grove had a locally operated post office using ZIP code 42280.
