= Shanklin (disambiguation) =

Shanklin is a seaside resort town and civil parish on the Isle of Wight, England.

Shanklin may also refer to:

- Shanklin Estate, council housing estate in Sutton, South London; sited between Brighton Road and the Epsom Downs Branch
- Shanklin Glacier, a glacier in the Hughes Range of Antarctica, flowing southeast from Mount Waterman to enter Muck Glacier at a point 8 km (5 mi) west of Ramsey Glacier
- PS Shanklin, a ferry operating between the Isle of Wight and the mainland from 1924 to 1950
- TSMV Shanklin, a ferry operating between the Isle of Wight and the mainland from 1951 to 1980

== People ==
- Shanklin Family, American family involved in politics and government
- James Gordon Shanklin, American FBI agent and lawyer best known for his role in the investigation of the assassination of John F. Kennedy
- Paul Shanklin, American political satirist
- Ron Shanklin, American football player
- Tom Shanklin, Welsh rugby player
- Wayne Shanklin, American singer-songwriter

== See also ==
- Shanklin Chine, a wooded coastal ravine containing waterfalls, trees and lush vegetation, with footpaths and walkways allowing paid access for visitors, and a heritage centre explaining its history.
- Shanklin railway station, the railway station in the civil parish of Shanklin on the Isle of Wight
