= Todd County, Kentucky =

County in Kentucky, United States

- County
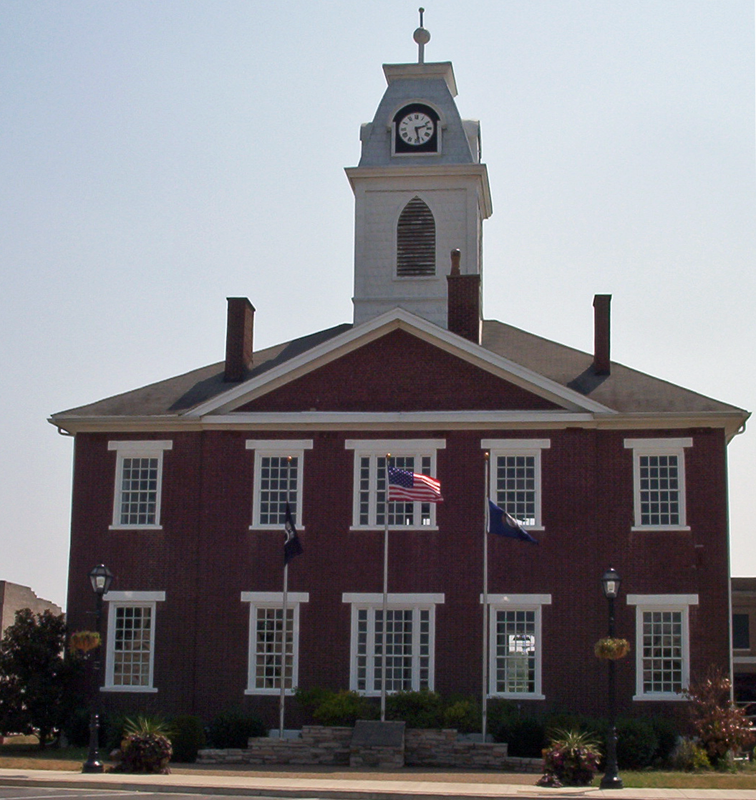
- Todd County Courthouse

- Location within the U.S. state of Kentucky
- Coordinates: 36°50′N 87°11′W
- Country: United States
- State: Kentucky
- Founded: 1820
- Named for: John Todd
- Seat: Elkton
- Largest city: Elkton

Government
  - Judge/Executive: Todd Mansfield (R)

Area
  - Total: 377 sq mi (980 km^{2})
  - Land: 374 sq mi (970 km^{2})
  - Water: 2.6 sq mi (6.7 km^{2}) 0.7%

Population (2020)
  - Total: 12,243
  - Estimate (2025): 12,972 ▲
  - Density: 34/sq mi (13/km^{2})
- Time zone: UTC−6 (Central)
  - Summer (DST): UTC−5 (CDT)
- Congressional district: 1st
- Website: toddcounty.ky.gov

Todd County is a county located in the U.S. state of Kentucky. As of the 2020 census, the population was 12,243. Its county seat is Elkton. The county is named for Colonel John Todd, who was killed at the Battle of Blue Licks in 1782 during the American Revolution.

== History ==
=== Early history ===
Todd County consists of two geographical regions known historically as the high country to the north and low country to the south. The northern highlands consist of steep-sloped sandstone terrain with forests of oak, walnut and poplar. The landscape contains steep bluffs and sharp rises and falls within the terrain. The southern lowlands consist of rolling limestone flatlands void of aquifer sinks and consist of dense but sparse forests of oak, walnut poplar and ash. The historic inhabitants of the region before European encounter were the Iroquoian language-speaking Cherokee, who had migrated centuries earlier from areas around the Great Lakes. They used the lands for hunting and gathering.

Todd County lies within what was originally considered the western portion of the Commonwealth of Virginia. Many of the original white settlers came when the area was still considered part of Virginia. This part of southern Kentucky was designated to be awarded to Virginia veterans of the American Revolutionary War as payment for their services.

Justinian Cartwright may have been the first settle in what is now Todd County. However, the first proven residents are Edward Shanklin Jr., Matthew and David Rolston, and John Huston and his sons James and Granville Huston. Samuel Davis, father of Jefferson Davis, and John Wilson were also early settlers of the county. Kentucky Governor Greenup made the first Kentucky land grants to veterans William Croghan, David Logan, Edward Shanklin Jr., and John Wilson, among others.

Todd County was created in response to a petition for "home government," since travel to the county seats of Logan and Christian was arduous. The petition had been written by the magisterial court, consisting of Edward Shanklin, John Gray, Robert Coleman, Henry Gorin, John Taylor, H. C. Ewing, John S Anderson, William Hopper, John Mann and Joseph Frazer, had made the request. The legislature of the Commonwealth of Kentucky accordingly passed an act creating of the county from portions of Christian and Logan counties on April 1, 1820. The new county was named for Colonel John Todd, who had been killed at the Battle of Blue Licks in 1782.

=== Development ===
Agriculture is a revered tradition in Todd County. The lowlands are of the finest rich soil types, including "Pembroke" soil. The lowlands are prized for their high growth yields. In the early 19th century, Major John Gray established a stagecoach hub in the county with travel routes radiating to larger American cities from the central point. His widely known Stagecoach Inn located in "Graysville," now Guthrie, Kentucky, was at the center of the travel routes. Major Gray's stagecoach empire was highly successful, and he soon became wealthy due to its popularity in the region. Major Gray built a house, a simple two-story shed-roofed, brick one-pile dwelling, now known as "Halcyon," or the John Gray House.

Gray wanted a town to be established near his home that would become the county seat. Gray designed the city, which included a town square from which hundreds of lots radiated. He called it "Elkton" after the elk herds that watered at a spring near the town center. Gray designed the town square as a trapezoid instead of a square, with the south side of the town square larger than the north so that as the sun traversed across the sky, the buildings on the east and west would benefit from prolonged periods of daily sunlight. Gray contributed funding for a county courthouse, which was erected at the center of the square. The brick building stood two stories with a cupola at the top.

After Major Gray died, the building was deemed in a state of ruin due to improper construction methods and torn down to erect a new courthouse. The new Todd County courthouse was erected by order of the Fiscal Court in 1834. R. Rowland designed the building in the Federal Style with an integration of Greek-Revival style motifs. The brick building, which is extant in the 21st century, stands two stories tall with tripartite windows and large Greek-Revival lintels. The building originally had a smaller federal style cupola, but this was later replaced with a late Victorian clock tower in the second Empire style, which remains today.

=== Civil War ===
Kentucky was a source of slaves for the cotton plantations in the lower South, and the slave trade was a profitable business for many Kentuckians. However, most Kentuckians did not own slaves. Those who did were wealthy plantation owners who stood to lose a lot if slavery were abolished. The major slave-owning areas in the state were the Bluegrass region, Henderson and Oldham counties on the Ohio River, and the western Kentucky counties of Trigg, Christian, Todd, and Warren. Many Kentuckians from these areas joined the Confederate army. Nevertheless, Kentucky's allegiance was divided during the Civil War. The state was officially neutral until September 1861, when it pledged its support to the Union. In response, a pro-Confederate Confederate government of Kentucky was formed by representatives from several Kentucky counties, with a second capital at Bowling Green.

== Geography ==
According to the U.S. Census Bureau, the county has a total area of 377 square miles (980 km^{2}), of which 374 square miles (970 km^{2}) is land and 2.6 square miles (6.7 km^{2}) (0.7%) is water.

=== Adjacent counties ===
- Muhlenberg County (north)
- Logan County (east)
- Robertson County, Tennessee (southeast)
- Montgomery County, Tennessee (southwest)
- Christian County (west)

== Demographics ==
Historical population
Census	Pop.	Note	%±
1830	8,680		—
1840	9,991		15.1%
1850	12,268		22.8%
1860	11,575		−5.6%
1870	12,612		9.0%
1880	15,994		26.8%
1890	16,814		5.1%
1900	17,371		3.3%
1910	16,488		−5.1%
1920	15,694		−4.8%
1930	13,520		−13.9%
1940	14,234		5.3%
1950	12,890		−9.4%
1960	11,364		−11.8%
1970	10,823		−4.8%
1980	11,874		9.7%
1990	10,940		−7.9%
2000	11,971		9.4%
2010	12,460		4.1%
2020	12,243		−1.7%
2025 (est.)	12,972	▲	6.0%
U.S. Decennial Census; 1790-1960 1900-90; 1990-2000 2010-20 2025

=== 2020 census ===
As of the 2020 census, the county had a population of 12,243. The median age was 37.7 years. 27.2% of residents were under the age of 18 and 16.0% of residents were 65 years of age or older. For every 100 females there were 97.6 males, and for every 100 females age 18 and over there were 96.2 males age 18 and over.

The racial makeup of the county was 84.6% White, 7.2% Black or African American, 0.4% American Indian and Alaska Native, 0.2% Asian, 0.0% Native Hawaiian and Pacific Islander, 2.9% from some other race, and 4.7% from two or more races. Hispanic or Latino residents of any race comprised 4.9% of the population.

0.0% of residents lived in urban areas, while 100.0% lived in rural areas.

There were 4,566 households in the county, of which 34.0% had children under the age of 18 living with them and 26.0% had a female householder with no spouse or partner present. About 26.3% of all households were made up of individuals and 12.7% had someone living alone who was 65 years of age or older.

There were 5,117 housing units, of which 10.8% were vacant. Among occupied housing units, 70.0% were owner-occupied and 30.0% were renter-occupied. The homeowner vacancy rate was 0.7% and the rental vacancy rate was 7.2%.

=== 2000 census ===
As of the census of 2000, there were 11,971 people, 4,569 households, and 3,367 families residing in the county. The population density was 32 per square mile (12/km^{2}). There were 5,121 housing units at an average density of 14 per square mile (5.4/km^{2}). The racial makeup of the county was 89.32% White, 8.75% Black or African American, 0.15% Native American, 0.17% Asian, 0.03% Pacific Islander, 0.87% from other races, and 0.71% from two or more races. 1.66% of the population were Hispanic or Latino of any race.

There were 4,569 households, out of which 33.50% had children under the age of 18 living with them, 58.70% were married couples living together, 11.60% had a female householder with no husband present, and 26.30% were non-families. 23.00% of all households were made up of individuals, and 11.10% had someone living alone who was 65 years of age or older. The average household size was 2.59 and the average family size was 3.05.

In the county, the population was spread out, with 26.60% under the age of 18, 8.70% from 18 to 24, 28.40% from 25 to 44, 22.40% from 45 to 64, and 14.00% who were 65 years of age or older. The median age was 36 years. For every 100 females there were 94.80 males. For every 100 females age 18 and over, there were 92.70 males.

The median income for a household in the county was $29,718, and the median income for a family was $36,043. Males had a median income of $28,502 versus $20,340 for females. The per capita income for the county was $15,462. About 14.70% of families and 17.20% of the population were below the poverty line, including 21.90% of those under age 18 and 22.00% of those age 65 or over.

== Attractions ==
- Green River Female Academy
- Milliken Memorial Community House
- Old Oaks Farm
- Old Todd County Courthouse
- Jefferson Davis State Historic Site
- Robert Penn Warren Birthplace
- Glover's Cave
- Liberty Hall
- Edwards Hall
- John Gray House, "Halcyon"
- Northington
- Sunny Side Acres
- Pilot Rock
- Holly Hills
- Runnymede
- Guthrie Transportation Museum

== Communities ==
=== Cities ===
- Elkton (county seat)
- Guthrie
- Trenton

=== Census-designated places ===
- Allensville
- Fairview (mostly in Christian County)

=== Other unincorporated communities ===
- Allegre
- Claymour
- Clifty
- Daysville
- Hadensville
- Kirkmansville
- Pea Ridge
- Penicktown
- Pinchem
- Sharon Grove
- Tiny Town
- Tress Shop
- Tyewhoppety

== Education ==
There is one school district, the Todd County School District. The District includes the Todd County Central High School.

== Notable residents ==
- George Street Boone, liberal constitutional scholar
- Francis Marion Bristow, Congressman and lawyer
- Benjamin Bristow, first Solicitor General of the United States and a former U.S. Treasury Secretary
- Mary Louise Milliken Childs, American philanthropist
- Jefferson Davis, President of the Confederacy
- Dorothy Dix (Elizabeth Merriwether Gilmer), columnist
- Caroline Meriwether Goodlett, co-founder of the United Daughters of the Confederacy
- Caroline Gordon, author of nine novels
- Kent Greenfield, American major league baseball player
- James Clark McReynolds, former Associate Justice of the United States Supreme Court
- Roger Q. Mills, former Texas U.S. Senator (1892–1899)
- Paul Rudolph, architect
- Edward Shanklin Sr., Revolutionary War soldier and county founding father
- James Gordon Shanklin, FBI Agent
- Jess Sweetser, first American-born golfer to win the British Amateur
- David S. Terry, California jurist and politician
- Robert Penn Warren, first poet laureate of the United States

== Politics ==
United States presidential election results for Todd County, Kentucky
Year	Republican		Democratic		Third party(ies)	
Year	No.	%	No.	%	No.	%
1912	1,435	45.33%	1,482	46.81%	249	7.86%
1916	1,671	44.19%	2,051	54.24%	59	1.56%
1920	2,663	44.31%	3,292	54.78%	55	0.92%
1924	1,942	41.50%	2,679	57.24%	59	1.26%
1928	2,496	50.78%	2,416	49.16%	3	0.06%
1932	1,562	28.11%	3,966	71.38%	28	0.50%
1936	1,178	28.21%	2,987	71.53%	11	0.26%
1940	1,436	29.97%	3,337	69.64%	19	0.40%
1944	1,363	31.16%	2,990	68.36%	21	0.48%
1948	827	20.45%	2,929	72.43%	288	7.12%
1952	1,401	31.73%	2,995	67.82%	20	0.45%
1956	1,480	32.28%	3,087	67.33%	18	0.39%
1960	1,846	39.50%	2,827	60.50%	0	0.00%
1964	1,339	32.73%	2,738	66.93%	14	0.34%
1968	1,433	31.99%	1,082	24.16%	1,964	43.85%
1972	1,964	59.25%	1,222	36.86%	129	3.89%
1976	1,095	30.44%	2,436	67.72%	66	1.83%
1980	1,945	48.86%	1,956	49.13%	80	2.01%
1984	2,364	55.23%	1,505	35.16%	411	9.60%
1988	2,282	57.66%	1,632	41.23%	44	1.11%
1992	1,691	40.24%	1,858	44.22%	653	15.54%
1996	1,912	46.43%	1,744	42.35%	462	11.22%
2000	2,646	63.20%	1,496	35.73%	45	1.07%
2004	3,242	68.20%	1,491	31.36%	21	0.44%
2008	3,336	67.52%	1,543	31.23%	62	1.25%
2012	3,247	68.82%	1,403	29.74%	68	1.44%
2016	3,612	75.58%	1,042	21.80%	125	2.62%
2020	4,062	75.74%	1,205	22.47%	96	1.79%
2024	4,009	78.42%	1,051	20.56%	52	1.02%

=== Elected officials ===
Elected officials as of January 3, 2025
U.S. House	James Comer (R)	KY 1
Ky. Senate	Mike Wilson (R)	32
Ky. House	Jason Petrie (R)	16

== See also ==
- National Register of Historic Places listings in Todd County, Kentucky
