= Joy Bale Boone =

American poet (1912–2002)

- Born: October 29, 1912; Chicago, Illinois, U.S.
- Died: October 1, 2002 (aged 89); Glasgow, Kentucky, U.S.
- Occupation: poet

Joy Bale Boone (October 29, 1912 – October 3, 2002) was an American poet best known for her devotion to the arts. She was also active in the women's liberation movement throughout her life. Although she was born in Chicago, Illinois Boone spent most of her life in Kentucky.

== Life and career ==
Boone became interested in poetry at a very young age. As a young girl, she attended the Chicago Latin School and then went on to Roycemore School for girls. Boone received inspiration as a young girl from poet Harriet Monroe, who lived just a few blocks away from her as a child. Bale Boone came to Kentucky to begin her career in writing after she met her husband, Shelby Garnett Bale. The two met in Chicago while Garnett Bale was attending medical school at Northwestern University. They were married in 1934. In the first few years of their marriage, the couple lived in both New York and Louisville while Garnett Bale finished his residencies.

In 1944, Boone formed the League of Women Voters in Hardin County, Kentucky. and served as its first president. Bale Boone's first job in Kentucky came in 1945 as a book reviewer for the Louisville Courier-Journal. In 1964, Boone went on to found the literary magazine Approaches. She held the position of editor of the magazine until 1975. She was also the editor for the 1964 and 1967 Contemporary Poetry collections. Bale Boone has had many individual poems published, but her most significant work was The Storm's Eye: A Narrative in Verse Celebrating Cassius Marcellus Clay, Man of Freedom 1810–1903. Her two collections of poetry include: Never Less Than Love (1972) and Even Without Love (1992). Boone received the Distinguished Kentuckian Award from KET in 1974. She also received the Sullivan Award from the University of Kentucky in 1969. Finally, in 1997, Boone was honored by being named the Poet Laureate of Kentucky.

Boone spent most her life in Elizabethtown, Kentucky with her first husband, physician Shelby Garnett Bale. The couple had four sons and two daughters. Shelby Garnett Bale (Senior) died in 1972. In 1975, Boone married George Street Boone of Elkton. After marrying, she spent many years residing in Elkton, Kentucky where she continued to write and actively serve the state of Kentucky through the arts.

After suffering from an illness for some time, Boone died in Glasgow, Kentucky on Tuesday, October 3, 2002, at the age of 89.

== The arts ==
Boone dedicated her life to the arts. Throughout her life, she served on numerous committees and boards in hopes that more people would have the opportunity to experience the arts in the way that she had. She served as President of the Friends of Kentucky Libraries; in this role, she spearheaded the creation of the bookmobile, which is still used today to deliver books to those who are unable to come to the library. She served on many other boards and committees, these include: the Kentucky Educational Television Advisory Board, Kentucky Council on Higher Education (now the Kentucky Council on Postsecondary Education), Editorial Board of the University Press of Kentucky, the Kentucky Humanities Council, chair of the Robert Penn Warren Committee at Western Kentucky University, board member the Robert Penn Warren Circle at Duke University, director of the Thomas Clark Foundation of the University Press of Kentucky, and the Gaines Center for the Humanities at the University of Kentucky.
