= Jason Petrie =

American politician (born 1971)

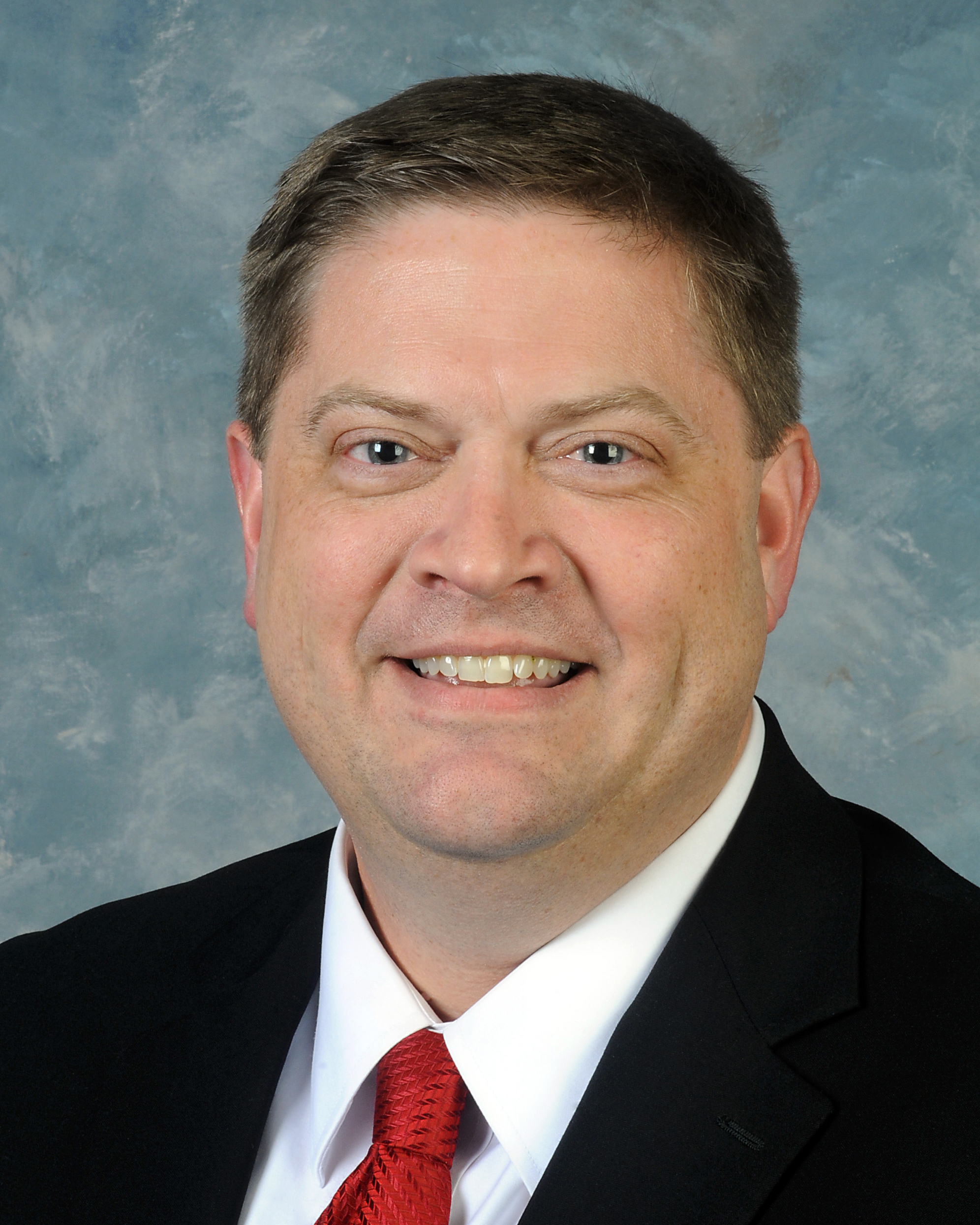
- Official portrait, 2016

Member of the Kentucky House of Representatives from the 16th district
- Incumbent
- Assumed office January 1, 2017
- Preceded by: Martha Jane King

Personal details
- Born: February 27, 1971 (age 55) Hopkinsville, Kentucky
- Party: Republican
- Education: Berea College (BA) Western Kentucky University (MA) Ohio State University (JD)
- Committees: Appropriations and Revenue (Chair); Judiciary; Capital Projects and Bond Oversight; Public Pension Oversight Board

Jason Kelly Petrie (born February 27, 1971) is an American politician who has served as a Republican member of the Kentucky House of Representatives since January 2017. His represents Kentucky's 16th House district, which includes Logan and Todd counties as well as part of Christian County. Currently, Petrie serves as chair of the House Standing Committee on Appropriates and Revenue.

== Background ==
Petrie grew up on a farm in Clifty, Kentucky. He graduated from Todd County High School 1989 before going on to earn a Bachelor of Arts in economics and philosophy from Berea College in 1993, a Master of Arts degree in humanities from Western Kentucky University in 1995, and a Juris Doctor from the Ohio State University Moritz College of Law in 1998.

After passing the state and federal bar exams, Petrie started his own private practice while also serving as a victims advocate and assistant Commonwealth Attorney. Today he continues to operate his own private practice in Elkton, Kentucky, and serves cases in Logan, Todd, Warren, Christian and Muhlenberg counties.

== Political career ==
=== Elections ===
- 2014 Petrie initially filed to run for the 7th District Court election, but withdrew to run as an independent candidate for Kentucky's 6th House district against Democratic incumbent Martha Jane King. Petrie garnered 4,632 votes (40.6%), but was defeated by King.
- 2016 Petrie won the 2016 Republican primary against Amy Brooks, winning with 840 votes (63%), and won the 2016 Kentucky House of Representatives election against Democratic incumbent Martha Jane King, winning with 10,938 votes (65.4%).
- 2018 Petrie was unopposed in both the 2018 Republican primary and the 2018 Kentucky House of Representatives election, winning with 10,041 votes.
- 2020 Petrie was unopposed in both the 2020 Republican primary and the 2020 Kentucky House of Representatives election, winning with 15,585 votes.
- 2022 Petrie was unopposed in both the 2022 Republican primary and the 2022 Kentucky House of Representatives election, winning with 10,847 votes.
- 2024 Petrie was unopposed in both the 2024 Republican primary and the 2024 Kentucky House of Representatives election, winning the latter with 16,503 votes.
