= George Street Boone =

American politician

Member of the Kentucky House of Representatives from the 16th district
- In office January 1, 1972 – January 1, 1974
- Preceded by: Homer B. Dorris
- Succeeded by: Lewis Foster

Personal details
- Born: April 27, 1918 Elkton, Kentucky, U.S.
- Died: November 22, 2004 (aged 86) Elkton, Kentucky, U.S.
- Party: Democratic
- Spouse: Joy Bale Boone (m. 1975)
- Parent: B. E. Boone (father)
- Profession: Politician, scholar, lawyer

Military service
- Allegiance: United States
- Branch/service: United States Navy
- Battles/wars: World War II

George Street Boone (April 27, 1918 – November 22, 2004) was an American constitutional scholar and former Kentucky legislator who served on the 1987 U.S. Constitution Bicentennial Review Commission.

== Career in public service ==
Boone served in the Navy during World War II. A native and resident of Elkton, Kentucky, he was subsequently a member of numerous ethics review boards. As a freshman state legislator of the Kentucky House of Representatives in 1972, he was an influential member of a group referred to as "The Young Turks."

The small group of liberal representatives, outraged over Richard Nixon's presidency and the stern administration of then-Governor Wendell Ford, would gather over martinis in Boone's Frankfort hotel room to discuss the day's legislative sessions.

Boone became counsel to the new Legislative Board of Ethics, created by the 1972 Kentucky General Assembly, initially taking the job without pay. He was also a member of the Legislative Research Commission in the 1970s. He served on two different groups aimed at constitutional revision—the 1987 Commission on Constitutional Review, formed in commemoration of the 200th anniversary of the ratification of the U.S. Constitution, as well as a two-decades-earlier 50-member group which wrote, but failed to have adopted, a proposed new Constitution in 1966. Boone lost his bid for re-election to the Kentucky Legislature in 1973 and never served another term.

Boone owned and operated a law firm in Elkton, Kentucky. He resided at his family's home "Halcyon," also known as the John Gray House, a transitional Federal and Greek Revival mansion in downtown Elkton. Boone served in many organizations in his community, including the Milliken Memorial Community House Board of Directors.

== Death ==
After visiting with his wife, Kentucky poet laureate Joy Bale Boone, George Street Boone was injured in an automobile accident which affected his mental capabilities and forced him into a nursing home. He died after a long illness at the age of 86. In his will, he left over a million dollars to the Milliken Memorial Community House and the Todd County Public Library.
