= Tiny Town, Kentucky =

Unincorporated community in Kentucky, United States

Tiny Town
- Unincorporated community
- Location within the state of Kentucky Tiny Town (the United States)
- Coordinates: 36°38′46″N 87°11′59″W
- Country: United States
- State: Kentucky
- County: Todd
- Elevation: 551 ft (168 m)
- Time zone: UTC-6 (Central (CST))
  - Summer (DST): UTC-5 (CDT)
- GNIS feature ID: 2743148

Tiny Town is an unincorporated community located in Todd County, Kentucky, United States. It was also known as Breeze Inn and Grays Station.

== Geography ==
Tiny Town is located on the southern edge of Todd County near the Tennessee state line. U.S. Routes 41 and 79 are the primary routes to and from the community. Kentucky Route 181 connects northward to the Todd County seat, Elkton.

== Nearby cities ==
- Guthrie, Kentucky
- Trenton, Kentucky
- Clarksville, Tennessee
