= Quality, Kentucky =

Unincorporated community in Kentucky, United States

Quality
- Unincorporated community
- Location within the state of Kentucky Quality (the United States)
- Coordinates: 37°4′32″N 86°50′48″W
- Country: United States
- State: Kentucky
- County: Butler
- Elevation: 502 ft (153 m)
- Time zone: UTC-6 (Central (CST))
  - Summer (DST): UTC-5 (CDT)
- ZIP codes: 42268
- GNIS feature ID: 508888

Quality is an unincorporated community located in Butler County, Kentucky, United States.

Quality has been noted for its unusual place name.

== Geography ==
Quality is located in the southwestern portion of Butler County just north of the Logan County line. The community is located around the junction of Kentucky State Routes 106 and 1153. The community is located about 9 miles (14 km) south of Rochester, and 11 miles (18 km) northeast of Lewisburg.

== Post office ==
The community's post office operated from 1853 to 1995. It originally operated with zip code 42268.

== Notable person ==
- Staff Sergeant Don J. Jenkins, Medal of Honor recipient for his service during the Vietnam War
