= Shanklin family =

In the United States, the phrase Shanklin Family commonly refers to the family descending from Gilbert Shankland of Enniskillen, Ireland. The Shanklin family in the United States were planters in Augusta County, Virginia, (now Rockingham County) and later in Jessamine County and Todd County, Kentucky and were involved in American politics and government.

== First generations in the United States ==
Robert Shankland (1726–1796) traveled to America using university tuition given to him by his father Robert Shankland Sr. in 1747. Robert's brother Edward I (1700–1769) also came to the United States during this time period. Edward Shankland I changed the family name to Shanklin. Edward I settled in the area known as Augusta County, Virginia. Edward's brother Thomas Shanklin (1690–1774) is reputed to be the inspiration for the scout in James Fenimore Cooper's The Last Of The Mohicans. Later this region of settlement was named Rockingham County, Virginia. Edward's son, Edward II (1740–1806) was a supplier and soldier in the American Revolutionary War. Edward II was granted several hundred acres in the Virginia Territory of southern Kentucky in addition to also having one of the largest plantation land holdings in Rockingham County, Virginia.

== First generations in Kentucky ==
Edward Shanklin III (1765–1826) was one of the first pioneers of Todd County, Kentucky, what was then Christian County, Kentucky. Edward Shanklin III was given over 900 acres (3.6 km^{2}) in land grants by Kentucky Governor Greenup. Edward III married Elizabeth Huston, having over 13 children. Edward's son Edward IV (1795–1843) married Mary Peggy Trover (b:abt 1800). Edward III and Elizabeth were the grandparents of Edward Shanklin Stuart the son of Elizabeth H Shanklin and Samuel Stuart. Edward Stuart married Jennie Vaughn and founded Jennie Stuart Hospital in Hopkinsville, Kentucky in her memory. Dr. Edward Stuart states as documented in the "History of Jennie Stuart Hospital" that his maternal grandmother Mary Shanklin was the midwife in the delivery of Confederate President Jefferson Davis born in 1808.

John Robert Shanklin (1754–1817) immigrated to Jessamine County, Kentucky in 1800. John Robert Shanklin married Mary Magdaline Sea, known as "Polly," having two children, one of which became Kentucky's Commonwealth Attorney, twice a State Representative, and a United States Congressman George Sea Shanklin. George Sea Shanklin's son, Elliot West Shanklin married Maltha Bryan, daughter of Joseph Bryan, builder of Waveland in Lexington, Kentucky.

== Antebellum and late 19th and 20th century generations in Todd County, Kentucky ==
Edward Shanklin IV's son John Edward Shanklin served as a Confederate Cavalryman in the American Civil War in the 15th Kentucky Cavalry, known at the time as Woodward's 2nd D Cavalry. John Edward enlisted on October 25, 1861. He was injured in service and was reassigned in 1863 as a regimental ordnance teamster in charge of transporting army munitions. John Edward surrendered in Washington, Georgia in 1865. John Edward married Georgia Ann after the American Civil War, having 10 children.

William Sinclair Shanklin, John Edward and Georgia Ann's son, was elected in 1937 to Kentucky legislation in the Democratic Party, the party that the Shanklin Family has associated with since the party's inception, and served one term in office, not seeking re-election. William and his brother John E. Shanklin partnered in the buying, selling, and trading of land during the American Great Depression. The Shanklin family amassed several thousand acres in the southern portion of Todd County to amounts over 6,000 acres (24 km^{2}) during the height of their farming operations. The remainder of the Shanklin family land holdings still exist near Elkton, Kentucky.

== Family members ==
- William Sinclair Shanklin's son, James Gordon Shanklin (1909–1988), was special agent in charge of the Dallas, Texas FBI, where he presided over the John F. Kennedy assassination investigation. The Dallas FBI building is now named in his honor.
- William Arnold Shanklin (1862–1924) served as president of Wesleyan University from 1909 to 1923.
- John A. Shanklin Served as Mayor of Charleston, West Virginia from 1959 to 1967.
- John G. Shanklin, Indiana Secretary of State from 1879 to 1881.
- Lieutenant Roy E. Shanklin (1919–1945) led the first B-29 raid on Tokyo on November 24, 1944. He received the Distinguished Flying Cross, Air Medal with Four Oak Leaf Clusters, and Purple Heart.
- Colonel John Henderson Shanklin (1824–1904) was a trial lawyer in the case against Frank James of the Jesse James Gang.
- George Sea Shanklin served in the United States Congress 1865–76 and served as Kentucky's Commonwealth Attorney in 1854.
- O'Dell Martin, Musician
- Lieutenant Andrew Shanklin (1760–1810) fought in the American Revolutionary War
- Lieutenant Robert Shanklin (1750–1802) fought in the American Revolutionary War
- Captain Samuel Shanklin (1770–1850) fought in the War of 1812

== Resources ==
- Perrin's History of Christian & Todd Counties - 1884
- Todd County Family History, Volume II
- History of Rockingham County's Early Settlers
- A history of the Shankland Family
