= June Lyne =

American politician (1931–2019)

Member of the Kentucky House of Representatives from the 16th district
- In office January 1, 1985 – January 1, 1995
- Preceded by: Lewis Foster
- Succeeded by: Sheldon Baugh

Personal details
- Born: September 28, 1931
- Died: August 28, 2019 (aged 87)
- Party: Democratic

June Lyne (née Dawson; September 28, 1931 – August 28, 2019) was an American politician from Kentucky who was a member of the Kentucky House of Representatives from 1985 to 1995. Lyne was first elected in 1984. She did not seek reelection in 1994 and was succeeded by Republican Sheldon Baugh.

She died in August 2019 at age 87.
