= William A. Shanklin =

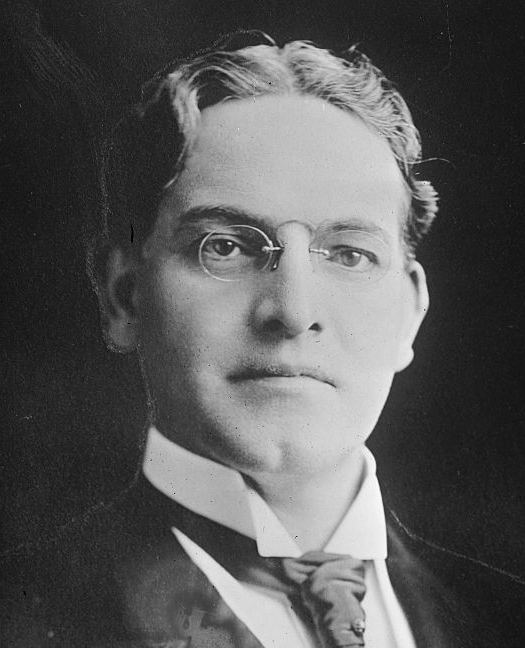

President of Wesleyan University
- In office June 1909 – 1923
- Preceded by: Bradford Paul Raymond
- Succeeded by: Stephen Henry Olin

Personal details
- Born: April 18, 1862 Carrollton, Missouri, U.S.
- Died: October 6, 1924 (aged 62) New York City, New York, U.S.
- Spouse: Emma Elizabeth Brant (m. 1891)
- Children: 3

William Arnold Shanklin (April 18, 1862 – October 6, 1924) was a Methodist minister and an American university president.

== Early life ==
William Arnold Shanklin, a member of the prominent Shanklin Family, was born at Carrollton, Missouri on April 18, 1862. He was the son of Wesley Dunscombe Shanklin and Lockie Ann (née Arnold) Shanklin. His younger brother, Arnold Shanklin, served as consul general of the United States at Panama beginning in 1905.

Shanklin was educated at public schools in Missouri before attending Hamilton College (A.B., 1883) and at Garrett Biblical Institute (S.T.B., 1891).

== Career ==
Before entering the ministry, Shanklin spent four years "engaged in mercantile pursuits" in Chetopa, Kansas. After graduating from Garrett Biblical Institute in 1891, Shanklin was ordained to the Methodist Episcopal ministry and held pastorates in Kansas, in Spokane and Seattle, in Washington, in Dubuque, Iowa, and in Reading, Pennsylvania.

In 1905, he was elected president of Upper Iowa University, which was founded in 1857, and served as president from 1905 until 1909. In 1908, he was elected to succeed Bradford P. Raymond as the ninth president of Wesleyan University in Middletown, Connecticut beginning in June 1909. He received many honorary degrees, including a D.D. from the University of Washington in 1895, and an LL.D. from Baker University in 1906.

== Personal life ==
On October 13, 1891, Shanklin was married to Emma Elizabeth Brant (1869–1947), the daughter of Jefferson Emery Brant and Mary Ann (née McAllister) Brant, at Fort Scott, Kansas. Together, they were the parents of three children:

- Mary Arnold Shanklin
- William Arnold Shanklin Jr.
- Anna Shanklin

Shanklin died in New York City on October 6, 1924. He was buried at Rose Hill Cemetery in Bloomington, Indiana.
