= Sheldon Baugh =

American politician (1943–2023)

Member of the Kentucky House of Representatives from the 16th district
- In office January 1, 1995 – January 1, 2009
- Preceded by: June Lyne
- Succeeded by: Martha Jane King

Personal details
- Born: June 9, 1943
- Died: September 17, 2023 (aged 80)
- Party: Republican

Sheldon Earl Baugh (June 9, 1943 – September 17, 2023) was an American politician from Kentucky who was a member of the Kentucky House of Representatives from 1995 to 2009. Baugh was first elected in 1994 after incumbent representative June Lyne retired. He did not seek reelection in 2008 and was succeeded by Democrat Martha Jane King.

He died in September 2023 at age 80.
