= Martha Jane King =

American politician

Member of the Kentucky House of Representatives from the 16th district
- In office January 1, 2009 – January 1, 2017
- Preceded by: Sheldon Baugh
- Succeeded by: Jason Petrie

Personal details
- Born: April 13, 1955 (age 71)
- Party: Democratic

Martha Jane King (born April 13, 1955) is an American politician from Kentucky who was a member of the Kentucky House of Representatives from 2009 to 2017. King was first elected in 2008 after incumbent representative Sheldon Baugh retired. She was defeated for reelection by Republican Jason Petrie in 2016.
