= Daysville, Kentucky =

Daysville
- Unincorporated community
- Location within the state of Kentucky
- Coordinates: 36°48′8.15″N 87°4′1.00″W
- Country: United States
- State: Kentucky
- County: Todd
- Elevation: 643 ft (196 m)
- Time zone: UTC-6 (Central (CST))
  - Summer (DST): UTC-5 (CST)
- Area codes: 270 and 364
- GNIS feature ID: 490707

Daysville is an unincorporated community in Todd County, Kentucky, United States.

== Geography ==
Daysville is located in the east-central portion of Todd County along Kentucky Route 1309 just south of the concurrently running U.S. Route 68 and Kentucky Route 80 near the Logan County line.
