= Don J. Jenkins =

United States Army Medal of Honor recipient

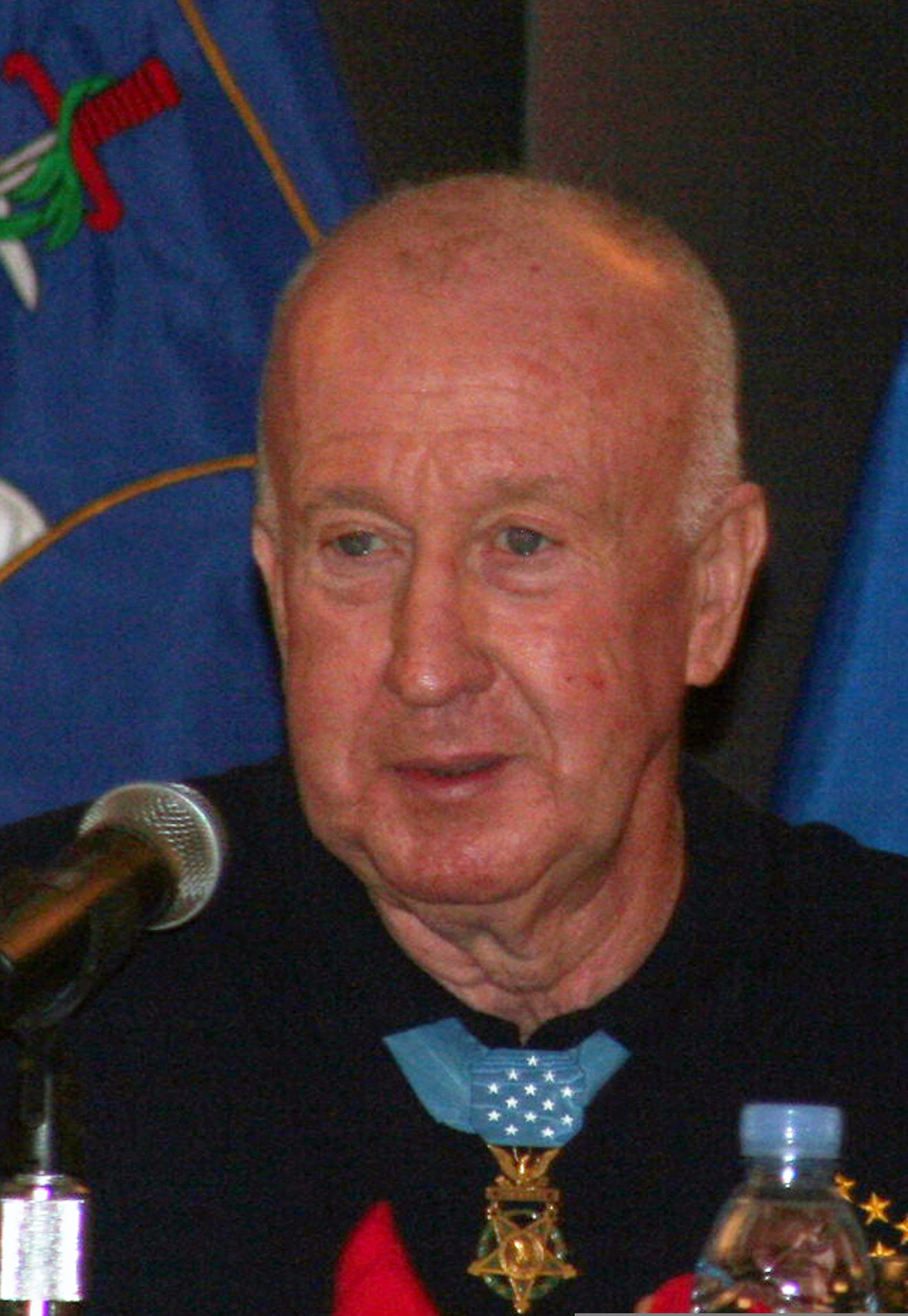
- Jenkins in 2010
- Born: April 18, 1948 (age 78); Quality, Kentucky, U.S.
- Military career
- Allegiance: United States
- Branch: United States Army
- Rank: Staff Sergeant
- Units: Company A, 2d Battalion, 39th Infantry Regiment
- Conflicts: Vietnam War
- Awards: Medal of Honor; Distinguished Service Cross; Silver Star; Bronze Star Medal; Purple Heart

Donald J. Jenkins (born April 18, 1948) is a former United States Army soldier and a recipient of the United States military's highest decoration, the Medal of Honor, for his actions in the Vietnam War.

== Military career ==
Jenkins joined the United States Army from Nashville, Tennessee, and by January 6, 1969, was serving as a private first class in Alpha Company, 2d Battalion, 39th Infantry Regiment, 9th Infantry Division. During a firefight on that day, in Kien Phong Province, Republic of Vietnam, Jenkins repeatedly exposed himself to hostile fire to engage the enemy, resupply his ammunition, and obtain new weapons. Despite being wounded himself, he made several trips through intense fire to rescue other wounded soldiers. For his actions during the battle Jenkins was promoted to staff sergeant and awarded the Medal of Honor in March 1971.

== Medal of Honor citation ==
Staff Sergeant Jenkins official Medal of Honor citation reads:

For conspicuous gallantry and intrepidity in action at the risk of his life above and beyond the call of duty. Staff Sergeant Jenkins (then Private First Class.), Alpha Company, distinguished himself while serving as a machine gunner on a reconnaissance mission. When his company came under heavy crossfire from an enemy complex, Staff Sergeant Jenkins unhesitatingly maneuvered forward to a perilously exposed position and began placing suppressive fire on the enemy. When his own machine gun jammed, he immediately obtained a rifle and continued to fire into the enemy bunkers until his machine gun was made operative by his assistant. He exposed himself to extremely heavy fire when he repeatedly both ran and crawled across open terrain to obtain resupplies of ammunition until he had exhausted all that was available for his machine gun. Displaying tremendous presence of mind, he then armed himself with 2 antitank weapons and, by himself, maneuvered through the hostile fusillade to within 20 meters of an enemy bunker to destroy that position. After moving back to the friendly defensive perimeter long enough to secure yet another weapon, a grenade launcher, Staff Sergeant Jenkins moved forward to a position providing no protection and resumed placing accurate fire on the enemy until his ammunition was again exhausted. During this time he was seriously wounded by shrapnel. Undaunted and displaying great courage, he moved forward 100 meters to aid a friendly element that was pinned down only a few meters from the enemy. This he did with complete disregard for his own wound and despite having been advised that several previous rescue attempts had failed at the cost of the life of 1 and the wounding of others. Ignoring the continuing intense fire and his painful wounds, and hindered by darkness, he made 3 trips to the beleaguered unit, each time pulling a wounded comrade back to safety. Staff Sergeant Jenkins' extraordinary valor, dedication, and indomitable spirit inspired his fellow soldiers to repulse the determined enemy attack and ultimately to defeat the larger force. Staff Sergeant Jenkins risk of his life reflect great credit upon himself, his unit, and the U.S. Army.

== See also ==
- List of Medal of Honor recipients for the Vietnam War
