= Kentucky's 16th House of Representatives district =

American legislative district

Kentucky's 16th State House of Representatives district
Representative
Jason Petrie; R–Elkton
since January 1, 2017
- Registration: 46.7% Republican; 44.2% Democratic; 8.6% No party preference
- Demographics: 87.2% White; 5.2% Black; 3.7% Hispanic; 0.3% Asian; 0.1% Native American; 0.3% Other; 3.2% Multiracial
- Population (2023): 44,186
- Registered voters (2025): 31,214

Kentucky's 16th House of Representatives district is one of 100 districts in the Kentucky House of Representatives. Located in the western part of the state, it comprises the counties of Logan, Todd, and part of Christian. It has been represented by Jason Petrie (R–Elkton) since 2017. As of 2023, the district had a population of 44,186.

== Voter registration ==
On January 1, 2025, the district had 31,214 registered voters, who were registered with the following parties.

Party	Registration	
Party	Voters	%
Republican	14,562	46.65
Democratic	13,795	44.19
Independent	1,093	3.50
Libertarian	150	0.48
Green	14	0.04
Constitution	14	0.04
Socialist Workers	2	0.01
Reform	1	0.00
"Other"	1,583	5.07
Total	31,214	100.00
Source: Kentucky State Board of Elections

== List of members representing the district ==
Member	Party	Years	Electoral history	District location
June Lyne (Olmstead)	Democratic	January 1, 1985 – January 1, 1995	Elected in 1984. Reelected in 1986. Reelected in 1988. Reelected in 1990. Reelected in 1992. Retired.	1985–1993; Logan and Todd Counties.
June Lyne (Olmstead)	Democratic	January 1, 1985 – January 1, 1995	Elected in 1984. Reelected in 1986. Reelected in 1988. Reelected in 1990. Reelected in 1992. Retired.	1993–1997; Logan and Todd Counties.
Sheldon Baugh (Russellville)	Republican	January 1, 1995 – January 1, 2009	Elected in 1994. Reelected in 1996. Reelected in 1998. Reelected in 2000. Reelected in 2002. Reelected in 2004. Reelected in 2006. Retired.	1993–1997; Logan and Todd Counties.
Sheldon Baugh (Russellville)	Republican	January 1, 1995 – January 1, 2009	Elected in 1994. Reelected in 1996. Reelected in 1998. Reelected in 2000. Reelected in 2002. Reelected in 2004. Reelected in 2006. Retired.	1997–2003
Sheldon Baugh (Russellville)	Republican	January 1, 1995 – January 1, 2009	Elected in 1994. Reelected in 1996. Reelected in 1998. Reelected in 2000. Reelected in 2002. Reelected in 2004. Reelected in 2006. Retired.	2003–2015
Martha Jane King (Lewisburg)	Democratic	January 1, 2009 – January 1, 2017	Elected in 2008. Reelected in 2010. Reelected in 2012. Reelected in 2014. Lost reelection.	2003–2015
Martha Jane King (Lewisburg)	Democratic	January 1, 2009 – January 1, 2017	Elected in 2008. Reelected in 2010. Reelected in 2012. Reelected in 2014. Lost reelection.	2015–2023
Jason Petrie (Elkton)	Republican	January 1, 2017 – present	Elected in 2016. Reelected in 2018. Reelected in 2020. Reelected in 2022. Reelected in 2024. Reelected in 2026.	2015–2023
Jason Petrie (Elkton)	Republican	January 1, 2017 – present	Elected in 2016. Reelected in 2018. Reelected in 2020. Reelected in 2022. Reelected in 2024. Reelected in 2026.	2023–present
