= Robert J. Kabel =

American lawyer

Chair of District of Columbia Republican Party
- In office December 2004 – January 2013

Chair of Log Cabin Republicans

Member of the Presidential Advisory Council on HIV/AIDS
- President: George W. Bush

Personal details
- Occupation: Lawyer

Robert J. Kabel is an American lawyer. He is a Republican attorney, lobbyist, and former National Committeeman of the District of Columbia Republican Committee. In this capacity, he was a member of the Republican National Committee. Previously, he was Chairman of the D.C. Republican Committee from December 2004 through January 2013.

Kabel served on the Presidential Advisory Council on HIV/AIDS and its International Committee during the George W. Bush administration He has also been involved with the Whitman-Walker Clinic, where he was a fundraiser.

He has been involved in Republican politics throughout his career; during the presidency of Ronald Reagan, Kabel served for three years as Special Assistant to President Reagan for Legislative Affairs. He is a former Legislative Director for Senator Richard Lugar (R-IN) and former Legislative Assistant to Senator Paul Fannin (R-AZ). He also served as a part-time member of the Foreign Claims Settlement Commission.

Kabel was the chairman of the Log Cabin Republicans from 1993 to 1999 and 2014–2016. He also served as chairman of the Liberty Education Forum, which is the think-tank arm of the Log Cabin Republicans. From 2000 to 2004, Kabel was vice chairman of the District of Columbia Republican Committee. He led the party to write its first platform, which explicitly opposed a federal constitutional amendment to ban same-sex marriage, the only state-level Republican Party to do so. In December 2004 he was voted the chairman, becoming the first openly gay chair of a state-level Republican Committee.

In 2016, Kabel published a memoir, Inside and Out: the Odyssey of a Gay Conservative.
