= Todd County Central High School =

Location
- Elkton, Kentucky; United States
- Coordinates: 36.7978°N 87.1615°W

Information
- Type: High school
- School district: Todd County Schools
- Teaching staff: 30.00 (FTE)
- Enrollment: 511 (2023–2024)
- Student to teacher ratio: 17.03
- Colors: Crimson and White
- Athletics: Football, soccer, baseball, track, fast-pitch softball, golf, cheerleading, volleyball, basketball, cross-country
- Athletics conference: Kentucky High School Athletic Association
- Mascot: Rebels
- Yearbook: Rebel
- Website: https://tcchs.todd.kyschools.us/

Todd County Central High School is a four-year public high school in the Todd County School district. Located in Elkton, Kentucky, it is currently the only public high school in the county's school district.
