= Maritza Sáenz Ryan =

American army officer

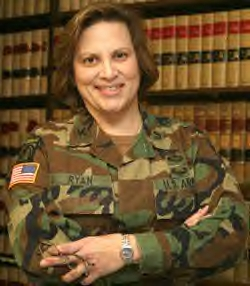
- Colonel Maritza Sáenz Ryan
- Born: Maritza Olmeda Sáenz c. 1960; New York City, NY
- Military career
- Allegiance: United States of America
- Branch: United States Army
- Service years: 1982 – 2015
- Rank: Brigadier general
- Commands: Head of the Department of Law at the United States Military Academy, West Point
- Conflicts: Operation Desert Shield; *Operation Desert Storm

Brigadier general Maritza Sáenz Ryan (Note: This name uses Spanish marriage naming customs; the first is the maiden family name "Sáenz" and the second or matrimonial family name is "Ryan".) (born c. 1960) is a former United States Army officer, and head of the Department of Law at the United States Military Academy. She was the first woman and first Hispanic (Puerto Rican and Spanish heritage) West Point graduate to serve as an academic department head.

As the most senior ranking Hispanic Judge Advocate, Sáenz Ryan has raised awareness of the inequity and impracticality of the Combat Exclusion Policy, which restricts women's roles and opportunities in the military regardless of talent or ability.

Sáenz Ryan retired as a brigadier general in December of 2015.

== Early years ==
Sáenz Ryan (birth name: Maritza Olmeda Sáenz) was born in New York City to a Puerto Rican father and Spanish mother. There she received her primary and secondary education. In the late 1970s she was accepted in the United States Military Academy, also known as "West Point." Sáenz Ryan was a member of only the third class to include women cadets at West Point.

She graduated from West Point in 1982 and was commissioned as a Second Lieutenant in the Field Artillery.

== Military career ==
Sáenz Ryan was assigned to the 1st Armored Division Artillery in Nuremberg, West Germany. She returned to the United States and, through the U.S. Army's Funded Legal Education Program, she studied law in Nashville, Tenn., at Vanderbilt University Law School. After earning her law degree, Sáenz Ryan was selected for Order of the Coif and in 1988, admitted to the New York State Bar #2235323. Sáenz Ryan was reassigned to the Judge Advocate General's Corps (JAGC) as a trial counsel at Fort Sill, Oklahoma.

Sáenz Ryan, who had been promoted to the rank of captain, was deployed overseas during Operations Desert Shield and Desert Storm and was assigned as the brigade legal counsel for a Field Artillery brigade.

She returned to JAG Corps headquarters in Washington, DC. and earned her master's degree in Law (LLM) from the Judge Advocate General's School in Charlottesville, Virginia. She was later selected to attend the Command & General Staff College at Fort Leavenworth, Kansas. In 1999, while she was attending the Command and General Staff College, doctors found and removed a cancerous tumor from her leg. Sáenz Ryan recovered, continued on Army active duty, and applied for a professorship at West Point Academy. Sáenz Ryan holds a Master of Laws in Military Law from The Judge Advocate General's Legal Center and School and a Master of Arts in National Security & Strategic Studies from Naval War College.

In August, 2001, Sáenz Ryan was appointed Deputy Head, Department of Law, at the U.S. Military Academy, one of two newly created permanent military faculty positions in the department. Her Commanding officer and mentor, Brigadier General Pat Finnegan, allowed her to receive treatment for her condition and to have a full recovery before she could assume her position full-time.

In 2006, after accepting the presidential nomination and being confirmed by Congress, Sáenz Ryan was named head of the Department of Law at the United States Military Academy. She replaced former head Finnegan, who left to become the academy's Dean of the Academic Board.

Sáenz Ryan is currently the most senior-ranking Hispanic Judge Advocate. She is also the first woman and first Hispanic West Point graduate, to serve as an academic department head.

Sáenz Ryan played an instrumental role in raising awareness of the inequity and impracticality of the Combat Exclusion Policy, which restricts women's roles and opportunities in the military regardless of talent or ability. In 2008, the West Point Center for the Rule of Law was established under her leadership. In November 2023, Sáenz Ryan was nominated by U.S. president Joe Biden to become a member of the board of visitors of the United States Coast Guard Academy.

== Personal life ==
While studying and training at West Point, Sáenz Ryan met fellow cadet Robert Ryan. They later married and had two children, Alexander and Andrew.

== Honors ==
In 2000, Sáenz Ryan was named as one of the "Top 100 Influential Hispanics" by Hispanic Magazine. On August 7, 2010 she received the Margaret Brent Award, given annually by the ABA's (American Bar Association) Commission on Women in the Profession, to women lawyers who have achieved professional excellence in their field and share a commitment to champion other women.

== Military awards decorations ==
Amongst Col. Sáenz Ryan 's military awards and decorations are the following:

- Meritorious Service Medal
- Army Commendation Medal
- Joint Services Commendation Medal
- National Defense Service Medal
- Armed Forces Expeditionary Medal
- Southwest Asia Service Medal
- Global War on Terrorism Service Medal
- Army Service Ribbon
- Army Overseas Service Ribbon
- Kuwait Liberation Medal (Saudi Arabian)
- Kuwait Liberation Medal (Kuwait)
- Army Superior Unit Award

Badges

- Air Assault Badge
- Parachutist badge

== See also ==
- List of Puerto Ricans
- List of Puerto Rican military personnel
- Puerto Rican women in the military
- Irish immigration to Puerto Rico
- History of women in Puerto Rico
