= Walton J. Wood =

American lawyer

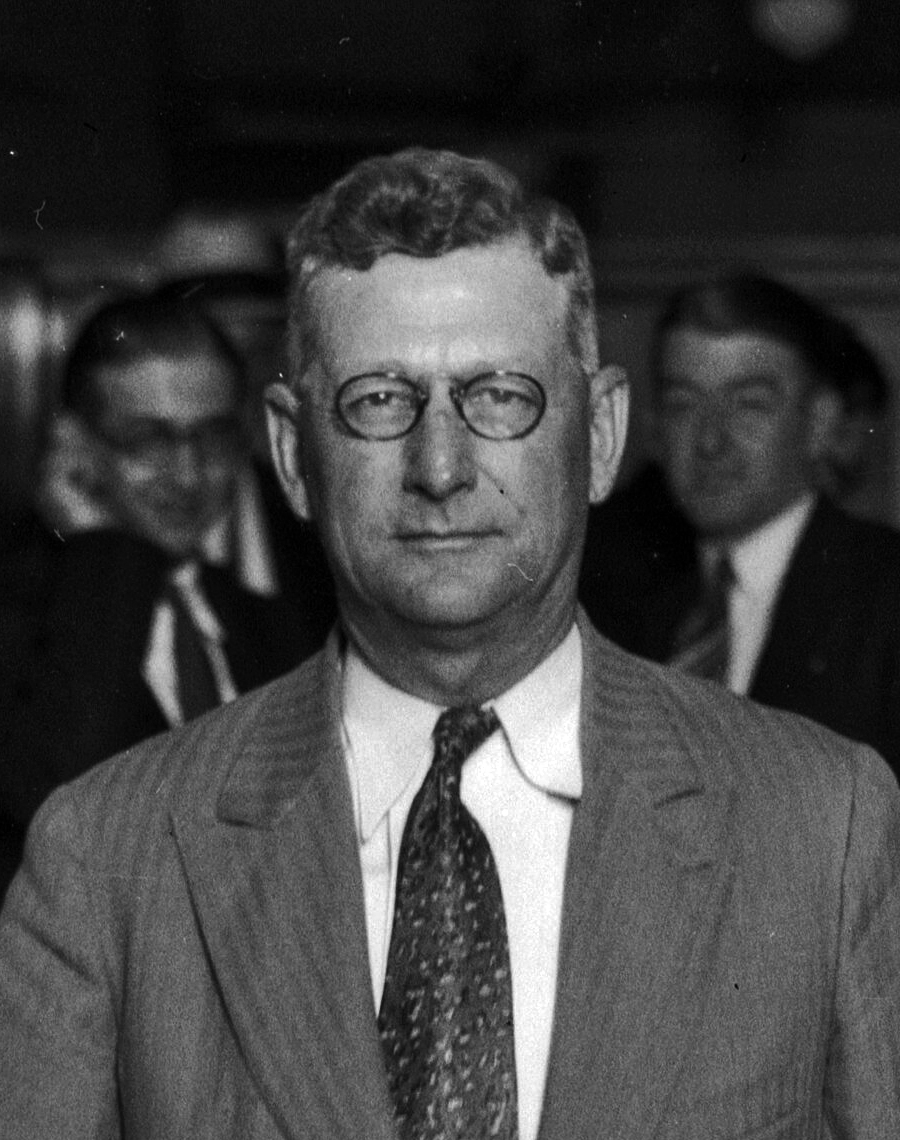
Walton J. Wood

Walton Jones Wood (August 5, 1878 – September 2, 1945) was an American attorney and jurist who served as the first public defender in United States history from 1914 to 1921 and as an associate justice of the California Second District Court of Appeal, Division Two from 1935 to 1945, having been appointed to the latter post by Republican Governor Frank Merriam.

Born in Oroville, California, Wood earned his A.B. from Stanford University in 1901, and did graduate work at Vanderbilt University and the UC Berkeley School of Law. He served as an attorney in private practice in the Philippines from 1902 to 1906. Earning admission to the California State Bar in January 1907, Wood served as an attorney in private practice in Los Angeles, California from 1907 to 1913. From 1913 to 1914, he was a Deputy City Attorney for Los Angeles.

On January 6, 1914, the Los Angeles County Board of Supervisors appointed Wood the first public defender in U.S. history. Under Wood's leadership, the new Public Defender's Office handled over one hundred cases per week, including an average of forty-five felony cases.

Wood left the public defender's post on January 2, 1921, when Republican Governor William Stephens appointed him a judge of the Los Angeles County Superior Court. Wood left the Superior Court on September 5, 1935, upon his appointment to the appeals bench.

Wood died in office in Pasadena, California on September 2, 1945.

Legal offices
Preceded by Charles S. Crail	Associate Justice of the California Court of Appeal; Second District, Division Two; September 5, 1935 – September 2, 1945	Succeeded by Emmet H. Wilson
