= Edwin Hunt =

American lawyer

Edwin Francis Hunt
- Born: July 9, 1902; Jackson, Tennessee, U.S.
- Died: April 11, 1981 (aged 78)
- Education: Vanderbilt University
- Occupation: Assistant Attorney General
- Known for: US checkers champion in 1934

Edwin Francis Hunt (July 9, 1902 – April 11, 1981) was an American draughts, or checkers, player who spent most of his life in Nashville. He was US champion in 1934.

His career was as a lawyer and as such he gained recognition as an appellate advocate and rose to the rank of Assistant Attorney General. He had studied at Vanderbilt University where he won the Founder's Medal twice.
