= Milliken Memorial Community House =

- U.S. National Register of Historic Places

- Location within Kentucky Location within the United States
- Location: 208 W. Main St., Elkton, Kentucky
- Coordinates: 36°48′37″N 87°9′21″W
- Built: 1928
- Architect: Marr & Holman, George Koyl
- Architectural style: Classical Revival
- NRHP reference No.: 90001834
- Added to NRHP: December 06, 1990

Milliken Memorial Community House, erected in 1928 in Elkton, Kentucky, is the first privately donated community house in America. The 13,000-square-foot (1,200 m^{2}) mansion pioneered a new architectural program for public use. The house was commissioned by Mary Louise Milliken (1873–1936) and her husband Samuel Canning Childs (April 2, 1859 – 1934) in 1926.

Both were wealthy philanthropists and were responsible for the construction of over twenty hospitals and two churches throughout the United States. Childs was a wealthy businessman who had founded the American Food Store Company, a prominent Mid-Atlantic retail grocery chain. A Woman's Club was organized in Elkton in 1924 and Mr. & Mrs. Childs began formulating plans to construct a community center for this and other social groups. Designed for the specific purpose of housing community events and funded entirely by Mr. and Mrs. Childs, the building was to be a permanent memorial to the memory of her mother.

Construction of the building began in fall of that year (1927) and was completed in April during the next year (1928) at a cost of $75,000, equal to $1,478,000(2008) today. Average home cost in 1928 was 4,000 dollars.

Local contractor V.L. Price constructed the building and the architect responsible for the buildings design is Geo. S. Koyl and Marr & Holman Architects. The mansion is designed in the Neo-Classical style of Flemish bond brick with a large two-story portico on the main facade. The main section is two stories with a porte-cochere on the west facade and with a one-story apollarium ballroom wing at the rear.

The house was officially opened on April 11- April 12 in a two-day celebration. Mary Louise and Canning booked the Francis Craig Orchestra from RCA Records to play for the opening ball. Newspapers from Lexington and Nashville covered the event naming it one of the greatest successes of generosity ever recorded.

== Book ==
Home Elsewhere was released on July 25 of 2007. The non-fiction book catalogs the history of the house, and the life of Mary Louise Milliken Childs and her project, the Milliken Memorial Community House. Matthew Colin Bailey completed the first book after 3 years of research. Home Elsewhere was pre-released in Todd County, Kentucky as a first edition. The statewide second edition was released in 2008 at Kentucky bookstores. The second edition was edited by James Coursey.
