= Kirkmansville, Kentucky =

Kirkmansville
- Unincorporated community
- Location within the state of Kentucky
- Coordinates: 37°0′36.15″N 87°14′33.00″W
- Country: United States
- State: Kentucky
- County: Todd
- Elevation: 505 ft (154 m)
- Time zone: UTC-6 (Central (CST))
  - Summer (DST): UTC-5 (CST)
- ZIP codes: 42253
- Area codes: 270 and 364
- GNIS feature ID: 495801

Kirkmansville is an unincorporated community in Todd County, Kentucky, United States.

== Geography ==
Kirkmansville is located in the northwestern portion of Todd County at the junction of KY 107 and KY 171.
