= Mary Louise Milliken Childs =

American philanthropist

Mary Louise Milliken Childs (1873–1936) was an American philanthropist in the 20th century. She built over twenty hospitals and two churches in the United States. Her projects included the West Jersey Cooper Hospital in New Jersey and the Milliken Memorial Community House in Elkton, Kentucky.

== Philanthropy ==
Childs provided $75,000 for construction of the Elkton Community House in Elkton, Kentucky, which opened in 1928. It was called the Milliken Memorial Community House in tribute to her.

== Personal life and legacy ==
Mary Louise Milliken cared for her father for many years, and married late in life, to philanthropist and businessman Samuel Canning Childs. Her husband died in 1932, and she died in 1936. As of 2019, the Milliken House in Elkton continues to host community events and organizations.
