= Claymour, Kentucky =

Claymour
- Unincorporated community
- Location within the state of Kentucky
- Coordinates: 36°53′12.15″N 87°6′41.00″W
- Country: United States
- State: Kentucky
- County: Todd
- Elevation: 643 ft (196 m)
- Time zone: UTC-6 (Central (CST))
  - Summer (DST): UTC-5 (CST)
- Area codes: 270 and 364
- GNIS feature ID: 489594

Claymour is an unincorporated community in Todd County, Kentucky, United States.

== History ==
The community of Claymour was established primarily as a farming community sometime around the 1850s.

== Geography ==
Claymour is located on east-central Todd County about 5 miles (8.0 km) northeast of Elkton along Kentucky Route 106 (KY 106) at its junction with KY 507 and KY 178.

== Annual events ==
Claymour is home to a Christian-oriented annual event, the Claymour Camp Meeting, an outdoor revival meeting which has been held since 1903.
