= James Gordon Shanklin =

FBI agent who had a major influence in the investigation of the Kennedy assassination

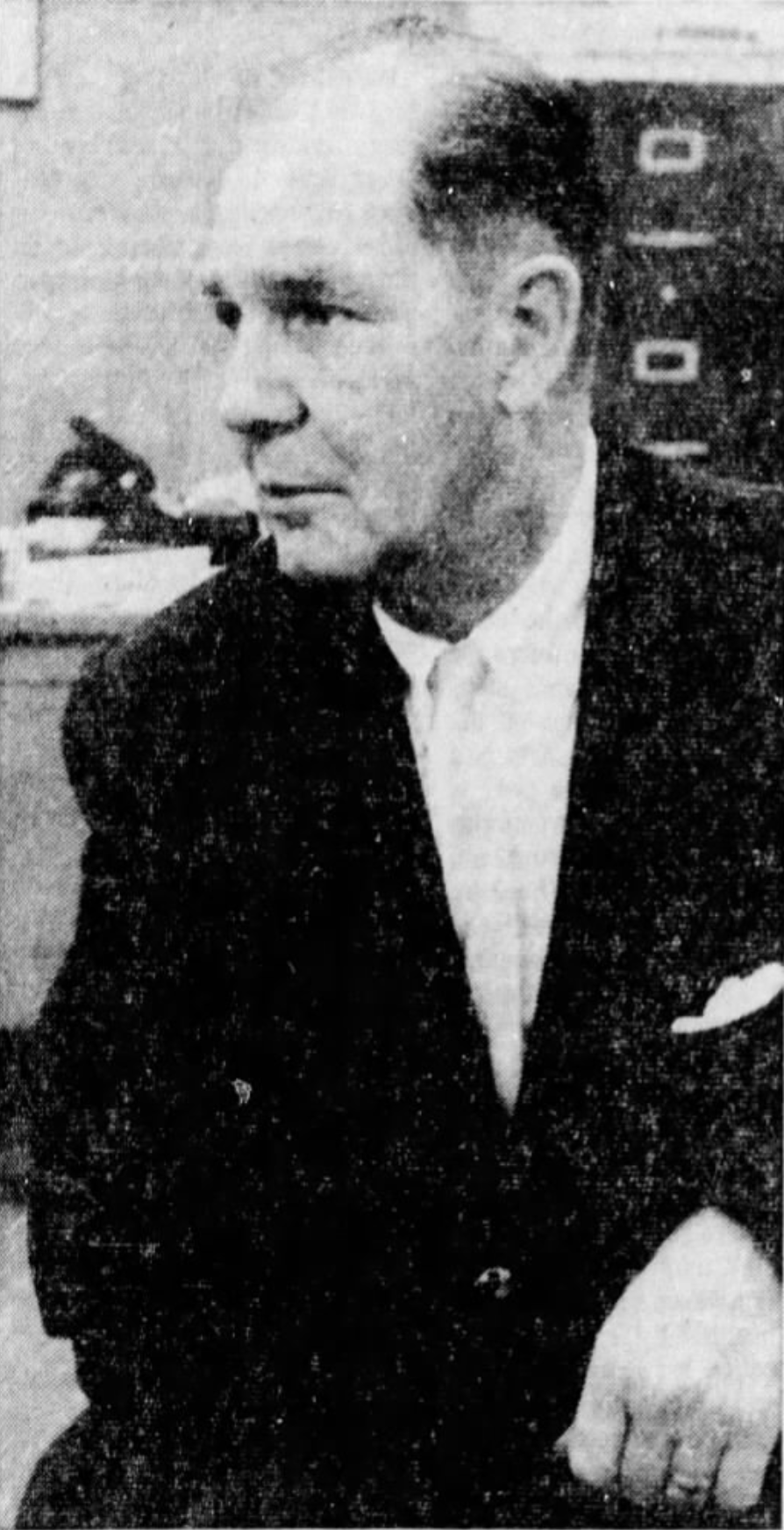
- Shanklin in April 1963
- Born: December 10, 1909; Elkton, Kentucky, United States
- Died: July 11, 1988 (aged 78); Dallas, Texas, United States
- Other name: "JG Shanklin"
- Education: Vanderbilt University
- Occupations: FBI special agent in-charge, lawyer
- Years active: 1943–1975
- Spouse: Emily Shanklin (m. 1933)

James Gordon Shanklin (December 10, 1909 – July 11, 1988) was an American FBI agent and lawyer best known for his role in the investigation of the assassination of John F. Kennedy and facilitating the online network of the Federal Bureau of Investigation communications known as the National Crime Information Center.

== Life ==
James Gordon Shanklin was born on December 10, 1909, in Elkton, Kentucky, to Kentucky State Representative William Sinclair Shanklin, a member of the Shanklin family, and his wife Eva Jones Shanklin. He married Emily Agnes Shacklett on January 28, 1933, in Brownsville, Kentucky. At a young age, James Gordon Shanklin exhibited a strong desire for academic achievement and athletics. He was admitted to the Vanderbilt Training School located in Elkton. Shanklin enrolled in Vanderbilt University in 1928 in Nashville, Tennessee to study law, graduating in 1935 earning a B.A. and LL.B. Shanklin also played for the Vanderbilt Commodores football team.

Shanklin died on July 11, 1988, in Dallas, Texas, at the age of 78, and was buried in Dallas. His wife Emily (died 2017) is buried beside him.

== Career ==
Mr. Shanklin joined the FBI in 1943. Shanklin was named special agent in charge of the FBI's Dallas office in April 1963, seven months before the shooting of President John F. Kennedy on November 22. Before this assignment he headed the FBI's offices in Pittsburgh, Mobile, El Paso, and Honolulu.

During his time at the Federal Bureau of Investigation as agent in-charge of the Dallas Field Office, Shanklin received national notoriety during the investigation of the assassination of President John F. Kennedy. Dallas Agent James P. Hosty discarded a letter written by assassin Lee Harvey Oswald that had been sent to the Dallas FBI prior to the assassination of Kennedy. Following the President's death, Shanklin was informed of the existence of the Oswald letter and that it had been discarded. During a subsequent investigation conducted by the Warren Commission, Hosty failed to tell the commission the truth about Oswald's hostile letter because he had discarded it—redirecting blame of the incident towards his superior's alleged orders. His superior, Gordon Shanklin, denied Hosty's claim. As a result, Hosty attracted speculation as a possible conspirator in several conspiracy theories. Also in 1964, Dallas police chief Jesse Curry accused the FBI of covering up the discarded letter incident, but retracted his statement after Shanklin challenged him to prove it.

While serving as agent-in-charge at the Dallas Federal Bureau of Investigation, Shanklin assisted in the implementation of the National Crime Information Center created via network servers that were shared among FBI offices throughout the United States enabling greater record search capabilities and communication between FBI offices.

Shanklin was employed with the FBI for over 32 years, retiring in 1975 to practice law in Dallas where he was made partner in the Dallas firm Johnson, Guthrie, Billings, Nash, and Shanklin.

== Media ==
The incident of the Hosty/Oswald note was fictionalized in the 2013 film Parkland starring Zac Efron, David Harbour playing James Gordon Shanklin, Ron Livingston, Billy Bob Thornton, Colin Hanks, Paul Giamatti, among others. The conclusion of the movie erroneously depicts Shanklin as the antagonist of the Hosty note destruction. The film was produced by Bill Paxton, Tom Hanks, Gary Goetzman, and Matt and Nigel Sinclaire. He is portrayed by Russell Ferrier in TV series 11.22.63.

== Memorialization ==
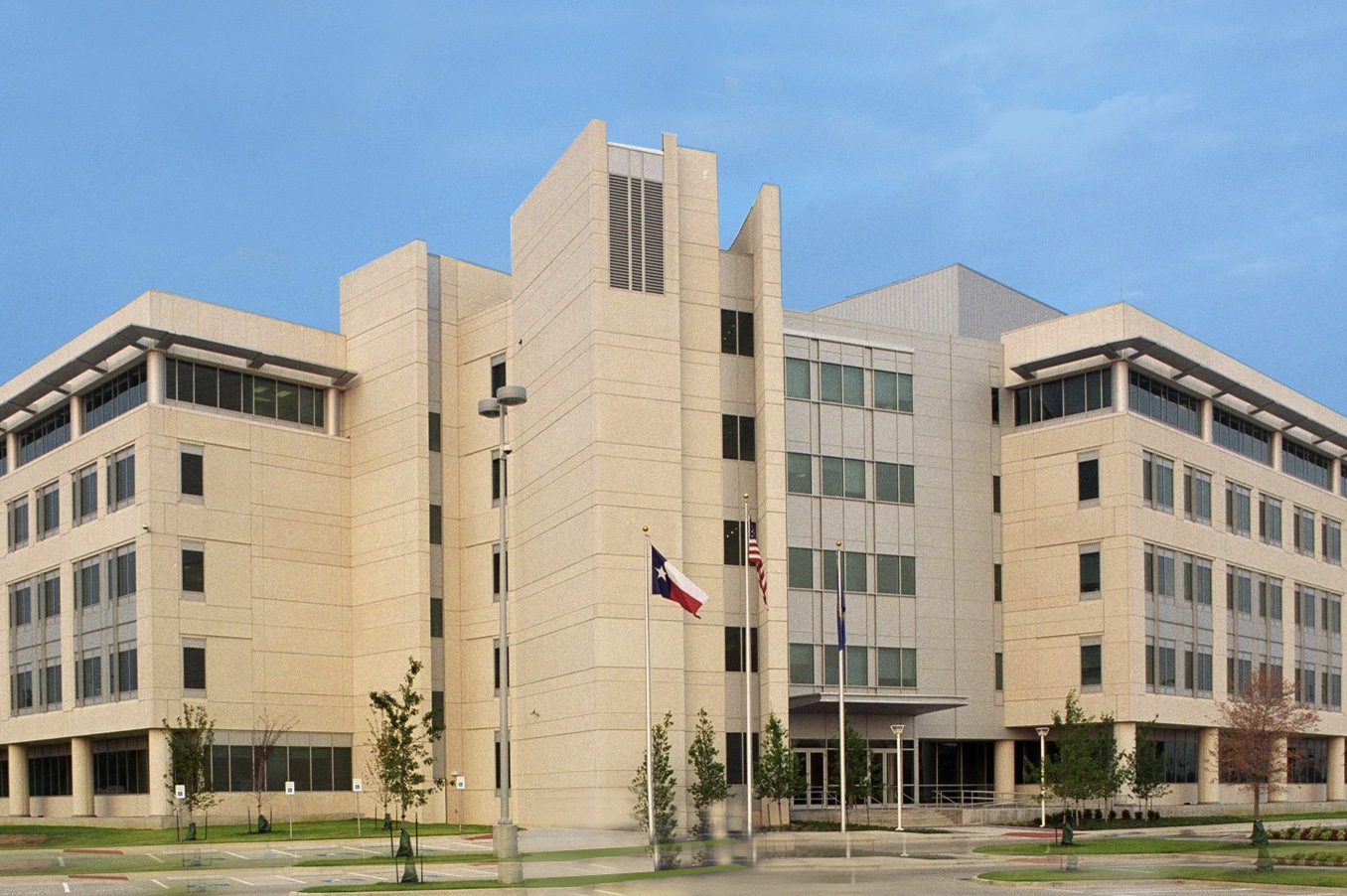
The J. Gordon Shanklin Building, One Justice Way, home of the Dallas Office of the FBI since November 2002.

The "state-of-the-art" post 9/11 Dallas Federal Bureau of Investigation office was completed in 2002 and named in honor of James Gordon Shanklin. The dedication ceremony was attended by Robert Mueller and Shanklin's remaining family; wife: Emily Shanklin and granddaughter: Lisa A. Shanklin.
