= Allegre, Kentucky =

Unincorporated community in Kentucky, United States

Allegre
- Unincorporated community
- Location within the state of Kentucky Allegre (the United States)
- Coordinates: 36°55′43″N 87°13′2″W
- Country: United States
- State: Kentucky
- County: Todd
- Elevation: 643 ft (196 m)
- Time zone: UTC-6 (Central (CST))
  - Summer (DST): UTC-5 (CDT)
- ZIP codes: 42203
- GNIS feature ID: 485843

Allegre (/ˈælɪɡriː/) is an unincorporated community located in Todd County, Kentucky, United States.
