= Elkton, Kentucky =

- City
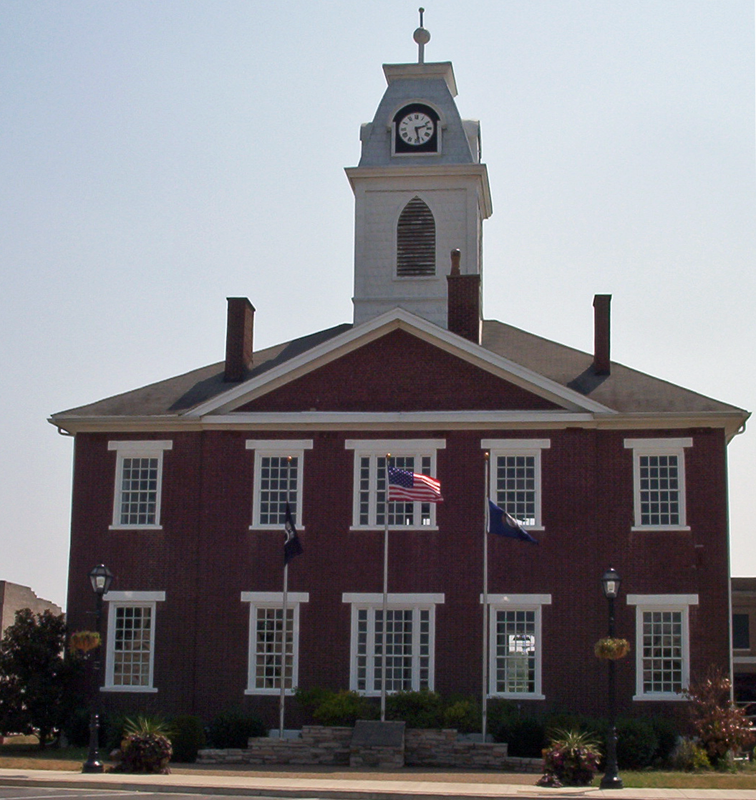
- The Todd County courthouse in the Elkton town square

- Location of Elkton in Todd County, Kentucky.
- Coordinates: 36°48′32″N 87°9′23″W
- Country: United States
- State: Kentucky
- County: Todd
- Established: 1820

Government
  - Mayor: Arthur Green

Area
  - Total: 2.55 sq mi (6.61 km^{2})
  - Land: 2.55 sq mi (6.60 km^{2})
  - Water: 0.0039 sq mi (0.01 km^{2})
- Elevation: 623 ft (190 m)

Population (2020)
  - Total: 2,056
  - Estimate (2022): 2,141
  - Density: 806.7/sq mi (311.45/km^{2})
- Time zone: UTC-6 (CST)
  - Summer (DST): UTC-5 (CDT)
- ZIP Code: 42220
- Area codes: 270 & 364
- FIPS code: 21-24400
- GNIS feature ID: 0491697
- Website: www.elktonky.com

Elkton is a home rule-class city in and the county seat of Todd County, Kentucky, United States. As of the 2020 census, Elkton had a population of 2,056.

== History ==
The city was founded by Major John Gray and established by the state assembly in 1820. It is named for the presence of an elk herd that utilized a nearby waterway and natural salt lick. It was formally incorporated in 1843.

== Geography ==
Elkton is located at 36°48′32″N 87°9′23″W (36.808926, -87.156377).

According to the United States Census Bureau, the city has a total area of 2.1 square miles (5.4 km^{2}), all land.

== Demographics ==
Historical population
Census	Pop.	Note	%±
1840	474		—
1880	874		—
1890	1,158		32.5%
1900	1,123		−3.0%
1910	1,228		9.3%
1920	1,009		−17.8%
1930	951		−5.7%
1940	1,214		27.7%
1950	1,312		8.1%
1960	1,448		10.4%
1970	1,612		11.3%
1980	1,815		12.6%
1990	1,789		−1.4%
2000	2,022		13.0%
2010	2,062		2.0%
2020	2,056		−0.3%
2022 (est.)	2,141		4.1%
U.S. Decennial Census

=== 2020 census ===
As of the 2020 census, Elkton had a population of 2,056. The median age was 38.7 years. 24.8% of residents were under the age of 18 and 19.3% of residents were 65 years of age or older. For every 100 females there were 92.5 males, and for every 100 females age 18 and over there were 89.1 males age 18 and over.

0.0% of residents lived in urban areas, while 100.0% lived in rural areas.

There were 818 households in Elkton, of which 30.8% had children under the age of 18 living in them. Of all households, 35.7% were married-couple households, 18.7% were households with a male householder and no spouse or partner present, and 37.5% were households with a female householder and no spouse or partner present. About 33.9% of all households were made up of individuals and 17.3% had someone living alone who was 65 years of age or older.

There were 957 housing units, of which 14.5% were vacant. The homeowner vacancy rate was 0.6% and the rental vacancy rate was 10.8%.

Racial composition as of the 2020 census
Race	Number	Percent
White	1,498	72.9%
Black or African American	295	14.3%
American Indian and Alaska Native	8	0.4%
Asian	3	0.1%
Native Hawaiian and Other Pacific Islander	1	0.0%
Some other race	120	5.8%
Two or more races	131	6.4%
Hispanic or Latino (of any race)	184	8.9%

=== 2000 census ===
As of the 2000 census, there were 1,984 people, 810 households, and 541 families residing in the city. The population density was 959.4 inhabitants per square mile (370.4/km^{2}). There were 928 housing units at an average density of 448.8 per square mile (173.3/km^{2}). The racial makeup of the city was 82.31% White, 15.68% African American, 0.15% Native American, 0.30% Asian, 1.21% from other races, and 0.35% from two or more races. Hispanic or Latino of any race were 2.32% of the population.

There were 666 households, out of which 69% had children under the age of 18 living with them, 43.7% were married couples living together, 19.5% had a female householder with no husband present, and 33.1% were non-families. 30.5% of all households were made up of individuals, and 18.4% had someone living alone who was 65 years of age or older. The average household size was 2.29 and the average family size was 2.82.

In the city, the population was spread out, with 22.3% under the age of 18, 9.0% from 18 to 24, 26.1% from 25 to 44, 21.3% from 45 to 64, and 21.3% who were 65 years of age or older. The median age was 69 years. For every 100 females, there were 80.4 males. For every 100 females age 18 and over, there were 78.3 males.

The median income for a household in the city was $24,924, and the median income for a family was $31,912. Males had a median income of $26,799 versus $20,134 for females. The per capita income for the city was $14,297. About 15.7% of families and 17.5% of the population were below the poverty line, including 18.9% of those under age 18 and 20.0% of those age 65 or over.

== Notable people ==
- George Street Boone, constitutional scholar
- Benjamin Bristow, first Solicitor General of the United States and a former U.S. Treasury Secretary
- Francis Bristow, United States Representative from Kentucky
- James Clark McReynolds, former Associate Justice of the United States Supreme Court
- Mary Louise Milliken Childs, great American philanthropist
- David Morton, poet
- James Gordon Shanklin, FBI Agent
- Anthony New, Congressman, Representative
- Paul Rudolph, architect
- Jess Sweetser, first American-born golfer to win the British Amateur

== Education ==
Elkton has a lending library, the Todd County Public Library.

The Todd County School District includes the Todd County Central High School.

== Climate ==
The climate in this area is characterized by hot, humid summers and generally mild to cool winters. According to the Köppen Climate Classification system, Elkton has a humid subtropical climate, abbreviated "Cfa" on climate maps.
