= Billy Byars Jr. =

American film producer (born 1936)

- Byars on the set of The Genesis Children, 1970, Rome
- Born: August 14, 1936 (age 90); Grayson County, Texas, U.S.
- Occupations: Film producer; molecular biologist; child pornographer
- Known for: The Genesis Children
- Parent: Billy Byars Sr. (adoptive father)

William Goebel Byars Jr. (born August 14, 1936) is an American former film producer, best known as the founder of Lyric International and the producer of the 1972 art film The Genesis Children.

Outside of regular film production, Byars Jr. was a child pornographer who ran a collaborative operation called "DOM-Lyric" with gay rights activist Guy Strait in the early 1970s.

== Early life ==
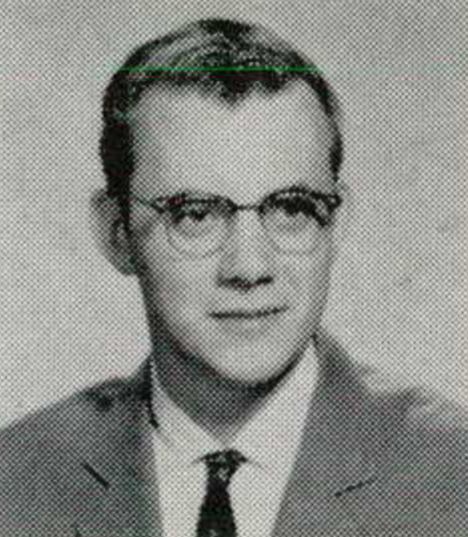
Byars at Southern Methodist University in University Park, Texas, 1957

Byars was born in Grayson County, Texas, in 1936. He would soon be adopted through the Edna Gladney Foundation by Billy Byars Sr., a wealthy oilman and cattle rancher of Tyler, Texas. Byars Sr. sold cattle to the Gettysburg Farm and was friends with president Dwight Eisenhower.

In 1957, Byars Jr. was the publicity chairman of the Tyler-based hot rod organization East Texas Timing Association.

Prior to film production, Byars worked as a molecular biologist. When asked why he had changed fields, Byars claimed, "Research, as interesting as it was, was somehow restrictive. I had things to say, and I wanted to say them to people, so I got into an expressive field. Film production is an art, and I approach it as such."

== Lyric International ==
Byars' film company, Lyric International (a.k.a. Lyric Productions), was headquartered in the Samuel Goldwyn Lot in West Hollywood. Lyric International would be used for shooting and producing both films and child pornography.

=== The Genesis Children ===
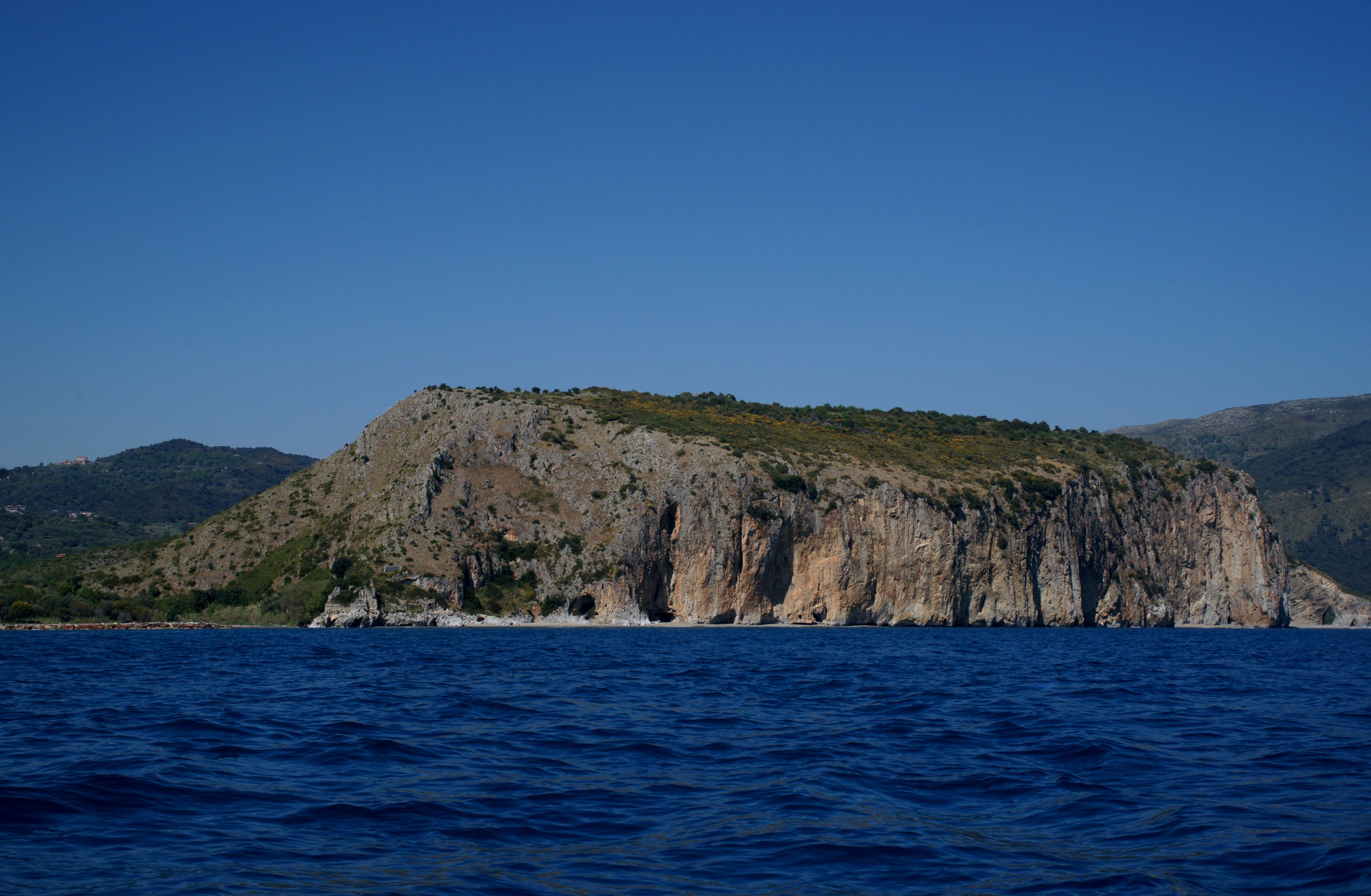
The Genesis Children was filmed in Italy, with much of it taking place on the beaches of Palinuro (pictured)

The Genesis Children was an art film produced by Lyric International. The film was shot in Italy and was produced by Byars and directed by Anthony Aikman. In advertisements, the film claimed to not be for the masses and was created for those who "think, feel, and wonder", and that it was a "symphony for the eyes, ears, and soul". Despite the lack of violence, sex, or profanity, the film was rated X due to it containing over 15 minutes of adolescent nudity out of the 85-minute runtime. The film reportedly went through multiple revisions before its release.

The film followed eight American boys attending an English language school in Italy who sign up for a play that is "to be performed before god" and start to question cultural mores. Critics found the film to be lacking in plot and excessive in nudity.

=== Other films ===
In 1972, Byars began seeking investors in Tyler for his film Heist. Byars was unable to release many details about the film due to copyright matters but claimed that it would "make Hitchcock dizzy". The film was expected to start filming in 1973.

In that same year, Byars also began filming Soviet '73, a television documentary. The film was alleged to be the first uncensored film in the Eastern Bloc and was slated for release in the winter of 1973.

=== Formation of DOM-Lyric ===
In the early 1970s, Byars and gay rights activist and child pornographer Guy Strait teamed up and formed the company DOM-Lyric—a combination of Lyric International and DOM Studios, the latter being Strait's mail-order pornography business.

One of the magazines published under DOM-Lyric described their business venture as the "art of male photography [reaching] a zenith under the aegis of these two artistic persons never equalled—before or since". Reportedly, Byars and Strait had over 90 magazines on the market at $5 apiece. The first edition of each magazine had ten thousand prints, followed by additional runs.

In October 1973, Strait, Byars, a YMCA counselor, a schoolteacher, an assistant scoutmaster, the son of Loretta Young, Christopher Paul Lewis, and eight other men were charged with sex perversion and sodomy. Byars was identified as the producer for Lyric International; additionally, Christopher Paul Lewis was identified as a film producer for Lyric International, and Bill Johnson of Houston was identified as its photographer. At the time of their arrests, Byars was in Europe filming Soviet '73.

== Later life ==
After the DOM-Lyric pedophile ring was exposed, Byars evaded prosecution by remaining in Europe, while Strait was sentenced to 10 to 20 years in prison.

Byars was later able to return to the United States without being prosecuted.

== Relationship to J. Edgar Hoover and John F. Kennedy ==
Due to Byars Sr.'s relationship to J. Edgar Hoover, Byars Jr. had been acquainted with Hoover since childhood.

The Byars and Hoover had shared an adjacent bungalow at the Del Charro Hotel in La Jolla. It was reported that Clyde Tolson and Hoover were guests at Byars' 25th birthday party that took place at Del Charro in 1961.

When Byars Jr. was asked about Hoover's feelings following the assassination of John F. Kennedy, he recalled in 1988, "They would eat together, my father, Murchison, and Hoover, and the others. Hoover seemed to be in a very strange frame of mind. He was having a better relationship with Johnson, evidently, than he had with President Kennedy—by a long shot. His relationship with Bobby Kennedy had apparently almost driven him over the edge. He used to talk about that constantly, and once I had the chance to ask him directly about the assassination."

=== Charles Krebs claims ===
Charles Krebs, a friend of Byars, claimed that Hoover had used his contacts with Byars to have teenage boys brought to his room at La Jolla. Krebs also alleged that a 15-year-old youth at Byars' home at the summit of Laurel Canyon talked openly of having met Hoover at Del Charro. Krebs would additionally claim that he knew of three occasions where four boys were driven down to La Jolla at the request of Hoover and that the arrangements were made by a friend of Byars.

== Filmography ==
- 1972 or earlier – unnamed documentary in Denmark on the International Boys Camp
- 1972 or earlier – unnamed documentary in France on the topic of sculpture
- 1972 – The Genesis Children (co-writer)
- c. 1972–73 – Heist (unreleased/unfinished)
- c. 1972–73 – The Russian Adventure (unreleased/unfinished)
- c. 1972–73 – Soviet '73 (unreleased/unfinished)

== Cited works ==
- Linedecker, Clifford (1981). Children in Chains. New York City: Everest House. ISBN 0896960889.
- Lloyd, Robin (1976). For Money or Love: Boy Prostitution in America. New York City: Ballantine Books. ISBN 0-8149-0773-3.
- Summers, Anthony (1993). Official and Confidential: The Secret Life of J. Edgar Hoover. New York City: G. P. Putnam's Sons. ISBN 0399138005.
