= Guy Strait =

American pornographer and sex offender (1920–1987)

- Strait in 1976
- Born: Elmer Guy Strait; March 25, 1920; Dallas, Texas, U.S.
- Died: March 25, 1987 (aged 67); San Francisco, California, U.S.
- Other name: "The Porno King"
- Education: Art Institute of Chicago
- Occupations: Gay civil rights activist; magazine publisher; pornographer

Elmer Guy Strait (March 25, 1920 – March 25, 1987), nicknamed "The Porno King", was an American gay civil rights activist, magazine publisher, and convicted sex offender.

Initially known for his early gay publications, he later moved on to commercial child pornography, which resulted in Strait being sentenced to 10 to 20 years in prison in the 1970s.

== Early life ==
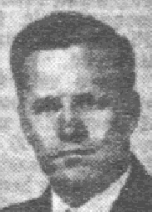
Strait, c. 1947. After his return from the war, he worked in the building materials business.

Strait was born on March 25, 1920, in Dallas, Texas, the tenth of eleven brothers and sisters in a Baptist family. His father died when he was five, after which he spent some time living in an orphanage. At age thirteen, Strait acquired his first camera, a Kodak Brownie, and took photographs of flowers, plant buds, and nudity.

As a young adult, Strait attended the University of Texas for one semester and was expelled due to frequently being absent. After this, he enrolled at Baylor University, where he claimed he was "asked to leave" because he was running a brothel at the former Cotton Palace.

Strait was drafted into the Army in World War II. While serving, he was assigned to an inspector general's department and was sent to units in Berlin, Paris, and Midway. Strait would state that during his time in the military, he saw a great deal of sexual activity among troops, including homosexual activity, which he claimed was more or less tolerated. In 1943, he wrote a letter for the Richardson Echo about his experience during the war in Hawaii. While stationed in Europe, he continued his photography hobby.

In 1951, Strait moved to San Francisco and was a regional sales manager for Curtiss-Wright. He claimed that Wernher von Braun was his "immediate superior". After this, he became a freelance photographer for military bases and began frequenting the Black Cat in San Francisco. During the 1950s, Strait also enrolled in fine arts at the Art Institute of Chicago.

Later, Strait became involved in the formation of the Mikanakawa Tribe. The tribe was formed by Frank Young, Howard Cameron, and Strait. The tribe's purpose was for prior members of the Boy Scouts who were 34 years and older to commence.

== California ==
=== Early publications ===
In 1961, Strait split from SF Mattachine and formed the organization The League for Civil Education in San Francisco. Strait believed that homosexuals could fight oppressive conditions and hostile law enforcement through the creation of a gay voting bloc. In October 1961, Strait created his first paper, which was also the first gay newspaper in San Francisco, LCE News, which would later be known as Citizens News that same year. The paper was published from his offices on Minna Street. The newspapers were first distributed through gay bars and were published under The San Francisco Society for Individual Rights (S.I.R.). The paper was originally intended to only be circulated in the Bay Area, though it expanded to include information on police repression, politics, gay history, social action, and the gay scene. The newspaper ran until March 1967 and was available through subscription, distributed freely through gay bars, and also sold at newsstands.

In 1963, Strait published a guide called The Lavender Baedeker, which circulated between 1963 and 1967. The guide was started after the popularity of Citizens News led to inquiries from the public in regard to places to drink or stay in cities throughout the United States. The publication noted that the publishers had no contact with the bar scene and that information might not be accurate.

In July 1965, Strait created the Cruise News and World Report, which gave warnings of entrapment schemes, as well as news from other cities and critical pieces on the persecution of homosexuals in the United States. Two individuals heavily criticized in the Cruise News and World Report were the mayor of San Francisco, John F. Shelley, and the chief of police of Los Angeles, William H. Parker. Strait also claimed to be the first person to accuse FBI director J. Edgar Hoover of being a "closet queen".

Subsequently, the Cruise News and World Report was later sued by U.S. News & World Report due to the similarity in names. Strait had gone on the record when questioned by the magazine's lawyer in regard to the name, "It's a problem of semantics. You're using the King's English. I use the Queen's!" Due to these legal issues, the paper ceased publication in January 1967.

Following the legal issues of the Cruise News and World Report, Strait created two new publications, Bar Rag and Maverick, in 1967. Maverick had helped pave the way for "underground newspapers" by embracing psychedelic visuals and countercultural attitudes. Maverick was later succeeded by the publication the Haight Ashbury Free Press, which would later be known as the Haight Ashbury Tribune. The Haight Ashbury Free Press was centered around the Summer of Love and included information about events happening in the Haight-Ashbury neighborhood, as well as advice for tourists.

In January 1970, Strait was voted in as the publication's chairman for the Society of Individual Rights (S.I.R.) after the previous chairman resigned.

== Involvement in pornography ==
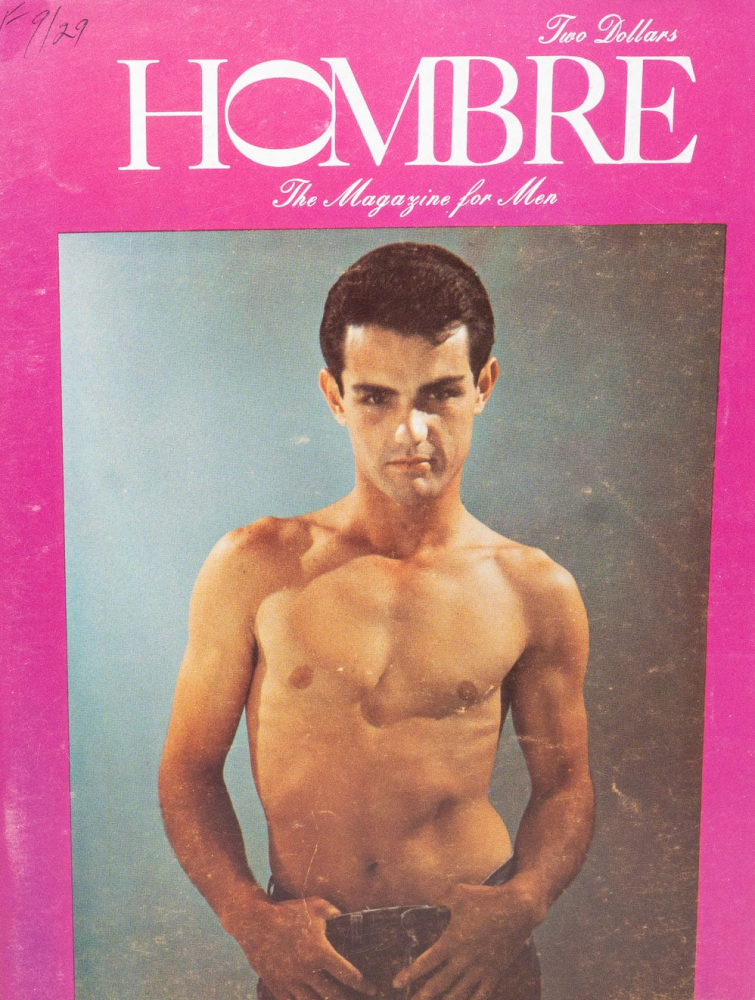
Cover of volume 1, issue 1 of Hombre

Strait claimed that he first became involved in pornography when an associate offered him $2,000 each for two magazines. Strait ran some of the first commercialized child pornography in magazines in the United States which included Hombre, Chico, and Naked Boyhood. In or before 1966, a mail order was set up under the name DOM Studios (an abbreviation of Dirty Old Man) for selling nude photographs, magazines, and movies.

While in San Francisco, Strait ran a studio near Haight-Ashbury for modeling. Individuals who were on drugs or intoxicated were denied, while prospective models were given $10 for a test photo. Strait claimed he had returned all test photos to the prospective models and rejected most of them. Strait produced both heterosexual and homosexual material, as well as age differences, incest, and child pornography, though he would not film violence. During this period, Strait started processing his own film to release material at a quicker rate.

=== Billy Byars Jr. ===
Billy Byars Jr. and Guy Strait were close business partners during the 1970s. Byars and Strait created a joint business under the name DOM-Lyric.

Strait, Byars, and their associates under Lyric Film Productions reportedly had 90 different magazines on the market retailing for $5 apiece, while films were marked at $50. Each began with 10,000 copies, followed by additional printing runs. In total they acquired over a quarter million dollars in revenue.

Strait's arrest followed an October 1973 indictment of Byars and others, which included a YMCA counselor, a schoolteacher, an assistant scoutmaster, screenwriter Christopher Paul Lewis, and eight other men who were returned by the Los Angeles grand jury. Byars was identified as the owner of multiple film companies, including Lyric Productions. Lewis was also identified as a film producer for Lyric, while a man named William Johnson, who was a photographer from Houston, was identified as a close associate of Byars. It was found that boys between the ages of six and seventeen had performed in the movies. Strait was subsequently arrested and charged with contributing to the delinquency of minors.

After Strait posted bond, it was rumored he had fled to Europe. One of his publications stated, "We have no idea where he is today... wherever he is—and reliable sources say he is in Turkey or Greece—we wish him well." In reality, Strait never left the country and instead made his way to Rockford, Illinois, though Byars and his affiliate William Johnson had fled and moved abroad to Europe to avoid persecution.

=== Rockford, Illinois ===
In February 1976, Strait, a mental health caseworker for the Singer Mental Health Center; Richard Vander Linden, a regional editor for the Rockford Morning Star; and Daniel Dileo were among those arrested in a 10-month investigation following complaints to a minister about sexual abuse made by three youths. Strait and his associates had reportedly invited five to seven boys ranging between the ages of 12 to 15 to parties where they were given beer and marijuana to lure them into homosexual acts before being filmed. Subsequently, Vander Linden was charged with three counts of indecent liberties with underage boys, while the other three men were charged with one count of indecent liberties with a child.

Following Strait's sentencing, he began serving a 10- to 20-year sentence at Stateville Penitentiary. Despite his imprisonment, his operation continued.

In 1977, Strait came before the U.S. Senate Subcommittee in regard to the growing issue of child pornography. When asked by Senator Malcolm Wallop if he felt that the experience of being in pornographic films had been harmful to the children involved or if it had been beneficial, Strait answered, "Yes, I believe it may have been beneficial." Strait also said that he believed "pornography had a worthwhile place in the American family."

Strait also mentioned that he had known John David Norman and that he had written an article for Hermes magazine, a Chicago journal publishing philosophy and stories of "boy love".

== Later life ==
While in prison, Strait became a jailhouse lawyer focusing on federal law. After being moved to a lower security prison, Strait worked on three books: Memoirs of a Dirty Old Man, Hell in Illinois, and Tyranny's New Home: Rockford.

Strait died in San Francisco, California, on March 25, 1987, his 67th birthday.

== Cited works ==
- Linedecker, Clifford (1981). Children in Chains. New York City: Everest House. ISBN 0896960889.
- Lloyd, Robin (1976). For Money or Love: Boy Prostitution in America. New York City: Ballantine Books. ISBN 0-8149-0773-3.
- Ramsland, Katherine; Ullman, Tracy (2024). The Serial Killer's Apprentice: The True Story of How Houston's Deadliest Murderer Turned a Kid Into a Killing Machine. New York: Penzler Publishers. pp. 136–138. ISBN 978-1-613-16495-2.
- Summers, Anthony (1993). Official and Confidential: The Secret Life of J. Edgar Hoover. New York City: G. P. Putnam's Sons. ISBN 0399138005.
