= Billy Byars =

Billy Byars may refer to:

- Billy Byars Sr. (1901–1965), American oilman, cattle rancher, and sportsman
- Billy Byars Jr. (born 1936), American film producer
