= Blood Cult =

1985 film

- Film poster
- Directed by: Christopher Lewis
- Written by: Stuart Rosenthal; James Vance (additional dialogue)
- Produced by: Linda Lewis
- Starring: Juli Andelman; Charles Ellis; James Vance; Bennie Lee McGowan
- Cinematography: Paul McFarlane
- Edited by: Christopher Lewis; Paul McFarlane
- Music by: Rod Slane
- Distributed by: United Entertainment Pictures
- Release date: May 1985
- Running time: 89 minutes
- Country: United States
- Language: English
- Budget: $30,000

Blood Cult is a 1985 American direct-to-video slasher film directed and co-edited by Christopher Lewis and starring Juli Andelman, Charles Ellis, James Vance, and Bennie Lee McGowan. It is notable for being one of the first shot-on-video horror films to achieve notoriety, being heavily promoted to the video rental market.

The film was shot in Tulsa, Oklahoma, over nine days in March 1985 using two Betacam cameras, under the working title The Sorority House Murders.

== Plot ==
A mysterious serial killer is killing female students on and off a college campus in Oklahoma, and the only clues are gold medallions left by the bodies. A grizzled police detective, Ron, sets out to find the killer, but the hunter becomes the hunted when he sees that no one around him can be trusted, not even his daughter. The detective is unaware that all the killings lead to a secret society that worships the god "Canis" and offers human sacrifices.

== Cast ==
- Juli Andelman as Tina Wilbois
- Charles Ellis as Ron Wilbois
- James Vance as Joel Hogan
- Bennie Lee McGowan as Mrs. Gracie Moore
- Peter Hart as Doc White
- David Stice as Deputy
- Fred Graves as Dean Charles Bailey
- Bob Duffield as Mr. Moore

== Production ==
Tulsa, Oklahoma based businessman, Bill Blair, first entered into the filmmaking business through his company United Films which specialized in supplying 16 mm film prints to schools and civic organizations. Shortly after Sony introduced Betamax to the consumer market, Blair gradually shifted his company's focus from film rentals to distribution of video cassettes and reflected this change by rebranding the company as Video Communications, Inc. with a particular focus on low budget independent productions that had escaped notice of other distribution houses (with notable examples such as Night of the Living Dead, Dark Star,First Spaceship on Venus, and Gorgo). As video licensing rights became more expensive, Blair decided to branch the company into direct-to-video productions rebranding once again as United Entertainment Pictures and beginning production on the $30,000 Blood Cult and $60,000 The Ripper. Blair had developed Blood Cult several year's earlier with screenwriter Dr. Stuart Rosenthal. The character of Ron Wilbois was written with Buster Crabbe in mind as Blair had become acquainted with Crabbe when re-releasing some of Crabbe's film serials. Blair worked with business partners Christopher and Linda Lewis in reviving the Blood Cult script as the inaugural project for the company as it along with The Ripper were seen as having a built-in audience. To provide effects work for the film, the owner of a local magic shop introduced Blair to amateur make-up artists David Powell and Robert Brewster who agreed to work for cheap as they wanted an opportunity to expose their work on national level and were also enthused by the prospect of meeting Tom Savini who was shooting the company's other production The Ripper.

== Release ==
Blood Cult was released for the first time on DVD by Vci Video on August 28, 2001. Vci later re-released the film as a part of its three-disk "The Ripper Blood Pack" on October 31, 2006. The film was later released by Mill Creek Entertainment on July 24, 2007, as a part of its twelve-disk "Decrepit Crypt of Nightmares: 50 Movie Pack". It was last released again by Vci on September 11, 2012, as a double feature with Revenge (1986).

== Reception ==
Blood Cult received mostly negative reviews from critics. Justin Kerswell, from Hysteria Lives!, awarded the film 1/5 stars due to the film's lack of suspense/thrills, "laughable" dialogue, and for having "the most unattractive cast in slasher movie history". Josh G. from Oh, the Horror hated the film, stating that the film started out well, but was ruined by poor acting, gore effects, "ridiculous dialogue", and ending. Josh concluded his review by calling it "the cure for sleeplessness".

Todd Martin from HorrorNews.net gave the film a positive review, while also noting the film's poor acting and special effects. Martin concluded his review by stating, "Yes, it is cheesy as hell and a little over the top at times but if you’re a fan of corny low budget horror flicks then you will most likely dig it as much as I did."
