= Judy Lewis =

American actress, writer, producer, and therapist (1935–2011)

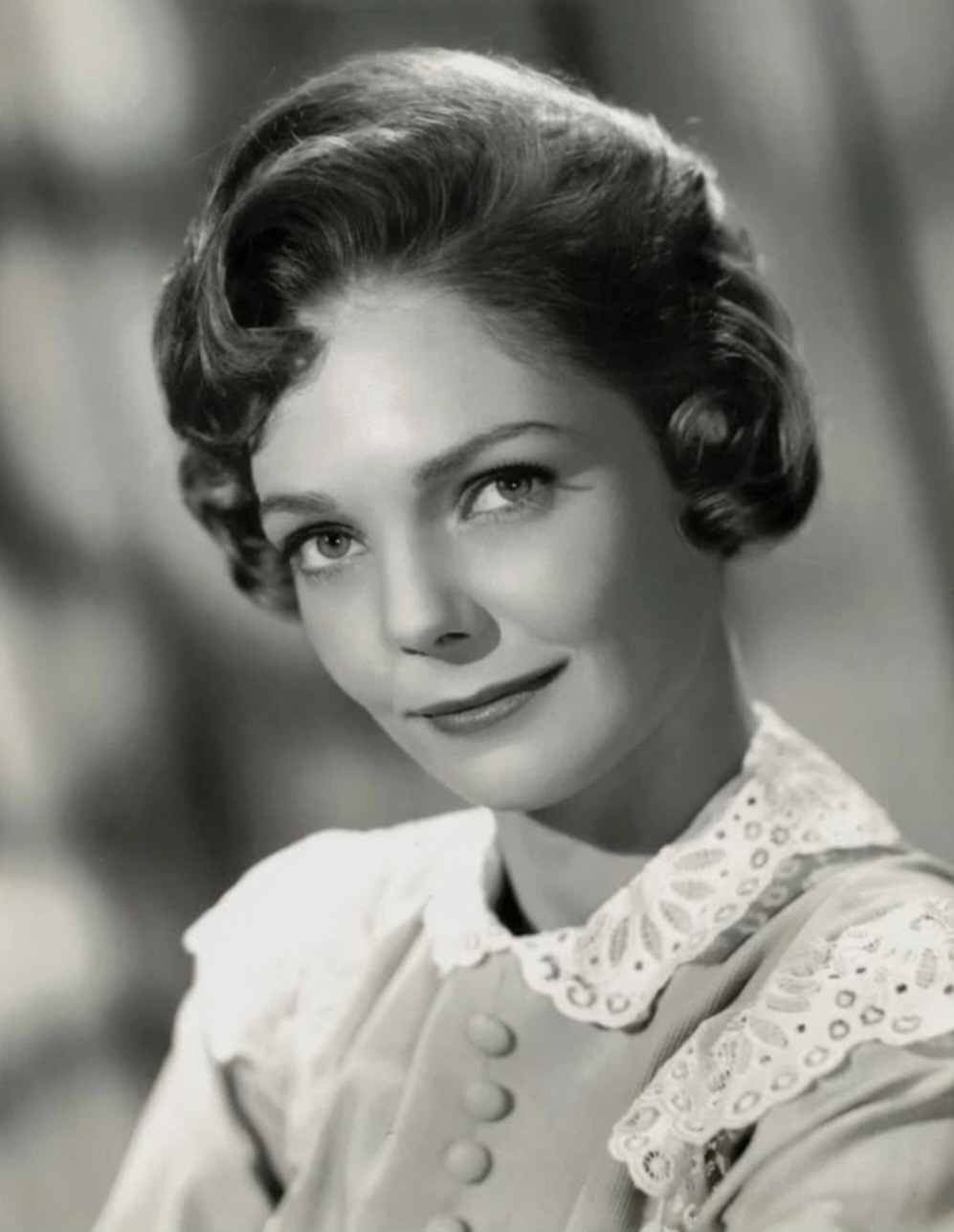
- Lewis in Outlaws, 1961
- Born: Judith Young; November 6, 1935; Los Angeles, California, U.S.
- Died: November 25, 2011 (aged 76); Gladwyne, Pennsylvania, U.S.
- Occupations: Actress; producer; author; psychotherapist
- Years active: 1958–2009
- Spouse: Joe Tinney (m. 1958; div. 1972)
- Children: 1
- Parent(s): Loretta Young (mother); Clark Gable (biological father)
- Relatives: Christopher Lewis (half-brother); Peter Lewis (half-brother); Polly Ann Young (aunt); Sally Blane (aunt); Georgiana Young (half-aunt); Clark James Gable (half-nephew); Carole Lombard (stepmother); Jean Louis (stepfather)

Judy Lewis (born Judith Young; November 6, 1935 – November 25, 2011) was an American actress, writer, producer, and therapist. She was the daughter of actors Loretta Young and Clark Gable, a relationship kept secret for many years, even from Lewis herself, who was first told she was adopted by Young.

== Early life ==
Lewis was born on November 6, 1935, in Venice, California. She was conceived while her birth parents, Loretta Young and Clark Gable, were working on the film Call of the Wild. Gable was married at the time of Lewis's conception, and Young concealed her pregnancy to avoid scandal. Young was aware that if Twentieth Century Pictures became aware of her pregnancy, the company might pressure her to have an abortion; a devout Catholic, Young considered abortion a mortal sin. Weeks after her birth, Lewis was placed in an orphanage. Lewis would spend the next 19 months in various "hideaways and orphanages" before being reunited with her mother. Young then claimed that she had adopted Lewis. When Lewis was four years old, Young married radio producer Tom Lewis, and Judy took his last name. Young and Lewis went on to have two sons, Christopher Lewis and Peter Lewis.

Lewis bore a striking resemblance to Gable, and like Gable, had ears that stuck out. When Lewis was seven years old, Young had her undergo a painful operation to pin her ears back in another attempt to hide her real parentage. In 1950, when Lewis was fifteen, her mother made another film with Gable, Key to the City. During this time, Gable came to her mother's house to visit her briefly. Gable asked Lewis about her life and then, upon leaving, kissed her on her forehead. It was the only time that Lewis ever spoke to Gable, and at the time, she had no idea that he was her father. As an adult, Lewis spoke of the confusion, isolation and alienation she felt within her own family while growing up.

== Career ==
Lewis' acting credits include appearances on TV serials such as General Hospital, Kitty Foyle, and The Doctors. Lewis played the role of Susan Ames on The Secret Storm for several seasons. She also produced the short-lived Another World spin-off, Texas, and was a script writer for NBC Daytime's Search for Tomorrow.

In 1958, Lewis guest-starred in "Attack", an episode of Mackenzie's Raiders. In 1960, she appeared in two episodes of the California National Productions ("California Studios") syndicated series The Blue Angels entitled "Tiger Blood", as a girlfriend of a U.S. Navy officer, and "Angel on Trial". In the 1961–1962 television season, she appeared as Connie Masters in Outlaws. In 1975, she guest-starred on Three for the Road.

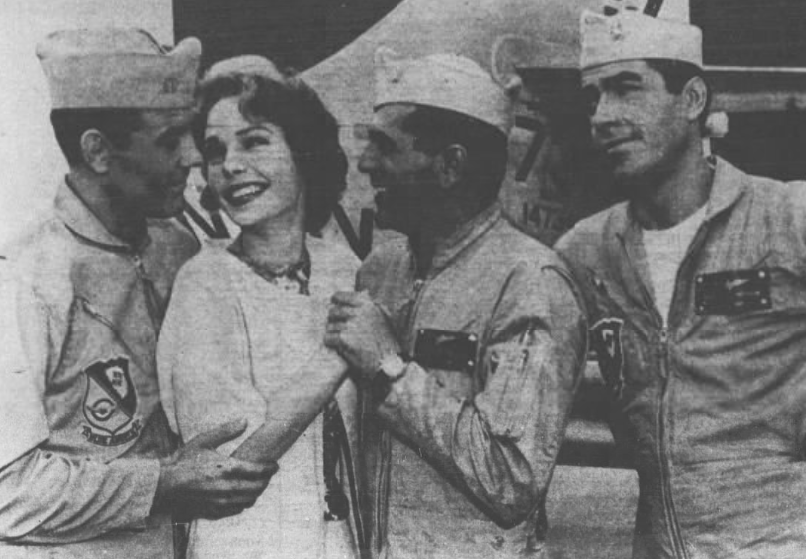
Lewis (second in the center) with Warner Jones, Don Gordon and Dennis Cross, 1961

In 1985, Lewis shared a Writers Guild of America award for several episodes of CBS's Search For Tomorrow.

Lewis obtained bachelor's and master's degrees in clinical psychology from Antioch University in Los Angeles, became a licensed family and child counselor in 1992, and worked as a psychotherapist with a specialty in foster care and marriage therapy.

== Personal life, death, and subsequent revelations ==
Lewis was the niece of actresses Polly Ann Young, Sally Blane, and Georgiana Young. She was also the paternal half-sister of John Clark Gable (Clark Gable's son with his fifth wife, Kay Williams) and the maternal half-sister of Christopher Lewis and Peter Lewis (Loretta's biological sons). Musician David Lindley was her maternal cousin.

After Lewis became engaged to Joseph Tinney at age twenty-three, he told her it was common knowledge that Gable was her biological father. Lewis was stunned. Lewis married Tinney in 1958. She and Tinney had one child together: a daughter named Maria. The couple divorced in 1972.

After Gable's death, Lewis, at age 31, confronted her mother about her parentage. Her mother said, "Yes, you are my sin." Young became nauseated, but acknowledged that she and Gable were Lewis's biological parents. In 1994, Lewis published a book about her life entitled Uncommon Knowledge in which she stated that Gable was her father. Young refused to speak with her for three years after the book was published. Loretta Young died on August 12, 2000, at age 87. Her autobiography, published posthumously, confirmed that Gable was indeed Lewis's father.

Lewis died of cancer at age 76 on November 25, 2011, in Gladwyne, Pennsylvania and is interred at Mount Vernon Cemetery in Philadelphia.

In 2015, Linda Lewis, the wife of Loretta Young's son Christopher, publicly stated that Young had said at age 85 that Judy was conceived in an act of date rape:

"Young loved to watch Larry King Live, which is most likely what prompted her to first ask her friend, frequent houseguest, and would-be biographer, Edward Funk, and then her daughter-in-law, Linda Lewis, to explain the term "date rape.” As Lewis recalled from her Jensen Beach, Florida, home this April, sitting next to her husband, Chris — Young's second born — and flanked by Young's Oscar and Golden Globe, it took tact to explain, in language that an 85-year-old could understand, what “date rape” meant. “I did the best I could to make her understand,” Lewis said. “You have to remember, this was a very proper lady."

"When Lewis was finished describing the act, Young's response was a revelation: 'That's what happened between me and Clark.' "

According to on-location reports, Gable and Young had been flirting quite heavily, but did not act on this in public or on set. According to Young herself, "she fell in love a bit with her co-stars." Their only sexual intimacy was on an overnight train ride back from their on-location shooting, when Gable visited Young in her sleeping compartment. At the time, Gable was married, and Young had ended an affair with Spencer Tracy.

The family remained silent about the conversation until Young and Lewis were both deceased. According to Edward Funk, before learning of the concept of date rape, Young had believed it was a woman's job to fend off men's amorous advances. Thus, she had perceived her inability to thwart Gable's attack as a moral failing on her part.
