= Georgiana Young =

American actress (1924–2007)

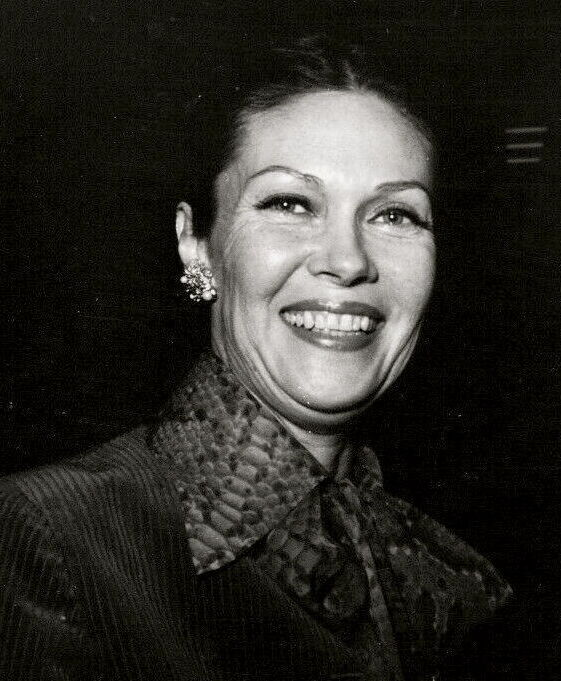
- Young in 1972
- Born: Georgiana Belzer; September 10, 1924; Los Angeles, California, U.S.
- Died: November 13, 2007 (aged 83); Los Angeles, California, U.S.
- Occupation: Actress
- Years active: 1939–1949
- Spouse: Ricardo Montalbán (m. 1944)
- Children: 4
- Family: Polly Ann Young (half-sister); Sally Blane (half-sister); Loretta Young (half-sister); Judy Lewis (half-niece); Christopher Lewis (half-nephew); Peter Lewis (half-nephew)

Georgiana Young (née Belzer; September 10, 1924 – November 13, 2007) (Note: Sources vary regarding Young's birthdate; most state her birth year as 1924 with different dates, some noting September 10, and others September 30.) was an American actress and the maternal younger half-sister of actresses Loretta Young, Polly Ann Young and Sally Blane. She had a brief career in film, appearing alongside her sisters in the biographical drama The Story of Alexander Graham Bell (1939), followed by bit parts in two other films.

== Biography ==
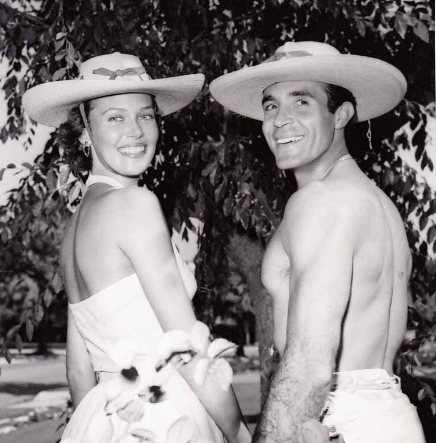
Young with husband Ricardo Montalbán (c. 1950)

Georgiana Young was born in 1924, the daughter of George Uncus Belzer and Gladys Royal (formerly Young). She was raised Roman Catholic, along with her half-sisters, actresses Loretta Young, Polly Ann Young and Sally Blane. At age thirteen, she was signed to a seven-year film contract. Her first acting role was a minor part in Mad About Music with Deanna Durbin, though her scenes were ultimately cut from the film.

Her acting career was short-lived, though she appeared in a further three films. Her debut role was as Berta Hubbard, sister of Mabel Gardiner Hubbard, in Irving Cummings's 1939 biographical film The Story of Alexander Graham Bell, opposite her half-sisters Loretta (as Mabel), Sally and Polly Ann. She would later have bit parts in two other films: No, No, Nanette (1940) and Border Incident (1949), the latter of which starred her husband, actor Ricardo Montalbán, whom she married in 1944.

== Personal life ==
After seeing her performance in The Story of Alexander Graham Bell (1939), 18-year-old Ricardo Montalbán – who split his time between his schooling in Los Angeles (living with his brother) and working in his father's store in Torreón, Mexico – became enamored of the 15-year-old Young.

Montalbán had started his own stage and film career when the two later met on a blind date, with Montalbán proposing that evening, later stating "It took a week to persuade her." They married in 1944, and had four children together.

Georgiana Young (also known as Georgiana Young Montalbán and Georgiana Young de Montalbán) died in 2007, aged 83, of undisclosed causes.

== Filmography ==
Year	Title	Role	Notes
1939	The Story of Alexander Graham Bell	Berta Hubbard	
1940	No, No, Nanette	Show Girl	Uncredited
1949	Border Incident	Woman	Uncredited
1972	This Is Your Life	Herself	Episode "Don Rickles"

== Bibliography ==
- Capace, Nancy (2001). Encyclopedia of Utah. North American Book Distributors. ISBN 978-0-403-09609-1.
- Davis, Ronald L. (2001). Duke: The Life and Image of John Wayne. University of Oklahoma Press. ISBN 0-8061-3329-5.
- Porter, Darwin (2001). Hollywood's Silent Closet. Georgia Liter Association. ISBN 978-0-966-80302-0.
- Shilling, Donovan A. (2013). Rochester's Movie Mania. Pancoast Publishing. ISBN 978-0-982-10904-5.
- Vazzana, Eugene Michael (2011). Silent Film Necrology (2nd ed.). McFarland. ISBN 978-0-786-44515-8.
