= The Story of Alexander Graham Bell =

1939 film by Irving Cummings

- Directed by: Irving Cummings
- Written by: Ray Harris
- Screenplay by: Lamar Trotti; Boris Ingster; Milton Sperling
- Produced by: Darryl F. Zanuck; Kenneth Macgowan
- Starring: Don Ameche; Loretta Young; Henry Fonda; Charles Coburn
- Cinematography: Leon Shamroy
- Edited by: Walter A. Thompson
- Music by: Ernst Toch
- Production company: Cosmopolitan Productions
- Distributed by: 20th Century Fox
- Release date: April 14, 1939
- Running time: 98 minutes
- Country: United States
- Language: English

The Story of Alexander Graham Bell is a somewhat fictionalized 1939 biographical film of the famous inventor. It was filmed in black-and-white and released by Twentieth Century-Fox. The film stars Don Ameche as Bell and Loretta Young as Mabel, his wife, who contracted scarlet fever at an early age and became deaf.

The first half of the film concentrates on the hero's romantic, financial, and scientific struggle.

Henry Fonda is notable in a co-starring role as Mr. Watson, who hears the first words ever spoken over the telephone. In a pivotal scene, Bell (Don Ameche), while working on the telephone, accidentally spills acid onto his lap and shouts in pain, “Mr. Watson, come here! I want you!” Watson, barely able to contain his own excitement, rushes into the room and stammers out the news that he heard Bell calling out to him over the telephone receiver. Bell has Watson repeat his own words to him to confirm it, and the two men begin hopping around the room, with Watson yelling out a war whoop.

The last part depicts the legal struggle against Western Union over patent priority in the invention of the telephone, ending with a courtroom victory. The final scene has the hero contemplating crewed flight, under his wife's adoring gaze.

The film led to the use of the word "ameche" as juvenile slang for a telephone, as noted by Mike Kilen in the Iowa City Gazette: "The film prompted a generation to call people to the telephone with the phrase: 'You're wanted on the Ameche.'" Such an identity between Ameche and the telephone was forged, that in the 1940 film Go West, Groucho Marx proclaims, "Telephone? This is 1870, Don Ameche hasn't invented the telephone yet."

== Plot ==
The film opens on a get-together, when a conversation arises about the main character, Alexander Graham Bell. The conversation is quite critical of Bell, with the general consensus being that he was a fool. When Bell enters, the partygoers treat his intelligence and his demonstration of how sound works as an amusing party trick.

Bell is given the prospect of helping Gardiner Hubbard's deaf daughter with speech after showing Hubbard his capabilities of teaching a deaf child to communicate using a glove with letters on it. It's an offer Bell accepts. On his way to the Hubbard house, Bell loses his balance when a young lady on a sled speeds by him. He scolds her for being so reckless, telling her that she could have ruined his telegraph instrument. When explaining his invention to Mr. Hubbard, Bell fails to capture his interest.

Mr. Hubbard introduces Bell to his daughters, including his deaf daughter, Mabel Hubbard, who happens to be the reckless sled-rider. The next day, Bell and Mabel, while on a wagon ride, talk about Bell's plans with the telegraph. Bell admits to Mabel that he is no longer interested in the telegraph, and this is when he introduces the idea of the telephone.

After Bell is kicked out of his home, he moves into his assistant Thomas Watson's apartment. While trying to fine-tune his invention, Bell discovers he is missing a spring that Watson misplaced, or rather didn't purchase because he bought something to eat instead. This leads to a heated argument, albeit short-lived, for Watson plucks the magnetized steel, which sends a tune to the hand-held device that Bell is holding, and turns their anger and frustration into ecstatic joy.

Bell makes his way to the Hubbard home to let everyone know of his monumental discovery. After telling Mabel of his discovery, he asks her to marry him, and she accepts. Problems arise when he tells Mr. Hubbard, who tells Bell that he is not financially responsible enough to marry Mabel; as well as bouncing from idea to idea, never finishing his projects. Mabel pulls him aside and tells him to finish the telephone despite what her father said. Bell later laments about how is he going to build a receiver that interprets the vibrations sent through his contraption. He develops an idea based on how human ears interpret sound, finally developing a receiver in the process.

Bell places water in the receiver cup to try transmitting the sound. When the water is unsuccessful, he adds a small amount of sulfuric acid to turn the water into a better conductor. In the process, Bell spills acid on his leg and shouts, "Mr. Watson, come here, I want you!" The receiver picks up the sound, and Watson finally hears Bell through the telephone for the first time.

Bell sets up a public demonstration of the telephone. The invention is received with laughter and ridicule, but that does not stop Bell. Soon, there are hundreds of phones, but there is still a problem: Bell and the Hubbards are losing money. One offer arises that might help with the financial problem: England requests that Bell present the telephone to Queen Victoria. Bell's idea is to convince the Queen to install a telephone in her palace, inspiring the whole world to follow suit.

After a very successful demonstration, the Queen has a telephone installed in Buckingham Palace. Bell returns to the hotel to tell Mabel of the great news but is only met with bad news. Mabel tells Bell that a new company organized by Western Union is trying to claim ownership of the invention of the telephone. Bell files a lawsuit against American Speaking Telephone Company. During the proceedings, American Speaking Telephone Company alleges that Bell has a fraudulent patent and that one of their engineers is the actual inventor. The judge gives Bell some time to find any kind of paperwork that proves he is the inventor.

Bell, thinking he lost, decides to go home, but Mabel arrives at the last minute to deliver the paper that proves Bell's claim to the telephone. As the court goes into consideration, Bell still thinks he lost the case. Out of nowhere, Western Union representatives show up to tell him they are dropping the suit. They had conducted an internal investigation and found that their engineer had fabricated the claim in an attempt to make both Western Union and Bell look bad. Western Union releases all ownership of the telephones it owns to Bell. The company proposes a deal with Bell that will let it continue to use the telephones, which in turn will create a very lucrative business partnership. Bell accepts the offer, making him a very rich man.

== Cast ==
- Don Ameche as Alexander Graham Bell
- Loretta Young as Mabel Hubbard Bell
- Henry Fonda as Thomas A. Watson
- Charles Coburn as Gardiner Greene Hubbard
- Gene Lockhart as Thomas Sanders
- Spring Byington as Mrs. Hubbard
- Sally Blane as Gertrude Hubbard
- Polly Ann Young as Grace Hubbard
- Georgiana Young as Berta Hubbard
- Bobs Watson as George Sanders
- Russell Hicks as Mr. Barrows
- Paul Stanton as Chauncey Smith
- Jonathan Hale as President of Western Union
- Harry Davenport as Judge Rider
- Beryl Mercer as Queen Victoria
- Elizabeth Patterson as Mrs. Mac Gregor
- Charles Trowbridge as George Pollard
- Jan Duggan as Mrs. Winthrop
- Claire Du Brey as Landlady
- Harry Tyler as Joe Eliot
- Ralph Remley as D'Arcy - Singer
- Zeffie Tilbury as Mrs. Sanders
- Edward LeSaint as Banker at Demonstration (uncredited)
- Mary Field as Piano Player (uncredited)
- John Graham Spacey as Sir John Cowell (uncredited)

== Reception ==
The film released to widespread critical acclaim, with Nelson B. Bell of The Washington Post headlining: "Moves Notable Audience To Enthusiastic Applause." He also said that the film "is splendidly cast", and that it was Don Ameche's "best work by far that he has brought to the celluloids." Mae Tinee of the Chicago Daily Tribune raved that the film is "Another finely etched biography". She also noted that "Loretta Young is lovely and loveable as Bell's great white light", and ended the article, "As for staging, direction, costumes, photography — the best, my friends, the BEST!"

== See also ==
- List of films featuring the deaf and hard of hearing
