= The Man from Utah =

1934 film

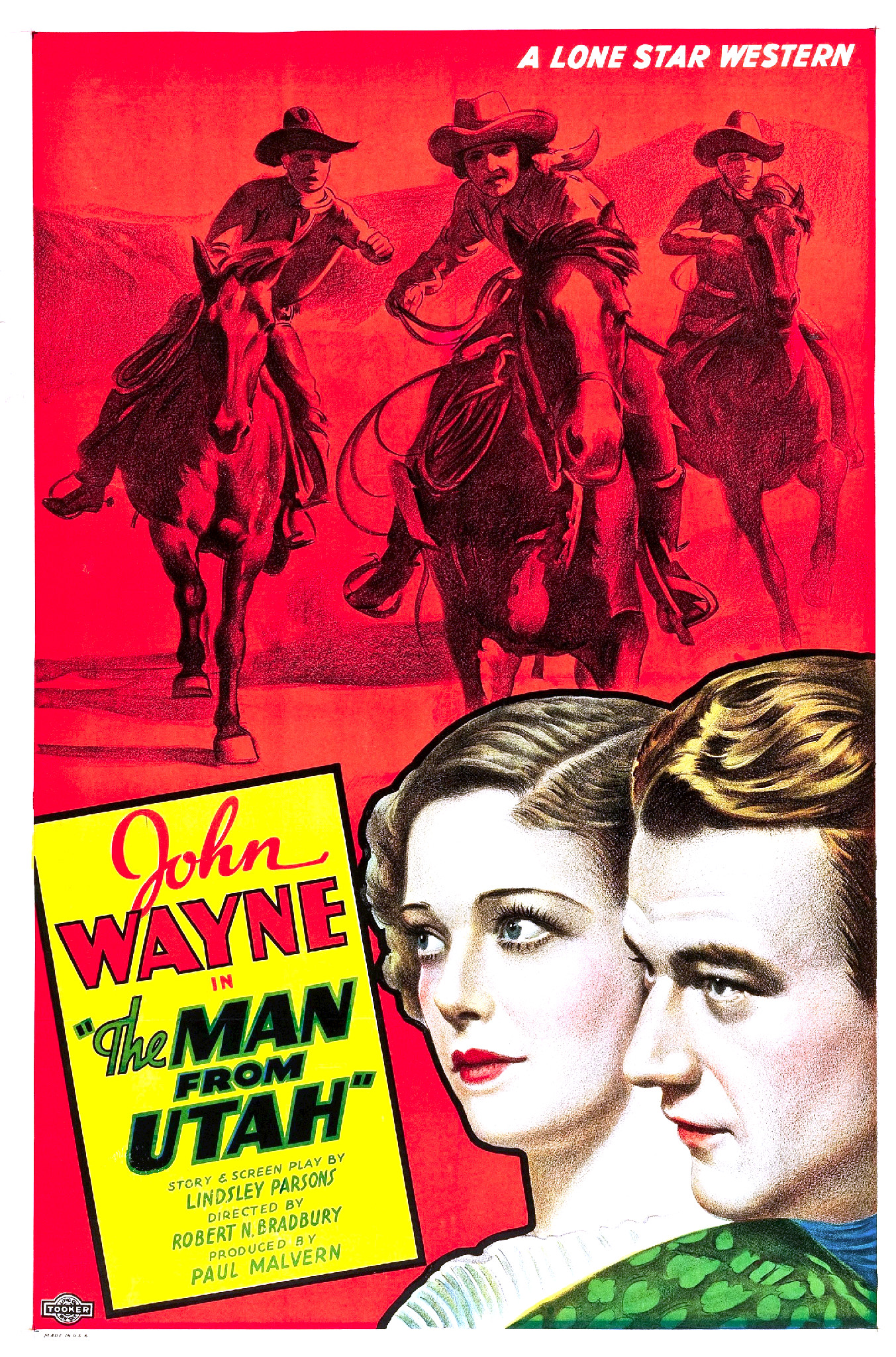
- Film poster
- Directed by: Robert N. Bradbury
- Written by: Lindsley Parsons
- Produced by: Paul Malvern
- Starring: John Wayne; George "Gabby" Hayes; Polly Ann Young
- Cinematography: Louis Clyde Stoumen
- Edited by: Carl Pierson
- Distributed by: Monogram Pictures
- Release date: May 15, 1934
- Running time: 55 minutes
- Country: United States
- Language: English

The Man from Utah is a 1934 pre-Code Monogram Western film starring John Wayne, Polly Ann Young and the stuntman/actor Yakima Canutt. It was written by Lindsley Parsons and directed by Robert N. Bradbury. Wayne has a "singing cowboy scene" in the film, wherein his voice is dubbed.

== Plot ==
An impoverished saddle tramp from Utah, John Weston, rides into a small town seeking work. He finds himself gunning down a trio of men robbing a local bank. The marshal sees the fearless, quick-drawing, sharp-shooting, hard-riding stranger as the man for the marshal's plan of discovering who is behind a crooked rodeo. A further mystery is that several rodeo riders have died of snakebite. Weston enters the rodeo as part of a plan to uncover the crooks. He manages to win every event he enters while also solving the crime, including the snakebite mystery, and winning the affection of the local judge's daughter.

== Cast ==
- John Wayne as John Weston
- Polly Ann Young as Marjorie Carter
- Anita Campillo as Dolores
- Edward Peil Sr. as Spike Barton
- George "Gabby" Hayes as Marshal George Higgins
- Yakima Canutt as Cheyenne Kent
- George Cleveland as Nevada sheriff
- Lafe McKee as Judge Carter

== Production ==
”In production from the end of March to April 3, 1934, on location at Lone Pine. The sixth Wayne-Lone Star Western under the Monogram banner.” [Wayne would film 16 with the company] ”Filmed at a cost of $12,000. Wayne earned $1250.” All of those films had been, so far, directed by Bradbury (except Sagebush Trail).

== Reception ==
”The rodeo background introduced some variety into the series but Wayne dealt predictably with the outlaws and won the hand of a judge’s daughter (Polly Ann Young).”

== See also ==
- John Wayne filmography
- List of American films of 1934
