= Guthrie, Kentucky =

- City
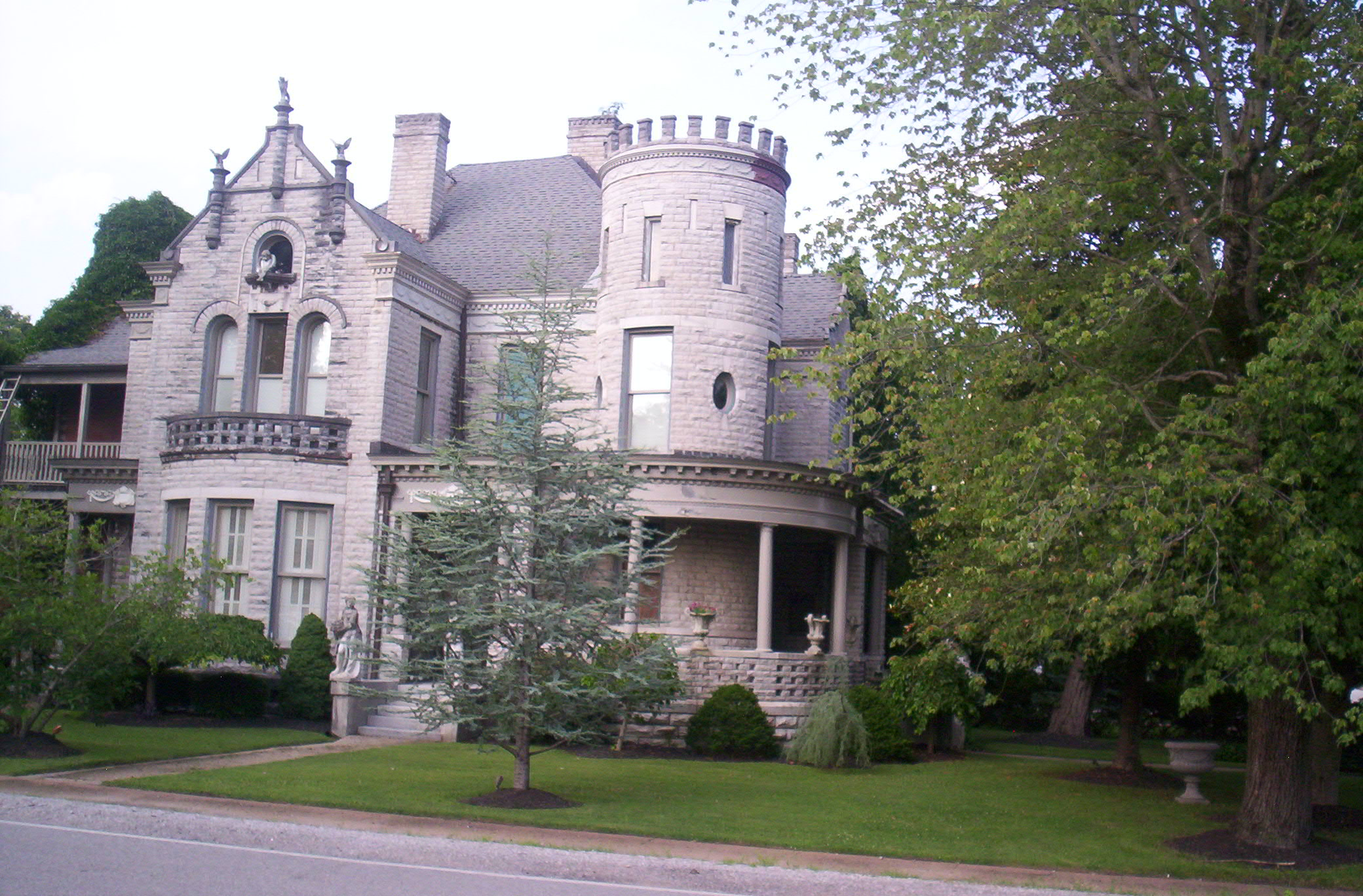
- Guthrie Castle

- Location of Guthrie in Todd County, Kentucky.
- Coordinates: 36°38′51″N 87°10′15″W
- Country: United States
- State: Kentucky
- County: Todd
- Named after: L&N Pres. James Guthrie

Government
  - Type: City Council
  - Mayor: Jimmy Covington

Area
  - Total: 2.03 sq mi (5.25 km^{2})
  - Land: 2.02 sq mi (5.24 km^{2})
  - Water: 0.0077 sq mi (0.02 km^{2})
- Elevation: 548 ft (167 m)

Population (2020)
  - Total: 1,330
  - Density: 660/sq mi (254/km^{2})
- Time zone: UTC-6 (Central (CST))
  - Summer (DST): UTC-5 (CDT)
- ZIP code: 42234
- Area code: 270
- FIPS code: 21-33562
- GNIS feature ID: 0493506
- Website: http://guthrieky.com/

Guthrie is a home rule-class city in Todd County, Kentucky, in the United States. The population was 1,330 at the 2020 census.

== Geography ==
Guthrie is located at 36°38′51″N 87°10′15″W (36.647396, -87.170725).

According to the United States Census Bureau, the city has a total area of 1.4 square miles (3.6 km^{2}), all land.

== History ==
The present location of Guthrie was the site of the Pondy Woods stagecoach stop in the 1840s; the community around it may have also been called State Line for a time, from the nearby Tennessee state line. The town was named for former Representative James Guthrie, the president of the Louisville and Nashville Railroad at its founding in 1867. Guthrie was formally incorporated by the Kentucky Assembly in 1876. The town is also the birthplace of the first United States Poet Laureate Robert Penn Warren.

== Demographics ==
Historical population
Census	Pop.	Note	%±
1880	322		—
1890	449		39.4%
1900	807		79.7%
1910	1,096		35.8%
1920	1,160		5.8%
1930	1,272		9.7%
1940	1,253		−1.5%
1950	1,253		0.0%
1960	1,211		−3.4%
1970	1,200		−0.9%
1980	1,361		13.4%
1990	1,504		10.5%
2000	1,469		−2.3%
2010	1,419		−3.4%
2020	1,330		−6.3%
U.S. Decennial Census

As of the census of 2000, there were 1,469 people, 593 households, and 377 families residing in the city. The population density was 1,079.5 inhabitants per square mile (416.8/km^{2}). There were 657 housing units at an average density of 482.8 per square mile (186.4/km^{2}). The racial makeup of the city was 67.60% White, 29.20% African American, 0.48% Native American, 0.20% Asian, 0.20% Pacific Islander, 1.36% from other races, and 0.95% from two or more races. Hispanic or Latino of any race were 2.59% of the population.

There were 593 households, out of which 34.2% had children under the age of 18 living with them, 39.5% were married couples living together, 19.9% had a female householder with no husband present, and 36.3% were non-families. 31.7% of all households were made up of individuals, and 13.3% had someone living alone who was 65 years of age or older. The average household size was 2.48 and the average family size was 3.10.

In the city, the population was spread out, with 28.8% under the age of 18, 9.5% from 18 to 24, 29.1% from 25 to 44, 18.8% from 45 to 64, and 13.8% who were 65 years of age or older. The median age was 34 years. For every 100 females, there were 92.3 males. For every 100 females age 18 and over, there were 86.5 males.

The median income for a household in the city was $25,682, and the median income for a family was $31,083. Males had a median income of $27,868 versus $20,240 for females. The per capita income for the city was $13,283. About 23.6% of families and 25.2% of the population were below the poverty line, including 31.5% of those under age 18 and 25.6% of those age 65 or over.

== Guthrie city renewal project ==
The city administration of Guthrie, Kentucky partnered with the University of Kentucky's College of Design to reform the urban plan for the city of Guthrie. In 2006, the city petitioned the University of Kentucky for help in developing a new plan for the future of the community. The College of Design accepted the project. The first project, known as the Guthrie Transportation Museum, became the hub project of the renewal effort. In December 2007, Matthew Colin Bailey, along with assistance from the College of Design, created schematic plans to revive the city. The city received multiple grants in amounts of over $1.4 million from the Commonwealth of Kentucky to begin the restoration of the downtown area and a branding campaign to improve the city's image. In 2009, the award-winning architecture firm of Deleon + Primmer was awarded the final design of the project.

== Notable people ==
- Billy Byars Sr. (1901–1965), Texas oilman, cattle rancher, and sportsman
- Kent Greenfield (1902–1978), Major League Baseball player
- Ed Holland (1918–2009), cartoonist
- Robert Penn Warren (1905–1989), Pulitzer Prize-winning novelist (All the King's Men) and poet

== See also ==
- South Guthrie, Tennessee
