= Ed Holland =

American cartoonist

Daniel Edward Holland (1918–2009), commonly known as Ed Holland, was an American editorial cartoonist. Holland spent the bulk of his career with the Chicago Tribune.

== Education and career ==
Holland was born in Guthrie, Kentucky on February 2, 1918. He attended David Lipscomb College (1936–1938) and the Chicago Academy of Fine Arts (1938–1939). He worked briefly for the Nashville Banner (directorial cartoonist, 1939–1941) before serving in the United States Army Air Forces during World War II (1941–1945).

After leaving the military, Holland took a position with the Chicago Tribune, where he remained for the rest of his career apart from one four-year stint with the Washington Times-Herald (1950–1954). He was promoted to chief editorial cartoonist at the Tribune in 1972 and retired in 1975.

== Awards, recognition and death ==
Holland received the Freedom Foundation's Certificate of Merit in 1949, and medals in 1950, 1951, and 1958. His cartoons were featured many times, in color, on page one of the Chicago Tribune, a rare distinction for an editorial cartoonist of that era.

Ed Holland died on August 18, 2009.
