= The Genesis Children =

1972 art film by Anthony Aikman and Billy Byars Jr.

- 1972 advertisement in the Los Angeles Times
- Directed by: Anthony Aikman
- Written by: Anthony Aikman; Billy Byars Jr. Barbara Smith
- Produced by: Billy Byars Jr.
- Starring: Vincent Child; Greg Hill; Bubba Collins; Peter Glawson; David Johnson; Jack Good; Mike Good; Max Adams; Butch Burr
- Narrated by: Jeremy Hoenack
- Cinematography: Bill Dewar
- Edited by: Jeremy Hoenack
- Music by: Jerry Styner
- Release date: August 4, 1972
- Running time: 85 minutes
- Country: United States
- Language: English

The Genesis Children, originally titled ? before its release, is a 1972 American art film. It was directed by Anthony Aikman and co-written by Aikman and Billy Byars Jr., with the narration written by Barbara Smith. It was a production of Lyric Films International and Byars and Associates.

The movie premiered on August 4, 1972, at the Encore Theater at 5308 Melrose Avenue in Los Angeles, California. Although it was called "very benign" by Aaron Stern of the MPAA, it received an X rating due to lengthy full nudity scenes of adolescent boys.

== Synopsis ==
The Genesis Children is a non-narrative film with a theme of "the unity of mankind".

The story is about eight American students of an international school in Rome who follow a want ad placed by a mysterious man: "Wanted: boys to act in a play, to be performed before God." This leads them to a cove at the Palinuro natural arch in southern Italy, where in the beginning they appear overwhelmed by a sensation of paradisiacal ease and freedom. Throughout the "play", the boys venture into diverse, sometimes bizarre, actions to overcome growing "boredom, hunger, and homesickness" (as their problems are diagnosed by one of them), as well as fear. In the course of the following days, problems arise, and clothing is more and more restored. Finally, the group divides, with five of the boys abandoning their play and three of them staying.

== Reception ==
The film was compared to Lord of the Flies and was described by critics as "simplistic and pretentious".

== See also ==
- List of American films of 1972
