= Polly Ann Young =

American actress (1908–1997)

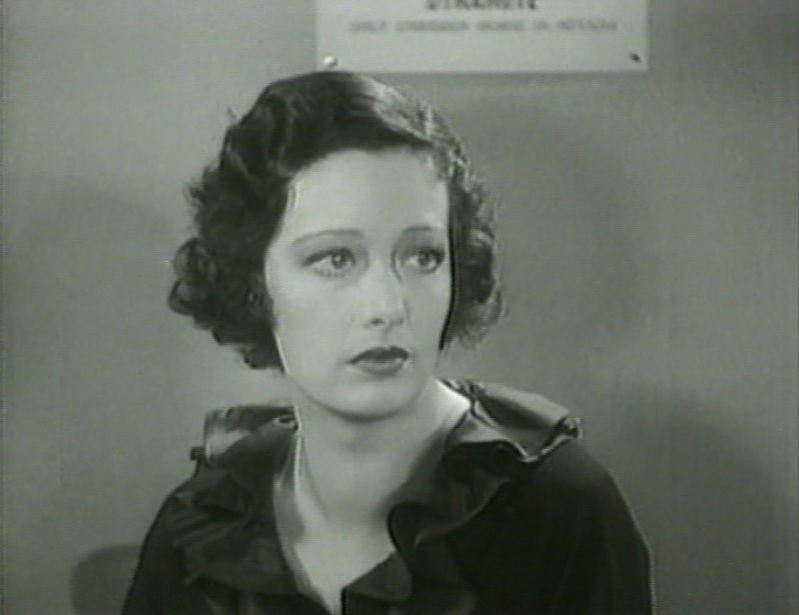
- Young in 1934
- Born: October 25, 1908; Denver, Colorado, U.S.
- Died: January 21, 1997 (aged 88); Los Angeles, California, U.S.
- Occupation: Actress
- Years active: 1917–1941
- Spouse: Carter Hermann (m. 1936; died 1981)
- Children: 4
- Relatives: Loretta Young (sister); Sally Blane (sister); Georgiana Young (half-sister); Judy Lewis (niece); Christopher Lewis (nephew); Peter Lewis (nephew)

Polly Ann Young (October 25, 1908 – January 21, 1997) was an American actress.

== Biography ==
Young was born in Denver, Colorado. Actresses Loretta Young and Sally Blane were her sisters. From 1917 to 1941, she was featured in over 40 movies, some of them minor, uncredited roles. Among her more notable movie roles was as John Wayne's leading lady in The Man from Utah (1934). Her last film was the Poverty Row horror movie Invisible Ghost with Bela Lugosi in 1941.

Young married Carter Hermann on February 5, 1936, and they had four children. Her husband died in the 1980s, and she died in 1997 of cancer in Los Angeles, California, aged 88. Her sisters Sally and Loretta also died of cancer. She was a half-sister to Georgiana Young, wife of actor Ricardo Montalbán. Young was a Roman Catholic, the same as her sisters and mother, and was educated in a convent school.

== Partial filmography ==
- Sirens of the Sea (1917) - Child (as a child actress)
- A Good Loser (1920)
- The Sheik (1921) - Arab Child (uncredited) (as a child actress)
- The Masks of the Devil (1928) - Dancer
- The Bellamy Trial (1929)
- Tanned Legs (1929) - Dancer (uncredited)
- Rich People (1929) - Sally Vanderwater
- They Learned About Women (1930) - Train Passenger (uncredited)
- Children of Pleasure (1930) - Society Girl at Party (uncredited)
- Our Blushing Brides (1930) - A Mannequin
- Road to Paradise (1930) - Mary / Margaret (voice, uncredited)
- Going Wild (1930) - Brunette Book Buyer (uncredited)
- Up for Murder (1931) - Winter's Daughter (uncredited)
- This Modern Age (1931) - Parisian Party Girl (uncredited)
- The One Way Trail (1931) - Mollie
- The Circus Show-Up (1932, Short) - Irene Duval
- Lady with a Past (1932) - Party Guest (uncredited)
- Murders in the Rue Morgue (1932) - Girl (uncredited)
- Disorderly Conduct (1932) - A Friend of Phyllis's (uncredited)
- Stolen Sweets (1934) - Betty Harkness
- The Man from Utah (1934) - Marjorie Carter
- Elinor Norton (1934) - Publisher's Staff (uncredited)
- The White Parade (1934) - Hannah Seymour
- Sons of Steel (1934) - Rose Mason
- The Crimson Trail (1935) - Kitty Bellair
- Happiness C.O.D. (1935) - Eleanor
- Thunder in the Night (1935) - Torok's Sweetheart (uncredited)
- His Fighting Blood (1935) - Doris Carstairs
- Hitchhike to Heaven (1936) - Jerry Daley
- The Border Patrolman (1936) - Patricia Huntley
- I Cover Chinatown (1936) - Myra Duryea
- Mystery Plane (1939) - Anita
- The Story of Alexander Graham Bell (1939) - Grace Hubbard
- Wolf Call (1939) - Natalie
- Port of Hate (1939) - Jerry Gale
- Murder on the Yukon (1940) - Joan Manning
- Turnabout (1940) - Miss Gertie Twill
- The Last Alarm (1940) - Joan Hadley
- Road Show (1941) - Helen Newton
- Invisible Ghost (1941) - Virginia Kessler (final film role)
