= Billy Byars Sr. =

American oilman, cattle rancher, and sportsman (1901–1965)

- Born: William Goebel Byars; October 6, 1901; Guthrie, Kentucky, U.S.
- Died: October 6, 1965 (aged 64); Tyler, Texas, U.S.
- Other name: B. G. Byars
- Occupations: Oilman; cattle rancher; sportsman
- Children: 2 (including adopted Billy Byars Jr.)

William Goebel Byars (October 6, 1901 – October 6, 1965) was an American oilman, cattle rancher, and sportsman. He additionally served as director of the Tyler Bank and Trust Company, and was on the boards of several Texas colleges and organizations.

Besides his wealth, which at one point amounted to over $30 million, Byars was noted as a personal friend of FBI director J. Edgar Hoover and President Dwight D. Eisenhower.

== Personal life ==
Byars was born in Guthrie, Kentucky, on October 6, 1901, to Alexander Byars and Sammie Byars (née Grant). He had three sisters. Byars moved from Kentucky to Texarkana before settling in Tyler, Texas, in 1932.

In 1930, Byars married Emily O'Dwyer Byars (1903–1979), an "elegant but colorful woman" of Irish descent, with whom he had one daughter, Emily Elizabeth Byars. He had one son, whom he adopted through the Edna Gladney Foundation, film producer later-turned child pornographer Billy Byars Jr. (b. 1936).

In 1956, Byars was named a Companion of the Order of the White Elephant by Pote Sarasin of Thailand for "valuable contribution toward the success of [the] Thai Goodwill Mission to the United States".

Byars died in Tyler on October 6, 1965, his 64th birthday. His funeral was held at Immaculate Conception Catholic Church in the city.

== Business history ==
Byars began working in oil fields at age 15 in December 1917. In The New Yorker, he recalled, "I remember it was cold and muddy. Sleeping in tents. I was a roughneck, working on a rig." He would later acquire his own drilling rig and expand his operation from there.

Reputed for his wealth, Byars had reportedly made his first million dollars at age 20, before going broke the following year and becoming a millionaire once again at age 25. As an oilman, he owned acres of oil wells under B. G. Byars Drilling Company.

As a cattle rancher, Byars specialized in the Aberdeen Angus and was the operator of Royal Oaks Farm in Texas. During this period, he was a business partner of W. Alton Jones and George E. Allen. The Byars–Allen partnership liquidated on June 30, 1961, following years of Byars' failing health, financial difficulties, and Allen encountering problems with the IRS.

Byars sold and gifted cattle to President Dwight D. Eisenhower and once visited Dwight and First Lady Mamie Eisenhower at the White House. In 1958, Byars, Jones, and Allen financed Eisenhower's Gettysburg Farm after funds for the operation ran low.

Outside of cattle and oil, Byars owned racehorses and partnered in the ownership of stables. In 1962, Byars, Clint Murchison Sr., and another unnamed businessman purchased the Charles Race Track in Charleston, West Virginia, for $5.7 million.

== Political support and relationship to J. Edgar Hoover ==
In October 1952, Byars made arrangements for Wisconsin Senator Joseph McCarthy to speak in Tyler on the subject of corruption and communism.

Byars and his son were close friends of FBI director J. Edgar Hoover. The Byars shared adjacent bungalows with Hoover at Murchison's Hotel del Charro in California, where Byars Sr. recalled Hoover "saying god-awful things" about President John F. Kennedy. Byars had also once met Jack Ruby, likely through Murchison. In the hours after Kennedy's assassination, Hoover had made phone calls to three people: Robert F. Kennedy, James Joseph Rowley, and Byars.

Byars also financially backed Lyndon B. Johnson in the 1960 presidential election, though Johnson would be defeated by Kennedy on the first presidential ballot, after which he was selected by Kennedy as his running mate. Johnson would become president in 1963 following Kennedy's assassination.

In 1988, Byars Jr. recalled a conversation he allegedly had with his father on the subject of the assassination:

"I asked him, 'Do you think Lee Harvey Oswald did it?' And he stopped, and he looked at me for quite a long time. Then he said, 'If I told you what I really know, it would be very dangerous to this country. Our whole political system could be disrupted.' That's all he said, and I could see he wasn't about to say any more."

== Cited works ==
- Bainbridge, John (1961). The Super-Americans. Garden City, New York: Doubleday. ISBN 0030854881.
- Summers, Anthony (1993). Official and Confidential: The Secret Life of J. Edgar Hoover. New York City: G. P. Putnam's Sons. ISBN 0399138005.
