= Anthony Aikman =

British screenwriter, film director, and author

- Aikman at the book launch for The Eye of Itza, 1986
- Born: Anthony Robert Aikman; 3 February 1942; London, England
- Died: 8 July 2011 (aged 69); Chiang Mai, Thailand
- Education: University of Wales
- Website: anthonyaikman.frogbox.co.uk

Anthony Robert Aikman (3 February 1942 – 8 July 2011) was a British screenwriter, film director, and author.

He is best known as the director of the 1972 art film The Genesis Children.

== Personal life ==
Aikman was born in 1942 in a London air raid shelter and grew up in St Margaret's at Cliffe in Kent. By his own admission, he did not learn to read or write until the age of 11. He studied forestry at the University of Wales and graduated in 1962. A perpetual traveler, he lived in numerous countries throughout his life.

He died in Thailand on 8 July 2011.

== Books ==
- The Caves of Segada, Robert Hale, 1985, ISBN 978-0-7090-2343-2
- The Eye of Itza, Robert Hale, October 23, 1986, ISBN 978-0-7090-2750-8
- The Brokers of Doom, Robert Hale, 1987, ISBN 978-0-7090-28741

The foregoing three books form a trilogy.

- Treehouses, Robert Hale, 1988, ISBN 978-0-7855-3314-6
- The Farang, Oldham Books, 1992, ISBN 978-0-473-01654-8
- Jim Tully, White Lotus Press, 1995, ISBN 978-9748496467
- The Black Swan, Post Books, 1999, ISBN 978-974-202-049-1
- Boy, Doc, and the Green Man: Also the Fire-eater: a Short Story, Post Books, 2000, ISBN 978-974-228-006-2
- Broken Guts (Tong Sia!): A 'Rough' Medical Guide for Foreign Travellers in Thailand and S.E. Asia, BookSurge, May 31, 2007, ISBN 978-1419668333

and many more articles and short stories.

== Filmwork ==
=== Screenplay-director ===
- The Genesis Children, 1971
