= Loretta Young =

American actress (1913–2000)

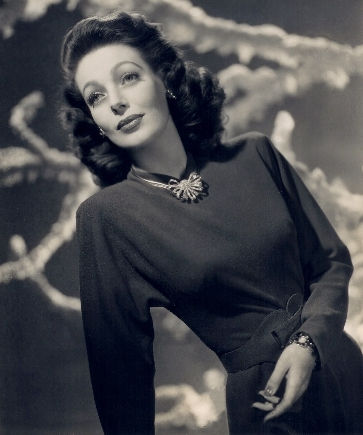
- Studio portrait of Loretta Young, 1940s
- Born: Gretchen Michaela Young; January 6, 1913; Salt Lake City, Utah, U.S.
- Died: August 12, 2000 (aged 87); Los Angeles, California, U.S.
- Resting place: Holy Cross Cemetery, Culver City
- Occupations: Actress; television host
- Years active: 1916–1994
- Known for: The Farmer's Daughter; Come to the Stable
- Spouses: Grant Withers (m. 1930; ann. 1931); Tom Lewis (m. 1940; div. 1969); Jean Louis (m. 1993; died 1997)
- Children: Judy; Christopher; Peter
- Relatives: Polly Ann Young (sister); Sally Blane (sister); Georgiana Young (maternal half-sister); David Lindley (nephew)

Loretta Young (born Gretchen Michaela Young; January 6, 1913 – August 12, 2000) was an American actress. Starting as a child, she had a long and varied career in film from 1916 to 1989. She received numerous honors including an Academy Award, two Golden Globe Awards, and three Primetime Emmy Awards, as well as two stars on the Hollywood Walk of Fame for her work in film and television.

She won the Academy Award for Best Actress for her role in the film The Farmer's Daughter (1947) and received her second Academy Award nomination for her role in Come to the Stable (1949). She also starred in films such as Born to Be Bad (1934), Call of the Wild (1935), The Crusades (1935), Eternally Yours (1939), The Stranger (1946), The Bishop's Wife (1947), and Key to the City (1950).

Young moved to the relatively new medium of television, where she had a dramatic anthology series, The Loretta Young Show, from 1953 to 1961. It earned three Primetime Emmy Awards, and was rerun successfully on daytime TV and later in syndication. She also starred in The New Loretta Young Show from 1962 to 1963. Young returned to the small screen in the 1980s starring in two NBC television movies, Christmas Eve (1986), for which she won the Golden Globe Award for Best Actress – Miniseries or Television Film, and Lady in a Corner (1989).

== Early life and education ==
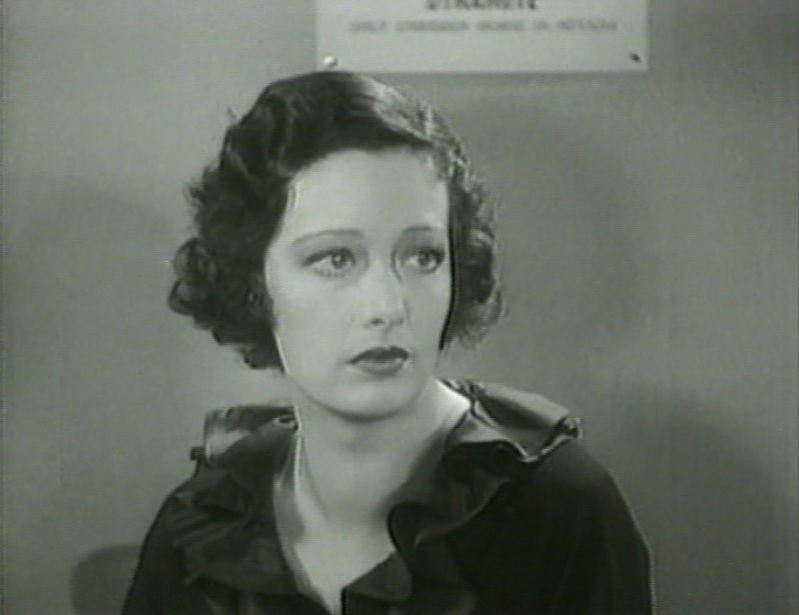
Polly Ann Young (1935)

Young was born Gretchen Michaela Young on January 6, 1913, in Salt Lake City, Utah, the daughter of Gladys (née Royal) and John Earle Young. She was of Luxembourgish descent. When she was two years old, her parents separated. A year later, her mother moved the family to Hollywood. A priest helped Gladys establish a boarding house to generate income. Gladys' brother-in-law helped Gretchen and her sisters get small parts in silent films for income.

Around 1925, Gladys met Ida Botiller Lindley, a very wealthy widow. Ida had no children, but wanted to carry on her husband's name. To do so, she proposed adopting Gretchen's younger brother John Royal Young (1914–1997), educating him to be a lawyer like her late husband. Her brother thus became John Royal Young Lindley (later John R. Lindley), and he became a lawyer. As a result, though, he did not remain in close contact with his sisters.

Gretchen and her sisters, Polly Ann and Elizabeth Jane (better known as Sally Blane), all worked as child actresses, but of the three, Gretchen was the most successful. Polly Ann Young, Sally Blane, and John R. Lindley all died in their 80s in 1997. John R. Lindley's son, David, became a well-known multi-instrumentalist rock musician.

== Career ==
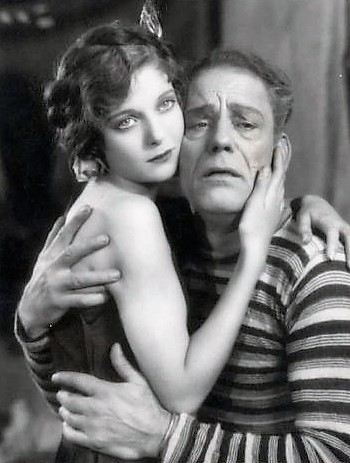
Young and Lon Chaney in the film Laugh, Clown, Laugh (1928)

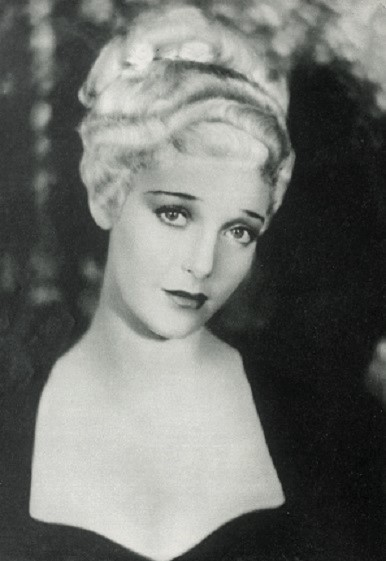
Young in 1930

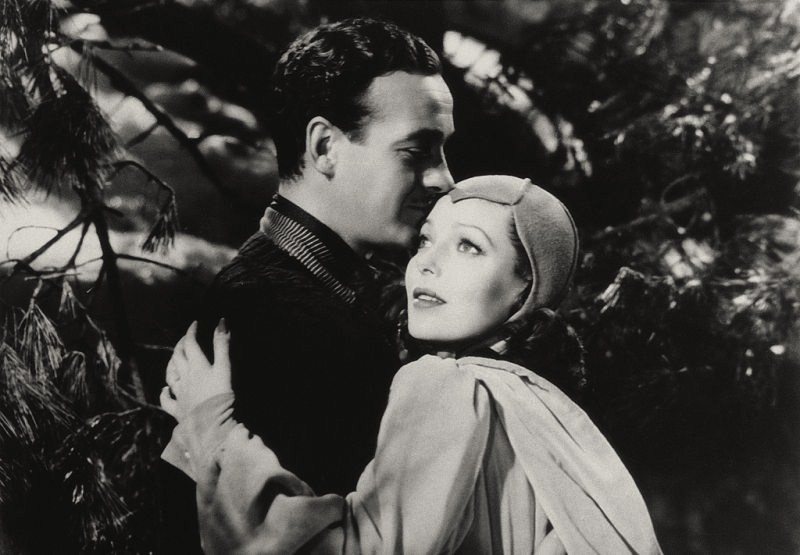
Young and David Niven in the film Eternally Yours (1939)

=== 1916–1939: Film ===
Young's first role was at the age of just three (although uncredited) in the silent film Sweet Kitty Bellairs (1916). During her high-school years, she was educated at Ramona Convent Secondary School in Alhambra, California. She was signed to a contract by John McCormick, husband and manager of actress Colleen Moore, who saw the young girl's potential. Moore gave her the name Loretta, explaining that it was the name of her favorite doll.

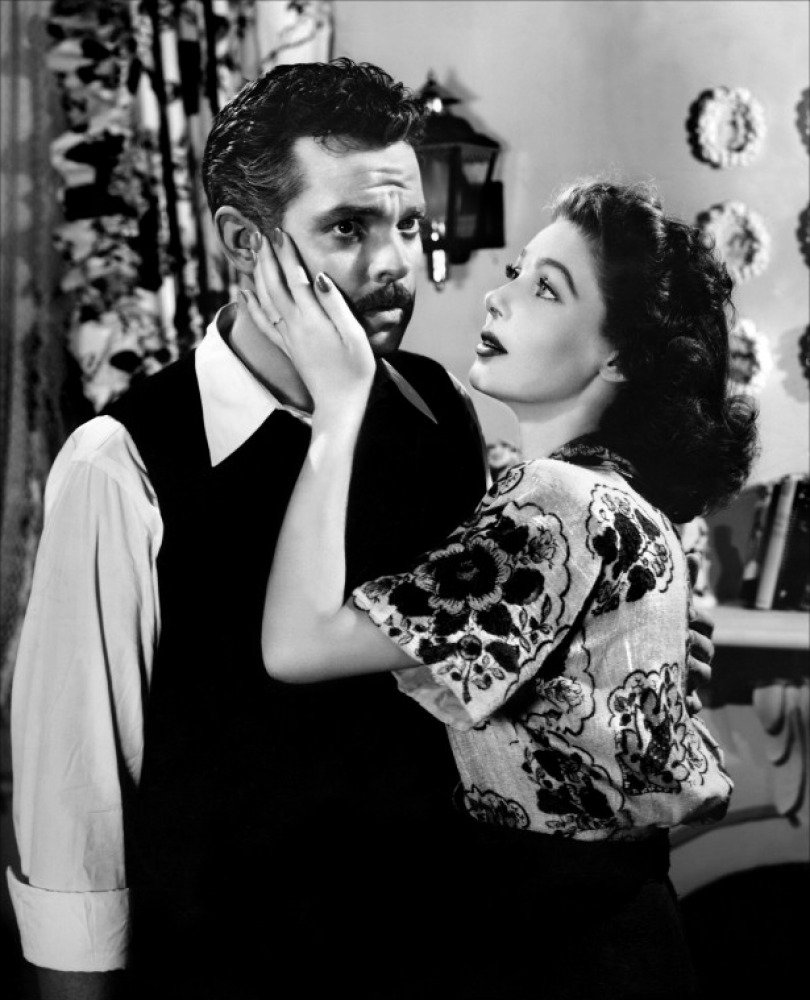
Young and Orson Welles in the film The Stranger (1946)

Young was billed as Gretchen Young in the silent film Sirens of the Sea (1917). She first appeared as Loretta Young in 1928, in the First National Pictures film The Whip Woman. That same year, she co-starred with Lon Chaney in the Metro-Goldwyn-Mayer (MGM) film Laugh, Clown, Laugh. The next year, she was named one of the WAMPAS Baby Stars. In 1930, when Young was 17, she eloped with 26-year-old actor Grant Withers; they were married in Yuma, Arizona. The marriage was annulled the next year, just as their second movie together for First National (entitled Too Young to Marry) was released.

In 1931, Young costarred with Jean Harlow and Robert Williams in his final role in the Columbia Pictures release, Platinum Blonde. In 1934, she co-starred with Cary Grant in the pre-Code drama Born to be Bad, released by Twentieth Century Pictures. This film was rejected by the Hays Office, which enforced film morality, twice before it was finally approved. The next year, Young starred opposite Clark Gable and Jack Oakie in the 1935 film adaptation of Jack London's action-adventure novel The Call of the Wild, directed by William Wellman for Twentieth Century. Also in 1935, she portrayed Berengaria, Princess of Navarre in the Cecil B. DeMille-directed historical epic The Crusades (1935) for Paramount Pictures. The film premiered at the Venice Film Festival in Venice, Italy, where it received an award for Best Foreign Film.

The following year, Young starred as Lady Helen Dudley Dearden in the MGM picture The Unguarded Hour (1936). The film was directed by Sam Wood and was based on the 1935 play of the same name by Bernard Merivale. In 1938, she played Countess Eugenie de Montijo in the romantic drama Suez, starring opposite Tyrone Power. The film was directed by Allan Dwan and produced by Darryl F. Zanuck.

=== 1940–1952: Career breakthrough ===
During World War II, Young made Ladies Courageous (1944; reissued as Fury in the Sky) for Universal Pictures. The film was the fictionalized story of the Women's Auxiliary Ferrying Squadron. The plot depicted a unit of female pilots who flew bomber planes from the factories to their final destinations. Young made as many as eight movies a year, and her films in the 1940s were among the best regarded and most memorable of her career.

In 1946, Young made The Stranger, distributed by RKO Radio Pictures. She protrayeda small-town American woman who unknowingly marries a Nazi war criminal (Orson Welles) who later tries to kill her. Welles recalled that the film's producer ordered a close-up of Young during a pivotal scene, a choice that Welles, the director, considered "fatal" to the scene's impact. Young took Welles' side, even getting her agent on the phone to support them. "Imagine getting a star's agent in to ensure that she wouldn't get a closeup!", Welles later said. "She was wonderful." Critic Richard L. Coe of The Washington Post noted in his movie review,

"The languorous Miss Young has the toughest assignment, being called on to shift from the starry-eyed bride of the early reels to the woman who must know in her heart that her husband is one of the most hated of men."

In 1947, Young won the Academy Award for Best Actress for her performance in The Farmer's Daughter, a political comedy from RKO that required her to learn a Swedish accent. Ruth Roberts, who had coached Ingrid Bergman on how to lose her Swedish accent, taught Young how to gain one. That same year, Young co-starred with Cary Grant and David Niven in the romantic comedy by RKO, The Bishop's Wife. In 1949, she received another Academy Award nomination for her role as Sister Margaret in the 20th Century Fox comedy drama Come to the Stable.

Young reunited in 1950 with Gable for the romantic comedy Key to the City. The next year, Young starred in the MGM melodrama Cause for Alarm! (1951) and the 20th Century Fox comedy Half Angel (1951). These were followed by Columbia Pictures' film noir release, Paula (1952). Also in 1952, she starred in the romance drama Because of You from Universal Pictures. In 1953, Young acted in her final theatrical film, It Happens Every Thursday. It was a comedy from Universal about a New York couple who move to California to take over a struggling weekly newspaper; her co-star was John Forsythe.

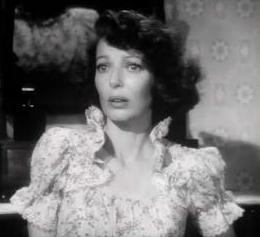
Young in the trailer for Cause for Alarm! (1951)

=== 1953–1961: The Loretta Young Show ===
Starting in 1953, Young hosted and acted in the half-hour anthology television series Letter to Loretta (later retitled as The Loretta Young Show) on the National Broadcasting Corporation (NBC). She earned three Primetime Emmy Awards and a Golden Globe Award for the program. Her trademark introduction of each episode showed her walking onto a living room set wearing a high-fashion evening gown. At the conclusion of the episode, she returned to offer a brief Bible passage or a famous quote that reflected upon the evening's story. In her contract, Young stipulated that the introductions and concluding remarks of each episode be cut for reruns. Her reason was that she did not want the gowns to date the episodes.

The Loretta Young Show was originally based on the premise that each drama answered a question from Young's fan mail. The program title was changed to The Loretta Young Show during season one (as of the episode of February 14, 1954). The "letter" concept was dropped from the series at the end of season two. Toward the end of season two, Young was hospitalized as a result of overwork. The network then replaced her with guest hosts and guest stars; Young's first appearance in the 1955–1956 season was for the Christmas show. For the remaining seasons, Young acted in half the episodes and hosted the remainder. The Loretta Young Show ran in prime time for eight years, the longest-running primetime network program hosted by a woman up to that time.

After The Loretta Young Show ended it first run, NBC repackaged it for daytime viewing as the Loretta Young Theatre from 1960 to 1964. As per the contract, the introductions and final remarks were deleted. The series also appeared in syndication into the early 1970s, before being withdrawn. In 1972, a jury in Los Angeles awarded Young $550,000 in a lawsuit against NBC for breach of contract. Filed in 1966, the suit contended that NBC had allowed foreign television outlets to rerun episodes without cutting the introductions. Young testified that showing her in "outdated gowns" had damaged her image. She had sought damages of $1.9 million.

=== 1986–1994: Final roles ===
Young came out of retirement to star in the NBC television film Christmas Eve (1986). The story revolves around an elderly woman, played by Young, who befriends the homeless and volunteers time with children. They learn that she has a terminal illness and desperately wants to reunite her three grown grandchildren before she dies. Young starred in Christmas Eve with Trevor Howard and Ron Leibman, all three of whom received Golden Globe Award nominations. Young won the Golden Globe Award for Best Actress – Miniseries or Television Film.

Young then starred in her final role, another NBC television film, Lady in a Corner (1989). She portrayed the editor-in-chief of a high-fashion magazine. Her co-stars were Brian Keith, Roscoe Lee Brown, and Bruce Davison. For her performance, Young received another Golden Globe Award nomination in the same category, but lost to Christine Lahti.

== Personal life ==
=== Marriages ===
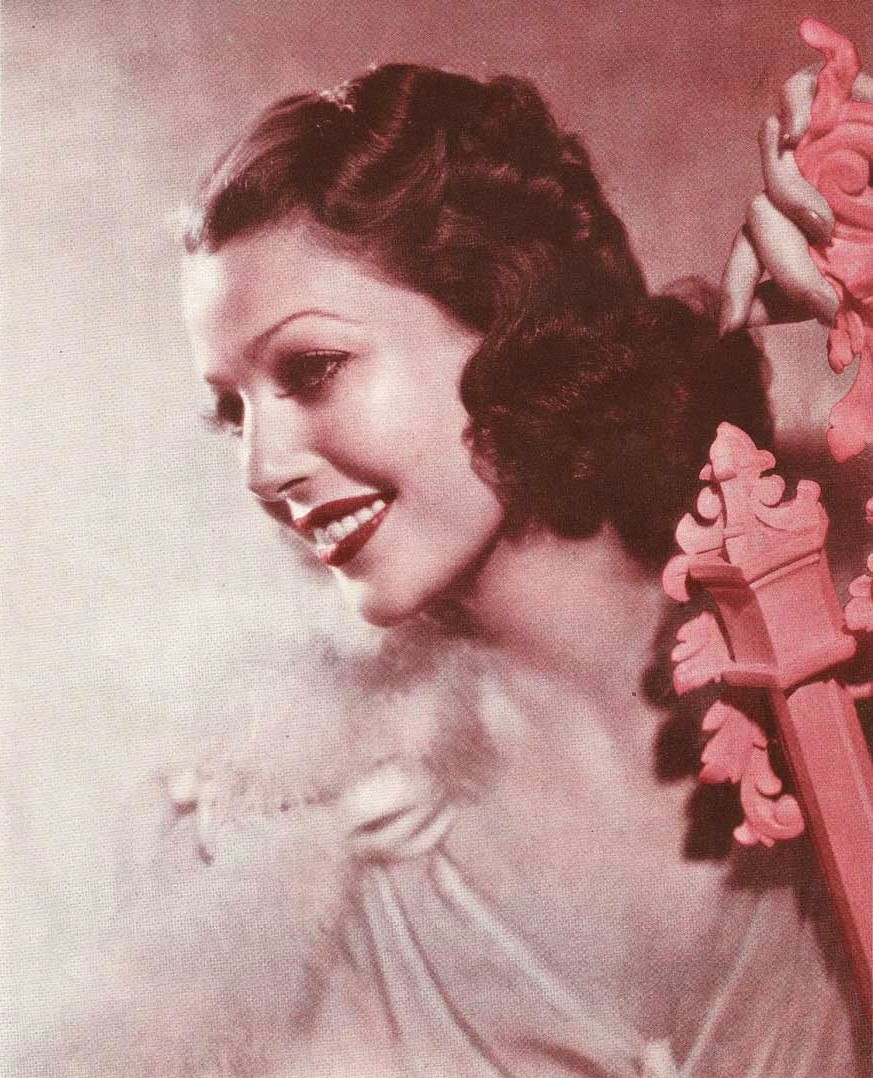
Young in 1938

Young was married three times. Her first marriage was an elopement with actor Grant Withers in 1930. This action fractured her family as Withers was non-Catholic. Young soon grew disillusioned with Withers and had the marriage annulled the following year. She then reconciled with her family.

From September 1933 to June 1934, she had a well-publicized affair with actor Spencer Tracy, her co-star in Man's Castle. Tracy, also a Catholic, was separated from his wife Louise Tracy, but would not contemplate a divorce. In 1940, Young married producer Tom Lewis. They divorced in 1969.

In 1993, Young married for the third and final time to fashion designer Jean Louis. Their marriage lasted until his death in April 1997. Young was godmother to Marlo Thomas (daughter of TV star Danny Thomas).

=== Children ===
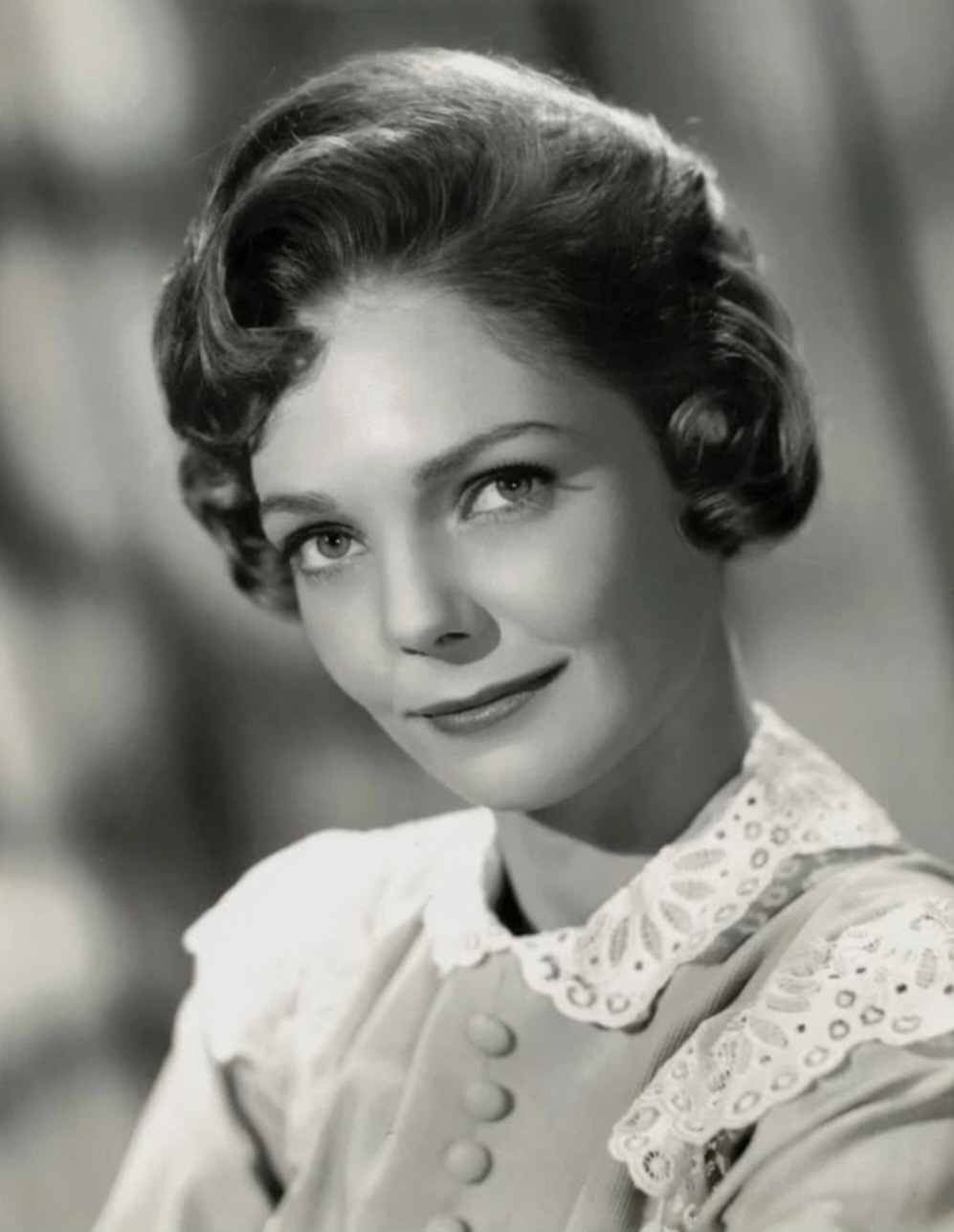
Judith Lewis (1961)

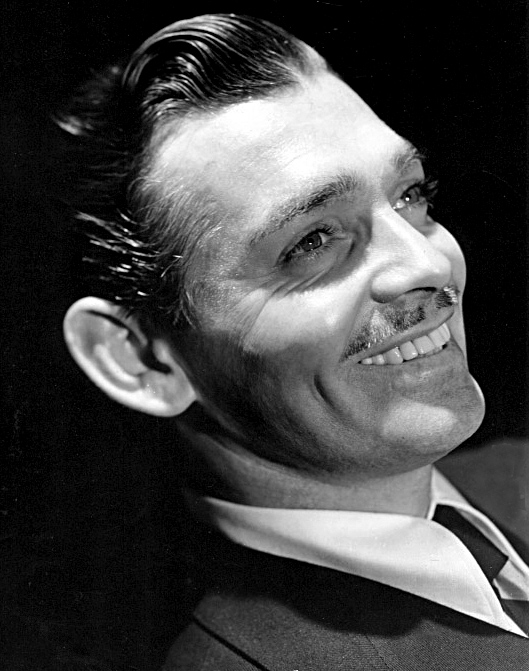
Clark Gable (1938)

Young had three children. She and Tom Lewis had two sons: Christopher Lewis, born in 1944, and Peter Lewis, born in 1945.

Young's only daughter was Judith Lewis, the daughter of Clark Gable, born in 1935. Young and Gable were the lead actors of the 1935 Twentieth Century Pictures film The Call of the Wild. Young was then 22 and Gable was 34. She was single and he was married to Maria "Ria" Langham.According to on-location reports, both Gable and Young were flirting with each other. Young herself felt that "you fell a bit in love with your co-stars." Young's biography stated that she was "wildly infatuated" with Gable.

Nothing happened between Gable and Young until they took an overnight train trip together. During the night, Gable visited Young in her separate sleeping compartment. According to Young, this was the only time that they had sex.

Young did not want her pregnancy to damage her or Gable's careers. She also knew that if Twentieth Century found out, they would pressure her to have an abortion. She believed abortion to be a mortal sin and would not consent to it. To avoid this scenario, Young, her sisters and their mother devised a plan; they would conceal the pregnancy by sending Young away, hide the baby after the birth and then pretend to adopt them.

When Young's pregnancy began to show a baby bump, she announced a "vacation" to England. After returning to California months later, she gave an interview from her bed, covered in blankets to hide her pregnancy. During the interview, she stated that her long work absence was due to a condition she had had since childhood.

Young secretly gave birth to Judith on November 6, 1935, in Venice, California. Young named her after St. Jude because he was the patron saint of difficult situations.After Judith was born, a family member sent a telegram to Gable informing him that his baby was well, "blonde and beautiful."Young's mother had told Gable that her daughter was pregnant.

Weeks after Judith's birth, Young placed her in an orphanage. Judith spent the next 19 months in various "hideaways and orphanages" before being reunited with her mother. Young then publicly announced that she had adopted a baby named Judith. After Young married Tom Lewis in 1940, Judith took Lewis as her last name.

Young and Gable starred in the film Key to the City in 1950. During its production, Gable visited the Lewis household and met 15-year-old Judith for the first and last time. As Judith grew older, she started showing a strong resemblance to Gable; her true parentage was widely rumored in entertainment circles. Young refused to confirm or comment publicly on the rumors.

When Judith was age 31 in 1966, she confronted Young about her parentage. Young finally admitted that she and Gable were her birth parents, telling her that she was "a walking mortal sin." In 1999, Joan Wester Anderson wrote Young's authorized biography. In interviews for the book, Young confirmed that she and Gable were Judith's parents. Anderson agreed to hold the biography for publication until after Young's death.

In 2015, Linda Lewis, the wife of Christopher Lewis, stated that the 85-year-old Young had told her in 1998 that she was a victim of date rape. Lewis claimed that Young learned about "date rape" from watching the Larry King Live show. Young said that she previously believed it was a woman's obligation to fend off a man's sexual advances. She had previously perceived her failure to stop Gable as her moral failing. Linda Lewis said that the family chose not to reveal this story until after Judith died in 2011.

=== Politics ===
Young was a lifelong member of the Republican Party. In 1952, she appeared in radio, print, and magazine ads in support of General Dwight D. Eisenhower in his campaign for US president. After he won the election, she attended his 1953 inauguration ceremony in Washington D.C.. She was a vocal supporter of Vice President Richard Nixon and California Governor Ronald Reagan in their successful presidential campaigns in 1968 and 1980, respectively. Young was also an active member of the Hollywood Republican Committee.

=== Charity ===
After retiring from television, Young devoted herself to volunteer work for charities and churches. She was a member of the Church of the Good Shepherd in Beverly Hills, and the Catholic Motion Picture Guild. A devout Catholic, she worked with various Catholic charities.

=== Other ===
A tobacco smoker since age eight, Young quit the habit in the mid-1980s, gaining 10 pounds (4.5 kg).Young kept a 4 ft (1.2 m)-tall silver crucifix in her home, bought in Mexico in the 1940s.

=== Illness and death ===
Young died of ovarian cancer on August 12, 2000, at the home of her maternal half-sister, Georgiana Young (the wife of actor Ricardo Montalbán) in Los Angeles, California. She was interred in the family plot in Holy Cross Cemetery in Culver City, California. Her ashes were buried in the grave of her mother, Gladys Belzer.

== Filmography ==
=== Film ===
Year	Title	Role	Notes
1916	Sweet Kitty Bellairs	unknown	Lost; uncredited
1917	The Primrose Ring	Fairy	Lost; uncredited
1917	Sirens of the Sea	Child	As Gretchen Young
1919	The Only Way	Child on operating table	
1921	White and Unmarried	Child	Uncredited
1921	The Sheik	Arab child	Extant; uncredited
1927	Naughty But Nice	Bit part	Extant; uncredited
1927	Her Wild Oat	Bit by ping pong table	Extant; uncredited
1927	Orchids and Ermine	unknown	Extant; uncredited
1928	The Whip Woman	The Girl	Lost
1928	Laugh, Clown, Laugh	Simonetta	Extant; made at MGM
1928	The Magnificent Flirt	Denise Laverne	Lost; made at Paramount Pictures
1928	The Head Man	Carol Watts	Lost
1928	Scarlet Seas	Margaret Barbour	Extant (Vitaphone track of music and effects survives). Picture elements discovered at Cineteca Italiana, Milan
1929	Seven Footprints to Satan	One of Satan's victims	Extant; uncredited
1929	The Squall	Irma	Extant, in Library of Congress
1929	The Girl in the Glass Cage	Gladys Cosgrove	Lost
1929	Fast Life	Patricia Mason Stratton	Lost (Vitaphone soundtrack discs at UCLA Film and Television)
1929	The Careless Age	Muriel	Lost
1929	The Forward Pass	Patricia Carlyle	Lost
1929	The Show of Shows	"Meet My Sister" number	Extant, in Library of Congress
1930	Loose Ankles	Ann Harper Berry	Extant, in Library of Congress
1930	The Man from Blankley's	Margery Seaton	Lost (Vitaphone soundtrack discs at UCLA Film and Television)
1930	Showgirl in Hollywood		Extant, in Library of Congress; uncredited
1930	The Second Floor Mystery	Marion Ferguson	Extant, in Library of Congress
1930	Road to Paradise	Mary Brennan/Margaret Waring	Extant, in Library of Congress
1930	Warner Bros. Jubilee Dinner	Herself	Short subject
1930	Kismet	Marsinah	Lost (Vitaphone soundtrack discs at UCLA Film and Television)
1930	War Nurse	Nurse	Extant; made at MGM; uncredited (Young's scenes deleted)
1930	The Truth About Youth	Phyllis Ericson	Extant, in Library of Congress
1930	The Devil to Pay!	Dorothy Hope	Extant; produced by Samuel Goldwyn; released by United Artists
1931	How I Play Golf, by Bobby Jones No. 8: "The Brassie"	Herself	Short subject
1931	Beau Ideal	Isobel Brandon	Extant; made at RKO
1931	The Right of Way	Rosalie Evantural	Extant, in Library of Congress
1931	The Stolen Jools	Herself	Short subject
1931	Three Girls Lost	Norene McMann	Extant
1931	Too Young to Marry	Elaine Bumpstead	Extant, in Library of Congress
1931	Big Business Girl	Claie "Mac" McIntyre	Extant, in Library of Congress
1931	I Like Your Nerve	Diane Forsythe	Extant, in Library of Congress
1931	The Ruling Voice	Gloria Bannister	Extant, in Library of Congress
1931	Platinum Blonde	Gallagher	
1932	Taxi!	Sue Riley Nolan	Extant, in Library of Congress
1932	The Hatchet Man	Sun Toya San	Extant, in Library of Congress; original title The Honorable Mr. Wong
1932	Play Girl	Buster "Bus" Green Dennis	Extant, in Library of Congress
1932	Week-End Marriage	Lola Davis Hayes	Extant, in Library of Congress
1932	Life Begins	Grace Sutton	Extant, in Library of Congress
1932	They Call It Sin	Marion Cullen	Extant, in Library of Congress
1933	Employees' Entrance	Madeleine Walters West	Extant, in Library of Congress
1933	Grand Slam	Marcia Stanislavsky	Extant, in Library of Congress
1933	Zoo in Budapest	Eve	Extant
1933	The Life of Jimmy Dolan	Peggy	Extant, in Library of Congress
1933	Heroes for Sale	Ruth Loring Holmes	Extant, in Library of Congress
1933	Midnight Mary	Mary Martin	
1933	She Had to Say Yes	Florence "Flo" Denny	Extant, in Library of Congress
1933	The Devil's in Love	Margot Lesesne	Extant
1933	Man's Castle	Trina	Extant
1934	The House of Rothschild	Julie Rothschild	
1934	Born to Be Bad	Letty Strong	
1934	Bulldog Drummond Strikes Back	Lola Field	
1934	Caravan	Countess Wilma	
1934	The White Parade	June Arden	
1935	Clive of India	Margaret Maskelyne Clive	
1935	Shanghai	Barbara Howard	
1935	The Call of the Wild	Claire Blake	
1935	The Crusades	Berengaria, Princess of Navarre	
1935	Hollywood Extra Girl	Herself	Short subject
1936	The Unguarded Hour	Lady Helen Dudley Dearden	
1936	Private Number	Ellen Neal	
1936	Ramona	Ramona	
1936	Ladies in Love	Susie Schmidt	
1937	Love Is News	Toni Gateson	
1937	Café Metropole	Laura Ridgeway	
1937	Love Under Fire	Myra Cooper	
1937	Wife, Doctor and Nurse	Ina Heath Lewis	
1937	Second Honeymoon	Vicky	
1938	Four Men and a Prayer	Miss Lynn Cherrington	
1938	Three Blind Mice	Pamela Charters	
1938	Suez	Countess Eugenie de Montijo	
1938	Kentucky	Sally Goodwin	
1939	Wife, Husband and Friend	Doris Borland	
1939	The Story of Alexander Graham Bell	Mrs. Mabel Hubbard Bell	
1939	Eternally Yours	Anita	
1940	The Doctor Takes a Wife	June Cameron	
1940	He Stayed for Breakfast	Marianna Duval	
1941	The Lady from Cheyenne	Annie Morgan	
1941	The Men in Her Life	Lina Varsavina	
1941	Bedtime Story	Jane Drake	
1942	A Night to Remember	Nancy Troy	
1943	China	Carolyn Grant	
1943	Show Business at War	Herself	Short subject
1944	Ladies Courageous	Roberta Harper	biopic of the WWII WASPs, pioneering women pilots
1944	And Now Tomorrow	Emily Blair	
1945	Along Came Jones	Cherry de Longpre	
1946	The Stranger	Mary Longstreet	
1947	The Perfect Marriage	Maggie Williams	
1947	The Farmer's Daughter	Katrin "Katy" Holstrum	Academy Award for Best Actress
1947	The Bishop's Wife	Julia Brougham	
1948	Rachel and the Stranger	Rachel Harvey	
1949	The Accused	Dr. Wilma Tuttle	
1949	Mother Is a Freshman	Abigail Fortitude Abbott	
1949	Come to the Stable	Sister Margaret	Nominated – Academy Award for Best Actress
1950	Key to the City	Clarissa Standish	
1951	You Can Change the World	Herself	Short subject
1951	Cause for Alarm	Ellen Jones	
1951	Half Angel	Nora Gilpin	
1951	Screen Snapshots: Hollywood Awards	Herself	Short subject
1952	Paula	Paula Rogers	
1952	Because of You	Christine Carroll Kimberly	
1953	It Happens Every Thursday	Jane MacAvoy	

=== Television ===
Year	Title	Role	Notes
1953–1961	The Loretta Young Show	Self - Host	162 episodes; 8 seasons
1962–1963	The New Loretta Young Show	Christine Massey	26 episodes; 1 season
1986	Christmas Eve	Amanda Kingsley	TV movie
1989	Lady in a Corner	Grace Guthrie	TV movie
1994	Life Along the Mississippi	Narrator	Voice; TV documentary

=== Radio ===
Year	Program	Episode/source
1936	Lux Radio Theatre	""Polly Of The Circus"
1940	The Campbell Playhouse	"Theodora Goes Wild"
1943	Lux Radio Theatre	"The Philadelphia Story"
1945	Cavalcade of America	"Children, This Is Your Father"
1947	Family Theater	"Flight from Home"
1950	Suspense	"Lady Killer"
1952	Lux Radio Theatre	"Come to the Stable"
1952	Family Theater	"Heritage of Home"
1953	Family Theater	"The Longest Hour"

== Awards and nominations ==
Year	Award	Category	Nominated work	Results	Ref.
1947	Academy Awards	Best Actress	The Farmer's Daughter	Won	
1949	Academy Awards	Best Actress	Come to the Stable	Nominated	
1950	Golden Apple Awards	Most Cooperative Actress	—N/a	Won	
1958	Golden Globe Awards	Television Achievement	The Loretta Young Show	Won	
1986	Golden Globe Awards	Best Actress in a Miniseries or Motion Picture Made for Television	Christmas Eve	Won	
1989	Golden Globe Awards	Best Actress in a Miniseries or Motion Picture Made for Television	Lady in the Corner	Nominated	
2020	Online Film & Television Association Awards	Television Hall of Fame: Actors	—N/a	Inducted	
1954	Primetime Emmy Awards	Best Female Star of a Regular Series	Letter to Loretta	Nominated	
1955	Primetime Emmy Awards	Best Actress Starring in a Regular Series	The Loretta Young Show	Won	
1956	Primetime Emmy Awards	Best Actress in a Single Performance	The Loretta Young Show	Nominated	
1957	Primetime Emmy Awards	Best Continuing Performance by an Actress in a Dramatic Series	The Loretta Young Show	Won	
1958	Primetime Emmy Awards	Best Continuing Performance (Female) in a Series by a Comedienne, Singer, Hostess, Dancer, M.C., Announcer, Narrator, Panelist, or any Person who Essentially Plays Herself	The Loretta Young Show	Nominated	
1959	Primetime Emmy Awards	Best Actress in a Leading Role (Continuing Character) in a Dramatic Series	The Loretta Young Show	Won	
1960	Primetime Emmy Awards	Outstanding Performance by an Actress in a Series (Lead or Support)	The Loretta Young Show	Nominated	
1961	Primetime Emmy Awards	Outstanding Performance by an Actress in a Series (Lead)	The Loretta Young Show	Nominated	
1988	Women in Film Crystal + Lucy Awards	Crystal Award for Advocacy Retrospective	—N/a	Won	

- Young has two stars on the Hollywood Walk of Fame: one for her work in television, at 6135 Hollywood Boulevard, and the other for her work in motion pictures, at 6100 Hollywood Boulevard.
- In 2011, a Golden Palm Star on the Walk of Stars, in Palm Springs, California, was dedicated to her.

== See also ==
- List of actors with Academy Award nominations
