= Christopher Lewis (screenwriter) =

American film producer and screenwriter (1944–2021)

- Lewis in 1975
- Born: August 1, 1944
- Died: January 28, 2021 (aged 76); Florida, U.S.
- Family: Loretta Young (mother); Peter Lewis (brother); Judy Lewis (half-sister); Norman Foster (uncle); Sally Blane (aunt); Polly Ann Young (aunt); Georgiana Young (half-aunt); Ricardo Montalbán (half-uncle-in-law); David Lindley (cousin)

Christopher Paul Lewis (August 1, 1944 – January 28, 2021) was an American writer and film producer, primarily for television.

== Family ==
Christopher Lewis was the elder son of Hollywood actress Loretta Young and Hollywood producer Tom Lewis. Lewis had lived on the family's Beverly Hills estate until his teen years. Lewis was a middle child. His younger brother is Peter Lewis, one of the founding members of the seminal 1960s rock band Moby Grape. Christopher and Peter Lewis were the half-brothers of actress Judy Lewis (1935–2011), daughter of Loretta Young and Clark Gable. Their aunts were the actresses Polly Ann Young and Sally Blane, who were sisters of Loretta Young. Musician David Lindley was their cousin. Blane was the second wife of actor and director Norman Foster, who was an uncle of Lewis. Actress Georgiana Young was a half-sister of his mother, and she was married to actor Ricardo Montalbán, making him a half-nephew of her and a half-nephew-in-law of him.

== Film career ==
Christopher Lewis continued as a writer and producer of films primarily for television, through The Entertainment Group, a company co-owned with his wife, Linda G. Corkran. Christopher Lewis was also a producer of horror films, including Blood Cult (1985), one of the earliest direct-to-video releases and the first to turn a significant profit.

In later years, Christopher Lewis' actress mother entrusted her son with the rights to The Loretta Young Show. He and his wife thereafter became co-producers of contemporary television broadcasts of the show, which have also been released on DVD.

=== Involvement in DOM-Lyric ===
In October 1973, Lewis was indicted on four counts of sex perversion and two counts of child molestation following a three-month investigation. Lewis, who at the time was a resident of Beverly Hills, had been identified as a film production manager for Billy Byars and Associates, which had also been responsible for the production of DOM-Lyric, which was a front for child pornography. It was found that boys between the ages of 6 and 17 years old had performed in the movies.

When Lewis was interviewed about his arrest, he mentioned that he had been spending Labor Day at his father's house when he received a phone call from a friend mentioning that individuals involved with Lyric had been arrested in regard to child pornography. Lewis was primarily concerned due to the money the Lyric enterprise had sunk into the television market in the Soviet Union.

Lewis claimed that there had been no sex between him and any underage boys involved with DOM-Lyric. He felt that he was targeted due to his relation to his mother, Loretta Young.

Lewis had gone on the record stating, "This was the kind of case the police liked, because it gave them a chance to shine in public—defending morality against perverts and pornography and child molesters and all those other loaded terms. Naturally it would behoove them to arrest me, with the built-in publicity value of my mother's name. So they would have gotten the arrest one way or another. Since they couldn't find the evidence ready-made, they simply manufactured it."

== Death ==
Christopher Lewis died on January 28, 2021, of heart issues, while wintering in Florida with his wife.
