= Hotel del Charro =

Hotel in La Jolla, California, US

Coordinates: 32.85105°N 117.25133°W

The Hotel del Charro was a resort hotel in La Jolla, California, famous for its discreet hospitality to deal-making politicians, wealthy industrialists, and Hollywood celebrities, including Richard Nixon, Joseph McCarthy, J. Edgar Hoover, John Wayne, William Powell, Elizabeth Taylor, Mel Ferrer, and La Jolla native Gregory Peck. Charro in Spanish is a costumed horseman.

== History ==
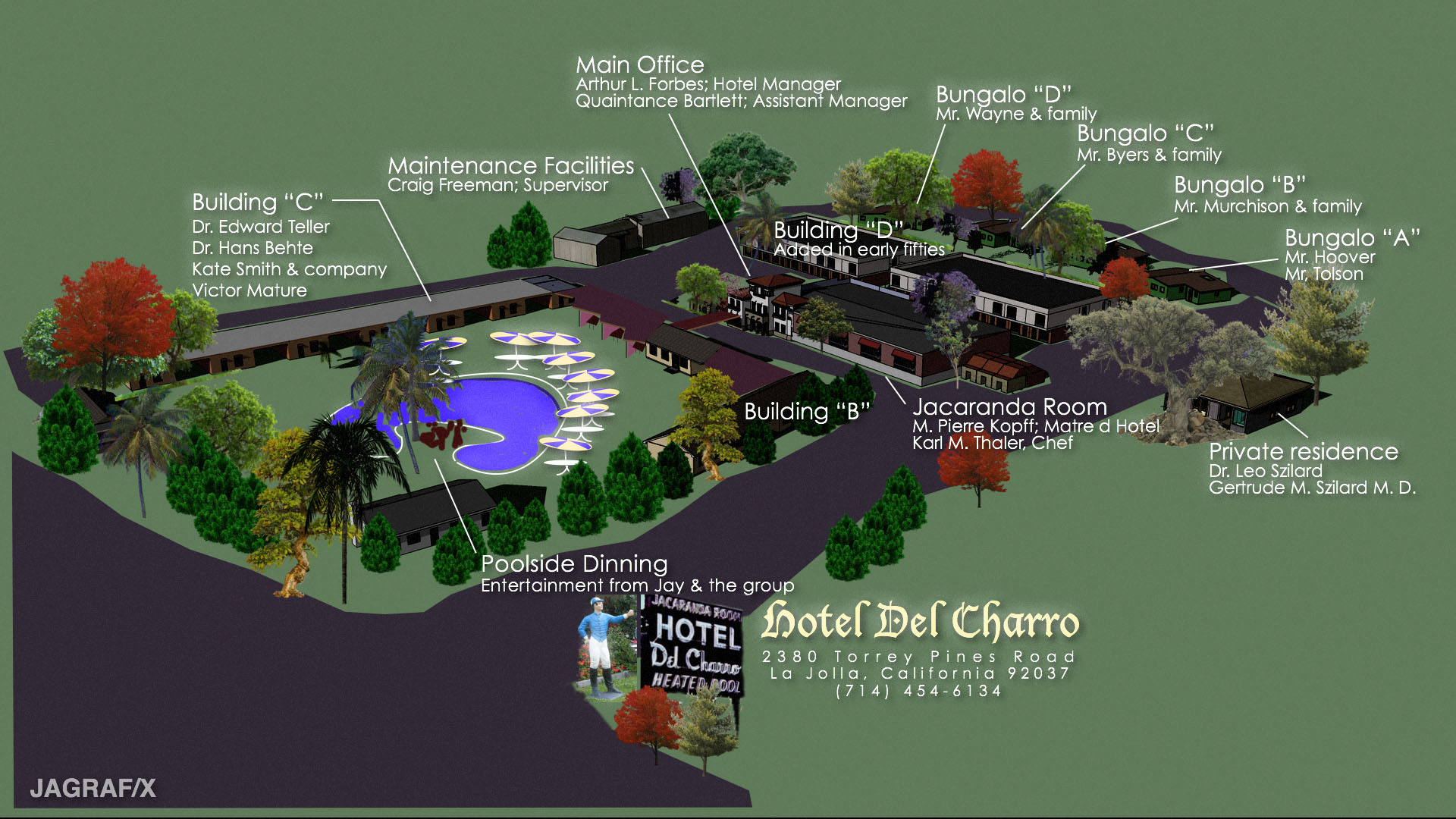
Arrangement of the Hotel del Charro, showing main buildings and bungalows with names of frequent guests

First constructed in June 1931, as a riding club, the predecessor to the del Charro was located at the junction of La Jolla Canyon (now Torrey Pines Road) and Ardath Road (now La Jolla Parkway) on a 4-acre tract. Until 1937, it was run by a Miss Jean Moore, after which it was purchased by a Captain W.W. Beckwith, who operated it as La Jolla Riding Stables.

About 1945, the property was sold to Mr. and Mrs. J.R. Marechal, of Texas, who converted it to a motor hotel with riding facilities, opening as the Rancho del Charro in 1948. Because of its proximity to La Jolla Playhouse, which had been founded by Gregory Peck, Dorothy McGuire, and Mel Ferrer in 1947, the hotel soon hosted many Hollywood and Broadway celebrities.

In 1951 the Marechals sold the property to a Nevada corporation widely understood (by insiders) to be controlled by Texas billionaires Clint Murchison and Sid Richardson. (E.g., funds for the purchase were borrowed from an insurance company owned by Murchison.) Renamed the "Hotel del Charro", the buildings were remodeled and a swimming pool was added. Thereafter, one or another of the co-owners were frequently in residence at the hotel.

== Heyday ==
“Serious citizens in La Jolla tend to feel that Hotel del Charro is a Texas enclave, not too much concerned with the town’s welfare,” observed a local in 1954. By then, the hotel was nationally famous. A New York Times piece on San Diego's post-war boom described it as a "fabulous hostelry" with every guest room having either a private patio, sundeck, or balcony. "Its restaurant, built around a huge jacaranda tree, has not one chef, but two, one imported from Scotland, the other from Palm Springs." The pool was described as "Texas-size", crescent-shaped, with pool-side cabanas.

Celebrity guests of the time included John Wayne, Elizabeth Taylor, William Powell, Jimmy Durante, and Betty Grable, along with Murchison's Texas oilman friends Effie and Wofford Cain, Emily and Billy Byars Sr., and Jodie and Pug Miller. A Texas flag flew overhead, and there was a Dow-Jones stock ticker machine in the lobby.

Close to the Del Mar racetrack (itself later acquired by Murchison and Richardson), the hotel attracted wealthy horse-race aficionados. A 1956 article in the Daily Racing Form by the hotel's own general manager gave this description of racing season at the hotel: "The chauffeurs arrive from town with the longest and blackest of the General Motors products. All are air-conditioned, about the same length as a Pullman car, and a trifle less expensive. One of these belongs to oil tycoon Roy Woods, who has a dollar for every drop of water in Niagara Falls. Bob Bowden, the 6-foot 6-inch maître d’hôtel, is discussing J. Edgar Hoover’s dinner for Vice President Nixon with the chef."

Hoover, along with companion Clyde Tolson, was accustomed to staying at the hotel for two weeks every year during racing season, occupying "Bungalow A", one of the hotel's stand-alone cabins. Columnist Jack Anderson reported in 1971 that Hoover's bill was always "comped" by the hotel's owners. According to Anderson, manager Witwer told him that over the years Hoover ran up a total tab of $15,000.

Hoover sometimes entertained guests in his bungalow, one of whom was Arthur Samish, a lobbyist who was said to represent organized crime interests in the liquor industry, and another of whom was Howard Hughes. On first entering the bungalow, Hughes reportedly asked for Hoover's assurance that the premises were not bugged.

Senator Joseph McCarthy was another frequent guest. “McCarthy was virtually on Murchison’s payroll,” manager Allan Witwer related. “He’d get drunk and jump in the pool, sometimes naked. He urinated outside his cabana, flew everywhere in Murchison’s plane.” Eventually, after one drunken brawl too many, McCarthy was declared persona non grata at the hotel. Joan Crawford was another celebrity declared persona non grata, reportedly for flirting excessively with billionaire co-owner Richardson.

Physicist Leo Szilard, famous as author of the Einstein–Szilárd letter to President Roosevelt, lived with his wife Trudy for many years until his death in 1964 in one of the more elaborate bungalows on the property. His guests from time to time included Niels Bohr, Edward Teller, and other famous physicists.

== Last days ==
The Hotel del Charro finally closed in the early 1970s. The buildings were razed and replaced by condominiums, now known as "Del Charro Woods". Some of the larger trees are original to the property.

== In popular culture ==
The Hotel del Charro plays a prominent role under the fictitious name "Rancho Descansado" in Raymond Chandler's final Philip Marlowe novel, Playback. Chandler had lived in La Jolla, which has become "Esmerelda" in the novel, for the previous decade. A cab driver character describes the place as, "Bungalows with car ports. Some single, some double. Office in a small one down front. Rates pretty steep in season." Marlowe and other characters are attacked on the premises.
