= For Money or Love =

1976 book

- Author: Robin Lloyd
- Subject: Boy prostitution in the U.S.
- Genre: Nonfiction
- Publisher: Ballantine Books
- Publication date: July 1976
- Publication place: United States
- ISBN: 978-0345255549

For Money or Love: Boy Prostitution in America is a 1976 investigative journalism book by Robin Lloyd. It became a best-seller and a Book of the Month reprint. It is introduced by U.S. senator and Runaway and Homeless Youth Act sponsor Birch Bayh. The book was released by the publisher Vanguard.

Lloyd, who was an investigative reporter for NBC and previously a Texas television anchorman, decided to write the book following an incident in 1973 when his son, who was 18, and his friend, who was 15, had come home and told Lloyd that they had been lured to the home of a photographer to pose nude for pornography. Lloyd soon learned that the problem was widespread and national, inevitably leading to the publication.

Lloyd claimed that he had found over 264 different magazines being sold in adult book stores around the country which contained material of children engaging in sex acts with both other children and with adults. Lloyd estimated it was likely that over 300,000 boys across the United States under the age of 17 had made a full- or part-time living selling themselves as both prostitutes and for pornography. The book primarily focuses on child pornography organizations circulating and operating around New York, Texas, and Illinois and had also stated that magazines were selling between $5 and $10 each, films for $25.

Lloyd's research pinpoints that parental neglect and child abuse make their children more vulnerable to the phenomenon. The book states: "They look for the love they never found at home and seldom find on the street."

== Criticism ==
The book has been criticized by some who felt that it was overestimating the prevalence of youth prostitution in the United States, as well as spreading speculative and unfounded figures about the matter. Some critics also stated that they felt Lloyd lacked the credentials to write about the topic of youth prostitution.

In an investigative report, the Illinois Legislative Investigating Commission described the book as an "unsupported document" and stated that much of the information contained in it "made its way to the media without interference, creating the probable illusion of young boys prostituting themselves on every street corner of the country". A 1980 academic review of the book stated that it "lacks the characteristics of a quality work." Another 1978 review stated that "it is the sensationalized nature of this book, not its accuracy, which produces fright".
