= Cameron Sexton =

American politician (born 1970)

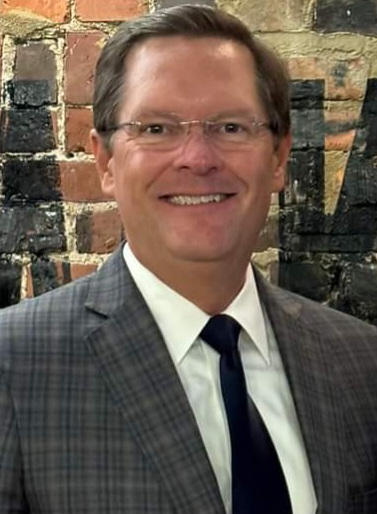
- Sexton in 2024

83rd Speaker of the Tennessee House of Representatives
- Incumbent
- Assumed office August 23, 2019
- Preceded by: Bill Dunn (acting)

Member of the Tennessee House of Representatives from the 25th district
- Incumbent
- Assumed office January 11, 2011
- Preceded by: Eric Swafford

Personal details
- Born: Cameron Allen Sexton; November 11, 1970 (age 56) Tennessee, U.S.
- Party: Republican
- Spouse: Lacey McRae
- Children: 3
- Education: University of Tennessee (BA)
- Website: Campaign website

Cameron Allen Sexton (born November 11, 1970) is an American politician from Tennessee. A Republican, he has been a member of the Tennessee House of Representatives for the 25th district since 2011, and has been the Speaker of the state House since 2019. Before becoming Speaker, Sexton was Majority Caucus Chairman.

== Early life and education ==
Cameron Allen Sexton was born on November 11, 1970, in Tennessee. His father, Dwight Sexton, was a high school chemistry and biology teacher, and his mother, Jane Sexton, was a teacher at Blue Grass Elementary School in Knoxville. Sexton attended public schools in Knox County before graduating from Oak Ridge High School in 1989. He then attended the University of Tennessee, graduating in 1994.

== Early political career ==
After graduating from college, Sexton worked on the 1994 State Senate campaign of Randy McNally. He had jobs in banking and marketing until 2008. In 2008, he unsuccessfully ran for mayor of Crossville, Tennessee, losing by 60 votes. Sexton was also a community liaison for U.S. Representative Van Hilleary.

== State House ==
=== Elections and rise to power ===
Sexton was first elected to the Tennessee House of Representatives in 2010. He was elected as House Majority Whip for the 108th General Assembly, and served as the Majority Caucus Chairman for the 111th General Assembly.

Sexton became Speaker of the House in August 2019, replacing Speaker Glen Casada, who was ousted amid a scandal. The previous month, Sexton was nominated by House Republicans as speaker after multiple rounds of voting, defeating Ryan Williams, Jay Reedy, Curtis Johnson, Mike Carter, and Matthew Hill in the internal party election.

He was reelected in 2021 and 2023, with the unanimous support of state House Republicans.

=== Tenure ===
==== Healthcare ====
Sexton was House Health Committee Chairman during the 109th and 110th General Assemblies. In 2016, former Speaker Beth Harwell appointed him to serve as chairman of a healthcare taskforce. As Health Committee Chairman and later as Speaker, Sexton has opposed accepting federal Medicaid expansion funds to provide health insurance to uninsured Tennesseans. Sexton instead supported seeking a waiver from the U.S. Department of Health and Human Services to allow the state to get Medicaid funding in the form of a block grant, which would give state lawmakers more power to determine eligibility. The state legislature passed, and Governor Bill Lee signed, legislation to authorize the program in January 2021, days before the end of the Trump administration and the beginning of the Biden administration.

In 2022, Sexton introduced legislation to regulate pharmacy benefit managers; he described the legislation as necessary to protect independent pharmacies.

In 2022, Sexton called for a new facility to replace Moccasin Bend Mental Health Institute, a state psychiatric hospital, as part of a larger effort to overhaul Tennessee's mental healthcare system.

==== Crime, policing, and marijuana ====
In 2020, Sexton and other Republicans in the state legislature introduced legislation to substantially increase criminal penalties for unauthorized camping on state-owned land and for writing graffiti on state property (increasing both offenses from misdemeanor to felonies). The bill's sponsors introduced the measure in response to the George Floyd protests.

In 2022, Sexton, along with Lieutenant Governor Randy McNally, cosponsored truth in sentencing legislation, which was enacted with the support of Memphis Mayor Jim Strickland. The legislation requires offenders to serve the full prison sentence (i.e., no parole) for certain crimes (such as attempted murder and burglary).

In 2020, Sexton opposed proposals to amend Tennessee law to legalize medical marijuana. In 2023, Sexton said he was open to allowing "medical marijuana in the right forms" but continued to oppose legalizing the recreational use of marijuana, which he deemed a "terrible idea."

==== Forrest Bust ====
As Speaker, Sexton is a member of the State Building Commission, which governs the Tennessee State Capitol grounds. In 2021, Sexton voted against the removal of the Nathan Bedford Forrest Bust from the Tennessee State Capitol to the Tennessee State Museum. The bust, installed at the state Capitol in 1978, had faced calls for its removal, because Forrest was a Confederate general who founded the Ku Klux Klan after the Civil War. However, a majority of the Building Commission voted to remove the Forrest bust, as well as those of Admiral David Glasgow Farragut and Admiral Albert Gleaves.

==== COVID-19 ====
During the COVID-19 pandemic in Tennessee, Sexton was a key architect of a special session of the legislature to pass bills banning municipalities within Tennessee from establishing face mask or COVID-19 vaccine requirements; the legislation specifically targeted Metro Nashville government's authority. Sexton also opposed the federal OSHA vaccine-or-test mandate for companies with 100 or more employees.

==== Refugee resettlement ====
In 2019, President Donald Trump issued an executive order allowing state governors to block refugee resettlement in their states under the U.S. Refugee Admissions Program. Sexton, along with Lieutenant Governor McNally supported halting refugee resettlement in Tennessee, a position at odds with Governor Bill Lee. In 2021, Sexton and McNally created a Joint Study Committee on Refugee Issues that consisted of 10 Republican state senators and state representatives.

==== Education ====
In 2019, Sexton voted against legislation that would have expanded private school vouchers. In 2025, Sexton supported the Education Freedom Scholarship Act, which created a statewide voucher program. He voted for an expansion of the program in 2026. In 2023, Sexton claimed that he did not change his position on the voucher issue; rather, he said the funding source of the then-proposed program was different than in 2019.

In a special legislative session in 2021, Sexton introduced legislation to make school board elections statewide partisan, rather than nonpartisan. The initial legislation would have required all school board elections statewide to be partisan; after the legislation encountered objections, it was amended to allow local parties to call for partisan school board elections. The legislation was part of an emerging Republican tactic with conservative Republicans focusing on divisive education issues, including age-appropriate book bans and transgender students' rights. The legislation was opposed by the Tennessee School Board Association and many school districts throughout the state. As a result of the passage of the legislation, beginning in 2022, more than half of Tennessee's counties selected candidates to run in school board elections in partisan primaries.

In 2023, Sexton said Tennessee should reject all federal education funds appropriated to Tennessee, and discussed the proposal with Governor Lee and other key Republican legislators. Federal funding makes up about one-fifth of Tennessee's K–12 education funding, (almost $1.8 billion out of $8.3 billion). Rejection of federal funds would primarily impact schools in low-income areas, English language learners, and special education, because it would eliminate Title I (low-income schools), National School Lunch Program, IDEA (students with disabilities), and Carl Perkins vocational/technical education funding. Under the proposal, the state would fund these programs. No state has ever rejected its share of the federal education budget, although the idea gained currency among Republicans in the 2020s. The proposal alarmed Democrats, school districts, the Tennessee Education Association, and the Tennessee Disability Coalition. Sexton said he wanted to reject federal education funding so Tennessee could avoid complying with federal mandates attached to the funding. A U.S. Department of Education spokesperson described the proposal as "political posturing" that would impede education, particularly for the neediest students.

In January 2022, Sexton interjected as Representative John Ray Clemmons tried to honor International Holocaust Remembrance Day inside the House chamber. Clemmons began his honoring of the day by referring to the Auschwitz concentration camp, which the Red Army liberated from the Nazis, to the McMinn County School Board's ban on the Pulitzer Prize-winning Holocaust graphic novel Maus. A few minutes into Clemmons' speech, while he was denouncing anti-Semitism and neo-Nazism, Sexton abruptly interrupted him mid-sentence and reminded Clemmons his honoring of International Holocaust Remembrance Day did not fall within meeting guidelines. Sexton said his objection was that Clemmons' honoring was being made during the "welcoming and honoring" portion of the calendar.

==== Environment and energy ====
In 2017, Sexton sponsored a bill to place a 15-month moratorium on industrial wind energy projects in Tennessee. The passage of the moratorium halted a $100 million wind energy project in Sexton's district. In 2018, Sexton sponsored a bill to regulate wind energy facilities, requiring many wind projects to obtain a certificate of public convenience and approval of two-thirds of the local governmental body.

==== Abortion ====
Tennessee's abortion ban, one of the strictest in the U.S., passed as a trigger law in 2019 and took effect in August 2022, after the U.S. Supreme Court overturned Roe v. Wade. It bans abortion without exceptions in the state, and makes performing the procedure a felony crime. In January 2023, Sexton supported an amendment to the Tennessee law to permit abortion to save the life of the pregnant woman, an issue that divided Tennessee Republicans. (Note: The Tennessee anti-abortion law that went into effect in 2022 had no explicit exemptions, but it did provide that a physician, if prosecuted for performing an abortion, could raise, as an "affirmative defense" that the abortion was medically necessary. The burden to prove an affirmative defense, however, is on the defendant (rather than the burden being on prosecutors), so doctors feared criminal prosecution for terminating pregnancies, even if medically necessary. The 2023 amendment narrowly loosened the ban by removing the "affirmative defense" provision and creating an exemption allowing abortions in cases of ectopic pregnancies, "medically futile pregnancies" and "lethal fetal anomalies." The bill was supported by the Tennessee Medical Association and opposed by the anti-abortion group Tennessee Right to Life.) Sexton also said he supported exceptions to allow abortion in cases of rape or incest.

==== Judiciary ====
In March 2021, Sexton, along with almost all Tennessee House Republicans, attempted to remove a longtime state judge, Davidson County Chancery Court judge Ellen Hobbs Lyle, who ruled in June 2020 that Tennessee's limits on mail-in voting constituted "an unreasonable burden on the fundamental right to vote guaranteed by the Tennessee Constitution" in light of the COVID-19 pandemic. (Lyle's ruling was eventually overturned by the Tennessee Supreme Court). Republicans' attempt to remove Lyle from the bench sparked concerns about undermining the independence of the judiciary, and the attempt was opposed by Common Cause and the Tennessee Bar Association.

==== Appointments ====
In 2021, Sexton nominated Laurie Cardoza-Moore to the Textbook and Instructional Materials Quality Commission, which oversees curricular materials for Tennessee schools. Cardoza-Moore had attracted notoriety for her anti-Islam activism, including her unsuccessful battle in 2010 to block a mosque from being built in Murfreesboro, as well as a textbook review on Cardoza-Moore's website that questioned whether al-Qaeda was responsible for the September 11 terrorist attack. Cardoza-Moore's nomination was approved by a 66–26 vote in the state House.

In 2022, Sexton appointed Chip Saltsman, a prominent Tennessee Republican Party operative and political consultant, to the Tennessee Fish and Wildlife Commission, which oversees the Tennessee Wildlife Resources Agency; Sexton is a major client of Saltsman.

==== Redistricting ====
In 2022, during the redistricting cycle, Sexton and Tennessee House Republicans maneuvered to split Nashville and Davidson County, a fast-growing region, into multiple congressional districts, making it easier for Republicans to flip a district previously won by Democrats. The split broke up the Nashville-based 5th district held by longtime Democratic congressman Jim Cooper, resulting in his decision not to run for reelection. Sexton denied accusations of gerrymandering, stating that he believed the new maps would give Nashville more representation in Washington. The redrawn 5th district was won by Republican Andy Ogles. In May 2026, Sexton led a mid-decade redistricting to eliminate Tennessee's lone Democrat-held congressional seat in Memphis. This was done in response to the U.S. Supreme Court case Louisiana v. Callais, which held that Louisiana's congressional maps were an unconstitutional racial gerrymander. Sexton removed all Democrats from House committees after they protested the new map and accused them of disruption.

==== 2023 expulsions ====
In April 2023, Republican representatives filed motions to expel Gloria Johnson, Justin Jones, and Justin J. Pearson from the House. The members had violated the chamber's decorum rules by leading gun control protests on the House floor during a legislative session. They were not recognized to speak and utilized a megaphone. Jones and Pearson were removed from the House (by a 72–25 result for Jones' vote and a 69–26 result for Pearson's vote); the resolution to expel Johnson failed by one vote to obtain the necessary two-thirds majority.

Sexton led the effort to expel the three members, and had earlier revoked their identification-card access to the Capitol and stripped them of committee assignments. He claimed the legislators intended to incite violence but later acknowledged that he had no evidence for this assertion. In a radio interview after the protests, Sexton compared the demonstration to an insurrection and compared it to the January 6 attack on the U.S. Capitol.

Democrats, including President Joe Biden, condemned the expulsions as authoritarian and undemocratic. Johnson, Jones, Pearson, the Tennessee Black Caucus, and other Democrats alleged that the two members were expelled because of racism. Sexton and other House Republicans rejected the accusation. Jones and Pearson returned to office after the Nashville Metro Council and Shelby County Commission both unanimously voted to reinstate them.

== Personal life ==
Sexton has one child with his wife, Lacey McRae Sexton, a pharmacist, and two children from a previous marriage.

=== Residency and per diem claims ===
In 2023, Sexton's collection of per diem payments drew scrutiny.

Sexton owns a condo in Crossville in his district, as well as a home in West Nashville, which he purchased through an anonymous trust in September 2021. His youngest child attends school near Nashville, and Sexton lives in Nashville during the legislative session, though he collects per diem payments as if he commutes from Crossville. Legislators who live at least 50 miles (80 km) outside Nashville are entitled to a tax-free daily payment of $313 (which is meant to cover meals, lodging and incidental expenses incurred in travel); legislators who live within 50 miles (80 km) of Nashville are entitled to only $79. Sexton claimed the full $313 per diem, collecting approximately $78,000 in per diem expenses in 2021 and 2022.

== Electoral history ==
Tennessee House of Representatives District 25 Republican primary results, 2010
Party	Candidate	Votes	%
Republican	Cameron Sexton	8,798	62.77%
Republican	Eric Swafford	5,219	37.23%
Total votes		14,017	100.00%

Tennessee House of Representatives District 25 General Election, 2010
Party	Candidate	Votes	%
Republican	Cameron Sexton	15,434	67.16%
Democratic	Charles Ray Rains	7,117	30.96%
Independent	Kevin Klingberg	432	1.88%
Total votes		22,983	100.00%
Republican hold			

Tennessee House of Representatives District 25 General Election, 2012
Party	Candidate	Votes	%
Republican	Cameron Sexton (incumbent)	19,488	74.32%
Democratic	Flo Matheson	6,733	25.68%
Total votes		26,221	100.00%
Republican hold			

Tennessee House of Representatives District 25 General Election, 2014
Party	Candidate	Votes	%
Republican	Cameron Sexton (incumbent)	14,593	76.70%
Democratic	Judy Barnett	4,435	23.30%
Total votes		19,028	100.00%
Republican hold			

Tennessee House of Representatives District 25 General Election, 2016
Party	Candidate	Votes	%
Republican	Cameron Sexton (incumbent)	22,335	78.61%
Democratic	Judy Barnett	6,077	21.39%
Total votes		28,412	100.00%
Republican hold			

Tennessee House of Representatives District 25 General Election, 2018
Party	Candidate	Votes	%
Republican	Cameron Sexton (incumbent)	21,077	77.93%
Democratic	Anne Quillen	5,968	22.07%
Total votes		27,045	100.00%
Republican hold			

Tennessee House of Representatives District 25 General Election, 2020
Party	Candidate	Votes	%
Republican	Cameron Sexton (incumbent)	27,778	81.64%
Democratic	Robyn Deck	6,250	18.36%
Total votes		34,028	100.00%
Republican hold			

Tennessee House of Representatives District 25 General Election, 2022
Party	Candidate	Votes	%
Republican	Cameron Sexton (incumbent)	19,657	82.79%
Democratic	Anne Quillen	4,088	17.21%
Total votes		23,745	100.00%
Republican hold			

== Notes ==
Political offices
Preceded by Bill Dunn; Acting	Speaker of the Tennessee House of Representatives; 2019–present	Incumbent
