= Tennessee House of Representatives 68th district =

State legislative district in Tennessee

Tennessee's 68th State House of Representatives district
- Map of Tennessee House districts with the 68th District shaded in red
Representative
Aron Maberry; R–Clarksville
- Demographics: 71.9% White; 11.7% Black; 6.8% Hispanic; 3.2% Asian; 0.1% Native American; 0.3% Other; 5.9% Multiracial
- Population (2024): 81,662

Tennessee House of Representatives District 68 is one of the 99 legislative districts in the Tennessee House of Representatives. The district covers parts of eastern Montgomery County, Tennessee (including the eastern side of Clarksville, Tennessee). It has been represented by Aron Maberry since 2025.

== Demographics ==
According to the 2024 American Community Survey, District 3 had a population of approximately 81,662.

- 71.9% of the district is White
- 11.7% of the district is African-American
- 6.8% of the district is Hispanic
- 3.2% of the district is Asian
- 5.9% of the district is two or more races

Detailed demographic information on the district is also available through Statistical Atlas.

== History ==
The 88th Tennessee General Assembly is the first in which all districts were numbered. At this time, the 68th district was made up of all or parts of Houston, Humphreys, and Montgomery counties. At the time of the 89th GA, it also included Henry and Stewart counties while excluding Humphreys. At the time of the 90th, it was reverted back to the original counties. At the 93rd, GA, it was Houston and Montgomery counties. From the 94th to 97th, it was parts of Cheatham and Montgomery counties. From the 98th, it has been a part of Montgomery County.

== Representative ==
Representative	Party	Years of Service	General Assembly	Hometown
Aron Maberry	Republican	2025-present	114th	Clarksville
Curtis Johnson	Republican	2005-2024	104th-113th	Clarksville
Tommy Head	Democratic	1987-2004	95th-103rd	Adams
Stan D. Darnell	Democratic	1985-1986	94th	Adams
Roscoe Pickering	Democratic	1969-1984	86th-93rd	Adams

== Elections ==
=== 2024 ===
2024 Tennessee House of Representatives District 68 general election
Party	Candidate	Votes	%
Republican	Aron Maberry	23,249	67.98%
Democratic	Garfield Scott	10,950	32.02%
Total votes		34,199	100.00%
Republican hold			

=== 2022 ===
Tennessee House of Representatives District 68 general election, 2022
Party	Candidate	Votes	%
Republican	Curtis Johnson (incumbent)	13,501	71.17%
Independent	Monica Meeks	5,469	28.83%
Total votes		18,970	100.00%
Republican hold			

=== 2020 ===
2020 Tennessee House of Representatives District 68 general election
Party	Candidate	Votes	%
Republican	Curtis Johnson	28,351	100.00%
Total votes		28,351	100.00%
Republican hold			

=== 2018 ===
2018 Tennessee House of Representatives District 68 general election
Party	Candidate	Votes	%
Republican	Curtis Johnson	17,798	66.90%
Democratic	Dennis Potvin	8,804	33.10%
Total votes		26,602	100.00%
Republican hold			

=== 2016 ===
2016 Tennessee House of Representatives District 68 general election
Party	Candidate	Votes	%
Republican	Curtis Johnson	22,757	100.00%
Total votes		22,757	100.00%
Republican hold			

=== 2014 ===
2014 Tennessee House of Representatives District 68 general election
Party	Candidate	Votes	%
Republican	Curtis Johnson	12,872	100.00%
Total votes		12,872	100.00%
Republican hold			

=== 2012 ===
2012 Tennessee House of Representatives District 68 general election
Party	Candidate	Votes	%
Republican	Curtis Johnson	18,376	100.00%
Total votes		18,376	100.00%
Republican hold			

=== 2010 ===
2010 Tennessee House of Representatives District 68 general election
Party	Candidate	Votes	%
Republican	Curtis Johnson	10,804	64.71%
Democratic	Brett Ramsey	5,891	35.29%
Total votes		16,695	100.00%
Republican hold			

=== 2008 ===
2008 Tennessee House of Representatives District 68 general election
Party	Candidate	Votes	%
Republican	Curtis Johnson	18,177	100.00%
Total votes		18,177	100.00%
Republican hold			

=== 2006 ===
2006 Tennessee House of Representatives District 68 general election
Party	Candidate	Votes	%
Republican	Curtis Johnson	10,158	55.48%
Democratic	Tim Barnes	8,151	44.52%
Total votes		18,309	100.00%
Republican hold			

=== 2004 ===
2004 Tennessee House of Representatives District 68 general election
Party	Candidate	Votes	%
Republican	Curtis G. Johnson	13,044	55.25%
Democratic	Tommy Head	10,565	44.75%
Total votes		23,609	100.00%
Republican gain from Democratic			

=== 2002 ===
2002 Tennessee House of Representatives District 68 general election
Party	Candidate	Votes	%
Democratic	Tommy Head	8,409	52.81%
Republican	Sam Cross	7,514	47.19%
Total votes		15,923	100.00%
Democratic hold			

=== 2000 ===
2000 Tennessee House of Representatives District 68 general election
Party	Candidate	Votes	%
Democratic	Tommy Head	11,850	58.48%
Republican	Dale B. Redman	8,412	41.52%
Total votes		20,262	100.00%
Democratic hold			

=== 1998 ===
1998 Tennessee House of Representatives District 68 general election
Party	Candidate	Votes	%
Democratic	Tommy Head	7,638	74.26%
Republican	John McCotter Leckrone	2,647	25.74%
Total votes		10,285	100.00%
Democratic hold			

=== 1996 ===
1996 Tennessee House of Representatives District 68 general election
Party	Candidate	Votes	%
Democratic	Tommy Head	9,780	60.77%
Republican	John McCotter Leckrone	6,313	39.23%
Total votes		16,093	100.00%
Democratic hold			

=== 1994 ===
1994 Tennessee House of Representatives District 68 general election
Party	Candidate	Votes	%
Democratic	Tommy Head	6,666	59.04%
Republican	Miriam Chambers	4,625	40.96%
Total votes		11,291	100.00%
Democratic hold			
