= Moccasin Bend =

- Moccasin Bend National Archeological District
- U.S. National Register of Historic Places
- U.S. National Historic Landmark District
- U.S. Historic district
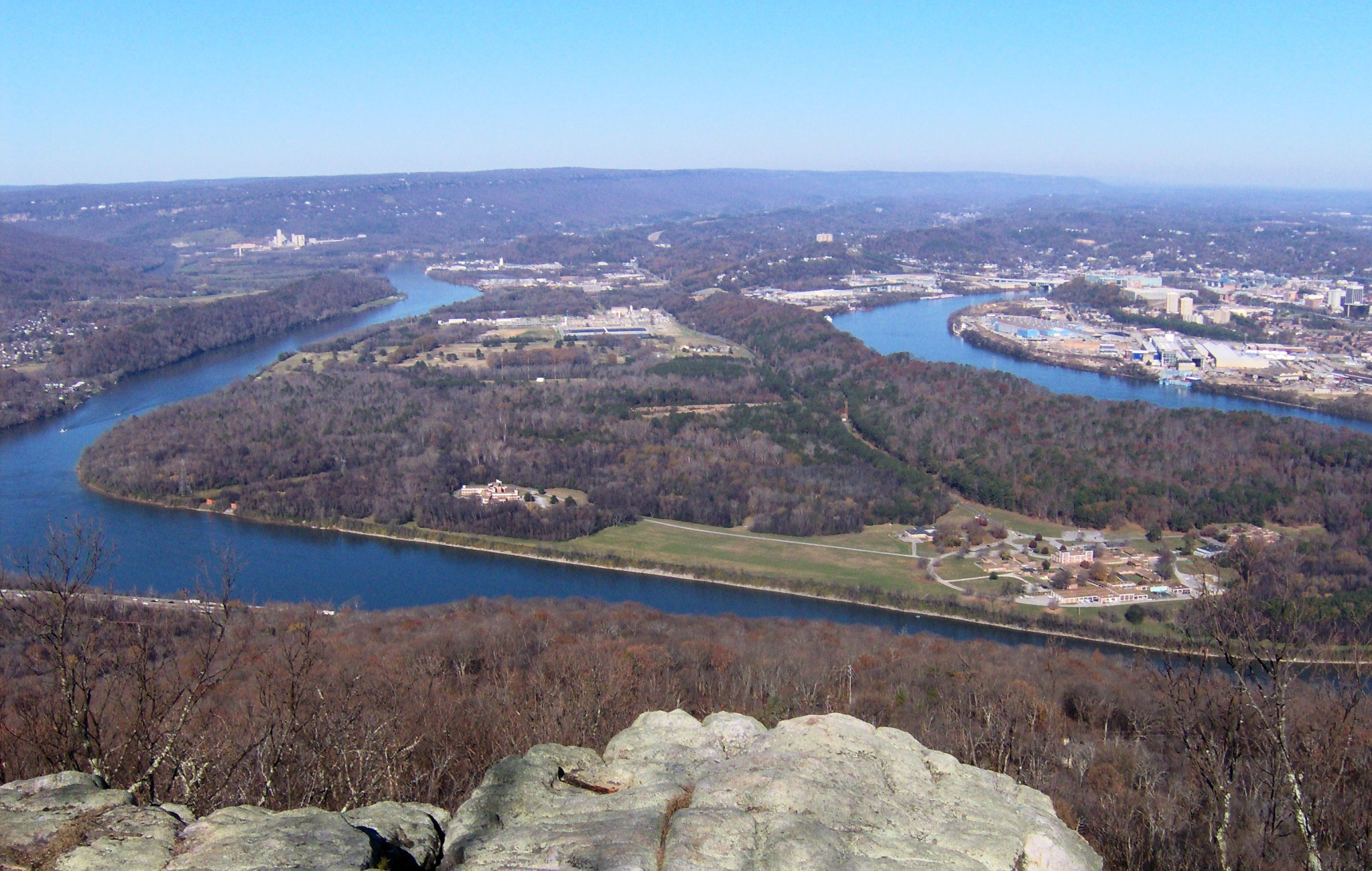
- Moccasin Bend, viewed from Lookout Mountain

- Location within Tennessee Location within the United States
- Nearest city: Chattanooga, Tennessee
- Coordinates: 35°2′9″N 85°20′12″W
- Area: 956 acres (387 ha)
- NRHP reference No.: 86003510

Significant dates
- Added to NRHP: September 8, 1986
- Designated NHLD: September 9, 1996

Moccasin Bend Archeological District is an archeological site in Chattanooga, Tennessee, that is part of the Chickamauga and Chattanooga National Military Park unit. The National Park Service refers to it as one of the "most unique units found in the entire National Park Service." The area contains remnants of 12,000 years of continuous human habitation and serves as an area with unique cultural significance. For many years, there was little recognition of the historical significance of the area, and years of industrial development occurred on and around sites of archeological importance. After decades of campaigning by concerned citizens, private organizations, local officials, the Friends of Moccasin Bend National Park, and finally a state representative, the area was officially recognized as a National Archeological District in 2003. Moccasin Bend is currently undergoing a process of renovation and restoration that will allow the area to fulfill the National Park Service's mission of preserving "natural and cultural resources" for the "enjoyment, education, and inspiration of this and future generations."

The 956-acre (387 ha) area is located directly across the Tennessee River from Lookout Mountain, site of an American Civil War battle. The archeological district is significant due to the prevalence of historic artifacts found within some of the most historically important Native American sites in the United States. Moccasin Bend was a part of the Trail of Tears and also played a vital role in the American Civil War.

== Moccasin Bend National Archeological District ==
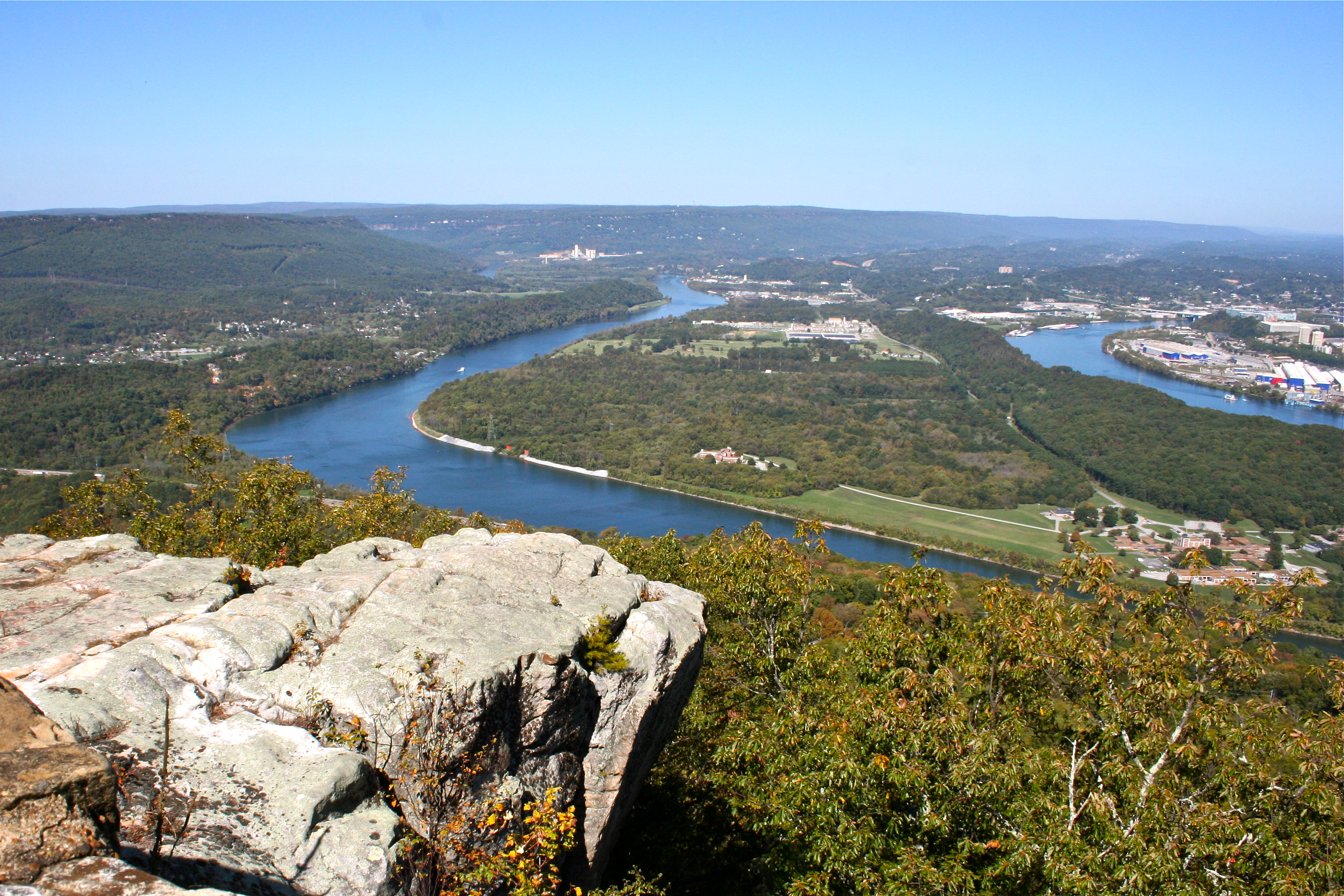
A view of the National Archeological District

In 2003, with the help of U.S. Representative Zach Wamp, the Friends of Moccasin Bend, and community leaders, the Moccasin Bend National Archeological District was created as part of the Chickamauga National Military Park. This designation made Moccasin Bend the first and only National Archeological District in the entire National Park Service. The area of land known as Moccasin Bend is a 1,000-acre peninsula sitting on the edge of the Tennessee River. Most of the land on the peninsula became the property of the federal government, excluding the already existing facilities mentioned previously. This created a rather fragmented park with distinct and diverse parts. The core area of the District resides on the southern tip of the Bend. This area includes Civil War resources and important American Indian sites. Upon its adoption into the National Park Service, various projects began intended to survey the landscape, investigate sites of archeological significance, stabilize at risk areas, and explore potential opportunities to develop the land as a park. The Friends of Moccasin Bend, alongside the National Park Service, sought to implement such amenities as an interpretive center. Plans for this interpretive center are currently in the works.

Just as the creation of the park was relatively slow going, so has been the process of developing the Bend's park aspects. The fragmented nature of the park and its history of industrial and commercial use has made the transition into a thriving area of cultural and historical significance a challenge. In order to move forward with some of the proposed plans for development, there are areas of land that need to be acquired from their current landowners. This has proved to be a difficult task. Despite these challenges, efforts are still being made to continue progress at Moccasin Bend and strive towards the goal of a unique experience through facilitated preservation, protection, and interpretation of the area. These efforts are largely spearheaded by the Friends of Moccasin Bend. While the Friends of Moccasin Bend and the National Park Service work with the city to move forward on the proposed plans, there are currently some limited recreational opportunities and amenities.

=== Current amenities ===
While areas of the park continue to be developed, there are a few key areas that are currently accessible to the public and allow a glimpse into the unique landscape of Moccasin Bend. The National Archeological District includes a 10.5-acre meadow that has been designated the future site of an interpretive center. The area is located on Hamm Road, a crucial gateway that runs through Moccasin Bend. It is surrounded by industrial tracts of land and is not connected to any other NPS-owned areas. This site, unlike most other tracts of land within the National Archeological District, is unlikely to contain archeological resources. This feature made it the desired location for the pending interpretive center, which would include development such as a parking lot and restrooms. This site will serve as a vital access point for public visitors.

The Blue Blazes Trail is a 1.5-mile hiking trail located within the National Archeological District. This trail existed before the Bend's designation as part of a National Park. Prior to the federal governments acquisition of this land, the Blue Blazes Trail, established by members of the Sierra Club, was under city/county management. The trail is low lying and contains numerous wetlands, with numerous muddy patches throughout. Efforts are being made to make walking through the muddy patches possible. Currently there are no interpretive signs along this trail, but there are numerous areas of historical significance nearby, including the site where multiple Paleo-era projectile points were found. There is public access to the trails through the trailhead, adjacent to a gravel lot.

Brown's Ferry Federal Road is a 98-acre tract of land owned by the National Park Service. The area was the former site of Moccasin Bend Speedway and also contains portions of land that were part of the John Brown Reservation. The site is now home to a 1.2-mile roundtrip hike that traverses over a part of the tract that was used during the Trail of Tears. Additionally, this road was used to transport Union supplies during the Civil War in 1863. This trail is marked by interpretive signs explaining some of the historical and cultural significance of the route. This trail is also open to the public and can be accessed through a parking lot located on Moccasin Bend Road.

=== Sites of significance ===
Moccasin Bend, as per its designation as a National Historic Landmark and its place on the National Register of Historic Places contains a plethora of sites with archeological, cultural, and historical significance. The primary significance of this area falls within the context of American Indian history and American Civil War history. The 12,000 years of human inhabitation have left a number of rare artifacts that contribute to this sites importance. The primary archeological site at Moccasin Bend is Hampton Place. This area contains two Late Mississippian towns that were perhaps visited by Spanish explorers, as revealed through the presence of Spanish artifacts. Prior to the Bend's designation as a National Archeological District, Hampton Place was heavily looted and vandalized, leaving little visible evidence of the once prominent archeological complex. Another important site within Moccasin Bend is the Mallards Dozen Site, an area that contains remnants of Middle Woodland civilization. Most of the archeological evidence contributing to this knowledge is not currently visible. However, portions of the site are accessible via the Blue Blazes Trail.

The Vulcan Site includes remains from the Archaic and Woodland periods. This includes a Late Archaic period house that is dated to 1335 B.C., considered to be one of the earliest family houses in the southeastern United States. Parts of the Vulcan Site are included in the Blue Blazes Trail as well as on the Moccasin Bend Golf Course. As with the other sites, the archeological site is not currently visible. The Woodland Mound Complex is located on the southern tip of Moccasin Bend and is within the confines of the Moccasin Bend Mental Health Institute. These mounds are attributed to burial practices of the Late Woodland period. Because of the mounds' proximity to the mental health facility, access is limited.

As indicated by the presence of Brown's Ferry Federal Road, John Brown, who operated Brown's Ferry, the site of a historic Civil War Battle, Moccasin Bend was the site of his homestead. While this contributes to the historical significance of Moccasin Bend, few remnants remain of John Brown's inhabitance on Moccasin Bend. There are a number of other Civil War sites located on the southern tip of Stringers Ridge. These sites were occupied by the Union Army during 1863. The historic roads that mark this period of time are still usable today, and multiple sites can be observed from Stringers Ridge.

== Friends of Moccasin Bend National Park ==
This organization was established in 1994 to serve as an advocacy group for the adoption of Moccasin Bend into the Chickamauga and Chattanooga National Military Park. The organization was instrumental in leading to the creation of the park and continues to be actively involved in the park's management and policies. At the time of its creation, the plans for Moccasin Bend's future were still very much up for debate. After the idea had been shut down for decades, the Friends of Moccasin Bend revitalized the idea of adding Moccasin Bend to the Chickamauga Chattanooga National Military Park. They conducted an economic impact report of making the area part of the National Park Service and concluded that it would have a positive economic impact on the city. The Friends continued to be advocates for establishing the area as part of a National Park. They reached out to state representatives and helped build support from the community.

In 2001, U.S. Representative Zach Wamp proposed HR 980, which called for the creation of Moccasin Bend National Archeological District as part of the Chickamauga National Military Park. The bill was finally passed in 2003. In 2004, the Archeological District was officially established after the state and local government donated 672 acres of public land to the federal government (the boundaries of the park excluded already existing facilities: Moccasin Bend Mental Health Institute, Moccasin Bend Golf Course, the WDEF radio tower, the Hamilton County firing range, and a model airplane facility). The Friends of Moccasin Bend National Park were instrumental in this process.

The organization, established a decade prior to the area's designation as a National Archeological District, remained active until 2017. According to their now decommissioned website, they worked alongside the National Park Service to develop "outstanding visitor experiences at one of America's newest national park areas." In addition, they supported the National Park Service in its endeavors towards "preservation, protection, and interpretation of the cultural, historical, and natural resources of the Moccasin Bend National Archeological District..."The Friends of Moccasin Bend, a non-profit organization, served as the grass roots organizers, fund raisers, and overall advocates for the park. They ensured that the park was not lost in the shuffle of federal government bureaucracy, and continues to move forward as the valuable asset that it is to Chattanooga.

After the Moccasin Bend National Archeological District officially became part of the NPS General Management Plan, Friends of Moccasin Bend merged with the already existing Friends of the Park group that had formed in 1986 for the Chickamauga and Chattanooga National Military Park, and in 2018 became National Park Partners: Chickamauga - Chattanooga - Moccasin Bend. National Park Partners worked with the National Park Service to launch a capital campaign Forever Moccasin Bend for the new visitor and interpretive center on Hamm Road. This campaign was successful, planning for the construction of the center is currently underway.

In 2023, the State of Tennessee announced plans to use Cares Act funding to build a new mental health hospital on Moccasin Bend to replace the aging Moccasin Bend State Mental Health Institute. The announcement stirred public outcry against new construction within the National Historic Landmark Boundary, and prompted National Park Partners to launch a second phase of their Forever Moccasin Bend campaign. This phase has been dubbed "Save the Bend, Again" in reference to slogans used by Friends of Moccasin Bend and other groups during previous efforts to preserve Moccasin Bend. Several former members of Friends of Moccasin Bend have also stepped forward to speak out against the new construction.

== History ==
=== Paleo-Indian to Mississippian Periods (10500 BC – AD 1630) ===
Native Americans used this land as a place for a home as long as 12,000 years ago. During the Paleo-Indian Period (10500–8000 BC), Moccasin Bend served as a home for Paleo-Indians. These people evidently had a highly mobile hunting and gathering way of life. The artifact markers for this period include a variety of fluted, semi-fluted, and un-fluted lanceolate projectile points. The Paleo-Indian period corresponds to the end of the Pleistocene Era.

During the Woodland Period (700 BC – 1000 AD,) there were major changes evolving with the needs of the Indian people. The use of bow and arrows became the primary way of hunting and pottery became widely popular throughout the Indian tribes. From the Woodland Period, artifacts have been found on Moccasin Bend.

During the Mississippian Period (AD 1000–1630), the American Indians resided on Moccasin Bend in large villages enclosed by corn fields and other agricultural necessities. The Mississippian Period was also the time of interaction with the Spanish to the area, starting with Hernando de Soto's march through the area in 1540. Moccasin Bend was very important area of land at this time.

=== American Indian and European contact to American colonial settlement and forced removal periods (AD 1513–1860) ===
Early interactions between American-Indians of the Mississippian Period and European explorers such as Hernando de Soto were especially destructive for American-Indian populations. The establishment of French and British trading networks in these early settlements introduced firearms to Indians, which altered their economy. Indian communities began to emphasize hunting for hides as an economic resource, as hides were of great value to French and British settlers. During this time, Cherokee Indians only lightly used Moccasin Bend.

Another historical site across Moccasin Bend, possibly constructed in 1805, was the USA Federal Road, used to connect Georgia with Tennessee to the north by transiting through the Cherokee Nation. In 1838, the Cherokee Indians were forced out of their national area by the U.S. Government. Moccasin Bend was not part of the Cherokee Nation in 1838 but was crossed by two departing parties on the Trail of Tears.

=== Civil War (1861–1865) ===
Moccasin Bend also played a major role in the Civil War. The Union forces took control of west and middle Tennessee, leaving one important place they had not yet conquered. They took that in the Chattanooga campaign. "According to Civil War historian, James McPherson, Chattanooga had great strategic value, for the only railroads linking the eastern and western parts of the Confederacy converged there in a gap carved through the Cumberland Mountains by the Tennessee River. Union forces could divide the eastern portion by penetrating into Georgia via Chattanooga."

=== Post–Civil War 19th century and early 20th century (1866–1925) ===
After the Civil War, some farmers who had been dislocated returned to the land and re-established agricultural practices. Most of the land continued to be used for agriculture, but it was divided and sold to various farmers and individuals. In 1898, some individuals promoted a plan of creating a canal that ran across the Bend. The plan was eventually dropped because of its extremely high cost. In the early part of the 20th century, Moccasin Bend was investigated by numerous archeologists. They discovered a number of burial mounds and other artifacts. At this point in time, citizens in Chattanooga were only beginning to understand the impressive cultural and historical significance of the land.

=== Early preservation efforts in 20th century (1926–1960) ===
Prior to World War II, citizens of Lookout Mountain petitioned to have the city of Chattanooga purchase Moccasin Bend to be "as a park and pleasure resort for all the people of Chattanooga and Hamilton County." This was the first of many attempts to create a park on the land. However, the Great Depression and World War II soon directed attention elsewhere and the push for the creation of the park went on a temporary hiatus.

In 1944, the Chattanooga Chamber of Commerce established the Moccasin Bend Memorial Park Association for the purpose of developing a park that would be dedicated to military service men and women. Despite widespread support for the creation of this park, even going so far as to gain the approval of Governor Browning in 1951, the money necessary for the acquisition of land on Moccasin Bend was cut from the budget by Browning's successor, which effectively put a halt on the memorial park project. As the memorial park project died out, government officials and business leaders advocated for a plethora of other ideas. Some wanted the land to be used for a mental health facility. Others wanted the land to be used for industrial development. The Chattanooga Times supported the creation of both a mental health facility and a park. In 1957, as pressures to industrialize mounted, the Moccasin Bend Association was formed to promote preservation of the land. However, it appeared that most people at the time supported a broader, multiple use plan for the land. With this information in mind, Charles Dunn, superintendent of the Chickamauga Chattanooga National Military Park, presented his opinion that the federal government should seek to acquire the land and make it a National Park. However, the National Park Service believed that recent developments on the land detracted from the scenic and recreational value of the land that had originally led the NPS to be interested in the Bend. In 1960 a large chunk of the land was sold to Chattanooga and Hamilton County. This transaction meant that almost all of the land on the Bend was under public control. This was, according to a Chattanooga Times article, the end to the 25-year controversy over Moccasin Bend.

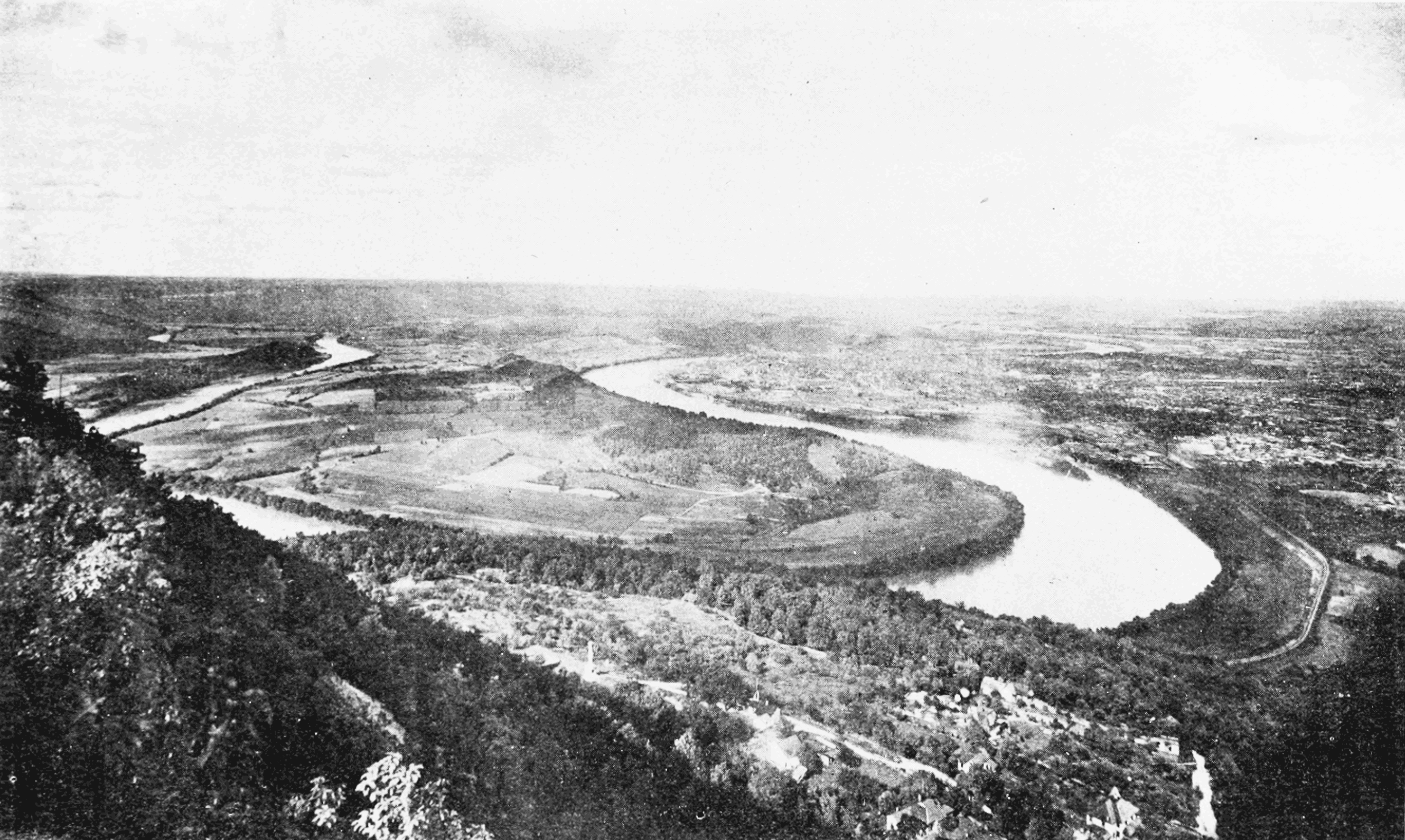
Historic image of Moccasin Bend from Lookout Mountain

=== Later preservation efforts in 20th century (1961–1993) ===
In 1961, the Moccasin Bend Mental Health Institute was officially opened for service after approximately three years of construction. This development was a step backward for those who wished to preserve the land for its recreation uses. To combat this, in that same year the Moccasin Bend Association revived efforts to involve the National Park Service in the management of the land. As advocates for the creation of a park who opposed industrialization and development on the land sought out the NPS's assistance with increased urgency, the park superintendent at the time, John Cook, dismissed their claims, arguing that the Bend "has lost its historical significance and part of its natural beauty," which decreased its value as an asset for the National Park. His belief was that the land on Moccasin Bend was the responsibility of local individuals and governments.

As the chances of the National Park Services becoming involved in the area diminished, numerous development projects came to light. One particularly destructive project was the large scale dredging that took place at the future site of Chattanooga State Technical College. During this project, archaeologists found a number of important artifacts that indicated the historic presence of Indian civilization on the land for thousands of years. Prominent supporters of the land attempted to use this as an opportunity to legitimize the land's national importance, but to no avail. The NPS remained uninterested in the matter. In 1965 Moccasin Bend Golf Course was created. At the same time, the local government prepared to purchase some of the last remaining land that was available for industrial development. Various ideas were proposed as to how the land should be used, but development was frequently obstructed by continual discoveries of American Indian remains. These frequent discoveries led some people, particularly archeologists, to believe that Moccasin Bend needed to be placed on the National Register of Historic Places.

As conflicting views came to a head, the city and county governments, in partnership with the Lyndhurst Foundation, created the Moccasin Bend Task Force in 1982. The Moccasin Bend Task Force teamed up with the Chattanooga Regional Anthropological Association. These two groups both represented unique views, centered on a conflict between historical conservation versus preservation. They each recognized the cultural importance of the land and overall opposed industrial developments. The Anthropological Association was extremely active in excavation and archeology. The Task Force was concerned with the extent of archeological work being done and eventually asked for all artifacts found at Moccasin Bend to be returned. Meanwhile, Moccasin Bend had been nominated to become designated as a National Historic Landmark. This was approved in 1986. Three years later, the blue blazes trail was established. Once the land was officially designated as having historic and cultural significance, involved parties began the task of outlining how the land should be monitored, protected, and preserved. In 1994, the Friends of Moccasin Bend National Park organization was established, marking a new era in efforts to protect and restore Moccasin Bend.

== Non-National Park landscape features ==
After a tumultuous past regarding the best use of the land on Moccasin Bend, there are currently a wide range of activities and institutions that exist within the confines of Moccasin Bend. The area that is a part of the National Park Unit is technically part of the Northshore area of Chattanooga, but is disconnected from the heart of downtown. Much of the industries that entered the area during the second half of the twentieth century continue to operate. Manufacturers Road and Hamm Road, the central avenues leading to Moccasin Bend, are full of industry. A common complaint about Moccasin Bend as a recreation area is that its access is limited by the uninviting, polluted roadways that must be traveled to reach the park.

Aside from the plethora of industries in the area, the land on Moccasin Bend is used for a number of other amenities. The Moccasin Bend Mental Health Institute was established in 1961 and continues to be in operation, although some park advocates hope for the mental health facility to be phased out. Additionally, the Moccasin Bend Golf Course, also established in the 1960s, remains in use to this day, and contributes to the fragmented nature of the park.

=== Moccasin Bend Mental Health Institute ===
Moccasin Bend is the site of the Moccasin Bend Mental Health Institute, a psychiatric hospital established in 1961 by the Tennessee State Legislature. Local architect Mario Bianculli, considered "Chattanooga's First Modernist," designed the majority of the institution's five buildings. According to preliminary research done by the National Park Service, three of the five buildings at the facility appear to be unused. Some of the landscape around the perimeter of the facility is part of a federal government easement that runs the entire length of the riverbank upon which Moccasin Mental Health Institute is located. There are a number of American Indian mounds on part of the hospital property. However, because of hospital security measures, there is little to no public access to these sites.

=== Moccasin Bend Golf Course ===
The golf course is currently owned by Hamilton County and the City of Chattanooga and is managed by HMS Golf. It is an approximately 160 acre area of land, south of the Moccasin Bend Wastewater Treatment Facility and north of the Blue Blazes Trail. The National Park Service maintains a shoreline easement along the western boundary of the golf course. The creation of the course altered some of the landscape, and erosion is evident in a few areas. Moccasin Bend Golf Course contains an area that is part of the Vulcan site, an important archaeological area. This fact must be considered in future management of the property.

The Moccasin Bend Wastewater Treatment Facility is in very close proximity to the golf course and is a 184-acre tract of land. This was developed in 1961 and remains in constant use today.

=== Other features ===
Due to the extensive delay in creating a National Park and protecting the land, there are an assortment of buildings, industries, and developed features within Moccasin Bend. The county firing range for law enforcement training is currently located on Moccasin Bend Road. The firing range includes a number of buildings and other structures. The area where the firing range is located sits within the 750-acre area of land that was donate by the city to the National Park Service. The Friends of Moccasin Bend National Park and other community advocates are currently in the process of convincing the city to relocate the firing range, allowing the National Park to establish a more continuous tract of land. There is currently one private residence along Moccasin Bend Road, and it is surrounded by the NPS-owned property. Also surrounded by NPS-owned property sit the WDEF radio towers. These radio towers are currently in operation.

== See also ==
- List of National Historic Landmarks in Tennessee
- National Register of Historic Places listings in Hamilton County, Tennessee
