= Tennessee House of Representatives 62nd district =

State legislative district in Tennessee

Tennessee's 62nd State House of Representatives district
- Map of Tennessee House districts with the 62nd District shaded in red
Representative
Pat Marsh; R–Shelbyville
since 2023
- Demographics: 76.1% White; 6.6% Black; 12.2% Hispanic; 0.7% Asian; 4.3% Multiracial
- Population (2024): 76,617

The Tennessee House of Representatives 62nd district is one of the 99 legislative districts in the lower house of the Tennessee General Assembly. The district is located in Middle Tennessee and covers Bedford, Moore, and part of Lincoln counties. The district includes the cities of Shelbyville and Fayetteville. Moore County is a consolidated city-county government contiguous with Lynchburg. The district also includes the smaller settlements of Wartrace, Bell Buckle, Normandy and Petersburg, while the rest is largely rural and unincorporated. Pat Marsh has represented the district since 2023.

== Demographics ==
The Tennessee Comptroller estimates the population as of 2024 at 76,617.

- 76.1% of the district is White
- 12.2% of the district is Hispanic
- 6.6% of the district is Black
- 0.7% of the district is Asian
- 4.3% of the district is Two or more races

Detailed demographic information is also available through Census Reporter.

== History ==
The 88th Tennessee General Assembly was the first in which all districts were numbered. At that time, the 62nd district was part of Bedford, Davidson, and Rutherford counties.From the 89th-92nd GAs, it was part of Bedford, Davidson, Rutherford, and Williamson counties. At the time of the 93rd GA, it was made up of Bedford, Davidson and Rutherford counties once more. From the 94th-97th GAs, it was part of Bedford, Lincoln, and Marshall counties. From the 98th-102nd GA it was part of Bedford and Lincoln counties. From the 103rd-107th GAs, it was composed of Bedford and parts of Lincoln and Rutherford counties.From the 108th-112th GAs, it was composed of Bedford and parts of Lincoln counties. Since the 113th General Assembly, it has been composed of Bedford, Moore, and part of Lincoln counties.

== List of Representatives ==
Representative	Party	Years of Service	General Assembly	Hometown
Pat Marsh	Republican	2009-present	106th-114th	Shelbyville
Curt Cobb	Democratic	2003-2008	103rd-105th	Shelbyville
Clarence Phillips	Democratic	1973-2002	88th-102nd	Shelbyville
