= Battle of Wauhatchie =

1863 battle of the American Civil War

- Part of the American Civil War
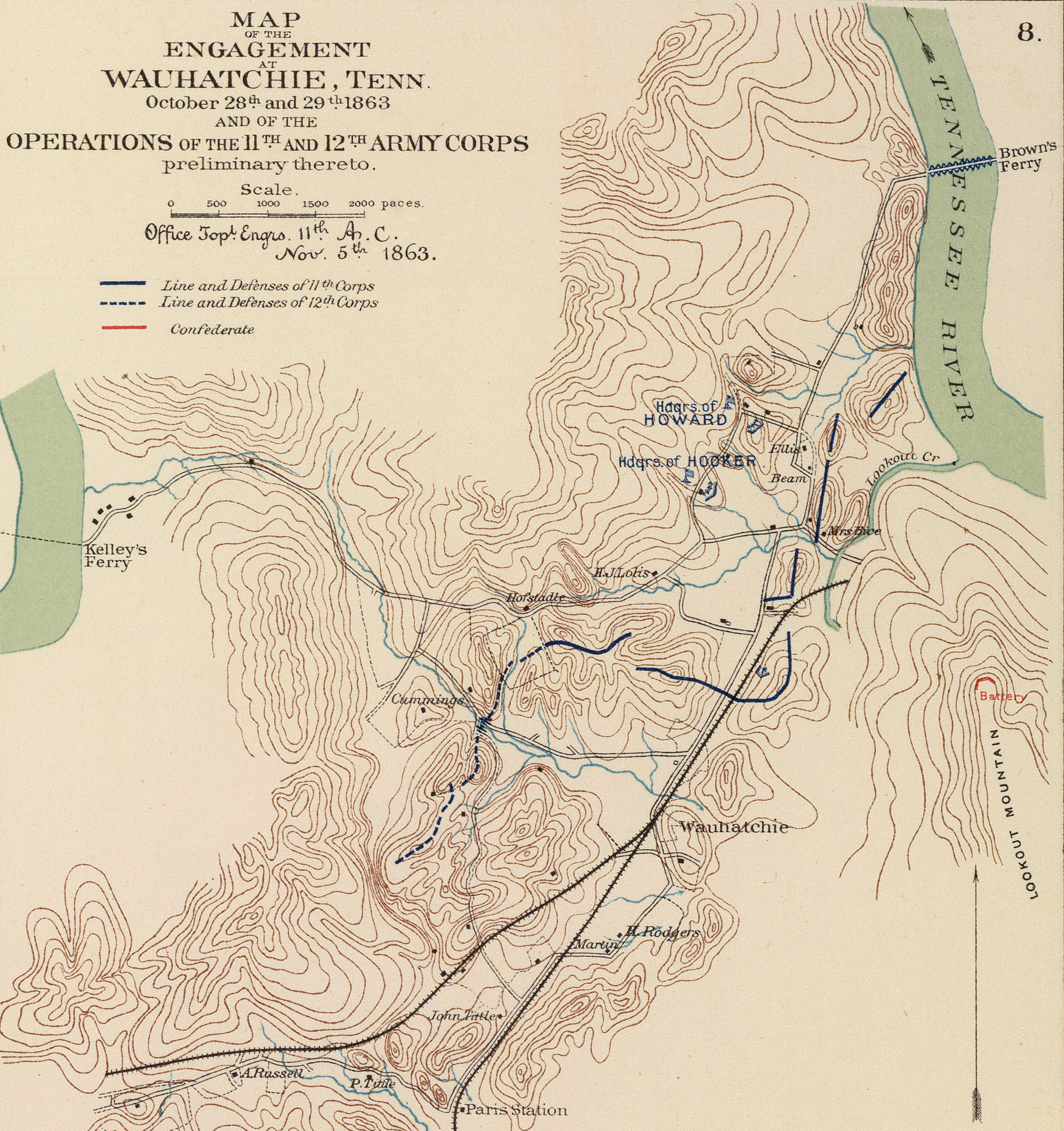
- Map of the engagement at Wauhatchie, Tenn. by Julius Bien & Co.
Date	October 28, 1863 – October 29, 1863
Location	Hamilton County, Tennessee 35°00′35″N 85°22′28″W
Result	Union victory

Belligerents
United States (Union)	(Confederate States of America) CSA (Confederacy)

Commanders and leaders
Joseph Hooker; John W. Geary; Carl Schurz; Adolph von Steinwehr	Micah Jenkins

Units involved
XI Corps; XII Corps	Jenkins's Brigade; Longstreet's Corps

Casualties and losses
420: 78 killed; 327 wounded; 15 missing	408: 34 killed; 305 wounded; 69 missing

The Battle of Wauhatchie was fought October 28–29, 1863, in Hamilton and Marion counties, Tennessee, and Dade County, Georgia, in the American Civil War. A Union force had seized Brown's Ferry on the Tennessee River, opening a supply line to the Union army in Chattanooga. Confederate forces attempted to dislodge the Union force defending the ferry and again close this supply line but were defeated. Wauhatchie was one of the few night battles of the Civil War.

== Background ==
After their disastrous defeat at the Battle of Chickamauga, Union forces under Maj. Gen. William Rosecrans retreated to Chattanooga, Tennessee. Confederate Gen. Braxton Bragg's Army of Tennessee besieged the city, threatening to starve the Union forces into surrender. Bragg's troops occupied Missionary Ridge and Lookout Mountain, both of which had excellent views of the city, the river, and the Union's supply lines. Confederate troops launched raids on all supply wagons heading toward Chattanooga, which made it necessary for the Union to find another way to feed their men. Maj. Gen. Ulysses S. Grant relieved Rosecrans of his command and replaced him with Maj. Gen. George H. Thomas. Grant's first priority upon reaching Chattanooga was to resupply the Union army.

=== Brown's Ferry operation ===
Grant and Thomas initiated the "Cracker Line Operation" on October 26, 1863. It was designed to open the road to Chattanooga from Brown's Ferry on the Tennessee River with a simultaneous advance up Lookout Valley, securing the Kelley's Ferry Road. Brig. Gen. William F. "Baldy" Smith, Chief Engineer of the Military Division of the Mississippi, who conceived the overall Cracker Line plan, was assigned the task of establishing the Brown's Ferry bridgehead. He was assigned two infantry brigades from the 3rd Division, XIV Corps, to accomplish this: the 1st Brigade under Brig. Gen. John B. Turchin and the 2nd under Brig. Gen. William B. Hazen.

At 3:00 a.m. on October 27, portions of Hazen's brigade embarked upon pontoons and floated around Moccasin Bend to Brown's Ferry. Turchin's brigade took a position on Moccasin Bend across from Brown's Ferry. Upon landing, Hazen secured the bridgehead and then positioned a pontoon bridge across the river, allowing Turchin to cross and take position on his right.

Col. William C. Oates of the Confederate 15th Alabama guarded the valley with his regiment plus elements of other units. Due to a command mixup, Oates did not know where three reserve regiments were positioned. After the Union surprise landing, Oates attempted a counterattack with his scratch force, but it failed after he was seriously wounded. By the time Brig. Gen. Evander M. Law turned up with those reserve regiments, it was too late; the Federals were too numerous and well entrenched.

=== Hooker's advance ===
Meanwhile, Maj. Gen. Joseph Hooker marched with three Union divisions from Bridgeport by following the railroad via Shellmound and the Running Water Creek gorge. On October 28, after a rapid march, Hooker's column entered Lookout Valley to the astonishment of Confederate Generals Braxton Bragg and James Longstreet, who were having a conference on Lookout Mountain. Longstreet, obsessed with the possibility of a Union attack further to the southwest, had failed to properly scout Hooker's advance.

Hooker, while his force passed through Lookout Valley on October 28, detached Brig. Gen. John W. Geary's division at Wauhatchie Station, a stop on the Nashville and Chattanooga Railroad, to protect the line of communications to the southwest as well as the road west to Kelley's Ferry. Once he reached his goal, "Hooker's dispositions were deplorable," with Howard's understrength XI Corps "bivouacked haphazardly" at Brown's Ferry. Worse, Geary's division, only 1,500-strong after detaching railroad guards, was posted in isolation.

== Battle ==
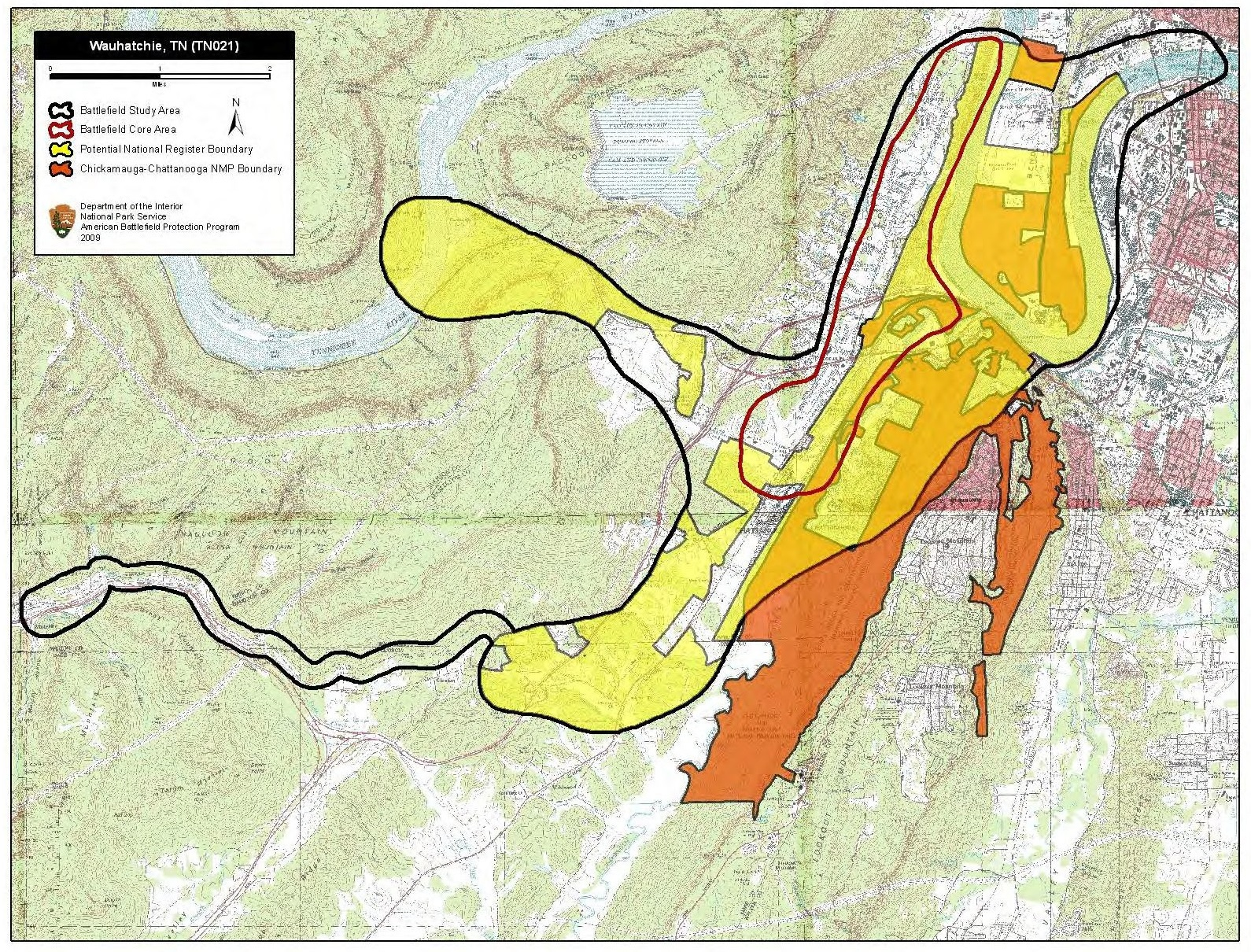
Map of Wauhatchie Battlefield core and study areas by the American Battlefield Protection Program

Bragg ordered Longstreet to drive away the new Union force. Noting that a wagon train had stopped near Wauhatchie, Longstreet determined to crush Geary's force. He ordered Brig. Gen. Micah Jenkins's division to mount a night attack on the Union forces. While Law took his own and Brig. Gen. Jerome B. Robertson's brigades to block Hooker from reinforcing Geary, Jenkins's own 1,800-man South Carolina brigade, led by Col. John Bratton, would assault Wauhatchie Station. Law had Brig. Gen. Henry Benning's brigade remain in support for both Law's and Bratton's efforts. Although the attack was scheduled for 10:00 p.m. on the night of October 28, confusion delayed it until midnight. Though Geary and his officers expected an attack and had thrown out pickets, its suddenness took them by surprise. Enveloped from the north by Bratton, the Union defenders formed into a V-shaped battle line, facing north and east. Geary's son, an artillery lieutenant, was killed in the battle, dying in his father's arms.

Hearing the sounds of battle, the XI Corps quickly fell into ranks near Brown's Ferry. Hooker bypassed Maj. Gen. Oliver O. Howard in the chain of command and ordered Maj. Gen. Carl Schurz to march to Wauhatchie Station as reinforcements. In the confusion, Brig. Gen. Adolph von Steinwehr got his division on the road first. Col. Orland Smith's brigade of Steinwehr's division was fired on by Law's Confederates, who were positioned on a 200-foot (61 m) high hill that dominated the road from Brown's Ferry. Smith veered to the east and began climbing the hill. Meanwhile, Hooker mistakenly deployed units from both XI Corps divisions against Law and Benning, leaving no one to go to Geary's aid. Though Law's 2,000 men were greatly outnumbered by Hooker's force, the hilltop position was naturally strong. In the darkness, the only unit in direct contact with Law was Smith's 700-man brigade. Several vigorous assaults by Smith were repulsed. Then, after Law received some erroneous reports, he decided to pull back. Just as his men left their entrenchments, Smith's men spilled over them, capturing some stragglers and scattering a regiment that had failed to get the order to retreat. Meanwhile, Hooker agreed to let Howard proceed to Wauhatchie with some cavalry.

Geary's men continued to hold fast, though they began to run low on ammunition. Just as Bratton began to sense victory, he received a note to retreat since Union reinforcements were arriving at his rear. Bratton withdrew to Lookout Mountain, successfully covered by Benning's brigade. In the Wauhatchie fight, Bratton lost 356 men, while Geary's casualties numbered 216.

== Aftermath ==
A rumor circulated through the Union camps that Union mules stampeded by the fight had made the Confederates believe they were being attacked by cavalry, causing the Southern retreat; the Union soldiers joked that the mules be "breveted as horses". In truth, the Hampton Legion was disordered by the mules for only a short time. However, this lull allowed the 137th New York to plug a gap in the Federal line.

Union losses in the battle were 78 killed, 327 wounded, and 15 missing. The Confederates reported their losses as 34 killed, 305 wounded, and 69 missing. One account says Bratton lost 408 men while Law lost only 52. Geary reported burying 153 Confederates and capturing over one hundred prisoners, so the Confederate losses may have been over 900 men. The Union army now had its window to the outside and could receive supplies, weapons, ammunition, and reinforcements via the Cracker Line. The way was clear for the start of the Battles for Chattanooga on November 23.
