= Aron Maberry =

American politician (born 1985)

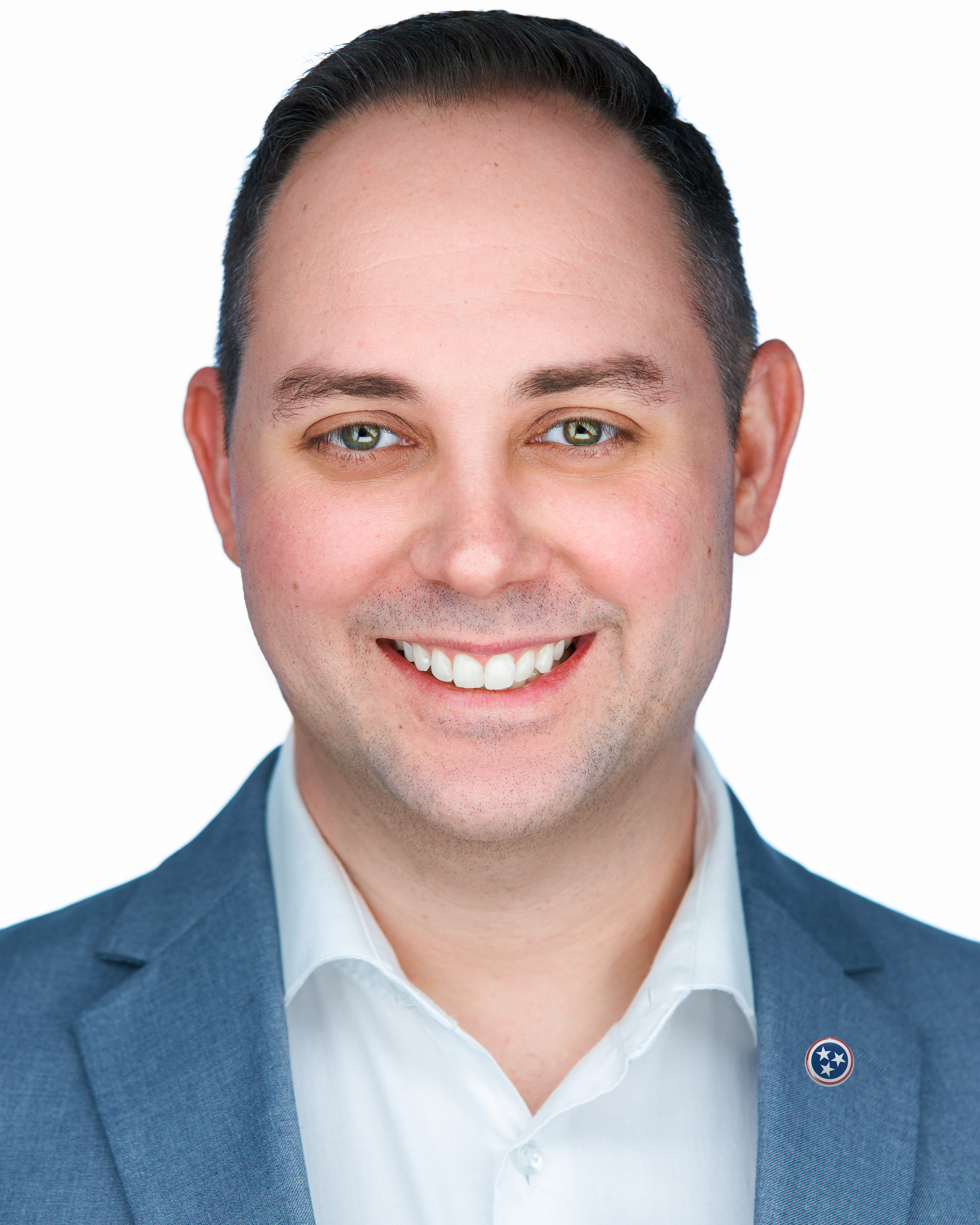
- Maberry in 2024

Member of the Tennessee House of Representatives from the 68th district
- Incumbent
- Assumed office January 14, 2025
- Preceded by: Curtis Johnson

Personal details
- Born: April 15, 1985 (age 41) Altus, Oklahoma, U.S.
- Party: Republican
- Spouse: Elizabeth
- Children: 3
- Education: Valor Christian College (BA)
- Occupation: Politician; pastor
- Website: House website Campaign website

Aron Maberry (born April 15, 1985) is an American pastor and Republican politician serving in the Tennessee House of Representatives for the 68th district, which covers parts of Montgomery County. He was elected in 2024 and assumed office in January 2025. Maberry is also a member of the Clarksville-Montgomery County School Board.

== Early life and education ==
Aron Maberry was born on April 15, 1985, in Altus, Oklahoma, and raised in Clarksville, Tennessee. He graduated from Rossview High School in 2003. He later attended Valor Christian College and earned a BA in pastoral leadership, graduating cum laude in 2007.

== Career ==
=== Pastoral work ===
Maberry has served as a pastor on a church staff since 2005 and is currently an associate pastor at Mosaic Church in Clarksville, Tennessee. He joined Mosaic Church (formerly known as The Tabernacle Church) in 2015. Since that time, the church has grown from approximately 250 weekly attendees to 3,000 as of 2025, becoming one of the most diverse congregations in the state of Tennessee.

In 2019, Mosaic—then operating under its original name—was ranked the 57th fastest-growing church in America by Outreach. In 2025, Mosaic Church was again recognized, ranking 33rd on the magazine's annual list of fastest-growing churches in the United States.

=== Legislative work ===
Maberry was elected to the Tennessee House of Representatives in 2024 to represent the 68th district, which includes parts of Montgomery County. He took office on January 14, 2025, as a member of the Republican Party. In his first legislative session, he served on the Education Administration Committee, the K-12 Subcommittee, the Transportation Committee, and the Government Operations Committee. Maberry quickly became known for his legislative productivity and was recognized for having the sixth-highest bill passage rate among the 99 members of the House.

== Community involvement ==
=== School board ===
In 2022, Maberry was elected to the Clarksville-Montgomery County School Board, becoming the first elected Republican to serve on the board. He advocated for increased public participation, infrastructure funding, and curriculum transparency.

=== 2023 Clarksville tornado relief ===
In December 2023, following a devastating EF3 tornado that struck Clarksville, Tennessee, Maberry was actively involved in the local relief and recovery efforts. As a local church leader and elected school board member, he helped coordinate volunteer efforts through Mosaic Church and worked alongside first responders, city officials, and nonprofit organizations to provide aid to affected families. Maberry assisted in distributing essential supplies, organizing cleanup teams, and raising awareness about local needs in the aftermath of the storm.

He later highlighted the resilience of the Clarksville-Montgomery County community and advocated for long-term infrastructure improvements and emergency preparedness funding to support recovery and future disaster response.

=== Tennessee House of Representatives ===
Maberry was elected to the Tennessee House in November 2024. He serves on the Education Administration, K-12 Subcommittee, Transportation, and Government Operations Committees. In his first session, Maberry was recognized for having the sixth-highest bill passage rate in the House of Representatives during the 2025 legislative session.

He sponsored and passed multiple bills related to education, veterans’ services, and diversity policy, including:

- HB310: Recognizes PTSD among first responders as work-related for workers’ compensation.
- HB524: Expands access to veterans treatment courts across counties.
- HB825: Enacts the Teen Social Media and Internet Safety Act, establishing guardrails to protect minors from harmful content and addictive algorithms on social media platforms.
- HB622: Dismantles DEI-based hiring practices in local government.
- HB923: Eliminates DEI offices in state and local government bodies.

Maberry also co-sponsored the Education Freedom Scholarship Act, supporting school choice and the expansion of education savings accounts for eligible Tennessee families. He publicly advocated for the legislation, describing it as “a win for all students” and emphasizing its potential to empower parents and improve educational outcomes across the state.

In addition to his legislative work, Maberry campaigned on securing critical infrastructure investments for District 68. In 2025, the Tennessee Department of Transportation (TDOT) announced $68 million in funding to widen Rossview Road from International Boulevard to Kirkwood Road as part of its statewide 10-year strategic plan—an initiative Maberry publicly championed.

Maberry also prioritized healthcare expansion in his campaign. In July 2025, both TriStar Clarksville and Saint Thomas Clarksville were granted Certificates of Need by the Tennessee Health Facilities Commission, clearing the way for the construction of two new hospitals in Montgomery County—effectively fulfilling a key campaign promise to address the region's long-standing healthcare access challenges.

== Recognition ==
In December 2022, Clarksville Now selected Maberry as one of its “10 under 40,” which highlighted him among the top 10 most influential local leaders under age 40 for his contributions to community service, church leadership, and public education governance.

In 2023, Maberry served on the Clarksville-Montgomery County School Board, which was recognized by the Tennessee School Boards Association as the School Board of the Year. The award honored the board's governance effectiveness, student-focused initiatives, and innovative leadership.

In April 2025, Maberry was appointed as a Deputy Whip in the Tennessee House Republican Caucus by House Majority Whip Johnny Garrett. He was one of six state representatives selected to serve in this leadership role for the 114th General Assembly.

As Deputy Whip, Maberry assists in counting votes and communicating with Republican caucus members about the supermajority's position on key legislative issues. In announcing the appointment, Garrett praised Maberry's “passion and dedication to serving the House Republican Caucus and the Volunteer State,” stating confidence in the team's effectiveness. Maberry expressed gratitude for the opportunity, saying he looked forward to “working with Republican colleagues to pass legislation that improves the lives of all Tennesseans.”

In 2025, Maberry was recognized by the Tennessee House Republican Caucus for having the sixth-highest bill passage rate out of all 99 members of the Tennessee House of Representatives, reflecting his legislative effectiveness during his first year in office.

== Personal life ==
Maberry has been married to Elizabeth Maberry since 2006. They have three children and reside in Clarksville, Tennessee.

== Electoral history ==
=== 2024 ===
2024 Tennessee House of Representatives District 68 Republican Primary
Party	Candidate	Votes	%
Republican	Aron Maberry	2,568	43.33%
Republican	Joe Smith	2,210	37.29%
Republican	Carol Duffin	726	12.25%
Republican	Greg Gilman	422	7.12%
Total votes		5,926	100.00%

2024 Tennessee House of Representatives District 68 general election
Party	Candidate	Votes	%
Republican	Aron Maberry	23,249	67.98%
Democratic	Garfield Scott	10,950	32.02%
Total votes		34,199	100.00%
Republican hold			
