= Pat Marsh =

American politician (born 1949)

Speaker pro tempore of the Tennessee House of Representatives
- Incumbent
- Assumed office January 12, 2021
- Preceded by: Bill Dunn

Member of the Tennessee House of Representatives from the 62nd district
- Incumbent
- Assumed office October 13, 2009
- Preceded by: Curt Cobb

Personal details
- Born: January 6, 1949 (age 77) Fayetteville, Tennessee, U.S.
- Party: Republican
- Education: University of Tennessee (BA)
- Website: Campaign website

Pat Marsh (born January 6, 1949, in Fayetteville, Tennessee) is an American politician and a Republican member of the Tennessee House of Representatives representing the 62nd district since winning the special election on October 13, 2009, to fill the vacancy caused by the resignation of Representative Curt Cobb.

In 2023, Marsh supported a resolution to expel three Democratic lawmakers from the legislature for violating decorum rules. The expulsion was widely characterized as unprecedented.

== Education ==
Marsh earned his BS in business and transportation from the University of Tennessee.

== Elections ==
- 2012 Marsh was unopposed for both the August 2, 2012, Republican Primary, winning with 3,008 votes, and the November 6, 2012, general election, winning with 15,423 votes.
- 2009 In the District 62 special election to succeed Democratic Representative Curt Cobb, March ran in the four-way August 27, 2009, Republican Primary, winning with 1,826 votes (69.7%), and won the three-way October 13, 2009, general election with 4,931 votes (55.7%) against Democratic nominee Ty Cobb and Independent candidate Christopher Brown.
- 2010 Marsh was challenged in the August 5, 2010, Republican Primary, winning with 6,087 votes (87.3%), and won the November 2, 2010, general election with 11,931 votes (74.8%) against Democratic nominee Jenny Hunt.

Tennessee House of Representatives
Preceded by Bill Dunn	Speaker pro tempore of the Tennessee House of Representatives; 2021–present	Incumbent
