= Tennessee House of Representatives 25th district =

State legislative district in Tennessee

Tennessee's 25th State House of Representatives district
- Map of Tennessee House districts with the 25th District shaded in red
Representative
Cameron Sexton; R–Crossville
since 2011
- Demographics: 92.6% White; 0.7% Black; 4.1% Hispanic; 0.3% Asian; 2.2% Multiracial
- Population (2024): 73,440

The Tennessee House of Representatives 25th district is one of the 99 legislative districts in the lower house of the Tennessee General Assembly. The district is located in Middle and covers all of Cumberland and the eastern half of Putnam counties. The main settlement in the area is Crossville, Tennessee, others include Pleasant Hill, Monterey, and Crab Orchard. There are also resort communities such as Fairfield Glade, and Lake Tansi. Cameron Sexton has represented the district since 2011.

== Demographics ==
The Tennessee Comptroller estimates the population as of 2024 at 73,440.

- 92.6% of the district is White
- 4.1% of the district is Hispanic
- 0.7% of the district is African American
- 0.3% of the district is Asian
- 2.2% of the district is Two or more races

Detailed demographic information is also available through Census Reporter.

== History ==
The 88th Tennessee General Assembly was the first in which all districts were numbered. At this time, the 25th district was in Hamilton County, Tennessee. From the 89th to the 92nd GAs, it was made up of Bledsoe, Hamilton and Rhea counties. During the 93rd GA, Bledsoe was removed. From the 94th-102nd GAs, it was made up of Rhea and part of Cumberland counties. From the 103rd-107th GAs, it was made up of Cumberland and part of Bledsoe counties. From the 108th-112th GAs, it was made up of all or part of Cumberland, Van Buren, and Putnam counties. It has been only Cumberland and part of Putnam counties since the 113th General Assembly.

== List of Representatives ==
Representative	Party	Years of Service	General Assembly	Hometown
Cameron Sexton	Republican	2011 – present	107th-114th	Crossville
Eric Swafford	Republican	2005 – 2010	104th-106th	Pikeville
Raymond Walker	Republican	1997 – 2004	100th-103rd	Crossville
Shirley Duer	Republican	1985 – 1996	94th-99th	Cookeville
Foster Elsea	Republican	1983 – 1984	93rd	Spring City
Bill Carter	Republican	1975 – 1982	89th-92nd	Spring CIty
David Copeland	Republican	1973 – 1974	88th	Chattanooga
