= Tommy Head =

American politician (1945–2024)

Member of the Tennessee House of Representatives from the 68th district
- In office January 13, 1987 – January 11, 2005
- Preceded by: Stan Darnell
- Succeeded by: Curtis Johnson

Personal details
- Born: June 4, 1945 Robertson County, Tennessee, U.S.
- Died: October 19, 2024 (aged 79)
- Party: Democratic
- Spouse: Deloris Brown
- Children: 2
- Relatives: Pat Head Summitt (sister)
- Education: Austin Peay State University (BS)
- Website: House website

James Thomas Head (June 4, 1945 – October 19, 2024) was an American politician from the state of Tennessee. A Democrat, he was a member of that state's House of Representatives. He was also a farmer and a utility contractor.

== Life and career ==
Head was born in Robertson County, Tennessee, on June 4, 1945. He was a 1965 graduate of Cumberland College in Lebanon, Tennessee, with an associate's degree, and a 1967 graduate of Austin Peay State University in Clarksville, Tennessee. He taught high school and coached basketball for two years after his university graduation. He was the brother of legendary women's basketball coach Pat Head Summitt.

In 1986, Head was elected to the Tennessee House of Representatives and served nine terms until being defeated for reelection in 2004. He served District 68. While in the House he served as the chairman of several subcommittees and the vice-chairman of several committees, mostly those dealing with finance. He was regarded as one of the chamber's most powerful Middle Tennessee-based members at one point. He died on October 19, 2024, at the age of 79.

== Public office ==
- House member of the 95th through 103rd General Assemblies
- Chair, House Finance, Ways and Means Committee
- Member, House Transportation Committee
- Member, House Calendar and Rules Committee
- Member House Public Transportation & Highways Subcommittee
- Member, Joint Select Oversight Committee on Education
- Member, Joint Fiscal Review Committee
- Member, Joint Pensions and Insurance Committee
- Member, Joint TACR Committee

== Community involvement ==
- Clarksville Area Chamber of Commerce
- Austin Peay State University Tower Club
- Tennessee Farm Bureau
- Tennessee Sheriffs Association
- EDC Executive Committee
