= Bill Dunn (American politician) =

American politician (born 1961)

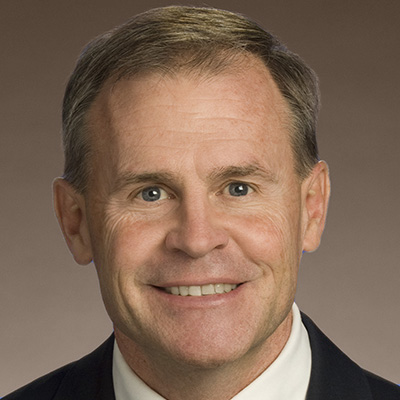

Speaker of the Tennessee House of Representatives Acting
- In office August 2, 2019 – August 23, 2019
- Preceded by: Glen Casada
- Succeeded by: Cameron Sexton

Speaker pro tempore of the Tennessee House of Representatives
- In office January 8, 2019 – January 12, 2021
- Preceded by: Curtis Johnson
- Succeeded by: Pat Marsh

Member of the Tennessee House of Representatives from the 16th district
- In office January 20, 1994 – January 12, 2021
- Preceded by: Charles Severance
- Succeeded by: Michele Carringer

Personal details
- Born: July 3, 1961 (age 65) Panama Canal Zone, U.S.
- Party: Republican
- Spouse: Stacy Dunn
- Children: 5
- Education: University of Tennessee, Knoxville (BS, MS)

William K. Dunn (born July 3, 1961) is an American politician, a Republican, and the former Acting-Speaker of the Tennessee House of Representatives. Rep. Dunn announced on September 12, 2019, that he would not seek re-election to his post.

== Early life and education ==
Bill Dunn was born July 3, 1961, in the Panama Canal Zone to Paul and Mary Dunn. Dunn and his wife Stacy have five children and are members of Holy Ghost Catholic Church of Knoxville, Tennessee.

Dunn first earned a Bachelor of Science degree in animal science during 1983 and later completed a Master of Science degree in Extension Education from the University of Tennessee during 1985. Dunn worked as a federal employee for the U.S. Agricultural Extension Service as a 4-H agent in Grainger County, Tennessee, for approximately eight years. Dunn reportedly received several awards for his work in 4-H youth development. Dunn is a certified arborist and General Manager of Cortese Tree Specialists of Knoxville. Dunn is now employed by QualPro.

== Tennessee House of Representatives ==
Dunn has served as a state representative following his moving back to Knox County as to buy his parents' home during 1993 and later being elected to the 99th Tennessee General Assembly during 1994. Dunn represents the 16th district of the Fountain City, Halls Crossroads, and Powell areas of Knoxville, and part of Knox County.

Prior to December 2006, Dunn served as the House Republican Leader. Afterward, he was appointed by his successor as Republican Leader to be the freshman coordinator for the House Republican Caucus. Currently, Bill Dunn is the Vice Chair of the House Public Transportation and Highways Subcommittee. He is a member of the House Agriculture Committee, the House Finance Ways and Means Committee, the House Government Operations Committee, the House Calendar and Rules Committee, the House Public Transportation and Highways Subcommittee, and the House Environment Subcommittee.^{1}

On June 9, 2020, Dunn voted as a member of the House Naming, Designating, & Private Acts Committee against removal of a bust honoring Ku Klux Klan Grand Wizard Nathan Bedford Forrest from the Tennessee State Capitol building.

== Tennessee Right to Life, Inc. ==
Dunn's wife, Stacy Dunn, currently receives annual compensation of $23,400 as a vice president of Tennessee Right to Life, Inc. and his father Paul Dunn was a former president and manager of the Knoxville affiliate chapter of Tennessee Right to Life, Inc. Paul Dunn once allegedly extended an offer for the "Knoxville Right to Life" (sic; Knox County affiliate of Tennessee Right to Life) to pick up the hotel bill for Neal Horsley to speak on a March 13, 2003, event then sponsored by the University of Tennessee Pro-Life Collegians at the University Center auditorium on the University of Tennessee campus in Knoxville.

Tennessee House of Representatives
Preceded by Curtis Johnson	Speaker pro tempore of the Tennessee House of Representatives; 2019–2021	Succeeded by Pat Marsh
Political offices
Preceded by Glen Casada	Speaker of the Tennessee House of Representatives; Acting; 2019	Succeeded by Cameron Sexton
