= Rod Parsley =

American pastor (born 1957)

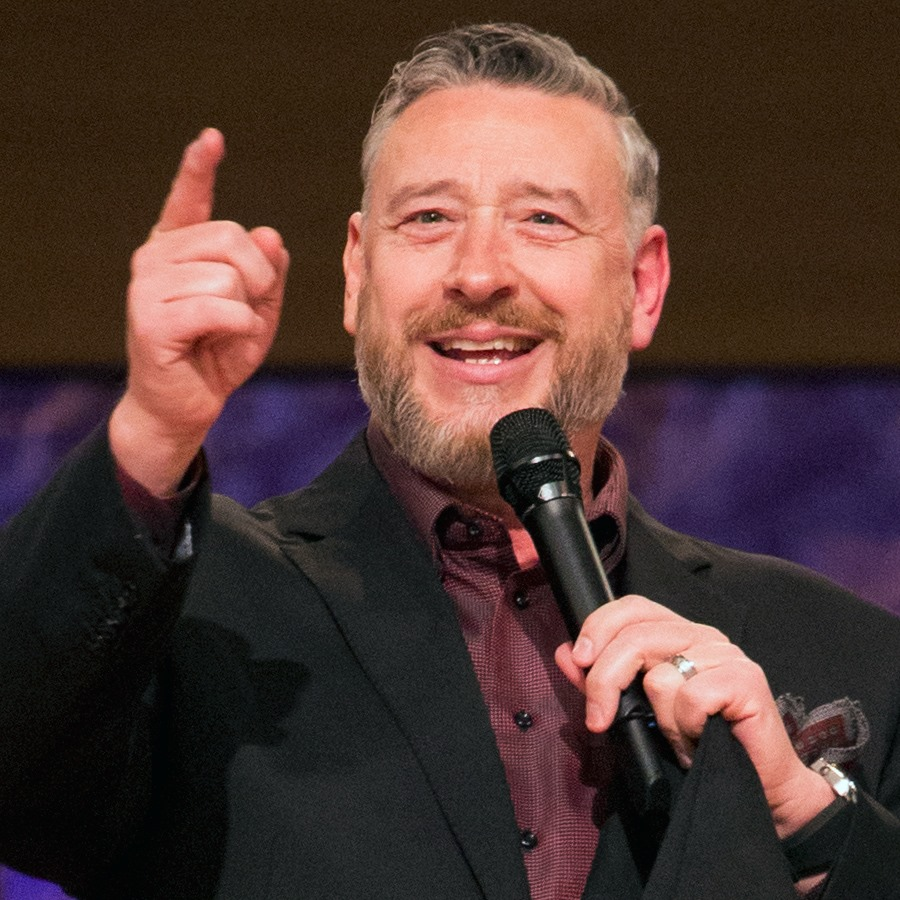
- Parsley at World Harvest Church in 2015
- Title: Senior Pastor

Personal life
- Born: Rodney Lee Parsley; January 13, 1957 (age 69) Cleveland, Ohio, U.S.
- Home town: Columbus, Ohio
- Spouse: Joni Parsley (m. 1986)
- Children: Ashton Blaire Parsley, Austin Chandler Parsley
- Parent(s): James and Ellen Parsley
- Website: RodParsley.com

Religious life
- Religion: Christianity
- Denomination: Non-denominational Christianity, Pentecostal, Evangelical
- Church: World Harvest Church

Senior posting
- Based in: Columbus, Ohio
- Period in office: c. 1977 – present

Rodney Lee Parsley (born January 13, 1957) is an American Christian minister, author, television host and evangelist. He is senior pastor of World Harvest Church, a large nondenominational church in Canal Winchester, Ohio; a suburb of Columbus, which has a sister campus in Elkhart, Indiana.

Parsley is the founder and chancellor of Valor Christian College. He is the founder and president of The Center for Moral Clarity, a Christian grassroots advocacy organization, as well as the founder of Breakthrough (a media ministry), the Bridge of Hope missions organization, Harvest Preparatory School, World Harvest Ministerial Alliance, The Women's Clinic of Columbus, and RODPARSLEY.TV, a 24/7 online streaming channel. His television program, Breakthrough with Rod Parsley, airs daily on the Daystar TV Network, and The Word Network.

== Early life and education ==
Parsley was born in Cleveland, Ohio, and was raised primarily in the Columbus area. His parents had grown up in eastern Kentucky, and his family traveled there often to visit relatives when Parsley was a young boy. He still speaks with a noticeable Kentucky accent.

Parsley was raised as a Free Will Baptist. At 8 years old, Parsley had a salvation experience during a revival in a small Pentecostal church outside of Columbus. As a teenager, Parsley encountered the Baptism of the Holy Spirit at Christian Center Church in Gahanna, Ohio, giving him a wider perspective of the church and his eventual call to the ministry

After graduating from high school, he worked in real estate and at a pet-food factory. Through a series of various events, Parsley made the decision go into the work of ministry. He enrolled at Circleville Bible College (now Ohio Christian University), but dropped out after two years.

As a young pastor, Parsley was strongly influenced by Lester Sumrall, an Indiana-based evangelist, missionary and broadcaster. Sumrall became Parsley's mentor, and the two traveled together often.

== Personal life ==
He is married to Joni Parsley. They have a son, Austin, and a daughter, Ashton. They live near Pickerington, a suburb of Columbus.

== World Harvest Church ==
Parsley founded his church in 1977, after leading a Bible study in his parents' backyard while still a college student. Seventeen people attended the first meeting. They soon decided that the Bible study group should become a church. It originally became known as Sonrise Chapel, and later Word of Life Church.

The church's first permanent facility was built in 1979. This is now known as Alpha Hall, one of four buildings on what for many years was the campus of Valor Christian College (the college moved to the main church campus in 2011). Growth soon required an addition to that building, and several years later the church built a bigger structure adjacent to Alpha Hall, now known as Dominion Hall. In 1986, ground was broken on 57 acres (230,000 m^{2}) to begin what is now the church's main campus in Canal Winchester (with a Columbus address). When it was dedicated, it was renamed as World Harvest Church in honor of Lester Sumrall, who had befriended Parsley years earlier and became the younger pastor's mentor and spiritual father.

World Harvest Church Columbus now includes a 5,200-seat sanctuary, children's and youth ministries, Connect Centers and administrative offices. Harvest Preparatory School, a private Christian school serving students in preschool through grade 12, and Valor Christian College also operate on the church grounds. About 10,000 people attend services at World Harvest on a weekly basis.

In 2013, World Harvest added a satellite campus in Elkhart. That church is located near Christian Center Church in South Bend, the church founded by Parsley's mentor, Sumrall.

== Other ministry activities ==
Breakthrough is an outreach of Bridge of Hope, an international missions organization. Over the past 20 years, Parsley has led numerous humanitarian projects around the world, supported by gifts from his church members, churches affiliated with the World Harvest Ministerial Alliance and television viewers. Bridge of Hope has an exhaustive record of work in Sudan, where a civil war has persisted for years. His involvement with Sudan began with his lobbying for the federal Sudan Peace Act, and has encompassed the purchase of freedom for Sudanese Christian slaves as well as food, medical supplies and equipment for freed slaves. Bridge of Hope has purchased the freedom of more than 31,000 slaves and provided more than 16,000 "survival kits" — aid packages consisting of a tarp, mosquito netting, a cooking pot and food to sustain a family for a month.

Bridge of Hope has also completed projects in the African nations of Zambia, Uganda, Kenya and Mozambique. The organization's history also includes projects in Europe, Asia, South America, Central America and the Caribbean. its most recent international projects have been in Haiti (both before and after the January 2010 earthquake there) and Guatemala.

Domestically, Bridge of Hope has been involved in disaster relief, providing food, water, ice and cleaning supplies in the wake of disasters including Hurricanes Katrina, Gustav and Ike. Following these disasters, Bridge of Hope was named a First Responder by FEMA.

Valor Christian College was founded in 1990 as World Harvest Bible Institute, and was later known as World Harvest Bible College. It attracts students from across the United States and around the world for ministry training in pastoral leadership, missions, evangelism, music ministry, youth ministry, media ministry, advanced leadership and interdisciplinary studies. It is accredited by the Ohio Department of Higher Education to offer associate of applied science degrees.

Parsley is also the host of Dominion Camp-Meeting, an annual summer conference held on the World Harvest Church campus. The conference attracts thousands of Christians from all around the world and has served as a global platform to well-known speakers such as Bishop T.D. Jakes, Joyce Meyer, Steven Furtick, Juanita Bynum, and many others

== Political activism ==
Parsley is a political independent. He is a critic of liberal positions on social issues, including abortion and the movement to expand the definition of marriage to include same-sex couples. He has also worked on behalf of prison re-entry legislation, women's rights initiatives and anti-poverty programs. His most recent book, Living on Our Heads, singles out Chris Matthews, Bart Stupak, Mia Farrow and the late Christopher Hitchens for praise.

Parsley became increasingly involved in U.S. politics following his work on the 2003 Partial-Birth Abortion Ban Act. During the summer of 2004, Parsley announced the establishment of the Center for Moral Clarity. He openly criticized Sweden for the conviction of Åke Green under Sweden's hate crimes legislation.

On October 3, 2004, Parsley gave a sermon titled "Uncensored: While Freedom Still Rings". In the two-part sermon, Parsley expressed opposition to the view that there is a separation of church and state in the U.S. Constitution; same-sex marriage; partial-birth abortion; hate speech legislation in California, Canada, and Sweden; sexual orientation themes in children's books; racism; and poverty. Parsley has said that the U.S. government, by funding Planned Parenthood, is complicit in black genocide, that is, genocide against African Americans, because Planned Parenthood performs abortions in the black community.

A few weeks before the 2004 elections, Parsley encouraged both his congregation and his television audience to vote for Ohio's state constitutional amendment which defines marriage as the union between one man and one woman. The amendment passed by a wide margin of votes from both political parties. Parsley has also encouraged citizens of other states with similar marriage amendments on their ballots to vote similarly, and he headlined the "Silent No More" tour in order to register Christian voters.

== Writings ==
Parsley is an author of several books, including Silent No More, which was released in April 2005 by Charisma House. The book encourages Christians to participate in the political process, and especially to make sure their votes reflect their values. Concerning poverty, Parsley writes that government should "get out of the way," removing many constraints on capitalism. "If the government were to reduce the level of taxation, remove industrial restraints, eliminate wage controls, and abolish subsidies, tariffs, and other constraints on free enterprise," he writes, "the poor would be helped in a way that AFDC, social security, and unemployment insurance could never match."

The sequel, Culturally Incorrect: How Clashing Worldviews Affect Your Future, was published in June 2007 and soon appeared on the industry's best-seller lists. "Culturally Incorrect" identifies postmodernism - the belief that there is no such thing as absolute truth - as the cause of many of the culture's major ills, and calls upon Christians to impact the culture through prayer, service to the poor and activism. A third book on Christian moral action, Living on Our Heads: Righting an Upside-Down Culture, was released in August 2010.

His latest book is called Grace: Uncovered, Unfiltered, Undeserved, released in November 2018.

== McCain 2008 endorsement ==
Parsley personally endorsed the presidential campaign of Republican nominee John McCain, who called Parsley a "spiritual guide". McCain had actively sought Parsley's endorsement during his Republican primary battle with Mike Huckabee, who was drawing substantial support from the religious right.

McCain later rejected Parsley's endorsement based on Parsley's statements regarding Islam. Parsley was quoted as stating that he "do[es] not believe that our country can truly fulfill its divine purpose until we understand America was founded, in part, with the intention of seeing this false religion destroyed" and that Muhammad is "the mouthpiece of a conspiracy of spiritual evil".

In repudiating Parsley's comments, McCain stated, "I believe there is no place for that kind of dialogue in America, and I believe that even though he endorsed me, and I didn't endorse him, the fact is that I repudiate such talk, and I reject his endorsement." McCain further distanced himself from Parsley, stating, "I've never been in Pastor Hagee's church or Pastor Parsley's church. I didn't attend their church for 20 years, and I'm not a member of their church. I received their endorsement, which did not mean that I endorsed their views."

Thereafter, Parsley withdrew his endorsement of McCain's candidacy.

== Criticism of Parsley ==
Parsley has been identified as a prominent player in the so-called dominionist movement by both TheocracyWatch and commentator Bill Moyers.

Some have criticized Parsley's book, Silent No More, because of the book's description of Islam and its view that the United States Constitution provides for a separation of church and state (among other social issues), and for his support of faith healing. Parsley supports the claim that Islam is an enemy of both the United States and Christianity.

In January 2006, a group of 31 Columbus, Ohio-area pastors charged that Parsley and another central Ohio religious leader had violated federal tax laws. The complaining clergy alleged that Parsley violated the tax-exempt status of his church by supporting various political causes.

Author Chris Hedges' 2006 book American Fascists: The Christian Right and the War on America quoted Parsley as using militaristic metaphors in a sermon concerning his critics:

The secular media never likes it when I say this, so let me say it twice. Man your battle stations! Ready your weapons! They say this rhetoric is so inciting. I came to incite a riot. ... Man your battle stations. Ready your weapons. Lock and load — for the thirty, forty liberal pastors who filed against our ministry with the Internal Revenue Service. ... Let the struggle begin. Let it begin in your heart today with a shout unto him who has called us to war — not only that, he has empowered you and I to win.

== Cancer ==
In 2015, Parsley was treated for vocal cord cancer, but has since recovered.
