= ITT Technical Institute =

Former for-profit technical institute

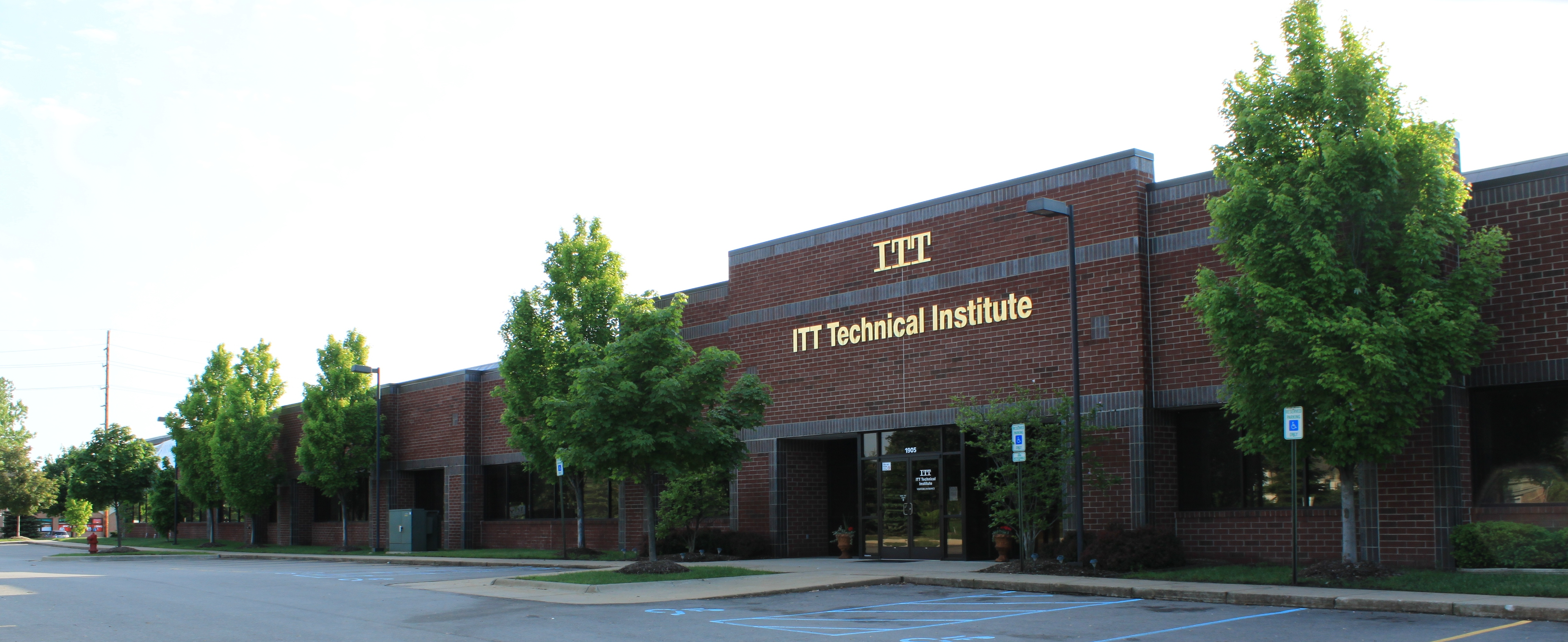
- ITT Tech's Canton, Michigan campus
- Motto: Education for the Future
- Type: Private for-profit technical institute
- Active: 1969–2016
- Affiliations: ITT Educational Services, Inc. (1994–2016); ITT Corporation (1965–1994)
- Chairman: Darvey W. Hayes
- President: Eugene W. Feichtner
- Students: 40,015
- Location: Carmel, Indiana, United States
- Campus locations: Approximately 130 campuses

ITT Technical Institute (ITT Tech) was a private for-profit technical institute with its headquarters in Carmel, Indiana and many campuses throughout the United States. Founded in 1969 and growing to 130 campuses in 38 states of the United States, ITT Tech was one of the largest for-profit educators in the US before it closed in 2016.

The institute was owned and operated by ITT Educational Services, Inc., a publicly traded company headquartered in Carmel. The company also owned and operated the Breckinridge School of Nursing and Health Sciences schools.

In 1999, two former ITT employees brought forth a lawsuit alleging the school used illegal recruitment practices, saying the school was "abusing that system for years and ripping off the government for billions of dollars." In 2004, the Justice Department initiated a criminal investigation into ITT colleges in eight states.

Following state and federal investigations, the United States Department of Education prevented students from using federally guaranteed student loans at ITT Tech locations in August 2016. All ITT Tech campuses were closed the following month and ITT Tech filed for bankruptcy.

In 2018, ITT Tech's court-appointed bankruptcy trustee sued the United States Department of Education and lenders to pay $1.5 billion in claims against ITT, alleging that in allowing loans to low-income ITT students, regulators neglected their oversight duties. Three years later, the US Department of Education allocated $1.1 billion in loan relief to an additional 115,000 former ITT Tech students.

== History ==
ITT Educational Services, Inc.
- Formerly: Educational Services, Inc. (1946-1965)
- Type: Public
- Traded as: Expert Market: ESINQ
- Founded: 1946; 80 years ago
- Defunct: September 6, 2016; 10 years ago
- Fate: Bankruptcy
- Headquarters: Carmel, Indiana
- Key people: Kevin Modany (President, CEO, COO, Director)
- Parent: ITT Corporation (1965-1999)

In 1946, ITT Tech was established as Educational Services, Inc. From 1965 until its IPO in 1994, ITT Tech was a wholly owned subsidiary of the ITT Corporation (as "ITT/ESI"). During its years in operation, it was based in Carmel, Indiana. By 1986, all its institutions had become known by the common name "ITT Technical Institute." By 1999, ITT Corporation had divested itself completely of ITT Tech's shares. The schools were allowed to continue using the "ITT" name under license.

In the mid-2000s, CEO Rene Champagne cashed out more than $50 million in stock, before stepping down from the position in 2007. Kevin Modany was appointed as CEO, while maintaining all of the positions (president, COO, and director) he had held from early June 2002.

It acquired the financially struggling Daniel Webster College (DWC) in Nashua, New Hampshire in June 2009 for $29.3 million. The nonprofit college converted into a for-profit institution. In 2013, ESI began operating public charter schools in three cities: Indianapolis, Tempe, and Troy, Michigan. In charter documents, the company referred to potential students as "educational have-nots."

ITT Technical Institute charged among the highest tuition fees in the industry - between $45,000 to $85,000 in 2014 - and had the industry's highest rate of loans that went into default within two years of attendance.

In 2016, Chinese investors Zhifeng Zhang and Yude Zhang became ESI insiders, purchasing more than 3,000,000 shares of ITT Educational Services stock. In July 2016, ESI reported that enrollment was projected to drop by 30% to 40% from 2015 to 2016. In August 2016, the U.S. Department of Education barred the company from enrolling new students who use government loans. On the 30th of the same month, ITT Technical Institute stopped accepting applications for new enrollment. At that time, ITT Tech said that existing students could still finish their studies. ITT Tech also said that they would continue to operate until the last of its enrolled students either graduate or drop out. However, on September 6, 2016, ITT Technical Institute announced that it was shutting down all of its campuses, effective immediately.

At the time of its system-wide closure on September 6, 2016, the school had more than 130 ITT Technical Institute campuses across the United States, with more than 40,000 students and 8,000 employees. ITT Educational Services filed for Chapter 7 bankruptcy liquidation on September 16, 2016.

As for DWC, Southern New Hampshire University (SNHU), a nonprofit college in Manchester, New Hampshire, hired most of the college's faculty and staff. This arrangement allowed the 2016–17 academic year to proceed as usual. DWC's aviation and engineering programs were effectively transferred into SNHU, which had offered to buy the Nashua campus. However, its bid got rejected, and SNHU instead opted to build a new on-campus science and engineering building.

== Student loan debt and debt relief ==
In 2014, Time magazine ranked ITT Technical Institute No. 2 on its list of "The 5 Colleges That Leave the Most Students Crippled By Debt". Among ITT Tech graduates with loans due in 2011, 22% had defaulted by 2014. This statistic compares with a default rate of about 13.7% for student loans generally. According to the Time magazine report, ITT Tech's default rate ranked second. The for-profit University of Phoenix had a lower default rate by percentage (19% at Phoenix versus ITT Tech's 22%). However, the total number of students in default from Phoenix was much higher (45,123 Phoenix students versus 11,260 ITT Tech students).

According to the College Scorecard, as of March 2016, 39% of ITT Tech graduates were paying off their debt, compared to the national average of 66% among all U.S. schools. This percentage represented the number of graduates able to repay at least $1 in student loan debt in the three years after their graduation.

In 2018, a settlement to a class-action lawsuit was tentatively reached to wipe out student loans for attendees from 2006 to 2016. Students who attended ITT Tech may be able to have their debt forgiven by applying to the United States Department of Education for borrower defense to repayment. However, Secretary of Education Betsy DeVos announced on July 25, 2018, that the borrower defense rule would be rewritten and replaced with a stricter repayment policy starting July 1, 2019. On December 13, 2018, a US federal court ruled that the department's decision to do this was "arbitrary and capricious." The court sided with plaintiffs in invalidating the stay put in place by the Department of Education. There will be an additional hearing on December 14, 2018, to "address remedies."

In June 2019, Student CU Connect CUSO, a private lender for ITT Tech, settled with the Consumer Financial Protection Bureau and 44 states and the District of Columbia. The settlement called for CUSO to forgive a reported $168 million in private student loans. CUSO agreed to stop collecting on, and discharge, all of the loans.

== Academics ==
The school characterized ITT Tech students as "older and balancing family obligations with underemployment." The company's web site stated: "The programs employ traditional, applied and adult-learning pedagogies and are delivered through traditional, accelerated and distance methodologies in a learner-centered environment of mutual respect."

ITT Tech offered associate, bachelor's, and master's (business-only, online) degrees. The commonwealth of Pennsylvania was the only state which forbade ITT Tech to offer master's degrees. As of December 31, 2015, the ITT Technical Institutes were offering 49 education programs in various fields of study.

At the vast majority of campuses, ITT Tech organized the academic schedules based on four 12-week academic quarters in a calendar year, with new students beginning at the start of each academic quarter. Using that calendar, students taking a full course load could complete associate degree programs in seven or eight academic quarters, bachelor's degree programs in 14 or 15 academic quarters, or a master's degree program in seventeen academic quarters.

Depending on student enrollment, class sessions at ITT Technical Institute campuses were generally available during the day and evening. The courses for education programs taught online were delivered through an asynchronous learning network and had a prescribed schedule for completion of the coursework. At the vast majority of ITT Technical Institute campuses, the class schedule for education program residence courses and the coursework completion schedule for online courses generally provided students with the flexibility to maintain employment concurrently with their studies. Student surveys indicated that a majority of ITT Technical Institute students worked at least part-time during their programs. A significant portion of classes involved practical study in a lab environment.

=== Accreditation ===
ITT Tech was nationally accredited by the Accrediting Council for Independent Colleges and Schools (ACICS). According to ITT Educational Services' annual report for the fiscal year 2015, 31 campuses and more than 400 programs were not meeting ACICS standards for student retention. Per the ITT Tech web site, "it is unlikely that any credits earned at an ITT Technical Institute will be transferable to or accepted by any institution other than an ITT Technical Institute." In April 2016, ACICS issued the company a "show cause" order to request information establishing why the accreditor should continue to accredit the institution. This order was in response to its programs being non-compliant with specific standards.

=== Rankings ===
In 2015, financial news site TheStreet.com ranked ITT Technical Institute-Seattle on a list of "10 Best U.S. Two-Year Colleges That Actually Pay Off." According to TheStreet.com, ITT's Seattle campus ranked fourth in terms of alumni reporting rewarding careers, only after its sister ITT Technical Institute schools in San Antonio, West Houston, and San Diego.

== Legal issues ==
In September 1998, ITT Tech agreed to settle eight legal proceedings involving 40 former students arising out of their recruitment and education practices at ITT Tech campuses. The settlements cost $12.9 million, which included legal fees.

In Daniel Graves filed a whistleblower lawsuit against ITT Tech after a short stint working for the company, alleging compensation for some ITT staff violated the Higher Education Act of 1965 by incentivizing recruiters based on the number of students they enrolled with the school. The case alleged a culture of corruption at ITT, and was litigated for about 17 years until ITT prevailed when the US Supreme Court refused to hear an appeal of earlier rulings that the case was dismissed for failure to state a claim.

In 2004, federal agents served search warrants at the company's headquarters and ten of its campuses in Indiana, Texas, Virginia, Florida, Louisiana, Nevada, California, and Oregon, seeking various student records. No civil or criminal charges were made at this time. The investigation negatively affected the company's stock and triggered several class-action lawsuits by investors. The same year, the Office of the Attorney General for the State of California (CAG) investigated ITT Technical Institutes in California. The CAG's investigation was in response to qui tam actions filed against the company under either state, federal, or both False Claims Acts. (Qui tam actions are writs through which private individuals who assist a prosecution can receive part or all of the damages or financial penalties recovered by the government as a result of the prosecution). The probe alleged that ITT Tech falsified records relating to student attendance, grades, and academic progress. It also said that ITT Tech falsified student grade point average calculations used to qualify students for financial aid under the State's Cal Grant Program and retaliated against employees who may have complained about those alleged acts. Omer Waddles, ESI's CEO, and a former counsel for Edward Kennedy, also resigned.

In October 2005, ITT agreed to pay $730,000 to settle a lawsuit with California. The involved employees alleged that it inflated students' grade point averages to qualify them for more financial aid from the State of California.

A February 2011 investigative report by WTMJ-TV in Milwaukee found evidence of widespread grade inflation at the school's Milwaukee area location in Greenfield. In one instance a student received a score of 100% on a computer forensics assignment by emailing the professor a noodle recipe. The station's reporters believed tactics such as these increased federal student aid funding.

In 2013, a complaint was filed against ESI and two ESI executive officers in U.S. District Court for the Southern District of New York regarding securities. The Massachusetts Laborers' Annuity Fund filed a similar complaint and the cases were consolidated. The Plumbers and Pipefitters National Pension Fund and Metropolitan Water Reclamation District Retirement Fund were the lead plaintiffs. Students continue to allege that private loans with JP Morgan Chase and other banks are predatory loans. In 2013 USA Today listed more than 50 ITT campuses as "red flag" schools because their student loan default rates were higher than their graduation rates.

On February 26, 2014, the Consumer Financial Protection Bureau (CFPB) sued ITT. The CFPB alleged ITT used high-pressure tactics to coerce students into obtaining high-interest private loans that were likely to end in default. ESI is also being investigated by at least a dozen state attorneys general for allegations of fraud and deceptive marketing. According to a July 2014 Senate Health, Education, Labor, and Pensions (HELP) committee report, 57% of ITT programs would fail the Department of Education's proposed Gainful Employment rule.

On October 19, 2015, the US Department of Education announced that because of the company's failure "to meet its fiduciary obligations" it was placed under additional scrutiny.

In a 2015 federal whistleblower lawsuit, former ITT employee Rodney Lipscomb alleged the company used coercive tactics to enroll students who were unlikely to pass classes at the school; unlawfully paid sales commissions to recruiters; and lied to students about their financial obligations and transferability of ITT credits to other schools and career prospects. The same year, The California Department of Veterans Affairs (CalVet) temporarily ordered ITT Tech to stop enrolling new or returning students who fund their educations with GI Bill benefits. In 2015, the Securities and Exchange Commission also announced fraud charges against ITT Educational Services Inc., its chief executive officer Kevin Modany, and its chief financial officer Daniel Fitzpatrick.

In 2016, Massachusetts Attorney General Maura Healey sued ITT Educational Services for allegedly "misleading and harassing students." Breckinridge nurses also sued ITT Education for fraud. Between 2004 and 2014, several states issued subpoenas or Civil Investigative Demands against ITT Tech under the authority of their consumer protection statutes: Arkansas, Arizona, Colorado, Connecticut, District of Columbia, Hawaii, Idaho, Iowa, Kentucky, Maryland, Massachusetts, Minnesota, Missouri, Nebraska, North Carolina, Oregon, Pennsylvania, Tennessee and Washington.

On August 25, 2016, the U.S. Department of Education banned ITT Tech from enrolling students who receive federal aid. The department also doubled the surety funds that ITT Tech was required to have, and to produce those funds within 30 days. ITT stock soon dropped by 35% which triggered a halt in trading and raised concerns about whether ITT Educational would be able to survive this latest decision.

On September 6, 2016, ITT Tech ceased operations and closed all of its locations, issuing a statement that attributed the closing to the Department of Education's actions.

In 2022, ITT Technical Institute was one of 153 institutions included in student loan cancellation due to alleged fraud. The class action was brought by a group of more than 200,000 student borrowers, assisted by the Project on Predatory Student Lending, part of the Legal Services Center of Harvard Law School. A settlement was approved in August 2022, stating that the schools on the list were included "substantial misconduct by the listed schools, whether credibly alleged or in some instances proven." In April 2023, the Supreme Court rejected a challenge to the settlement and allowed to proceed the debt cancellation due to alleged fraud.

== Notable alumni ==
- Curt Cobb, former member of the Tennessee House of Representatives
- Jon Hensley, radio personality and talent manager
- Yvette Herrell, United States Representative for New Mexico's 2nd congressional district
- David Joyner, actor known for Barney & Friends
- Omar Navarro, perennial candidate and convicted felon
- Ricardo Raschini, Brazilian bobsledder who competed in the 2002 and 2006 Winter Olympics
- DJ Tab, hip hop DJ, record producer, and entrepreneur

== See also ==
- DeVry University
