= Clarence W. Phillips =

American lawyer and politician

Clarence Phillips

Member of the Tennessee House of Representatives from the 62nd district
- In office January 9, 1973 – January 14, 2003
- Preceded by: Constituency established
- Succeeded by: Curt Cobb

Personal details
- Born: Clarence Waters Phillips, Jr. February 1, 1925 Shelbyville, Tennessee, U.S.
- Died: December 12, 2012 (aged 87) Shelbyville, Tennessee, U.S.
- Party: Democratic
- Spouse: Faith Hall (m. 1947; died 2010)
- Children: 2
- Education: Vanderbilt University; Vanderbilt University Law School (JD)
- Occupation: Politician; lawyer
- Website: House website

Clarence Waters "Pete" Phillips, Jr. (February 1, 1925 – December 12, 2012) was an American lawyer and politician.

Born in Shelbyville, Tennessee, Phillips served in the United States Army during World War II. He then received his bachelor's degree from Vanderbilt University and his law degree from Vanderbilt University Law School. Phillips practiced law in Shelbyville, Tennessee. Phillips served in the Tennessee House of Representatives from 1973 to 2003 and was a Democrat. Phillips died in Shelbyville, Tennessee. His mother, Viola Phillips, was the first woman to serve as mayor of Loveland, Ohio, beginning in 1969.
