= World Harvest Church =

Church in Ohio, United States

Coordinates: 39.891454°N 82.828068°W

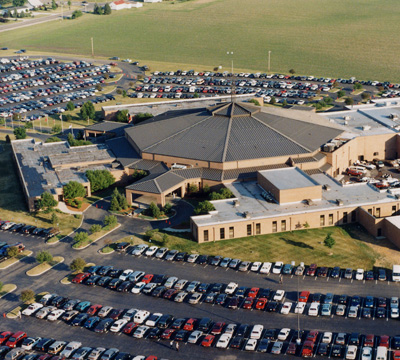
- Aerial view of World Harvest Church's Columbus, Ohio campus.
- World Harvest Church
- Location: Canal Winchester, Ohio; Elkhart, Indiana
- Country: United States
- Denomination: nondenominational evangelical
- Website: www.whc.life

History
- Founded: 1977 (49 years ago)
- Founder: Rod Parsley

Architecture
- Architect: Roe Messner
- Years built: 1985
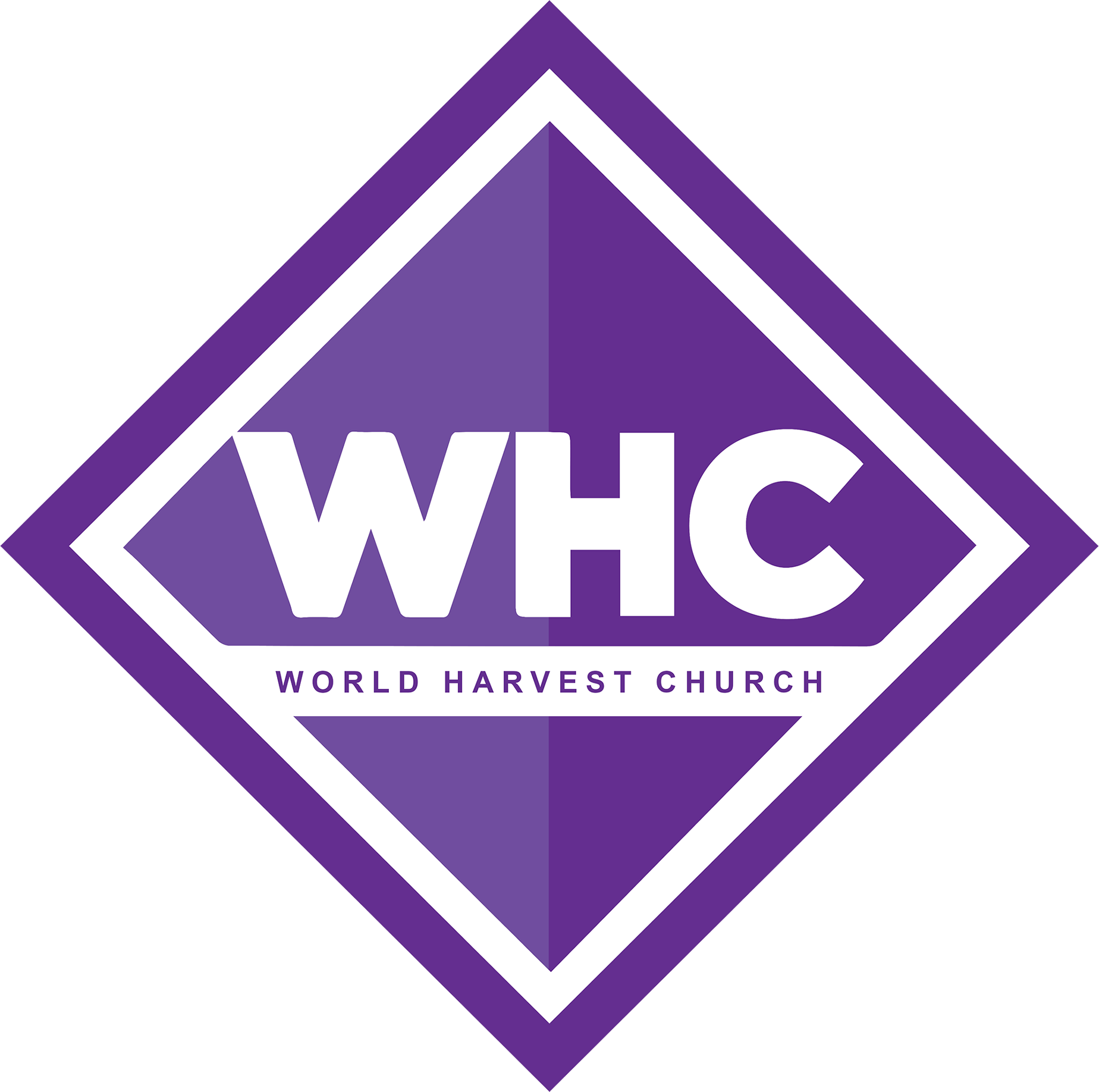

World Harvest Church is a nondenominational evangelical megachurch pastored by Rod Parsley, based in Columbus, Ohio.

== History ==
First started in 1977 in Rod Parsley's parents' backyard, the church consisted of 17 people. Two years later Parsley bought property for the church to be built on. 180 people were attending at this point. In 1982 the seating was doubled. The number of people was so large that a second Sunday morning service was added. This influenced Parsley to upgrade the church, and in 1984 1200 more seats were added. Now sitting on Gender Road in Columbus, Ohio, the church seats over 5,200 people and contains an auditorium, a television studio, a children's ministry that includes Sunday school for children newborn to 6th grade, Harvest Preparatory School, and administrative offices. The church sits on 57 acres (230,000 m^{2}) and is 122,000 square feet (11,300 m^{2}). It was built by Roe Messner. Parsley's Breakthrough television program is taped at the church. Breakthrough is a program put on by the church.

The church also incorporates Valor Christian College, a young, co-educational institution located outside Columbus. It used to be three miles from the church, but now sits on the same property where World Harvest Church is located.

== Breakthrough ==
Breakthrough is the television ministry of World Harvest Church. It airs twice a day, six days a week, and is available in 97 percent of the United States and in most other nations. The show features Parsley's sermons as well as interviews with guests, often in front of a studio audience. The programs are produced from a studio on the church's Columbus campus that was formally dedicated in August 2008.

Breakthrough is carried on 1,400 stations and cable affiliates, including Daystar Television Network and Trinity Broadcasting Network. The broadcast is also available internationally on the HotBird6 and Thaicom 3 satellites.

== Valor Christian College ==
Valor Christian College is a Bible school and general studies college associated with the World Harvest Church located in Columbus, Ohio, on property originally built by World Harvest Church. This college is accredited with the Association for Biblical Higher Education and authorized by the Ohio State Board of Career Colleges and Schools to offer Associate of Applied Science degrees and diplomas in Bible and ministry-related studies.

== Controversies ==
A group of churches and synagogues from Columbus requested that the IRS perform an inquiry about the church's political activities. The group accused the church of illegally campaigning on the behalf of former Ohio Gubernatorial candidate Ken Blackwell. The IRS does not comment publicly on potential or ongoing investigations, therefore it is not known if anything came of the request.

A family noticed injuries on their 2-year-old son after attending the on site daycare at the church in January 2006. They believed he was struck with a ruler while under the care of a teacher in the employ of the church. When the parents brought the injuries to the attention of the church, they were banned from the property and threatened with criminal trespassing charges if they ever returned.

The Church and the teacher were found liable in a lawsuit brought by the parents of the 2 year old child for causing injury while spanking the child. The jury awarded the family US$5 million in punitive damages, and US$999,100 in compensatory damages, reduced at appeal: "On May 23, 2008, the trial court entered a final judgment of $2,871,431.87 in favor of plaintiffs. WHC is solely liable for $2,789,066.87 of the judgment; Vaughan is primarily liable, and WHC secondarily liable, for the remaining $82,365 in compensatory damages entered against Vaughan."

The Church then sued their insurer, Grange Mutual Casualty Co. In May 2016 the Ohio Supreme Court ruled that their insurance policy did not cover the damages as the policy contained an abuse and molestation exclusion.

In 2016 Joni Parsley, the wife of Rod Parsley, was charged with voter fraud for illegally signing mail-in ballots between 2009 and 2014. Parsley was initially sentenced to 10 days in jail, which was later reduced to a $250 fine and one year of probation.
