= DJ Tab =

American musical artist (born 1987)

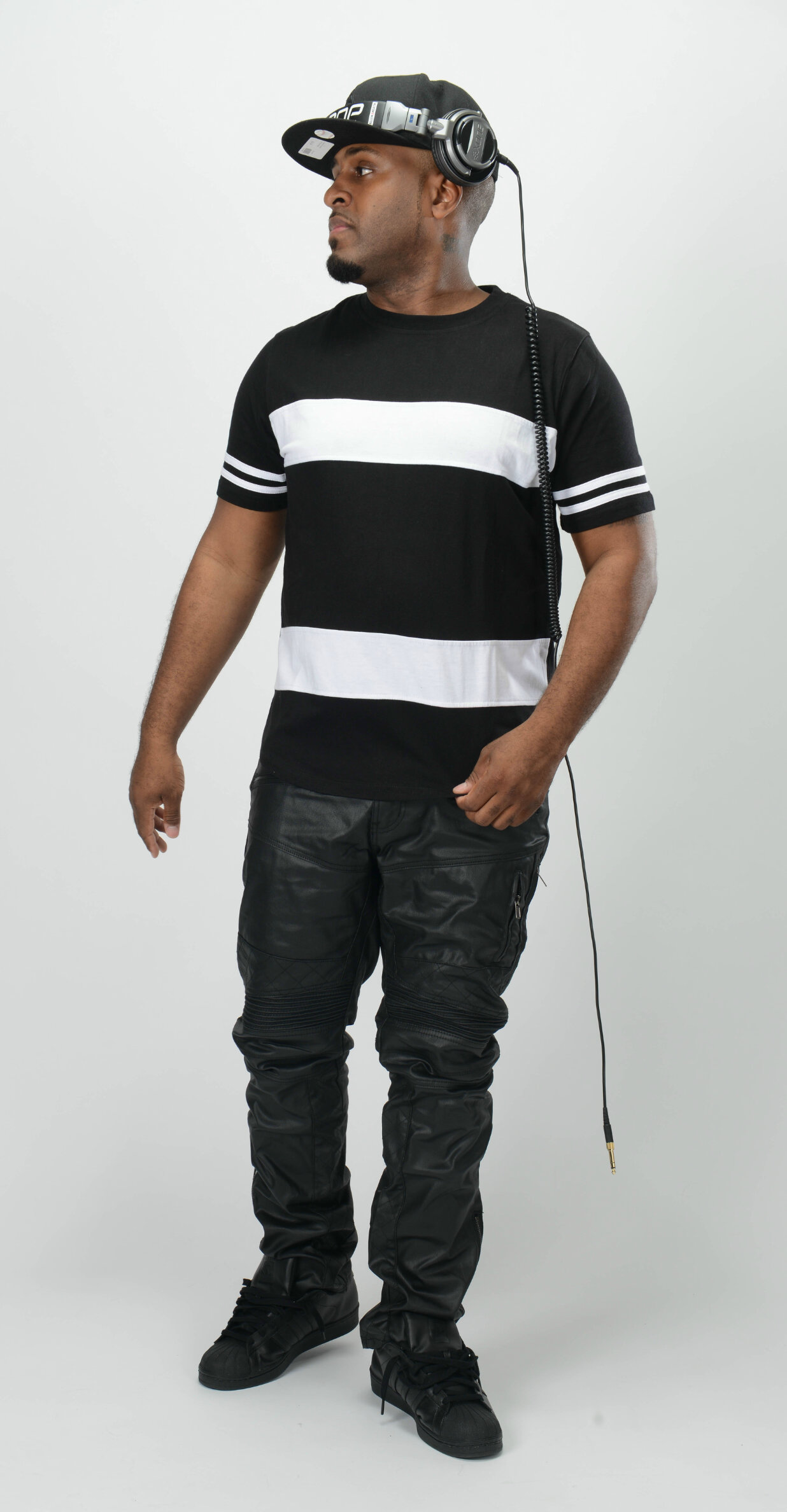
- Dj Tab in 2016
- Born: Trumaine Barnett-Epps; September 19, 1987 (age 39); St. Louis, Missouri, U.S
- Education: ITT Technical Institute
- Occupations: Disc jockey; entrepreneur; record producer
- Musical career
- Genres: Hip hop; R&B; house; EDM
- Instruments: Turntables, sampler
- Years active: 1999–present
- Labels: So So Def; Artista; Iconic Music Group; Geffen; Interscope
- Website: djtab.com

Trumaine Barnett-Epps (born September 19, 1987), professionally known as DJ Tab, is an American hip hop DJ, record producer and entrepreneur. He has worked with DJ Khaled, Chris Brown, Bow Wow and J-Kwon. In 2015, he was nominated in the Midwest Regional Club DJ of the Year at the 4th edition of the annual Global Spin Awards. He is presently the owner of Streetz 105.1, and his is currently a radio personality on Sirius XM Shade 45 on Sunday nights.

== Early life and career ==
Born on September 19, 1987 in St. Louis, Missouri, U.S., DJ Tab started DJing at the age of 11 after he was introduced to the profession while watching local DJs around Saint Louis at local skating rinks and teen nightclubs. An alumnus of the ITT Technical Institute where he received a bachelor's degree in Criminal Justice, DJ Tab's big break came in his sophomore year of high school when a local female promoter booked him and J-Kwon for a high school Christmas concert. During sound check, J-Kwon's show disc malfunctioned and Tab ended up running J-Kwon sound check using the vinyl record of J-Kwon hit 2003 single "Tipsy", a song which went on to peak at number 2 on the Billboard Hot 100.

DJ Tab and J-Kwon later made appearances on multiple television shows including BET Rap City, Showtime at the Apollo and MTV's Total Request Live amongst others. In 2015, DJ Tab launched Empire Clothing, a men's online clothing store before he went on to launch his own energy drink called Get-N-Tune in 2016.

== Discography ==
List of singles as lead artist, showing year released and album name
Title	Year	Album
"We Don't Love 'Em (Remix)" (featuring Stuey Rock, Juney Boomdata & Saint Orleans)	2011	Singles
"Luv Wit 2" (featuring Jordan)	2011	Singles
"Dance" (featuring G tha Singer)	2013	Singles
"Breakdown"	2015	Singles
"Jelly" (featuring Kstylis)	2017	Singles
"I Ain't Scared" (featuring Baby Soda & Doe F.a.m)	2020	

=== Mixtapes ===
List of mixtapes, with selected details
Title	Album details
GET-N-TUNE	Artist: DJ Tab; Released: 2013; Label: Team Tab; Formats: Digital download
Street Smartz	Artist: Stackz; Released: 2013; Label: Street Money Mafia; Formats: Digital download
March 20th	Artist: Various artists; Released: 2014; Label: Team Tab; Formats: Digital download
I Am King B	Artist: King B; Released: 2015; Label: Insain Music Group; Formats: Digital download
Already On	Artist: Tana & Trie; Released: 2016; Label: Amp Nation; Formats: Digital download
Keep It G	Artist: Stan G; Released: 2016; Label: Indy; Formats: Digital download

== Awards and nominations ==
In April 2016, DJ Tab was honoured and listed on Deluxe Magazine's "Emerging30", a list of 30 under-30 individuals who have redefined their respective fields. In 2018, he was recognized at the 2018 Stifel Bank & Trust Black Tie Community Award where he was the Arts & Entertainment Recipient winner.

Year	Award ceremony	Prize	Recipient	Result	Ref
2015	4th Global Spin Awards	Regional Club DJ of the Year (Midwest)	Himself	Nominated	
2017	Power 100 Awards	Communications & Entertainment Recipient	Himself	Won	
