= Curt Cobb =

American politician (born 1971)

Member of the Tennessee House of Representatives from the 62nd district
- In office January 14, 2003 – June 30, 2009
- Preceded by: Clarence W. Phillips
- Succeeded by: Pat Marsh

Personal details
- Born: December 28, 1971 (age 54)
- Party: Independent (from 2026) Democratic (until 2026)
- Spouse(s): Margaret Anne Cobb (divorced), Loren Sanderson
- Children: 3
- Education: ITT Technical Institute (AAS)
- Website: House website

Curt Cobb (born December 28, 1971) is an American politician currently serving as the mayor of Bedford County, Tennessee. He previously served as a Democratic member of the Tennessee House of Representatives for the 62nd district, which encompasses Bedford County and parts of Lincoln County and Rutherford County. Curt Cobb began his service in the 103rd Tennessee General Assembly.

Curt Cobb was a member of the House Commerce Committee, the House Health and Human Resources Committee, and the Joint Business Tax Committee. He also served as chair of the House Small Business Subcommittee. In addition, he was a member of the Shelbyville Zoning Commission.

Curt Cobb operated Cobb Realty and Auction, LLC, until it merged into Rowland & Cobb Realtors. He works as both a real estate broker and auctioneer. He graduated from Shelbyville Central High School. He obtained his Associate of Applied Science degree in Electronic Engineering Technology from ITT Technical Institute.

In 2009, Cobb resigned from his House seat, in his fourth term, to serve as Bedford County Clerk and Master (court clerk).

In 2026, Cobb was elected mayor of Bedford County as an independent.
