= Valor Christian College =

Bible college in Columbus, Ohio, US

- Former names: World Harvest Bible Institute, World Harvest Bible College
- Motto: "The School of Revival!"
- Type: Private Bible College
- Established: 1990
- Religious affiliation: World Harvest Church
- President: Dr. Scott Camp
- Location: Columbus, Ohio, United States; 39°53′26″N 82°49′49″W
- Campus: Suburban
- Colors: Maroon and white
- Nickname: Warriors
- Website: www.valorcollege.edu

Valor Christian College is a private Bible college associated with World Harvest Church and located in Columbus, Ohio, United States. It is accredited by the Commission on Accreditation of the Association for Biblical Higher Education to grant certificates and degrees at the bachelor and associate degree levels. It is also authorized by the Ohio Department of Higher Education to offer Bachelor of Arts and associate of applied science degrees and diplomas in Bible and ministry-related studies.

== History ==
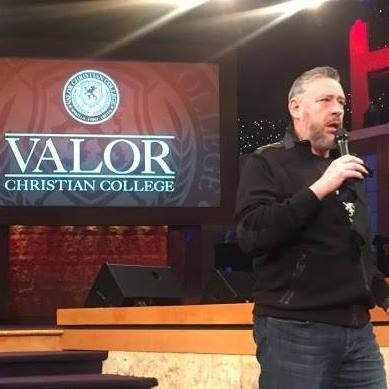
Rod Parsley, founder and chancellor of Valor Christian College, addresses a chapel service.

The college was founded in 1990 by Rodney Lee Parsley, pastor of World Harvest Church, as World Harvest Bible Institute.

New programs were added in the following years and in 1993, the name was changed to World Harvest Bible College.

In the fall of 2009, the college was approved by the state of Ohio to offer Associate of Applied Science degrees. The college changed its name to Valor Christian College in January 2010.

Beginning with the fall semester of 2012, Valor's academic building moved from a campus on Wright Road in Canal Winchester, Ohio, to the World Harvest Church campus.

Classes are held in Canfield Hall, a building that formerly housed administrative offices for World Harvest Church. It is named after the church's senior elder, Bill Canfield, and is adjacent to the men's and women's dormitories.

Students who attend Valor are eligible for work-study programs.

== Academics ==
Valor Christian College academic programs place a strong concentration biblical foundations and tools to use in ministry activities through classroom study and hands-on experiences in a variety of ministry areas. The college offers one-year diploma programs and two-year associate degree programs. Degree programs also are available online.

The college is accredited by the Association for Biblical Higher Education. It is also authorized by the Ohio Department of Higher Education to offer Bachelor of Arts and associate of applied science degrees and diplomas in Bible and ministry-related studies.
