= Brown's Ferry, Tennessee =

Ferry crossing point over the Tennessee River near Chattanooga, Tennessee

Coordinates: 35.05619°N 85.34496°W

Brown's Ferry, Tennessee is an historical crossing point over the Tennessee River between Lookout Valley and Moccasin Bend in the city of Chattanooga, Tennessee. It was the site of the Battle of Brown's Ferry during the American Civil War. The ferry crossing was a key to the Cracker Line which became a reliable supply route for the Union Army in Chattanooga.

It was included into the city of Chattanooga in an annexation in 1972.
