= Curtis Johnson (politician) =

American politician (born 1952)

Deputy Speaker of the Tennessee House of Representatives
- In office January 8, 2019 – January 14, 2025
- Preceded by: Janice Bowling
- Succeeded by: Jason Zachary

Speaker pro tempore of the Tennessee House of Representatives
- In office January 8, 2013 – January 8, 2019
- Preceded by: Judd Matheny
- Succeeded by: Bill Dunn

Member of the Tennessee House of Representatives from the 68th district
- In office January 2005 – January 14, 2025
- Preceded by: Tommy Head
- Succeeded by: Aron Maberry

Mayor Pro Tem of Clarksville
- In office 1996–1997

Member of the Clarksville City Council
- In office 1994–2002

Personal details
- Born: September 29, 1952 (age 74)
- Party: Republican
- Education: Austin Peay State University (BBA)

Curtis G. Johnson (born September 29, 1952) is an American politician and a Republican member of the Tennessee House of Representatives represented District 68 from 2005-2025.

In 2023, Johnson supported a resolution to expel three Democratic lawmakers from the legislature for violating decorum rules.

== Education ==
Johnson earned his BBA from Austin Peay State University.

== Elections ==
In 2004, to challenge District 68 incumbent Democratic Representative Tommy Head, Johnson ran in the August 5, 2004 Republican Primary, winning with 1,104 votes (77.9%), and won the November 2, 2004 General election with 13,044 votes (55.3%) against Representative Head.

In 2006 Johnson was unopposed for the August 3, 2006 Republican Primary, winning with 4,118 votes, and won the November 7, 2006 General election with 10,158 votes (55.5%) against Democratic nominee Tim Barnes.

In 2008 Johnson was unopposed for both the August 7, 2008 Republican Primary, winning with 1,471 votes, and the November 4, 2008 General election, winning with 18,177 votes.

In 2010 Johnson was unopposed for the August 5, 2010 Republican Primary, winning with 5,545 votes, and won the November 2, 2010 General election with 10,804 votes (64.7%) against Democratic nominee Brett Ramsey.

In 2012 Johnson was unopposed for both the August 2, 2012 Republican Primary, winning with 2,253 votes, and the November 6, 2012 General election, winning with 18,376 votes.

Tennessee House of Representatives
Preceded by Judd Matheny	Speaker pro tempore of the Tennessee House of Representatives; 2013–2019	Succeeded by Bill Dunn
