= Moccasin Bend Mental Health Institute =

Coordinates: 35.0257°N 85.3355°W

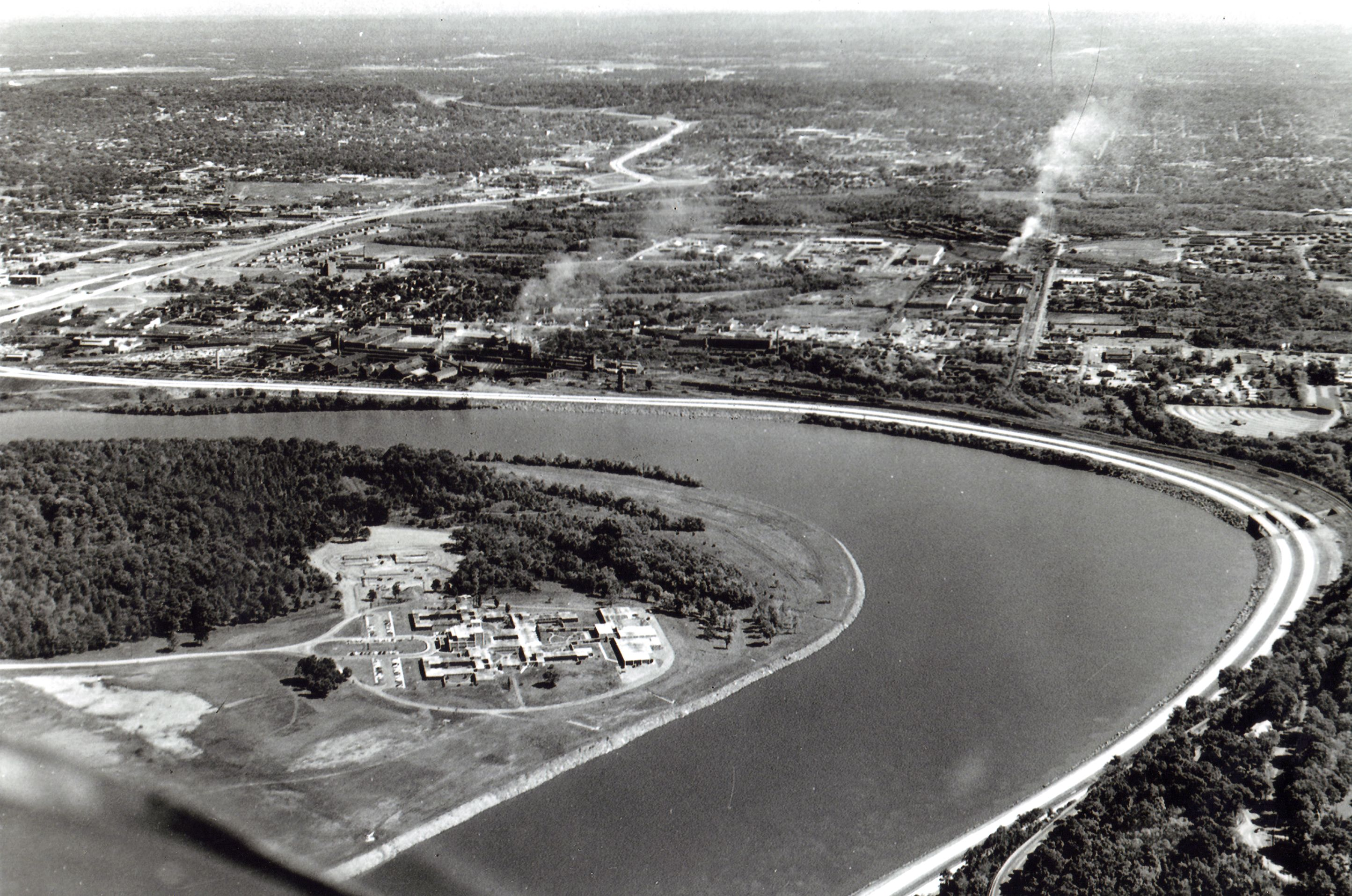
Aerial view of the Moccasin Bend, hospital can be seen in the lower left. (1967)

Moccasin Bend is the site of the Moccasin Bend Mental Health Institute. It is located on a private area of land on the Tennessee River. It was founded in 1961 by the Tennessee State Legislature. "Moccasin Bend Mental Health Institute is a psychiatric hospital in Chattanooga, Tennessee, with 150 beds. Survey data for the latest year available shows that the hospital had a total of 2,340 admissions.". The hospital was built into five different buildings. The first building was built in 1961. "A local architect, Mario Bianculli, designed the majority of the buildings at the Moccasin Bend Mental Health Institute. Considered "Chattanooga's First Modernist," Bianculli was a pioneer of modern architecture in Tennessee and the southeastern United States." The hospital specializes in psychiatric care.
