= 2006 Tennessee House of Representatives election =

- November 7, 2006

99 Seats in the Tennessee House of Representatives 50 seats needed for a majority
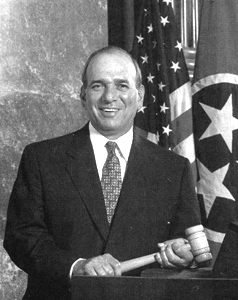

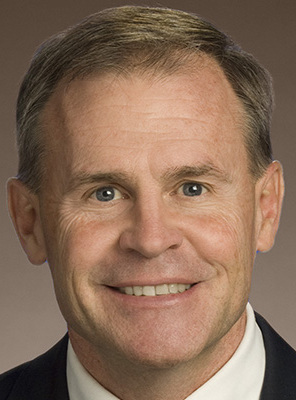
	Majority party	Minority party
Leader	Jimmy Naifeh	Bill Dunn
Party	Democratic	Republican
Leader's seat	81st: Covington	16th: Knoxville
Last election	53	46
Seats won	53	46
Seat change	Steady	Steady
Popular vote	769,771	747,409
Percentage	49.87%	48.42%
- Results: Democratic hold Republican hold Results by vote share: 50–60% 60–70% 70–80% 80–90% >90% 50–60% 60–70% 70–80% >90%
Speaker of the House before election
Jimmy Naifeh
Democratic
Elected Speaker of the House
Jimmy Naifeh
Democratic

The 2006 Tennessee House of Representatives election was held on November 7, 2006, to elect 99 seats for the Tennessee House of Representatives. The elections coincided with the Governor, U.S. Senate, U.S. House, and State Senate elections. The primary elections were held on August 3, 2006.

Neither party gained seats in this election, keeping the number of seats in the House the same as in the last election, and resulting in the Democrats retaining their majority.

As of 2026, this election was the last election where the Tennessee Democratic Party held their majority in the House, along with being Jimmy Naifeh's final two years as Speaker. This was also the last time Democrats won the popular vote. Since 2008, Republicans have held a majority that would later turn into a supermajority government prior to the 2012 election.

== Predictions ==
Source	Ranking	As of
Rothenberg	Lean D	November 4, 2006

== Results summary ==
Summary of the November 7, 2006 Tennessee House election results
Party	Candidates	Votes		Seats	
Party	Candidates	No.	%	No.	+/–
Democratic	72	769,771	49.87%	53	Steady
Republican	68	747,409	48.42%	46	Steady
Independent	15	26,305	1.70%	0	Steady
Write-in		25	0.00%	0	Steady
Total		1,543,510	100.00%	99	Steady

Popular vote
Democratic	49.87%
Republican	48.42%
Independent	1.70%
Write-ins	0.00%

House seats
Democratic	53.54%
Republican	46.46%

=== Close races ===
Seven races were decided by a margin of under 10%:

District	Winner	Party	Margin	Raw Vote Difference
7	Matthew Hill	Republican	4.6%	725
11	Eddie Yokley	Democratic	9.4%	1,614
47	Judd Matheny	Republican	5.1%	839
64	Tom DuBois	Republican	7.0%	1,382
66	Robert Bibb	Democratic	1.0%	169
67	Joe Pitts	Democratic	8.0%	988
78	Phillip Johnson	Republican	4.9%	845

== District 1 ==
2006 Tennessee House of Representatives District 1 Republican Primary
Party	Candidate	Votes	%
Republican	Jon Lundberg	1,793	50.3%
Republican	John K. Crawford	1,771	49.7%
Total votes		3,564	100.0%

2006 Tennessee House of Representatives District 1 Democratic Primary
Party	Candidate	Votes	%
Democratic	Kevin B. Smith	1,185	100.0%
Total votes		1,185	100.0%

2006 Tennessee House of Representatives District 1 Election
Party	Candidate	Votes	%
Republican	Jon Lundberg	8,720	61.2%
Democratic	Kevin B. Smith	5,087	35.7%
Independent	Jerry G. Dykes	294	2.1%
Independent	John Robert Harrison	145	1.0%
Total votes		14,246	100.0%

== District 2 ==
2006 Tennessee House of Representatives District 2 Republican Primary
Party	Candidate	Votes	%
Republican	No Candidate Filed	0	0.0%
Total votes		0	100.0%

2006 Tennessee House of Representatives District 2 Democratic Primary
Party	Candidate	Votes	%
Democratic	Nathan Vaughn	1,823	100.0%
Total votes		1,823	100.0%

2006 Tennessee House of Representatives District 2 Election
Party	Candidate	Votes	%
Democratic	Nathan Vaughn	14,528	100.0%
Total votes		14,528	100.0%

== District 3 ==
2006 Tennessee House of Representatives District 3 Republican Primary
Party	Candidate	Votes	%
Republican	Jason E. Mumpower	5,222	100.0%
Total votes		5,222	100.0%

2006 Tennessee House of Representatives District 3 Democratic Primary
Party	Candidate	Votes	%
Democratic	No Candidate Filed	0	0.0%
Total votes		0	100.0%

2006 Tennessee House of Representatives District 3 Election
Party	Candidate	Votes	%
Republican	Jason E. Mumpower	13,523	100.0%
Total votes		13,523	100.0%

== District 4 ==
2006 Tennessee House of Representatives District 4 Republican Primary
Party	Candidate	Votes	%
Republican	Kent Williams	5,619	53.2%
Republican	Jerome Cochran	4,940	46.8%
Total votes		10,559	100.0%

2006 Tennessee House of Representatives District 4 Democratic Primary
Party	Candidate	Votes	%
Democratic	No Candidate Filed	0	0.0%
Total votes		0	100.0%

2006 Tennessee House of Representatives District 4 Election
Party	Candidate	Votes	%
Republican	Kent Williams	12,920	100.0%
Total votes		12,920	100.0%

== District 5 ==
2006 Tennessee House of Representatives District 5 Republican Primary
Party	Candidate	Votes	%
Republican	David B. Hawk	6,269	100.0%
Total votes		6,269	100.0%

2006 Tennessee House of Representatives District 5 Democratic Primary
Party	Candidate	Votes	%
Democratic	No Candidate Filed	0	0.0%
Total votes		0	100.0%

2006 Tennessee House of Representatives District 5 Election
Party	Candidate	Votes	%
Republican	David B. Hawk	12,348	100.0%
Total votes		12,348	100.0%

== District 6 ==
2006 Tennessee House of Representatives District 6 Republican Primary
Party	Candidate	Votes	%
Republican	Dale Ford	2,304	30.5%
Republican	Patti Jarrett	2,271	30.0%
Republican	Ethan Flynn	1,830	24.2%
Republican	Lee Sowers	599	7.9%
Republican	Joshua Arrowood	403	5.3%
Republican	Michael A. Malone	151	2.0%
Total votes		7,558	100.0%

2006 Tennessee House of Representatives District 6 Election
Party	Candidate	Votes	%
Republican	Dale Ford	14,176	100.0%
Total votes		14,176	100.0%

== District 7 ==
2006 Tennessee House of Representatives District 7 Republican Primary
Party	Candidate	Votes	%
Republican	Matthew Hill	4,340	100.0%
Total votes		4,340	100.0%

2006 Tennessee House of Representatives District 7 Democratic Primary
Party	Candidate	Votes	%
Democratic	Fred Phillips	1,253	100.0%
Total votes		1,253	100.0%

2006 Tennessee House of Representatives District 7 Election
Party	Candidate	Votes	%
Republican	Matthew Hill	8,181	52.3%
Democratic	Fred Phillips	7,456	47.7%
Total votes		15,637	100.0%

== District 8 ==
2006 Tennessee House of Representatives District 8 Republican Primary
Party	Candidate	Votes	%
Republican	Joe McCord	4,851	100.0%
Total votes		4,851	100.0%

2006 Tennessee House of Representatives District 8 Election
Party	Candidate	Votes	%
Republican	Joe McCord	14,235	100.0%
Total votes		14,235	100.0%

== District 9 ==
2006 Tennessee House of Representatives District 9 Republican Primary
Party	Candidate	Votes	%
Republican	Mike Harrison	4,197	53.1%
Republican	Ed Baird	1,915	24.2%
Republican	Bill Sharp	1,788	22.6%
Total votes		7,900	100.0%

2006 Tennessee House of Representatives District 9 Democratic Primary
Party	Candidate	Votes	%
Democratic	Lewis Hopkins, Jr.	1,632	100.0%
Total votes		1,632	100.0%

2006 Tennessee House of Representatives District 9 Election
Party	Candidate	Votes	%
Republican	Mike Harrison	9,493	66.4%
Democratic	Lewis Hopkins, Jr.	4,803	33.6%
Total votes		14,296	100.0%

== District 10 ==
2006 Tennessee House of Representatives District 10 Democratic Primary
Party	Candidate	Votes	%
Democratic	John Litz	2,236	100.0%
Total votes		2,236	100.0%

2006 Tennessee House of Representatives District 10 Election
Party	Candidate	Votes	%
Democratic	John Litz	12,677	100.0%
Total votes		12,677	100.0%

== District 11 ==
2006 Tennessee House of Representatives District 11 Republican Primary
Party	Candidate	Votes	%
Republican	Charlotte Leibrock	5,118	100.0%
Total votes		5,118	100.0%

2006 Tennessee House of Representatives District 11 Democratic Primary
Party	Candidate	Votes	%
Democratic	Eddie Yokley	1,933	100.0%
Total votes		1,933	100.0%

2006 Tennessee House of Representatives District 11 Election
Party	Candidate	Votes	%
Democratic	Eddie Yokley	9,418	54.7%
Republican	Charlotte Leibrock	7,804	45.3%
Total votes		17,222	100.0%

== District 12 ==
2006 Tennessee House of Representatives District 12 Republican Primary
Party	Candidate	Votes	%
Republican	Richard Montgomery	5,628	100.0%
Total votes		5,628	100.0%

2006 Tennessee House of Representatives District 12 Election
Party	Candidate	Votes	%
Republican	Richard Montgomery	12,340	100.0%
Total votes		12,340	100.0%

== District 13 ==
2006 Tennessee House of Representatives District 13 Republican Primary
Party	Candidate	Votes	%
Republican	J. Randall Parker	2,120	100.0%
Total votes		2,120	100.0%

2006 Tennessee House of Representatives District 13 Democratic Primary
Party	Candidate	Votes	%
Democratic	Harry Tindell	1,736	100.0%
Total votes		1,736	100.0%

2006 Tennessee House of Representatives District 13 Election
Party	Candidate	Votes	%
Democratic	Harry Tindell	8,455	62.0%
Republican	J. Randall Parker	5,192	38.0%
Total votes		13,647	100.0%

== District 14 ==
2006 Tennessee House of Representatives District 14 Republican Primary
Party	Candidate	Votes	%
Republican	Park M. (Parkey) Strader	6,645	100.0%
Total votes		6,645	100.0%

2006 Tennessee House of Representatives District 14 Election
Party	Candidate	Votes	%
Republican	Park M. (Parkey) Strader	21,097	100.0%
Total votes		21,097	100.0%

== District 15 ==
2006 Tennessee House of Representatives District 15 Democratic Primary
Party	Candidate	Votes	%
Democratic	Joe Armstrong	2,119	100.0%
Total votes		2,119	100.0%

2006 Tennessee House of Representatives District 15 Election
Party	Candidate	Votes	%
Democratic	Joe Armstrong	7,924	79.5%
Independent	Pete Drew	2,040	20.5%
Total votes		9,964	100.0%

== District 16 ==
2006 Tennessee House of Representatives District 16 Republican Primary
Party	Candidate	Votes	%
Republican	Bill Dunn	6,110	100.0%
Total votes		6,110	100.0%

2006 Tennessee House of Representatives District 16 Election
Party	Candidate	Votes	%
Republican	Bill Dunn	17,321	99.9%
Republican	Write-in - Bryan Moneyhun	21	0.1%
Total votes		17,342	100.0%

== District 17 ==
2006 Tennessee House of Representatives District 17 Republican Primary
Party	Candidate	Votes	%
Republican	Frank S. Niceley	4,539	66.3%
Republican	Jim Bletner	2,306	33.7%
Total votes		6,845	100.0%

2006 Tennessee House of Representatives District 17 Election
Party	Candidate	Votes	%
Republican	Frank S. Niceley	14,969	100.0%
Total votes		14,969	100.0%

== District 18 ==
2006 Tennessee House of Representatives District 18 Republican Primary
Party	Candidate	Votes	%
Republican	Stacey Campfield	3,772	70.1%
Republican	Gary Drinnen	1,330	24.7%
Republican	George Dodson	275	5.1%
Total votes		5,377	100.0%

2006 Tennessee House of Representatives District 18 Democratic Primary
Party	Candidate	Votes	%
Democratic	Schree Pettigrew	1,403	100.0%
Total votes		1,403	100.0%

2006 Tennessee House of Representatives District 18 Election
Party	Candidate	Votes	%
Republican	Stacey Campfield	10,366	53.8%
Democratic	Schree Pettigrew	8,250	42.8%
Independent	David Garrett Jr.	657	3.4%
Total votes		19,273	100.0%

== District 19 ==
2006 Tennessee House of Representatives District 19 Republican Primary
Party	Candidate	Votes	%
Republican	Harry Brooks	4,691	100.0%
Total votes		4,691	100.0%

2006 Tennessee House of Representatives District 19 Election
Party	Candidate	Votes	%
Republican	Harry Brooks	14,302	100.0%
Total votes		14,302	100.0%

== District 20 ==
2006 Tennessee House of Representatives District 20 Republican Primary
Party	Candidate	Votes	%
Republican	Doug Overbey	5,557	100.0%
Total votes		5,557	100.0%

2006 Tennessee House of Representatives District 20 Election
Party	Candidate	Votes	%
Republican	Doug Overbey	16,372	100.0%
Total votes		16,372	100.0%

== District 21 ==
2006 Tennessee House of Representatives District 21 Republican Primary
Party	Candidate	Votes	%
Republican	Jimmy Matlock	6,227	79.4%
Republican	Robert Joe Lee II	1,611	20.6%
Total votes		7,838	100.0%

2006 Tennessee House of Representatives District 21 Democratic Primary
Party	Candidate	Votes	%
Democratic	Ann Barker	2,982	100.0%
Total votes		2,982	100.0%

2006 Tennessee House of Representatives District 21 Election
Party	Candidate	Votes	%
Republican	Jimmy Matlock	14,108	60.5%
Democratic	Ann Barker	9,202	39.5%
Total votes		23,310	100.0%

== District 22 ==
2006 Tennessee House of Representatives District 22 Republican Primary
Party	Candidate	Votes	%
Republican	Eric Watson	5,532	100.0%
Total votes		5,532	100.0%

2006 Tennessee House of Representatives District 22 Democratic Primary
Party	Candidate	Votes	%
Democratic	Casey Stokes	2,658	100.0%
Total votes		2,658	100.0%

2006 Tennessee House of Representatives District 22 Election
Party	Candidate	Votes	%
Republican	Eric Watson	11,670	64.8%
Democratic	Casey Stokes	6,325	35.2%
Total votes		17,995	100.0%

== District 23 ==
2006 Tennessee House of Representatives District 23 Republican Primary
Party	Candidate	Votes	%
Republican	Mike Bell	4,136	56.8%
Republican	Bob McKee	3,147	43.2%
Total votes		7,283	100.0%

2006 Tennessee House of Representatives District 23 Election
Party	Candidate	Votes	%
Republican	Mike Bell	13,384	100.0%
Total votes		13,384	100.0%

== District 24 ==
2006 Tennessee House of Representatives District 24 Republican Primary
Party	Candidate	Votes	%
Republican	Kevin D. Brooks	2,886	36.7%
Republican	Garry D. Moore	1,676	21.3%
Republican	Hal Roe	1,144	14.6%
Republican	Michael K. Willis	1,022	13.0%
Republican	Greg Cain	630	8.0%
Total votes		7,858	100.0%

2006 Tennessee House of Representatives District 24 Election
Party	Candidate	Votes	%
Republican	Kevin D. Brooks	12,151	100.0%
Total votes		12,151	100.0%

== District 25 ==
2006 Tennessee House of Representatives District 25 Republican Primary
Party	Candidate	Votes	%
Republican	Eric Swafford	7,074	100.0%
Total votes		7,074	100.0%

2006 Tennessee House of Representatives District 25 Democratic Primary
Party	Candidate	Votes	%
Democratic	Robert Safdie	4,623	100.0%
Total votes		4,623	100.0%

2006 Tennessee House of Representatives District 25 Election
Party	Candidate	Votes	%
Republican	Eric Swafford	13,671	59.7%
Democratic	Robert Safdie	9,240	40.3%
Total votes		22,911	100.0%

== District 26 ==
2006 Tennessee House of Representatives District 26 Republican Primary
Party	Candidate	Votes	%
Republican	Gerald McCormick	4,762	100.0%
Total votes		4,762	100.0%

2006 Tennessee House of Representatives District 26 Election
Party	Candidate	Votes	%
Republican	Gerald McCormick	15,856	100.0%
Total votes		15,856	100.0%

== District 27 ==
2006 Tennessee House of Representatives District 27 Republican Primary
Party	Candidate	Votes	%
Republican	Richard Floyd	4,387	63.7%
Republican	Howard D. Cotter	2,501	36.3%
Total votes		6,888	100.0%

2006 Tennessee House of Representatives District 27 Democratic Primary
Party	Candidate	Votes	%
Democratic	Bill Lusk	2,326	100.0%
Total votes		2,326	100.0%

2006 Tennessee House of Representatives District 27 Election
Party	Candidate	Votes	%
Republican	Richard Floyd	12,491	56.1%
Democratic	Bill Lusk	9,763	43.9%
Total votes		22,254	100.0%

== District 28 ==
2006 Tennessee House of Representatives District 28 Democratic Primary
Party	Candidate	Votes	%
Democratic	Tommie F. Brown	3,850	100.0%
Total votes		3,850	100.0%

2006 Tennessee House of Representatives District 28 Election
Party	Candidate	Votes	%
Democratic	Tommie F. Brown	10,308	80.5%
Independent	Isaac (Ike) Robinson	2,497	19.5%
Total votes		12,805	100.0%

== District 29 ==
2006 Tennessee House of Representatives District 29 Democratic Primary
Party	Candidate	Votes	%
Democratic	JoAnne Favors	4,029	100.0%
Total votes		4,029	100.0%

2006 Tennessee House of Representatives District 29 Election
Party	Candidate	Votes	%
Democratic	JoAnne Favors	12,821	100.0%
Total votes		12,821	100.0%

== District 30 ==
2006 Tennessee House of Representatives District 30 Republican Primary
Party	Candidate	Votes	%
Republican	Vince Dean	4,699	100.0%
Total votes		4,699	100.0%

2006 Tennessee House of Representatives District 30 Election
Party	Candidate	Votes	%
Republican	Vince Dean	15,740	100.0%
Total votes		15,740	100.0%

== District 31 ==
2006 Tennessee House of Representatives District 31 Republican Primary
Party	Candidate	Votes	%
Republican	Jim Cobb	3,137	43.1%
Republican	Randy Fairbanks	2,466	33.8%
Republican	Ed Warren	766	10.5%
Republican	Christian Lanier	535	7.3%
Republican	John G. McDougal	383	5.3%
Total votes		7,287	100.0%

2006 Tennessee House of Representatives District 31 Democratic Primary
Party	Candidate	Votes	%
Democratic	J. Glenn Moseley	2,435	100.0%
Total votes		2,435	100.0%

2006 Tennessee House of Representatives District 31 Election
Party	Candidate	Votes	%
Republican	Jim Cobb	12,991	65.3%
Democratic	J. Glenn Moseley	6,897	34.7%
Total votes		19,888	100.0%

== District 32 ==
2006 Tennessee House of Representatives District 32 Democratic Primary
Party	Candidate	Votes	%
Democratic	Dennis Ferguson	5,141	100.0%
Total votes		5,141	100.0%

2006 Tennessee House of Representatives District 32 Election
Party	Candidate	Votes	%
Democratic	Dennis Ferguson	14,842	100.0%
Total votes		14,842	100.0%

== District 33 ==
2006 Tennessee House of Representatives District 33 Republican Primary
Party	Candidate	Votes	%
Republican	David Massengill	4,013	100.0%
Total votes		4,013	100.0%

2006 Tennessee House of Representatives District 33 Democratic Primary
Party	Candidate	Votes	%
Democratic	Jim Hackworth	4,374	100.0%
Total votes		4,374	100.0%

2006 Tennessee House of Representatives District 33 Election
Party	Candidate	Votes	%
Democratic	Jim Hackworth	12,085	61.5%
Republican	David Massengill	7,570	38.5%
Total votes		19,655	100.0%

== District 34 ==
2006 Tennessee House of Representatives District 34 Republican Primary
Party	Candidate	Votes	%
Republican	Donna Rowland	4,099	100.0%
Total votes		4,099	100.0%

2006 Tennessee House of Representatives District 34 Democratic Primary
Party	Candidate	Votes	%
Democratic	Mary Esther Bell	2,498	76.9%
Democratic	Jimmy L. Richardson, III	750	23.1%
Total votes		3,248	100.0%

2006 Tennessee House of Representatives District 34 Election
Party	Candidate	Votes	%
Republican	Donna Rowland	12,846	55.3%
Democratic	Mary Esther Bell	10,396	44.7%
Total votes		23,242	100.0%

== District 35 ==
2006 Tennessee House of Representatives District 35 Republican Primary
Party	Candidate	Votes	%
Republican	Dennis "Coach" Roach	3,909	58.9%
Republican	Judi Runions Swilling	1,367	20.6%
Republican	Rick Brewer	1,352	20.4%
Total votes		6,628	100.0%

2006 Tennessee House of Representatives District 35 Election
Party	Candidate	Votes	%
Republican	Dennis "Coach" Roach	9,867	68.9%
Independent	Edward (ED) Baldwin	4,443	31.1%
Total votes		14,310	100.0%

== District 36 ==
2006 Tennessee House of Representatives District 36 Republican Primary
Party	Candidate	Votes	%
Republican	William Baird	3,653	100.0%
Total votes		3,653	100.0%

2006 Tennessee House of Representatives District 36 Democratic Primary
Party	Candidate	Votes	%
Democratic	Gary Seale	3,069	100.0%
Total votes		3,069	100.0%

2006 Tennessee House of Representatives District 36 Election
Party	Candidate	Votes	%
Republican	William Baird	7,779	57.0%
Democratic	Gary Seale	5,877	43.0%
Total votes		13,656	100.0%

== District 37 ==
2006 Tennessee House of Representatives District 37 Republican Primary
Party	Candidate	Votes	%
Republican	Iva Michelle Russell	1,838	100.0%
Total votes		1,838	100.0%

2006 Tennessee House of Representatives District 37 Democratic Primary
Party	Candidate	Votes	%
Democratic	Bill W. Harmon	6,162	100.0%
Total votes		6,162	100.0%

2006 Tennessee House of Representatives District 37 Election
Party	Candidate	Votes	%
Democratic	Bill W. Harmon	12,551	71.8%
Republican	Iva Michelle Russell	4,929	28.2%
Total votes		17,480	100.0%

== District 38 ==
2006 Tennessee House of Representatives District 38 Democratic Primary
Party	Candidate	Votes	%
Democratic	Leslie E. Winningham	6,595	100.0%
Total votes		6,595	100.0%

2006 Tennessee House of Representatives District 38 Election
Party	Candidate	Votes	%
Democratic	Leslie E. Winningham	11,113	69.4%
Independent	Champ E. Langford	4,892	30.6%
Total votes		16,005	100.0%

== District 39 ==
2006 Tennessee House of Representatives District 39 Republican Primary
Party	Candidate	Votes	%
Republican	Bill Green	2,845	71.5%
Republican	Arthur Ray Burns	1,132	28.5%
Total votes		3,977	100.0%

2006 Tennessee House of Representatives District 39 Democratic Primary
Party	Candidate	Votes	%
Democratic	George Fraley	5,667	78.3%
Democratic	Wayne Brandon	1,569	21.7%
Total votes		7,236	100.0%

2006 Tennessee House of Representatives District 39 Election
Party	Candidate	Votes	%
Democratic	George Fraley	10,419	59.6%
Republican	Bill Green	7,059	40.4%
Total votes		17,478	100.0%

== District 40 ==
2006 Tennessee House of Representatives District 40 Republican Primary
Party	Candidate	Votes	%
Republican	Terri Lynn Weaver	3,069	100.0%
Total votes		3,069	100.0%

2006 Tennessee House of Representatives District 40 Democratic Primary
Party	Candidate	Votes	%
Democratic	Frank Buck	6,169	100.0%
Total votes		6,169	100.0%

2006 Tennessee House of Representatives District 40 Election
Party	Candidate	Votes	%
Democratic	Frank Buck	9,650	56.5%
Republican	Terri Lynn Weaver	6,901	40.4%
Independent	Carl Jones	520	3.0%
Total votes		17,071	100.0%

== District 41 ==
2006 Tennessee House of Representatives District 41 Democratic Primary
Party	Candidate	Votes	%
Democratic	John Mark Windle	8,177	100.0%
Total votes		8,177	100.0%

2006 Tennessee House of Representatives District 41 Election
Party	Candidate	Votes	%
Democratic	John Mark Windle	14,062	100.0%
Total votes		14,062	100.0%

== District 42 ==
2006 Tennessee House of Representatives District 42 Republican Primary
Party	Candidate	Votes	%
Republican	W.I. Howell Acuff	509	100.0%
Total votes		509	100.0%

2006 Tennessee House of Representatives District 42 Democratic Primary
Party	Candidate	Votes	%
Democratic	Henry Fincher	3,515	41.4%
Democratic	Charles Womack	2,817	33.2%
Democratic	Lewis F. Coomer	1,956	23.0%
Democratic	Thomas D. Willoughby	204	2.4%
Total votes		8,492	100.0%

2006 Tennessee House of Representatives District 42 Election
Party	Candidate	Votes	%
Democratic	Henry Fincher	12,797	76.5%
Independent	Bob Cunningham	3,228	19.3%
Independent	John Garland Western	700	4.2%
Total votes		16,725	100.0%

== District 43 ==
2006 Tennessee House of Representatives District 43 Democratic Primary
Party	Candidate	Votes	%
Democratic	Charles Curtiss	6,525	100.0%
Total votes		6,525	100.0%

2006 Tennessee House of Representatives District 43 Election
Party	Candidate	Votes	%
Democratic	Charles Curtiss	12,878	100.0%
Total votes		12,878	100.0%

== District 44 ==
2006 Tennessee House of Representatives District 44 Republican Primary
Party	Candidate	Votes	%
Republican	Tim Coker	2,483	100.0%
Total votes		2,483	100.0%

2006 Tennessee House of Representatives District 44 Democratic Primary
Party	Candidate	Votes	%
Democratic	Mike McDonald	3,649	100.0%
Total votes		3,649	100.0%

2006 Tennessee House of Representatives District 44 Election
Party	Candidate	Votes	%
Democratic	Mike McDonald	11,051	65.1%
Republican	Tim Coker	5,917	34.9%
Total votes		16,968	100.0%

== District 45 ==
2006 Tennessee House of Representatives District 45 Republican Primary
Party	Candidate	Votes	%
Republican	Debra Young Maggart	4,298	100.0%
Total votes		4,298	100.0%

2006 Tennessee House of Representatives District 45 Democratic Primary
Party	Candidate	Votes	%
Democratic	Patrick Gardner	1,980	100.0%
Total votes		1,980	100.0%

2006 Tennessee House of Representatives District 45 Election
Party	Candidate	Votes	%
Republican	Debra Young Maggart	13,034	63.9%
Democratic	Patrick Gardner	7,348	36.1%
Total votes		20,382	100.0%

== District 46 ==
2006 Tennessee House of Representatives District 46 Republican Primary
Party	Candidate	Votes	%
Republican	John Dee Worley	2,854	100.0%
Total votes		2,854	100.0%

2006 Tennessee House of Representatives District 46 Democratic Primary
Party	Candidate	Votes	%
Democratic	Stratton Bone	6,880	100.0%
Total votes		6,880	100.0%

2006 Tennessee House of Representatives District 46 Election
Party	Candidate	Votes	%
Democratic	Stratton Bone	12,842	67.0%
Republican	John Dee Worley	6,327	33.0%
Total votes		19,169	100.0%

== District 47 ==
2006 Tennessee House of Representatives District 47 Republican Primary
Party	Candidate	Votes	%
Republican	Judd Matheny	3,417	100.0%
Total votes		3,417	100.0%

2006 Tennessee House of Representatives District 47 Democratic Primary
Party	Candidate	Votes	%
Democratic	David E. Clark	2,704	54.6%
Democratic	Garth R. Segroves	2,246	45.4%
Total votes		4,950	100.0%

2006 Tennessee House of Representatives District 47 Election
Party	Candidate	Votes	%
Republican	Judd Matheny	10,121	52.6%
Democratic	David E. Clark	9,127	47.4%
Total votes		19,248	100.0%

== District 48 ==
2006 Tennessee House of Representatives District 48 Republican Primary
Party	Candidate	Votes	%
Republican	Joe Carr	2,091	73.8%
Republican	Angela H. Bransby	741	26.2%
Total votes		2,832	100.0%

2006 Tennessee House of Representatives District 48 Democratic Primary
Party	Candidate	Votes	%
Democratic	John Hood	3,438	100.0%
Total votes		3,438	100.0%

2006 Tennessee House of Representatives District 48 Election
Party	Candidate	Votes	%
Democratic	John Hood	9,258	56.4%
Republican	Joe Carr	7,144	43.6%
Total votes		16,402	100.0%

== District 49 ==
2006 Tennessee House of Representatives District 49 Republican Primary
Party	Candidate	Votes	%
Republican	Oscar D. Gardner	2,086	75.4%
Republican	Kevin Neal Fisher	682	24.6%
Total votes		2,768	100.0%

2006 Tennessee House of Representatives District 49 Democratic Primary
Party	Candidate	Votes	%
Democratic	Kent Coleman	2,862	100.0%
Total votes		2,862	100.0%

2006 Tennessee House of Representatives District 49 Election
Party	Candidate	Votes	%
Democratic	Kent Coleman	10,151	55.9%
Republican	Oscar D. Gardner	7,998	44.1%
Total votes		18,149	100.0%

== District 50 ==
2006 Tennessee House of Representatives District 50 Democratic Primary
Party	Candidate	Votes	%
Democratic	Gary W. Moore	3,105	100.0%
Total votes		3,105	100.0%

2006 Tennessee House of Representatives District 50 Election
Party	Candidate	Votes	%
Democratic	Gary W. Moore	12,216	100.0%
Total votes		12,216	100.0%

== District 51 ==
2006 Tennessee House of Representatives District 51 Democratic Primary
Party	Candidate	Votes	%
Democratic	Michael L. Turner	2,570	100.0%
Total votes		2,570	100.0%

2006 Tennessee House of Representatives District 51 Election
Party	Candidate	Votes	%
Democratic	Michael L. Turner	11,000	100.0%
Total votes		11,000	100.0%

== District 52 ==
2006 Tennessee House of Representatives District 52 Democratic Primary
Party	Candidate	Votes	%
Democratic	Rob Briley	2,817	100.0%
Total votes		2,817	100.0%

2006 Tennessee House of Representatives District 52 Election
Party	Candidate	Votes	%
Democratic	Rob Briley	9,849	80.7%
Independent	Jon Davidson	2,358	19.3%
Total votes		12,207	100.0%

== District 53 ==
2006 Tennessee House of Representatives District 53 Democratic Primary
Party	Candidate	Votes	%
Democratic	Janis Baird Sontany	2,335	73.8%
Democratic	Quintessa Hathaway	829	26.2%
Total votes		3,164	100.0%

2006 Tennessee House of Representatives District 53 Election
Party	Candidate	Votes	%
Democratic	Janis Baird Sontany	9,467	100.0%
Total votes		9,467	100.0%

== District 54 ==
2006 Tennessee House of Representatives District 54 Democratic Primary
Party	Candidate	Votes	%
Democratic	Brenda Gilmore	4,142	61.9%
Democratic	Edith Taylor Langster	2,173	32.5%
Democratic	Melvin Gill	379	5.7%
Total votes		6,694	100.0%

2006 Tennessee House of Representatives District 54 Election
Party	Candidate	Votes	%
Democratic	Brenda Gilmore	12,519	100.0%
Total votes		12,519	100.0%

== District 55 ==
2006 Tennessee House of Representatives District 55 Democratic Primary
Party	Candidate	Votes	%
Democratic	Gary Odom	3,183	100.0%
Total votes		3,183	100.0%

2006 Tennessee House of Representatives District 55 Election
Party	Candidate	Votes	%
Democratic	Gary Odom	12,781	100.0%
Total votes		12,781	100.0%

== District 56 ==
2006 Tennessee House of Representatives District 56 Republican Primary
Party	Candidate	Votes	%
Republican	Beth Harwell	5,780	100.0%
Total votes		5,780	100.0%

2006 Tennessee House of Representatives District 56 Election
Party	Candidate	Votes	%
Republican	Beth Harwell	20,272	100.0%
Total votes		20,272	100.0%

== District 57 ==
2006 Tennessee House of Representatives District 57 Republican Primary
Party	Candidate	Votes	%
Republican	Susan M. Lynn	6,169	100.0%
Total votes		6,169	100.0%

2006 Tennessee House of Representatives District 57 Election
Party	Candidate	Votes	%
Republican	Susan M. Lynn	21,258	100.0%
Total votes		21,258	100.0%

== District 58 ==
2006 Tennessee House of Representatives District 58 Republican Primary
Party	Candidate	Votes	%
Republican	Jim Boyd	237	100.0%
Total votes		237	100.0%

2006 Tennessee House of Representatives District 58 Democratic Primary
Party	Candidate	Votes	%
Democratic	Mary Pruitt	2,017	58.8%
Democratic	Jason Powell	1,414	41.2%
Total votes		3,431	100.0%

2006 Tennessee House of Representatives District 58 Election
Party	Candidate	Votes	%
Democratic	Mary Pruitt	8,113	84.1%
Republican	Jim Boyd	1,530	15.9%
Total votes		9,643	100.0%

== District 59 ==
2006 Tennessee House of Representatives District 59 Republican Primary
Party	Candidate	Votes	%
Republican	Mike Meadows	773	100.0%
Total votes		773	100.0%

2006 Tennessee House of Representatives District 59 Democratic Primary
Party	Candidate	Votes	%
Democratic	Sherry Jones	1,477	54.7%
Democratic	Richard R. Clark, Jr.	1,222	45.3%
Total votes		2,699	100.0%

2006 Tennessee House of Representatives District 59 Election
Party	Candidate	Votes	%
Democratic	Sherry Jones	7,960	71.1%
Republican	Mike B. Meadows	3,242	28.9%
Total votes		11,202	100.0%

== District 60 ==
2006 Tennessee House of Representatives District 60 Republican Primary
Party	Candidate	Votes	%
Republican	Juan Borges	1,470	100.0%
Total votes		1,470	100.0%

2006 Tennessee House of Representatives District 60 Democratic Primary
Party	Candidate	Votes	%
Democratic	Ben West, Jr.	2,779	100.0%
Total votes		2,779	100.0%

2006 Tennessee House of Representatives District 60 Election
Party	Candidate	Votes	%
Democratic	Ben West, Jr.	12,402	67.0%
Republican	Juan C. Borges	6,099	33.0%
Total votes		18,501	100.0%

== District 61 ==
2006 Tennessee House of Representatives District 61 Republican Primary
Party	Candidate	Votes	%
Republican	Charles M. Sargent, Jr.	5,015	100.0%
Total votes		5,015	100.0%

2006 Tennessee House of Representatives District 61 Election
Party	Candidate	Votes	%
Republican	Charles M. Sargent, Jr.	21,341	100.0%
Total votes		21,341	100.0%

== District 62 ==
2006 Tennessee House of Representatives District 62 Democratic Primary
Party	Candidate	Votes	%
Democratic	Curt Cobb	4,845	100.0%
Total votes		4,845	100.0%

2006 Tennessee House of Representatives District 62 Election
Party	Candidate	Votes	%
Democratic	Curt Cobb	11,593	100.0%
Total votes		11,593	100.0%

== District 63 ==
2006 Tennessee House of Representatives District 63 Republican Primary
Party	Candidate	Votes	%
Republican	Glen Casada	4,663	100.0%
Total votes		4,663	100.0%

2006 Tennessee House of Representatives District 63 Democratic Primary
Party	Candidate	Votes	%
Democratic	John A. Murphy	1,133	100.0%
Total votes		1,133	100.0%

2006 Tennessee House of Representatives District 63 Election
Party	Candidate	Votes	%
Republican	Glen Casada	19,258	67.6%
Democratic	John A. Murphy	9,245	32.4%
Total votes		28,503	100.0%

== District 64 ==
2006 Tennessee House of Representatives District 64 Republican Primary
Party	Candidate	Votes	%
Republican	Tom Dubois	4,669	100.0%
Total votes		4,669	100.0%

2006 Tennessee House of Representatives District 64 Democratic Primary
Party	Candidate	Votes	%
Democratic	Guy Z. Derryberry	3,701	80.9%
Democratic	Ricky Martin	873	19.1%
Total votes		4,574	100.0%

2006 Tennessee House of Representatives District 64 Election
Party	Candidate	Votes	%
Republican	Tom DuBois	10,567	53.5%
Democratic	Guy Z. Derryberry	9,185	46.5%
Total votes		19,752	100.0%

== District 65 ==
2006 Tennessee House of Representatives District 65 Republican Primary
Party	Candidate	Votes	%
Republican	James P. Moon	3,215	100.0%
Total votes		3,215	100.0%

2006 Tennessee House of Representatives District 65 Democratic Primary
Party	Candidate	Votes	%
Democratic	Eddie Bass	4,378	55.6%
Democratic	Lee Bussart Bowles	3,503	44.4%
Total votes		7,881	100.0%

2006 Tennessee House of Representatives District 65 Election
Party	Candidate	Votes	%
Democratic	Eddie Bass	9,376	59.7%
Republican	James P. Moon	6,318	40.3%
Total votes		15,694	100.0%

== District 66 ==
2006 Tennessee House of Representatives District 66 Republican Primary
Party	Candidate	Votes	%
Republican	Joshua G. Evans	2,114	52.6%
Republican	Patrick Carneal	1,905	47.4%
Total votes		4,019	100.0%

2006 Tennessee House of Representatives District 66 Democratic Primary
Party	Candidate	Votes	%
Democratic	Robert T. (Bob) Bibb	3,035	51.9%
Democratic	Shannon Polen	1,478	25.3%
Democratic	Larry Fletcher	837	14.3%
Democratic	James M. Hubbard	499	8.5%
Total votes		5,849	100.0%

2006 Tennessee House of Representatives District 66 Election
Party	Candidate	Votes	%
Democratic	Robert T. (Bob) Bibb	8,622	50.5%
Republican	Joshua G. Evans	8,453	49.5%
Total votes		17,075	100.0%

== District 67 ==
2006 Tennessee House of Representatives District 67 Republican Primary
Party	Candidate	Votes	%
Republican	Ken Takasaki	1,196	43.5%
Republican	Reber P. Kennedy, Jr.	789	28.7%
Republican	Wallace Redd	766	27.8%
Total votes		2,751	100.0%

2006 Tennessee House of Representatives District 67 Democratic Primary
Party	Candidate	Votes	%
Democratic	Joe Pitts	2,052	100.0%
Total votes		2,052	100.0%

2006 Tennessee House of Representatives District 67 Election
Party	Candidate	Votes	%
Democratic	Joe Pitts	6,703	54.0%
Republican	Ken Takasaki	5,715	46.0%
Total votes		12,418	100.0%

== District 68 ==
2006 Tennessee House of Representatives District 68 Republican Primary
Party	Candidate	Votes	%
Republican	Curtis Johnson	4,118	100.0%
Total votes		4,118	100.0%

2006 Tennessee House of Representatives District 68 Democratic Primary
Party	Candidate	Votes	%
Democratic	Tim Barnes	3,204	100.0%
Total votes		3,204	100.0%

2006 Tennessee House of Representatives District 68 Election
Party	Candidate	Votes	%
Republican	Curtis Johnson	10,158	55.5%
Democratic	Tim Barnes	8,151	44.5%
Total votes		18,309	100.0%

== District 69 ==
2006 Tennessee House of Representatives District 69 Democratic Primary
Party	Candidate	Votes	%
Democratic	David A. Shepard	6,309	100.0%
Total votes		6,309	100.0%

2006 Tennessee House of Representatives District 69 Election
Party	Candidate	Votes	%
Democratic	David A. Shepard	14,767	100.0%
Total votes		14,767	100.0%

== District 70 ==
2006 Tennessee House of Representatives District 70 Republican Primary
Party	Candidate	Votes	%
Republican	Joey Hensley	4,660	100.0%
Total votes		4,660	100.0%

2006 Tennessee House of Representatives District 70 Democratic Primary
Party	Candidate	Votes	%
Democratic	Timothy D. Dickey	4,064	100.0%
Total votes		4,064	100.0%

2006 Tennessee House of Representatives District 70 Election
Party	Candidate	Votes	%
Republican	Joey Hensley	10,813	62.9%
Democratic	Timothy D. Dickey	6,386	37.1%
Total votes		17,199	100.0%

== District 71 ==
2006 Tennessee House of Representatives District 71 Republican Primary
Party	Candidate	Votes	%
Republican	Vance W. Dennis	3,668	100.0%
Total votes		3,668	100.0%

2006 Tennessee House of Representatives District 71 Democratic Primary
Party	Candidate	Votes	%
Democratic	Randy "Bear" Rinks	5,440	100.0%
Total votes		5,440	100.0%

2006 Tennessee House of Representatives District 71 Election
Party	Candidate	Votes	%
Democratic	Randy "Bear" Rinks	9,214	58.8%
Republican	Vance W. Dennis	6,445	41.2%
Total votes		15,659	100.0%

== District 72 ==
2006 Tennessee House of Representatives District 72 Republican Primary
Party	Candidate	Votes	%
Republican	Steve K. McDaniel	4,522	100.0%
Total votes		4,522	100.0%

2006 Tennessee House of Representatives District 72 Election
Party	Candidate	Votes	%
Republican	Steve K. McDaniel	13,972	100.0%
Total votes		13,972	100.0%

== District 73 ==
2006 Tennessee House of Representatives District 73 Republican Primary
Party	Candidate	Votes	%
Republican	Jimmy Eldridge	6,363	100.0%
Total votes		6,363	100.0%

2006 Tennessee House of Representatives District 73 Election
Party	Candidate	Votes	%
Republican	Jimmy Eldridge	15,977	100.0%
Total votes		15,977	100.0%

== District 74 ==
2006 Tennessee House of Representatives District 74 Democratic Primary
Party	Candidate	Votes	%
Democratic	John C. Tidwell	7,257	100.0%
Total votes		7,257	100.0%

2006 Tennessee House of Representatives District 74 Election
Party	Candidate	Votes	%
Democratic	John C. Tidwell	13,871	100.0%
Total votes		13,871	100.0%

== District 75 ==
2006 Tennessee House of Representatives District 75 Republican Primary
Party	Candidate	Votes	%
Republican	Stephen R. Blackwell, Sr.	1,950	100.0%
Total votes		1,950	100.0%

2006 Tennessee House of Representatives District 75 Democratic Primary
Party	Candidate	Votes	%
Democratic	Willie "Butch" Borchert	7,705	100.0%
Total votes		7,705	100.0%

2006 Tennessee House of Representatives District 75 Election
Party	Candidate	Votes	%
Democratic	Willie "Butch" Borchert	13,261	74.1%
Republican	Stephen R. Blackwell, Sr.	4,631	25.9%
Independent	James Hart	4	0.0%
Total votes		17,896	100.0%

== District 76 ==
2006 Tennessee House of Representatives District 76 Republican Primary
Party	Candidate	Votes	%
Republican	David Hawks	1,796	100.0%
Total votes		1,796	100.0%

2006 Tennessee House of Representatives District 76 Democratic Primary
Party	Candidate	Votes	%
Democratic	Mark L. Maddox	4,875	100.0%
Total votes		4,875	100.0%

2006 Tennessee House of Representatives District 76 Election
Party	Candidate	Votes	%
Democratic	Mark L. Maddox	10,550	64.5%
Republican	David Hawks	5,808	35.5%
Total votes		16,358	100.0%

== District 77 ==
2006 Tennessee House of Representatives District 77 Republican Primary
Party	Candidate	Votes	%
Republican	Shelly Arnett	2,148	100.0%
Total votes		2,148	100.0%

2006 Tennessee House of Representatives District 77 Democratic Primary
Party	Candidate	Votes	%
Democratic	Phillip Pinion	6,253	83.8%
Democratic	Jim E. Theriac	1,205	16.2%
Total votes		7,458	100.0%

2006 Tennessee House of Representatives District 77 Election
Party	Candidate	Votes	%
Democratic	Phillip Pinion	12,035	73.4%
Republican	Shelly Arnett	4,351	26.6%
Total votes		16,386	100.0%

== District 78 ==
2006 Tennessee House of Representatives District 78 Republican Primary
Party	Candidate	Votes	%
Republican	Phillip Johnson	3,659	100.0%
Total votes		3,659	100.0%

2006 Tennessee House of Representatives District 78 Democratic Primary
Party	Candidate	Votes	%
Democratic	Bruce Gibbs	2,769	77.6%
Democratic	Kurt M. Scott	799	22.4%
Total votes		3,568	100.0%

2006 Tennessee House of Representatives District 78 Election
Party	Candidate	Votes	%
Republican	Phillip Johnson	9,072	52.4%
Democratic	Bruce Gibbs	8,227	47.6%
Total votes		17,299	100.0%

== District 79 ==
2006 Tennessee House of Representatives District 79 Republican Primary
Party	Candidate	Votes	%
Republican	Chris Crider	3,851	100.0%
Total votes		3,851	100.0%

2006 Tennessee House of Representatives District 79 Democratic Primary
Party	Candidate	Votes	%
Democratic	Cheri Childress	3,764	100.0%
Total votes		3,764	100.0%

2006 Tennessee House of Representatives District 79 Election
Party	Candidate	Votes	%
Republican	Chris Crider	10,371	57.2%
Democratic	Cheri Childress	7,750	42.8%
Total votes		18,121	100.0%

== District 80 ==
2006 Tennessee House of Representatives District 80 Democratic Primary
Party	Candidate	Votes	%
Democratic	Johnny W. Shaw	5,109	100.0%
Total votes		5,109	100.0%

2006 Tennessee House of Representatives District 80 Election
Party	Candidate	Votes	%
Democratic	Johnny W. Shaw	9,615	68.0%
Independent	James E. Wolfe Jr.	4,531	32.0%
Total votes		14,146	100.0%

== District 81 ==
2006 Tennessee House of Representatives District 81 Democratic Primary
Party	Candidate	Votes	%
Democratic	Jimmy Naifeh	6,098	100.0%
Total votes		6,098	100.0%

2006 Tennessee House of Representatives District 81 Election
Party	Candidate	Votes	%
Democratic	Jimmy Naifeh	12,553	100.0%
Total votes		12,553	100.0%

== District 82 ==
2006 Tennessee House of Representatives District 82 Democratic Primary
Party	Candidate	Votes	%
Democratic	Craig Fitzhugh	6,203	100.0%
Total votes		6,203	100.0%

2006 Tennessee House of Representatives District 82 Election
Party	Candidate	Votes	%
Democratic	Craig Fitzhugh	12,098	100.0%
Total votes		12,098	100.0%

== District 83 ==
2006 Tennessee House of Representatives District 83 Republican Primary
Party	Candidate	Votes	%
Republican	Brian Kelsey	7,632	100.0%
Total votes		7,632	100.0%

2006 Tennessee House of Representatives District 83 Election
Party	Candidate	Votes	%
Republican	Brian Kelsey	17,292	100.0%
Total votes		17,292	100.0%

== District 84 ==
2006 Tennessee House of Representatives District 84 Democratic Primary
Party	Candidate	Votes	%
Democratic	Joe Towns Jr	5,153	73.2%
Democratic	Ricky W Dixon	1,888	26.8%
Total votes		7,041	100.0%

2006 Tennessee House of Representatives District 84 Election
Party	Candidate	Votes	%
Democratic	Joe Towns, Jr.	13,155	100.0%
Total votes		13,155	100.0%

== District 85 ==
2006 Tennessee House of Representatives District 85 Democratic Primary
Party	Candidate	Votes	%
Democratic	Larry Turner	7,262	76.2%
Democratic	Errol D Harmon	1,536	16.1%
Democratic	Paul Lewis	735	7.7%
Total votes		9,533	100.0%

2006 Tennessee House of Representatives District 85 Election
Party	Candidate	Votes	%
Democratic	Larry Turner	17,806	100.0%
Total votes		17,806	100.0%

== District 86 ==
2006 Tennessee House of Representatives District 86 Republican Primary
Party	Candidate	Votes	%
Republican	George T Edwards III	1,371	100.0%
Total votes		1,371	100.0%

2006 Tennessee House of Representatives District 86 Democratic Primary
Party	Candidate	Votes	%
Democratic	Barbara Cooper	5,231	100.0%
Total votes		5,231	100.0%

2006 Tennessee House of Representatives District 86 Election
Party	Candidate	Votes	%
Democratic	Barbara Cooper	10,718	77.1%
Republican	George T. Edwards, III	3,191	22.9%
Total votes		13,909	100.0%

== District 87 ==
2006 Tennessee House of Representatives District 87 Democratic Primary
Party	Candidate	Votes	%
Democratic	Gary L Rowe	3,264	76.4%
Democratic	Jeff Shields	1,011	23.6%
Total votes		4,275	100.0%

2006 Tennessee House of Representatives District 87 Election
Party	Candidate	Votes	%
Democratic	Gary L. Rowe	8,325	100.0%
Total votes		8,325	100.0%

== District 88 ==
2006 Tennessee House of Representatives District 88 Democratic Primary
Party	Candidate	Votes	%
Democratic	Larry J Miller	4,304	100.0%
Total votes		4,304	100.0%

2006 Tennessee House of Representatives District 88 Election
Party	Candidate	Votes	%
Democratic	Larry J. Miller	10,081	100.0%
Total votes		10,081	100.0%

== District 89 ==
2006 Tennessee House of Representatives District 89 Republican Primary
Party	Candidate	Votes	%
Republican	John Farmer	1,771	100.0%
Total votes		1,771	100.0%

2006 Tennessee House of Representatives District 89 Democratic Primary
Party	Candidate	Votes	%
Democratic	Beverly R Marrero	2,681	67.8%
Democratic	Larry Henson	1,272	32.2%
Total votes		3,953	100.0%

2006 Tennessee House of Representatives District 89 Election
Party	Candidate	Votes	%
Democratic	Beverly Robison Marrero	7,869	67.3%
Republican	John Farmer	3,819	32.7%
Total votes		11,688	100.0%

== District 90 ==
2006 Tennessee House of Representatives District 90 Democratic Primary
Party	Candidate	Votes	%
Democratic	John J. Deberry Jr	5,791	100.0%
Total votes		5,791	100.0%

2006 Tennessee House of Representatives District 90 Election
Party	Candidate	Votes	%
Democratic	John J. Deberry, Jr.	11,881	100.0%
Total votes		11,881	100.0%

== District 91 ==
2006 Tennessee House of Representatives District 91 Democratic Primary
Party	Candidate	Votes	%
Democratic	Lois M. Deberry	5,536	90.1%
Democratic	Kavin Carter	605	9.9%
Total votes		6,141	100.0%

2006 Tennessee House of Representatives District 91 Election
Party	Candidate	Votes	%
Democratic	Lois M. Deberry	11,647	100.0%
Total votes		11,647	100.0%

== District 92 ==
2006 Tennessee House of Representatives District 92 Democratic Primary
Party	Candidate	Votes	%
Democratic	Henri E Brooks	5,025	71.5%
Democratic	Michael E Saine	1,230	17.5%
Democratic	Elbert Rich Jr	772	11.0%
Total votes		7,027	100.0%

2006 Tennessee House of Representatives District 92 Election
Party	Candidate	Votes	%
Democratic	Henri E. Brooks	12,233	100.0%
Independent	Elbert "Skip" Rich, Jr.	0	0.0%
Total votes		12,233	100.0%

== District 93 ==
2006 Tennessee House of Representatives District 93 Republican Primary
Party	Candidate	Votes	%
Republican	Tim Cook	2,454	100.0%
Total votes		2,454	100.0%

2006 Tennessee House of Representatives District 93 Democratic Primary
Party	Candidate	Votes	%
Democratic	Mike Kernell	4,068	100.0%
Total votes		4,068	100.0%

2006 Tennessee House of Representatives District 93 Election
Party	Candidate	Votes	%
Democratic	Mike Kernell	9,663	66.3%
Republican	Tim Cook	4,907	33.7%
Total votes		14,570	100.0%

== District 94 ==
2006 Tennessee House of Representatives District 94 Republican Primary
Party	Candidate	Votes	%
Republican	Dolores Gresham	6,766	100.0%
Total votes		6,766	100.0%

2006 Tennessee House of Representatives District 94 Democratic Primary
Party	Candidate	Votes	%
Democratic	Bob Doll	2,838	100.0%
Total votes		2,838	100.0%

2006 Tennessee House of Representatives District 94 Election
Party	Candidate	Votes	%
Republican	Dolores Gresham	13,268	64.3%
Democratic	Bob Doll	7,366	35.7%
Total votes		20,634	100.0%

== District 95 ==
2006 Tennessee House of Representatives District 95 Republican Primary
Party	Candidate	Votes	%
Republican	Curry Todd	9,143	100.0%
Total votes		9,143	100.0%

2006 Tennessee House of Representatives District 95 Election
Party	Candidate	Votes	%
Republican	Curry Todd	22,739	100.0%
Total votes		22,739	100.0%

== District 96 ==
2006 Tennessee House of Representatives District 96 Republican Primary
Party	Candidate	Votes	%
Republican	Steve McManus	3,126	50.5%
Republican	Brad Jobe	3,059	49.5%
Total votes		6,185	100.0%

2006 Tennessee House of Representatives District 96 Election
Party	Candidate	Votes	%
Republican	Steve McManus	14,683	100.0%
Total votes		14,683	100.0%

== District 97 ==
2006 Tennessee House of Representatives District 97 Republican Primary
Party	Candidate	Votes	%
Republican	Jim Coley	4,707	75.2%
Republican	Austin Farley	996	15.9%
Republican	Charles T Pitman	553	8.8%
Total votes		6,256	100.0%

2006 Tennessee House of Representatives District 97 Election
Party	Candidate	Votes	%
Republican	Jim Coley	13,143	100.0%
Total votes		13,143	100.0%

== District 98 ==
2006 Tennessee House of Representatives District 98 Democratic Primary
Party	Candidate	Votes	%
Democratic	Ulysses Jones Jr	6,005	100.0%
Total votes		6,005	100.0%

2006 Tennessee House of Representatives District 98 Election
Party	Candidate	Votes	%
Democratic	Ulysses Jones, Jr.	11,825	100.0%
Total votes		11,825	100.0%

== District 99 ==
2006 Tennessee House of Representatives District 99 Republican Primary
Party	Candidate	Votes	%
Republican	Ron Lollar	3,696	41.1%
Republican	Mike Wissman	1,340	14.9%
Republican	John Wilkerson	675	7.5%
Republican	Glen Bascom	621	6.9%
Republican	Clark W Plunk	516	5.7%
Republican	Nolen A Manley	473	5.3%
Republican	Steve Evans	443	4.9%
Republican	Jonathan Myers	230	2.6%
Total votes		8,994	100.0%

2006 Tennessee House of Representatives District 99 Democratic Primary
Party	Candidate	Votes	%
Democratic	Eric P Jones	1,695	70.6%
Democratic	Mike Young	705	29.4%
Total votes		2,400	100.0%

2006 Tennessee House of Representatives District 99 Election
Party	Candidate	Votes	%
Republican	Ron Lollar	15,803	72.2%
Democratic	Eric P. Jones	6,092	27.8%
Total votes		21,895	100.0%

== See also ==
- 2006 Tennessee elections
- 2006 Tennessee Senate election
