= 2018 Tennessee elections =

Tennessee state elections in 2018 were held on Tuesday, November 6, 2018. Primary elections for the United States Senate, United States House of Representatives, governorship, Tennessee Senate, Tennessee House of Representatives, as well as general local elections were held on August 2, 2018.

== United States Congress ==
=== Senate ===
Final results by county: Blackburn: 40–50%; 50–60%; 60–70%; 70–80%; Bredesen: 50–60%; 60–70%; 70–80%

Incumbent Republican senator Bob Corker opted to retire instead of running for a third term. Republican U.S. representative Marsha Blackburn won the open seat, defeating former Democratic governor Phil Bredesen.

The primaries took place on August 2, 2018, with Blackburn and Bredesen winning their respective party nominations.

=== Results ===
2018 United States Senate election in Tennessee
Party	Candidate	Votes	%	±%
Republican	Marsha Blackburn	1,227,483	54.71%	−10.18%
Democratic	Phil Bredesen	985,450	43.92%	+13.51%
Independent	Trudy Austin	9,455	0.42%	N/A
Independent	Dean Hill	8,717	0.39%	N/A
Independent	Kris L. Todd	5,084	0.23%	N/A
Independent	John Carico	3,398	0.15%	N/A
Independent	Breton Phillips	2,226	0.10%	N/A
Independent	Kevin Lee McCants	1,927	0.09%	N/A
Total votes		2,243,740	100.00%	N/A
Republican hold				

August 2, 2018, primary results

Results by county: Bredesen: Bredesen—80–90%; Bredesen—>90%

Democratic primary results
Party	Candidate	Votes	%
Democratic	Phil Bredesen	349,718	91.51%
Democratic	Gary Davis	20,170	5.28%
Democratic	John Wolfe Jr.	12,269	3.21%
Total votes		382,157	100%

Results by county: Blackburn: Blackburn—70–80%; Blackburn—80–90%; Blackburn—90%

Republican primary results
Party	Candidate	Votes	%
Republican	Marsha Blackburn	613,513	84.48%
Republican	Aaron Pettigrew	112,705	15.52%
Write-in		13	<0.01%
Total votes		726,231	100%

=== House of Representatives ===
District results: Republican: 60–70%; 70–80%; Democratic: 60–70%; 70–80%

Tennessee elected nine U.S. representatives, each representing one of Tennessee's nine congressional districts.

=== Results ===
District	Republican		Democratic		Others		Total		Result
District	Votes	%	Votes	%	Votes	%	Votes	%	Result
District 1	172,835	77.06%	47,138	21.02%	4,309	1.92%	224,282	100.0%	Republican hold
District 2	172,856	65.94%	86,668	33.06%	2,610	1.00%	262,134	100.0%	Republican hold
District 3	156,512	63.68%	84,731	34.48%	4,522	1.84%	245,765	100.0%	Republican hold
District 4	147,323	63.38%	78,065	33.58%	7,063	3.04%	232,451	100.0%	Republican hold
District 5	84,317	32.15%	177,923	67.85%	8	0.00%	262,248	100.0%	Democratic hold
District 6	172,810	69.47%	70,370	28.29%	5,560	2.24%	248,740	100.0%	Republican hold
District 7	170,071	66.86%	81,661	32.10%	2,652	1.04%	254,384	100.0%	Republican hold
District 8	168,030	67.66%	74,755	30.10%	5,560	2.24%	248,345	100.0%	Republican hold
District 9	34,901	19.23%	145,139	79.98%	1,436	0.79%	181,476	100.0%	Democratic hold
Total	1,279,655	59.25%	846,450	39.19%	33,720	1.56%	2,159,825	100.0%	

Popular vote
Republican	59.25%
Democratic	39.19%
Other	1.56%

House seats
Republican	77.78%
Democratic	22.22%

== Gubernatorial ==
Final results by county: Bill Lee: 50–60%; 60–70%; 70–80%; 80–90%; Karl Dean: 50–60%; 60–70%

Incumbent Republican governor Bill Haslam was term-limited, and was prohibited by the Constitution of Tennessee from seeking a third consecutive term. Republican candidate Bill Lee was elected with 59.6% of the vote, defeating Democratic nominee and former Nashville mayor Karl Dean.

The primaries took place on August 2, 2018, with Republican Bill Lee and Democrat Karl Dean winning their respective party nominations.

=== Results ===
Tennessee gubernatorial election, 2018
Party	Candidate	Votes	%	±%
Republican	Bill Lee	1,336,106	59.56%	−10.75%
Democratic	Karl Dean	864,863	38.55%	+15.71%
Independent	Other candidates	42,314	1.89%	N/A
Write-in		11	0.00%	0.00%
Total votes		2,243,294	100.0%	N/A
Republican hold				

August 2, 2018, primary results

Results by county: Dean: 40–50%; 50–60%; 60–70%; 70–80%; 80–90%; 90-100%; Fitzhugh: 40–50%; 50–60%; 70–80%; 80–90%; 90-100%

Democratic primary results
Party	Candidate	Votes	%
Democratic	Karl Dean	280,553	75.14
Democratic	Craig Fitzhugh	72,553	23.42
Democratic	Mezianne Vale Payne	20,284	5.44
Total votes		373,390	100.0

Results by county Lee: 20–30%; 30–40%; 40–50%; 50–60%; Boyd: 30–40%; 40–50%; 50–60%; Black: 20–30%; 30–40%

Republican primary results
Party	Candidate	Votes	%
Republican	Bill Lee	291,414	36.75
Republican	Randy Boyd	193,054	24.35
Republican	Diane Black	182,457	23.01
Republican	Beth Harwell	121,484	15.32
Republican	Kay White	3,215	0.41
Republican	Basil Marceaux	1,264	0.16
Total votes		792,888	100.0

== State legislature ==
=== State Senate ===

Results by senate districts

Winners:

Republican hold
Democratic hold
No election

Elections for 18 of the 33 seats in Tennessee's State Senate were held on November 6, 2018. There were two open seats.

After this election, Republicans had 28 seats while Democrats had five seats.

Summary of the November 6, 2018 Tennessee Senate election results
Party	Candidates	Votes		Seats				
Party	Candidates	No.	%	Before	Up	Won	After	+/–
Republican	16	671,278	58.86	28	14	14	28	Steady
Democratic	15	459,033	40.25	5	4	4	5	Steady
Independent	2	9,756	0.86	0	0	0	0	Steady
Write-in	2	421	0.04	0	0	0	0	Steady
Total		1,140,488	100	33	18	18	33	Steady

Popular vote
Republican	58.86%
Democratic	40.25%
Other	0.90%

Senate seats
Republican	84.85%
Democratic	15.15%

=== Closest race ===
This race was decided by a margin of under 10%:

District	Winner	Margin
District 31	Republican	1.78%

=== State House of Representatives ===

Results by State House districts

Winners:

Republican hold
Democratic hold
Republican gain
Democratic gain

The election of all 99 seats in the Tennessee House of Representatives occurred on November 6, 2018.

Republicans won 73 seats, while Democrats won 26 seats. Democrats gained a seat during this election.

Summary of the November 6, 2018 Tennessee House election results
Party	Candidates	Votes		Seats	
Party	Candidates	No.	%	No.	+/–
Republican	129	1,255,205	59.70%	73	▼1
Democratic	1	825,295	39.25%	26	▲1
Independent		22,045	1.05%	0	Steady
Write-in		18	0%	0	Steady
Total		2,102,563	100.00	99	Steady

Popular vote
Republican	59.70%
Democratic	39.25%
Independent	1.05%
Write-ins	0%

House seats
Republican	73.74%
Democratic	26.26%

== Local elections ==
=== Hamilton County ===
Final results by precinct: Coppinger: 50–60%; 60–70%; 70–80%; 80–90%; >90%; Brown: 50–60%; 60–70%; 70–80%; 80–90%; >90%; Tie No votes

Incumbent Republican Mayor Jim Coppinger won with 60.3% of the vote, defeating Democratic nominee Aloyse Brown.

=== Results ===
August 2, 2018 General election results
Party	Candidate	Votes	%
Republican	Jim Coppinger	33,588	60.26%
Democratic	Aloyse Brown	22,052	39.56%
Write-in	Write-in	102	0.18%
Total votes		55,742	100.00%

May 1, 2018, primary results

Democratic primary results
Party	Candidate	Votes	%
Democratic	Aloyse Brown	4,999	71.65%
Democratic	George Ryan Love	1,845	26.44%
Write-in	Write-in	133	1.91%
Total votes		6,977	100.00%

Republican primary results
Party	Candidate	Votes	%
Republican	Jim Coppinger (Incumbent)	11,471	97.80%
Write-in	Write-in	258	2.20%
Total votes		11,729	100.00%

=== Knox County ===
Final results by precinct: Jacobs: 50–60%; 60–70%; 70–80%; 80–90%; Haney: 50–60%; 60–70%; 70–80%; Tie

Republican businessman and professional wrestler, Glenn Jacobs (better known by his ring name, Kane), won the election with 66.4% of the vote against Democrat Linda Haney.

Incumbent mayor Tim Burchett, first elected in 2010, was term-limited and could not run for a third consecutive term. Instead, he successfully ran for the U.S. House of Representatives in Tennessee's 2nd congressional district, to succeed the retiring 30-year incumbent representative, Jimmy Duncan.

=== Results ===
General election results
Party	Candidate	Votes	%
Republican	Glenn Jacobs	51,814	66.38%
Democratic	Linda Haney	26,241	33.62%
Write-in	Tracy A. Clough (write-in)	2	0.00%
Total votes		78,057	96.14%

May 1, 2018, primary results

Democratic primary results
Party	Candidate	Votes	%
Democratic	Linda Haney	4,284	55.89%
Democratic	Rhonda Gallman	1,926	25.13%
Democratic	Rebecca Deloa	1,455	18.98%
Total votes		7,665	92.42%

Republican primary results
Party	Candidate	Votes	%
Republican	Glenn Jacobs	14,640	36.10%
Republican	Brad Anders	14,617	36.04%
Republican	Bob Thomas	11,301	27.86%
Total votes		40,558	98.17%

=== Maury County ===
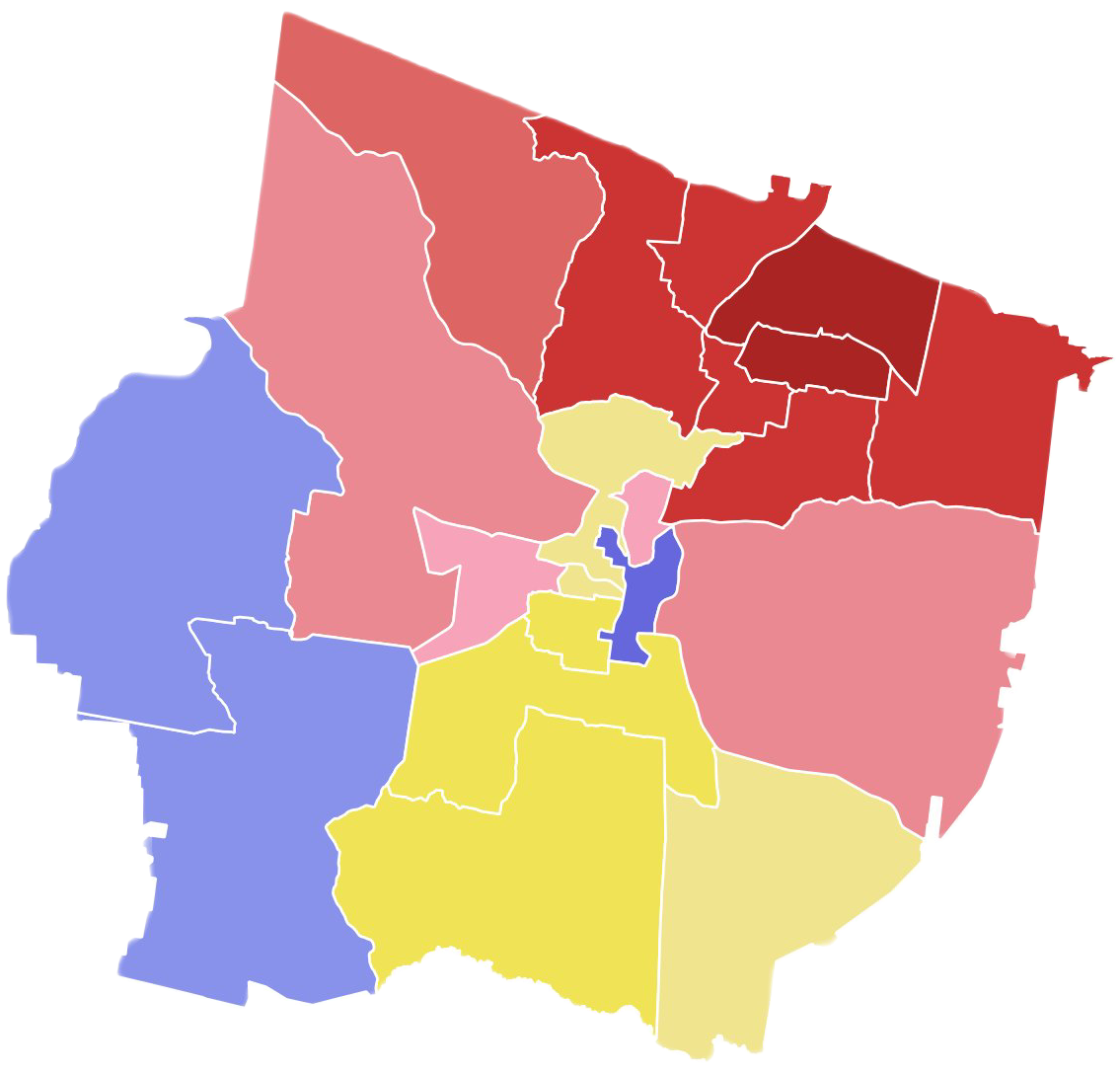
Final results by precinct: Ogles: >30%; >35%; >40%; >45%; >50%; Norman: >35%; >40%; Shackelford: >30%; >35%

Incumbent Mayor Charlie Norman lost re-election to Andy Ogles. Ogles obtained the Republican Party's nomination during a caucus, forcing Mayor Norman, a Republican, to run as an independent.

2018 Maury County Mayoral election
Party	Candidate	Votes	%
Republican	Andy Ogles	6,843	36.53
Independent	Charlie Norman (incumbent)	5,387	28.75
Independent	Sonny Shackelford	5,031	26.85
Independent	Amanda P. Kelton	1,474	7.87
Total votes		18,735	100.0
Republican hold			

=== Shelby County ===
Final results by precinct: Harris: 50–60%; 60–70%; 70–80%; 80–90%; >90%; Lenoir: 50–60%; 60–70%; 70–80%; 80–90%

Incumbent Republican Mayor Mark Luttrell was term-limited and was prohibited from seeking a third consecutive term; he instead ran for congress. Democratic candidate Lee Harris was elected mayor with 55.3% of the vote, defeating Republican nominee David Lenoir.

=== Results ===
August 2, 2018 general election results
Party	Candidate	Votes	%
Democratic	Lee Harris	84,989	55.32%
Republican	Mark Luttrell	68,502	44.59%
Write-in	Write-in	136	0.09%
Total votes		153,627	100.00%
Democratic gain from Republican			

May 1, 2018, primary results

Democratic primary results
Party	Candidate	Votes	%
Democratic	Lee Harris	34,106	76.13%
Democratic	Sidney Chism	10,434	23.29%
Write-in	Write-in	261	0.58%
Total votes		44,801	100.00%

Democratic primary results
Party	Candidate	Votes	%
Republican	David Lenoir	18,444	60.97%
Republican	Terry Roland	8,661	28.63%
Republican	Joy Touliatos	3,126	10.33%
Write-in	Write-in	19	0.06%
Total votes		30,250	100.00%

=== Clarksville ===
Incumbent Democratic mayor Kim McMillan ran for re-election, but lost her bid to a third term, losing by 213 votes to Democrat Joe Pitts in a four-way race.

November 6, 2018 Clarksville mayor election
Candidate	Votes	%
Joe Pitts	11,445	33.85%
Kim McMillan (I)	11,232	33.22%
Bill Summers	6,360	18.81%
DaJuan Little	4,686	13.86%
Write-ins	89	0.26%
Total	33,812	100%

=== Murfreesboro ===
Incumbent Republican mayor Shane McFarland ran for re-election and won a second term in office with an uncontested race.

August 1, 2018 Murfreesboro mayor election
Candidate	Votes	%
Shane McFarland (I)	15,671	98.75%
Write-ins	198	1.25%
Total	15,869	100%

=== Nashville ===
Final results by precinct: Briley: 20–30%; 30–40%; 40–50%; 50–60%; 60–70%; 80–90%; Swain: 30–40%; 40–50%; 50–60%; Gilmore: >90%

David Briley, a Democrat who became interim mayor after the resignation of Megan Barry, won outright without a runoff election.

Former Mayor Megan Barry resigned on March 6, 2018, for embezzlement on March 6, 2018, so the Davidson County Election Commission scheduled an election for August 2, 2018 to coincide with the state primary elections, school board elections and the election of several other municipal officials. However, mayoral candidate Ludye Wallace sued on the basis of state law (T.C.A. § 2-14-102) and a 2007 Metropolitan government charter amendment, both requiring an earlier election if the next general metropolitan election was more than twelve months away. The Tennessee Supreme Court agreed with Wallace's argument, unanimously ordering a mayoral election between May 21 and May 25.

=== Results ===
May 24, 2018 Nashville mayoral special election
Candidate	Votes	%
David Briley	44,845	54.44
Carol M. Swain	18,850	22.89
Erica Gilmore	4,608	5.59
Harold M. Love	4,349	5.28
Ralph Bristol	4,341	5.27
Jeff Obafemi Carr	3,790	4.60
David L. Hiland	325	0.39
Ludye N. Wallace	324	0.39
Caril J. Alford	243	0.30
Albert Hacker	169	0.21
Julia Clark-Johnson	168	0.20
Jeffery A. Napier	141	0.17
Jon Sewell	93	0.11
Write-in	122	0.15
Total votes	82,369	100.00

=== Nashville ballot measure ===
Let's Move Nashville
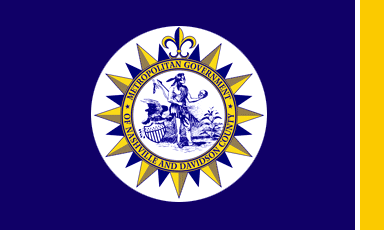
- May 1, 2018
- Transit Improvement Program Referendum Election
- Website: letsmovenashville.com

Results
Choice	Votes	%
Yes	44,766	36.03%
No	79,493	63.97%
- Precinct results No 80–90% 70–80% 60–70% 50–60% Yes 70–80% 60–70% 50–60% No data

Let's Move Nashville was a local referendum in Nashville, Tennessee, on May 1, 2018, that would have funded the construction of a mass transit system under the Nashville Metropolitan Transit Authority in Davidson County. The $8.9 billion plan would have included several light rail and bus rapid transit lines along major corridors, to be built between 2018 and 2032. The plan was proposed in 2017 by Mayor Megan Barry under the Tennessee IMPROVE Act and supported by some Nashville politicians and businesses.

The plan would have included 26 miles (42 km) of light rail and 25 miles (40 km) of bus rapid transit, as well as additional funding for local buses and the existing Music City Star commuter rail line. The light rail element of the plan would have been built in phases between 2026 and 2032, while the bus rapid transit lines would open in 2023. The plan was defeated in part due to an opposition campaign organized by Americans for Prosperity.

== See also ==
- Elections in Tennessee
- Political party strength in Tennessee
- Tennessee Democratic Party
- Tennessee Republican Party
- Government of Tennessee
- 2018 United States elections
