= Ben Reynolds =

Ben Reynolds may refer to:

- Ben Reynolds (Australian rugby league), Australian rugby league footballer
- Ben Reynolds (rugby league, born 1994), English rugby league footballer
- Ben Reynolds (athlete) (born 1990), Irish athlete
- Ben Reynolds, a member of The Horne Section

== Fictional characters ==
- Ben Reynolds, from the television series Lie to Me

== See also ==
- Benjamin Reynolds (1927–1976), member of the Pennsylvania House of Representatives
