= Joseph Pitts =

Joseph Pitts may refer to:

- Joe Pitts (Pennsylvania politician) (born 1939), U.S. Representative from Pennsylvania
- Joe Pitts (Tennessee politician) (born 1958), member of the Tennessee House of Representatives
- Joseph Pitts (author) (1663–1735), Englishman who was taken into slavery by Barbary pirates
