= L. Chris Ross =

American politician

Chris Ross

Member of the Pennsylvania House of Representatives from the 158th district
- In office January 7, 1997 – January 3, 2017
- Preceded by: Joseph Pitts
- Succeeded by: Eric Roe

Personal details
- Born: November 3, 1951 (age 74) Bryn Mawr, Pennsylvania
- Party: Republican
- Education: Harvard University

L. Chris Ross (born November 3, 1951) is an ex-six-term representative of the 158th Legislative District of Pennsylvania, United States. He was Republican Chairman of the House Intergovernmental Affairs Committee and was also a member of the House Environmental Resources and Energy Committee.

== Career ==
Ross' career in public service began shortly after his graduation from college. He worked on the successful campaigns of US Senator John Heinz in 1976 and former Pennsylvania Governor Dick Thornburgh in 1978.

He served seven years as Chairman of the London Grove Township's Board of Supervisors. Ross was also a former board member of the Upland School, where he chaired the school's Education Committee and was chairman of the board of directors of the Fairville Early Learning Center (now known as Fairville Friends School).

He also was a business owner of Rox Industries, Inc. prior to his tenure as a state representative.

== Personal ==
Ross is a 1974 graduate of Harvard University, where he earned a bachelor's degree in history. In 2002, the political website PoliticsPA named him to the list of "Smartest Legislators."

He is involved in several community groups and organizations, including the Brandywine Conservancy, the Pennsylvania Farm Bureau, and the Pennsylvania Environmental Council, among others.

Ross and his wife live in Kennett Square and have two children.

Pennsylvania House of Representatives
Preceded by Joseph Pitts	Member of the Pennsylvania House of Representatives for the 158th District; 1997–present	Succeeded by Incumbent
