= Eric Roe =

American politician

Member of the Chester County Board of Commissioners
- Incumbent
- Assumed office December 30, 2023 Serving with Marian Moskowitz and Josh Maxwell
- Preceded by: Michelle Kichline

Member of the Pennsylvania House of Representatives from the 158th district
- In office January 3, 2017 – November 30, 2018
- Preceded by: L. Chris Ross
- Succeeded by: Christina Sappey

Personal details
- Born: October 15, 1987 (age 39)
- Party: Republican
- Spouse: Alice
- Children: 4
- Education: American University (BA); University College London (MSc); Temple University (JD)
- Website: http://www.ericroe.org

Eric M. Roe is an American politician serving as a member of the Chester County Board of Commissioners since 2023. A Republican, he also served as a member of the Pennsylvania House of Representatives for the 158th district from 2017 to 2018.

== Early life ==
Roe is the son of QVC host Mary Beth Roe. He graduated from American University with a bachelor's degree in political science in 2010. He also has a master's degree in public policy from University College London and a Juris Doctor degree from Temple University, passing the bar in 2026.

He served at the Republican National Committee in Washington from 2009 to 2011 and was a staffer for Michael Steele. He worked as an administrative assistant until 2017.

He lives in West Bradford Township with his wife, Alice, and their four children.

== Electoral career ==
=== Pennsylvania House of Representatives ===
==== 2016 election ====
In April 2016, he won a write-in primary for state representative. In October, the chairman of the Chester County Democratic Party filed voter fraud charges against Roe claiming he did not meet the residency requirements, as he leased an apartment in Washington, D.C. as recently as 2013. However, a judge dismissed the charges. In the 2016 election, he received 17,617 votes or 53.2% of the vote, defeating Susan Rzucidlo.

Pennsylvania House of Representatives, District 158, 2016
Party	Candidate	Votes	%
Republican	Eric Roe	17,634	52.97
Democratic	Susan Rzucidlo	15,590	46.83
Write-in		65	0.20
Total votes		33,289	100.00
Republican hold			

==== 2018 election ====
In 2018, Roe filed to run for re-election. He ran unopposed in the Republican primary and faced Democrat Christina Sappey in the general election. In the election, Roe lost his seat to Sappey, 46% to 54%. He was one of 11 incumbents in the Philadelphia metropolitan area to lose their seats.

Pennsylvania House of Representatives, District 158, 2018
Party	Candidate	Votes	%
Democratic	Christina Sappey	15,641	53.40
Republican	Eric Roe (incumbent)	13,628	46.52
Write-in		24	0.08
Total votes		29,293	100.00
Democratic gain from Republican			

==== 2020 election ====
On November 15, 2019, Roe announced he would seek a rematch against Sappey to regain his former seat. Both Roe and Sappey were unopposed in their respective primaries. Sappey once again defeated Roe by a margin of 485 votes.

Pennsylvania House of Representatives, District 158, 2020
Party	Candidate	Votes	%
Democratic	Christina Sappey (incumbent)	19,294	50.61
Republican	Eric Roe	18,776	49.25
Write-in		52	0.14
Total votes		38,122	100.00
Democratic hold			

=== Chester County Board of Commissioners ===
==== 2023 election ====
In November 2022, Roe announced his candidacy for the 2023 Chester County Board of Commissioners election. Shortly after, incumbent Republican commissioner Michelle Kichline announced she would not seek reelection. In the four-candidate race, Roe secured a seat as the minority member of the board, finishing third in voting behind Democrats Josh Maxwell and Marian Moskowitz.

Chester County Board of Commissioners, 2023
Party	Candidate	Votes	%
Democratic	Josh Maxwell (incumbent)	87,869	28.89
Democratic	Marian Moskowitz (incumbent)	86,042	28.29
Republican	Eric Roe	68,343	22.47
Republican	David C. Sommers	61,752	20.30
Write-in		122	0.04
Total votes		304,128	100.00
Democratic hold			
