= Christina Sappey =

American politician (born 1962)

Member of the Pennsylvania House of Representatives from the 158th district
- Incumbent
- Assumed office January 1, 2019
- Preceded by: Eric Roe

Personal details
- Born: August 31, 1962 (age 64)
- Party: Democratic
- Education: Pennsylvania State University

Christina Sappey is an American politician serving as a member of the Pennsylvania House of Representatives, representing the 158th district. She is a member of the Democratic Party.

== Political career ==
Sappey worked as an aide to several Pennsylvania state legislators and served as the chief of staff to Carolyn Comitta and Barbara McIlvane Smith. Sappey currently sits on the Agriculture & Rural Affairs, Local Government, Secretary; Tourism & Economic & Recreational Development, Secretary; Subcommittee on Arts and Entertainment, and Veterans Affairs & Emergency Preparedness committees.

=== Pennsylvania House of Representatives ===
==== 2018 election ====
Sappey announced her candidacy for the Pennsylvania House of Representatives's 158th district in February 2018 and defeated Chris Nelms in the Democratic primary. Sappey won the general election, unseating one-term incumbent Eric Roe, garnering 15,301 votes to Roe's 13,607.

Pennsylvania House of Representatives, District 158, 2018
| Party | Candidate | Votes | % |
|---|---|---|---|
| Democratic | Christina Sappey | 15,641 | 53.40 |
| Republican | Eric Roe (incumbent) | 13,628 | 46.52 |
| Write-in | | 24 | 0.08 |
| Total votes | | 29,293 | 100.00 |
| Democratic gain from Republican | | | |

==== 2020 election ====
On November 15, 2019, Roe announced he would seek a re-match against Sappey to regain his former seat. Both Roe and Sappey were unopposed in their respective primaries. Sappey defeated Roe by a margin of 485 votes.

Pennsylvania House of Representatives, District 158, 2020
| Party | Candidate | Votes | % |
|---|---|---|---|
| Democratic | Christina Sappey (incumbent) | 19,294 | 50.61 |
| Republican | Eric Roe | 18,776 | 49.25 |
| Write-in | | 52 | 0.14 |
| Total votes | | 38,122 | 100.00 |
| Democratic hold | | | |

2022 election

Sappey defeated former Kennett Square Mayor Leon Spencer by 3,491 votes on November 8, 2022.

==== 2024 election ====
In November 2024, Sappey defeated realtor Tina Ayala.

Pennsylvania House of Representatives, District 158, 2024
| Party | Candidate | Votes | % |
|---|---|---|---|
| Democratic | Christina Sappey (incumbent) | 22,052 | 57.9 |
| Republican | Tina Ayala | 15,983 | 42.0 |
| Write-in | | 48 | 0.1 |
| Total votes | | 38,083 | 100.00 |
| Democratic hold | | | |

==== 2026 election ====
Sappy has won the Democratic Endorsement to face of Republican challenger Tina Ayala.
