= Ronnie Glynn =

American politician (born 1970)

Member of the Tennessee House of Representatives from the 67th district
- Incumbent
- Assumed office January 10, 2023
- Preceded by: Jason Hodges

Personal details
- Born: May 21, 1970 (age 56) Tennessee, U.S.
- Party: Democratic
- Spouse: Sherry Glynn
- Children: 4
- Education: Trident University International (BS)
- Website: House website

Military service
- Allegiance: United States
- Branch/service: United States Army
- Rank: Master sergeant

Ronnie Glynn (born May 21, 1970) is an American politician and small business owner. He currently represents the 67th district of the Tennessee House of Representatives as a Democrat. The district comprises portions of Montgomery County, including much of the city of Clarksville.

== Early life and military service ==
Ronnie Glynn was born on May 21, 1970. He was raised in Halls, Tennessee. Before reaching 20 years old, he had two children. Needing to provide for his family and with few other options, he joined the United States Army. Though he initially planned to spend five years in the military, he eventually completed 23 years of service, including time with the 82nd Airborne Division, the 7th Special Forces Group, and the 101st Airborne Division.

== Education and later career ==
Glynn owns the company Jumpmaster Inflatables, which he started after spending summers with his grandchildren and realizing a lack of local activities for kids their age. In 2023, he started a second business, Jumpmaster Trucking.

Glynn is a youth mentor with Big Brothers Big Sisters of America. He formerly chaired the Montgomery County Democratic Party.

== Tennessee House of Representatives ==
In 2022, Glynn ran to represent Tennessee House of Representatives District 67 after incumbent representative Jason Hodges chose not to seek re-election. In a narrow race, Glynn defeated Republican Tommy Vallejos in the general election. Glynn won the election by only 153 votes of over 11,000 cast. In winning the election, Glynn became the first Black representative from the Clarksville area in over 120 years.

== Personal life ==
Glynn is married to his wife, Sherry, and they have four children and 11 grandchildren. He is a lifelong Tennessean.
