= Jason Hodges =

American politician (born 1981)

Member of the Tennessee House of Representatives from the 67th district
- In office January 8, 2019 – January 10, 2023
- Preceded by: Joe Pitts
- Succeeded by: Ronnie Glynn

Personal details
- Born: June 21, 1981 (age 45)
- Party: Democratic
- Spouse: Diana Hodges
- Children: 2
- Education: Austin Peay State University (BS)
- Website: House website
- Military career
- Allegiance: United States
- Branch: United States Marine Corps

Jason Hodges (born June 21, 1981) is an American politician. He is a Democrat who represented the 67th district in the Tennessee House of Representatives.

== Biography ==
Hodges attended Northeast High School in Clarksville, Tennessee, and served in the United States Marine Corps. In 2012, he graduated cum laude from Austin Peay State University with a bachelor's degree in Political Science.

Hodges and his wife, Diana, have two children and live in Clarksville.

== Political career ==
In 2014, Hodges was elected to the Montgomery County Commission.

In 2018, Hodges ran for election to the District 67 seat in the Tennessee House of Representatives. He got the endorsement of outgoing District 67 representative Joe Pitts. Hodges won the Democratic primary with 81.6% of the vote, and went on to win the general election with 52.5% of the vote.

Hodges sits on the following House committees:

- Education Committee
- Higher Education Subcommittee
- Insurance Committee
- Life & Health Insurance Subcommittee
- Naming, Designating & Private Acts Committee

Hodges ran for re-election in 2020 and won, retiring before the 2022 elections in favor of Ronnie Glynn.

== Electoral record ==
2018 Democratic primary election: Tennessee House of Representatives, District 67
Party	Candidate	Votes	%
Democratic	Jason Hodges	2,240	81.6%
Democratic	Houston Rye	506	18.4%

2018 general election: Tennessee House of Representatives, District 67
Party	Candidate	Votes	%
Democratic	Jason Hodges	8,531	52.5%
Republican	Tommy Vallejos	7,290	44.9%
Independent	John Dawson	429	2.6%
