= Designer Anabolic Steroid Control Act of 2014 =

- Long title: To amend the Controlled Substances Act to more effectively regulate anabolic steroids.
- Announced in: the 113th United States Congress
- Sponsored by: Rep. Joseph R. Pitts (R, PA-16)
- Number of co-sponsors: 1

Codification
- U.S.C. sections affected: 21 U.S.C. § 355, 18 U.S.C., 21 U.S.C. § 825, 21 U.S.C. § 811, 21 U.S.C. § 802, and others.
- Agencies affected: United States Department of Justice, Drug Enforcement Administration, Department of Health and Human Services

Legislative history
- Introduced in the House as H.R. 4771 by Rep. Joseph R. Pitts (R, PA-16) on May 29, 2014; Committee consideration by House Committee on Energy and Commerce, House Committee on the Judiciary, United States House Judiciary Subcommittee on Crime, Terrorism, Homeland Security and Investigations; Passed the House on September 15, 2014 (voice vote); Passed the Senate on December 11, 2014 (voice vote); Signed into law by President Barack Obama on December 18, 2014

The Designer Anabolic Steroid Control Act of 2014 (H.R. 4771) is a bill that expanded the list of anabolic steroids regulated by the Drug Enforcement Administration (DEA) to include about two dozen new substances and established new crimes relating to false labeling of steroids. The bill established a penalty of up to $500,000 against those found to be falsely labeling their anabolic steroid products.

Specifically, the text of the bill reads: "In the case of a violation...by an importer, exporter, manufacturer, or distributor...up to $500,000 per violation...For purposes of this subparagraph, a violation is defined as each instance of importation, exportation, manufacturing, distribution, or possession with intent to manufacture or distribute.

The bill further reads: "In the case of a distribution, dispensing, or possession with intent to distribute or dispense in violation of...this section at the retail level, up to $1000 per violation. For purposes of this paragraph, the term at the retail level refers to products sold, or held for sale, directly to the consumer for personal use. Each package, container or other separate unit containing an anabolic steroid that is distributed, dispensed, or possessed with intent to distribute or dispense at the retail level in violation...shall be considered a separate violation. "

The bill was introduced into the United States House of Representatives during the 113th United States Congress. Barack Obama signed the bill into law on December 18, 2014.

== Background ==
Anabolic steroids, technically known as anabolic-androgenic steroids (AAS), are drugs that are structurally related to the cyclic steroid ring system and have similar effects to testosterone in the body. They increase protein within cells, especially in skeletal muscles.

Anabolic steroids were first made in the 1930s, and are now used therapeutically in medicine to stimulate muscle growth and appetite, induce male puberty and treat chronic wasting conditions, such as cancer and AIDS. The American College of Sports Medicine acknowledges that AAS, in the presence of adequate diet, can contribute to increases in body weight, often as lean mass increases and that the gains in muscular strength achieved through high-intensity exercise and proper diet can be additionally increased by the use of AAS in some individuals.

Health risks can be produced by long-term use or excessive doses of anabolic steroids. These effects include harmful changes in cholesterol levels (increased low-density lipoprotein and decreased high-density lipoprotein), acne, high blood pressure, liver damage (mainly with oral steroids), and dangerous changes in the structure of the left ventricle of the heart. Conditions pertaining to hormonal imbalances such as gynecomastia and testicular atrophy may also be caused by anabolic steroids.

Ergogenic uses for anabolic steroids in sports, racing, and bodybuilding as performance-enhancing drugs are controversial because of their adverse effects and the potential to gain unfair advantage is considered cheating. Their use is referred to as doping and banned by all major sporting bodies. For many years, AAS have been by far the most detected doping substances in IOC-accredited laboratories. In countries where AAS are controlled substances, there is often a black market in which smuggled, clandestinely manufactured or even counterfeit drugs are sold to users.

One estimate indicates that over 10 million Americans a year take anabolic steroids approximately four percent of whom are adolescents.

== Provisions of the bill ==
The Designer Anabolic Steroid Control Act of 2014 amended the Controlled Substances Act to: (1) expand the list of substances defined as "anabolic steroids"; (2) authorize the United States Attorney General to issue a temporary order adding a drug or other substance to the list of anabolic steroids; (3) impose enhanced criminal and civil penalties for possessing or trafficking in any anabolic steroid, or product containing an anabolic steroid, unless it bears a label clearly identifying the anabolic steroid by the nomenclature used by the International Union of Pure and Applied Chemistry (IUPAC); and (4) authorize the Attorney General to collect data and analyze products to determine whether they contain anabolic steroids and are properly labeled.

The bill specified that a substance shall not be considered to be a drug or hormonal substance that is considered to be an anaboloic steroid if it is: (1) an herb or other botanical; (2) a concentrate, metabolite, or extract of, or a constituent isolated directly from, an herb or other botanical; (3) a combination of two or more such substances (i.e., botanical or concentrate, metabolite, or extract); or (4) a dietary ingredient for purposes of the Federal Food, Drug, and Cosmetic Act. Provides that any person claiming the benefit of an exemption or exception from being considered a drug or hormonal substance shall bear the burden of providing the appropriate evidence.

== Congressional Budget Office report ==
This summary is based largely on the summary provided by the Congressional Budget Office, as ordered reported by the House Committee on Energy and Commerce on July 15, 2014. This is a public domain source.

The Congressional Budget Office (CBO) estimates that implementing H.R. 4771 would have no significant costs to the federal government. Enacting the bill could affect direct spending and revenues; therefore, pay-as-you-go procedures apply. However, CBO estimates that any effects would be insignificant for each year.

H.R. 4771 would expand the list of anabolic steroids regulated by the Drug Enforcement Administration (DEA) to include about two dozen new substances and would establish new crimes relating to false labeling of steroids. As a result, the government might be able to pursue cases involving drug use that it otherwise would not be able to prosecute. CBO expects that H.R. 4771 would apply to a relatively small number of additional offenders, however, so any increase in costs for law enforcement, court proceedings, or prison operations would not be significant. Any such costs would be subject to the availability of appropriated funds.

Because those prosecuted and convicted under H.R. 4771 could be subject to civil and criminal fines, the federal government might collect additional fines if the legislation is enacted. Civil fines are recorded as revenues. Criminal fines are recorded as revenues, deposited in the Crime Victims Fund, and later spent. CBO expects that any additional revenues and direct spending would not be significant because of the small number of additional cases likely to be affected.

H.R. 4771 contains no intergovernmental mandates as defined in the Unfunded Mandates Reform Act (UMRA) and would impose no costs on state, local, or tribal governments.

H.R. 4771 would impose private-sector mandates, as defined in UMRA, on manufacturers, sellers, importers, exporters, distributors, and consumers of products that contain certain chemical compounds that would be defined as anabolic steroids. CBO estimates that the cost of complying with those mandates would probably exceed the annual threshold established in UMRA for private-sector mandates ($152 million in 2014, adjusted annually for inflation).

The bill would impose private-sector mandates by adding 25 new compounds, and any compounds found to be structurally similar, to the list of anabolic steroids regulated under the Controlled Substances Act. Consumers would need a prescription from a licensed practitioner in order to purchase products containing the newly listed compounds. Sellers, manufacturers, and importers of such products would be required to obtain an authorization from state and federal authorities in order to make or possess the compounds. However, based on information from the Food and Drug Administration (FDA), the DEA, and industry professionals, CBO expects that the majority of the affected entities would either replace the regulated compounds with new ones or discontinue the distribution of the affected products. Therefore, the cost of the mandate would be the forgone income from lost sales.

Because of the nature of the market being regulated, the scope of sales affected is difficult to determine. As products are found to contain compounds that are structurally similar to the compounds listed, industry sales could decline significantly. Some industry experts estimate that the revenues generated by the sale of products containing such compounds amount to between $2 billion and $5 billion annually. (Those figures include sales of some products that already are not in compliance or not being sold in compliance with FDA or DEA regulations.) Although identifying which items would be affected by the legislation would be difficult, given the estimated magnitude of industry profits, even a 10 percent decrease in income as a result of the bill would exceed the annual threshold for private-sector mandates.

The bill also would impose a mandate on importers, exporters, manufacturers, and distributors by requiring that any anabolic steroid or product containing an anabolic steroid be labeled as such, using the nomenclature of the International Union of Pure and Applied Chemistry. The cost of the mandate would probably be small.

== Procedural history ==
The Designer Anabolic Steroid Control Act of 2014 was introduced into the United States House of Representatives on May 29, 2014, by Rep. Joseph R. Pitts (R, PA-16). The bill was referred to the United States House Committee on Energy and Commerce, the United States House Committee on the Judiciary, the United States House Energy Subcommittee on Health, and the United States House Judiciary Subcommittee on Crime, Terrorism, Homeland Security and Investigations. On September 15, 2014, the House voted to pass the bill in a voice vote. The President signed the bill into law on December 18, 2014.

== Debate and discussion ==
Rep. Pitts, who sponsored the bill, said that the bill "will protect consumers from these harmful products by giving the DEA the tools and authority to classify designer steroids as controlled substances." However, although the Act contains the phrase "designer steroid" in the title, the text omits the phrase entirely and fails to provide a legal definition.

Delegate Donna Christensen (D-VI) was also in favor of the bill, arguing that it "will go a long way to removing dangerous steroids from the market."

Supporters argued that the bill would "make it easier for the attorney general to identify legally sold commercial products that contain illicit anabolic steroids." The United Natural Products Alliance and the Council for Responsible Nutrition both supported the bill. Despite the Act granting new powers to identify those products, as of July 7, 2017, the Attorney General had failed to publicly or privately do so.

Detractors have noted the unscientific and indefinite verbiage of the Act, citing as proof that various executive agencies have maintained contradictory opinions as to what constitutes a designer steroid for enforcement purposes.

== See also ==
- List of bills in the 113th United States Congress
