= Pennsylvania House of Representatives, District 158 =

American legislative district

Pennsylvania's 158th State House of Representatives district
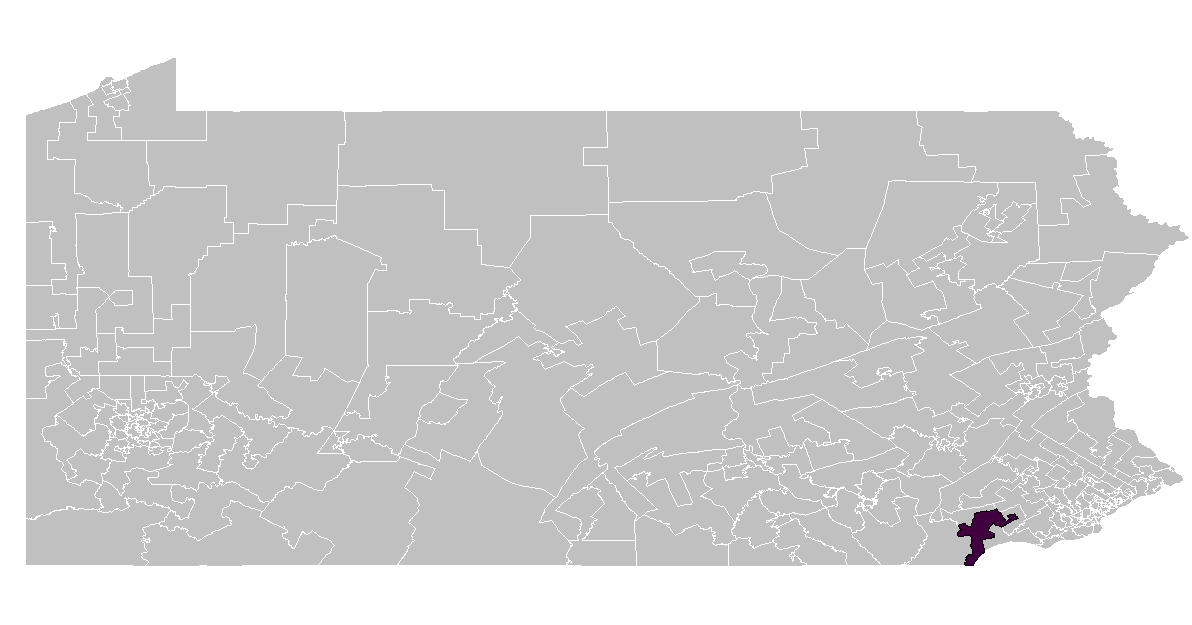
Representative
Christina Sappey; D–West Bradford Township

The 158th Pennsylvania House of Representatives District is located in Chester County and includes the following areas:

- Avondale
- East Bradford Township
- East Marlborough Township
- London Britain Township
- New Garden Township
- Newlin Township
- West Bradford Township
- West Goshen Township (PART, Districts Middle and South)
- West Marlborough Township

== Representatives ==
Representative	Party	Years	District home	Note
Prior to 1969, seats were apportioned by county.
Benjamin J. Reynolds	Republican	1969 – 1972		
Joseph R. Pitts	Republican	1973 – 1996	Kennett Square	Elected to the U.S. House of Representatives from the 16th District
L. Chris Ross	Republican	1997 – 2016	Kennett Square	Retired
Eric Roe	Republican	2017 – 2018	Kennett Square	Unsuccessful candidate for re-election
Christina Sappey	Democratic	2019 – present	Kennett Square	Incumbent
