= Tennessee House of Representatives 67th district =

State legislative district in Tennessee

Tennessee's 67th State House of Representatives district
- Map of Tennessee House districts with the 67th District shaded in red
Representative
Ronnie Glynn; D–Clarksville
since 2022
- Demographics: 52% White; 27% Black; 12% Hispanic; 1% Asian; 1% Hawaiian/Pacific Islander; 6% Multiracial
- Population (2024): 82,296

Tennessee House of Representatives District 67 is one of the 99 legislative districts in the Tennessee House of Representatives. The district covers part of the urban core of Clarksville, Tennessee in Montgomery County, Tennessee, including neighborhoods surrounding Austin Peay State University. It has been represented by Ronnie Glynn since 2022. The district is considered highly competitive in elections. In 2024, Donald Trump won the district with a margin of 1.8%.

== Demographics ==
The Tennessee Comptroller estimates the 2024 population at 82,296.

- 52.5% of the district is White
- 24.8% of the district is Black
- 13.7% of the district is Hispanic
- 1.4% of the district is Asian
- 0.6% of the district is Pacific Islander
- 0.3% of the district is Other
- 0.1% of the district is Native American
- 6.6% of the district is Two or more races

Detailed demographic data for District 67 is available through the Tennessee Comptroller’s district profile and Statistical Atlas.

== List of Representatives ==
Ronnie Glynn is an American politician and retired United States Army soldier serving as a member of the Tennessee House of Representatives from the 67th district. He assumed office on December 10, 2022. Glynn served 23 years in the Army, including with the 82nd Airborne Division, 7th Special Forces Group, and 101st Airborne Division at Fort Campbell, with three combat deployments to Afghanistan and Iraq.

Representative	Party	Years of Service	Hometown
Ronnie Glynn	Democratic	December 10, 2022 – present	Clarksville
Jason Hodges	Democratic	January 8, 2019 - January 10, 2023	Clarksville
Joe Pitts	Democratic	January 9, 2007 - December 31, 2018	Clarksville
Kim McMillan	Democratic	January 10, 1995 - January 9, 2007	Clarksville
Peggy Steed Knight	Democratic	1991 - 1994	Clarksville
David L. Ussery	Republican	1981 - 1990	Clarksville
Riley C. Darnell	Democratic	1971 - 1980	Clarksville
Frank J. Runyon	Democratic	1969 - 1970	Clarksville
John H. Peay	Democratic	1963 - 1968	Clarksville
Paul D. Welker	Democratic	1961 - 1962	Clarksville
S. Cuyler Dunbar	Democratic	1959 - 1960	Woodlawn
John M. Richardson	Democratic	1955 - 1958	Clarksville
Robert L. Norris	Democratic	1953 - 1954	Clarksville
Staton Davis Jr.	Democratic	1951 - 1952	Clarksville
James H. Broome	Democratic	1949 - 1950	Palmyra
James C. Cunningham	Democratic	1947 - 1948	Clarksville

== Elections ==
=== 2024 ===
Tennessee House of Representatives District 67 general election, 2024
Party	Candidate	Votes	%
Democratic	Ronnie Glynn	11,055	50.3%
Republican	Jamie Peltz	10,924	49.7%
Total votes		21,979	100.00%
Democratic hold			

=== 2022 ===
Tennessee House of Representatives District 67 general election, 2022
Party	Candidate	Votes	%
Democratic	Ronnie Glynn	5,767	50.7%
Republican	Tommy Vallejos	5,614	49.3%
Total votes		11,381	100.00%
Democratic hold			

=== 2020 ===
Tennessee House of Representatives District 67 general election, 2020
Party	Candidate	Votes	%
Democratic	Jason Hodges	12,841	54.9%
Republican	John Dawson	10,538	45.1%
Total votes		23,379	100.00%
Democratic hold			

=== 2018 ===
Tennessee House of Representatives District 67 general election, 2018
Party	Candidate	Votes	%
Democratic	Jason Hodges	8,531	52.5%
Republican	Tommy Vallejos	7,290	44.9%
Independent	John Dawson	429	2.6%
Total votes		16,250	100.00%
Democratic hold			

=== 2016 ===
Tennessee House of Representatives District 67 general election, 2016
Party	Candidate	Votes	%
Democratic	Joe Pitts	10,564	61.68%
Independent	Mike Warner	6,562	38.32%
Total votes		17,126	100.00%
Democratic hold			

=== 2014 ===
Tennessee House of Representatives District 67 general election, 2014
Party	Candidate	Votes	%
Democratic	Joe Pitts	6,154	70%
Independent	Mike Warner	2,638	30%
Total votes		8,792	100.00%
Democratic hold			

=== 2012 ===
Tennessee House of Representatives District 67 general election, 2012
Party	Candidate	Votes	%
Democratic	Joe Pitts	12,700	97%
Write-in	Mike Warner	398	3%
Total votes		13,098	100.00%
Democratic hold			

=== 2010 ===
Tennessee House of Representatives District 67 general election, 2010
Party	Candidate	Votes	%
Democratic	Joe Pitts	5,387	53.14%
Republican	Neil Revlett	4,750	46.86%
Total votes		10,137	100.00%
Democratic hold			

=== 2008 ===
Tennessee House of Representatives District 67 general election, 2008
Party	Candidate	Votes	%
Democratic	Joe Pitts	12,525	100.00%
Total votes		12,525	100.00%
Democratic hold			

=== 2006 ===
Tennessee House of Representatives District 67 general election, 2006
Party	Candidate	Votes	%
Democratic	Joe Pitts	6,703	53.97%
Republican	Ken Takasaki	5,715	46.03%
Total votes		12,418	100.00%
Democratic hold			

=== 2004 ===
Tennessee House of Representatives District 67 general election, 2004
Party	Candidate	Votes	%
Democratic	Kim McMillan	10,376	60.86%
Republican	Cecil Stout	6,672	39.14%
Total votes		17,048	100.00%
Democratic hold			

=== 2002 ===
Tennessee House of Representatives District 67 general election, 2002
Party	Candidate	Votes	%
Democratic	Kim McMillan	7,064	61.41%
Republican	Sue Gonzalez	4,439	38.59%
Total votes		11,503	100.00%
Democratic hold			

=== 2000 ===
Tennessee House of Representatives District 67 general election, 2000
Party	Candidate	Votes	%
Democratic	Kim McMillan	13,983	99.93%
Write-in		10	0.07%
Total votes		13,993	100.00%
Democratic hold			

=== 1998 ===
Tennessee House of Representatives District 67 general election, 1998
Party	Candidate	Votes	%
Democratic	Kim McMillan	7,034	63.28%
Republican	Rod Wolfe	4,082	36.72%
Total votes		11,116	100.00%
Democratic hold			

=== 1996 ===
1996 Tennessee House of Representatives District 67 general election
Party	Candidate	Votes	%
Democratic	Kim McMillan	12,019	100.00%
Total votes		12,019	100.00%
Democratic hold			

=== 1994 ===
1994 Tennessee House of Representatives District 67 general election
Party	Candidate	Votes	%
Democratic	Kim McMillan	5,818	52.25%
Republican	Bill Wyatt	5,145	46.21%
Independent	John B. Artrip	172	1.54%
Total votes		11,135	100.00%
Democratic hold			
