= Benjamin Reynolds =

American politician

Benjamin J. Reynolds

Member of the Pennsylvania House of Representatives from the 158th district
- In office January 7, 1969 – November 30, 1972
- Preceded by: District Created
- Succeeded by: Joe Pitts

Member of the Pennsylvania House of Representatives from the Chester County district
- In office January 5, 1965 – November 30, 1968

Personal details
- Born: January 29, 1927 West Grove, Pennsylvania, US
- Died: August 25, 1976 (aged 49)
- Party: Republican

Benjamin Joseph Reynolds (January 29, 1927 – August 25, 1976) was a Republican member of the Pennsylvania House of Representatives.

== Biography ==
Reynolds was born on January 29, 1927, in West Grove, Pennsylvania. He attended Kennett Consolidated School and became a dairy farmer and milk retailer. He was elected a supervisor of New Garden Township (1960–1965). He was elected to the Pennsylvania House of Representatives in 1964 and served four consecutive terms; he declined to run for re-election in 1972.

Reynolds married Eleanor Annette Marshall (1924–1999) on January 2, 1960. They lived in the Reynolds homestead near Avondale, Pennsylvania, and had two sons, Warren and John.

Reynolds was interested in conservation and was an early promoter of spray irrigation of farmland. He died August 25, 1976.
