= Joe Pitts (Pennsylvania politician) =

American politician (born 1939)

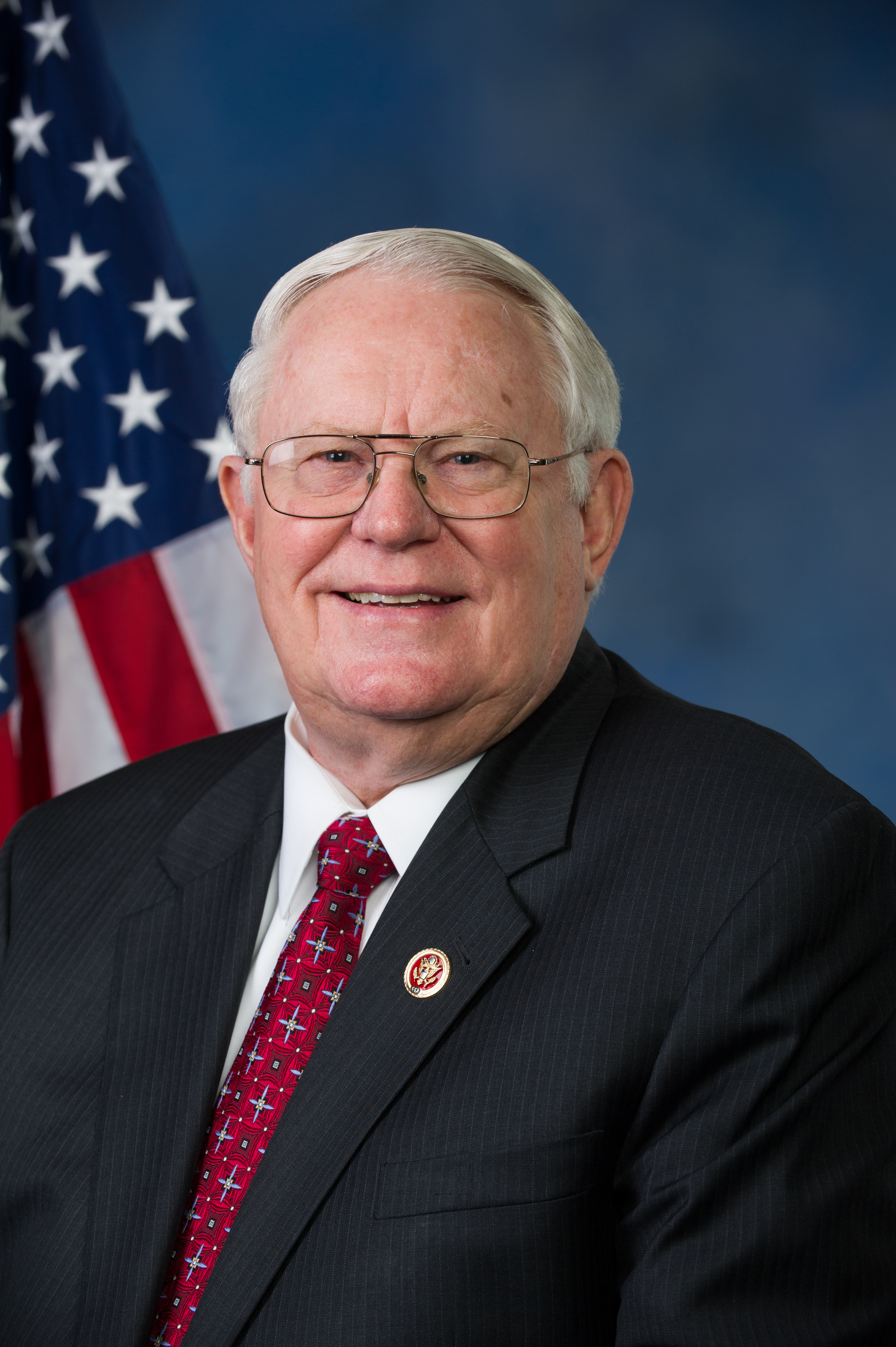
- Official portrait, 2013

Member of the U.S. House of Representatives from Pennsylvania's 16th district
- In office January 3, 1997 – January 3, 2017
- Preceded by: Robert Walker
- Succeeded by: Lloyd Smucker

Member of the Pennsylvania House of Representatives from the 158th district
- In office January 2, 1973 – November 30, 1996
- Preceded by: Benjamin Reynolds
- Succeeded by: Chris Ross

Personal details
- Born: Joseph Russell Pitts; October 10, 1939 (age 87) Lexington, Kentucky, U.S.
- Party: Republican
- Spouse: Virginia Pratt (m. 1968)
- Education: Asbury University (BA); West Chester University (MEd)

Military service
- Branch/service: United States Air Force
- Years of service: 1963–1969
- Rank: Captain
- Unit: 346th Bombardment Squadron
- Battles/wars: Vietnam War
- Awards: Air Medal
- Pitts's voice Pitts introducing legislation to clarify requirements for Essential Air Service funding. Recorded April 29, 2003

Joseph Russell Pitts (born October 10, 1939) is a former American politician who served as the U.S. representative for Pennsylvania's 16th congressional district from 1997 to 2017. He is a member of the Republican Party. The district was based in Lancaster and Reading and included much of the Amish country. It also included the far southwestern suburbs of Philadelphia in Chester County.

In December 2015, Congressman Pitts announced he would not run for reelection in 2016.

== Early life and education ==
Pitts was born in Lexington, Kentucky and graduated from Asbury College. Pitts served five and a half years in the United States Air Force, with three tours in Vietnam. Initially commissioned as a second lieutenant, he was promoted to captain by the time he left the service. He graduated second in his class from Navigator School, after which he was trained as an electronic warfare officer. As an EW officer, he served on B-52 Stratofortresses out of Westover Air Force Base, Massachusetts, with payloads of nuclear bombs. In all, he completed 116 combat missions in the Vietnam War and earned an Air Medal with five oak leaf clusters.

== Career ==
After leaving the Air Force in 1969, Pitts moved to Kennett Square, Pennsylvania, a suburb of Philadelphia and the hometown of his wife, Ginny. They built a house there, where they still live today.

Pitts was elected to the Pennsylvania House of Representatives in 1972, representing Kennett Square and surrounding areas of southeastern Chester County.

=== U.S. House of Representatives ===
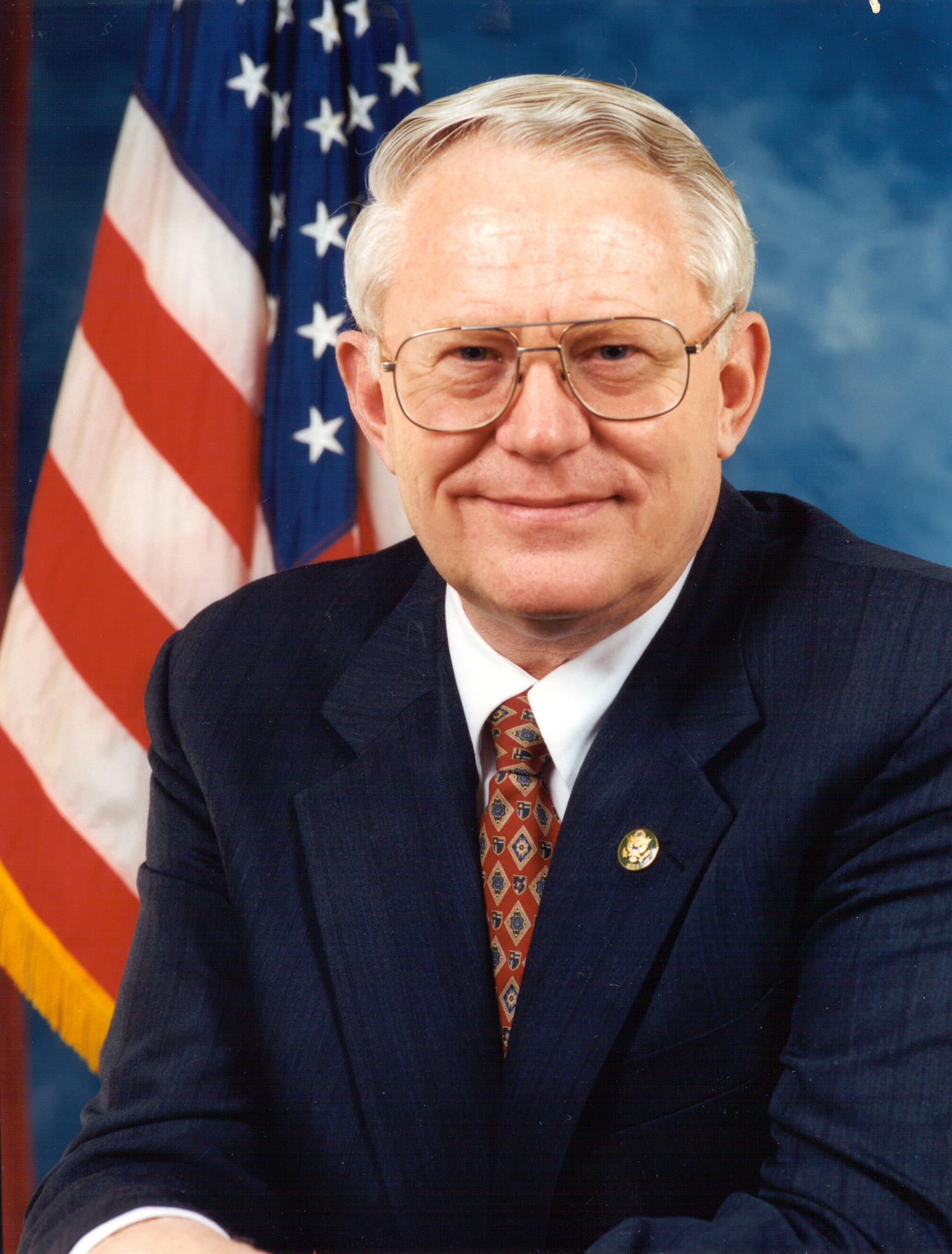
Early portrait of Joe Pitts

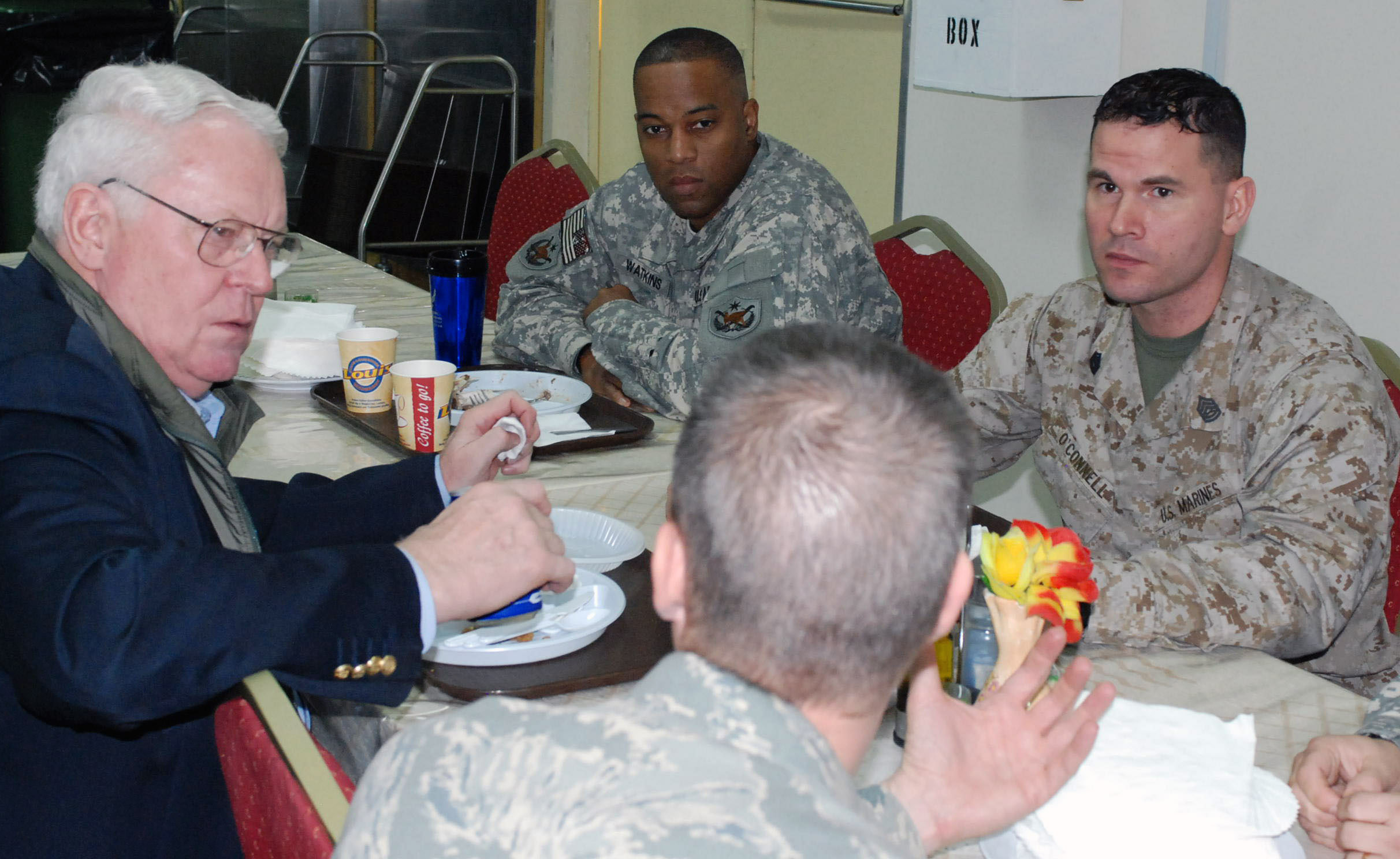
Pitts visiting Baghdad in January 2008.

==== Elections ====
After 10-term Republican congressman Bob Walker decided to retire in 1996, Pitts jumped into the crowded five-candidate Republican primary—the real contest in what has long been a strongly Republican district. He won the primary with 45% of the vote, defeating the second place candidate by 19 percentage points. In the general election, he defeated Democrat James G. Blaine 59%–38%.

He won re-election easily in 1998 (71%), 2000 (67%), 2002 (88%), and 2004 (64%).

===== 2006 =====
Pitts originally promised to serve only 10 years (five terms), but announced he would run again in 2006 amid considerable controversy. Despite the controversy, Pitts won re-election to a sixth term, defeating Democratic businesswoman Lois Herr 57%–40%. The seventeen-point margin was the second smallest margin in his career.

===== 2008 =====
In 2008, Pitts decided to seek a seventh term. He was challenged by Navy veteran and construction contractor Bruce Slater. Pitts defeated him 56%–39%. The sixteen-point margin was the smallest margin in his career.

===== 2010 =====
Pitts was challenged by Democrat Lois Herr for a third rematch. He won re-election to an 8th term, defeating her 65%–35%.

===== 2012 =====
Pitts was challenged by Democrat businesswoman Aryanna Strader and Independent Jim Bednarski In the general election, Pitts won re-election to a ninth term, defeating Strader 55%–39%. The sixteen-point margin is tied for 2008 in being the smallest margin in his career. He lost in Berks County by 12,000 votes (35%) and won Chester County by only 500 votes (1%). He won Lancaster handily with over 60% of the vote.

==== Tenure ====
Pitts has a very conservative voting record, which is not surprising given that his district has historically been one of the most Republican districts in the Northeast. However, redistricting made the 16th somewhat less Republican. The old 16th had a Cook Partisan Voting Index of R+8, but since the 2010 round of redistricting, it had a PVI of R+4. He received 100% ratings from the American Conservative Union in 2005 and the Christian Coalition of America in 2004.

In 2002, after a federal judge ordered the removal of the Ten Commandments from the Chester County courthouse, Pitts released a press statement that said, "I think that religion and the Ten Commandments in particular should have a role in our public life" and supported The Ten Commandments Defense Act (H.R. 2045). Since his first term Pitts has been chairman of the Values Action Team, a subgroup of the Republican Study Committee that coordinates legislation with the Christian right.

Over the years Pitts has received 100% ratings from the U.S. Chamber of Commerce and 0% ratings from Public Citizens Congress Watch. In 2008 the ACLU gave him an 18% rating, the Human Rights Campaign gave him a score of 0%, and the Leadership Conference on Civil Rights gave him a score of 4%. In 2007–08 the John Birch Society gave him a score of 67%, and the American Conservative Union gave him a 100% rating, as did the Christian Coalition. Others: American Association of University Women, 2007–08, 16%; Republicans for Environmental Protection, 7% in 2007; and the Children's Health Fund, 2007–08, 0%; National Rifle Association, 2008, A; Brady Campaign to Prevent Gun Violence, 2003, 0%; National Breast Cancer Coalition, 2007–08, 0%; Children's Health Fund 2007–08, 0%. Ratings from labor groups are consistently at or near 0%; the Alliance for Worker Freedom, 2008, 100%.

Pitts visited Afghanistan after the fall of the Taliban and Pakistan in 2002. He visited Kuwait, Jordan, Iraq, and Israel in 2008 as part of a Congressional Delegation. He is a leading congressional advocate of nuclear power, and "introduced a bill in 2009 to fast-track the regulatory process for approving new reactors, he called it the 'Streamline America's Future Energy (SAFE) Nuclear Act.'"

Pitts is an advocate of a federal prohibition of online poker. In 2006, he cosponsored H.R. 4411, the Bob Goodlatte-Jim Leach Internet Gambling Prohibition Act and H.R. 4777, the Internet Gambling Prohibition Act.

The Stupak–Pitts Amendment is an amendment to America's Affordable Health Choices Act of 2009 written by Pitts and Democrat Bart Stupak of Michigan, and it inserted abortion into the national health overhaul debate. This amendment continues his longtime opposition to abortion. According to Jeff Sharlet, a contributing editor for Harper's, Pitts is a documented member of the Bible-oriented Christian group "The Fellowship (Christian organization)" and the C Street group in Washington, D.C.

In the 112th Congress, Pitts introduced the Protect Life Act, which would place additional restrictions on abortion access.

In July 2011, Pitts was revealed, in course of an FBI investigation, to have accepted tainted funds traced to the intelligence services of Pakistan. These funds were routed through the so-called Kashmiri American Council (KAC), run by Syed Ghulam Nabi Fai, who was convicted of several felonies by the Federal government.

In October 2015, Pitts was named to serve on the Select Investigative Panel on Planned Parenthood.

==== Legislation ====
On March 26, 2014, Pitts introduced the Protecting Access to Medicare Act of 2014 (H.R. 4302; 113th Congress) into the House. The bill would delay until March 2015 the pending cut to Medicare, a cut that has been regularly delayed for over a decade. The bill would not offset this spending with increased revenue or cuts to spending in other places, a source of controversy. Pitts said he still supports a permanent fix to the Sustainable Growth Rate (SGR) formula and is "sponsoring this bill today because it is my earnest hope that this is the last patch we will have to pass."

On May 29, 2014, Pitts introduced into the House the Designer Anabolic Steroid Control Act of 2014 (H.R. 4771; 113th Congress), a bill that would expand the list of anabolic steroids regulated by the Drug Enforcement Administration (DEA) to include about two dozen new substances and would establish new crimes relating to false labeling of steroids. This type of steroid enhances muscles. The bill would establish a penalty of up to $500,000 against those found to be falsely labeling their anabolic steroid products.

==== Committee assignments ====
- Committee on Energy and Commerce
  - United States House Energy Subcommittee on Environment and Economy
  - United States House Energy Subcommittee on Health (Chair)
- Commission on Security and Cooperation in Europe

==== Caucus memberships ====
- Republican Study Committee
- Congressional Constitution Caucus

=== Electoral history ===
Pennsylvania's 16th congressional district: Results 1996–2012
Year	Democratic	Votes	Pct	Republican	Votes	Pct	Third Party	Votes	Pct	Third Party	Votes	Pct
1996	James Blaine	78,598	38%	Joe Pitts	124,511	59%	Bob Yorczyk	6,485	3%			
1998	Bob Yorczyk	40,092	29%	Joe Pitts	95,979	71%						
2000	Bob Yorczyk	80,177	33%	Joe Pitts	162,403	67%						
2002				Joe Pitts	119,046	89%	Will Todd	8,720	7%	Kenneth Brenneman	6,766	5%
2004	Lois Herr	98,410	35%	Joe Pitts	183,620	64%	William Hagen	3,269	1%			
2006	Lois Herr	80,915	40%	Joe Pitts	115,741	57%	John Murphy	7,958	4%			
2008	Bruce Slater	120,193	39%	Joe Pitts	170,329	56%	John Murphy	11,768	4%	Daniel Frank	2,877	1%
2010	Lois Herr	70,994	35%	Joe Pitts	134,113	65%						
2012	Aryanna Strader	111,185	39%	Joe Pitts	156,192	55%	John Murphy	12,250	4%	James Bednarski	5,154	2%
2014	Tom Houghton	74,513	42.3%	Joe Pitts	101,722	57.7%						

== Personal life ==
Joe and his wife Ginny have three children as well as four grandchildren.

== Bibliography ==
- Pitts, Joe (April 24, 2002). Thaddeus Stevens, A Man Before His Time. United States House of Representatives. Archived from the original on January 16, 2003.

U.S. House of Representatives
Preceded by Robert Walker	Member of the U.S. House of Representatives from Pennsylvania's 16th congressional district 1997–2017	Succeeded by Lloyd Smucker
Preceded by Frank Wolf	Chair of the House Human Rights Commission; 2015–2017	Succeeded by Randy Hultgren
U.S. order of precedence (ceremonial)
Preceded by Chaka Fattah as Former U.S. Representative	Order of precedence of the United States as Former U.S. Representative	Succeeded by Bob Brady as Former U.S. Representative
