= Kim McMillan =

American politician (born 1963)

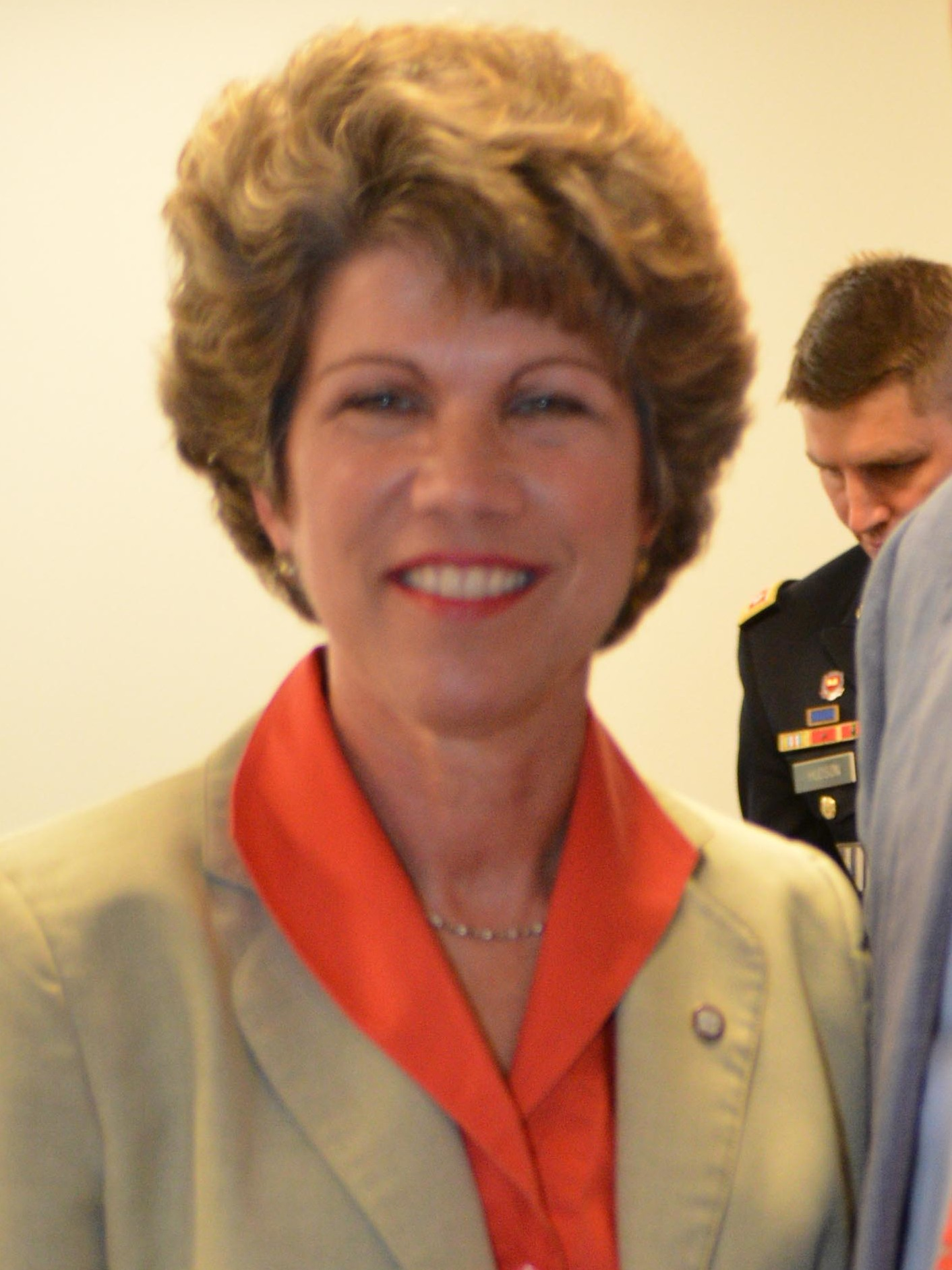
- McMillan in 2014

Mayor of Clarksville, Tennessee
- In office January 3, 2011 – January 2, 2019
- Preceded by: Johnny Piper
- Succeeded by: Joe Pitts

Member of the Tennessee House of Representatives from the 67th district
- In office January 10, 1995 – January 9, 2007
- Preceded by: Peggy Steed Knight
- Succeeded by: Joe Pitts

Personal details
- Born: October 15, 1963 (age 62)
- Party: Democratic
- Education: University of Tennessee (BA); Winston College of Law (JD)
- Website: House website

Kim McMillan (née Ambrester, born October 15, 1963) is an American politician who was the first female mayor of Clarksville, Tennessee from 2011 to 2019. McMillan was also the first woman to be elected Majority Leader of the Tennessee House of Representatives. McMillan entered the 2010 Tennessee gubernatorial election, but dropped out to run for mayor of Clarksville instead.

== Education ==
McMillan graduated from Knoxville's South-Young High School and from the University of Tennessee at Knoxville. She received her J.D. degree from the University of Tennessee College of Law.

== Political career ==
In 2006, McMillan did not seek re-election to the Tennessee House of Representatives and accepted an appointment by Tennessee Governor Phil Bredesen to his Cabinet, where she served as Senior Advisor to the Governor. In 2008, she returned to her hometown of Clarksville, Tennessee.

McMillan entered the 2010 Tennessee gubernatorial election on March 1, 2009. On March 31, 2010, she dropped out of the race for governor, announcing that she would instead run for mayor of Clarksville, and support Mike McWherter's candidacy for governor.

In 2018, Joe Pitts defeated McMillan in a bid for a 3rd term.

== Family ==
McMillan was formerly married to Larry McMillan, who was Chancellor for the 19th Judicial District of Tennessee.

== See also ==
- 2010 Tennessee gubernatorial election
- 2018 Clarksville mayoral election
