= Joe Pitts (Tennessee politician) =

American politician (born 1958)

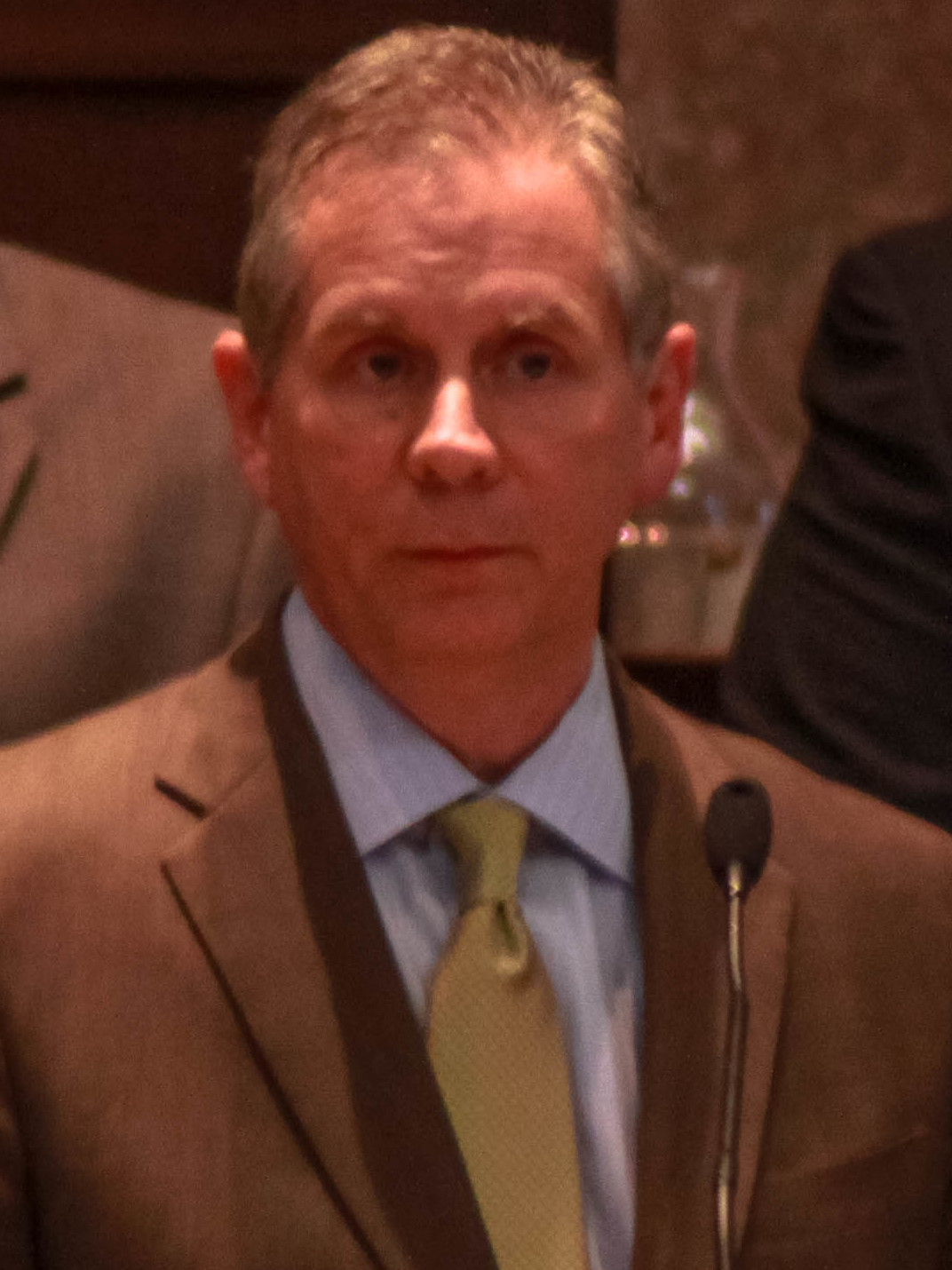
- Pitts in 2014

Mayor of Clarksville, Tennessee
- Incumbent
- Assumed office January 2, 2019
- Preceded by: Kim McMillan

Member of the Tennessee House of Representatives from the 67th district
- In office January 9, 2007 – December 31, 2018
- Preceded by: Kim McMillan
- Succeeded by: Jason Hodges

Personal details
- Born: August 15, 1958 (age 68) Clarksville, Tennessee, U.S.
- Party: Democratic
- Spouse: Cynthia Pitts
- Children: 5
- Education: Austin Peay State University (BS)
- Website: Mayoral website House website

Joe Pitts (born August 15, 1958) is an American politician serving as Mayor of Clarksville, Tennessee as well as a former Democratic member of the Tennessee House of Representatives representing District 67.

== Early life and career ==
Pitts was born in Clarksville, TN and graduated from Northwest High School in 1976. He earned his BS from Austin Peay State University in 1980. He went on to study at the Institute for Organizational Management at the University of Georgia and the Emerging Political Leaders program at the University of Virginia. Pitts served as vice president of Planters Bank from 2005-2018.

== Elections ==
- 2012 Pitts was unopposed for both the August 2, 2012 Democratic Primary, winning with 781 votes, and won the November 6, 2012 General election with 12,700 votes (97.0%) against write-in candidate Mike Warner.
- 2006 When District 67 Democratic Representative Kim McMillan left the Legislature and left the seat open, Pitts was unopposed for the August 3, 2006 Democratic Primary, winning with 2,052 votes, and won the November 7, 2006 General election with 6,703 votes (54.0%) against Republican nominee Ken Takasaki.
- 2008 Pitts was unopposed for both the August 7, 2008 Democratic Primary, winning with 1,837 votes, and the November 4, 2008 General election, winning with 12,525 votes.
- 2010 Pitts was unopposed for the August 5, 2010 Democratic Primary, winning with 1,746 votes, and was unopposed for the November 2, 2010 General election, winning with 5,387 votes (53.1%) against Republican nominee Neil Revlett.
- 2018 Pitts was elected mayor of Clarksville, TN, on November 6, 2018, winning over incumbent Kim McMillan with 33.8 percent of the vote over McMillan's 33.2 percent.
- He won re-election in 2022, with 54.5 percent of the vote.

== Personal life ==
Pitts and his wife, Cynthia, have five children.
