= Alec Mills =

American professional baseball player (born 1991)

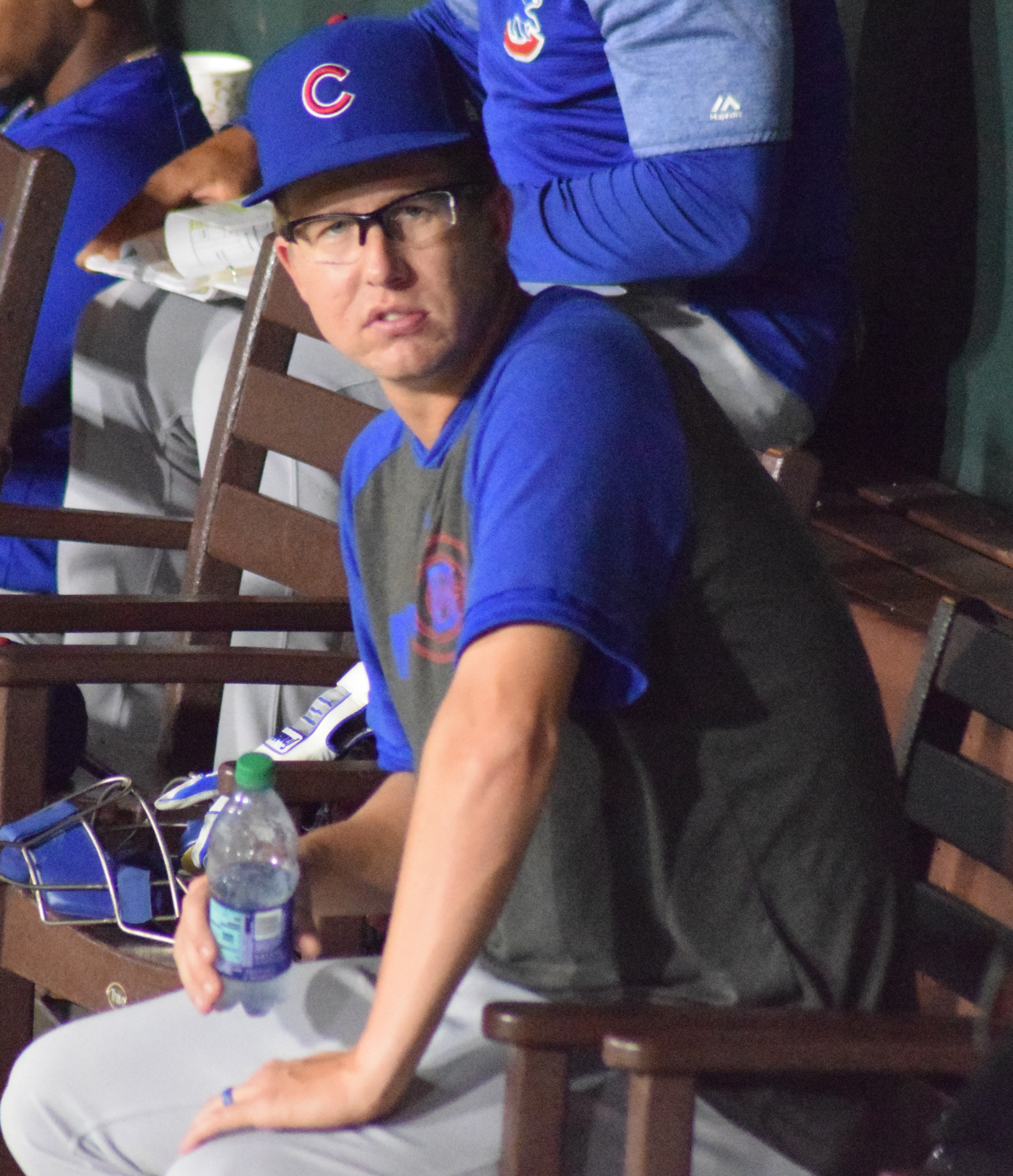
- Mills with the Chicago Cubs in 2019
- Pitcher
- Born: November 30, 1991 (age 34); Clarksville, Tennessee, U.S.
- Batted: Right Threw: Right

MLB debut
- May 18, 2016, for the Kansas City Royals

Last MLB appearance
- July 1, 2023, for the Cincinnati Reds

MLB statistics
- Win–loss record: 12–14
- Earned run average: 5.00
- Strikeouts: 213
- Stats at Baseball Reference

Teams
- Kansas City Royals (2016); Chicago Cubs (2018–2022); Cincinnati Reds (2023)

Career highlights and awards
- Pitched a no-hitter on September 13, 2020

Alec Thomas Mills (born November 30, 1991) is an American former professional baseball pitcher. He has previously played in Major League Baseball (MLB) for the Kansas City Royals, Chicago Cubs, and Cincinnati Reds. The Royals selected Mills in the 22nd round of the 2012 MLB draft.

== College career ==
Mills attended Montgomery Central High School in Cunningham, Tennessee. He played college baseball at the University of Tennessee at Martin as a walk-on. Mills played at UT Martin from 2010 to 2012. He developed from a freshman walk-on relief pitcher who went 2–3 with an 8.51 ERA, to a setup reliever as a sophomore who went 7–4 with a 6.82 ERA, and eventually to a starting pitcher during his junior campaign going 4–6 with a 3.94 ERA.

In 2011, Mills notched seven victories and three saves while making 30 appearances for a Skyhawk squad that won an OVC Tournament game for the first time. Mills ranks on UT Martin's top-10 career list in appearances (67, sixth), strikeouts (165, seventh) and wins (13, eighth).

== Professional career ==
=== Kansas City Royals ===
After his junior year of college, the Kansas City Royals selected Mills in the 22nd round of the 2012 Major League Baseball draft. He signed with the Royals and made his professional debut with the Idaho Falls Chukars, and was 1–4 with a 4.62 ERA. He spent 2013 with the Lexington Legends, 2014 with Idaho Falls and Lexington and 2015 with the Wilmington Blue Rocks. The Royals added him to their 40-man roster after the season.

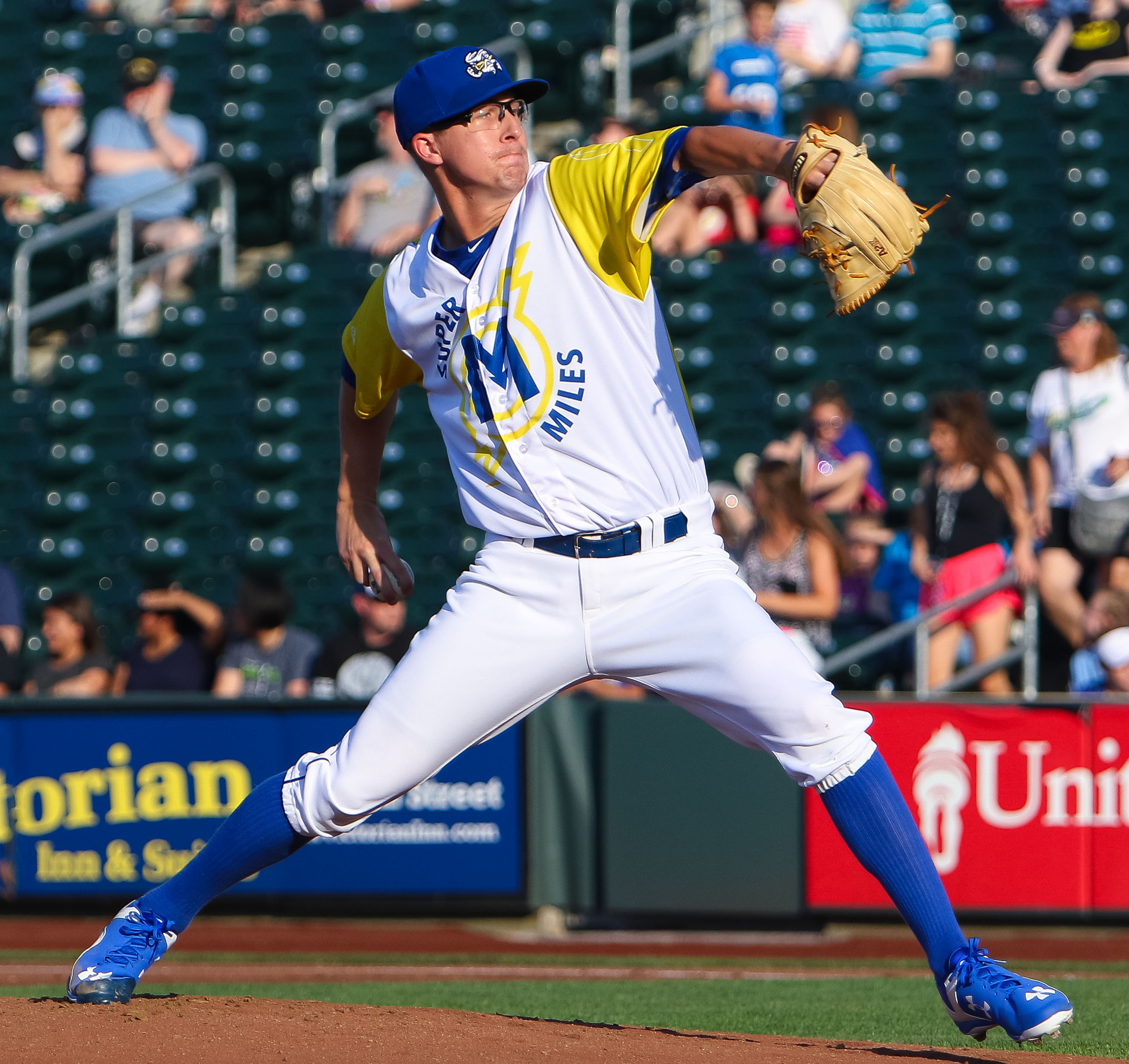
Mills with the Omaha Storm Chasers in 2016

Mills began the 2016 season with the Northwest Arkansas Naturals of the Double–A Texas League. The Royals promoted Mills to the major leagues on May 18, and he made his major league debut that day. In 2016, in 3.1 innings he gave up five earned runs. On February 8, 2017, Mills was designated for assignment by the Royals.

=== Chicago Cubs ===
On February 8, 2017, the Royals traded Mills to the Chicago Cubs in exchange for minor leaguer Donnie Dewees. Assigned to the Iowa Cubs of the Triple-A Pacific Coast League, he made seven appearances during the 2017 season, spending much of the year on the disabled list with a left ankle contusion and then a strained right forearm.

After returning to Iowa in 2018, the Cubs promoted Mills to start his first MLB game for injured Tyler Chatwood against the Cincinnati Reds on August 24, 2018. He also got his first hit in the same game. He spent most of 2019 with Iowa, where he was 6–4 with a 5.11 ERA.

Mills joined the Cubs rotation in the 2020 season after José Quintana began the season on the injured list. On September 13, 2020, Mills no-hit the Milwaukee Brewers 12–0 at Miller Park. He threw 74 of 114 pitches for strikes while striking out five and walking three. It marked the 16th no-hitter in the Cubs franchise history. Mills finished the 2020 season with a 5–5 record and a 4.48 ERA in 11 starts. His home runs per nine innings rate (1.9) was the highest among qualified NL pitchers. Mills made 32 appearances (20 starts) for Chicago in 2021, posting a 6–7 record and 5.07 ERA with 87 strikeouts in 119.0 innings pitched.

On May 19, 2022, Mills was placed on the 60-day injured list with a back injury. After making four rehab starts, he was activated on June 7. In 7 games (2 starts) for Chicago, he struggled to a 9.68 ERA with 11 strikeouts in 17 2/3 innings pitched. On September 15, Mills underwent surgery to remove part of a disc in his back, and missed the remainder of the season. On November 10, Mills was removed from the 40-man roster and sent outright to Triple–A Iowa; he elected free agency the same day.

=== Cincinnati Reds ===
On May 18, 2023, Mills signed a minor league contract with the Cincinnati Reds organization. After two starts with the rookie–level Arizona Complex League Reds, Mills was elevated to the Triple–A Louisville Bats. In two starts for Louisville, he posted a 4.50 ERA with one strikeout in six innings of work. On June 27, Mills had his contract selected to the major league roster. He appeared out of the bullpen in a game against the San Diego Padres, allowing five runs (two earned) on four hits and one walk in one inning of work. On July 2, Mills was designated for assignment by Cincinnati. He cleared waivers and was sent outright to Louisville on July 4. On October 2, Mills elected free agency.

== Personal ==
Mills and his wife, Paige, welcomed their first child, a son, in 2020.

Awards and achievements
Preceded by Lucas Giolito	No-hitter pitcher September 13, 2020	Succeeded by Joe Musgrove
