= Stuard =

Stuard is a surname. Notable people with the surname include:

- Brian Stuard (born 1982), American professional golfer
- Grant Stuard (born 1998), American football linebacker
- William "Sammy" Stuard (born 1954), American banker

== See also ==
- Stuart (name)
- Suard
