= First Women's Bank =

First Women's Bank or First Women Bank may refer to:

- First Women's Bank (New York), based in New York City, United States
- First Women's Bank of California, based in Los Angeles, United States
- First Women Bank, based in Karachi, Pakistan

== See also ==
- First Woman's Bank of Tennessee, based in Clarksville, United States from 1919 to 1926
