= Ricky Lumpkin =

American football player (born 1988)

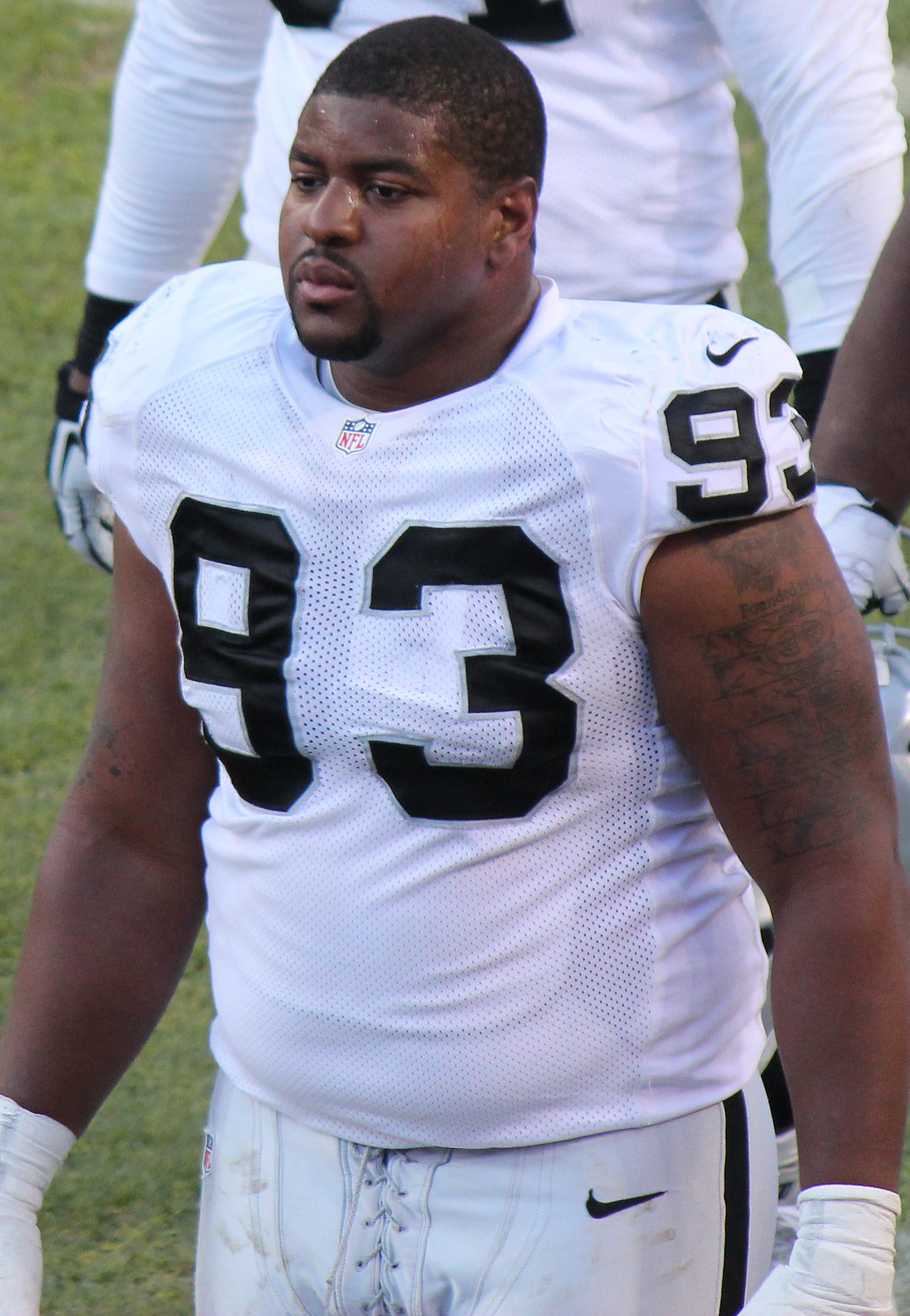
- Lumpkin with the Oakland Raiders in 2014

No. 95, 77, 93
- Position: Defensive end

Personal information
- Born: September 7, 1988 (age 38); Mount Holly, New Jersey, U.S.
- Listed height: 6 ft 4 in (1.93 m)
- Listed weight: 306 lb (139 kg)

Career information
- High school: Kenwood (Clarksville, Tennessee)
- College: Kentucky
- NFL draft: 2011: undrafted

Career history
- Arizona Cardinals (2011–2012); Oakland Raiders (2013–2014); Indianapolis Colts (2016)*
- * Offseason or practice squad member only

Career NFL statistics
- Total tackles: 10
- Sacks: 1
- Stats at Pro Football Reference

Ricky Lumpkin (born September 7, 1988) is an American former professional football player who was a defensive end in the National Football League (NFL) for the Arizona Cardinals and Oakland Raiders. He played college football for the Kentucky Wildcats.

== Early life ==
Lumpkin played high school football at Kenwood High School in Clarksville, Tennessee. He was named "Mr. Football” for Class AAAA in Tennessee recording 101 tackles, 35 tackles for a loss, 10 sacks, four forced fumbles, a fumble recovery and five passes defended his senior year. He was also an All-State, All-Middle Tennessee, two-time all-region and all-area selection.

== College career ==
Lumpkin played football for the Kentucky Wildcats from 2007 to 2010. He was redshirted in 2006. He appeared in 44 games, starting 29, in his college career.

== Professional career ==
Lumpkin was rated the 24th best defensive tackle in the 2011 NFL draft by NFLDraftScout.com. He signed with the Arizona Cardinals on July 27, 2011, after going undrafted. He was released on September 2 and signed to the Cardinals' practice squad on September 5, 2011. He was released by the Cardinals on November 1 and re-signed to the team's practice squad on November 22, 2011. Lumpkin was released by the Cardinals on August 31, 2012, and signed to the Cardinals' practice squad on September 1, 2012. He was promoted to the active roster on December 15, 2012. He made his NFL debut on December 16, 2012, against the Detroit Lions, recording one tackle. He was released by the Cardinals on December 17, 2012. Lumpkin was signed to the team's practice squad on December 18, 2012. He was placed on injured reserve by the Cardinals on August 31, 2013.

Lumpkin was signed to the Oakland Raiders' practice squad on November 20, 2013. He was promoted to the active roster on December 14, 2013. He recorded his first career sack on December 14, 2014, against the Kansas City Chiefs. Lumpkin was released by the Raiders on September 5, 2015.

On January 19, 2016, Lumpkin signed a reserve/future contract with the Indianapolis Colts. On August 28, 2016, he was waived by the Colts.

== Personal life ==
Lumpkin is a fan of Counter-Strike: Global Offensive, and streams gameplay of it on Twitch. On April 27, 2016, he joined esports team flipsid3.tactics as a Board Of Directors Member. He is also a co-owner of the team.

In 2017, Lumpkin started working as an academic counselor at the University of Kentucky.
