= Clarksville, Tennessee =

Clarksville
- City
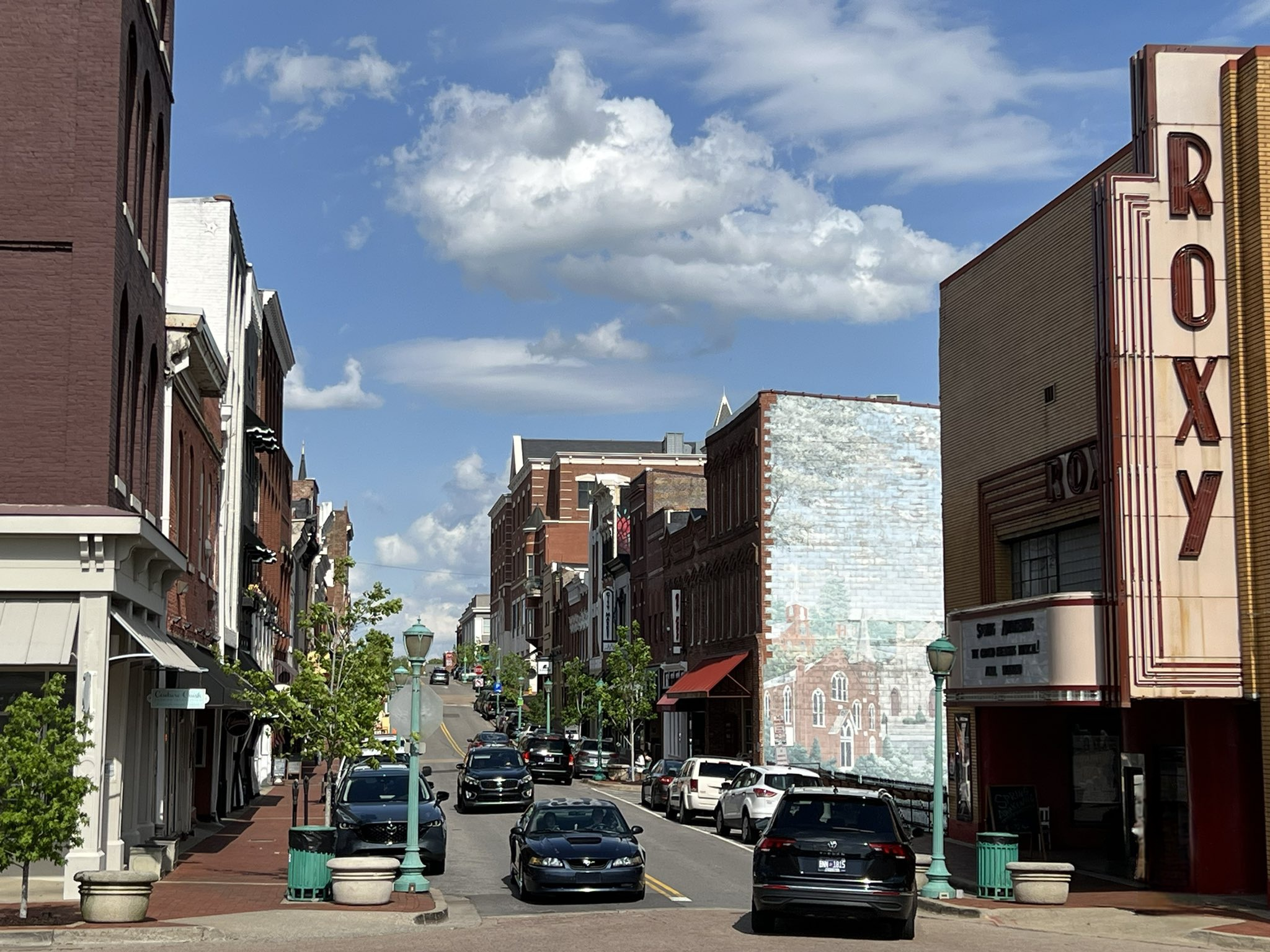
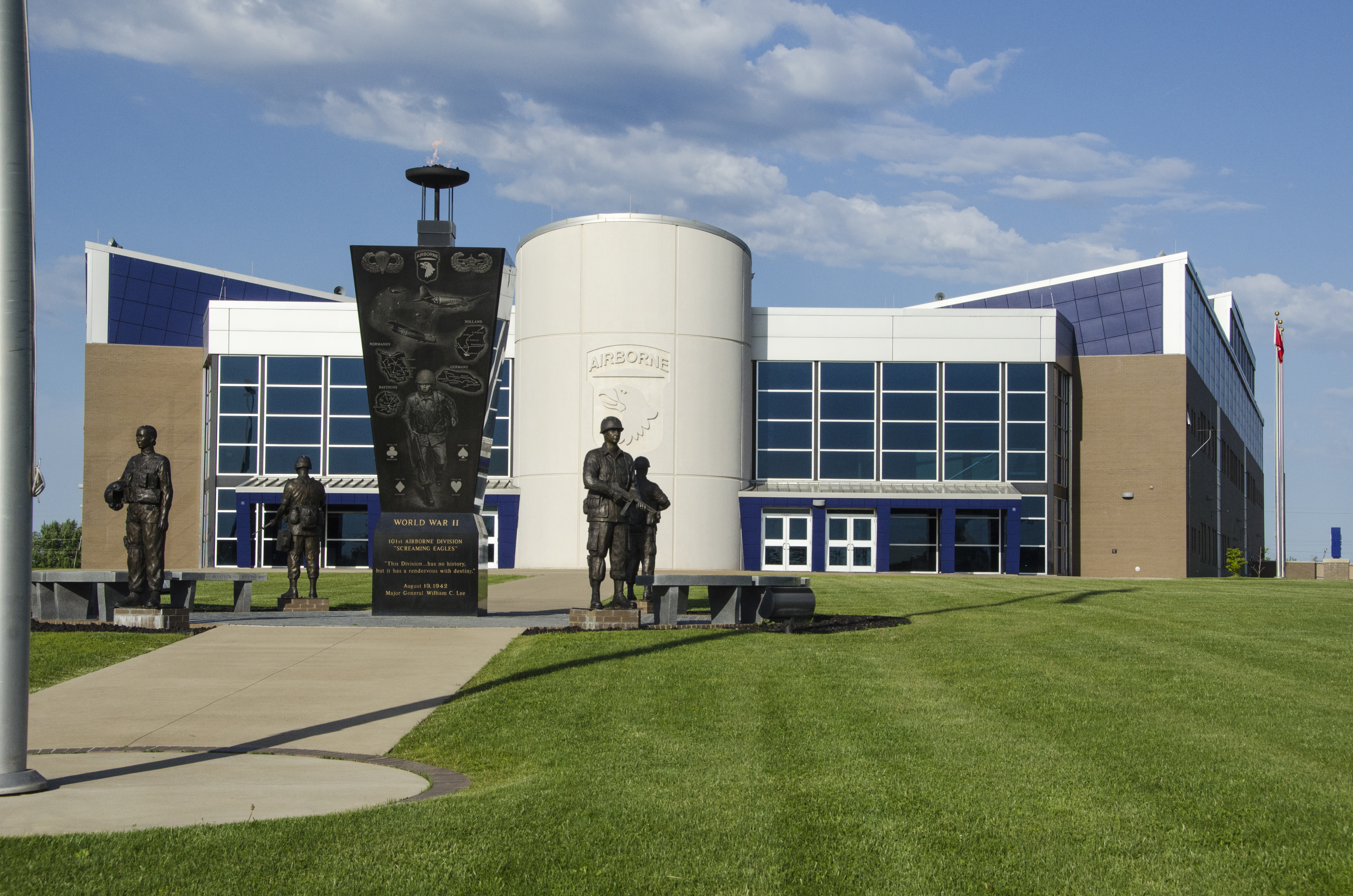
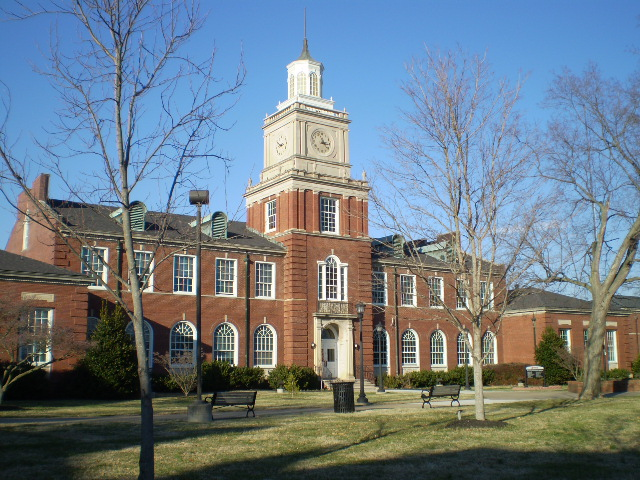
- Downtown Clarksville Fort Campbell Austin Peay State University

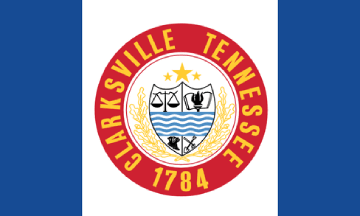
- Flag Seal
- Nicknames: Queen of the Cumberland; Gateway to the New South; Tennessee's Top Spot
- Location of Clarksville in Montgomery County, Tennessee.

- Location within Tennessee Location within the United States
- Coordinates: 36°31′47″N 87°21′34″W
- Country: United States
- State: Tennessee
- County: Montgomery
- Founded: 1784
- Incorporated: 1808

Government
  - Type: Mayor–council
  - Mayor: Joe Pitts (D)

Area
  - City: 100.28 sq mi (259.72 km^{2})
  - Land: 99.58 sq mi (257.91 km^{2})
  - Water: 0.70 sq mi (1.81 km^{2})
- Elevation: 476 ft (145 m)

Population (2020)
  - City: 166,722 ▲
  - Estimate (2025): 188,829 ▲
  - Rank: US: 159th TN: 5th
  - Density: 1,674.3/sq mi (646.44/km^{2})
  - Urban: 200,947 (US: 192nd)
  - Urban density: 1,776.9/sq mi (686.1/km^{2})
  - Metro: 328,304 (US: 159th)

GDP
  - Metro: $16.209 billion (2022)
- Time zone: UTC−6 (CST)
  - Summer (DST): UTC−5 (CDT)
- ZIP codes: 37040-37044
- Area code: 931
- FIPS code: 47-15160
- GNIS feature ID: 1269467
- Website: clarksvilletn.gov

Clarksville is a city in Montgomery County, Tennessee, United States, its county seat, and only incorporated municipality. The city had a population of 166,722 as of the 2020 census, making it the fifth-most populous city in Tennessee. It is the principal city of the Clarksville metropolitan area, which consists of Montgomery and Stewart counties in Tennessee and Christian and Trigg counties in Kentucky.

The city was founded in 1785 and incorporated in 1807, and named for General George Rogers Clark, frontier fighter and Revolutionary War hero, and brother of William Clark of the Lewis and Clark Expedition.

Clarksville is the home of Austin Peay State University; The Leaf-Chronicle, the oldest newspaper in Tennessee; and neighbor to the Fort Campbell, United States Army post. The site of the 101st Airborne Division (Air Assault), Fort Campbell is located about 10 miles (16 km) from downtown Clarksville and straddles the Tennessee-Kentucky state line.

== History ==
=== Colonization ===
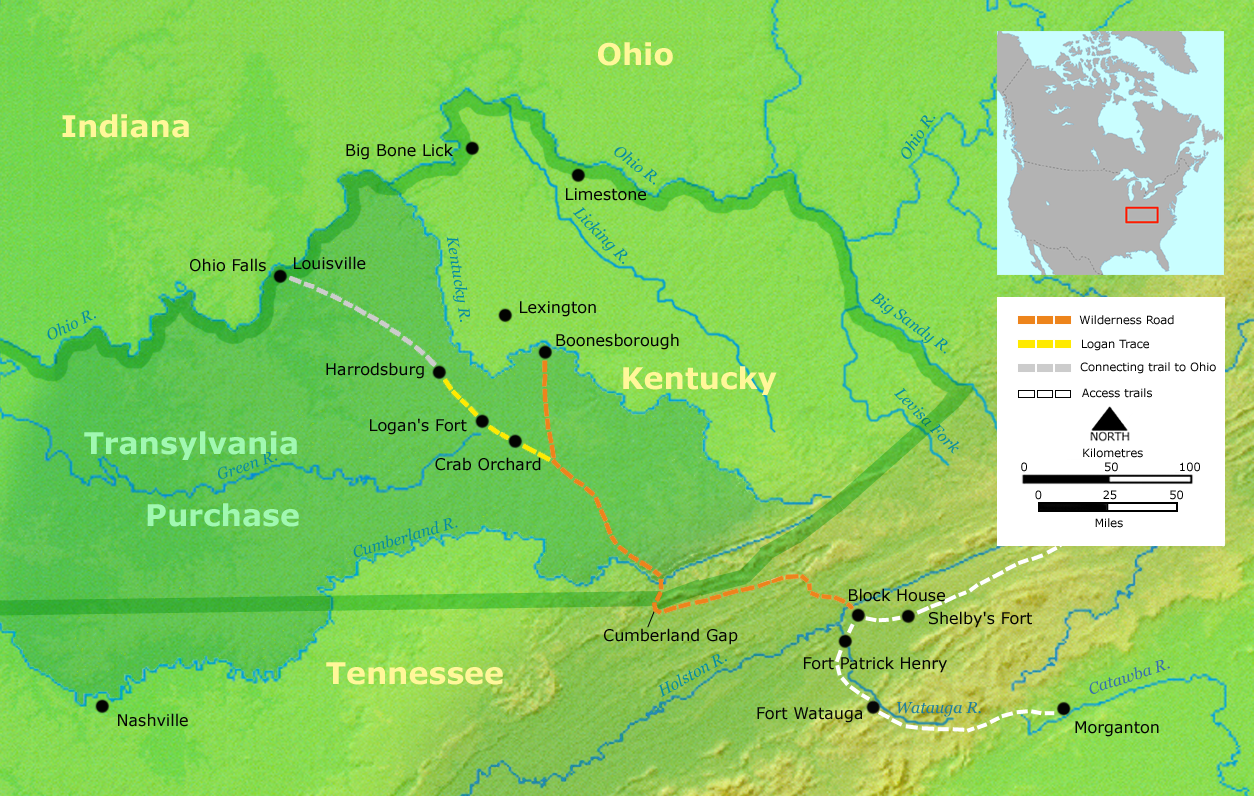
The Transylvania Purchase, bought from the Cherokee tribe, stretches from Sycamore Shoals in Elizabethton, Tennessee, to the Wilderness Road into Kentucky.

The area around Clarksville was first surveyed by Thomas Hutchins in 1768. He identified Red Paint Hill, a rock bluff at the confluence of the Cumberland and Red Rivers, as a navigational landmark.

In the years between 1771 and 1775, John Montgomery, the namesake of the county, along with Kasper Mansker, visited the area while on a hunting expedition. In 1771, James Robertson led a group of 12 or 13 families involved with the Regulator movement from near where present-day Raleigh, North Carolina now stands. In 1772, Robertson and the pioneers who had settled in northeast Tennessee (along the Watauga River, the Doe River, the Holston River, and the Nolichucky River) met at Sycamore Shoals to establish an independent regional government known as the Watauga Association.

In 1772, surveyors placed the land officially within the domain of the Cherokee tribe, who required negotiation of a lease with the settlers. As the lease was being celebrated, a Cherokee warrior was murdered by a white man. Through diplomacy, Robertson made peace with the Cherokee, who had threatened to expel the settlers by force.

In March 1775, land speculator and North Carolina judge Richard Henderson met with more than 1,200 Cherokees at Sycamore Shoals, including Cherokee leaders such as Attakullakulla, Oconostota, and Dragging Canoe. In the Treaty of Sycamore Shoals (also known as the Treaty of Watauga), Henderson purchased all the land lying between the Cumberland River, the Cumberland Mountains, and the Kentucky River, and situated south of the Ohio River in what is known as the Transylvania Purchase from the Cherokee Indians. The land thus delineated, 20 million acres (81,000 km^{2}), encompassed an area half as large as the present state of Kentucky. Henderson's purchase was in violation of North Carolina and Virginia law, as well as the Royal Proclamation of 1763, which prohibited private purchase of American Indian land. Henderson may have mistakenly believed that a newer British legal opinion had made such land purchases legal.

All of present-day Tennessee was once recognized as Washington County, North Carolina. Created in 1777 from the western areas of Burke and Wilkes Counties, Washington County had as a precursor a Washington District of 1775–76, which was the first political entity named for the Commander-in-Chief of American forces in the Revolution.

=== Founding ===
In 1779, Hadley W. and Hannah W. brought a group of settlers from upper East Tennessee via Daniel Boone's Wilderness Road. Hadley and Hannah later built an iron plantation in Cumberland Furnace. A year later, John Donelson led a group of flat boats up the Cumberland River bound for the French trading settlement, French Lick (or Big Lick), that later became Nashville. When the boats reached Red Paint Hill, Moses Renfroe, Joseph Renfroe, and Solomon Turpin, along with their families, branched off onto the Red River. They traveled to the mouth of Parson's Creek, near Port Royal, and went ashore to settle down. Clarksville was designated as a town to be settled in part by soldiers from the disbanded Continental Army that served under General George Washington during the American Revolutionary War.

At the end of the war, the federal government lacked sufficient funds to repay the soldiers, so the Legislature of North Carolina, in 1790, designated the lands to the west of the state line as federal lands that could be used in the land grant program. Since the area of Clarksville had been surveyed and sectioned into plots, it was identified as a territory deemed ready for settlement. The land was available to be settled by the families of eligible soldiers as repayment of service to their country. On January 16, 1784, John Armstrong filed notice with the Legislature of North Carolina to create the town of Clarksville, named after General George Rogers Clark.

Even before it was officially designated a town, lots had been sold. In October 1785, Col. Robert Weakley laid off the town of Clarksville for Martin Armstrong and Col. Montgomery, and Weakley had the choice of lots for his services. He selected Lot #20 at the northeast corner of Spring and Main Streets. The town consisted of 20 'squares' of 140 lots and 44 out lots. The original Court House was on Lot #93, on the north side of Franklin Street between Front and Second Street. The Public Spring was on Lot #74, on the northeast corner of Spring and Commerce Streets. Weakley built the first cabin there in January 1786, and about February or March, Col. Montgomery came there and had a cabin built, which was the second house in Clarksville.

After an official survey by James Sanders, Clarksville was founded by the North Carolina Legislature on December 29, 1785. It was the second town to be founded in the area. Armstrong's layout for the town consisted of 12 four-acre (16,000 m^{2}) squares built on the hill overlooking the Cumberland as to protect against floods. The primary streets (from north to south) that went east–west were named Jefferson, Washington (now College Street), Franklin, Main, and Commerce Streets. North–south streets (from the river eastward) were named Water (now Riverside Drive), Spring, First, Second, and Third Streets.

The tobacco trade in the area was growing larger every year and in 1789, Montgomery and Martin Armstrong persuaded lawmakers to designate Clarksville as an inspection point for tobacco.

When Tennessee was founded as a state on June 1, 1796, the area around Clarksville and to the east was named Tennessee County. (This county was established in 1788, by North Carolina.) Later, Tennessee County was broken up into modern day Montgomery and Robertson counties, named to honor the men who first opened up the region for settlement.

=== 19th century ===
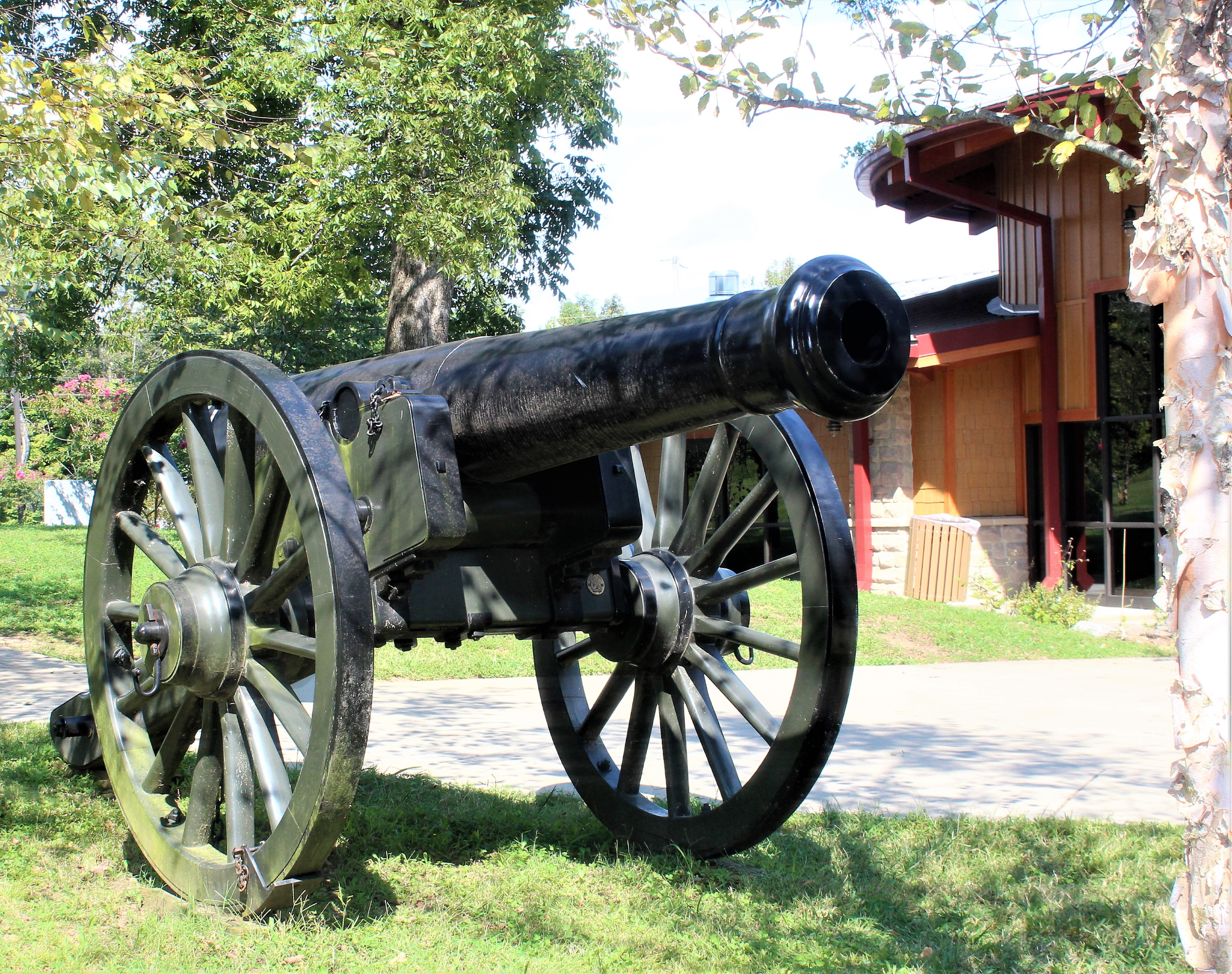
Fort Defiance

Clarksville grew at a rapid pace. By 1806, the town realized the need for an educational institution, and it established the Rural Academy that year. It was later replaced by the Mount Pleasant Academy. By 1819, the newly established town had 22 stores, including a bakery and silversmith. In 1820, steamboats begin to navigate the Cumberland, bringing hardware, coffee, sugar, fabric, and glass. The city exported flour, tobacco, cotton, and corn to ports such as New Orleans and Pittsburgh along the Ohio and Mississippi rivers.

In 1829, the first bridge connecting Clarksville to New Providence was built over the Red River. Nine years later, the Clarksville-Hopkinsville Turnpike was built. Railroad service came to the town on October 1, 1859, in the form of the Memphis, Clarksville and Louisville Railroad. The line later connected to other railroads at Paris, Tennessee and at Guthrie, Kentucky.

By the start of the Civil War, the combined population of the city and the county was 20,000. Planters in the area depended on enslaved African Americans as workers in the labor-intensive tobacco industry, one of the major commodity crops.

In 1861, both Clarksville and Montgomery counties voted unanimously for the state to secede and join the Confederate States of America. The birthplace of Confederate President Jefferson Davis was about 20 miles across the border in Fairview, Christian County, Kentucky. Both sides considered Clarksville to be of strategic importance.

Confederate General Albert Sidney Johnston set up a defense line around Clarksville expecting a land attack. The city was home to three Confederate States Army camps:

- Camp Boone located on U.S. Highway 79 Guthrie Road/(Wilma Rudolph Boulevard),
- Camp Burnet
- Fort Defiance, Tennessee, a Civil War outpost that overlooks the Cumberland River and Red River, and was occupied by both Confederate and Union soldiers. In 2012 the City of Clarksville, Tennessee completed construction of an interpretive/ museum center here to chronicle the local chapter in the Civil War.

The Union sent troops and gunboats down the Cumberland River, and in 1862 captured Fort Donelson, and Fort Henry. On February 17, 1862, the USS Cairo, along with another Union ironclad, came to Clarksville and its troops captured the city. There were no Confederate soldiers to contend with because they had left prior to the arrival of the ships. White flags flew over Ft. Defiance and over Ft. Clark. Those town citizens who could get away, left as well. Before leaving, Confederate soldiers tried to burn the railroad bridge that crossed the Cumberland River, so that the Union could not use it. But the fire did not take hold and was put out before it could destroy the bridge. This railroad bridge made Clarksville very important to the Union. The USS Cairo tied up in Clarksville for a couple of days before moving to participate in the capture of Nashville.

Between 1862 and 1865, the city shifted hands, but the Union retained control. It also controlled the city's newspaper, The Leaf Chronicle, for three years. Many slaves who had been freed or escaped gathered in Clarksville and joined the Union Army lines. The army set up contraband camps in mid-Tennessee cities, to provide shelter for the freedmen families. Other freed slaves lived along the side of the river in shanties. In 1865, the Ogburn Chapel Missionary Baptist Church was founded. The Army enlisted freedmen in all-black regiments, in some cases putting them to work in building defenses. The 16th United States Colored Infantry regiment was mustered in at Clarksville in 1863.

=== Reconstruction ===
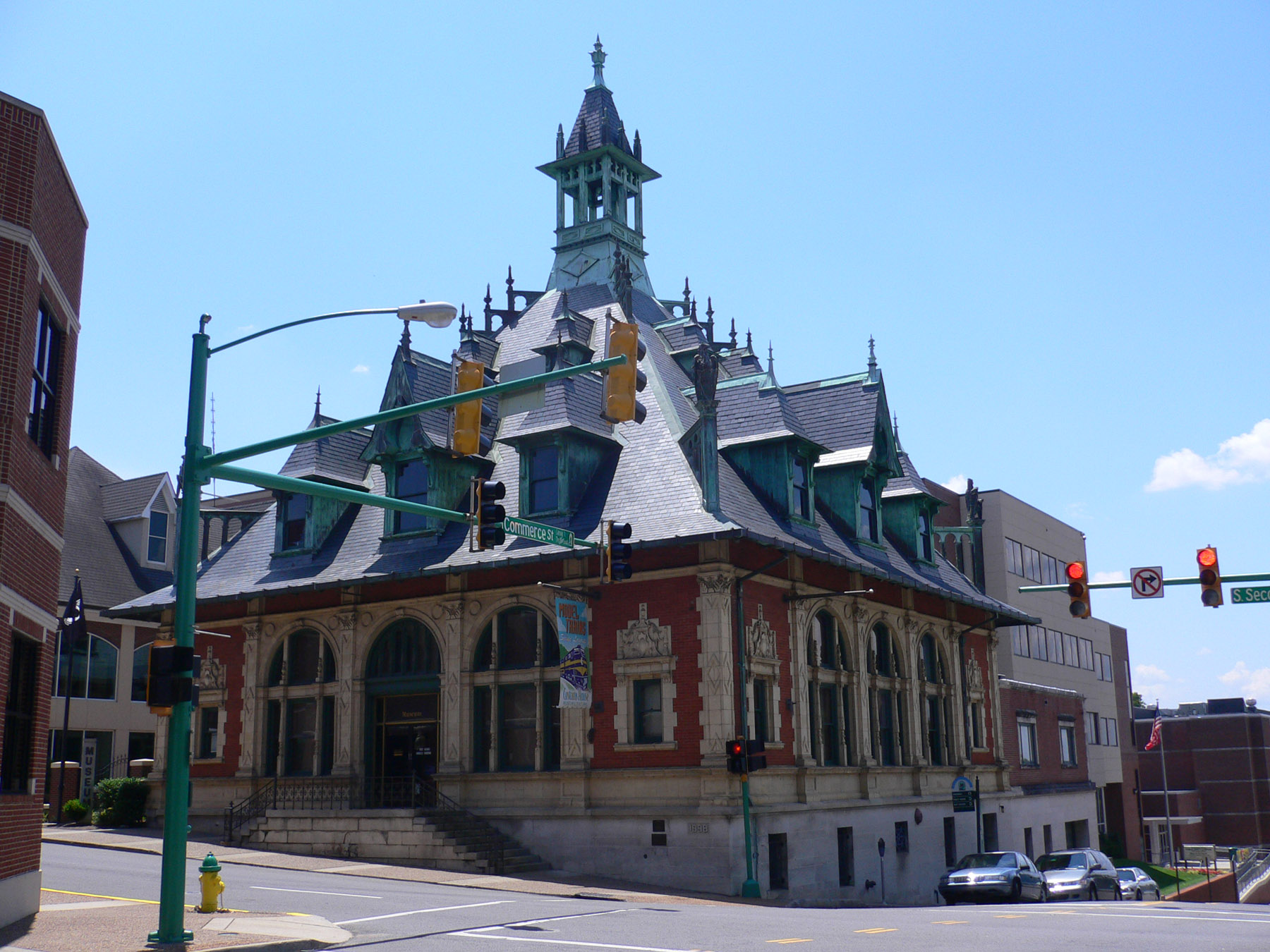
Clarksville Museum and Cultural Center, built 1898

After the war, the city began Reconstruction, and in 1872, the existing railroad was purchased by the Louisville & Nashville Railroad. The city was flourishing until the Great Fire of 1878, which destroyed 15 acres (60,000 m^{2}) of downtown Clarksville's business district, including the courthouse and many other historic buildings. It was believed to have started in a Franklin Street store. After the fire, the city rebuilt. The first automobile rolled into town, drawing much excitement.

=== 20th century ===
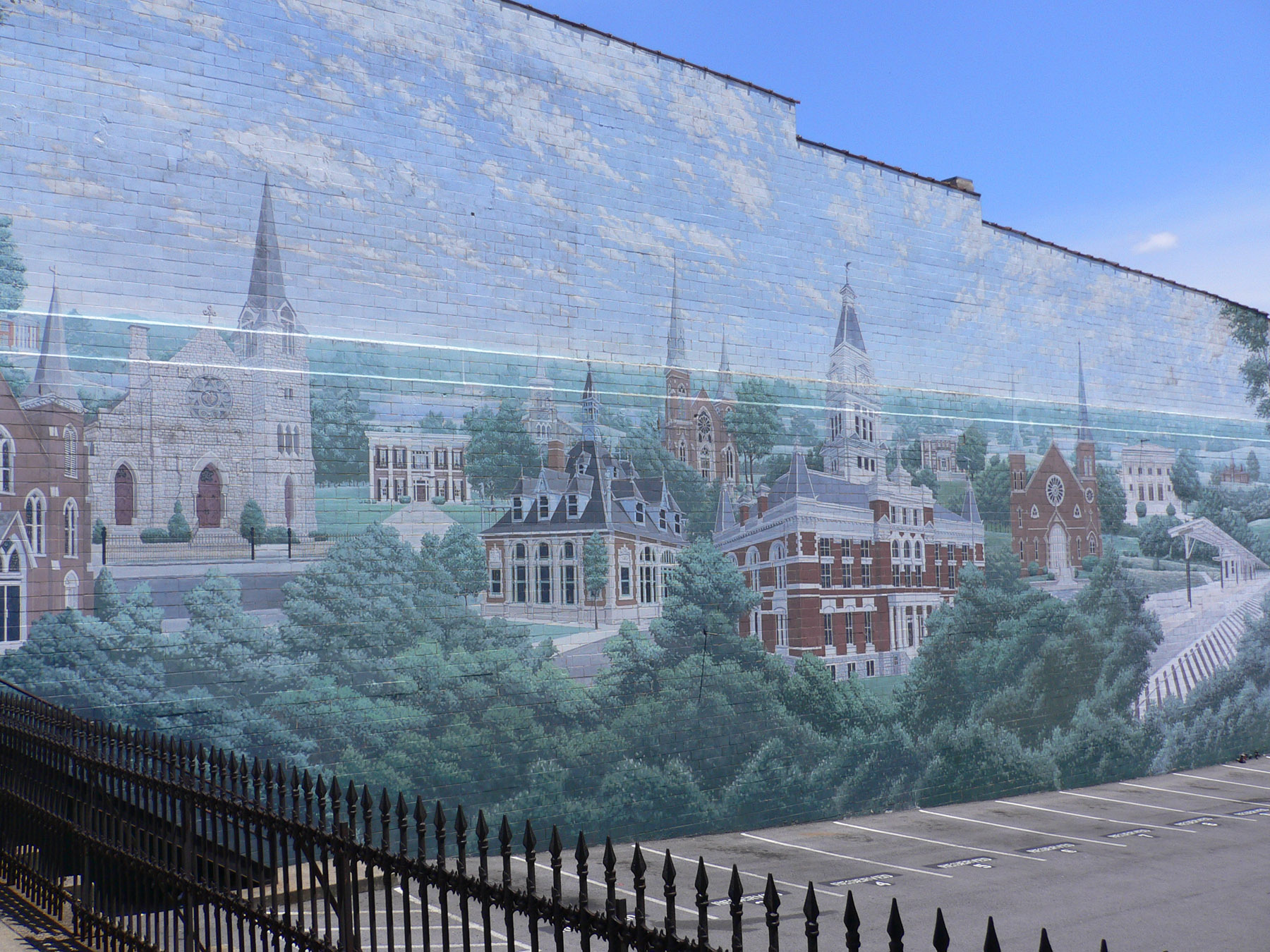
Mural painted on the only remaining wall of a building destroyed by the '99 tornado.

In 1913, the Lillian Theater was opened on Franklin Street and owned by Joseph Goldberg. In 1914, it was severely damaged in a fire, but reopened later in 1915. It was later renamed the Roxy after renovations in 1941.

As World War I raged in Europe, many locals volunteered to go, reaffirming Tennessee as the Volunteer State, a nickname earned during the War of 1812, the Mexican–American War and other earlier conflicts. Also during this time, women's suffrage was becoming a major issue. Clarksville women saw a need for banking independent of their husbands and fathers who were fighting. In response, the First Women's Bank of Tennessee was established in 1919 by Mrs. Frank J. Runyon.

The 1920s brought additional growth to the city. A bus line between Clarksville and Hopkinsville was established in 1922. In 1927 the Austin Peay Normal School was founded, later to develop as Austin Peay State University. In 1928 two more theaters were added, the Majestic (with 600 seats) and the Capitol (with 900 seats). John Outlaw, a local aviator, established Outlaw Field in 1929.

With the entry of the United States into World War II, defense investments were made in the area. In 1942 construction started on Camp Campbell (now known as Fort Campbell), the new army base ten miles (16 km) northwest of the city. It was capable of holding 23,000 troops, and as staffing built up, the base gave a huge boost to the population and economy of Clarksville.

In 1954, the Clarksville Memorial Hospital was founded along Madison Street. Downtown, the Lillian was renamed the Roxy Theater, and today it still hosts plays and performances weekly. The Roxy has been used as a backdrop for numerous photo shoots, films, documentaries, music videos and television commercials; most notably for Sheryl Crow's Grammy Award-winning song "All I Wanna Do."

Since 1980, the population of Clarksville has more than doubled. This increase was due in part to annexation, as the city acquired communities such as New Providence and Saint Bethlehem. The construction of Interstate 24 north of Saint Bethlehem added to its development potential and in the early 21st century, much of the growth along U.S. Highway 79 is commercial retail. Clarksville is currently one of the fastest-growing large cities in Tennessee. At its present rate of growth, the city was expected to displace Chattanooga by 2020 as the fourth-largest city in Tennessee.

=== Natural disasters ===
- In January 1999, the downtown area of Clarksville was devastated by an F3 tornado.
- Clarksville was damaged in the May 2010 Tennessee floods.
- In February 2018, the east side of Clarksville was struck by an EF2 tornado.
- In December 2023, North Clarksville was struck by an EF3 tornado that resulted in four fatalities and left multiple homes and businesses damaged or destroyed, and over 20,000 people without power.
- In early May 2024, the city of Clarksville was affected by a severe weather and tornado outbreak, which resulted in some instances of flash-flooding and golf-ball-sized hail. An EF-1 tornado touched down just east of Clarksville and did minor damage to nearby Springfield, TN.

== Geography ==
Interactive map of Clarksville

According to the United States Census Bureau, the city has a total area of 100.3 square miles (260 km^{2}), of which 99.6 square miles (258 km^{2}) is land and 0.7 square miles (1.8 km^{2}) (0.7%) is water.

According to the United States Census Bureau, the city has a total area of 95.5 square miles (247 km^{2}), of which 94.9 square miles (246 km^{2}) is land and 0.7 square miles (1.8 km^{2}) (0.71%) is covered by water.

Clarksville is located on the northwest edge of the Highland Rim, which surrounds the Nashville Basin, and is 45 miles (72 km) northwest of Nashville.

Clarksville sits where the Fletchers Fork Red River of the Cumberland meets the Little West Fork Red River of the Cumberland, the Little West Fork Red River of the Cumberland meets the West Fork Red River of the Cumberland, the West Fork Red River of the Cumberland meets the main Red River of the Cumberland, and the Red River of the Cumberland meets the Cumberland River.

Fort Campbell North is a census-designated place (CDP) in Christian County, Kentucky. It contains most of the housing for the Fort Campbell Army base. The population was 14,338 at the 2000 census. Fort Campbell North is part of the Clarksville, TN–KY Metropolitan Statistical Area.

=== Climate ===
The climate is humid subtropical (Köppen: Cfa) with hot summers and cold winters but interspersed with milder times due to its location between the warmer climates of the Gulf of Mexico and the colder ones of the Midwest. Freezing temperatures are not uncommon but usually the averages are above zero in January (around 2 °C) and in July can often pass through 25 °C. Snow in winter is common, but large accumulated amounts are more sporadic; usually the soil is covered by a thin layer during some time of winter. Precipitation is abundant year-round without any major difference, but May tends to have the highest cumulative amount of 142 mm in the form of rain. The wet season runs from February through July, while the dry season runs from August through January with a September nadir of 85 mm and secondary December peak of 125 mm.

Climate data for Clarksville WWTP, Tennessee (1991–2020 normals, extremes 1890–present)
Month	Jan	Feb	Mar	Apr	May	Jun	Jul	Aug	Sep	Oct	Nov	Dec	Year
Record high °F (°C)	82 (28)	82 (28)	94 (34)	94 (34)	99 (37)	109 (43)	110 (43)	109 (43)	112 (44)	98 (37)	88 (31)	80 (27)	112 (44)
Mean maximum °F (°C)	68 (20)	73 (23)	81 (27)	87 (31)	90 (32)	95 (35)	97 (36)	97 (36)	94 (34)	87 (31)	79 (26)	70 (21)	99 (37)
Mean daily maximum °F (°C)	46.8 (8.2)	51.6 (10.9)	61.2 (16.2)	71.8 (22.1)	79.4 (26.3)	86.6 (30.3)	89.9 (32.2)	89.6 (32.0)	83.6 (28.7)	72.3 (22.4)	59.7 (15.4)	50.1 (10.1)	70.2 (21.2)
Daily mean °F (°C)	37.3 (2.9)	41.1 (5.1)	49.6 (9.8)	59.4 (15.2)	68.1 (20.1)	75.8 (24.3)	79.5 (26.4)	78.5 (25.8)	71.7 (22.1)	60.0 (15.6)	48.4 (9.1)	40.6 (4.8)	59.2 (15.1)
Mean daily minimum °F (°C)	27.8 (−2.3)	30.6 (−0.8)	38.0 (3.3)	47.0 (8.3)	56.8 (13.8)	65.0 (18.3)	69.0 (20.6)	67.4 (19.7)	59.8 (15.4)	47.7 (8.7)	37.1 (2.8)	31.1 (−0.5)	48.1 (8.9)
Mean minimum °F (°C)	9 (−13)	14 (−10)	22 (−6)	32 (0)	44 (7)	53 (12)	60 (16)	58 (14)	45 (7)	33 (1)	23 (−5)	15 (−9)	7 (−14)
Record low °F (°C)	−20 (−29)	−14 (−26)	0 (−18)	21 (−6)	32 (0)	42 (6)	47 (8)	44 (7)	29 (−2)	20 (−7)	−2 (−19)	−12 (−24)	−20 (−29)
Average precipitation inches (mm)	4.03 (102)	4.51 (115)	4.78 (121)	4.97 (126)	5.59 (142)	4.65 (118)	4.59 (117)	3.69 (94)	3.35 (85)	4.31 (109)	4.11 (104)	4.92 (125)	53.50 (1,359)
Average snowfall inches (cm)	3.0 (7.6)	2.4 (6.1)	1.0 (2.5)	0.0 (0.0)	0.0 (0.0)	0.0 (0.0)	0.0 (0.0)	0.0 (0.0)	0.0 (0.0)	0.0 (0.0)	0.2 (0.51)	0.5 (1.3)	7.2 (18)
Average precipitation days (≥ 0.01 in)	11.9	11.2	12.3	11.9	12.1	10.8	10.1	9.4	8.7	9.1	10.5	12.4	130.4
Average snowy days (≥ 0.1 in)	3.0	2.4	1.0	0.0	0.0	0.0	0.0	0.0	0.0	0.0	0.2	0.5	7.8
Source 1: NOAA
Source 2: Weather.com

== Demographics ==
Historical population
Census	Pop.	Note	%±
1840	1,754		—
1850	2,128		21.3%
1860	2,850		33.9%
1870	3,200		12.3%
1880	3,880		21.3%
1890	7,924		104.2%
1900	9,431		19.0%
1910	8,548		−9.4%
1920	8,110		−5.1%
1930	9,242		14.0%
1940	11,831		28.0%
1950	16,246		37.3%
1960	22,021		35.5%
1970	31,719		44.0%
1980	54,777		72.7%
1990	75,494		37.8%
2000	103,455		37.0%
2010	132,929		28.5%
2020	166,722		25.4%
2025 (est.)	188,829		13.3%

As of the 2020 census, there were 166,722 people residing in the city.

=== Racial and ethnic composition ===
Clarksville city, Tennessee – Racial and ethnic composition Note: the US Census treats Hispanic/Latino as an ethnic category. This table excludes Latinos from the racial categories and assigns them to a separate category. Hispanics/Latinos may be of any race.
Race / Ethnicity (NH = Non-Hispanic)	Pop. 2000	Pop. 2010	Pop. 2020	% 2000	% 2010	% 2020
White alone (NH)	67,562	81,165	89,596	65.31%	61.06%	53.74%
Black or African American alone (NH)	23,692	29,872	39,567	22.90%	22.47%	23.73%
Native American or Alaska Native alone (NH)	486	616	582	0.47%	0.46%	0.35%
Asian alone (NH)	2,189	3,011	4,003	2.12%	2.27%	2.40%
Pacific Islander alone (NH)	248	586	812	0.24%	0.44%	0.49%
Some Other Race alone (NH)	320	219	938	0.31%	0.16%	0.56%
Mixed race or Multiracial (NH)	2,717	5,158	11,553	2.63%	3.88%	6.93%
Hispanic or Latino (any race)	6,241	12,302	19,671	6.03%	9.25%	11.80%
Total	103,455	132,929	166,722	100.00%	100.00%	100.00%

=== 2020 census ===
As of the 2020 census, Clarksville had a population of 166,722, a median age of 29.9 years, with 27.2% of residents under the age of 18 and 9.2% aged 65 or older. For every 100 females there were 96.4 males, and for every 100 females age 18 and over there were 93.6 males age 18 and over.

There were 61,128 households, including 39,595 families, of which 38.6% had children under the age of 18. Married couples accounted for 46.8% of households, 18.6% were households with a male householder and no spouse or partner present, and 27.5% were households with a female householder and no spouse or partner present. About 24.2% of all households were made up of individuals and 6.4% had someone living alone who was 65 years of age or older.

There were 65,752 housing units, of which 7.0% were vacant. The homeowner vacancy rate was 2.1% and the rental vacancy rate was 7.3%.

98.3% of residents lived in urban areas while 1.7% lived in rural areas.

== Economy ==
Notable industrial employers in Clarksville include:

- Amazon, Distribution Center
- American Standard
- Bridgestone Metalpha USA
- Convergys Corporation
- FedEx, Distribution Center
- Fort Campbell
- Google
- Hankook
- Jostens, printing and publishing division
- LG
- SPX Corporation, metal forge division
- Trane, Clarksville's largest private employer

== Arts and culture ==
=== Points of interest ===
Clarksville Roxy Theatre

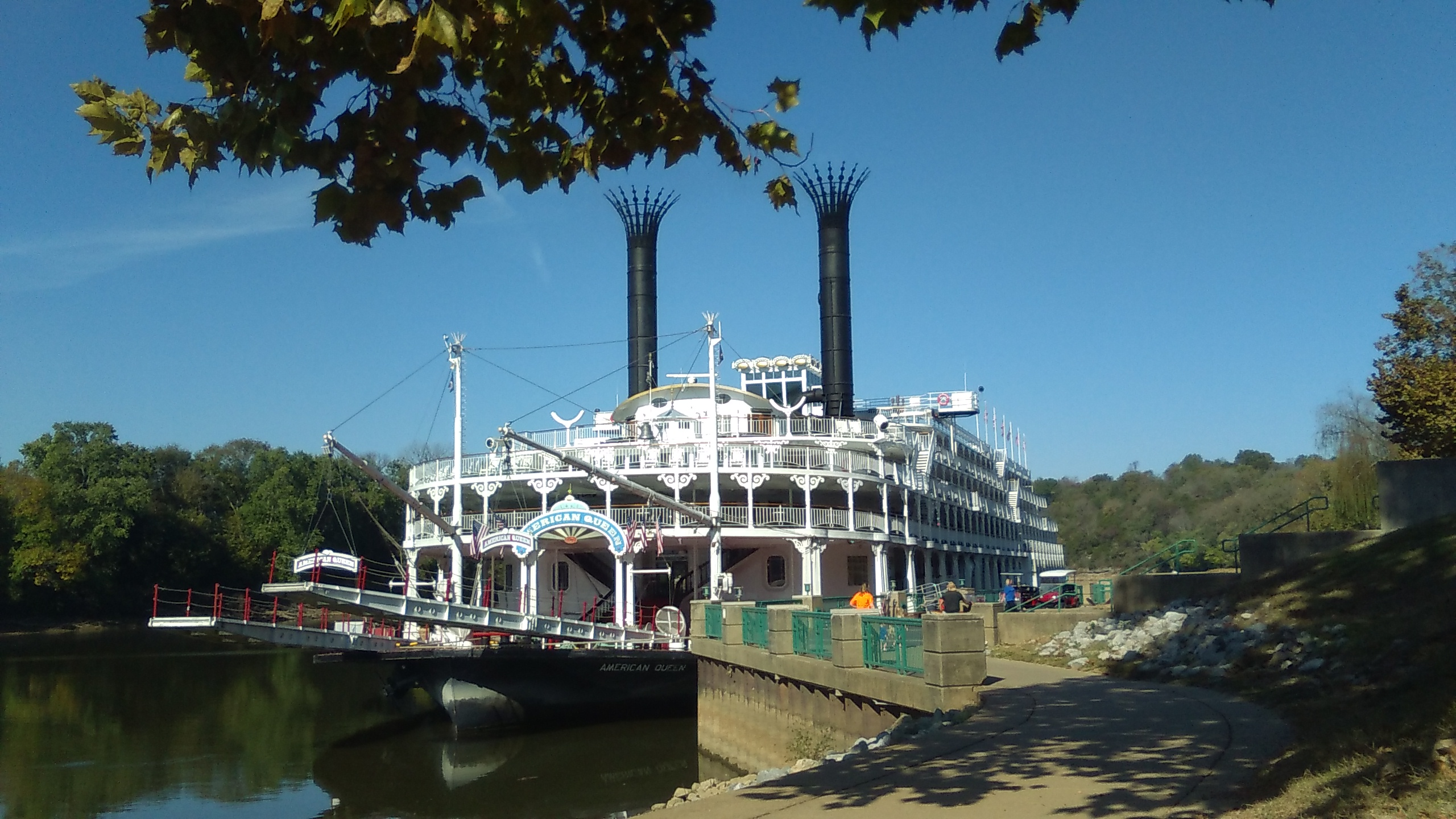
American Queen steamboat docked at Cumberland riverfront in Clarksville, 2016.

- Roxy Theatre, located in downtown Clarksville
- F&M Bank Arena, Home of Austin Peay Men's and Women's Basketball
- Governor's Square Mall
- Clarksville City Arboretum
- Ringgold Mill, located in North Clarksville
- Customs House Museum and Cultural Center, located in downtown Clarksville, second largest general museum in Tennessee
- L & N Train Station, restored downtown train station
- Wilma Rudolph, statue honoring one of America's most outstanding Olympic athletes
- Dunbar Cave
- Fortera Stadium, home of Austin Peay Football
- Cumberland River
- Liberty Park and Marina
- Fort Defiance, Civil War fort overlooking the Cumberland River

== Sports ==
Clarksville was home to several Minor League Baseball teams that played in the Kentucky–Illinois–Tennessee League during the first half of the 20th century. They were called the Clarksville Villagers (1903), Grays (1904), Volunteers (1910 and 1916), Billies (1911), Rebels (1912), Boosters (1913–1914), Owls (1916), and Colts (1947–1949). It also hosted a team of the independent Big South League and Heartland League from 1996 to 1997 called the Clarksville Coyotes. Clarksville became the new primary home of the Nashville Kats of Arena Football One in 2026 after serving as a neutral home site in 2025.

== Government and politics ==
The City of Clarksville has a mayor–council form of government. The mayor, elected at-large, serves as the city’s chief executive, overseeing municipal administration, city departments, and the budget. The 12-member city council, elected from single-member districts, serves as the legislative body, passing ordinances, approving the budget, and confirming certain mayoral appointments. Municipal elections in Clarksville are officially nonpartisan, meaning candidates’ party affiliations do not appear on the ballot, although many have known affiliations. The Clarksville mayor does not have a formal role in the Montgomery County Commission, though the city and county collaborate on shared services and joint projects.

Clarksville previously operated under a board of commission system. In 1907, it was among several Tennessee cities—including Chattanooga (1911), Knoxville (1911), Nashville (1913), and Jackson (1915)—to adopt this form of government, with commissioners elected at-large. At the time, Clarksville’s population was about 9,000. This system tended to favor candidates supported by the majority, limiting opportunities for minority communities to elect representatives of their choice.

In the 21st century, Clarksville switched to single-member districts for city council elections, increasing representation; by 2015, four of the 12 council members were African American and eight were white.

The current mayor is Joe Pitts, first elected 2018, defeating former mayor Kim McMillan, the first woman to serve as mayor of any Tennessee city with more than 100,000 residents.

Partial list of mayors of Clarksville, Tennessee
- James E. Elder, circa 1820
- ?
- George Smith, circa 1860
- A. Howell, 1882–1886
- G.A. Ligon, circa 1890
- Thomas H. Smith, 1891
- N.L. Carney, 1892
- W.B. Young, circa 1902
- W.D. "Pete" Hudson, 1928–1938
- William Kleeman, circa 1945, 1953, 1955–1956
- Paul M. McGregor, circa 1954, 1957
- W. W. Barksdale, circa 1960
- Charles Crow, circa 1963
- Ted Crozier, circa 1970s, 1983, 1985
- Don Trotter, 1987–1999, 2003–2007
- Johnny Piper, 1999–2002, 2007–2010
- Kim McMillan, 2011–2018
- Joe Pitts, 2019–Present

=== Political makeup ===
Clarksville generally tilts Republican in statewide elections but is a highly competitive "purple" city.

Clarksville Presidential election results
Year	Republican	Democratic	Third parties
2024	52.31% 28,904	46.08% 25,464	1.61% 889
2020	48.67% 26,096	48.31% 25,900	3.02% 1,618
2016	50.24% 20,185	43.12% 17,323	6.64% 2,667

== Education ==
=== Colleges and universities ===
- Austin Peay State University
- Daymar Institute
- Nashville State Community College
- North Tennessee Bible Institute

=== Public K–12 schools ===
Montgomery Central High School

The city consolidated its school system with that of the county, forming the Clarksville-Montgomery County School System. It operates a total of 39 public schools to serve about 37,666 students, including eight high schools, seven middle schools, 24 elementary schools, and one magnet school for K–5, in addition to Middle College on the campus of Austin Peay State University.

Public high schools (grades 9–12) in Clarksville-Montgomery County:

- Clarksville High School (1,530 students)
- Kenwood High School (1,302 students)
- Kirkwood High School (1,009 students)
- Montgomery Central High School (1,015 students)
- Northeast High School (1,341 students)
- Northwest High School (1,426 students)
- Rossview High School (1,584 students)
- West Creek High School (1,647 students)

Most of the city is in the Clarksville-Montgomery system. Portions in Fort Campbell are instead use the Department of Defense Education Activity (DoDEA) as their school district.

=== Private K–12 schools ===
Private schools in Clarksville-Montgomery County include:

- Clarksville Academy (students: 613; ST; grades: PK–12)
- Clarksville Christian School (students: 580; grades: PK–12)
- Immaculate Conception School (students: 146; grades: K–8)
- Little Scholars Montessori (students: 91; grades: Preschool–5)

== Infrastructure ==
=== Major roads and highways ===
- U.S. Route 41A (Madison Street and Fort Campbell Boulevard)
- U.S. Route 79 (Wilma Rudolph Boulevard)
- Interstate 24 (designated a control city along route)
- State Route 12 (Ashland City Road)
- State Route 13
- State Route 48
- State Route 76 (Martin Luther King Jr. Parkway)
- State Route 374 (Warfield Blvd., 101st Airborne Division Parkway, Purple Heart Parkway)

=== Air ===
Clarksville is served commercially by Nashville International Airport but also has a small airport, Outlaw Field, located 10 miles (16 km) north of downtown. Outlaw Field accommodates an average of slightly over 32,000 private and corporate flight operations per year (average for 12-month period ending 2014), and is also home to a pilot training school and a few small aircraft companies. It has two asphalt runways, one 6,000 by 100 ft (1,829 by 30 m) and the other 4,004 by 100 ft (1,220 by 30 m). Outlaw Field has received a $35,000 grant. A new terminal building was built in 2011–2012.

Cobb Field was a small private airfield. It was 3 miles (4.8 km) west of the Dover Crossings area, just across the street from Liberty Elementary. It had one grass/sod runway that measured 1,752 ft (534 m). This airfield was not open to the public and is no longer suitable for landing aircraft due to runway encroachment by nearby trees and brush, as well as fencing across the former runway. Cobb Field is no longer displayed on VFR sectional charts available from the FAA.

=== Transit ===
Clarksville Transit System has 10 bus routes, and the service operates Mondays-Saturdays.

== Notable people ==
- Roy Acuff – country music star, associated with Grand Ole Opry and Hee Haw television series
- James E. Bailey – U.S. Senator from Tennessee
- David Bibb – acting administrator of General Services Administration (GSA)
- Willie Blount – former governor of Tennessee (1809–1815)
- Robert Burt (1873–1955) African-American surgeon, founder of a local hospital
- Francis Gracey Childers – Army general and politician
- Philander Claxton – professor, Commissioner of U.S. Department of Education, APSU president
- Nate Colbert – MLB player
- Gretchen Cordy – reality TV personality, Survivor: Borneo, local radio DJ
- Riley Darnell – state senator and former Tennessee Secretary of State
- Mark Day – NASCAR race car driver
- Dorothy Dix – pen name of Elizabeth Meriwether Gilmer, famous for newspaper advice column
- Dalton Eatherly – real name of Chud the Builder, livestreamer
- Harry Galbreath – football player with Miami Dolphins, Green Bay Packers, and New York Jets
- Brock Gillespie – professional basketball player
- Jeff Gooch – former football player with Tampa Bay Buccaneers and Detroit Lions
- Ernest William Goodpasture – pathologist and physician
- Caroline Gordon – novelist and wife of Allen Tate
- Mark Green (Tennessee politician) – U.S. representative, former Tennessee state senator
- Clay Greenfield - NASCAR Xfinity and Truck Series Driver
- William J. Hadden Jr. - (1921–1995) Protestant minister, politician, television presenter
- Ryne Harper – baseball player
- Trenton Hassell – NBA player with Minnesota Timberwolves, Chicago Bulls, Dallas Mavericks, New Jersey Nets
- Whit Haydn – magician, vice-president of Magic Castle
- Roland Hayes – musician
- Tommy Head – member of Tennessee House of Representatives
- Gustavus Adolphus Henry Sr. – "Eagle Orator of Tennessee"
- Percy Howard – wide receiver for Dallas Cowboys
- Douglas S. Jackson – member of Tennessee Senate
- Cave Johnson – Congressman and U.S. Postmaster General under President James K. Polk
- Howard Johnson – football player and U.S. Marine killed in Battle of Iwo Jima
- Micah Johnson – Miami Dolphins linebacker
- Dorothy Jordan – film actress
- Joseph Buckner Killebrew – educator, lawyer, originator of liberal public school law
- Scotty Kilmer - Car Mechanic and YouTube Personality
- Nate Landwehr - UFC Fighter (Featherweight)
- Jalen Reeves-Maybin – NFL linebacker Chicago Bears
- Horace Lisenbee – MLB player, pitcher for Washington Senators
- Ricky Lumpkin - NFL player for the Raiders, Cardinals, and Colts. Graduated from Kenwood High School
- Horace Harmon Lurton – Justice of U.S. Supreme Court
- John Hartwell Marable – member of U.S. House of Representatives
- Shawn Marion – Olympic and professional basketball player
- Isaac Murphy – first Reconstruction-era governor of Arkansas
- Robert Loftin Newman – oil painter
- Mary C. Noble – judge of Kentucky Supreme Court
- Norris W. Overton – U.S. Air Force Brigadier General
- Wayne Pace – CFO of Time Warner
- Asahel Huntington Patch – also known as A. H. Patch, inventor of Blackhawk corn sheller
- Austin Peay – Governor of Tennessee (1922–1927); namesake of Austin Peay State University
- Thomas Minott Peters – lawyer and botanist
- Chonda Pierce – Christian comedian and performer
- Key Pittman – U.S. Senator from Nevada
- Alex Poythress – NBA & former University of Kentucky basketball player
- DJ Pryor – stand-up comedian and actor
- Jeff Purvis – NASCAR driver
- James B. Reynolds – member of U.S. House of Representatives
- Phil Roe – politician
- Mason Rudolph – professional golfer
- Wilma Rudolph – first female athlete to win three gold medals in single Olympic games
- Brenda Vineyard Runyon – founder and director of First Woman's Bank of Tennessee (1919–1926)
- Clarence Saunders – grocer, founder of Piggly Wiggly
- Evelyn Scott – writer, poet, and novelist
- Valentine Sevier – Revolutionary War soldier and brother of John Sevier (first governor of Tennessee)
- George Sherrill – baseball player
- Rachel Smith – Miss Tennessee USA and Miss USA (2007)
- Rick Stansbury – basketball coach
- Travis Stephens – football player with Tampa Bay Buccaneers
- James Storm – professional wrestler
- William "Sammy" Stuard – chairman of Tennessee Bankers Association, CEO of F&M Bank
- Pat Summitt – University of Tennessee at Knoxville women's basketball coach, Hall of Famer
- Frank Sutton – actor, played Sergeant Vince Carter in Gomer Pyle, USMC TV series
- Allen Tate – poet
- Sloan Thomas – wide receiver for Tennessee Titans
- Mageina Tovah – actress
- Jamie Walker – MLB relief pitcher
- Robert Penn Warren – First United States Poet Laureate
- Bubba Wells – APSU alumnus and NBA player
- William Westmoreland – military commander in Vietnam
- Clarence Cameron White – musician
- James "Fly" Williams – player in original American Basketball Association
- Howie Wright – NBA player

== In popular culture ==
- The Monkees 1966 #1 song "Last Train to Clarksville" is sometimes said to reference the city's train depot and a soldier from Fort Campbell during the Vietnam War era, but Clarksville was actually picked just for its euphonious sound.
- The music video for the 1986 song "Twenty Years Ago" by country singer Kenny Rogers was filmed on Franklin Street in Clarksville, Tennessee.

Home of Gary the Guardrail. Gary resides just off of exit 1, on Tylertown Rd, in front of O'Connor's. He has been taken out by many semi trucks over the years and balloons in honor of his demise are usually left on location.

The video for Sheryl Crow's 1994 Grammy winning "All I wanna Do" was filmed in front of the Roxy Theater, on the corner of Franklin Street and North 1st Street.

- The home of Rhonda The Roundabout, the famous traffic circle that is home to the Rhonda 500. A very popular race that tests the endurance of many notable drivers and is soon to be a state sanctioned event.

Nicole Kidman's 2025 thriller, Holland, was partially filmed in downtown Clarksville.

== Nicknames ==
Clarksville's nicknames have included The Queen City, Queen of the Cumberland, and Gateway to the New South. In April 2008, the city adopted "Tennessee's Top Spot!" as its new brand nickname.

== Sister city ==
Gunpo, Gyeonggi, South Korea

== Bibliography ==
- Federal News Service (May 21, 2009), Opinion No. 09-94: Tennessee Attorney General Issues Opinion on Charter of the City of Clarksville, Washington, D.C.
