= Kenwood High School =

Kenwood High School may mean:

- Kenwood Academy, a junior-senior high school opened as Kenwood High School in 1969 in Chicago, Cook County, Illinois
- Kenwood High School (Maryland), established in 1931 in Essex, Baltimore County, Maryland
- Kenwood High School (Tennessee), established in 1997 in Clarksville, Montgomery County, Tennessee

== See also ==
- Kentwood High School (disambiguation)
