= General Overton =

General Overton may refer to:

- Norris W. Overton (1926–2023), U.S. Air Force brigadier general
- Robert Overton (c. 1609–1678), English Civil War major general
- Walter Hampden Overton (1788–1845), Louisiana Militia major general
