= Clarksville station =

Railway station in Tennessee, United States

Coordinates: 36.528500°N 87.345597°W

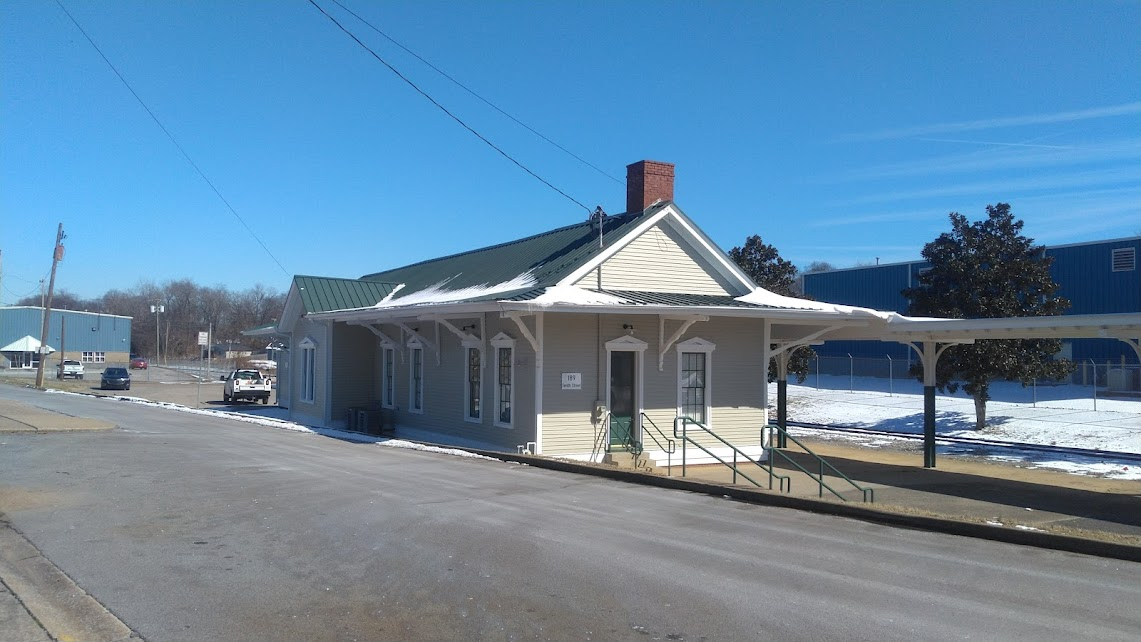
The former depot in Clarksville

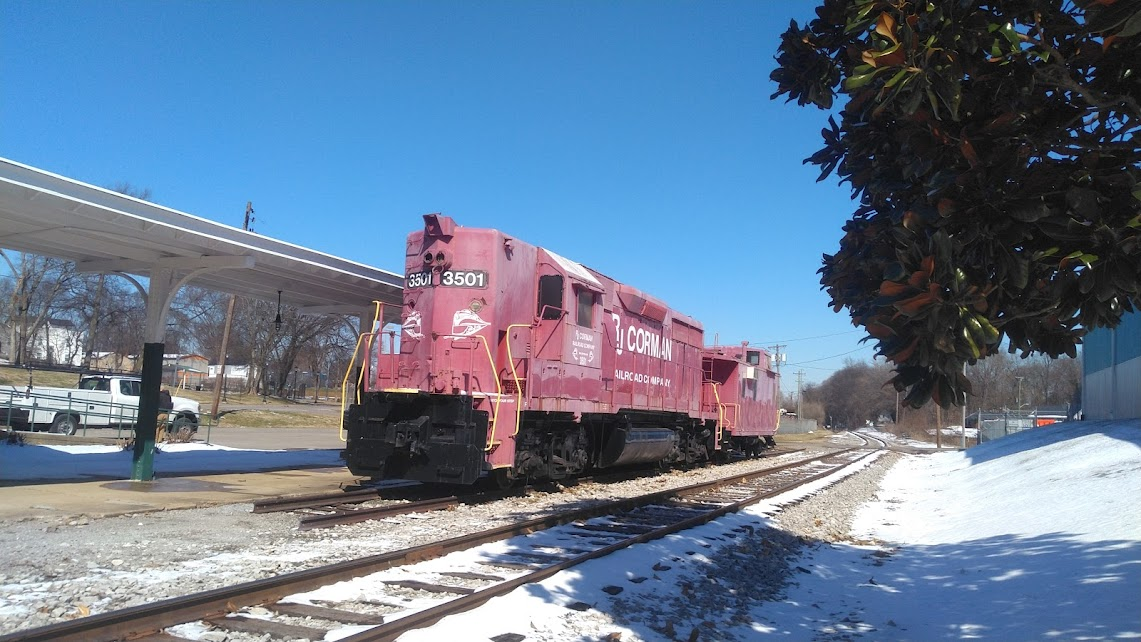
R.J. Corman 3501 (ex-Southern 2641) on display at the depot

The Louisville and Nashville Railroad Train Station is a restored railroad station in Clarksville, Tennessee. It was opened by the Memphis, Clarksville and Louisville Railroad in 1859.

The station area, located at 10th St and Commerce, was restored in 1996 to circa 1901 AD condition and includes a diesel locomotive donated by RJ Corman and a caboose donated by the Pratt Museum at Fort Campbell. It is home to the local farmers market and a local historical society. It can also be rented out for events.

The station was at first widely believed to be the one referenced in The Monkees 1966 song "Last Train to Clarksville", though this turned out to be just a coincidence.

Preceding station	Louisville and Nashville Railroad	Following station
Steeles toward Memphis	Memphis – Bowling Green	Princeton Junction toward Bowling Green
