= Kentwood High School =

Kentwood High School may refer to:

- Kentwood High School (Louisiana), in Kentwood, Louisiana
- Kentwood High School (Washington) in Covington, Washington

== See also ==
- Kenwood High School (disambiguation)
