= Cunningham, Montgomery County, Tennessee =

Cunningham, Tennessee
- Unincorporated community
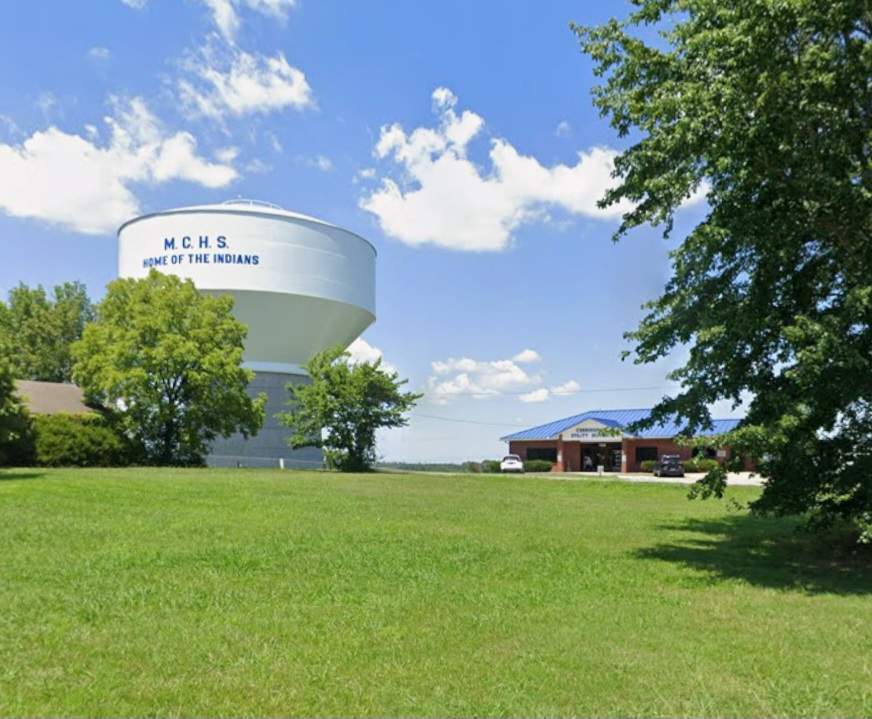
- Cunningham Utility District

- Location within Tennessee Location within the United States
- Coordinates: 36°23′36″N 87°23′14″W
- Country: United States
- State: Tennessee
- County: Montgomery
- Elevation: 659 ft (201 m)
- Time zone: UTC-6 (Central (CST))
  - Summer (DST): UTC-5 (CDT)
- ZIP code: 37052
- Area code: 931
- GNIS feature ID: 1306238

Cunningham is an unincorporated community in Montgomery County, Tennessee, United States. It is located approximately 9.5 miles south of downtown Clarksville, at the intersection of State Route 13 and State Route 48. Cunningham has a post office, with ZIP code 37052.

Cunningham is the location of Montgomery Central High, Middle, and Elementary Schools, as well as a volunteer fire department, several businesses, along with numerous homes and farms.

== History ==
Cunningham was tied to the agricultural development of southern Montgomery County along the State Route 13 corridor. The community shares its name with the locally prominent Cunningham family, which included John Talley Cunningham (1877–1945), a judge and Speaker of the Tennessee House of Representatives who served as the first president of the Eastern Dark-Fired Tobacco Growers Association.

During the American Civil War, the rural districts of southern Montgomery County were affected by the 1862 fall of Fort Donelson and the subsequent Union occupation of nearby Clarksville, leading to frequent activity by scouting parties in the area. In 1940, the Southside High School was merged with Montgomery Central, shifting the educational focus of the area. The current Montgomery Central High School campus, noted for its unique "three dome" mid-century modern architecture, was constructed in 1968 and continues to serve as a central social landmark for the Cunningham community.

Cunningham's post office was established in 1892 and is still currently being used.
