= Clarksville-Montgomery County School System =

School district in Tennessee, United States

Address
- 621 Gracey Avenue Clarksville, Tennessee, 37040; United States
- Coordinates: 36.5211°N 87.3453°W

District information
- Grades: K-12
- Enrollment: 39,938 (as of 2025-26)

Other information
- Website: http://www.cmcss.net

Clarksville-Montgomery County School System (CMCSS) is a system of schools in Montgomery County, Tennessee serving a population of over 166,722 people. It is the seventh largest district in Tennessee and has earned whole district accreditation. CMCSS is also ISO 9001 certified. Jean Luna-Vedder is currently the Director of Schools.

The system serves most of the county. However portions in Fort Campbell are zoned to Department of Defense Education Activity (DoDEA) schools.

The school system has a graduation rate of 94.3% which is higher than the state of Tennessee's 89.6%.

There are 44 schools in the district: one K-5 Magnet School, 24 elementary, 8 middle, 7 high, an Alternative School, one Early Technical College at Tennessee College of Applied Technology, and one Middle College, which is located on the campus of Austin Peay State University, a Spanish Immersion School, an Early Learning School, and a K-12 Virtual School. Students who are enrolled in CMCSS K-12 Virtual are subject to all State of Tennessee and School Board policies governing promotion, retention, and graduation. All students in virtual school receive live instruction. It will be possible that due to the tremendous growth in Clarksville-Montgomery County, that more schools will need to be built in the near future as most schools have a capacity of over 100%.

The school system employs about 2,500+ certified teachers. The School System employs 5,400+ employees total.

== List of schools ==
=== High schools ===
- Clarksville
- Kenwood
- Kirkwood
- Middle College at APSU
- Montgomery Central
- Northeast
- Northwest
- Rossview
- West Creek

=== Middle schools ===
- Greenwood Complex (Alternative School)
- Kenwood
- Kirkwood
- Montgomery Central
- New Providence
- Northeast
- Richview
- Rossview
- West Creek

=== Elementary schools ===
- Barkers Mill
- Barksdale
- Byrns Darden
- Carmel
- Cumberland Heights
- East Montgomery
- Freedom (Opening 2026)
- Glenellen
- Hazelwood
- Kenwood
- Kirkwood
- Liberty
- Minglewood
- Montgomery Central
- Moore Magnet
- Norman Smith
- Northeast
- Oakland
- Pisgah
- Ringgold
- Rossview
- St. Bethlehem Early Learning Center
- Sango
- Spanish Immersion at Barksdale
- West Creek
- Woodlawn

== Notable alumni ==
- Raven Jackson, Kenwood, filmmaker and writer
- Alex Poythress, Northeast, basketball player
- Jalen Reeves-Maybin, Northeast, football player
