= Ogburn Chapel Missionary Baptist Church =

Church in Tennessee, United States

Coordinates: 36.5100°N 87.4632°W

Ogburn Chapel Church is located in 1660 Ogburn Chapel Road, Clarksville, Montgomery County, Tennessee.

== History ==
The church was founded in 1865 by Rev. Fealand Quarles. It was reestablished in 1985 by Rev. Jimmy R. Bosley. It is named after the Ogburn family because they provided money and support to build the church. The current pastor is Rev. Lewis C. Thompson.

There are 134 interments in the cemetery behind the church.

== Former Ministers ==
- Rev George Washington
- Rev Collins
- Rev Chilton
- Rev Jim Merriweather
- Rev Alex Kirks
- Rev Tyler
- Rev Ike Roberts
- Rev Elvan Roberts
- Rev Turner Paris
- Rev Howard Daniel Garrard (1890-1949)
- Rev Wash Grant
- Rev Taylor
- Rev Terry Metcalfe
- Rev E.H. Brown
- Rev George Babbs
- Rev Jimmy Bosley
- Rev John W. Hill-Nicholson
