= A. H. Patch =

American inventor (1825–1909)

Asahel Huntington Patch (November 18, 1825 – January 29, 1909) was an inventor, and manufacturer from Hamilton, Massachusetts.

In 1872, Patch patented his first pole-mounted corn sheller. It was featured in Scientific American magazine in 1872. According to an article in the Clarksville [Leaf Chronicle] dated July 17, 1966, Patch's corn sheller was given the "highest award of the World's Fair" at the 1893 Columbian World's Fair in Chicago, Illinois for ingenuity. One of the major themes of the Chicago World's Fair was that of the value of corn as a crop and as a dietary staple.

Patch moved to Louisville, Kentucky and later to Clarksville, Tennessee where he also invented other box shellers. His most famous sheller was called the "Blackhawk corn sheller."
