= Clarksville City Arboretum =

Arboretum in Clarksville, Tennessee, US

- Interactive map of Clarksville City Arboretum
- Type: Arboretum
- Location: Clarksville, Tennessee
- Coordinates: 36°30′23.4″N 87°22′11.63″W
- Created: 2002

The Clarksville City Arboretum is an arboretum located along the Cumberland River in Fairgrounds Park, Clarksville, Tennessee. It was certified as an arboretum in 2002, and includes over 30 species of trees.

== See also ==
- List of botanical gardens in the United States
