= Brenda Vineyard Runyon =

Brenda Vineyard Runyon (1868–1929), founder and director of the First Woman's Bank of Tennessee in Clarksville, Tennessee in 1919. The bank was the first in the United States to be managed and directed entirely by women. Ms Runyon resigned from her position in 1926 due to failing health and could not secure a successor. The First Trust and Savings Bank of Clarksville absorbed the bank in 1926.

Ms. Runyon was the wife of a Clarksville physician, Dr. Frank Runyon. Both doctor and Ms Runyon were born in Trenton, Todd County, Kentucky. They had two sons, and both pursued professional careers. Ms. Runyon was active in the civic affairs of Clarksville and was director of the Clarksville branch of the American Red Cross during World War I. Following the war, Ms Runyon organized the First Woman's Bank of Tennessee after being challenged to do so by a local business.

A fall in 1926 led to declining health and her resignation as bank director, eventually dying as a result on February 3, 1929.
