= Roxy Theatre (Clarksville, Tennessee) =

Coordinates: 36.52707°N 87.36007°W

Clarksville Roxy Theater

The Roxy Theatre is a theatre located in the historic downtown section of Clarksville, Tennessee in the United States. Standing on a corner of the Public Square it offers live theater shows to the public offering a wide variety of selection in the spirit of literary theater. The Roxy was built in 1947 after the 1913 Lilian Theater burned down in 1945.

The Roxy has been used as a backdrop for numerous photo shoots, films, documentaries, music videos and television commercials; most notably for Sheryl Crow's Grammy-award-winning song All I Wanna Do.

Since the early 20th century, the corner of Franklin and First has been the anchor for Clarksville's entertainment community. The Lillian, built in 1912, was the first theatre on this corner. Following a fire in 1913, the Lillian was rebuilt in 1914 and saw thousands of patrons enjoying first-run movies.

Following a second fire in 1945, and with the advent of Fort Campbell, the Lillian was completely rebuilt and at last became The Roxy. A sleek exterior, featuring a new lighting called neon, beaconed movie-goers from miles around. Opening in 1947, The Roxy entertained Clarksvillians with first-run movies until 1980.

In 1995, a professional company was created in order to supply the great demand for Shakespeare, Greek classics, school curriculum and holiday shows, and to enlarge the Roxy's outreach services to the community. Since its inception, the company has produced over 500 mainstage productions.

The Roxy Regional School of the Arts was also born in 1995, offering teens extensive training in modern theatre as well as being able to work alongside professionals. The summer offers a joint project between the Roxy and the Clarksville-Montgomery County Parks and Recreation Department, offering teens a six-week drama camp for a nominal fee.
