= DJ Pryor =

American stand-up comedian and actor

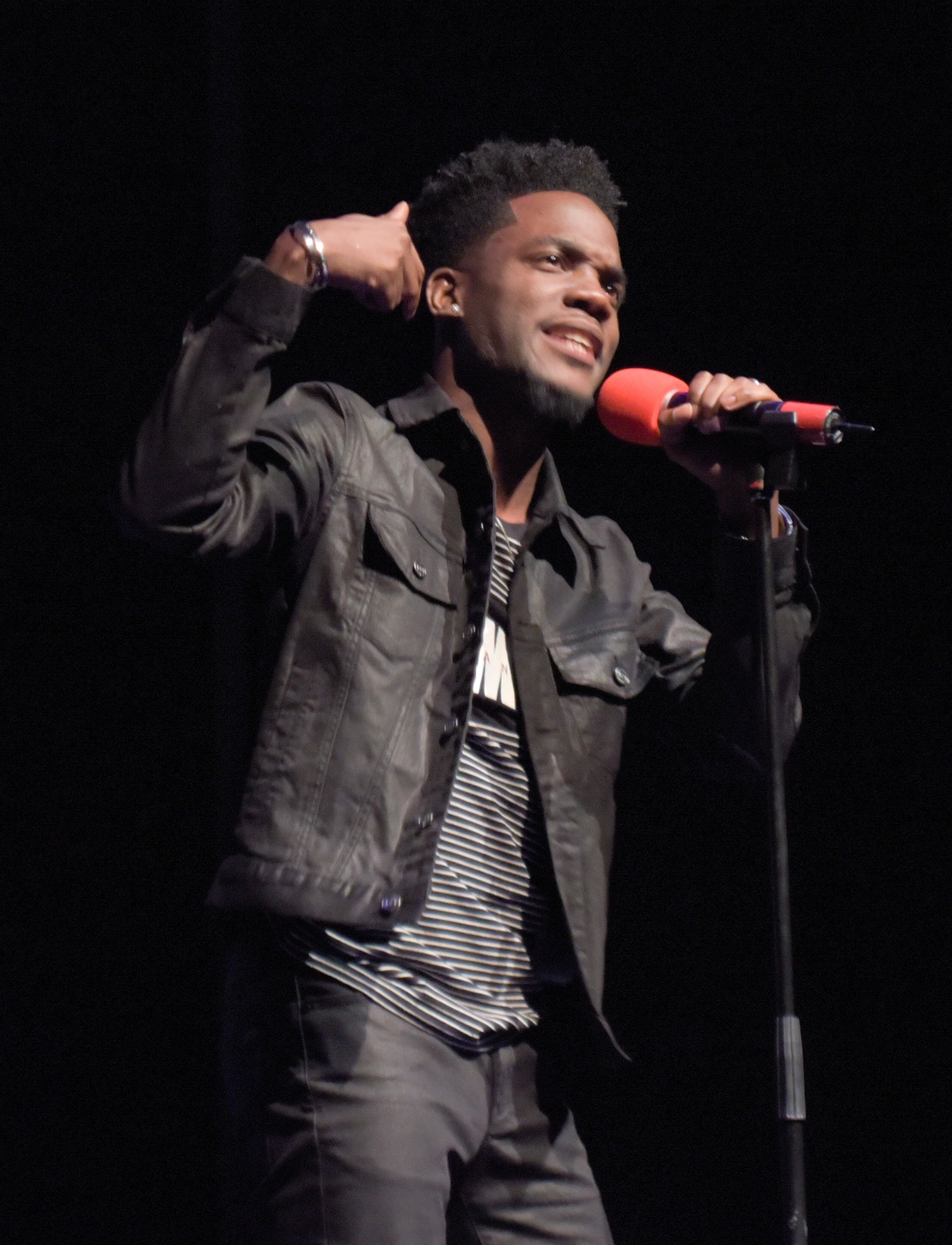
- Born: Deztin J. Pryor; Petersburg, Virginia, U.S.
- Spouse: Shanieke Pryor (m. 2015)
- Children: 3

Comedy career
- Years active: 2012–present
- Medium: Actor/Stand-up comedian

Deztin J. Pryor, known professionally as D.J. Pryor, is an American actor and stand-up comedian. In January 2019, Pryor participated in the CBS Diversity Sketch Comedy Showcase. He has acted in short films.

== Early life ==
Deztin Pryor is originally from Petersburg, Virginia, splitting time in Richmond, before moving to Clarksville, Tennessee due to his father's military service. He is the oldest of 12 children. Pryor was born when his mother was 13 years old. As a child, his grandmother would let him watch Bill Cosby and he would secretly watch Richard Pryor (no relation). He began doing stand-up comedy professionally at the age of 15 years.

== Career ==
Pryor performs in a variety of venues from comedy clubs to churches and colleges. He has performed at the Virginia House of Comedy. Pryor was once the opening act for Corey Clark. In 2012, Pryor's promoter and manager was Kasey Carlton. In 2019, Mechelle Mason took over as Pryor's management team with Javier Salgado.

Pryor has trained under Kim Hardin and participated in improvisation classes with Chris Berube. He has performed in commercials for Allstate and Jack Daniel's. He hosted a radio show, The DJ Pryor Show in early 2014. As of February 2019, he is represented by APA Talent Agency and still based out of Clarksville, TN. In January 2019, Pryor participated in the CBS Diversity Sketch Comedy Showcase. He was one of 21 actors and comedians selected out of over 3,000 auditions. Pryor has acted in several short films.

In June 2019, Pryor and his son, Kingston, were featured in a Denny's commercial for Father's Day. The Wired recognized Pryor as a "dadfluencer."

At the close of 2019, DJ Pryor was a guest on Dateline NBC's: A Toast to 2019! and Dick Clark's New Year's Rockin' Eve 2020 to commemorate the highlights of 2019.

As of September 2021, DJ Pryor performed in commercials for the Tennessee Titans. Pryor has also been featured as a guest on "Titans Blitz" showing Wednesdays on Nashville's MyTV 30 and Nashville's Fox 17. Pryor's segment "All Titan'd Up" on "Titans Blitz" will be featured falling on the week of Titans' home games.

=== Artistry ===
Pryor cites Eddie Murphy, Martin Lawrence, Chris Tucker and Flip Wilson as early influences on his style. Pryor's stand-up routines are based on his real life.

== Personal life ==
Pryor resides in Clarksville, Tennessee with his family. He has been married to Shanieke Pryor since 2015. Pryor has two sons, Jabari and Kingston, and a daughter, Zaria. Older son, Jabari was born in 2011 from a previous relationship. Kingston (born 2017) and Zaria (born 2020) with his wife, Shanieke. Pryor is Christian.

In 2019, a home video of him "conversing" with then 19-month old Kingston went viral. Author Jenny Anderson and Al Race of the Center on the Developing Child at Harvard University remark that Pryor's interaction with his son demonstrates a social-feedback loop called serve-and-return which contributes to child development.

== Television ==
=== Television ===
- Dick Clark's New Year's Rockin Eve With Ryan Seacrest 2020
- A Toast to 2019!

== Filmography ==
=== Film ===
- Country Strong
- The Konichiwa Kid
- Message Read
