= Donnie Dewees =

American baseball player (born (1993)

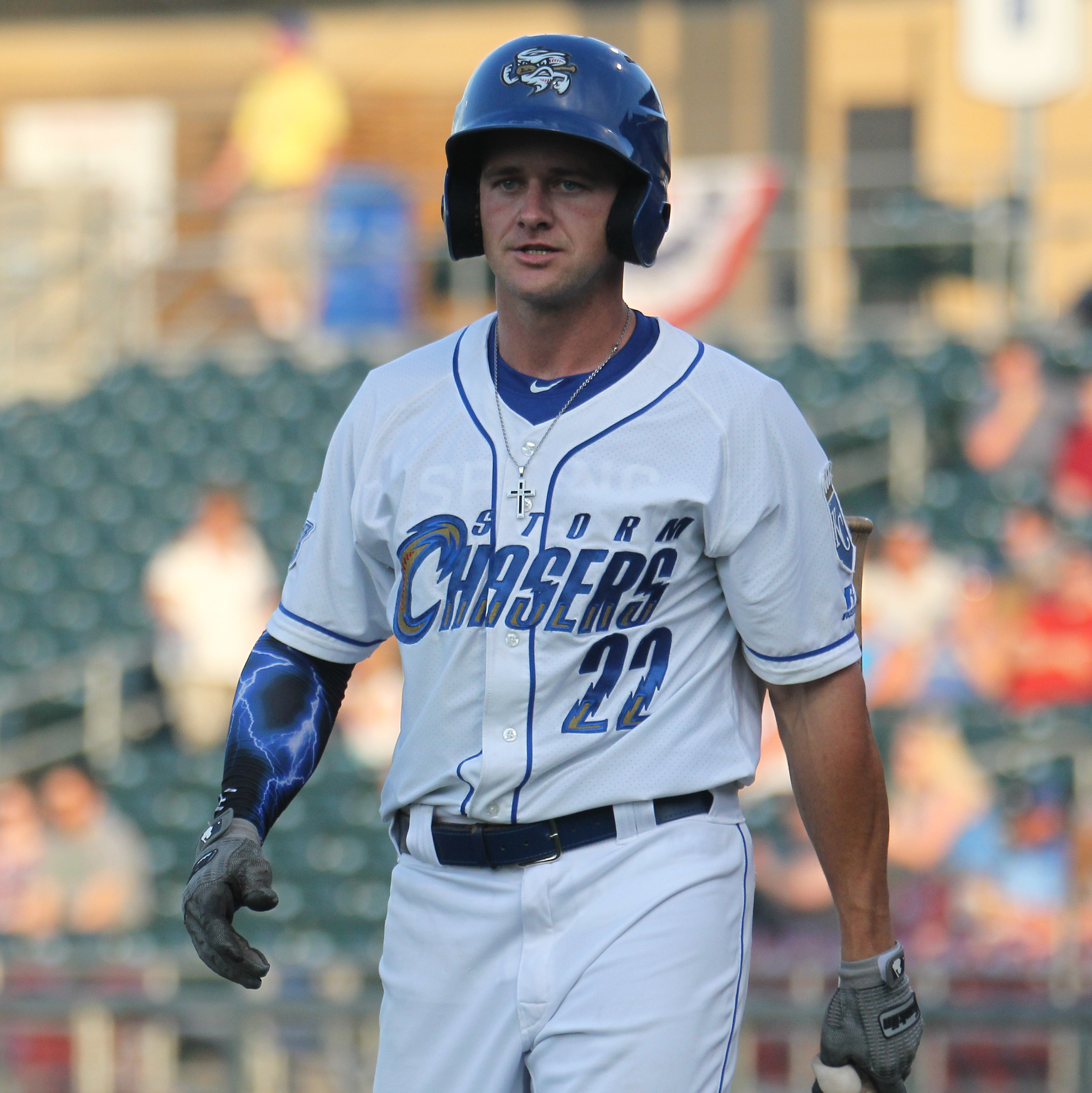
- Dewees with the Omaha Storm Chasers in 2018
- Outfielder
- Born: September 29, 1993 (age 31); Inverness, Florida, U.S.
- Bats: Left Throws: Left

Donald William Dewees Jr. (born September 29, 1993) is an American former professional baseball outfielder. He played college baseball for the North Florida Ospreys of the University of North Florida.

== Amateur career ==
Dewees attended Crystal River High School in Crystal River, Florida, and enrolled at the University of North Florida to play college baseball for the North Florida Ospreys. He had a .347 batting average as a freshman, and was named a Freshman All-American. He batted .319 as a sophomore. He played collegiate summer baseball in the Northwoods League after his freshman year. In the summer after his 2014 sophomore year, he played for the Hyannis Harbor Hawks of the Cape Cod Baseball League, and was named a league all-star. In 2015, Dewees was named ASUN Conference Player of the Year.

== Professional career ==
=== Chicago Cubs ===
Expected to be an early selection in the 2015 Major League Baseball draft, the Chicago Cubs selected Dewees in the second round, with the 47th overall selection, of the draft. He signed with the Cubs, receiving a $1.7 million signing bonus, and made his professional debut for the Eugene Emeralds of the Low-A Northwest League. He spent all of 2015 with Eugene, batting .266 with five home runs and 30 RBIs in 66 games. Dewees opened the 2016 season with the South Bend Cubs of the Single-A Midwest League, and was later promoted to the Myrtle Beach Pelicans of the High-A Carolina League. In 129 games between both teams he compiled a .284 batting average, five home runs and 73 RBIs, along with 31 stolen bases.

=== Kansas City Royals ===
On February 8, 2017, the Cubs traded Dewees to the Kansas City Royals for pitcher Alec Mills. Dewees spent the 2017 season with the Northwest Arkansas Naturals of the Double-A Texas League where he posted a .272 batting average with nine home runs, 52 RBIs, and 20 stolen bases in 126 games. In 2018, Dewees played for the Omaha Storm Chasers of the Triple-A Pacific Coast League (PCL).

=== Chicago Cubs (second stint) ===
On March 8, 2019, the Royals traded Dewees back to the Cubs for Stephen Ridings. The Cubs assigned Dewees to the Triple-A Iowa Cubs of the PCL. On July 24, 2019, he recorded a save against the San Antonio Missions in his first pitching appearance. He finished the year playing in 111 games, slashing .253/.334/.459 with 16 home runs, 52 RBI, and 6 stolen bases. Dewees did not play in a game in 2020 due to the cancellation of the minor league season because of the COVID-19 pandemic.

In November 2020, Dewees suffered a knee injury that resulted in him missing the entire 2021 season. He began the 2022 season with Triple-A Iowa, playing in 13 games and hitting .286/.333/.429 with one home run, 6 RBI, and 4 stolen bases. He was later shut down and underwent surgery on the same knee to repair a cartilage issue, causing his to miss the remainder of the year. He elected free agency following the season on November 10, 2022.
