= First Woman's Bank of Tennessee =

First Woman's Bank of Tennessee was founded by Brenda Vineyard Runyon in Clarksville, Tennessee, in 1919. The ongoing women's suffrage movement reflected many women's desire to hold accounts independently of male relatives. The bank was the first in the United States to be managed and directed entirely by women. The novel concept resulted in a total of $20,000 in deposits on its first day of business, October 6, 1919.

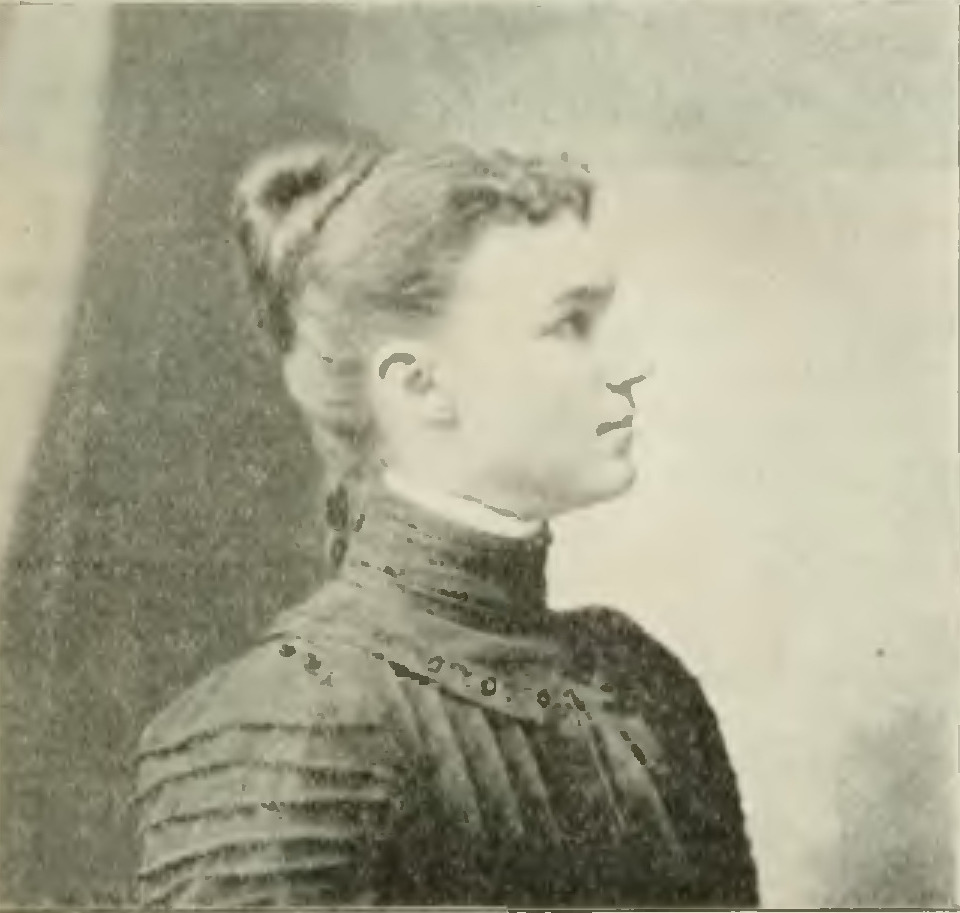
Lulu Bringhurst Epperson

It was located within the Hotel Arlington (now Hotel Montgomery) and is now sited by an Arlington historic marker. Lulu Bringhurst Epperson owned the hotel at the time and was the first to make a deposit. Men and women were permitted to maintain savings and investment accounts.

Runyon resigned her position in 1926 due to failing health and was unable to secure a successor. The First Trust and Savings Bank of Clarksville absorbed the bank in 1926.

== Bibliography ==
- First Woman's Bank in Tennessee: 1919-1926. H. Bruce Throckmorton and H. Bruce Throckman. Tennessee Historical Quarterly, Vol. 35, No. 4 (Winter 1976), pp. 389–392
