= West Creek High School =

Location
- 1210 West Creek Coyote Trail; Clarksville, Montgomery, Tennessee 37042; United States; 36.6116°N 87.3906°W

Information
- School type: Public secondary
- Motto: We Are West Creek
- Established: Fall 2009
- School district: Clarksville-Montgomery County School System.
- Principal: Will Ferrell
- Teaching staff: 85.38 (FTE)
- Grades: 9-12
- Enrollment: 1,654 (2023–2024)
- Student to teacher ratio: 19.37
- Colors: Maroon and silver
- Slogan: We are West Creek
- Mascot: Coyote
- Nickname: Coyotes
- Graduates (2010): 149
- Affiliations: Tennessee Secondary School Athletic Association
- Website: https://westcreekhigh.cmcss.net/

West Creek High School is a public high school located in Clarksville, Tennessee. It is part of the Clarksville-Montgomery County School System.

West Creek High School was established in the Fall of 2009. It was built to provide another school for the overpopulated Northeast High School. For the opening of its first year, it was led under the leadership of principal Dr. Clara Patterson. The first graduating class held 149 seniors. The most recent graduating class, Class of 2024, had 2 salutatorians.

West Creek High School's Junior Classical League chapter has earned numerous awards at regional, mid-state, state, and national levels. The JROTC drill team is nationally ranked, taking first place overall at the National High School Drill Team Championship, hosted by Sports Network International in Daytona Beach, FL. The raider team is nationally ranked. West Creek High School is also known for having the first radio broadcasting class for students of Montgomery County. The mascot is a coyote and the school motto is We Are West Creek.
