= Moses Renfroe =

American settler

Moses Renfroe was one of a group of settlers who arrived in middle Tennessee in 1780 along with James Robertson, the founder of Nashville, with the goal of starting a settlement. They departed from Robertson’s main group on the Cumberland River, moving up the Red River towards Robertson County, Tennessee, in the area of Port Royal State Park.

The party consisted of Moses, Isaac, Joseph and James Renfroe; Nathan and Solomon Turpin; Isaac Mayfield; James Hollis; James Johns; and a widow named Jones, with their respective families.

Renfroe and his party were the first known European settlers to form a permanent homestead in Montgomery County, Tennessee. During the summer of 1780, the party were massacred by Indians, thus ending the settlement temporarily. However, in 1782 the Legislature of North Carolina authorized rights of pre-emption upon settlers on the Cumberland. This action meant that settlers were authorized to take actions to defend themselves more aggressively, and resulted in a significant increase of immigration into the area.

== Sources ==
- http://www.tngenweb.org/montgomery/earlysettlers.html
