= Montgomery Central High School =

Location
- 3955 Highway 48; Cunningham, TN, 37052; USA
- 36.3999°N 87.3833°W

Information
- Type: Public
- Principal: Christy Houston
- Faculty: 56.50
- Grades: 9-12
- Enrollment: 1, 003 (2025-26)
- Student to teacher ratio: 17.66
- Colors: Red and White
- Team name: Indian
- Website: MCHS

Montgomery Central High School is a high school located in Cunningham, Tennessee, an unincorporated suburban community outside Clarksville. It is part of the Clarksville-Montgomery County School System. It has a GreatSchools rating of 6 out of 10. The Montgomery Central Middle School is situated on an adjacent site.

== History ==
The school building was completed around 1970. It is an unusual structure situated on a man-made lake and featuring concrete shell construction. Major renovations and an expansion were begun in 2010 to maintain and enhance the forty-year-old pod structures. The project is funded with an interest free bond administered under the American Recovery and Reinvestment Act of 2009.
