= Suard =

Suard is a French surname. Notable people with it include:

- Amélie Suard (1743–1830), writer and salonnière
- Jean-Baptiste-Antoine Suard (1732–1817), journalist, translator and writer
- Pierre Suard (1934–2025), electrical engineer
