= Ringgold Mill =

Coordinates: 36.599722°N 87.420278°W

One of the earliest commercial developments in the Clarksville, Tennessee communities is the Ringgold Mill located in what is now north Clarksville. It was a grist mill that was originally built in 1810, by Thomas Rivers. The mill was situated along the banks of the Little West Fork Creek in the Ringgold Community.

In 1853, the new owner of the property, Mr. M. D. Davie, had a stone dam built to improve the efficiency of the mill at a cost of about $10,000. He also added a house to the property in 1857. Union troops partially destroyed the mill in 1863, in an attempt to disrupt Confederate Army supplies, and in retaliation to the loyalties of the mill owner.

Following the war, the mill was rebuilt and operated until 1885, when the mill was once again destroyed by fire as a result of lightning strike. The mill was rebuilt the same year, and improved upon by the addition of a small turbine which replaced the water wheel.

The mill received its current name in 1907, and was used until 1974. During this time it was owned by members of the Durrett family of Clarksville. It is still a beautiful point of interest in the county, but it is located on private property. The mill has also been used as a post office, library, and voter precinct location over the years.

The Mill no longer exists.
