= Wayne Pace =

American businessman

Wayne H. Pace (born 1946 or 1947) is an American former chief financial officer (CFO) and executive vice president of Time Warner. He served as CFO from 2001 until 2007.

He attended Austin Peay State University where he graduated with a bachelor's degree in accounting and economics and he received a Master of Business Administration from the University of Georgia.

In 2006, Pace was involved in a prostitute scandal in New York City.
