= William "Sammy" Stuard =

Sammy Stuard
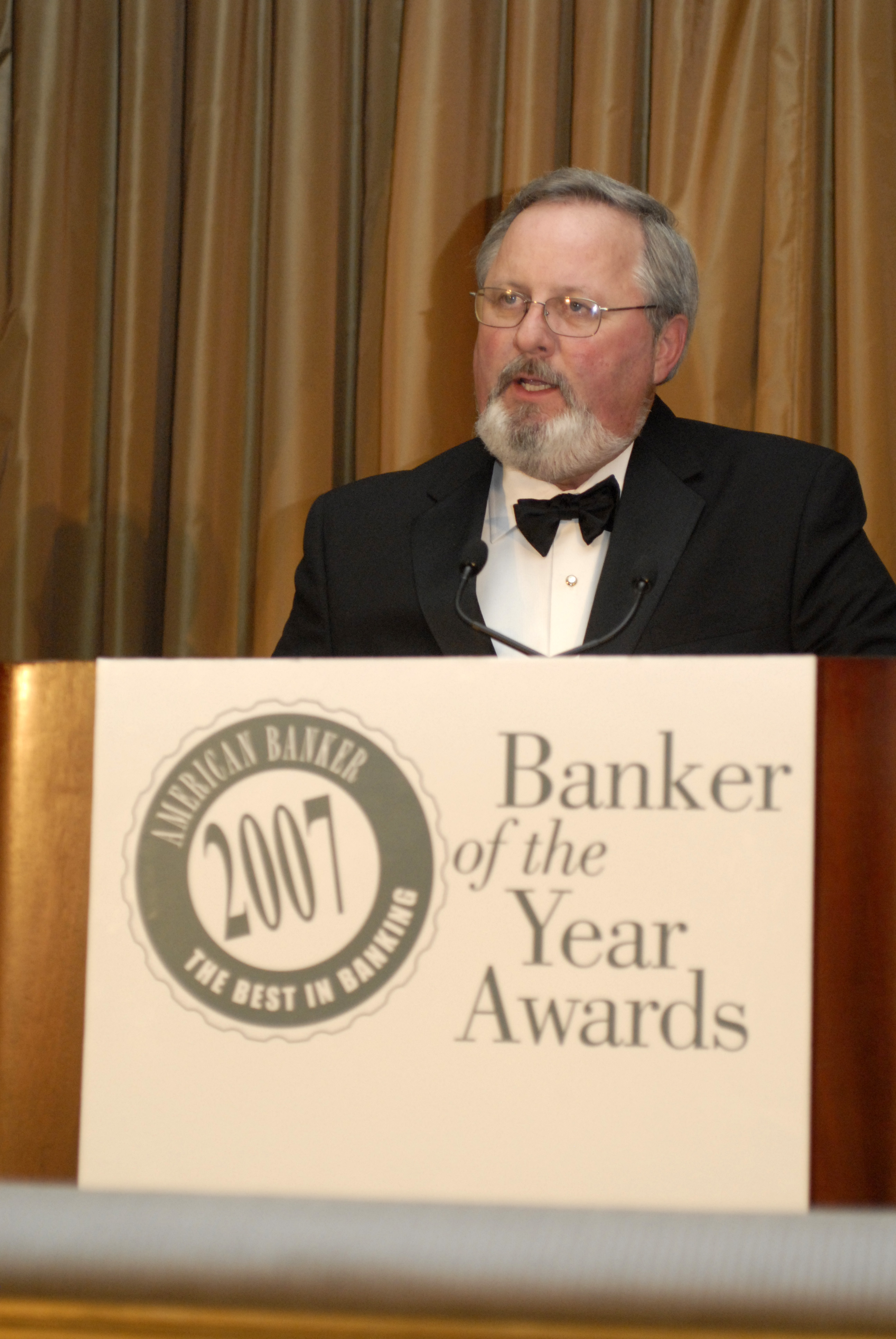
- Sammy Stuard
- Born: November 22, 1954 (age 71); Adams, Tennessee
- Occupations: CEO, President, Farmers & Merchants Bank

William "Sammy" Stuard Jr. is the CEO and President of F&M Bank, which has its headquarters in Clarksville, Tennessee, and has current assets of over $1.2 billion. He is also a past Chairman of the Tennessee Bankers Association. Stuard received the 2020 Wendell H Gilbert Award from Austin Peay State University. [In 2007, Stuard was named "Community Banker of the Year" by the American Banker Magazine. He currently serves on the FHLB of Cincinnati, Clarksville Regional Airport Authority Board of Directors and the ASPIRE Foundation. Stuard has also held a number of government and civic positions, which include serving as a past Montgomery County, TN Commissioner, past chairman of the Clarksville Chamber of Commerce, and the Clarksville Economic Development Council.

== Early life and family ==
Stuard was born on November 22, 1954, in Adams, Tennessee. He was raised both in Florida and Guthrie, Kentucky, by his father William Stuard Sr. and his mother Mattie Belle Stuard. He worked as a butcher and then in real estate before entering the banking sector at Northern Bank in Clarksville. Stuard attended Austin Peay State University, Vanderbilt University, and the Louisiana State University school of banking.

Stuard lives in Clarksville, Tennessee.

== Banking career ==
Stuard started his banking career at Northern Bank, which, at the time, was the oldest bank in the state of Tennessee. He soon moved to Farmers and Merchants Bank and worked his way up through the ranks to President/CEO. Under his leadership, F&M Bank has expanded many times over, both in assets and geographical reach to much of Middle Tennessee and is beginning to enter the Nashville metropolitan area banking market. The bank was named by TN Biz Magazine as one of Tennessee's 100 hottest companies. Stuard and the Bank's approach to community banking has garnered national attention, especially during the turbulence in the national banking industry in 2007 and 2008.

In 2007, American Banker magazine recognized Stuard with its Banker of the Year award in New York City for Stuard and F&M Bank’s unique approach to customer outreach and public relations. In June 2008, Stuard was named the Chairman of the Tennessee Bankers Association. In 2010, then TN Governor Phil Bredesen appointed Stuard to the Tennessee Student Assistance Corp (TSAC) Board of Directors. Current affiliations include Director (TN) Federal Home Loan Bank of Cincinnati, Chairman of ASPIRE Foundation (an organization of private investors created to promote and market the Clarksville, TN community for industrial recruitment), Director of Two Rivers Company Board of Directors, Chairman of the Clarksville Regional Airport Authority and a member of the Austin Peay State University President's Circle of Advisors.

== Government and community service ==
Stuard has held a number of state and local government service positions. He began his government service as the County Commissioner for District 3 of Montgomery County. He served in that position from 1994 to 2002. Subsequently, Stuard served as President of the Clarksville Chamber of Commerce and was appointed Chairman of the North Tennessee Workforce Board. He was selected as the Chairman of the Clarksville-Montgomery County Industrial Development Board of Directors. Stuard served as director and past chairman of the Downtown District Partnership, and in so doing oversaw much of the renewal of Clarksville's downtown districts, especially in the aftermath of a tornado disaster on the downtown area on January 22, 1999. He currently serves as the head of the Economic Development Council of Clarksville/Montgomery County and has spearheaded a number of large development initiatives for the Clarksville area.
