= Scotty Kilmer =

American mechanic, YouTuber, and television personality (born 1953)

- Born: Scott Michael Kilmer; October 2, 1953 (age 72); Niagara Falls, New York, U.S.
- Education: York University (BA); University of Illinois at Urbana–Champaign (MA)
- Occupations: YouTuber; author; auto mechanic
- Spouse: Leslie Kilmer

YouTube information
- Channel: Scotty Kilmer
- Years active: 2007–present
- Genre: Automotive
- Subscribers: 6.65 million
- Views: 3.11 billion
- Last updated: February 2026
- Website: carkiller.com

Scott Michael Kilmer (born October 2, 1953) is an American YouTuber, author, and auto mechanic.

== Early life ==
Scotty Kilmer was born on October 2, 1953, in Niagara Falls, New York. At age 14, he learned to be a mechanic from his grandfather, Elmer Kilmer, who was the chief mechanic at the Texaco gas station which Scotty's father owned. He studied in Toronto, Ontario at York University and received a BA in anthropology in 1975 and then attended the University of Illinois Urbana–Champaign, receiving a master's degree in anthropology. He was in the process of working towards his Ph.D., but eventually quit due to his dissatisfaction with the university tenure system. Kilmer went on to become a mechanic and moved to Houston, Texas in 1980. On the suggestion of his wife, he wrote a book, Everyone's Guide to Buying a Used Car and Car Maintenance, originally published in 1994. Its release led Kilmer to be on the front page of the Houston Chronicle, which attracted the attention of the local CBS affiliate KHOU.

== Career ==
Before YouTube, Kilmer had a television show on KHOU titled Crank it Up with Scotty. In this series, he showed the audience how to diagnose minor automotive mechanical problems, offered opinions on vehicle engineering, and provided solutions to low-profile problems. In 2004, Crank It Up earned a Regional Emmy Award for "Outstanding Interactivity"; Kilmer subsequently received an Emmy for "Best Interactive Car Talk Host." His YouTube channel is much the same, and he answers questions about car problems and the vehicle industry, and gives advice. Kilmer typically uses his customers' cars in his videos as a point of comparison or other demonstrations with various products he uses as a mechanic. He has garnered controversy over the use of "clickbait" video titles.

== Publications ==
- Kilmer, Scotty (14 November 2017) [1994]. Everyone's Guide to Buying a Used Car and Car Maintenance. Independently published. ISBN 978-1973292661. OCLC 1079423286. OL 32476920M.
