= Norris W. Overton =

United States Air Force general (1926–2023)

- Born: January 6, 1926; Clarksville, Tennessee, U.S.
- Died: March 28, 2023 (aged 97) U.S.
- Allegiance: United States
- Branch: United States Air Force
- Service years: 1951–1981
- Rank: Brigadier general
- Commands: Vice Commander
- Conflicts: Vietnam War
- Awards: Legion of Merit; Bronze Star Medal; Air Force Commendation Medal; Outstanding Unit Award; Republic of Korea Presidential Unit Citation; Vietnam Gallantry Cross
- Alma mater: Indiana University Bloomington; Harvard Business School; Air Force Institute of Technology; Industrial College of the Armed Forces; Air War College
- Other work: Amtrak

Norris W. Overton (January 6, 1926 – March 28, 2023) was a brigadier general in the United States Air Force.

== Biography ==
Overton was born on January 6, 1926, in Clarksville, Tennessee. He graduated from Crispus Attucks High School in Indianapolis, Indiana before attending Indiana University Bloomington and Harvard Business School, graduating with a degree in 1972.

== Career ==
Overton was commissioned an officer in the Air Force in 1951. The following year, he was assigned to the 18th Fighter-Bomber Wing in Chinhai, China. Later assignments include being stationed at Bordeaux-Mérignac Air Base in France and Lindsey Air Station in West Germany. He also graduated from the Air Force Institute of Technology, the Industrial College of the Armed Forces and the Air War College.

In 1959, Overton was stationed in Wood-Ridge, New Jersey. The following year, he was stationed in Milwaukee, Wisconsin. In 1963, he was assigned to Karamürsel, Turkey.

From 1964 to 1968, Overton was Associate Professor of Aerospace Studies at the University of Iowa. He was then deployed to serve in the Vietnam War and stationed at Tan Son Nhut Air Base.

After returning to the United States, he was assigned to The Pentagon, the United States Air Force Academy and Pacific Air Forces. In 1979, Overton was named Vice Commander of the Army and Air Force Exchange Service. He retired in 1981.

Awards he received during his career include the Legion of Merit with oak leaf cluster, the Bronze Star Medal with oak leaf cluster, the Air Force Commendation Medal, the Outstanding Unit Award, the Republic of Korea Presidential Unit Citation and the Vietnam Gallantry Cross with palm.

== Later life and death ==
After retiring from the Air Force, he worked for a time with Amtrak.

Overton died on March 28, 2023, at the age of 97.
