= Kenwood High School (Tennessee) =

Location
- 251 East Pine Mountain Road; Clarksville, Montgomery, Tennessee 37042; United States; 36.5816°N 87.3796°W

Information
- School type: Public
- Motto: Unapologetic Greatness
- Established: 1997
- School district: Clarksville-Montgomery County School System
- Principal: Nigel Anderson
- Grades: 9-12
- Enrollment: 1,264 (2025–26)
- Language: English
- Colors: Black and Gold
- Athletics: TSSAA Class 5A Football, Class AAA other sports.
- Mascot: Knight
- Newspaper: The Knight Life
- Yearbook: Chevalier
- Feeder schools: Kenwood Middle School
- Website: Kenwood High School

Kenwood High School is a high school located in Clarksville, Tennessee. It is part of the Clarksville-Montgomery County School System. It is home to the city's largest sports park, and the stadium is the largest high school/middle school stadium. Within this park are 7 soccer fields. These fields are used by many of the high and middle schools in the county for practice and elementary school games.

== Extracurricular activities ==
Kenwood High School has many extracurricular activities, including:

=== Athletics ===
- Baseball
- Basketball
- Bowling
- Cheerleading
- Cross Country
- Football
- Golf
- Marching Band
- Soccer
- Softball
- Tennis
- Track & Field
- Volleyball
- Wrestling
