= National Register of Historic Places listings in Montgomery County, Tennessee =

Location of Montgomery County in Tennessee

This is a list of the National Register of Historic Places listings in Montgomery County, Tennessee.

This is intended to be a complete list of the properties and districts on the National Register of Historic Places in Montgomery County, Tennessee, United States. Latitude and longitude coordinates are provided for many National Register properties and districts; these locations may be seen together in a map.

There are 54 properties and districts listed on the National Register in the county. Another 4 properties were once listed but have been removed.

Contents: Counties in Tennessee
Anderson – Bedford – Benton – Bledsoe – Blount – Bradley – Campbell – Cannon – Carroll – Carter – Cheatham – Chester – Claiborne – Clay – Cocke – Coffee – Crockett – Cumberland – Davidson – Decatur – DeKalb – Dickson – Dyer – Fayette – Fentress – Franklin – Gibson – Giles – Grainger – Greene – Grundy – Hamblen – Hamilton – Hancock – Hardeman – Hardin – Hawkins – Haywood – Henderson – Henry – Hickman – Houston – Humphreys – Jackson – Jefferson – Johnson – Knox – Lake – Lauderdale – Lawrence – Lewis – Lincoln – Loudon – Macon – Madison – Marion – Marshall – Maury – McMinn – McNairy – Meigs – Monroe – Montgomery – Moore – Morgan – Obion – Overton – Perry – Pickett – Polk – Putnam – Rhea – Roane – Robertson – Rutherford – Scott – Sequatchie – Sevier – Shelby – Smith – Stewart – Sullivan – Sumner – Tipton – Trousdale – Unicoi – Union – Van Buren – Warren – Washington – Wayne – Weakley – White – Williamson – Wilson

This National Park Service list is complete through NPS recent listings posted June 26, 2026.

== Current listings ==
| | Name on the Register | Image | Date listed | Location | City or town | Description |
|---|---|---|---|---|---|---|
| 1 | Allen House | | October 3, 1978 (#78002619) | North of Clarksville on Allen-Griffey Rd.; also 2401 and 2409 Allen Griffey Rd. 36°36′12″N 87°22′16″W | Clarksville | Second set of addresses represents a boundary increase of March 27, 2013 |
| 2 | Bethlehem Methodist Church and Cemetery | Bethlehem Methodist Church and Cemetery | June 10, 1994 (#94000576) | Western side of Gholson Rd. about 0.5 miles (0.80 km) south of its junction with Grafton Rd. 36°27′52″N 87°16′33″W | Clarksville | |
| 3 | Catholic Church and Rectory | Catholic Church and Rectory | August 2, 1982 (#82004032) | 716 Franklin St. 36°31′44″N 87°21′03″W | Clarksville | |
| 4 | Clarksville Architectural District | Clarksville Architectural District | May 13, 1976 (#76001791) | Public Sq., Legion, 3rd, Franklin, and Commerce Sts. 36°31′38″N 87°21′36″W | Clarksville | |
| 5 | Clarksville Federal Building | Clarksville Federal Building | June 13, 1972 (#72001246) | 200 S. 2nd St. 36°31′34″N 87°21′30″W | Clarksville | Now used as the Customs House Museum & Cultural Center |
| 6 | Clarksville Foundry and Machine Works Office | Clarksville Foundry and Machine Works Office | November 25, 1987 (#87002007) | 96 Commerce St. 36°31′32″N 87°21′40″W | Clarksville | |
| 7 | Clarksville High School | Clarksville High School | December 8, 1983 (#83004281) | Greenwood Ave. 36°31′31″N 87°20′56″W | Clarksville | |
| 8 | Clarksville Industrial District | Clarksville Industrial District | April 30, 1976 (#76002295) | Bounded by Washington St., Crossland Ave., the Illinois Central railroad line, and the Cumberland River; 36°31′24″N 87°21′44″W | Clarksville | |
| 9 | Clarksville Methodist Church | Clarksville Methodist Church | April 6, 1982 (#82004033) | 334 Main St. 36°31′46″N 87°21′24″W | Clarksville | |
| 10 | Cloverlands | Cloverlands | January 8, 1979 (#79002451) | North of St. Bethlehem on Clarksville-Trenton Rd. 36°38′20″N 87°19′35″W | Clarksville | |
| 11 | Country Woman's Club | Country Woman's Club | July 5, 2006 (#06000549) | 2216 Old Russellville Pike; 36°34′00″N 87°18′07″W | Clarksville | |
| 12 | Dog Hill Architectural District | Dog Hill Architectural District | May 9, 1980 (#80003849) | Munford Ave., 1st, Union, Madison, and 2nd Sts. 36°31′26″N 87°21′34″W | Clarksville | |
| 13 | Dunlop House | Dunlop House | December 18, 2025 (#100012390) | 517 Madison St. 36°31′35″N 87°21′12″W | Clarksville | |
| 14 | Dunlop Milling Company | Dunlop Milling Company | February 12, 1999 (#99000213) | 1138 Franklin St. 36°31′54″N 87°20′31″W | Clarksville | |
| 15 | Emerald Hill | Emerald Hill | July 14, 1971 (#71000826) | N. 2nd St. 36°32′22″N 87°21′41″W | Clarksville | |
| 16 | First Presbyterian Church | First Presbyterian Church | April 30, 1976 (#76001793) | 213 Main St. 36°31′45″N 87°21′31″W | Clarksville | |
| 17 | First Presbyterian Church Manse | First Presbyterian Church Manse | August 31, 2001 (#01000929) | 305 Main St. 36°31′45″N 87°21′28″W | Clarksville | |
| 18 | Forbes-Mabry House | Forbes-Mabry House | January 12, 1995 (#94001544) | 607 N. 2nd St. 36°32′07″N 87°21′38″W | Clarksville | |
| 19 | Fort Defiance CSA/Fort Bruce USA | Fort Defiance CSA/Fort Bruce USA | February 4, 1982 (#82004036) | 120 Duncan St. 36°32′28″N 87°22′25″W | New Providence | |
| 20 | Glenwood Historic District | Glenwood Historic District | November 29, 1996 (#96001405) | 101-109 Glenwood Dr., 110-182 E. Glenwood Dr., and 111-179 W. Glenwood Dr. 36°31′33″N 87°20′21″W | Clarksville | |
| 21 | Golden Hill Cemetery | Golden Hill Cemetery | November 21, 2001 (#01001261) | Seven Mile Ferry Rd. 36°30′11″N 87°20′30″W | Clarksville | |
| 22 | Gracey-Woodward Furnace (40MT378) | | November 25, 1987 (#87002003) | Address Restricted | Clarksville | |
| 23 | Guildfield Missionary Baptist Church | Guildfield Missionary Baptist Church | March 24, 2003 (#03000151) | Guildfield Church Rd. 36°38′25″N 87°10′19″W | South Guthrie | |
| 24 | Johnson-Hach House | Johnson-Hach House | December 10, 1998 (#98001507) | 403 Greenwood Ave. 36°31′28″N 87°20′49″W | Clarksville | |
| 25 | Lafayette Furnace (40MT372) | | November 25, 1987 (#87002000) | Address Restricted | Southside | |
| 26 | Louisa Furnace (40MT379) | | January 12, 1988 (#87002004) | Address Restricted | Slayden | |
| 27 | Madison Street Historic District | Madison Street Historic District | November 22, 1999 (#99001393) | Along Madison St. between S 10th St. and Pageant Ln. 36°31′29″N 87°20′32″W | Clarksville | |
| 28 | Madison Street Methodist Church | Madison Street Methodist Church | May 13, 1976 (#76001794) | 319 Madison St. 36°31′33″N 87°21′22″W | Clarksville | |
| 29 | McCauley Hill Farm | McCauley Hill Farm | March 30, 1995 (#95000268) | 1535 Harville Rd. 36°27′21″N 87°16′29″W | Clarksville | |
| 30 | Mt. Olive Cemetery | Mt. Olive Cemetery | November 16, 2020 (#100005789) | 951 Cumberland Dr. 36°30′39″N 87°21′18″W | Clarksville | |
| 31 | Northington-Beach House | Northington-Beach House | July 19, 2001 (#01000758) | 512 Madison St. 36°31′33″N 87°21′13″W | Clarksville | |
| 32 | Oak Top | Oak Top | July 8, 1980 (#80003850) | 107 Madison Terrace; 36°31′21″N 87°20′15″W | Clarksville | |
| 33 | Old Post House | Old Post House | March 8, 1978 (#78002621) | On U.S. Route 41A; 36°38′06″N 87°26′09″W | Clarksville | |
| 34 | Poplar Spring Furnace (40MT376) | | January 12, 1988 (#87002002) | Address Restricted | Needmore | |
| 35 | Port Royal Road | Port Royal Road | December 12, 2006 (#06001131) | North of the Red River junction west of State Route 238, adjacent to the modern Port Royal Rd. 36°33′25″N 87°08′33″W | Port Royal | |
| 36 | Poston Block | Poston Block | June 13, 1972 (#72001247) | Main St. and Public Square; 36°31′41″N 87°21′43″W | Clarksville | |
| 37 | Samuel Rexinger House | Samuel Rexinger House | April 13, 1977 (#77001284) | 703 E. College St. 36°31′57″N 87°21′06″W | Clarksville | |
| 38 | Riverview | | March 26, 1979 (#79002450) | West of Clarksville on Cumberland Heights Rd. 36°30′13″N 87°22′51″W | Clarksville vicinity | |
| 39 | RiverView Mounds Archeological Site | | March 4, 2009 (#09000116) | 1715 Boyd Rinehart Rd. 36°27′11″N 87°17′50″W | Clarksville vicinity | The site is a multi-mound complex with two platform mounds and associated cemetery and village areas. Although not a large site, it is important for its informational value because of its preservation. The site is currently part of the "RiverView Mounds Family Fun Farm" and is available for public viewing and tours. |
| 40 | Alfred A. Robb House | Alfred A. Robb House | September 22, 2000 (#00001162) | 529 York St. 36°32′10″N 87°21′35″W | Clarksville | |
| 41 | Sailor's Rest Furnace (40MT375) | | November 25, 1987 (#87002001) | Address Restricted | Shiloh | |
| 42 | St. Peter African Methodist Church | St. Peter African Methodist Church | April 6, 1982 (#82004034) | 518 Franklin St. 36°31′42″N 87°21′14″W | Clarksville | |
| 43 | Sevier Station | Sevier Station | May 6, 1971 (#71000827) | Walker St., south of B St. 36°32′38″N 87°22′29″W | Clarksville | |
| 44 | Christopher H. Smith House | Christopher H. Smith House | March 8, 1988 (#88000173) | Spring and McClure Sts. 36°32′04″N 87°21′50″W | Clarksville | |
| 45 | Smith-Hoffman House | Smith-Hoffman House | August 22, 1977 (#77001285) | Beech and A Sts. 36°32′33″N 87°22′42″W | Clarksville | |
| 46 | Sulphur Fork Bridge | Sulphur Fork Bridge | July 20, 2020 (#100005366) | 3300 Old Clarksville Hwy. over the Sulphur Fork of the Red River (Port Royal State Park); 36°33′15″N 87°08′25″W | Adams vicinity | Extends into Robertson County |
| 47 | Tennessee Furnace (40MT383) | | November 25, 1987 (#87002006) | Address Restricted; 36°20′35″N 87°18′34″W | McAllisters Crossroad | |
| 48 | Tip Top | Tip Top | July 15, 1998 (#97001566) | 15 Trahern Terrace; 36°31′29″N 87°20′13″W | Clarksville | |
| 49 | Trinity Church and Rectory | Trinity Church and Rectory | April 6, 1982 (#82004035) | 317 Franklin St. 36°31′41″N 87°21′26″W | Clarksville | |
| 50 | Washington Furnace and Forge (40MT382) | | January 12, 1988 (#87002005) | Address Restricted | Excell | |
| 51 | White Chapel | White Chapel | June 26, 1986 (#86001395) | Rossview Rd. 36°33′43″N 87°13′40″W | Rossview | |
| 52 | Whitehall | Whitehall | January 31, 1978 (#78002622) | Off State Route 12 on Mill Rd. 36°35′49″N 87°24′58″W | Clarksville | |
| 53 | Sanford Wilson House | Sanford Wilson House | September 13, 1978 (#78002623) | Old Ashland City Highway; 36°26′22″N 87°13′08″W | Fredonia | |
| 54 | Yellow Creek Furnace and Forge (40MT371) | | January 12, 1988 (#87001999) | Address Restricted | Needmore | |

== Former listings ==
| | Name on the Register | Image | Date listed | Date removed | Location | City or town | Description |
|---|---|---|---|---|---|---|---|
| 1 | Drane-Foust House | | July 7, 1988 (#88001023) | January 29, 2013 | 319 Home Ave. 36°31′54″N 87°21′24″W | Clarksville | |
| 2 | Home Infirmary | Home Infirmary | August 24, 1978 (#78002620) | July 24, 2008 | Riverside Dr. and Current St. 36°31′00″N 87°21′50″W | Clarksville | Destroyed by arsonist on January 13, 1992. |
| 3 | Minglewood Farm | | October 15, 1987 (#87001856) | March 10, 2009 | 1650 Hopkinsville Highway; 36°34′41″N 87°24′43″W | Clarksville | |
| 4 | Ringgold Mill Complex | | July 8, 1980 (#80003851) | December 18, 2013 | Northwest of Clarksville on Mill Rd. 36°35′59″N 87°25′13″W | Clarksville | Demolished in September, 2012. |

== See also ==
- Woodstock (Trenton, Kentucky): original farm extended into Montgomery County, Tennessee
- List of National Historic Landmarks in Tennessee
- National Register of Historic Places listings in Tennessee
