= Tennessee State Route 237 =

State highway in Tennessee, United States

State Route 237
- Rossview Road
- SR 237 highlighted in red

Route information
- Maintained by TDOT
- Length: 7.9 mi (12.7 km)
- Existed: July 1, 1983–present

Major junctions
- West end: SR 374 in Clarksville
- I-24 in Clarksville
- East end: SR 238 in Port Royal

Location
- Country: United States
- State: Tennessee
- Counties: Montgomery

Highway system
- Tennessee State Routes; Interstate; US; State
← SR 236	→ SR 238

State Route 237 (SR 237) is an east–west secondary state highway located entirely in Montgomery County in Middle Tennessee.

== Route description ==
SR 237 begins at a junction with Warfield Boulevard (SR 374) on the east side of Clarksville. It crosses Interstate 24 (I-24) and ends at a junction with SR 238 north of Port Royal.

== Major intersections ==
The entire route is in Montgomery County.

Location	mi	km	Destinations	Notes
Clarksville	0.0	0.0	SR 374 (Warfield Boulevard)	Western terminus
Clarksville	2.1– 2.3	3.4– 3.7	I-24 – Nashville, Paducah	I-24 exit 8
Port Royal	7.9	12.7	SR 238 (Port Royal Road) – Port Royal State Park, Port Royal	Eastern terminus
1.000 mi = 1.609 km; 1.000 km = 0.621 mi
