= Tennessee State Route 238 =

State highway in Tennessee, United States

State Route 238
- Port Royal Road
- SR 238 highlighted in red

Route information
- Maintained by TDOT
- Length: 8.2 mi (13.2 km)
- Existed: July 1, 1983–present

Major junctions
- South end: SR 76 in Port Royal
- North end: KY 2128 at the Kentucky state line near Guthrie, KY

Location
- Country: United States
- State: Tennessee
- Counties: Montgomery

Highway system
- Tennessee State Routes; Interstate; US; State
← SR 237	→ SR 239

State Route 238 (SR 238) is a north–south secondary state highway located entirely in Montgomery County in Middle Tennessee.

== Route description ==
SR 238 begins at a junction with SR 76 in Port Royal. It goes north to pass through the community and Port Royal State Park, where it crosses a bridge over the Red River. SR 238 then continues north through farmland and has an intersection with SR 237 before coming to an end at the Kentucky state line, becoming Kentucky Route 2128 (KY 2128) just south of US 79 west of Guthrie.

== Major intersections ==
The entire route is in Montgomery County.

Location	mi	km	Destinations	Notes
Port Royal	0.00	0.00	SR 76 – Clarksville, Adams	Southern terminus
Port Royal			Port Royal State Park	
	3.00	4.83	SR 237 west (Rossview Road) – Clarksville	Eastern terminus of SR 237
	8.2	13.2	KY 2128 west (Port Royal Road) to US 79 – Guthrie	Northern terminus at the Kentucky state line
1.000 mi = 1.609 km; 1.000 km = 0.621 mi
