= Sanford Wilson House =

Historic house in Tennessee, United States

- U.S. National Register of Historic Places
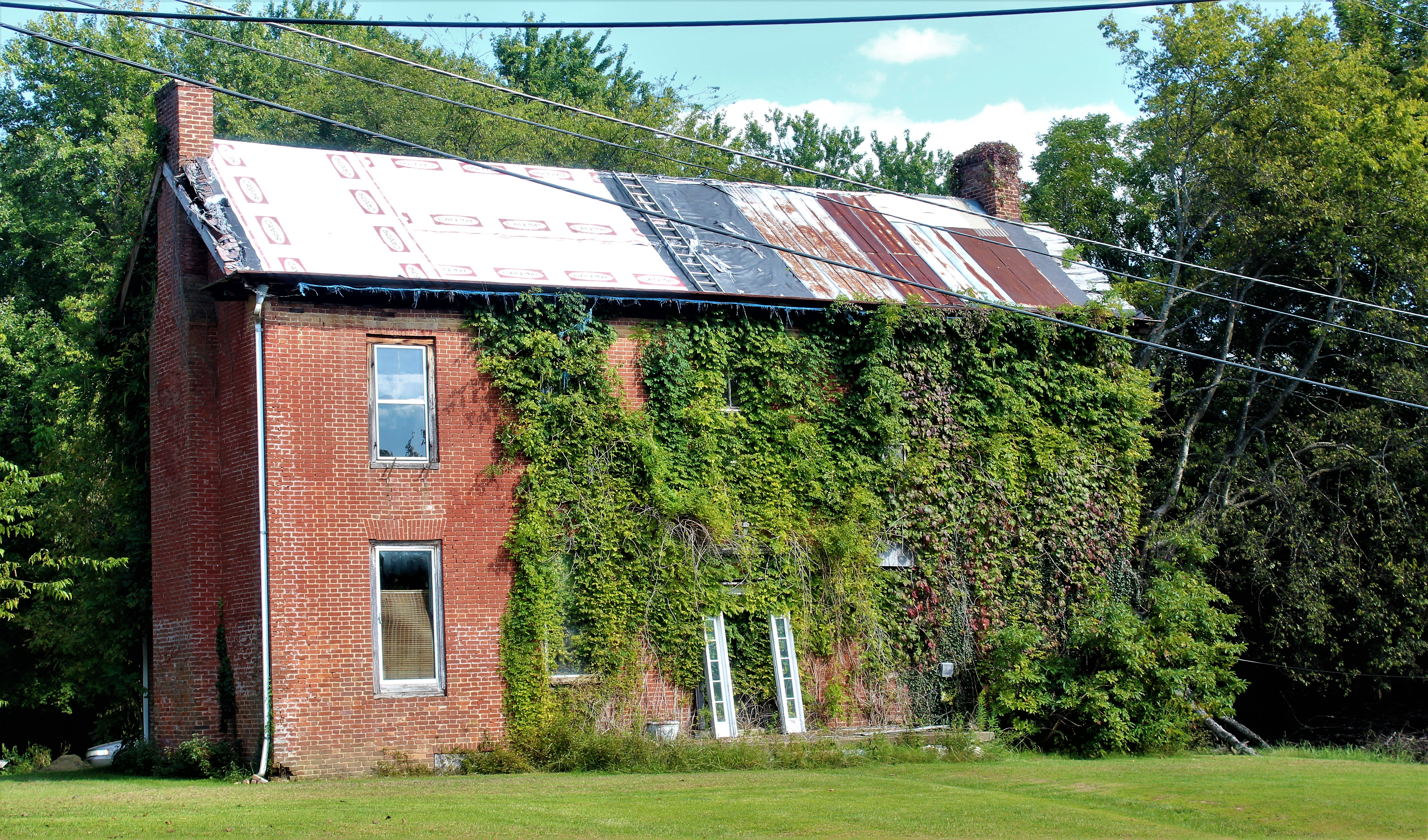
- The house in 2017

- Location within Tennessee
- Location: Old Ashland City Highway, Fredonia, Tennessee
- Coordinates: 36°26′22″N 87°13′08″W
- Area: 1 acre (0.40 ha)
- Built: 1840
- Architectural style: Federal
- NRHP reference No.: 78002623
- Added to NRHP: September 13, 1978

The Sanford Wilson House is a historic house in Montgomery County, Tennessee. It was built in 1840 for Sanford Wilson, a planter and slave owner. It was inherited by his son Samuel in 1848, followed by Samuel's son, also named Samuel, in 1860. The Wilsons remained prosperous after the American Civil War; by 1890, they owned 3,050 acres.

The house was designed in the Federal architectural style. It has been listed on the National Register of Historic Places since September 13, 1978.
