= Bellamy, Tennessee =

Coordinates: 36.48783°N 87.57807°W

Bellamy is a ghost town in Montgomery County, in the U.S. state of Tennessee.

== History ==
A post office was established at Bellamy in 1891, and remained in operation until it was discontinued in 1908. The name Bellamy was likely a family name of pioneer settlers.
