= Ellsworth Faris =

Ellsworth Faris (September 30, 1874 – December 19, 1953) was an influential sociologist of the Chicago school.

Faris was born in 1874 in Salem, Tennessee. He studied at Texas Christian University, where he earned his bachelor's degree in 1894 and master's degree in 1896. From 1897 to 1904, he spent time in Belgian Congo as a missionary. When he returned from Africa, Faris earned his Ph.D. under George Herbert Mead at the University of Chicago, and was hired into the department.

Faris was chair of the Department of Sociology and Anthropology at the University of Chicago, and served as president of the American Sociological Society in 1937. Among his works, Faris authored The Nature of Human Nature in 1937. Herbert Blumer was his doctoral student.

Faris died in Lake Forest, Illinois. He was the father of Robert E. L. Faris, grandfather of Jack Faris, and great grandfather of Robert Faris, all of who became sociologists. Actress Anna Faris is also a grandchild of his.
