= Alfred A. Robb House =

Historic house in Tennessee, United States

- U.S. National Register of Historic Places
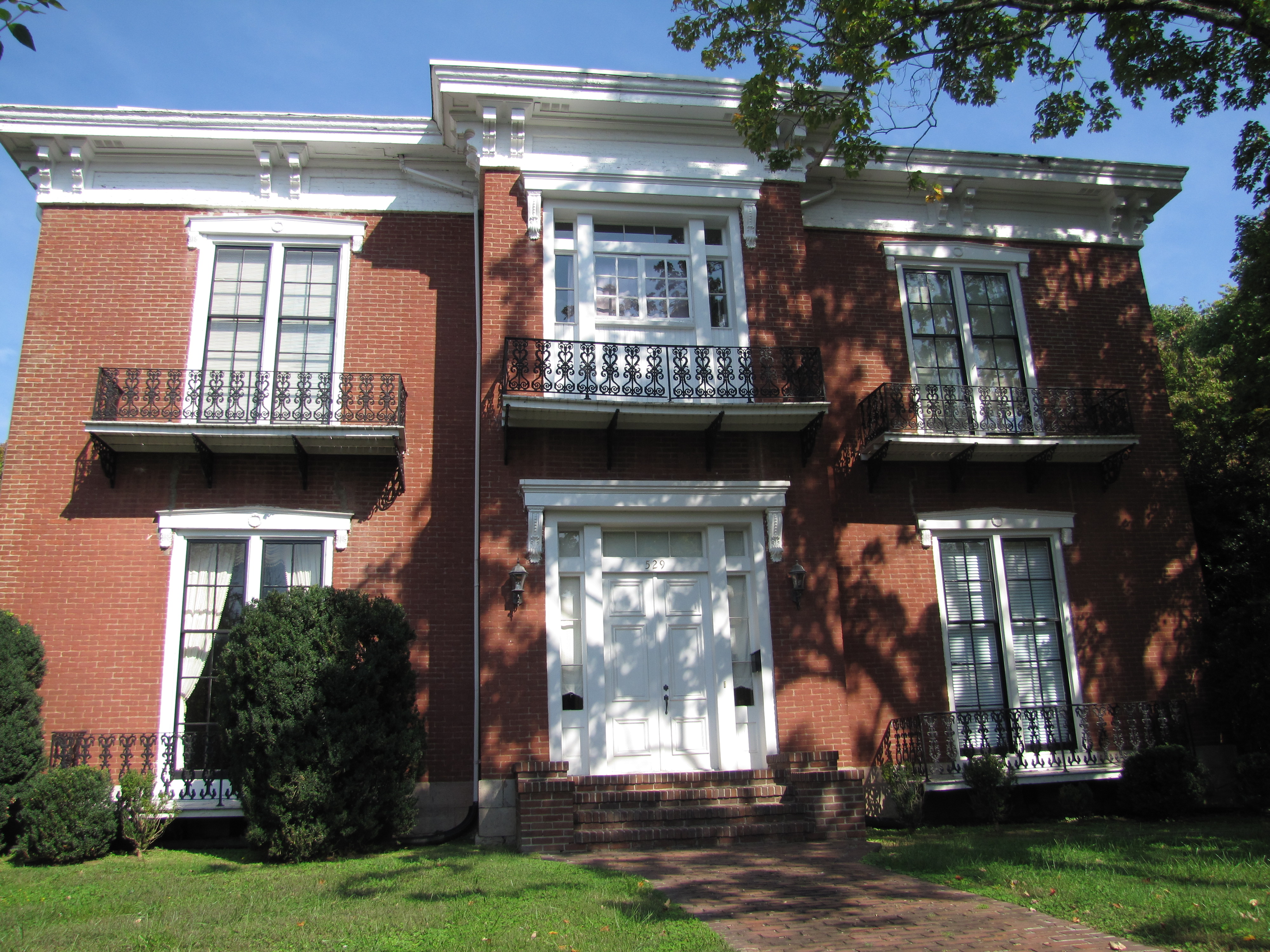
- The Alfred Robb House in 2012

- Location within Tennessee
- Location: 529 York Street, Clarksville, Tennessee
- Coordinates: 36°32′10″N 87°21′35″W
- Area: 2.2 acres (0.89 ha)
- Architectural style: Italianate
- MPS: Clarksville MPS
- NRHP reference No.: 00001162
- Added to NRHP: September 22, 2000

The Alfred A. Robb House is a historic house in Clarksville, Tennessee. It was built in 1859 for Alfred Robb, a graduate of the University of Nashville and lawyer who served on the board of the Masonic College, now known as Austin Peay State University. Robb lived here with his wife, née Mary E. Conrad, and their five children. One of their sons, James E. Bailey, served as a United States Senator from Tennessee from 1877 to 1881.

The house was designed in the Italianate architectural style. It has been listed on the National Register of Historic Places since September 22, 2000.
