= Johnson-Hach House =

- Johnson--Hach House
- U.S. National Register of Historic Places
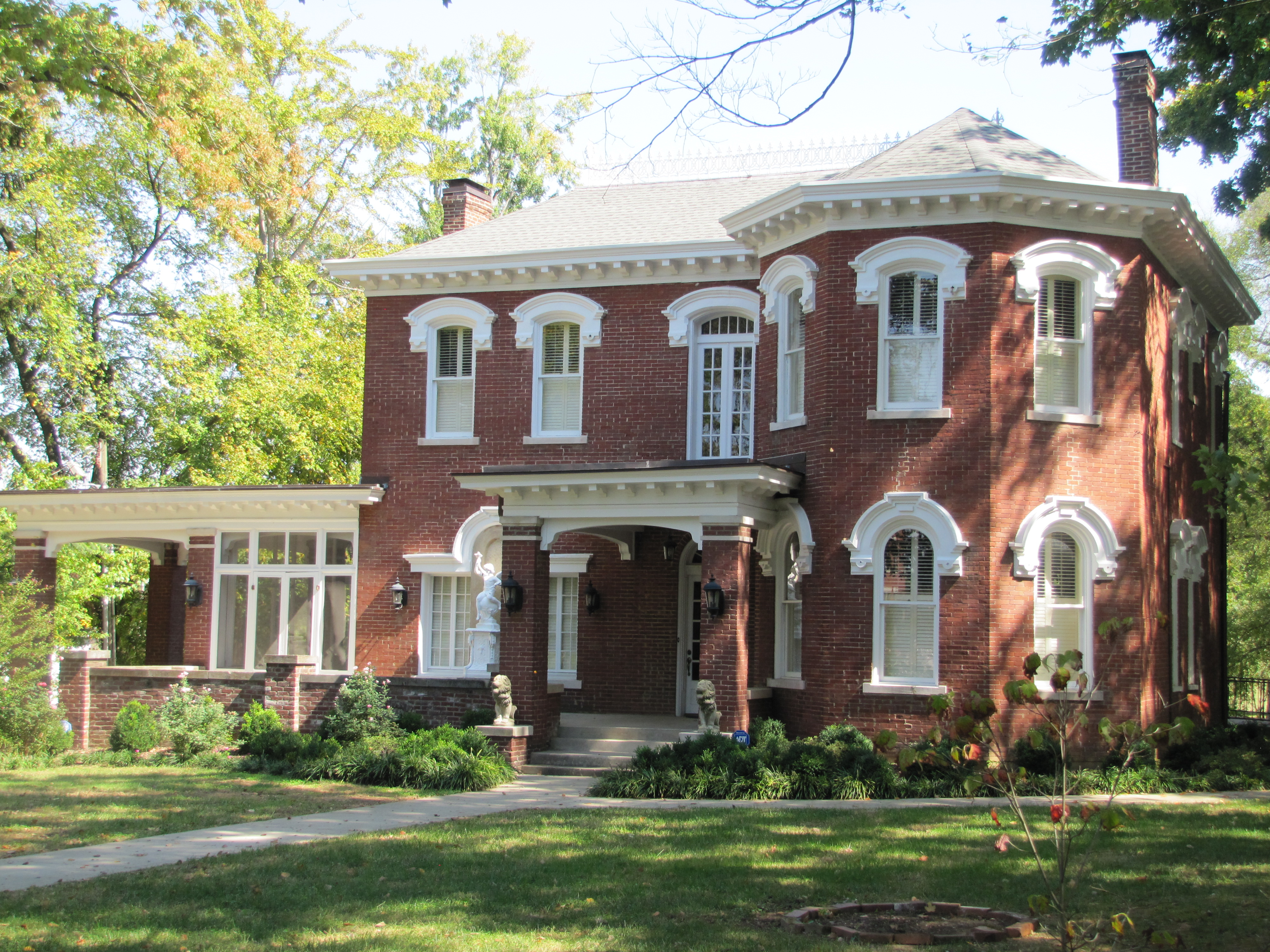
- The Johnson-Hach House in 2012

- Location within Tennessee Location within the United States
- Location: 403 Greenwood Avenue, Clarksville, Tennessee
- Coordinates: 36°31′28″N 87°20′49″W
- Area: 6.7 acres (2.7 ha)
- Built: 1877
- Architect: G. Tandy Smith Jr.
- Architectural style: Italianate, Colonial Revival
- MPS: Clarksville MPS
- NRHP reference No.: 98001507
- Added to NRHP: December 10, 1998

The Johnson-Hach House is a historic house in Clarksville, Tennessee, U.S.. It was built circa 1877 for Polk Grundy Johnson, the son of Congressman Cave Johnson. It was purchased in 1917 by Adolph Hach, a German-born businessman who invested in tobacco production. The house remained in the Hach family until 1992.

The house was designed in the Italianate architectural style, with Colonial Revival features. It has been listed on the National Register of Historic Places since December 10, 1998.
