= Gustavus Adolphus Henry Sr. =

American politician

G. A. Henry
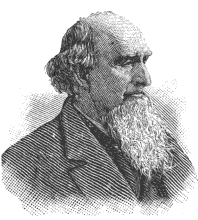

Confederate States Senator from Tennessee
- In office February 18, 1862 – May 10, 1865
- Preceded by: Constituency established
- Succeeded by: Constituency abolished

Personal details
- Born: October 8, 1804 Scott County, Kentucky, U.S.
- Died: September 10, 1880 (aged 75) Clarksville, Tennessee, U.S.
- Party: Whig; Democratic
- Education: Transylvania University

G. A. Henry (born Gustavus Adolphus Henry Sr.; October 4, 1804 – September 10, 1880) was an American politician who served as a Confederate States senator from Tennessee from 1862 to 1865.

== Biography ==
Gustavus Adolphus Henry Sr. was born in 1804. He was the son of Gen. William Henry and Elizabeth Julia (Flournoy) Henry. He was a classmate in law school with Jefferson Davis. He established a practice in Tennessee before the American Civil War. He became a wealthy businessman, owning cotton plantations in Hinds County, Mississippi and Desha County, Arkansas. Affiliated with the Whig Party, he campaigned for Henry Clay. In 1853, he was that party's candidate for governor, losing to Democrat Andrew Johnson by around 2250 votes. He served in the Confederate States of America Senate from 1862 to 1865 and was widely known as the "Eagle Orator of Tennessee." Through his personal friendship with President Davis, he was influential in the Confederate government. As a senator, he was a powerful member of the finance and military committees. Early in the war, the state of Tennessee commissioned the construction of a pair of forts to protect the Tennessee and Cumberland Rivers. The fort on the Tennessee River was named "Fort Henry" in the Senator's honor (see Battle of Fort Henry). He died in 1880.

== Legacy ==
Henry owned Emerald Hill, a large mansion overlooking the Cumberland River in Clarksville, Tennessee now listed in the National Register of Historic Places and serves as the alumni center for the neighboring Austin Peay State University.

Party political offices
Preceded by William B. Campbell	Whig nominee for Governor of Tennessee; 1853	Succeeded by Meredith Poindexter Gentry
Confederate States Senate
New constituency	Confederate States Senator (Class 2) from Tennessee; 1862–1865; Served alongside: Landon Haynes	Constituency abolished
