= Allen House (Clarksville, Tennessee) =

Historic house in Tennessee, United States

- Allendale Farm
- U.S. National Register of Historic Places
- Location within Tennessee
- Nearest city: Clarksville, Tennessee
- Coordinates: 36°36′12″N 87°22′16″W
- Area: 3.9 acres (1.6 ha)
- Built: 1858
- Architectural style: Federal
- NRHP reference No.: 78002619
- Added to NRHP: October 3, 1978

The Allen House, also known as Allendale, is a historic house in Clarksville, Tennessee. It was built in the Antebellum era for the Allen family. It is listed on the National Register of Historic Places.

== History ==
The land, originally spanning 1,475 acres, was acquired by Captain Abraham Allen, a veteran of the American Revolutionary War, in 1796. He built a loghouse circa 1800.

The current house was built by slaves for the Allen family in 1858. In the 1960s, a descendant, Mr Allen, and his wife, née Elizabeth Farmer, raised Hereford cattle and grew tobacco on their 300 acres of land. Their daughter, Amelia, was a competitive equestrian. Remarkably, the property remained in the same family until at least the late 1970s.

== Architectural significance ==
The house was designed in the Federal architectural style. It has been listed on the National Register of Historic Places since October 3, 1978.
