= Emerald Hill (Clarksville, Tennessee) =

- U.S. National Register of Historic Places
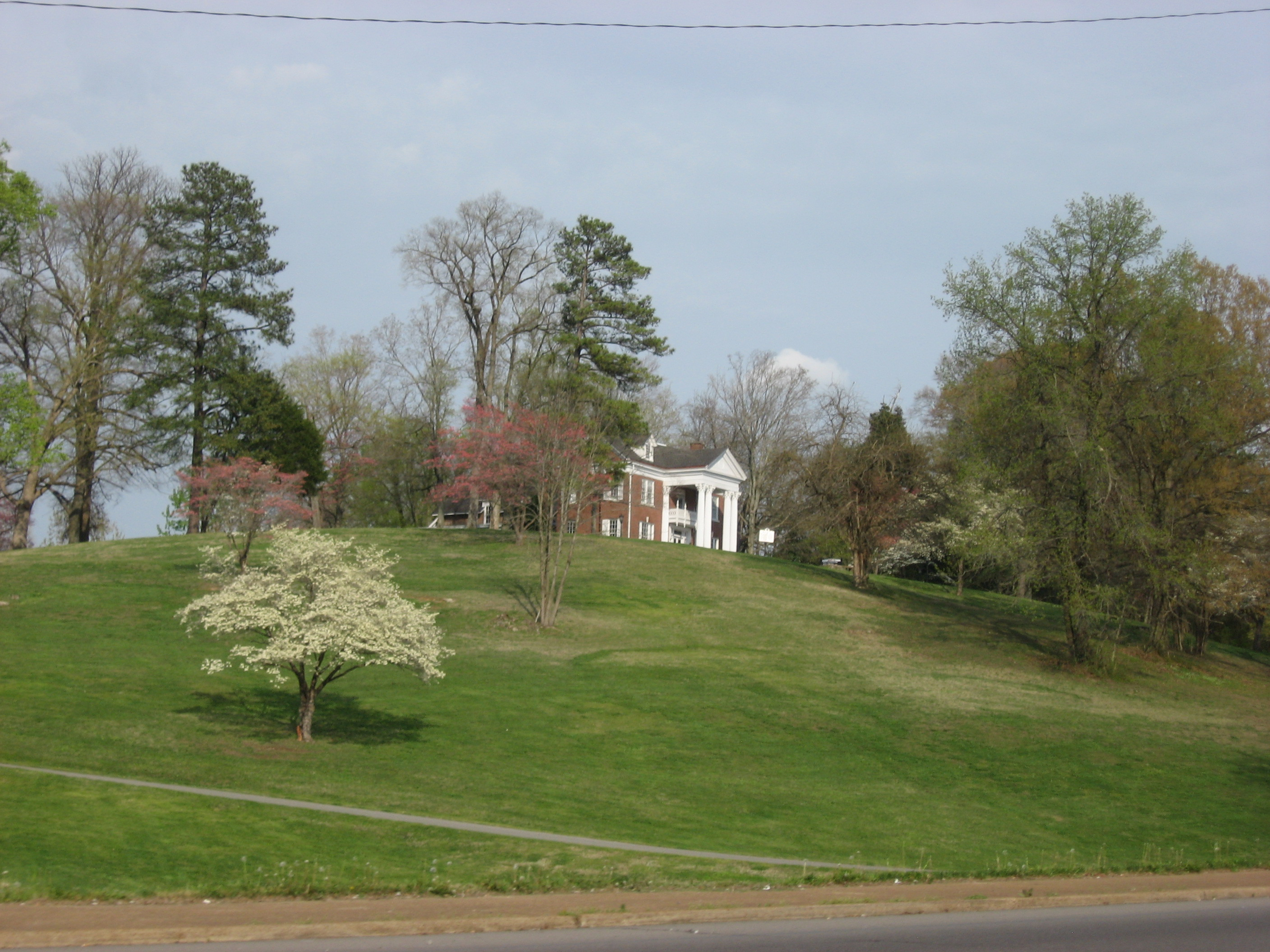

- Location within Tennessee Location within the United States
- Location: North 2nd Street, Clarksville, Tennessee
- Coordinates: 36°31′49″N 87°21′41″W
- Area: 9.9 acres (4.0 ha)
- Built: 1830
- Architectural style: Greek Revival
- NRHP reference No.: 71000826
- Added to NRHP: July 14, 1971

Emerald Hill, also known as Eagle's Nest, is a historic mansion in Clarksville, Tennessee, U.S., built in 1830. The owner, Thomas W. Frazer, donated it to his niece, Marion McClure, the wife of Confederate Senator Gustavus Adolphus Henry Sr., in the 1840s. It was purchased by the Austin Peay State University Alumni Association in 1975.

The house was designed in the Greek Revival architectural style. It has been listed on the National Register of Historic Places since July 14, 1971.
