= Needmore, Tennessee =

Needmore
- Unincorporated community
- Location within Tennessee Location within the United States
- Country: United States
- State: Tennessee
- County: Montgomery
- Time zone: UTC-6 (Central (CST))
  - Summer (DST): UTC-5 (CDT)
- Zip codes: 37040, 37042

Needmore is an unincorporated neighborhood in the county of Montgomery County, Tennessee. The community is characterized by middle-class housing, with one of the prominent features being Clarksville Speedway.

The neighborhood is served by the city's North precinct for police, along with several fire and EMT stations. The neighborhood sits adjacent to the community of Saint Bethlehem, and is in proximity to the local mall and various shopping centers.

In recent years, the area has become characterized for its vast neighborhoods and prime real estate, as prices for family homes remain relatively low but free of crime. The neighborhood is one of the fastest-growing areas in the city, with an estimated ~10,000 residents.
