= Forbes-Mabry House =

- Forbes--Mabry House
- U.S. National Register of Historic Places
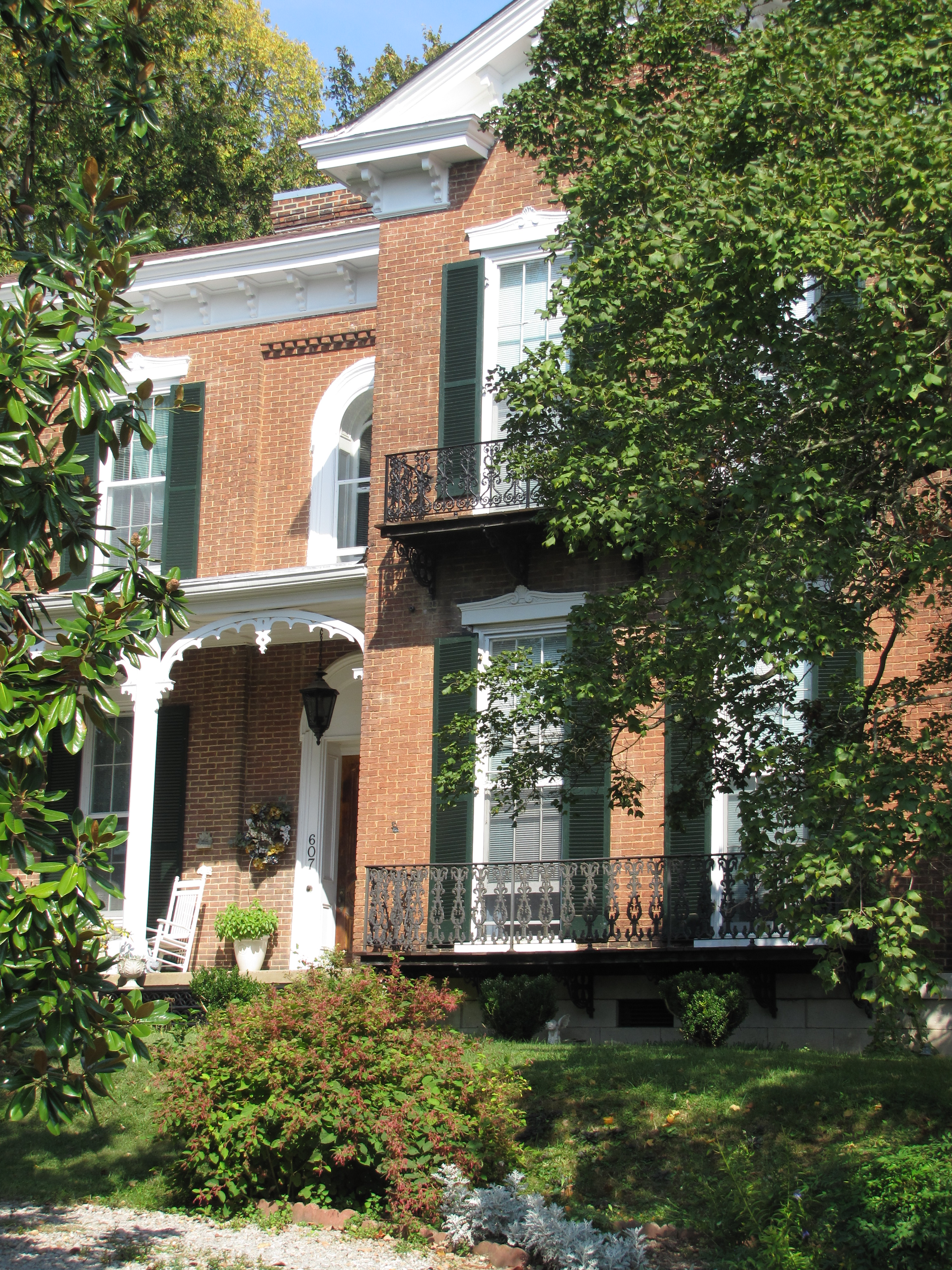
- The house in 2012

- Location within Tennessee Location within the United States
- Location: 607 North Second Street, Clarksville, Tennessee
- Coordinates: 36°32′07″N 87°21′38″W
- Area: less than one acre
- Built: 1859
- Architectural style: Italianate
- NRHP reference No.: 94001544
- Added to NRHP: January 12, 1995

The Forbes-Mabry House is a historic house in Clarksville, Tennessee, U.S..

== History ==
The house was built in 1859 for William A. Forbes, a professor of Mathematics and Natural History at Stewart College, later known as Rhodes College, who was also a tobacco investor and served on the board of the Memphis, Clarksville and Louisville Railroad. During the American Civil War, Forbes joined the Confederate States Army, and he died at the Second Battle of Bull Run.

Congressman Cave Johnson, Mrs. Forbes' step-father, lived in the house with her during the Civil War. His three sons from another marriage also served in the CSA - two of them in the 14th Tennessee Infantry under Col. Forbes. Mrs. Forbes lived in the house until her death in 1891, and it was purchased by Thomas L. Mabry in 1899. It remained in the Mabry family until 1973.

By 2011, it was the residence of Patsy Sharpe, an ornament designer.

== Architectural significance ==
The house was designed in the Italianate architectural style. It has been listed on the National Register of Historic Places since January 12, 1995.
