= Christopher H. Smith House =

Historic house in Tennessee, United States

- U.S. National Register of Historic Places
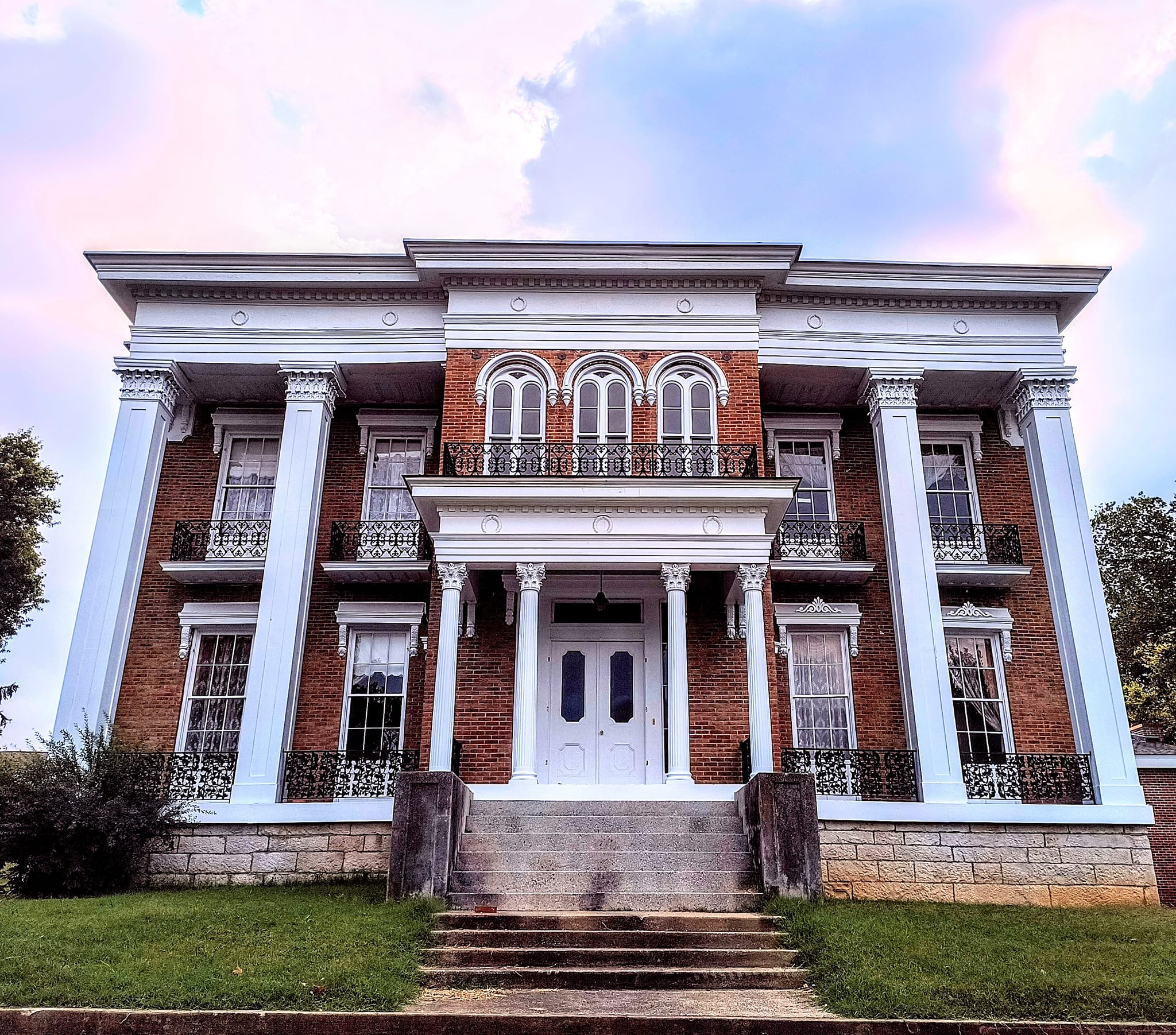

- Location within Tennessee
- Location: Spring and McClure Streets., Clarksville, Tennessee
- Coordinates: 36°32′04″N 87°21′50″W
- Area: 7.3 acres (3.0 ha)
- Built: 1859
- Architectural style: Greek Revival, Italianate
- NRHP reference No.: 88000173
- Added to NRHP: March 8, 1988

The Christopher H. Smith House, also known as the Queen of the Cumberland, is a historic house in Clarksville, Tennessee. It was built in the Antebellum era for a tobacco merchant. It is listed on the National Register of Historic Places.

== History ==
The house was built in 1856-1859 for Christopher Smith, a tobacco merchant. The house remained in the Smith family until 1919.

The house was acquired by the city of Clarskville and repurposed as a community center in 1986.

== Architectural significance ==
The house was designed in the Greek Revival and Italianate architectural styles. It has been listed on the National Register of Historic Places since March 8, 1988.
