= Samuel Rexinger House =

- U.S. National Register of Historic Places
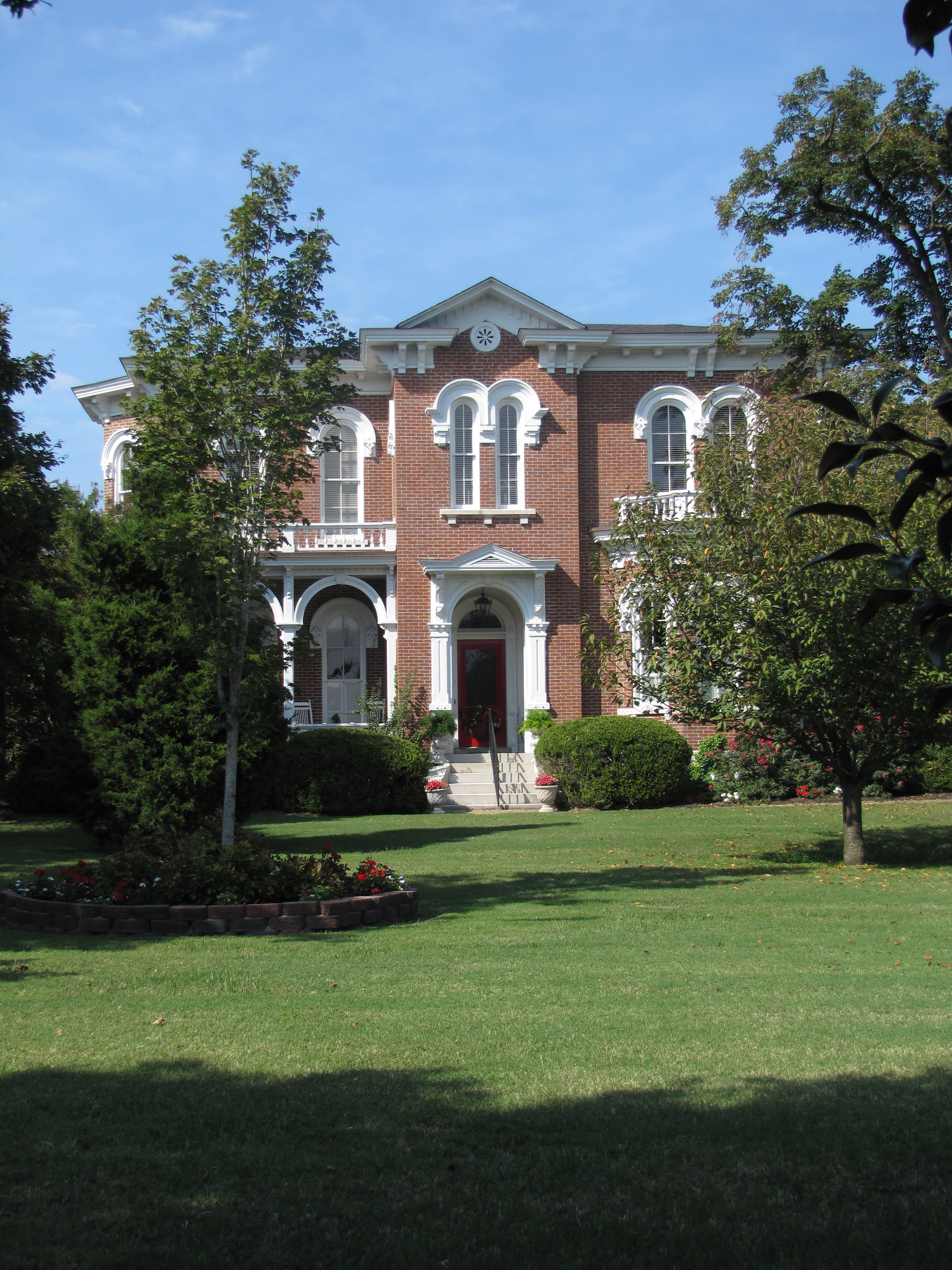

- Location within Tennessee
- Location: 703 E. College Street, Clarksville, Tennessee
- Coordinates: 36°31′55″N 87°21′10″W
- Area: 1 acre (0.40 ha)
- Built: 1878
- Architectural style: Italianate
- NRHP reference No.: 77001284
- Added to NRHP: April 13, 1977

The Samuel Rexinger House, also known as Archwood, is a historic mansion in Clarksville, Tennessee, U.S.. It is the residence of the president of Austin Peay State University.

The house was built in 1878 for Samuel Rexinger, the postmaster of Clarksville from 1867 to 1883. It was later home to professors of the Southwestern Presbyterian University before it was renamed Rhodes College and moved to Memphis. In 1965, the house was purchased by Austin Peay State University to become the university president's residence.

The house was designed in the Italianate architectural style. It has been listed on the National Register of Historic Places since April 13, 1977.
