= Shady Grove, Montgomery County, Tennessee =

Shady Grove, Tennessee
- Unincorporated community
- Location within Tennessee Location within the United States
- Coordinates: 36°27′50″N 87°11′05″W
- Country: United States
- State: Tennessee
- County: Montgomery
- Elevation: 673 ft (205 m)
- Time zone: UTC-6 (Central (CST))
  - Summer (DST): UTC-5 (CDT)
- Area code: 931
- GNIS feature ID: 1315908

Shady Grove is an unincorporated community in Montgomery County, Tennessee, United States. Shady Grove is 10.7 miles (17.2 km) east-southeast of downtown Clarksville.

The community is home to the Shady Grove Free Will Baptist Church. It once had three schools, and was home to a one-room schoolhouse building until 1991, when it was relocated and renovated.
