= Riverview (Clarksville, Tennessee) =

Historic house in Tennessee, United States

- U.S. National Register of Historic Places
- Location within Tennessee
- Nearest city: Clarksville, Tennessee
- Coordinates: 36°30′13″N 87°22′51″W
- Area: 4.5 acres (1.8 ha)
- Built: 1830
- NRHP reference No.: 79002450
- Added to NRHP: March 26, 1979

Riverview is a historic house near Clarksville, Tennessee. It was built in 1830, and it became a writer's retreat for Allen Tate in the 1930s. It is listed on the National Register of Historic Places.

== History ==
The house was built in 1830.

In 1930, the house was purchased by Ben Tate, Allen Tate's brother. Tate was a graduate of Vanderbilt University, English professor and a poet. He wrote Ode to the Confederate Dead in the house. His wife, née Caroline Gordon, wrote the novel Children of Innocence in the house. Literary guests included Donald Davidson, Malcolm Cowley and William Faulkner.

The house has been listed on the National Register of Historic Places since March 26, 1979.
