= New Providence, Tennessee =

Coordinates: 36.5486594°N 87.3791756°W

New Providence was a small railroad town in Montgomery County, Tennessee. It was a mostly working-class city until about the mid-20th century, when it was annexed by the nearby city of Clarksville.

== The 19th century ==
The nineteenth century had the advent of the railroad through New Providence and the nearby hubs of Clarksville and Saint Bethlehem. It brought new industry to the town, and a rise in population. Though it did not compare to that of nearby Clarksville, it fed railroads lines that went to St. Louis, Memphis, Nashville, Chattanooga, Atlanta, and many other major hubs in the southern United States. During the Civil War, the town was a strategic hub, given its railways and proximity to Fort Donelson in Stewart County. After the war, the town began to decline.

== The 20th century ==
The railroads still brought many jobs to the town in the 20th century, but the area paled in comparison to many of its neighboring communities. The two world wars and the building of nearby Fort Campbell had many young men enlisting in the United States Army. During the 1960s, the town was annexed into the city of Clarksville, which now incorporated Clarksville, St. Bethleham, parts of Sango, and other parts of Montgomery County.
