= Tip Top (Clarksville, Tennessee) =

- U.S. National Register of Historic Places
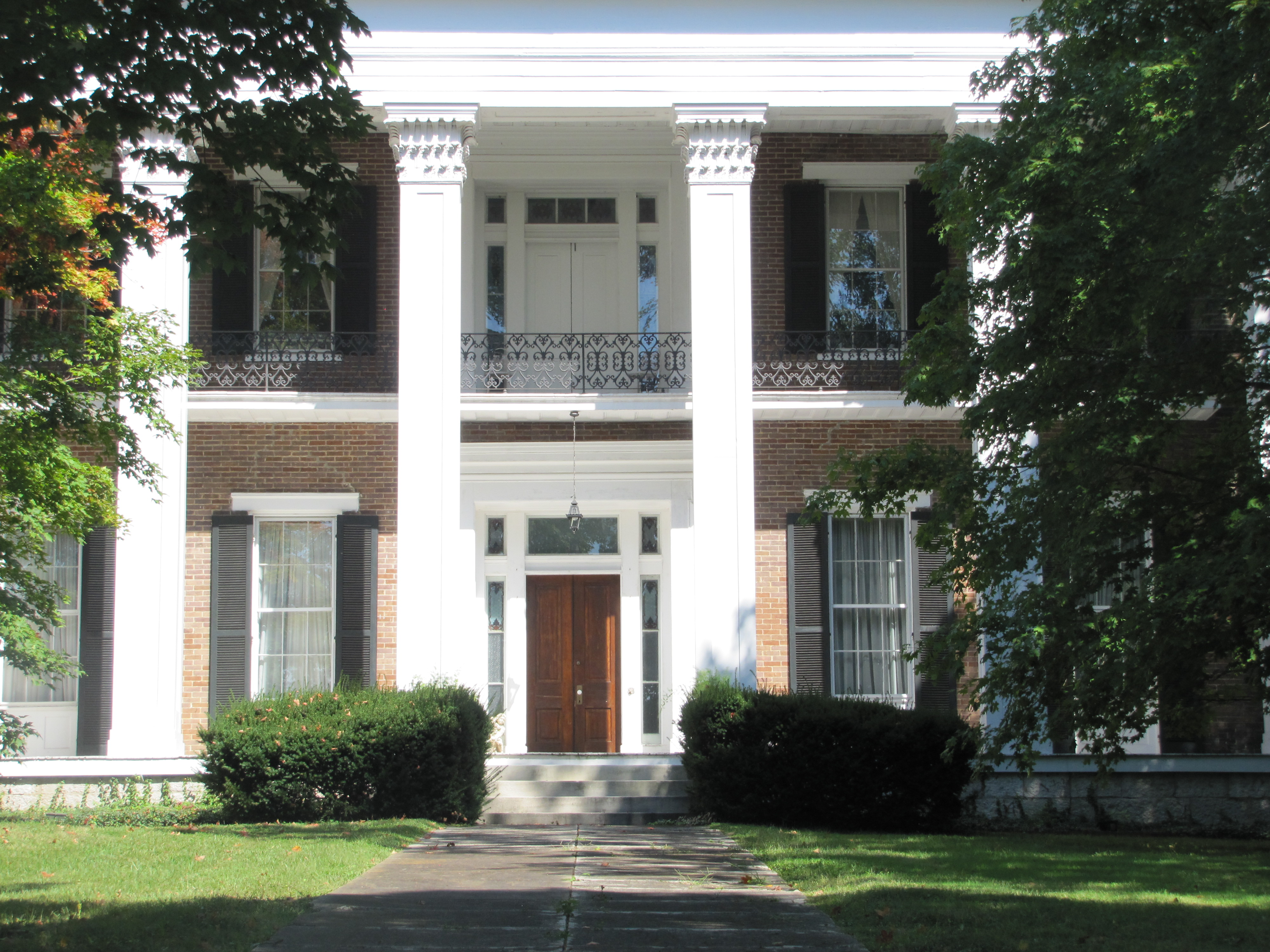

- Location within Tennessee
- Location: 15 Trahern Terrace, Clarksville, Tennessee
- Coordinates: 36°31′29″N 87°20′13″W
- Area: 5 acres (2.0 ha)
- Built: 1859
- Architectural style: Greek Revival, Italianate, Colonial Revival
- NRHP reference No.: 97001566
- Added to NRHP: July 15, 1998

Tip Top is a historic mansion in Clarksville, Tennessee. It was built in 1859 for J. P. Williams, a "tobacconist". It was the residence of Governor Malcolm Patterson from 1909 to 1912, until it was purchased by the Trahern family.

The two-story house was designed in the Greek Revival architectural style, with some Italianate influences, including paired brackets under its eaves and grilled ironwork. Its interior was later modified Colonial Revival stylings. It has been listed on the National Register of Historic Places since July 15, 1998.
