= White Chapel (Rossview, Tennessee) =

Historic church in Tennessee, United States

- U.S. National Register of Historic Places
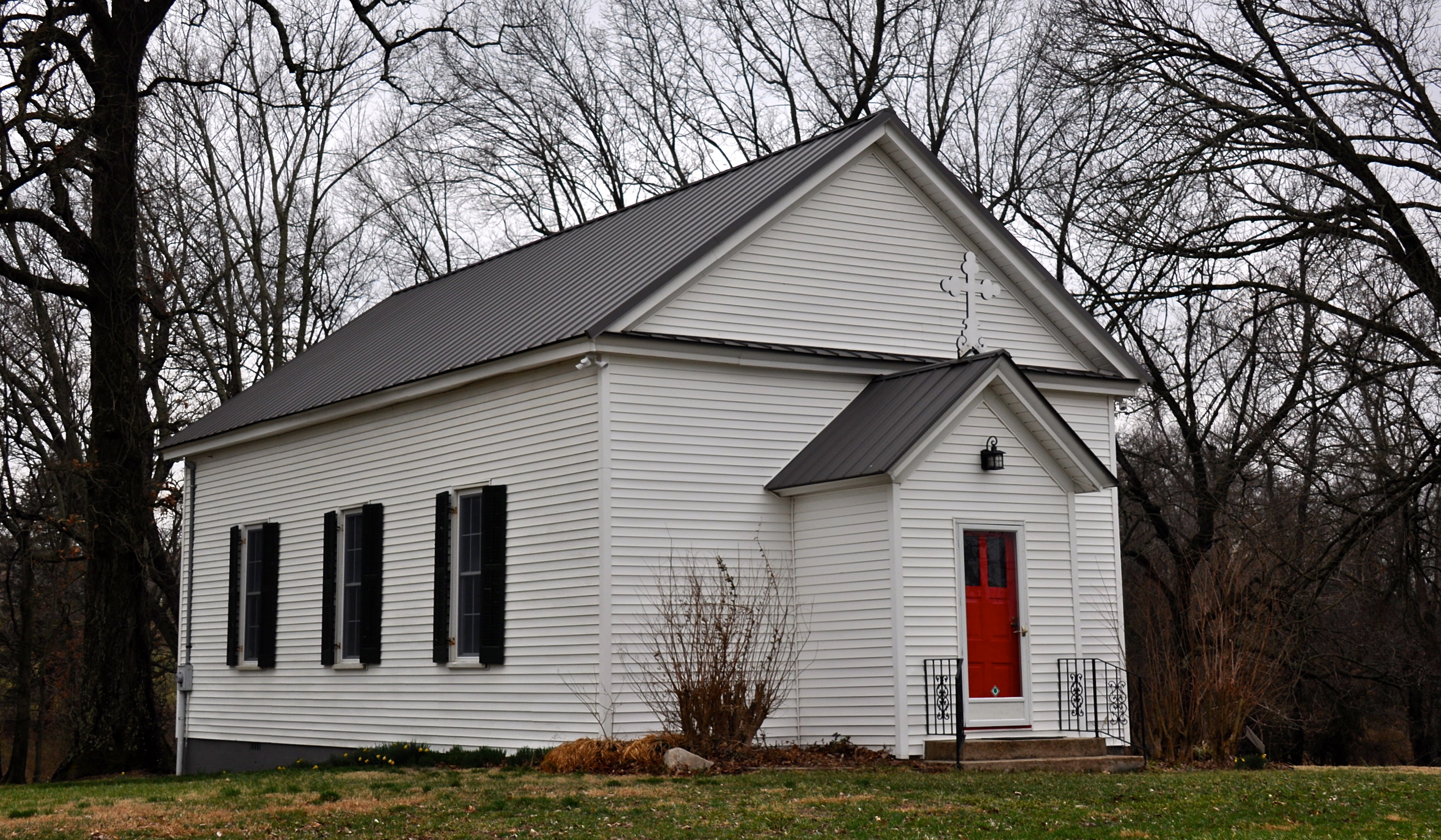
- White Chapel, March 2014.

- Location within Tennessee Location within the United States
- Location: Rossview Rd., Rossview, Tennessee
- Coordinates: 36°33′43″N 87°13′40″W
- Area: 5 acres (2.0 ha)
- Built: 1866
- Architect: Ross, Edward B.
- NRHP reference No.: 86001395
- Added to NRHP: June 26, 1986

White Chapel or Grace Chapel is a historic church on Rossview Road in Rossview, Tennessee.

It was established in the 1860s as a mission Sunday school for local children and served all Christian denominations. The frame building that houses the church was built in 1866 and added to the National Register of Historic Places in 1986.
