= South Guthrie, Tennessee =

- Unincorporated community
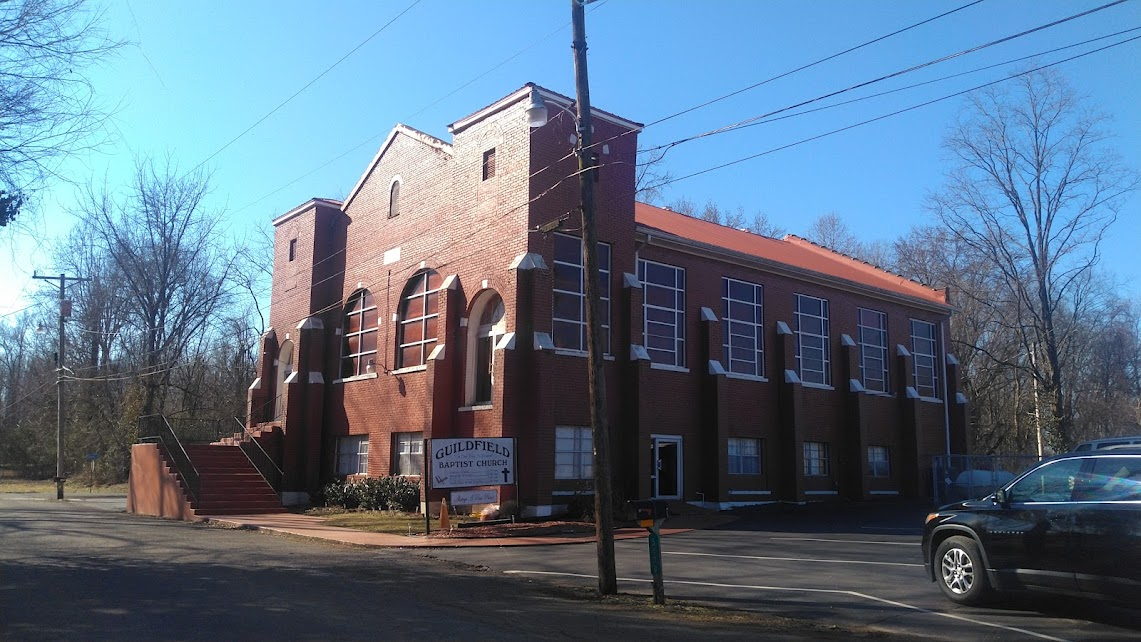
- The Guildfield Missionary Baptist Church located in the community.

- Location within Tennessee Location within the United States
- Coordinates: 36.641088°N 87.168289°W
- Country: United States
- State: Tennessee
- County: Montgomery
- Time zone: UTC-6 (Central (CST))
  - Summer (DST): UTC-5 (CDT)
- Area code: 931

South Guthrie is an unincorporated rural community in Montgomery County, Tennessee, immediately south of the Kentucky state line.

== Geography ==
South Guthrie is adjacent to the city of Guthrie, Kentucky; essentially, it is the part of the Guthrie community located south of the state line. U.S. 41 is the primary route through the community.

== History ==
In the Jim Crow era, South Guthrie was the African-American community associated with the white city of Guthrie, with the state line forming a dividing line between the two.

The community of Guthrie was established in 1868 and experienced early growth after a railroad junction was completed in 1870. South Guthrie, which grew up alongside Guthrie, was originally known as "Squig" according to local resident Clyde C. Kilgore. It was also known by the nicknames "Squiggtown" and "Niggertown", the latter being a pejorative used by white residents of Guthrie. Squig became known as "South Guthrie" around the time the South Guthrie Community Improvement Association raised US$27.85 for a gate to enclose the cemetery.

In the early decades of the 20th century, residents of South Guthrie found industrial employment in a broom factory and a plant that made railroad ties. South Guthrie also had a small middle class of African-American professionals and benefited economically from African-American tobacco farmers in the surrounding "Black Patch" region.

South Guthrie is still predominantly black, while Guthrie is predominantly white, although the divisions are no longer as sharply defined.

The building that houses the South Guthrie community center was a Rosenwald school from construction in 1922 until 1968. It is the only surviving Rosenwald school building in Montgomery County out of the 22 once there. The Guildfield Missionary Baptist Church, also built in 1922, is listed on the National Register of Historic Places.
