= Guildfield Missionary Baptist Church =

Historic church in Tennessee, United States

- U.S. National Register of Historic Places
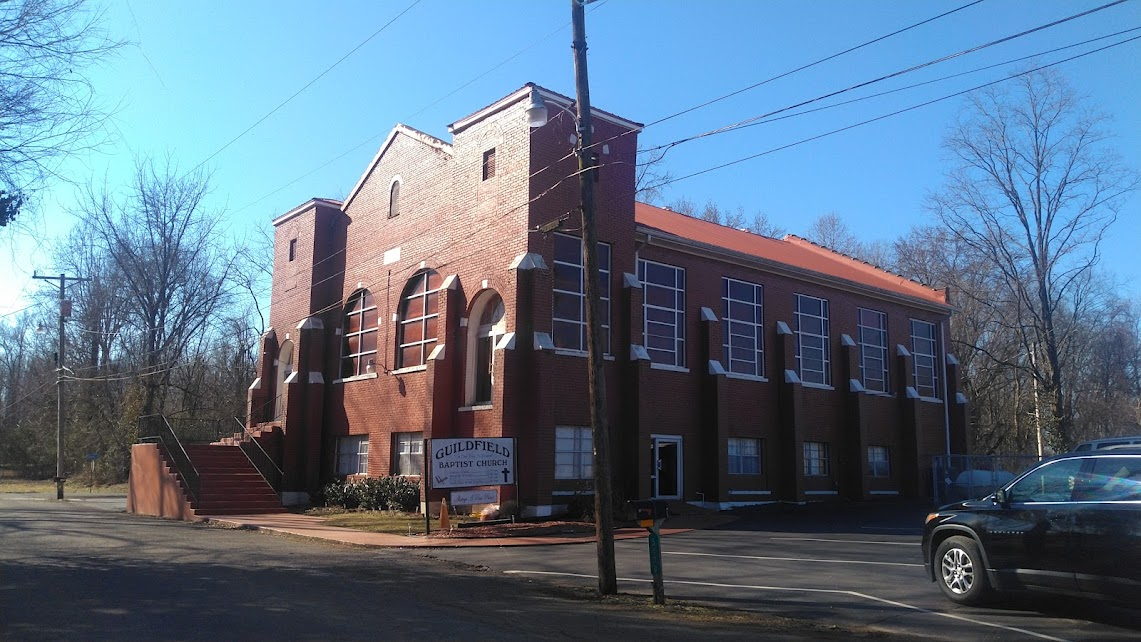

- Location within Tennessee Location within the United States
- Location: Guildfield Church Rd., South Guthrie, Tennessee
- Coordinates: 36°38′25″N 87°10′19″W
- Area: less than one acre
- Built: 1922
- Architectural style: Romanesque Revival
- MPS: Rural African-American Churches in Tennessee MPS
- NRHP reference No.: 03000151
- Added to NRHP: March 24, 2003

Guildfield Missionary Baptist Church is a historic African-American church on Guildfield Church Road in South Guthrie, Tennessee.

The congregation was started in 1868 with meetings at a home in South Guthrie. It was formally organized in 1869 and affiliated with the Consolidated American Missionary Baptist Convention, a forerunner to the National Baptist Convention. Land for a church was acquired in 1871. The congregation completed a new frame church building before 1882. It was replaced at the same location by a second frame building in the 1880s and a third frame church in the 1890s.

The church building was completed in 1922, replacing the building at the same location that had been built in the 1890s. Church deacon Edward Warfield raised much of the money for construction of the new church. In the same year, Warfield also led a successful community fund-raising effort for building of a new Rosenwald school to replace a black school in South Guthrie that was destroyed by a tornado. The $500 raised in the local African American community was combined with $300 from the Rosenwald Fund and $700 from government sources to pay for construction of a two-teacher Rosenwald school, also completed in 1922. The school, which came to be known as the Warfield School, currently houses a community center.

The church is a two-story brick building on a concrete foundation with a gable-front entrance. Romanesque Revival elements are prominent in its design. There are two large Romanesque arched colored glass windows in the center of its eastern facade, flanked on either side by brick towers with double doorways in the shape of Romanesque arches. Brick buttresses with triangular white capstones are on the north and south corners of the towers and on the building's long north and side walls. The church's red brick walls have been painted red since 1980.

The building was listed on the National Register of Historic Places in 2003. Its size and architecture are unusual for an African-American church of its era. In the National Register nomination, historian Carroll Van West wrote that no other extant rural African-American church in Middle Tennessee "match[ed] the size, the brick masonry, and architectural distinctiveness of this building."
