= Bethlehem Methodist Church and Cemetery =

Historic site in Montgomery County, Tennessee

- U.S. National Register of Historic Places
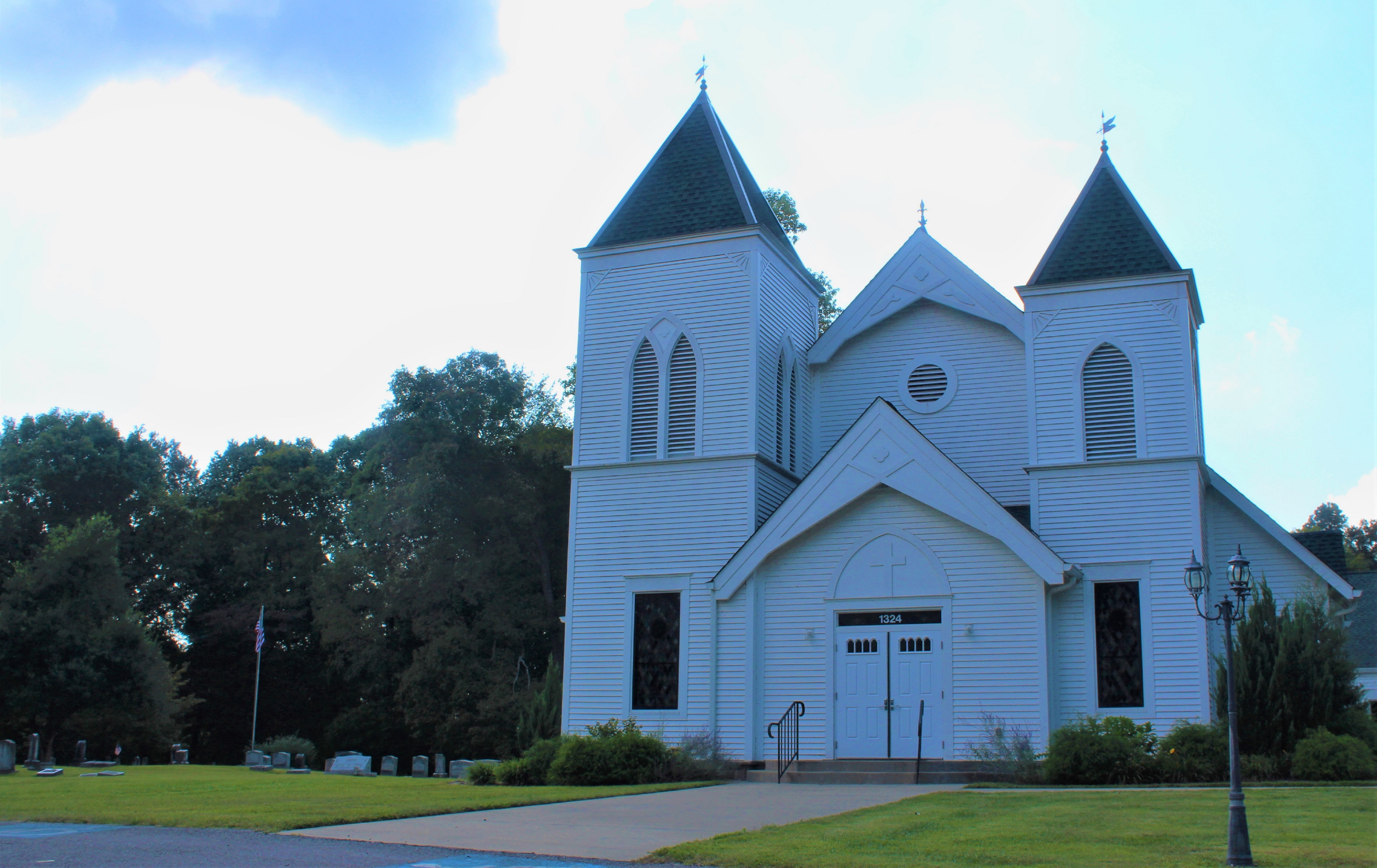

- Location within Tennessee Location within the United States
- Nearest city: Clarksville, Tennessee
- Coordinates: 36°27′52″N 87°16′33″W
- Area: 3 acres (1.2 ha)
- Built: 1899-1900
- Architect: Simpson, Alex F.
- Architectural style: Late Gothic Revival
- NRHP reference No.: 94000576
- Added to NRHP: June 10, 1994

Bethlehem Methodist Church (Bethlehem United Methodist) is a historic church located on Gholson Road southeast of Clarksville, Tennessee. Construction on the church began in 1899, and it was dedicated in 1900. The church was the second building used by its congregation, which originally met in a log church that also served as a school. The congregation had met since at least 1836, the year of its first records; however, the oldest graves in the church cemetery date back to 1821.

Carpenter Alex F. Simpson planned the Gothic Revival church. The one-story frame church features a square tower at both of the front corners. Each tower has a louvered lancet arch window above the first story, which is demarcated by a belt course; the towers are both topped by pyramidal spires with finials. A bargeboard with decorative moldings covers the gable between the two towers; the front entrance, added below the gable in 1958, features a matching bargeboard. The sides of the church each feature three lancet arch windows; while the windows originally had plain glass, stained glass was installed in 1981.

The church was added to the National Register of Historic Places on June 10, 1994. The church's adjacent cemetery is a contributing property to its listing; in addition to its historical association with the church, it contains historically significant boxed grave markers.
