= Catholic Church and Rectory =

Historic church in Tennessee, United States

- U.S. National Register of Historic Places
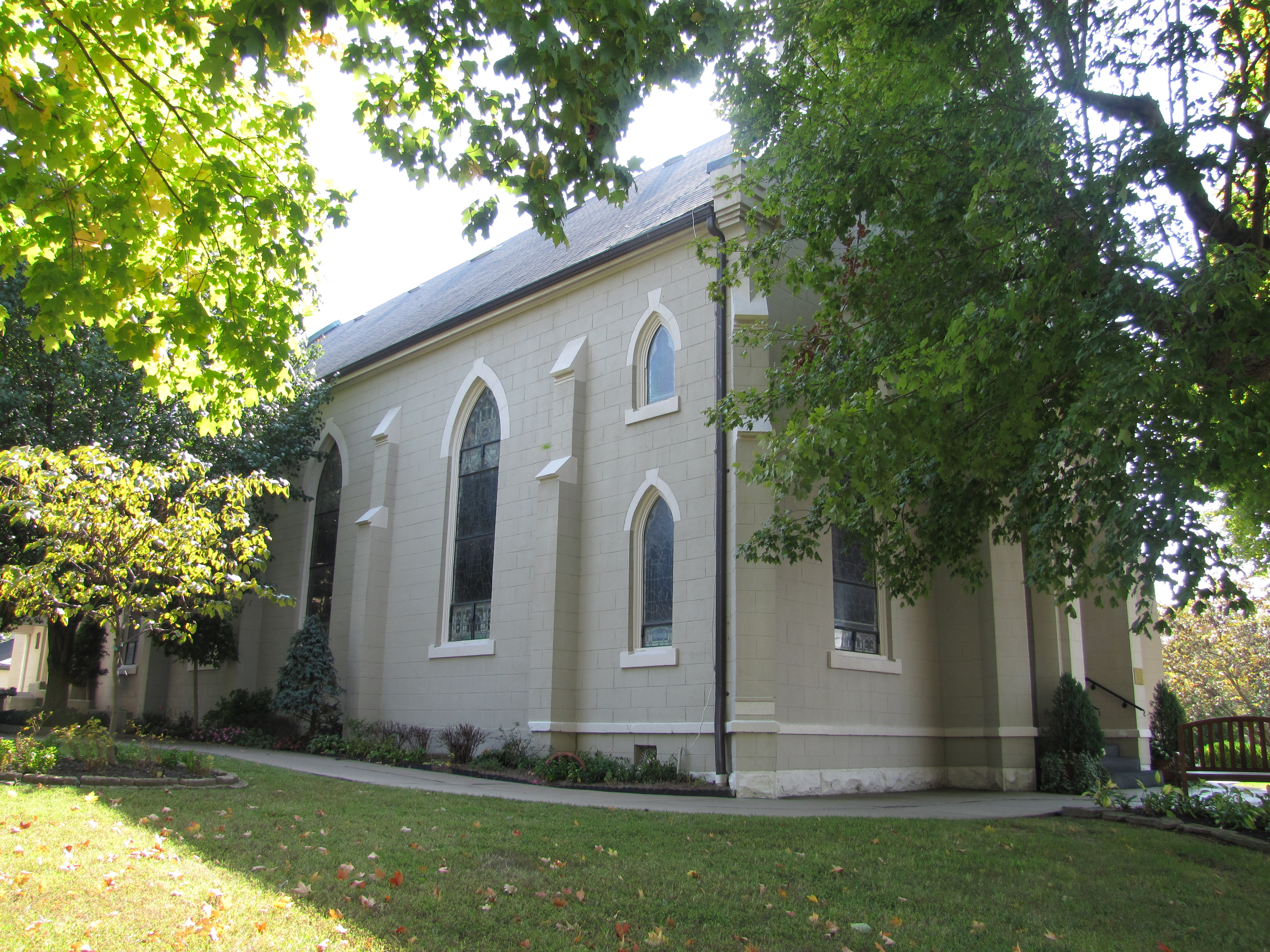
- The front of the church

- Location within Tennessee Location within the United States
- Location: 716 Franklin St., Clarksville, Tennessee
- Coordinates: 36°31′44″N 87°21′3″W
- Area: 3.2 acres (1.3 ha)
- Built: 1880
- Architect: Rosenplanter, C.G.
- Architectural style: Gothic
- MPS: Nineteenth Century Churches in Clarksville TR
- NRHP reference No.: 82004032
- Added to NRHP: August 2, 1982

Catholic Church and Rectory, formally The Immaculate Conception Church, is a historic Roman Catholic church at 716 Franklin Street in Clarksville, Tennessee.

The Gothic style building was constructed in 1880, and added to the National Register of Historic Places in 1982.
