= Madison Street Methodist Church =

Historic church in Tennessee, United States

- Madison Street United Methodist Church
- U.S. National Register of Historic Places
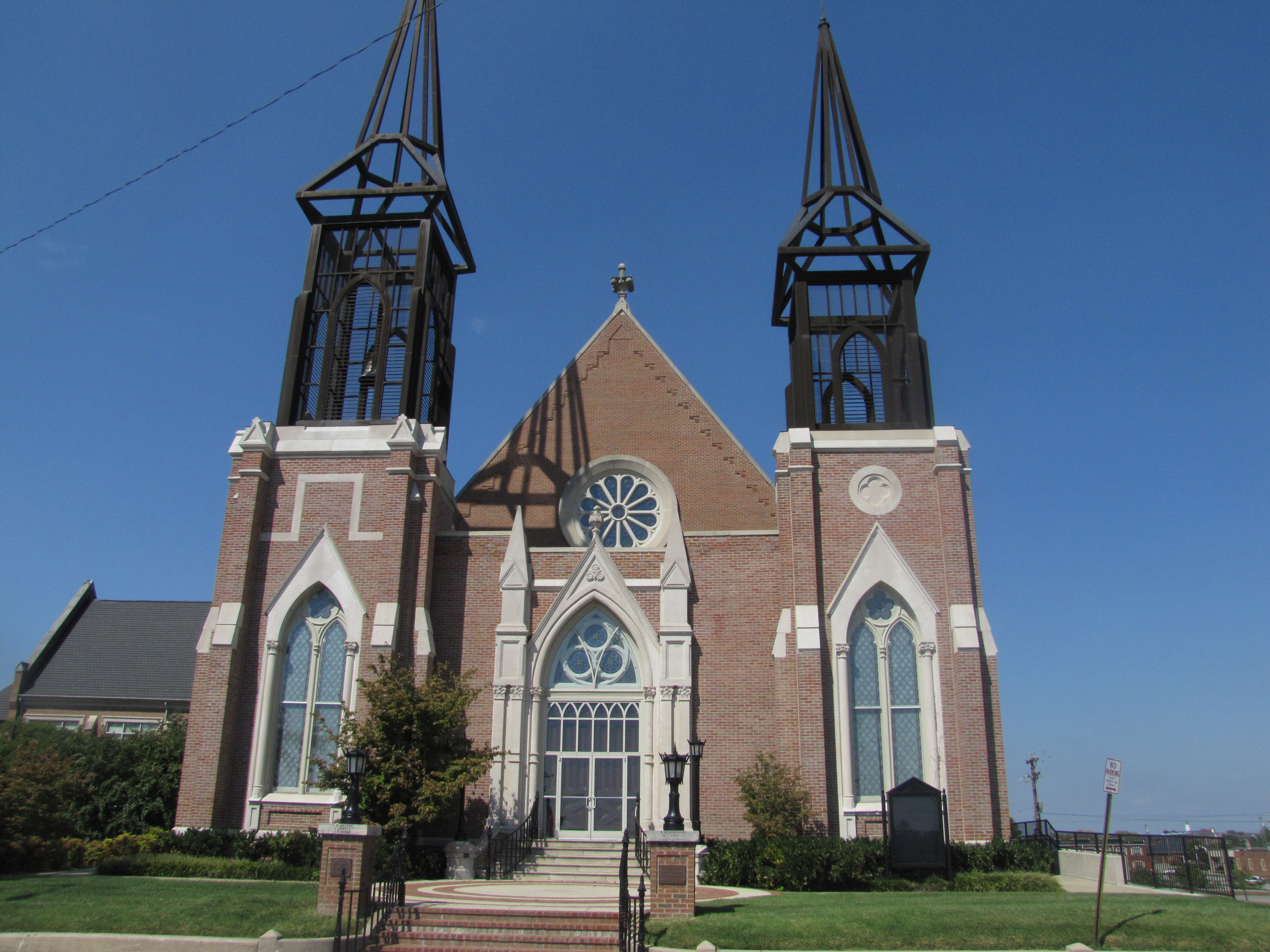

- Location within Tennessee Location within the United States
- Location: 319 Madison St., Clarksville, Tennessee
- Coordinates: 36°31′32.23″N 87°21′22.72″W
- Area: 1.5 acres (0.61 ha)
- Built: 1882
- Architect: Roseplanter, C.G.
- Architectural style: Gothic
- Website: https://madisonstreetumc.org/
- MPS: Nineteenth Century Churches in Clarksville TR (AD)
- NRHP reference No.: 76001794
- Added to NRHP: May 13, 1976

Madison Street United Methodist Church is a historic church at 319 Madison Street in Clarksville, Tennessee. The church is a brown brick building that exemplifies Gothic architecture of the Victorian era. It was listed on the National Register of Historic Places in 1976.

It is a fellowship of the United Methodist Church.

== History ==
Prior to the construction of the Madison Street location, worship of the local body of Methodists that would become the congregation of Madison Street UMC commenced in 1831 when the first brick church was constructed on Main Street. This location was later outgrown by the congregation and the fellowship moved to a larger building on Franklin Street. This location was soon outgrown as well, and construction began on the Madison Street church building on September 26, 1882.

This church was established as Madison Street Methodist Church, South. The church fellowship has remained at this location since this date, with various additions being made to the original 1882 structure.

Much of the original structure, including the sanctuary and iconic twin steeples, was destroyed by an F3 tornado which struck downtown Clarksville on January 22, 1999. The church was rebuilt in 2000 by Everton Oglesby Architects who paid homage to the original structure but did not reconstruct the building exactly as it had been pre-1999. Most notably, the steeples were replaced with copper-clad, structural steel outlines of the original towers.
