= Northington-Beach House =

- Northington--Beach House
- U.S. National Register of Historic Places
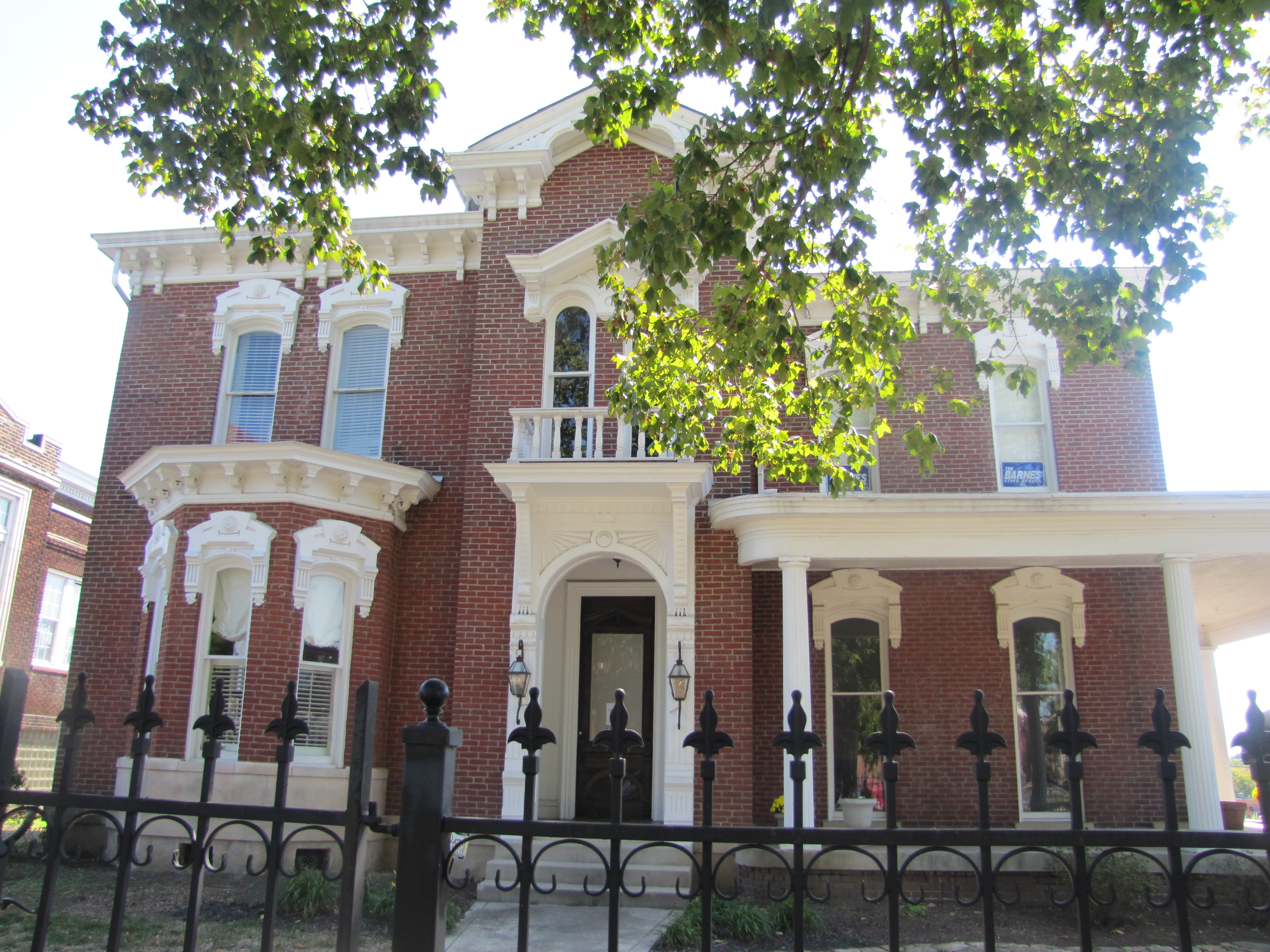

- Location within Tennessee Location within the United States
- Location: 512 Madison Street, Clarksville, Tennessee
- Coordinates: 36°31′33″N 87°21′15″W
- Area: less than one acre
- Built: 1886, 1925
- Architectural style: Italianate, Colonial Revival
- MPS: Clarksville MPS
- NRHP reference No.: 01000758
- Added to NRHP: July 19, 2001

The Northington-Beach House is a historic mansion in Clarksville, Tennessee, U.S.. It was built in 1886 for Michael C. Northington, a tobacco merchant who served as the mayor of Clarskville from 1906 to 1910. In 1925, it was purchased by Oscar Beach, the founder of the Pan-American Oil Company.

The two-story house was designed in the Italianate architectural style. A Colonial Revival-style porch was added in 1925. It has been listed on the National Register of Historic Places since July 19, 2001.
