= Salem, Tennessee =

Unincorporated community in Tennessee, US

Coordinates: 35.8092325°N 86.4772144°W

Salem is an unincorporated community in Rutherford County, in the U.S. state of Tennessee.

== History ==
Salem was laid out on the Salem and Eagleville Pike. A post office called Salem Cross Roads was established in 1839, and closed in 1840.

However, in the 1800s to the mid-1900s or so, there was a place called spoken of at the Salem community in or near Birchwood, Tennessee.
