= Montgomery County, Tennessee =

County in Tennessee, United States

- County
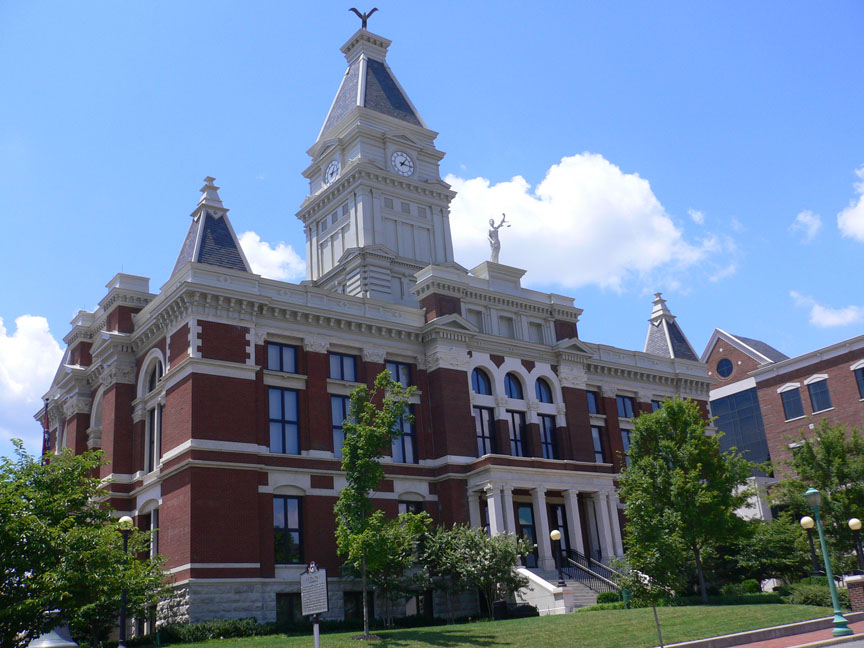
- Montgomery County Courthouse in Clarksville

- Seal Logo

- Location within the U.S. state of Tennessee
- Coordinates: 36°30′N 87°23′W
- Country: United States
- State: Tennessee
- Founded: April 9, 1796
- Named for: John Montgomery
- Seat: Clarksville
- Largest city: Clarksville

Government
  - Mayor: Wes Golden (R)

Area
  - Total: 544 sq mi (1,410 km^{2})
  - Land: 539 sq mi (1,400 km^{2})
  - Water: 4.7 sq mi (12 km^{2}) 0.9%

Population (2020)
  - Total: 220,069
  - Estimate (2025): 249,935 ▲
  - Density: 408/sq mi (158/km^{2})
- Time zone: UTC−6 (Central)
  - Summer (DST): UTC−5 (CDT)
- Area code: 931
- Congressional district: 7th
- Website: montgomerytn.gov

Montgomery County is a county in the U.S. state of Tennessee. As of the 2020 United States census, the population was 220,069. The county seat and only incorporated municipality is Clarksville. The county was created in 1796. Montgomery County is included in the Clarksville, TN–KY Metropolitan Statistical Area.

== History ==
The county was named for John Montgomery, a soldier in the American Revolutionary War and an early settler who founded the city of Clarksville. It was authorized on April 9, 1796, when the western portion of Tennessee County, which since 1790 had been part of the Territory South of the River Ohio, became part of the new state of Tennessee. (In 1790, North Carolina had ceded its western lands to the Federal government to create what was also known as the Southwest Territory.) The eastern portion of old Tennessee County was, at the same time Montgomery County was formed, combined with land taken from Sumner County to form Robertson County, Tennessee. Later acts of the Tennessee General Assembly had further reduced Montgomery County by 1871 to its current size and boundaries.

Montgomery County was the site of several early saltpeter mines. Saltpeter is the main ingredient of gunpowder and was obtained by leaching the earth from local caves. Bellamy Cave near Stringtown still contains the remains of two dozen saltpeter leaching vats. It appears to have been a large operation. Cooper Creek Cave shows evidence of extensive mining and contains the remains of "many saltpeter hoppers." Both were probably mined during the War of 1812. Dunbar Cave is reported to have been mined for saltpeter during the Mexican War of 1848, but commercial development has destroyed any evidence of this. Little mining is likely to have happened here during the Civil War, since the Union Army captured and occupied this part of Tennessee in early 1862.

== Geography ==
Interactive map of Montgomery County

Montgomery County lies on the northern line of Tennessee; its northern border abuts the state of Kentucky. The hilly terrain is marked by drainages and largely covered with trees. The Cumberland River meanders westward through the lower central part of the county. The highest point on the county terrain (806 feet/246 meters ASL) is a small hill 3.7 miles (6.0 km) ENE from Slayden in Dickson County.

According to the US Census Bureau, the county has a total area of 544 square miles (1,410 km^{2}), of which 539 square miles (1,400 km^{2}) is land and 4.7 square miles (12 km^{2}) (0.9%) is water.

=== Dunbar Cave ===
Montgomery County lies in a region of well-developed karst topography. A large cave system under the county is named Dunbar Cave; it is the centerpiece of Dunbar Cave State Park, which encompasses approximately 110 acres and is one of the most visited units in the Tennessee State Park System.

Dunbar Cave was extensively used by prehistoric Indians, who inhabited this area for thousands of years before European encounters. Remains of their cane torches have been found in the cave, and archaeologists have excavated numerous artifacts inside the entrance. During a research trip into the cave on January 15, 2005, Park Ranger Amy Wallace, History professor Joe Douglas, local historian Billyfrank Morrison, and Geologist Larry E. Matthews discovered Indian glyphs on the walls of the cave. Subsequent investigations by archaeologists from the University of Tennessee at Knoxville confirmed the drawings were from people of the Mississippian culture, which was active about 1000-1300 CE. These glyphs were featured for a few years on the tour of the cave.

In 2010, the State of Tennessee closed Dunbar Cave to the public because White Nose Syndrome was diagnosed in a bat, and they did not want the disease to spread. The cave has since reopened, and tours are conducted seasonally, from May to August (with special hygiene procedures in place).

=== Adjacent counties ===
- Christian County, Kentucky – northwest
- Todd County, Kentucky – northeast
- Robertson County – east
- Cheatham County – southeast
- Dickson County – south
- Houston County – southwest
- Stewart County – west

=== Protected areas ===
- Barnett's Woods State Natural Area
- Dunbar Cave State Natural Area
- Dunbar Cave State Park
- Haynes Bottom Wildlife Management Area
- Port Royal State Park (part)
- Shelton Ferry Wildlife Management Area

== Demographics ==
Historical population
Census	Pop.	Note	%±
1800	2,899		—
1810	8,021		176.7%
1820	12,219		52.3%
1830	14,349		17.4%
1840	16,927		18.0%
1850	21,045		24.3%
1860	20,895		−0.7%
1870	24,747		18.4%
1880	28,481		15.1%
1890	29,697		4.3%
1900	36,017		21.3%
1910	33,672		−6.5%
1920	32,265		−4.2%
1930	30,882		−4.3%
1940	33,346		8.0%
1950	44,186		32.5%
1960	55,645		25.9%
1970	62,721		12.7%
1980	83,342		32.9%
1990	100,498		20.6%
2000	134,768		34.1%
2010	172,331		27.9%
2020	220,069		27.7%
2025 (est.)	249,935	▲	13.6%
US Decennial Census; 1790-1960 1900-1990; 1990-2000 2010-2014

=== Racial and ethnic composition ===
Montgomery County, Tennessee – Racial and ethnic composition Note: the US Census treats Hispanic/Latino as an ethnic category. This table excludes Latinos from the racial categories and assigns them to a separate category. Hispanics/Latinos may be of any race.
Race / ethnicity (NH = Non-Hispanic)	Pop 1980	Pop 1990	Pop 2000	Pop 2010	Pop 2020	% 1980	% 1990	% 2000	% 2010	% 2020
White alone (NH)	65,486	77,505	95,515	115,553	131,294	78.58%	77.12%	70.87%	67.05%	59.66%
Black or African American alone (NH)	14,530	17,580	25,496	32,003	43,349	17.43%	17.49%	18.92%	18.57%	19.70%
Native American or Alaska Native alone (NH)	196	370	624	782	757	0.24%	0.37%	0.46%	0.45%	0.34%
Asian alone (NH)	1,005	1,728	2,410	3,480	5,039	1.21%	1.72%	1.79%	2.02%	2.29%
Native Hawaiian or Pacific Islander alone (NH)	x	x	273	634	936	x	x	0.20%	0.37%	0.43%
Other race alone (NH)	197	87	342	245	1,207	0.24%	0.09%	0.25%	0.14%	0.55%
Mixed race or Multiracial (NH)	x	x	3,148	5,882	14,553	x	x	2.34%	3.41%	6.61%
Hispanic or Latino (any race)	1,928	3,228	6,960	13,752	22,934	2.31%	3.21%	5.16%	7.98%	10.42%
Total	83,342	100,498	134,768	172,331	220,069	100.00%	100.00%	100.00%	100.00%	100.00%

=== 2020 census ===
As of the 2020 United States census, there were 220,069 people, 76,974 households, and 53,563 families residing in the county.

The median age was 31.3 years, with 27.0% of residents under the age of 18 and 10.0% who were 65 years of age or older; for every 100 females there were 97.4 males, and for every 100 females age 18 and over there were 94.8 males age 18 and over.

The racial makeup of the county was 62.6% White, 20.3% Black or African American, 0.5% American Indian and Alaska Native, 2.4% Asian, 0.5% Native Hawaiian and Pacific Islander, 3.6% from some other race, and 10.2% from two or more races; Hispanic or Latino residents of any race comprised 10.4% of the population.

82.3% of residents lived in urban areas, while 17.7% lived in rural areas.

There were 79,841 households in the county, of which 38.8% had children under the age of 18 living in them; 51.0% were married-couple households, 17.4% were households with a male householder and no spouse or partner present, and 25.1% were households with a female householder and no spouse or partner present. About 22.6% of all households were made up of individuals and 6.5% had someone living alone who was 65 years of age or older.

There were 85,714 housing units, of which 6.9% were vacant; among occupied housing units, 60.2% were owner-occupied and 39.8% were renter-occupied. The homeowner vacancy rate was 2.1% and the rental vacancy rate was 7.3%.

=== 2000 census ===
As of the 2000 United States census, there were 134,768 people, 48,330 households, and 35,957 families in the county. The population density was 250 inhabitants per square mile (97/km^{2}). There were 52,167 housing units at an average density of 97 per square mile (37/km^{2}). The racial makeup of the county was 73.17% White, 19.18% Black or African American, 0.53% Native American, 1.82% Asian, 0.21% Pacific Islander, 2.18% from other races, and 2.91% from two or more races. 5.16% of the population were Hispanic or Latino of any race.

There were 48,330 households, out of which 40.70% had children under the age of 18 living with them, 58.70% were married couples living together, 12.20% had a female householder with no husband present, and 25.60% were non-families. 20.20% of all households were made up of individuals, and 5.50% had someone living alone who was 65 years of age or older. The average household size was 2.70, and the average family size was 3.11.

The county population contained 28.40% under the age of 18, 12.30% from 18 to 24, 34.30% from 25 to 44, 17.20% from 45 to 64, and 7.80% who were 65 years of age or older. The median age was 30 years. For every 100 females, there were 101.20 males. For every 100 females age 18 and over, there were 98.80 males.

The median income for a household in the county was $38,981, and the median income for a family was $43,023. Males had a median income of $30,696 versus $22,581 for females. The per capita income for the county was $17,265. About 7.90% of families and 10.00% of the population were below the poverty line, including 12.70% of those under age 18 and 10.70% of those age 65 or over.

== Government and politics ==
=== County government ===
The county mayor is the chief executive officer of Montgomery County, responsible for overseeing county administration and implementing policies adopted by the County Commission. Voters elect the county mayor at-large, along with several other countywide offices, including the sheriff. The current mayor is Republican Wes Golden.

==== Countywide elected officials ====
Office	Name
District 19 Attorney	Robert Nash (R)
County Mayor	Wes Golden (R)
Sheriff	Mike Oliver (R)
Trustee	Kimberly B. Wiggins (I)
Assessor of Property	Erinne Hester (R)
Highway Supervisor	Jeff Bryant (R)
County Clerk	Teresa Cottrell (R)
Register of Deeds	Julie Chadwick Runyon (R)
Circuit Court Clerk	Wendy Davis (R)

==== State elected offices ====
Montgomery County is represented in the Tennessee General Assembly by 4 Republicans and 1 Democrat in the House.

Office	Name
State Senator, District 22	Bill Powers (R)
State Senator, District 23	Kerry Roberts (R)

Office	Name
State Representative, District 67	Ronnie Glynn (D)
State Representative, District 68	Aron Maberry (R)
State Representative, District 75	Michael Lankford (R)

==== Legislative branch ====
Current Montgomery County Commission by partisanship
All 21 districts 11 seats needed for a majority
	Majority party	Minority party	Third party
Party	Democratic	Republican	Independent
Seats	11	7	3
- As of 2026; Democratic Republican Independent

The Board of County Commissioners, the legislative body of Montgomery County, consists of 21 members elected for four‑year terms from single-member districts with roughly equal populations. Republicans currently hold 8 seats, Democrats hold 8 seats, and 5 commissioners are Independent.

Each year at the first session on or after September 1, the commission elects a chair and a chair pro tempore. Since 2022, County Mayor Wes Golden has chaired the commission. If the county mayor is elected chair and accepts, they relinquish veto power over legislative resolutions. A chair who is a commissioner may vote as a regular member but may not cast a tie‑breaking vote.

If the county mayor does not serve as chair, they retain veto power over legislative resolutions (excluding administrative or appellate resolutions). A vetoed resolution must be returned to the commission with the mayor’s reasons within 10 days, and the commission may override the veto at the next regular meeting or within 20 days of receiving the veto.

When the chair is absent, the chair pro tempore presides. If both are absent, the county legislative body elects a temporary chair. The chair may designate another commissioner to act in their place on board, authority or commission, and the designee may exercise all powers and vote as if the chair were present.

==== Education governance ====
Current CMCSS by partisanship
All 7 districts 4 seats needed for a majority
	Majority party	Minority party
Party	Republican	Democratic
Seats	4	3
- As of 2026; Republican Democratic

Public education in Montgomery County is overseen by the Clarksville–Montgomery County School Board, which governs the Clarksville–Montgomery County School System (CMCSS). The board consists of 7 members elected from single-member districts, serving staggered four-year terms.

The board currently has a Republican majority, with 4 Republicans and 3 Democrats. The board appoints a director of schools to lead the district; the current director, Jean Luna-Vedder, was appointed on May 10, 2022, and began serving on July 1, 2022. She previously served as Chief of student readiness for the Tennessee State Department of Education.

=== Political history ===
Montgomery County has historically been a Democratic stronghold. Since the 2000 presidential election, however, the county started voting for the Republican Party, and is now a Republican stronghold.

The last time Montgomery County voted for a Democratic candidate in a statewide race was for Phil Bredesen in 2006, and the last time it voted for a Democratic candidate on a presidential level, was in 1996 when it voted for Democrat Bill Clinton.

Although Montgomery County is a Republican stronghold, the city of Clarksville has been competitive for both major political parties. In the 2024 presidential election, Clarksville voted for Donald Trump by a margin of 6.2%.

United States presidential election results for Montgomery County, Tennessee
Year	Republican		Democratic		Third party(ies)	
Year	No.	%	No.	%	No.	%
1880	2,039	41.74%	2,846	58.26%	0	0.00%
1884	1,922	43.07%	2,516	56.37%	25	0.56%
1888	2,164	44.08%	2,628	53.53%	117	2.38%
1892	1,927	35.46%	2,405	44.25%	1,103	20.29%
1896	2,934	48.17%	2,804	46.04%	353	5.80%
1900	1,815	41.42%	2,248	51.30%	319	7.28%
1904	843	31.41%	1,697	63.23%	144	5.37%
1908	1,903	38.67%	2,961	60.17%	57	1.16%
1912	514	21.13%	1,638	67.32%	281	11.55%
1916	991	32.83%	1,976	65.45%	52	1.72%
1920	1,780	40.60%	2,564	58.49%	40	0.91%
1924	941	32.00%	1,946	66.17%	54	1.84%
1928	1,743	48.30%	1,866	51.70%	0	0.00%
1932	799	22.53%	2,747	77.47%	0	0.00%
1936	838	20.05%	3,314	79.28%	28	0.67%
1940	819	20.53%	3,158	79.15%	13	0.33%
1944	702	19.05%	2,971	80.60%	13	0.35%
1948	646	14.34%	3,310	73.47%	549	12.19%
1952	2,573	30.78%	5,759	68.90%	27	0.32%
1956	2,778	25.41%	8,034	73.48%	122	1.12%
1960	2,550	24.83%	7,635	74.34%	85	0.83%
1964	2,814	21.66%	10,178	78.34%	0	0.00%
1968	3,248	22.52%	5,538	38.39%	5,638	39.09%
1972	7,839	56.40%	5,691	40.95%	369	2.65%
1976	5,923	32.11%	12,310	66.73%	215	1.17%
1980	8,503	41.08%	11,573	55.91%	622	3.01%
1984	13,228	56.61%	9,939	42.54%	198	0.85%
1988	12,599	57.65%	9,145	41.84%	112	0.51%
1992	13,011	41.51%	14,507	46.29%	3,823	12.20%
1996	15,133	45.01%	16,498	49.06%	1,994	5.93%
2000	19,644	50.31%	18,818	48.20%	582	1.49%
2004	28,627	58.42%	20,070	40.96%	301	0.61%
2008	30,175	53.28%	25,716	45.40%	748	1.32%
2012	30,245	54.28%	24,499	43.97%	976	1.75%
2016	32,341	56.13%	21,699	37.66%	3,580	6.21%
2020	42,187	54.96%	32,472	42.30%	2,099	2.73%
2024	47,795	58.46%	32,736	40.04%	1,224	1.50%

=== County mayoral elections ===
- 2026 Tennessee county mayoral elections

== Communities ==
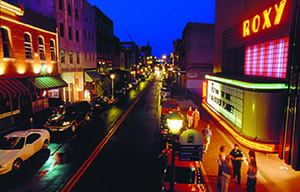
Clarksville

=== City ===
- Clarksville (county seat)

=== Unincorporated communities ===
- Cunningham
- Needmore
- New Providence
- Oakridge
- Palmyra
- Port Royal
- Salem
- Sango
- Shady Grove
- South Guthrie
- Southaven
- Southside
- St. Bethlehem
- Woodlawn

== Education ==
Clarksville-Montgomery County School System serves most of the county. Portions in Fort Campbell however are zoned to Department of Defense Education Activity (DoDEA) schools. Fort Campbell High School is the zoned high school for Fort Campbell.

== See also ==
- National Register of Historic Places listings in Montgomery County, Tennessee
- List of counties in Tennessee
