= Saint Bethlehem, Tennessee =

Coordinates: 36°34′19″N 87°18′00″W

Saint Bethlehem or St. Bethlehem, also called "St. B" by locals, was an unincorporated community in Montgomery County, Tennessee, located just northeast of downtown Clarksville. St. Bethlehem has been incorporated into Clarksville city limits and is no longer a separate community, although locals still refer to that portion of Clarksville as "St. B". The main U.S. post office for Clarksville is in the St. Bethlehem community on U.S. Route 79 (Wilma Rudolph Bvd.).

Originally named Cherry Station, the community was renamed by a former postmaster. It is home to most of Clarksville's restaurants, retail businesses, and industries, with U.S. Highway 79 (named Wilma Rudolph Boulevard in this area for the Olympic sprinter), running directly through the center. Beachaven Winery, Governor's Square Mall, the main branch of the Clarksville post office, and the county's main industrial park are also located in the area. The industrial park is currently being expanded to become one of the largest in Tennessee.

St. Bethlehem is one of the most visited areas in Montgomery County. The Governor's Square Mall (not to be confused with the Governor's Square Mall of Tallahassee, Florida), which is the center of shopping activity in St. Bethlehem, one of two K-Marts, Sam's Club (located further north), and one of three Wal-Marts in the county are located off this street.

During the Civil War, the Confederate States of America established Camp Boone at St. Bethlehem in 1861, along the Guthrie-Russellville Road (today SR 79) as a camp for the recruitment of Kentucky soldiers into the Confederate Army. A Tennessee state historical marker denotes the location.

When the Trane Company moved its factory into the area in the 1960s, the area exploded in growth, both residentially and commercially. During the 1980s, St. Bethlehem faced possible annexation to Clarksville, though the vote on the annexation barely passed. In recent years, the St. Bethlehem post office has become a branch of the Clarksville post office and St. Bethlehem has ceased to exist as an address. November 2004 had the opening of the Gateway-Vanderbilt Cancer Treatment Center just off U.S. 79, and in June 2008, the new Gateway Medical Center opened south of U.S. 79, next to the newly constructed Governor's Square Loop.

St. Bethlehem is a rapidly developing residential and commercial section of Clarksville, with annualized real estate price increases surpassing 8.5% and a steady increase of single-family homes costing more than $120,000.

St. Bethlehem can be easily accessed via Interstate 24 Exits 1, 4, and 8 in Tennessee, and by TN 374 from West and South Clarksville.

== Colleges ==
- Austin Peay State University
- Bethel College satellite campus
- Draughons Junior College satellite campus
- Miller-Motte College
- Nashville State Community College satellite campus
