= Port Royal State Park =

Historic area on the border of Montgomery and Robertson counties in Tennessee

Port Royal State Historic Park
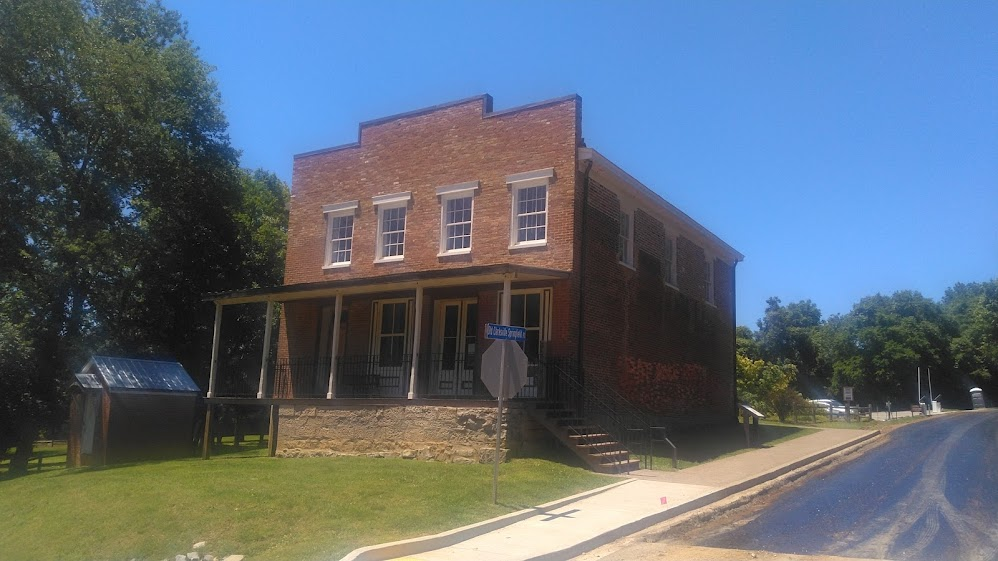
- 1859 Lodge & General Store
- Interactive map of Port Royal State Historic Park
- Type: Tennessee State Park
- Location: Montgomery and Robertson counties, Tennessee
- Nearest city: Adams, Tennessee
- Coordinates: 36.5557°N 87.1442°W
- Area: 26 acres (0.11 km^{2})
- Open: Year around
- Website: Port Royal State Park

Port Royal State Historic Park is a 26 acre (105,000 m²) historic area on the border of Montgomery County, Tennessee, and Robertson County, Tennessee, in the United States, named for the community of Port Royal, Tennessee. Port Royal existed as a town from 1797 to 1940, when the post office officially closed. The Red River runs through the center of the park. The park was established to preserve the former town and the elements of early Tennessee history, the history of the Red River Valley, as well as the heritage of the Trail of Tears and the Black Patch Tobacco Wars.

== History ==
Port Royal was the site of one of the earliest colonial communities in middle Tennessee, being first settled in the early 1780s. In the years 1838 and 1839, the town of Port Royal served as a resupply station for the Chickamauga Cherokee along the march to Oklahoma on the Trail of Tears and was the last of such in Tennessee on the northern route of the Trail. Port Royal State Historic Park preserves several sections of the original roadbed used by the Cherokee, and one section is an officially designated roadbed by the National Park Service. Being situated at an important junction of roads and rivers, Port Royal became one of the few stops on the "Great Western Road" stagecoach line between Nashville, Tennessee, and Hopkinsville, Kentucky. In 1977, the State of Tennessee received the deed to 26 acres (105,000 m²) of land at Port Royal, and designated it a State Historic Area in 1978.

== Features of Port Royal State Park ==
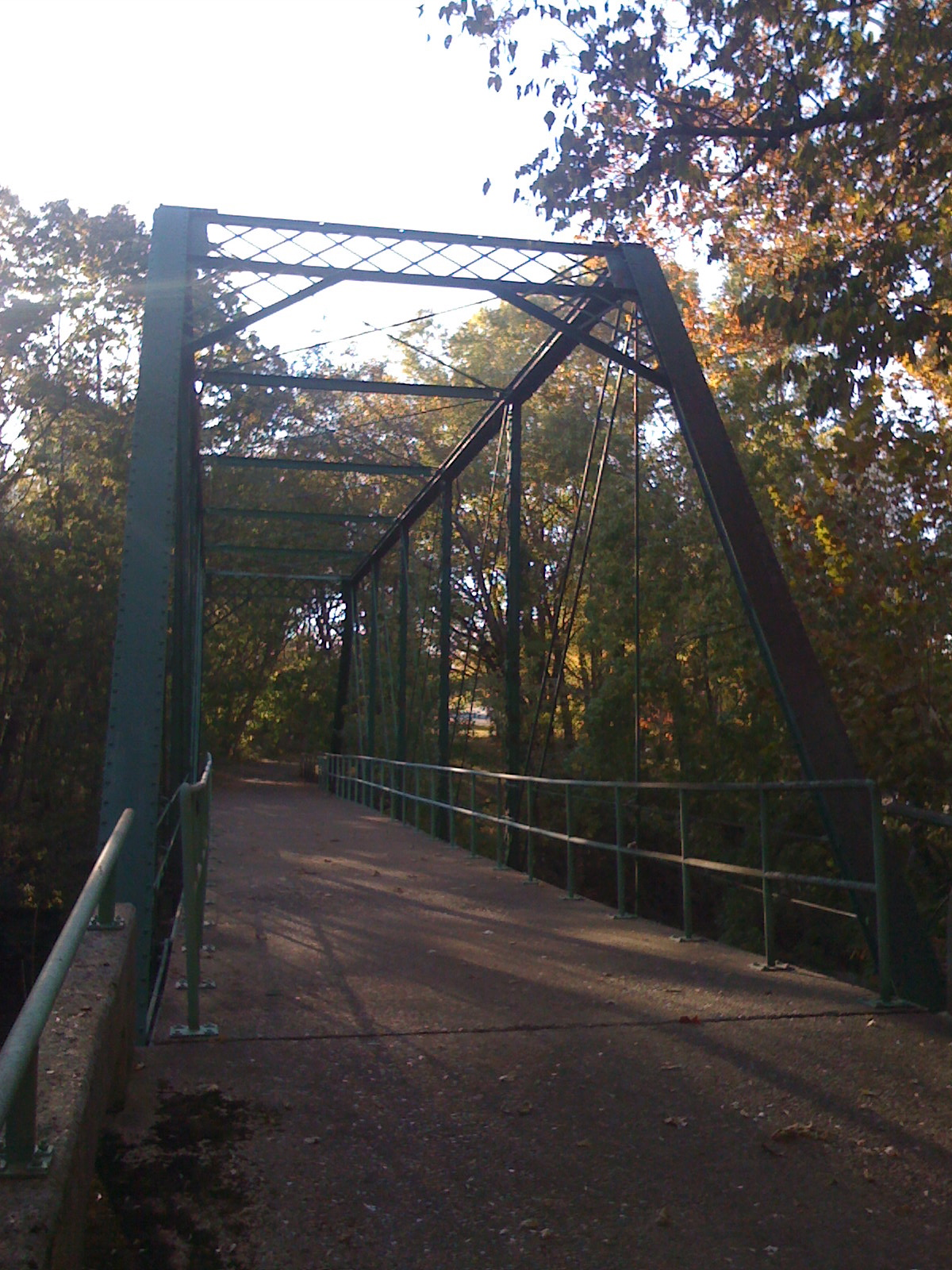
A Pratt truss bridge built in 1890 spans the Sulphur Fork Creek.

With Port Royal being such an important place of travel, transportation themes play heavily into the parks and communities history. Existing within the park are the remains of several old roadbeds, with one dating back to prehistoric times and one a certified Trail of Tears site.

Preserved within the park is an excellent example of an early Pratt truss design steel bridge being built in 1890. This bridge spans the Sulphur Fork Creek and is well preserved. The bridge is available to foot traffic only.

There are also the remains of a covered bridge that was damaged during a flood in 1998. This bridge dates from 1978 and was a 75% scale recreation of a bridge from 1904. Oral tradition suggests that the stone in the remaining piers originally came from the Port Royal Mills and dam which dates back to circa 1800.

The 1859 Masonic Lodge and General Store stands as the only structure of the former town and overlooks the archaeological townsite, where foundation stones from the buildings that used to line the main street of Port Royal can still be seen.
