= Port Royal, Tennessee =

Port Royal
- Unincorporated community
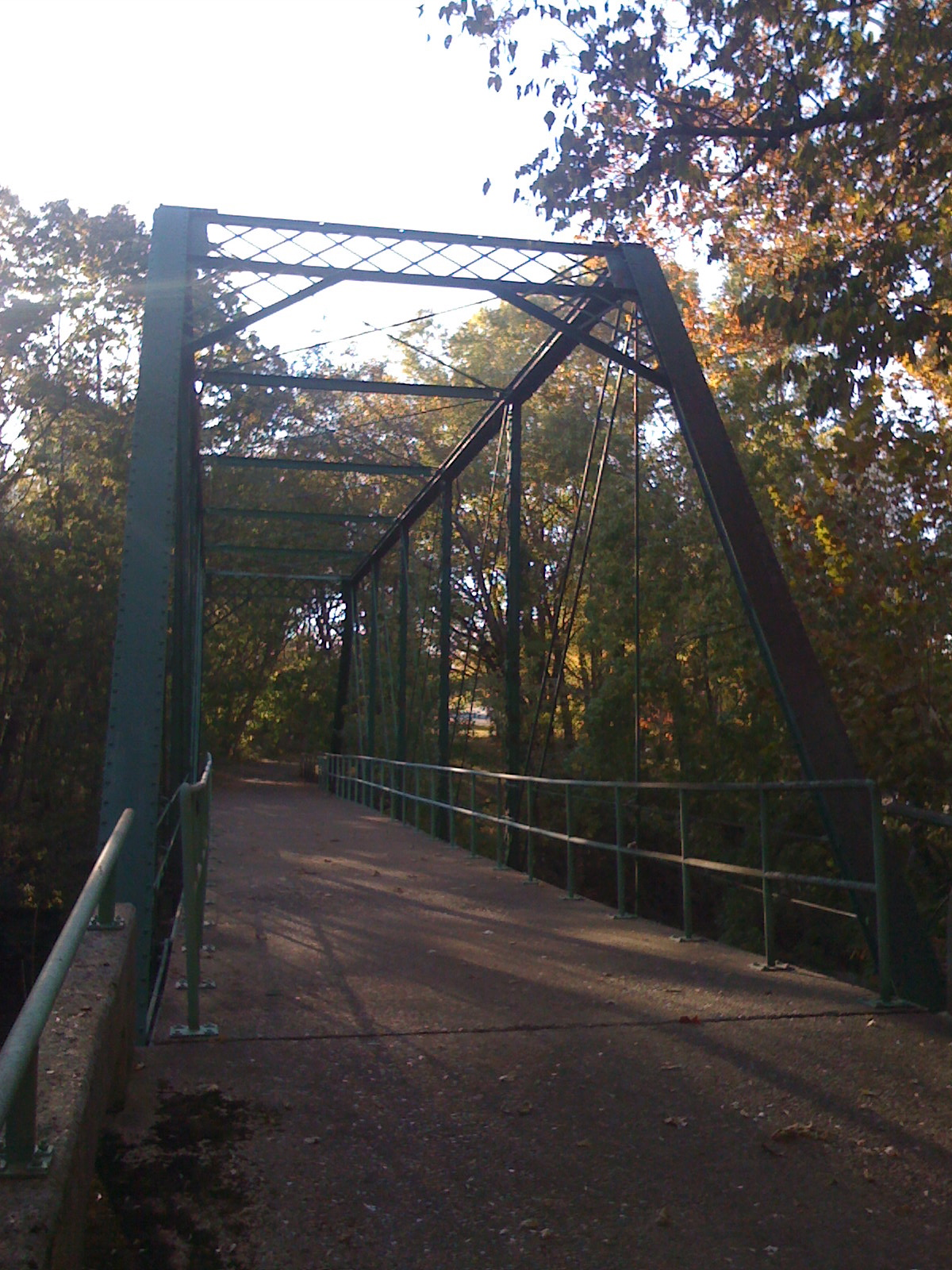
- Port Royal State Park bridge

- Location within Tennessee Location within the United States
- Coordinates: 36°33′13″N 87°08′31″W
- Country: United States
- State: Tennessee
- County: Montgomery, Robertson
- Time zone: UTC-6 (Central (CST))
  - Summer (DST): UTC-5 (CDT)

Port Royal is an unincorporated community on the border of Montgomery and Robertson counties, Tennessee. It is home to Port Royal State Park and is located at the confluence of the Red River and Sulphur Fork Creek.

== History ==
=== Early history ===
Port Royal was an early tobacco and trade center in what is now northern middle Tennessee. Euro-Americans settled the Red River valley, where Port Royal was located, beginning in the early 1780s. While there were numerous settlements in the Red River valley, Prince's Station was the heart of the community that later became Port Royal. In 1791 with the aid of a missionary, this settlement founded the Red River Baptist Church at the mouth of the Sulphur Fork Creek. This church is still active today in Adams, Tennessee. In 1788, Davidson County was divided to create Tennessee County, embracing the settlements along the Red River. When the State of Tennessee was founded in 1796, five delegates from Tennessee County were selected for representation at the Tennessee Constitutional Convention in Knoxville. Four of these five delegates were from the settlement at Port Royal.

=== Establishment of the town ===
The Second Tennessee General Assembly formally established the town of Port Royal on October 24, 1797. The legislation states that this was by petition of the local inhabitants. Soon after in 1799, the town was made a State tobacco inspection point and public warehouse. Initially, Port Royal was only a seasonal hub of tobacco commerce. The first post office here was established in 1802. Due to Port Royal's location on a major route west from Nashville, businesses like taverns, inns, and stables were built to accommodate the flow of travellers to the west. However, Port Royals growth was minimal. In 1818, a traveler referred to Port Royal as a "village rather on the decline". From around 1815 until his death, Dr. George Hopson kept his practice at Port Royal. Dr. Hopson is better known for his role in the story of the Bell Witch.

=== Trail of Tears ===
In the fall of 1838 over ten thousand Cherokees slept in the State of Tennessee for the last time at Port Royal. All detachments of Cherokees that were removed via the Northern Route of the Trail of Tears. A letter from detachment leader Elijah Hicks to Principal Chief John Ross, tells of the stay at Port Royal. This letter is one of few remaining documents describing the Cherokees experience at Port Royal.

=== New Era for the town ===
New investment in the town in 1839 sparked a flurry of redevelopment and growth that lasted for nearly three decades. As the town moved away from a seasonal, rural community, it shifted toward a developed townscape featuring all the usual shops, stores, and warehouses common to small towns. In 1842, the Tennessee Silk Manufacturing Company and Agricultural School was opened. At his 1843 inauguration Governor James C. Jones wore a silk suit manufactured in Port Royal. Other endeavors included the Port Royal Manufacturing Company (1844), the Port Royal Turnpike Company (1847), the Port Royal Female Academy (1853), and Hampton's Lodge, Free & Accepted Mason's, Lodge No. 137 (1859). By 1845, occasional small steamboats visited Port Royal and by 1859, railroads in the region disrupted Port Royal's traditional role as a tobacco trade town.

=== The African American community at Port Royal ===
After 1865, newly emancipated African Americans established Black-owned businesses, churches, and fraternal organizations. The book Pioneer Colored Christians, by Harriett Parks Miller, records the stories of Port Royal's Black community.

=== Black Patch Tobacco War ===
While some businesses continued to operate, Port Royal noticeably declined in the 1890s. However, in 1904, the creation of the Planter's Protective Association at Port Royal eventually led to the Black Patch Tobacco War. In 1908, masked vigilates in support of the Association, known as Night Riders, raided Port Royal. Port Royal is the only recorded town in Tennessee attacked by Night Riders in Tennessee.

=== End of the Town, Beginning of a Historic Site ===
With the closure of the Masonic Lodge in 1921, Port Royal had become a small crossroads community. In 1941, the 139 year old post office closed. In 1978, the Tennessee Department of Conservation, Division of State Parks acquire a significant portion of Port Royal. The historic town is now a preserved and protected historic site called Port Royal State Park. It is also an officially certified site on the Trail of Tears National Historic Trail. The preserved section of the Trail of Tears and the 1890 Iron Pratt truss bridge are both listed in the National Register of Historic Places.

== Notable residents ==
The 1940s all-female, integrated big band International Sweethearts of Rhythm was led by Anna Mae Winburn, who was born in Port Royal in 1913.

== See also ==
- History of Tennessee
