= Tennessee State Route 25 =

State highway in Tennessee, United States

State Route 25
- SR 25; primary in red, secondary in blue

Route information
- Maintained by TDOT
- Length: 67.6 mi (108.8 km)
- Existed: October 1, 1923–present

Major junctions
- West end: SR 161 in Barren Plains
- US 431 north of Springfield; I-65 in Cross Plains; US 31W in Cross Plains; SR 109 in Gallatin; SR 386 / SR 174 in Gallatin; US 31E in Gallatin; US 231 / SR 10 east of Castalian Springs
- East end: US 70N / SR 53 in South Carthage

Location
- Country: United States
- State: Tennessee
- Counties: Robertson, Sumner, Trousdale, Smith

Highway system
- Tennessee State Routes; Interstate; US; State
← US 25W	→ SR 26

State Route 25 (SR 25) is a 67.6-mile-long (108.8 km) east–west state highway in northern Middle Tennessee.

== Route description ==
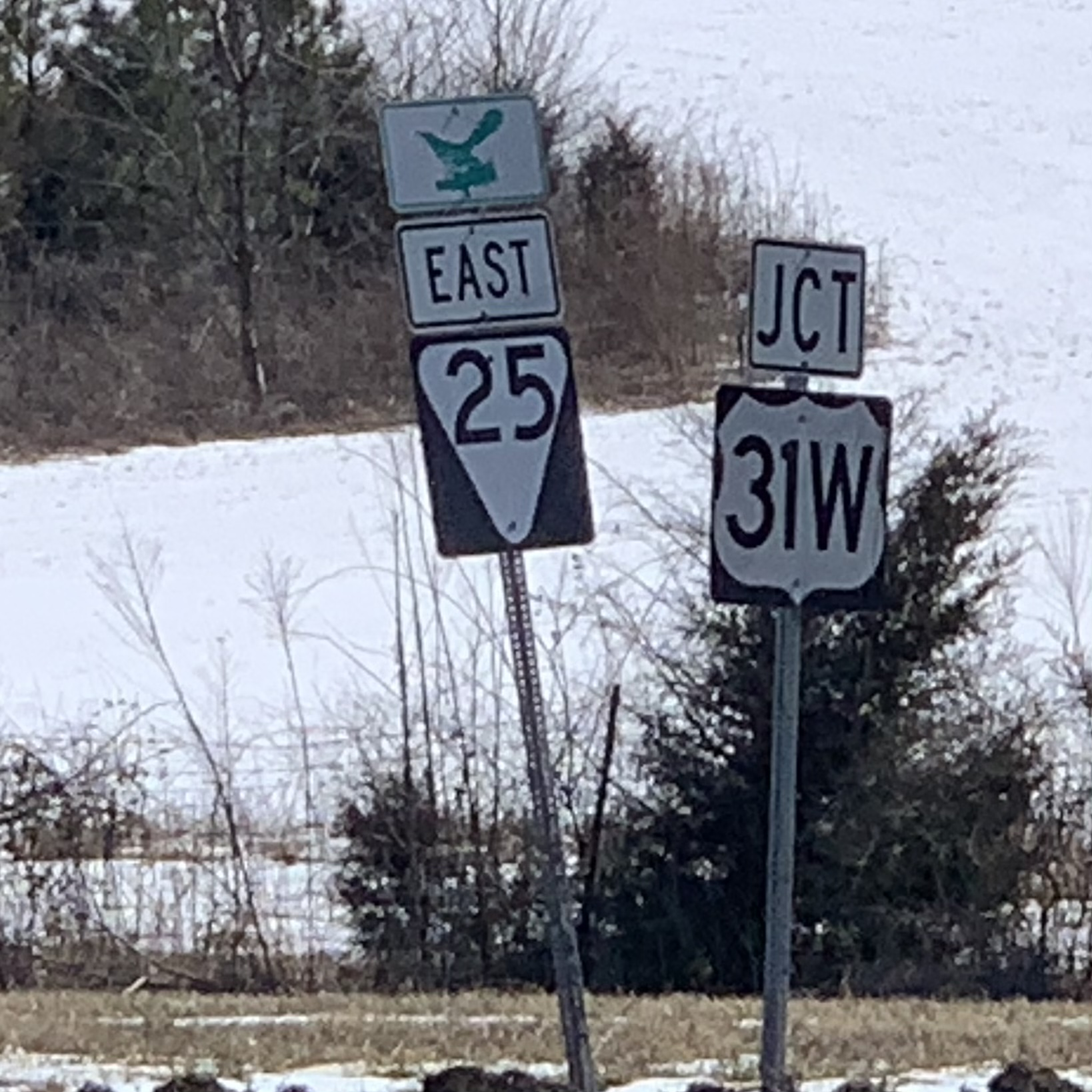
Reassurance shield incorrectly showing SR 25 as a secondary highway in Cross Plains (Image taken February 2021)

SR 25 begins as a secondary highway in Robertson County in Barren Plains at an intersection with SR 161, and goes east to an intersection with US 431/SR 65 just north of Springfield. It continues east through rural unincorporated Robertson County, near Cross Plains, to intersect and have a short concurrency with SR 49, before separating and continuing east, becoming a primary highway. It then goes through the middle of Cross Plains and continues east to intersect I-65. About 1/2 mile (0.80 km) later, it intersects US 31W/SR 41 and enters Sumner County.

It then comes to an intersection with SR 76 just south of New Deal. It continues through Cottontown to Gallatin to intersect with SR 109. It continues into downtown Gallatin to intersect and run concurrently with SR 174/SR 386. A short distance later, it intersects US 31E/SR 6, where SR 386 ends and SR 174 separates and continues north along US 31E/SR 6 into downtown, while SR 25 continues east. It continues through Castalian Springs and enters Trousdale County.

A short distance from the county line, it intersects US 231 and SR 10, with SR 10 running concurrently with SR 25 to Hartsville. Continuing east, it enters Hartsville and intersects SR 141, runs concurrent for a short distance, then separates and turns south, while SR 25/SR 10 continue east. Just outside of Hartsville, SR 10 separates and turns north, while SR 25 continues its eastward trek, and crosses into Smith County shortly afterwards. Just before the county line, SR 25 passes just north of the abandoned Hartsville Nuclear Plant.

After crossing into Smith County, it passes through Dixon Springs. It then continues east to Riddleton, and then to Carthage, where it intersects SR 80. Continuing into Carthage, it intersects with SR 263, providing access to downtown. It then curves to the south and crosses the Cumberland River and enters South Carthage. It then ends at US 70N/SR 24/SR 53 in South Carthage.

== Future ==
Currently, a project to modify the intersection with SR 49 east of Springfield is underway. The project is projected to be completed by the end of 2021. Update: Intersection modification was completed in late 2022.

== Major intersections ==
County	Location	mi	km	Destinations	Notes
Robertson	Barren Plains	0.00	0.00	SR 161 – Allensville, KY, Springfield	Western terminus; SR 25 begins as a secondary highway
Robertson		3.9	6.3	US 431 (Tom Austin Highway/SR 65) – Adairville, KY, Springfield	
Robertson		6.8	10.9	SR 49 west – Springfield	Western end of SR 49 concurrency
Robertson		7.6	12.2	SR 49 east – Orlinda	Eastern end of SR 49 concurrency; SR 25 turns primary
Robertson	Cross Plains	16.7– 16.9	26.9– 27.2	I-65 – Nashville, Louisville	I-65 exit 112
Robertson	Cross Plains	17.2	27.7	US 31W (SR 41) – White House, Franklin, KY	
Sumner		20.6	33.2	SR 76 (Portland-White House Road) – White House, New Deal, Portland	
Sumner	Gallatin	30.0	48.3	SR 109 – Portland, Lebanon	
Sumner	Gallatin	31.3	50.4	SR 174 west (Long Hollow Pike/SR 386 south) – Hendersonville	Western end of SR 174/SR 386 concurrency
Sumner	Gallatin	31.7	51.0	US 31E / SR 174 east (W Main Street/W Broadway/SR 6) – Hendersonville, Westmoreland	Northern terminus of SR 386; eastern end of SR 174 concurrency
Trousdale		42.7	68.7	US 231 (Hunters Point Pike/SR 10 south/SR 376 north) – Lebanon, Westmoreland	Southern terminus of SR 376; western end of SR 10 concurrency
Trousdale	Hartsville	48.2	77.6	SR 141 north – Westmoreland	Western end of SR 141 concurrency
Trousdale	Hartsville	48.5	78.1	SR 141 south (Broadway) – Lebanon	Eastern end of SR 141 concurrency
Trousdale		51.3	82.6	SR 10 north – Lafayette	Eastern end of SR 10 concurrency
Smith		61.5	99.0	SR 80 north (Pleasant Shade Highway) – Pleasant Shade, Red Boiling Springs	Southern terminus of SR 80
Smith	Carthage	64.8	104.3	SR 263 north (Turkey Creek Highway) – Defeated	Southern terminus of SR 263
Smith	South Carthage	67.6	108.8	US 70N / SR 53 (Lebanon Highway/Gordonsville Highway/Cookeville Highway/SR 24) – Lebanon, Gordonsville, Cookeville	Interchange; eastern terminus; SR 25 ends as a primary highway
1.000 mi = 1.609 km; 1.000 km = 0.621 mi: Concurrency terminus
