= Tennessee State Route 174 =

Highway in Tennessee

State Route 174
- SR 174 highlighted in red

Route information
- Maintained by TDOT
- Length: 40.9 mi (65.8 km)

Major junctions
- West end: US 31W / US 41 – Goodlettsville
- I-65 in Goodlettsville; SR 386 near Gallatin; SR 109 near Gallatin; SR 25 / US 31E – Gallatin; SR 52 – Oak Grove
- East end: KY 3521 at the Kentucky state line near Adolphus, KY

Location
- Country: United States
- State: Tennessee
- Counties: Davidson, Sumner

Highway system
- Tennessee State Routes; Interstate; US; State
← SR 173	→ SR 175

State Route 174 (SR 174) is a secondary east–west state highway in northern Middle Tennessee. It traverses northern Davidson and much of Sumner counties. While it is signed as an east–west highway, it averages more of a northeast-to-southwest alignment throughout its length.

== Route description ==
=== Goodlettsville to Gallatin ===
SR 174 begins in Davidson County in Goodlettsville at an intersection with US 41/US 31W/SR 41. From that point to the Gallatin city limit, the road bears the name Long Hollow Pike. It goes east as a four-lane undivided highway to have an interchange with I-65 (Exit 97) before entering Sumner County. SR 174 then narrows to a two-lane highway as it leaves Goodlettsville and enters rural areas. The highway then passes through Shackle Island, where it has an intersection with SR 258. The highway continues east to enter Gallatin, where comes to an intersection and becomes concurrent with SR 386. SR 174/SR 386 then passes through several neighborhoods as a four-lane undivided highway to an interchange with SR 109. SR 386 becomes unsigned at this interchange and they continue east through neighborhoods as a narrow two-lane road. They then become concurrent with SR 25 and turn southeast as Red River Road before entering downtown and coming to an intersection with US 31E/SR 6, where SR 386 ends and SR 174 splits off of SR 25 to follow US 31E/SR 6 north. They go northeast as Gallatin Pike as a four-lane undivided highway through a business district before SR 174 splits off of US 31E/SR 6 as North Water Avenue. SR 174 turns to a northerly path and passes through more neighborhoods as a two-lane highway before leaving Gallatin and continuing north as Dobbins Pike through rural areas.

=== Gallatin to the Kentucky state line ===
North of Gallatin, SR 174 traverses northern part of the Highland Rim, where it passes through Graball, before entering farmland and passing through Oak Grove. Here it has an intersection with SR 52. The highway then winds its way northeast as Fairfield Road to pass through Fairfield before becoming Kentucky Route 3521 (KY 3521) at the Kentucky state line.

== History ==
The road that is now SR 174 originally had its western terminus east of I-65. On June 3, 1980, an extension to US 31W/41 opened, which included a new interchange with I-65. Construction of this interchange required digging under I-65 and building new bridges in a place where bridges did not previously exist. SR 174 was first incorporated into the state highway system around 1982 or 1983, likely before the 1983 state highway takeover and renumbering.

As part of the extension of SR 386 to Gallatin between November 2003 and June 2007, SR 174 was realigned to intersect with the eastern terminus of the signed portion of that route. From here, SR 386 was placed onto an unsigned concurrency with SR 174 to US 31E/SR 25 in downtown Gallatin, and the section extending to east of SR 109 was expanded into a four-lane undivided highway. The intersection with SR 386 is planned to be converted into a grade-separated interchange in the future.

On July 20, 2026, local officials announced the section of SR 174 in Goodlettsville would be designated "Charlie Kirk Memorial Highway" after the conservative political activist who was assassinated in 2025. The designation resulted from legislation passed by the Tennessee General Assembly in May 2026 and was previously applied to nearby SR 386 (Vietnam Veterans Boulevard), but was moved after several local Vietnam veterans objected.

== Major intersections ==
County	Location	mi	km	Destinations	Notes
Davidson	Goodlettsville	0.0	0.0	US 31W / US 41 (Dickerson Pike/SR 11)	Western terminus
Davidson	Goodlettsville			I-65 – Nashville, Louisville	I-65 Exit 97
Sumner	Shackle Island			SR 258 (New Hope Road/New Shackle Island Road) – White House, Hendersonville	
Sumner	Gallatin			SR 386 west (Vietnam Veterans Boulevard) – Nashville, Hendersonville	Western end of SR 386 concurrency
Sumner	Gallatin			SR 109 – Portland, Lebanon	Diamond interchange; SR 386 becomes unsigned
Sumner	Gallatin			SR 25 west (Red River Road) – Cross Plains	Western end of SR 25 concurrency
Sumner	Gallatin			North Blythe Avenue (Old SR 109)	
Sumner	Gallatin			US 31E south / SR 25 east (West Main Street/SR 6) – Hendersonville, Hartsville	Eastern end of SR 25 concurrency; western end of US 31E/SR 6 concurrency; eastern terminus of unsigned SR 386
Sumner	Gallatin			South Water Street (Old SR 109)	
Sumner	Gallatin			US 31E north (East Broadway/SR 6) – Westmoreland	Eastern end of US 31E/SR 6 concurrency; SR 174 changes cardinal directions from east-west to north south
Sumner	Oak Grove			SR 52 (Austin Peay Highway) – Portland, Westmoreland	
Sumner				Old Highway 31E south - Westmoreland	
Sumner		40.9	65.8	KY 3521 north – Adolphus	Northern terminus at the Kentucky state line; road continues into Allen County, Kentucky as KY 3521
1.000 mi = 1.609 km; 1.000 km = 0.621 mi: Concurrency terminus
