= U.S. Route 31W =

U.S. Highway in Kentucky and Tennessee

U.S. Route 31W
- US 31W highlighted in red

Route information
- Length: 179.2 mi (288.4 km)

Major junctions
- South end: US 31 / US 31E / US 41 / US 431 in Nashville, TN
- I-65 in Nashville, TN; US 41 in Goodlettsville, TN; I-65 in Goodlettsville, TN; I-165 in Bowling Green, KY; US 231 Bowling Green, KY; US 68 / KY 80 in Bowling Green, KY; I-65 in Munfordville, KY
- North end: US 31 / US 31E / US 60 in Louisville, KY

Location
- Country: United States
- States: Tennessee, Kentucky
- Counties: TN: Davidson, Sumner, Robertson; KY: Simpson, Warren, Edmonson, Barren, Hart, LaRue, Hardin, Meade, Jefferson

Highway system
- United States Numbered Highway System; List; Special; Divided
- Kentucky State Highway System; Interstate; US; State; Parkways
- Tennessee State Routes; Interstate; US; State
← US 31E	KY	→ KY 32
← US 31E	TN	→ US 31A
← US 41A	TN SR 41	→ US 43

U.S. Route 31W (US 31W) is the westernmost of two parallel routes for U.S. Route 31 from Nashville, Tennessee to Louisville, Kentucky.

During the December 2021 tornado outbreak, an EF3 tornado devastated stretches of US 31W in Bowling Green, Kentucky.

== Route description ==
=== Tennessee ===
US 31W begins in Nashville, at an interchange with Ellington Parkway, US 31 and US 31E. The route continues west as Spring Street, concurrent with US 41/US 431/SR 11. The four highways continue north onto Dickerson Pike, closely paralleling Interstate 24 (I-24) through Nashville. US 431 turns onto Trinity Lane, while US 31W, US 41, and SR 11 continue north, away from I-24. The roadway has interchanges with I-65 and SR 155 (Briley Parkway) before an intersection with SR 45 in Bellshire Terrace. The highway passes through Goodlettsville, where US 31W splits from US 41/SR 11, and crosses I-65; it also passes through the cities of Millersville, White House, and the western edge of Portland. Before it enters Kentucky, it junctions the recently rerouted SR 109. From Millersville to the Kentucky state line, US 31W/SR 41 also marks the boundary between Robertson and Sumner Counties.

=== Kentucky ===
The highway enters the state of Kentucky and crosses I-65 for a third time, where it passes through Franklin and intersects KY 100. From here, the highway is known as Bowling Green Road, which becomes Nashville Road once it enters Warren County, and passes through fields, as well as giving access to the towns of Woodburn and Rich Pond. Entering the city of Bowling Green, the route intersects Interstate 165 (I-165, formerly the William H. Natcher Parkway) as well as US 231 as the route bypasses downtown Bowling Green. On the eastern side of town, Louisville Road carries US 31W, US 68, and KY 80 east and then northeast. At an intersection east of Bristow, US 68 and KY 80 split off to the east before bypassing Oakland. It has a brief concurrency with KY 101 before entering southeastern Edmonson County. Upon entry into Barren County, US 31W passes within 0.5 miles (0.80 km) of an entrance to Mammoth Cave National Park near Park City, after crossing I-65 again, this time without direct access to the freeway. The highway travels through Cave City as Duke Highway while crossing two major state routes, KY 90 in the southern outskirts, and then KY 70 in downtown.

Once it enters Hart County going north, US 31W is locally known as Dixie Highway for the remainder of its course. In the city of Horse Cave, US 31W intersects KY 218; and then continues on to Munfordville before crossing I-65 for a fifth time at the Interstate's exit 65 interchange, and paralleling it closely to the west and later, the east. Between Upton and Sonora, it crosses over I-65 for a sixth time. In Elizabethtown, US 31W begins a brief concurrency with KY 61 at the eastern terminus of the Wendell H. Ford Western Kentucky Parkway before crossing I-65 for a seventh and final time. The route continues through the heart of Elizabethtown, intersecting US 62, before it goes on to enter Radcliff. It also passes through Fort Knox near Radcliff, within sight of the United States Bullion Depository. US 31W overlaps with US 60 from Muldraugh to Louisville, paralleling the Ohio River briefly before an interchange with I-264 (Watterson Expressway) in Louisville's southwestern suburbs. US 31W continues as a one-way pair consisting of 22nd and Dr. W. J. Hodges streets, and later Main and Market streets in downtown Louisville. At 2nd Street, US 31W ends at US 31E, and the two routes continue north as US 31 before crossing the Ohio River into Jeffersonville, in Clark County, Indiana on the George Rogers Clark Memorial Bridge.

== History ==
Most of US 31W's current route was part of the old Dixie Highway from the National Auto Trail program, the predecessor to the United States Numbered Highways system. Many of the cities through which US 31W traverses still give it a local street name of "Dixie Highway" or "Dixie Avenue." Some portions date back further, to the Louisville and Nashville Turnpike, which began construction in the 1830s. Until 1926, the route in Tennessee from US 41E to the Kentucky state line was signed as State Route 79 (SR 79); it was resigned as SR 41 until the US 31W designation was established in 1931, but SR 41 remained as an unsigned, hidden route. The route from the state line northward to US 68 in Bowling Green was signed as Kentucky Route 73 from 1929 until 1931, when the US 31W designation was established.

=== US 31W in Indiana ===
US 31W once terminated in Sellersburg, Indiana. It went into New Albany, Indiana, crossing the Kentucky & Indiana Terminal Bridge into Louisville, concurrent with U.S. Route 150. When the K&I Terminal Bridge was closed to traffic in 1979, US 31W and US 150 were rerouted onto the Sherman Minton Bridge, being concurrent with Interstate 64 until Exit 121. In 1980, AASHTO truncated both termini of US 31E and US 31W to Louisville. In Indiana, US 31W was replaced by SR 311.

== 31W Treasure Hunt ==
The 31W Treasure Hunt is an outdoor second-hand sale held annually for three days beginning the second Thursday in September. It takes place along the alignment of U.S. Route 31W in its entirety from Nashville to Louisville.

== Major intersections ==
State	County	Location	mi	km	Destinations	Notes
Tennessee	Davidson	Nashville	0.00	0.00	US 31 south / US 41 south / US 431 south (James Robertson Parkway/SR 6/SR 11) / US 31E north (Ellington Parkway/SR 6) to South 5th Street/Main Street / I-24	Interchange; US 31 splits into US 31W and US 31E; south end of US 41/US 431/SR 11 overlap
Tennessee	Davidson	Nashville	0.5	0.80	To I-24 / I-65 / Spring Street	
Tennessee	Davidson	Nashville	2.6	4.2	US 431 north (West Trinity Lane/SR 65) to I-24 / I-65	North end of US 431 overlap; southern terminus of unsigned SR 65
Tennessee	Davidson	Nashville	4.8– 5.0	7.7– 8.0	I-65 – Nashville, Louisville	Southbound off-ramp from SR 155 off-ramp; I-65 exit 90A
Tennessee	Davidson	Nashville	5.1– 5.2	8.2– 8.4	SR 155 (Briley Parkway) – Nashville, Knoxville	No eastbound on-ramp (must use northbound I-65 on-ramp); SR 155 exit 16B
Tennessee	Davidson	Nashville	7.1	11.4	SR 45 (Old Hickory Boulevard) – Whites Creek, Old Hickory, Madison	
Tennessee	Davidson	Goodlettsville	11.2	18.0	Rivergate Parkway east to I-65 – Madison	Western terminus of Rivergate Parkway; provides access to Rivergate Mall
Tennessee	Davidson	Goodlettsville	11.7	18.8	SR 174 east (Long Hollow Pike)	Western terminus of SR 174
Tennessee	Sumner	Goodlettsville	13.1	21.1	US 41 north (Dickerson Pike/SR 11) – Springfield, Greenbrier, Ridgetop; SR 41 begins	Interchange; north end of US 41/SR 11 overlap; southern terminus of unsigned SR 41; south end of SR 41 overlap; former US 43 north
Tennessee	Sumner	Goodlettsville	13.4– 13.6	21.6– 21.9	I-65 – Louisville, Nashville	I-65 exit 98
Tennessee	Sumner	Millersville	18.3	29.5	SR 257 west (Bethel Road) to I-65 – Ridgetop	Eastern terminus of SR 257
Tennessee	Sumner–Robertson county line	White House	22.6	36.4	SR 258 (Raymond Hirsch Parkway) to I-65 – Hendersonville	
Tennessee	Sumner–Robertson county line	White House	23.3	37.5	SR 76 west to I-65 – Springfield	South end of SR 76 overlap
Tennessee	Sumner–Robertson county line	White House	23.5	37.8	SR 76 east (Portland Road) – New Deal, Portland	North end of SR 76 overlap
Tennessee	Sumner–Robertson county line	Cross Plains	27.5	44.3	SR 25 (Main Street) to I-65 – Cross Plains, Springfield, Gallatin	
Tennessee	Sumner–Robertson county line	Portland–Orlinda line	32.6	52.5	SR 52 to I-65 – Orlinda, Portland	
Tennessee	Sumner–Robertson county line	Portland	35.5	57.1	SR 109 (N Broadway) to I-65 – Portland, Gallatin	
Tennessee	Sumner–Robertson county line	Portland	36.0	57.9	SR 259 east – Mitchellville	Western terminus of SR 259
Tennessee–Kentucky line			36.08– 0.000	58.07– 0.000	SR 41 ends	
Kentucky	Simpson				I-65 – Louisville, Nashville	I-65 exit 2
Kentucky	Simpson				KY 1008 / KY 100 Truck to I-65	
Kentucky	Simpson				KY 100 east to I-65	South end of KY 100 overlap
Kentucky	Simpson	Franklin			KY 383 south (Madison Street)	
Kentucky	Simpson	Franklin			KY 73 east / KY 100 west (Cedar Street)	North end of KY 100 overlap; south end of KY 73 overlap
Kentucky	Simpson	Franklin			KY 1171 (North Street)	
Kentucky	Simpson	Franklin			KY 73 west (Morgantown Road)	North end of KY 73 overlap
Kentucky	Simpson	Franklin			KY 2592 (Patton Road)	
Kentucky	Simpson	Franklin			KY 1008 south to I-65 – truck route to KY 100	
Kentucky	Simpson				KY 1434	
Kentucky	Simpson				KY 621 (Stevenson Road)	
Kentucky	Warren	Woodburn			KY 240	
Kentucky	Warren				KY 242 – Rockfield, Rich Pond	
Kentucky	Warren	Bowling Green			I-165 to I-65 – Owensboro, Scottsville	Former Natcher Parkway; I-165 exit 3
Kentucky	Warren	Bowling Green			US 231 (Campbell Lane)	
Kentucky	Warren	Bowling Green			US 231 Bus. north (University Drive) to US 68 / KY 80	South end of US 231 Bus. overlap; roundabout
Kentucky	Warren	Bowling Green			US 231 Bus. south (Broadway Avenue) to I-65	North end of US 231 Bus. overlap
Kentucky	Warren	Bowling Green			KY 234 (Fairview Avenue) to I-65	
Kentucky	Warren	Bowling Green			KY 3225 north (Old Louisville Road)	
Kentucky	Warren	Bowling Green			US 68 west / KY 80 west (Kentucky Street) to I-65 south	South end of US 68/KY 80 overlap
Kentucky	Warren	Bowling Green			KY 3225 south (Old Louisville Road)	Eastern terminus of KY 3225
Kentucky	Warren	Bowling Green			KY 1402 east (Porter Pike) to Plum Springs Loop / KY 957	Western terminus of KY 1402
Kentucky	Warren	Bowling Green			To I-65 (via KY 446 east) – Louisville, Nashville, Corvette Museum	Interchange; western terminus of KY 446
Kentucky	Warren	Bowling Green			KY 957 north	Southern terminus of KY 957
Kentucky	Warren				KY 526 west to KY 1320	Eastern terminus of KY 526
Kentucky	Warren				US 68 east / KY 80 east	North end of US 68/KY 80 concurrency
Kentucky	Warren				KY 3145 south to I-65	Northern terminus of KY 3145; intersection opened July 2017.
Kentucky	Warren				KY 743 north	Southern terminus of KY 743
Kentucky	Warren	Tuckertown			KY 2326 north (Otter Gap Road)	Southern terminus of KY 2326
Kentucky	Warren				KY 101 north – Brownsville	South end of KY 101 concurrency
Kentucky	Warren				KY 101 south – Smiths Grove	North end of KY 101 concurrency
Kentucky	Edmonson				KY 422 north	Southern terminus of KY 422
Kentucky	Edmonson				KY 259	
Kentucky	Barren	Park City			KY 255 south	South end of KY 255 concurrency
Kentucky	Barren	Park City			Mammoth Cave Parkway / KY 255 north to I-65 – Mammoth Cave, Brownsville	Southern terminus of Mammoth Cave Parkway; northern end of KY 255 concurrency
Kentucky	Barren				KY 2189 south (Park City-Glasgow Road)	Northern terminus of KY 2189
Kentucky	Barren				KY 2143 south (Old Happy Valley Road)	Former KY 90; northern terminus of KY 2143
Kentucky	Barren	Cave City			KY 90 (Happy Valley Road) to I-65 / KY 70 – Mammoth Cave, Glasgow	
Kentucky	Barren	Cave City			KY 70 (Broadway Street) – Business District, Hiseville	
Kentucky	Barren	Cave City			KY 335 north (Old Dixie Highway)	Southern terminus of KY 335
Kentucky	Hart	Horse Cave			KY 218 (Main Street) to I-65 / US 31E	
Kentucky	Hart				KY 1846 south (Short Cut Road)	Northern terminus of KY 1846
Kentucky	Hart	Rowletts			KY 335 south (L&N Turnpike Road)	Northern terminus of KY 335
Kentucky	Hart	Woodsonville			KY 571 south (Lonoke Road)	Northern terminus of KY 571
Kentucky	Hart	Woodsonville			KY 88 east – Hardyville	South end of KY 88 concurrency
Kentucky	Hart	Munfordville			KY 357 north (Union Street) – Hodgenville	Southern terminus of KY 357
Kentucky	Hart	Munfordville			KY 88 west (Center Street) – Clarkson, Nolin Lake	North end of KY 88 concurrency
Kentucky	Hart	Munfordville			I-65 – Nashville, Louisville	I-65 exit 65
Kentucky	Hart	Munfordville			KY 1140 west	Southern/eastern terminus of KY 1140
Kentucky	Hart				KY 2756 east	Western terminus of KY 2756
Kentucky	Hart	Bonnieville			KY 728 east to I-65	South end of KY 728 concurrency
Kentucky	Hart	Bonnieville			KY 728 west	North end of KY 728 concurrency
Kentucky	LaRue	Upton			KY 224 east to I-65 – Hodgenville	South end of KY 224 concurrency
Kentucky	LaRue–Hardin county line	Upton			KY 224 west (Grayson Street) – Clarkson, Nolin River, Nolin Lake	North end of KY 224 concurrency
Kentucky	LaRue–Hardin county line				KY 2767 north (Murrieltown Road)	Southern terminus of KY 2767
Kentucky	LaRue–Hardin county line	Sonora			KY 84 to I-65 – Sonora, Hodgenville	
Kentucky	LaRue–Hardin county line				KY 1517 south	Northern terminus of KY 1517
Kentucky	Hardin				KY 1407 north	Southern terminus of KY 1407
Kentucky	Hardin	Glendale Junction			KY 222 to I-65	
Kentucky	Hardin	Elizabethtown			Western Kentucky Parkway west / US 31W Truck north / KY 61 south to I-65 / Bluegrass Parkway – Lexington, Louisville, Nashville, Paducah, Hodgenville	Southern end of KY 61 concurrency
Kentucky	Hardin	Elizabethtown			KY 210 east	Western terminus of KY 210
Kentucky	Hardin	Elizabethtown			KY 1136 west (New Glendale Road) to US 31W Byp.	Northern/eastern terminus of KY 1136
Kentucky	Hardin	Elizabethtown			Main Street	traffic circle around Hardin County Courthouse
Kentucky	Hardin	Elizabethtown			US 62 / KY 61 north (Mulberry Street)	Northern end of KY 61 concurrency
Kentucky	Hardin	Elizabethtown			KY 251 north (North Miles Street)	Southern terminus of KY 251
Kentucky	Hardin	Elizabethtown			KY 1357 west (St. John Road)	Eastern terminus of KY 1357
Kentucky	Hardin	Elizabethtown			KY 361 north (Cardinal Drive)	Southern terminus of KY 361
Kentucky	Hardin	Elizabethtown			US 31W Byp. south to I-65 / Western Kentucky Parkway – thru trucks	Northern terminus of US 31W Bypass
Kentucky	Hardin	Elizabethtown			KY 3005 (Ring Road)	
Kentucky	Hardin	Elizabethtown			KY 447 north	Southern terminus of KY 447
Kentucky	Hardin	Elizabethtown			KY 2802 south (W.A. Jenkins Road)	Northern terminus of KY 2802
Kentucky	Hardin	Radcliff			KY 220 west – Rineyville	Eastern terminus of KY 220
Kentucky	Hardin	Radcliff			KY 434 east – Lebanon Junction	Western terminus of KY 434
Kentucky	Hardin	Radcliff			KY 313 to I-65 – Vine Grove, Lebanon Junction	
Kentucky	Hardin	Radcliff			KY 1500 west (Millcreek Road)	
Kentucky	Hardin	Radcliff			KY 144 west (East Vine Street) – Vine Grove	Eastern terminus of KY 144
Kentucky	Hardin	Radcliff			KY 1815 south (West Lincoln Trail Boulevard)	Northern terminus of KY 1815
Kentucky	Hardin	Radcliff			North Wilson Road	interchange
Kentucky	Hardin	Fort Knox			To KY 1646 / Bullion Boulevard – Fort Knox	Interchange
Kentucky	Hardin	Fort Knox			Chaffee Avenue	interchange; entrance ramps only
Kentucky	Meade	Fort Knox			US 60 west – Hardinsburg, Owensboro	South end of US 60 concurrency
Kentucky	see US 60					
Kentucky	Jefferson	Louisville	179.2	288.4	US 31 north (Second Street / Clark Bridge) / US 31E south / US 60 east (West Market Street)	US 31W and US 31E merge to form US 31; north end of US 60 concurrency
1.000 mi = 1.609 km; 1.000 km = 0.621 mi: Concurrency terminus; Incomplete access; Route transition

== Related routes ==
=== Tennessee State Route 41 ===
State Route 41
- Location: Goodlettsville–Mitchellville
- Length: 22.96 mi (36.95 km)
- Existed: October 1, 1923–present

State Route 41 (SR 41) runs as a secret, or hidden designation, throughout US 31W's routing from the US 41 (SR 11) junction in Goodlettsville to the SR 259 junction at the Kentucky state line near Mitchellville.

Browse numbered routes
← SR 40	→ US 43

=== Bowling Green bypass ===
U.S. Route 31W Bypass
- Location: Bowling Green
- Existed: 1950s–1980s

From the 1950s to the 1980s, a bypass route of US 31W ran around Bowling Green, Kentucky. It was replaced by rerouting US 31W onto the bypass.

=== Elizabethtown bypass ===
U.S. Route 31W Bypass
- Location: Elizabethtown
- Length: 3.758 mi (6.048 km)

U.S. Route 31W By-Pass is a four-lane expressway in Elizabethtown, Kentucky. It starts at an at-grade intersection with Kentucky Route 1136, bypasses the west side of town, and ends at another at-grade intersection with US 31W on the northern side of Elizabethtown. The southern end can be reached via either KY 1136 on the south side, or following the Western Kentucky Parkway from the at-grade intersection with US 31W/KY 61 to the interchange after the WK Parkway/I-65 junction.

Major intersections include:

- Kentucky Route 1136 (Glendale Road)
- Western Kentucky Parkway (exit 135)
- U.S. Route 62 (Leitchfield Road)
- Kentucky Route 361 (Patriot Parkway)
- U.S. Route 31W (Dixie Highway)

=== Elizabethtown Truck Route ===
U.S. Route 31W Truck
- Location: Elizabethtown, Kentucky
- Length: 4.592 mi (7.390 km)

U.S. Route 31W Truck is a truck route in Elizabethtown. Its component highways include the Wendell H. Ford Western Kentucky Parkway west from the US 31W/KY 61 junction to exit 135, and the final 3.512 miles (5.652 km) of the US 31W Bypass from the WK Parkway exit 135 interchange to US 31W on the north side of town.

=== West Point Business Route ===
U.S. Route 31W Business
- Location: West Point, Kentucky
- Length: 1.988 mi (3.199 km)

U.S. Route 31W Business is a business route located in West Point, Kentucky, in northern Hardin County. It is 1.988 miles (3.199 km) long and does not intersect any other highways outside of the main alignment of US 31W (which runs concurrently with US 60 in that area).

== See also ==
- Roads in Louisville, Kentucky
- Roads in Nashville, Tennessee
