= Tennessee State Route 258 =

State highway in Tennessee, United States

State Route 258
- SR 258 highlighted in red

Route information
- Maintained by TDOT
- Length: 14.1 mi (22.7 km)
- Existed: July 1, 1983–present

Major junctions
- South end: US 31E in Hendersonville
- SR 386 in Hendersonville; US 31W in White House
- North end: SR 76 in White House

Location
- Country: United States
- State: Tennessee
- Counties: Robertson, Sumner

Highway system
- Tennessee State Routes; Interstate; US; State
← SR 257	→ SR 259

State Route 258 (SR 258) is a 14.1-mile-long (22.7 km) north–south secondary highway that traverses portions of Robertson and Sumner counties in Middle Tennessee. It is the most direct route from White House to Hendersonville.

== Route description ==
SR 258 begins in Sumner County in downtown Hendersonville at a junction with U.S. Route 31E (US 31E). It traverses and interchange with Vietnam Veterans Boulevard (SR 386, Exit 6) on the north side of town. It road bisects SR 174 (Long Hollow Pike) at Shackle Island. About 8.3 miles (13.4 km) later, it arrives at a junction with US 31W, which also marks the Robertson–Sumner county line, at White House. SR 258 ends at a junction with SR 76 between the US 31W and Interstate 65 (I-65) corridors on the Robertson County side of White House.

== Major intersections ==
County	Location	mi	km	Destinations	Notes
Sumner	Hendersonville	0.0	0.0	US 31E (W Main Street/SR 6) – Madison, Gallatin	Southern terminus
Sumner	Hendersonville			SR 386 (Vietnam Veterans Boulevard) – Nashville, Gallatin	SR 386 exit 6
Sumner	Shackle Island			SR 174 (Long Hollow Pike) – Goodlettsville, Gallatin	
Sumner–Robertson county line	White House			US 31W (SR 41) – Millersville, Cross Plains	
Robertson	White House	14.1	22.7	SR 76 to I-65 – Springfield, New Deal	Northern terminus
1.000 mi = 1.609 km; 1.000 km = 0.621 mi
