= Tennessee State Route 386 =

Highway in Tennessee

State Route 386
- Vietnam Veterans Boulevard
- SR 386 highlighted in red

Route information
- Maintained by TDOT
- Length: 17.24 mi (27.75 km)
- Existed: 1981–present

Major junctions
- West end: I-65 in Goodlettsville
- US 31E in Hendersonville; SR 258 in Hendersonville; US 31E in Hendersonville; SR 174 in Gallatin; SR 109 in Gallatin; SR 25 in Gallatin
- East end: US 31E / SR 25 / SR 174 in Gallatin

Location
- Country: United States
- State: Tennessee
- Counties: Davidson, Sumner

Highway system
- Tennessee State Routes; Interstate; US; State
← SR 385	→ SR 387

State Route 386 (SR 386) is a major east–west state route, signed north-south, located in Davidson and Sumner counties in Tennessee. It is known as Vietnam Veterans Boulevard and serves as a bypass for U.S. Highway 31E (US 31E) and a connector to Hendersonville and Gallatin from Nashville. A majority of the route is a four-lane controlled-access highway.

== Route description ==
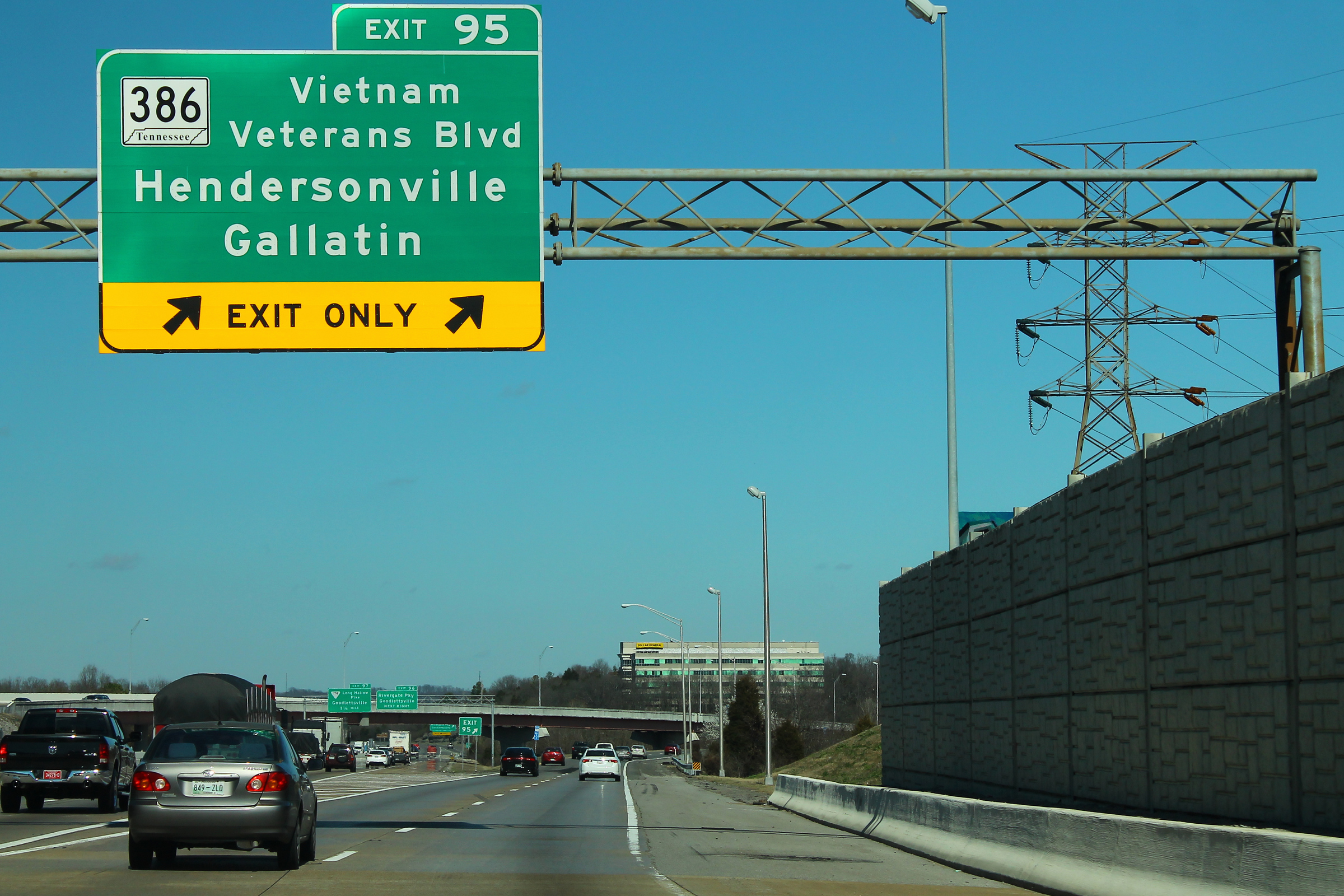
Western terminus of SR 386 on I-65 northbound

SR 386 is part of the National Highway System, a national network of roads identified as important to the United States' economy, defense, and mobility. In 2025, annual average daily traffic (AADT) counts ranged from 83,112 vehicles per day between Conference Drive and Center Point Road to 39,729 vehicles per day between Green Lea Boulevard and SR 174 (Long Hollow Pike).

SR 386 begins at a two-way partial Y interchange with Interstate 65 (I-65) in Davidson County north of Nashville. The route is only accessible from I-65 northbound, and I-65 northbound is not directly accessible from SR 386 westbound. The route begins with a 70-mile-per-hour (110 km/h) speed limit in Davidson County, which reduces to 65 mph (105 km/h) upon entering Sumner County less than a mile (1.6 km) later. About two miles (3.2 km) later the route has a trumpet interchange with a connector to US 31E, signed as US 31E. The route then curves slightly to the southeast and enters the central part of Hendersonville and has interchanges with SR 258 (New Shackle Island Road), Indian Lake Boulevard, and Saundersville Road, before coming to a partial y interchange with US 31E in what was originally the eastern terminus of the route. As a result, SR 386 curves sharply to the north, crossing US 31E and a CSX railroad again, and curves to the northeast again, and enters a mix of an urban and rural area, coming to an interchange with Big Station Camp Boulevard about three miles (4.8 km) later. SR 386 then has an interchange with Green Lea Boulevard, and about 3/4 mile (1.2 km) later it reaches an at-grade intersection with SR 174, where SR 386 ends. It is still listed in signs on SR 109 in Gallatin as a route to SR 386, in which travelers are intended to follow SR 174 (Long Hollow Pike) to SR 386.

Some maps list the portions of SR 174 and SR 25 in Gallatin as part of SR 386, although the official eastern terminus of SR 386 is at its intersection with SR 174.

=== US 31E hidden designation ===
U.S. Route 31E Bypass
- Location: Hendersonville to Gallatin, Tennessee

From exit 2 to exit 9, SR 386 carries a hidden US 31E Bypass designation.

== History ==
The route that is now SR 386 was originally proposed to provide more convenient means of transportation to Nashville for residents of Hendersonville, which had grown significantly in the 1960s and 1970s. The Hendersonville Transportation Study of 1978 listed 35 priority projects with the section through Hendersonville as number 1 and the connection to I-65 as number 2. A 1980 transportation study conducted for Nashville and Davidson County initiated the project.

Construction began on the first section, located in Hendersonville, in March 1981. This section, located between SR 258 (New Shackle Island Road) and US 31E, was completed in 1983, and the section between the US 31E connector and SR 258 was completed in 1987. These sections were initially referred to as the Hendersonville Bypass. Construction began on the extension to I-65 in 1988. The segment between Two Mile Pike and Conference Drive was opened on April 5, 1990, and the final leg of the original bypass was opened to traffic on October 4, 1990.

Beginning in November 2003, the highway was extended east to Gallatin in two separate projects after that city experienced further growth and transportation needs. This was completed on June 15, 2007.

In 2010 TDOT began studying the possibility of extending the route further east into Gallatin. Also that year the speed limit was reduced from 70 mph (110 km/h) to 65 mph (105 km/h) in Sumner County and warning signs were installed around the curve near US 31E in an effort to improve safety on the highway that had developed a high rate of traffic accidents. Early into the route's history it began to experience congestion problems during rush hour. Future plans include widening the highway to six lanes.

On December 1, 2011, a 176-vehicle pileup on SR 386 near the easternmost exit with US 31E resulted in two deaths and 16 injuries. Dense fog and black ice were believed to have contributed to the cause of the accident.

In 1987, SR 386 was renamed the Vietnam Veterans Boulevard after the efforts of the Sumner County chapter of the Vietnam Veterans of America. In 2012 the chapter worked with the Tennessee General Assembly to install signs along the highway, located each about a half mile apart, that list the names of the 25 Sumner County residents who died in the Vietnam War. In May 2026, the portion of SR 386 in Davidson County was named "Charlie Kirk Memorial Highway" by the Tennessee General Assembly after the conservative political activist who was assassinated the previous year. Signs were posted on June 16, 2026. The new name quickly drew controversy, and in early July 2026, several Vietnam veterans publicly asked that the designation be moved to a different highway. On July 20, 2026, it was announced that the Charlie Kirk Memorial Highway designation would be moved to nearby SR 174.

In the summer of 2023, the signs were changed on all of the roads that SR 386 intersects to be signed as east-west, although signs on SR 386 are still signed as north-south.

== Future ==
The Tennessee Department of Transportation (TDOT) has proposed improvements to SR 386 to address increasing traffic demand and safety concerns along the corridor.

The project includes widening SR 386 from its western terminus at I-65 to US 31E.

In Gallatin, segments are proposed for expansion to three lanes in each direction to improve capacity along the corridor. The project also includes operational and safety improvements near SR 109. The existing at-grade intersection with SR 174 (Long Hollow Pike) is proposed to be replaced with a new interchange, with a split diamond configuration identified as a preferred alternative to improve traffic flow and reduce congestion.

The project also includes access management improvements along the corridor, including the closure of the Belvedere Drive intersection and selected private driveways. A connector road is proposed to maintain access to nearby properties affected by the access closures. A right-of-way acquisition process will be required for portions of the widening and interchange construction.

Additional interchange and ramp improvements are also planned near SR 109 to improve traffic operations and safety at key junctions. The project is expected to require an estimated investment of approximately $111.8 million, with construction projected to begin in 2031.

== Exit list ==
County	Location	mi	km	Exit	Destinations	Notes
Davidson	Goodlettsville	0.00	0.00		I-65 south – Nashville	Northbound exit and southbound entrance; no direct access from southbound I-65 or to I-65 northbound; southern terminus; I-65 exit 95
Davidson	Nashville/Goodlettsville line	1.00	1.61	1	Conference Drive to I-65 north – Goodlettsville	Goodlettsville only on southbound signage
Sumner	Hendersonville	2.72	4.38	2	Center Point Road	No northbound entrance
Sumner	Hendersonville	3.21	5.17	3	US 31E (SR 6) – Hendersonville	
Sumner	Hendersonville	5.73	9.22	6	SR 258 (New Shackle Island Road) – White House, Hendersonville	
Sumner	Hendersonville	7.17	11.54	7	Indian Lake Boulevard / Drakes Creek Road	
Sumner	Hendersonville	8.89	14.31	8	Saundersville Road to US 31E (SR 6) – Hendersonville	No northbound entrance; Hendersonville only on southbound signage
Sumner	Hendersonville	9.15	14.73	9	US 31E north (SR 6) – Gallatin	No southbound exit
Sumner	Gallatin	11.95	19.23	12	Big Station Camp Boulevard	
Sumner	Gallatin	14.18	22.82	14	Green Lea Boulevard	
Sumner	Gallatin	14.94	24.04		SR 174 west (Long Hollow Pike) – Goodlettsville	Southern end of SR 174 concurrency; at-grade intersection with traffic signal; end of divided highway
Sumner	Gallatin	15.93	25.64		SR 109 – Portland, Gallatin, Lebanon	At-grade intersection with traffic signal (via a diamond interchange on SR 109); SR 386 becomes unsigned.
Sumner	Gallatin	16.89	27.18		SR 25 west – Springfield	Southern end of SR 25 concurrency; at-grade intersection
Sumner	Gallatin	17.24	27.75		US 31E (SR 6) / SR 25 east / SR 174 east	Northern end of SR 25 and SR 174 concurrencies; northern terminus; at-grade intersection
1.000 mi = 1.609 km; 1.000 km = 0.621 mi: Concurrency terminus; Incomplete access
