= Tennessee State Route 259 =

State highway in Tennessee, United States

State Route 259
- SR 259 highlighted in red

Route information
- Maintained by TDOT
- Length: 12.9 mi (20.8 km)
- Existed: July 1, 1983–present

Major junctions
- West end: US 31W on the Kentucky state line in Portland
- East end: SR 52 at Oak Grove

Location
- Country: United States
- State: Tennessee
- Counties: Sumner

Highway system
- Tennessee State Routes; Interstate; US; State
| ← SR 258 | → SR 260 |

State Route 259 (SR 259) is an east–west secondary highway that is located entirely in Sumner County in Middle Tennessee.

== Route description ==
SR 259 begins at an intersection with US 31W/SR 41 on the Kentucky–Tennessee state line. It goes east to pass through the town of Mitchellville, before winding its way southeast through farmland to enter Oak Grove and come to an end at an intersection with SR 52.

== Major intersections ==
The entire route is in Sumner County.

| Location | mi | km | Destinations | Notes |
|---|---|---|---|---|
| Portland | 0.0 | 0.0 | US 31W (SR 41) – Cross Plains, Franklin, KY | Western terminus; Kentucky state line |
| Oak Grove | 12.9 | 20.8 | SR 52 (Highway 52 W) – Portland, Westmoreland | Eastern terminus |
1.000 mi = 1.609 km; 1.000 km = 0.621 mi
