= Tennessee State Route 109 =

State highway in Tennessee, United States

State Route 109
- SR 109 highlighted in red

Route information
- Maintained by TDOT
- Length: 38.9 mi (62.6 km)
- Existed: February 15, 1929–present

Major junctions
- South end: I-840 / SR 265 in Lebanon
- I-40 in Lebanon; US 70 in Lebanon; US 31E in Gallatin; SR 174 / SR 386 in Gallatin; SR 25 in Gallatin; SR 52 in Portland; US 31W in Portland
- North end: I-65 in Portland

Location
- Country: United States
- State: Tennessee
- Counties: Wilson, Sumner, Robertson

Highway system
- Tennessee State Routes; Interstate; US; State
| ← SR 108 | → SR 110 |

State Route 109 (SR 109) is a primary state highway in Middle Tennessee. It runs from the intersection of SR 265 and Interstate 840 (I-840, exit 72) near Lebanon, north through Gallatin to the Kentucky state line and I-65 (exit 121).

SR 109 is mentioned in several country music songs, including "Church on the Cumberland Road" by Shenandoah, and "Goodbye Earl" by the Dixie Chicks. The first Cracker Barrel Restaurant was opened by Dan Evins at the corner of I-40 and SR 109 in Lebanon, Tennessee, in 1969.

== Route description ==
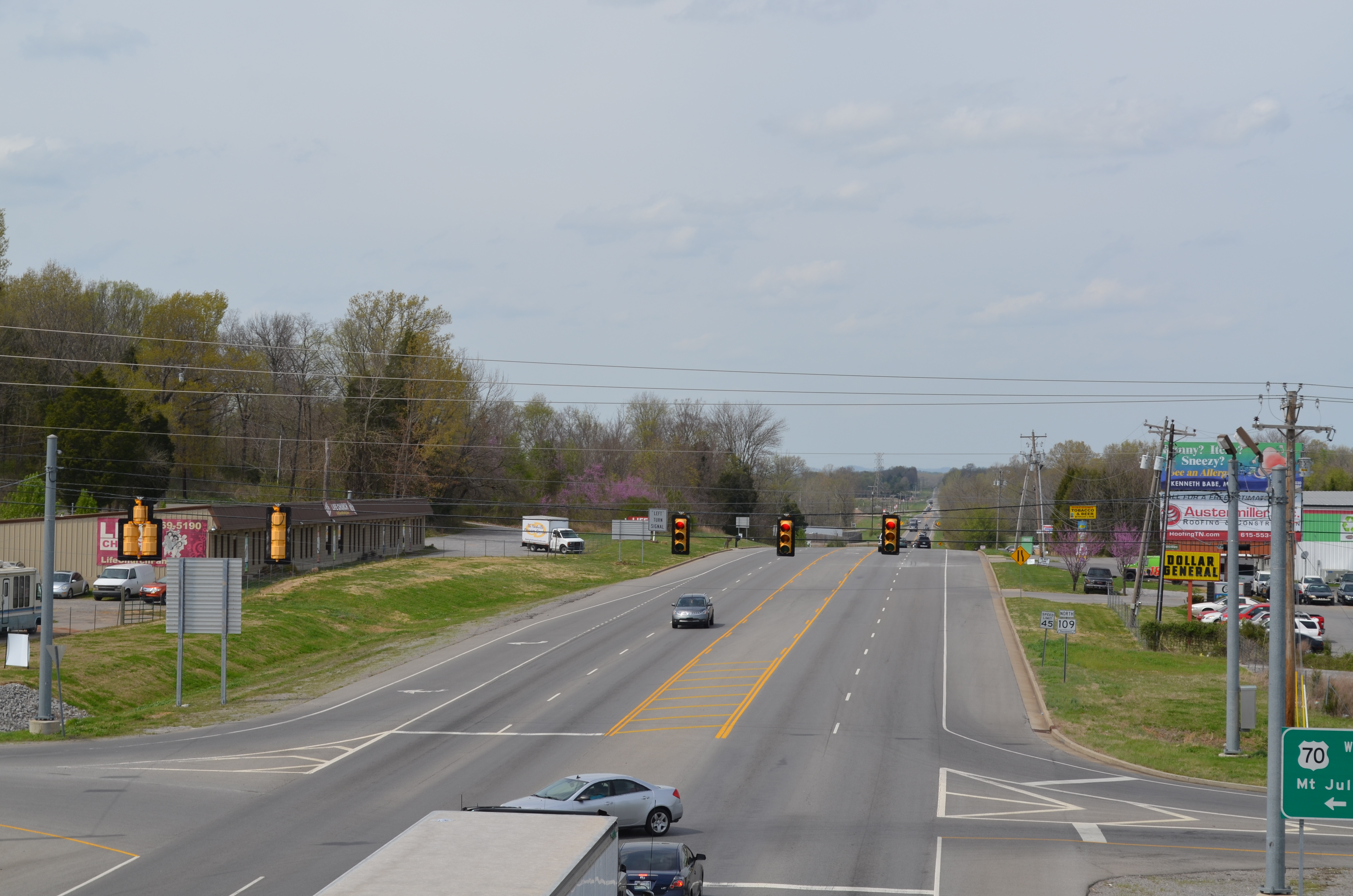
Tennessee State Route 109 in Martha, Tennessee

SR 109 begins in southern Wilson County at an interchange with I-840 and SR 265 (exit 72) near Gladeville. The highway heads north as a four-lane divided highway, concurrent with SR 265, for a few hundred feet before SR 265 splits off and goes west. SR 109 then heads north to enter Lebanon and have an interchange with I-40 (exit 232) and pass through a small business district, where it passes by the original Cracker Barrel. The highway then becomes undivided and continues north through rural areas before entering an industrial area and having an interchange with US 70/SR 24 in the Martha area before leaving Lebanon, still as a 4-lane undivided highway with a center turn lane. SR 109 then passes through LaGuardo before crossing the Cumberland River into Sumner County.

SR 109 immediately enters Gallatin and passes through a business district before coming to an intersection with Airport Road, where it turns left onto a bypass of downtown, where it becomes a divided highway once again. SR 109 then passes several neighborhoods before having an interchange with US 31E/SR 6. It then has an interchange with SR 174/SR 386 before having an at-grade intersection with SR 25. It then has an interchange with Albert Gallatin Avenue before leaving Gallatin. SR 109 then passes through the mountains of the Highland Rim as a divided highway and then enters Portland, where it becomes an undivided four-lane highway shortly before entering downtown, where it has an intersection with SR 76. The highway passes by several homes and businesses before an intersection with SR 52 and passing through downtown. SR 109 then passes through an industrial area before narrowing to two lanes. The highway then passes through farmland before widening to a four-lane divided highway and coming to a junction with US 31W/SR 41, which marks the Robertson County line. SR 109 comes to an end shortly thereafter at an interchange with I-65 (exit 121).

== History ==
SR 109 was established as a new addition to the state highway system on February 15, 1929, in Sumner County. SR 109 originally ended at its interchange with U.S. Route 70 (US 70), but was extended southward to connect with I-40 in 1968 and in the early 2000s to connect with SR 265 and I-840. The highway is a four-lane divided highway from I-840/SR 265 to I-40 where it becomes a four-lane non-divided highway until it intersects with Airport Road and South Water Avenue in Gallatin. At that point, SR 109 becomes a four-lane divided highway once again and continues as a four-lane divided highway to just south of the intersection of SR 109 and SR 76 in Portland. The highway continues as a four-lane, non-divided highway to two miles (3.2 km) north of downtown Portland where it becomes two lanes to US 31W.

A new interchange was constructed in the mid-2000s with US 70, allowing for the free flow of traffic on US 70 with traffic signals controlling the exits onto SR 109. Prior to the reconstruction, US 70 eastbound traversed a long down-sloping hill to the at-grade intersection, which was a four-way stop until the early 2000s, before being converted to one using a standard traffic signal.

A bypass of downtown Gallatin was constructed in the 1990s, allowing traffic to divert around the city proper to the West. Control of the former SR 109 through town reverted to the city. On June 21, 2010, a newly constructed four-lane divided section of the highway opened between Gallatin and Portland to replace the original narrow, curvy two-lane portion through the Highland Rim.

A four-lane bridge over the Cumberland River replaced the old two-lane bridge that was constructed in the 1950s and demolished in 2014. In February 2018, construction began to widen the seven-mile (11 km) section between north of US 70 and south of the Cumberland River. The project was originally slated for completion in November 2020, but experienced delays and was not completed until November 2021.

A new four-lane roadway was constructed near the Tennessee–Kentucky state line, replacing a former two-lane road that previously intersected with U.S. Route 31W. As part of the project, SR 109 was extended to terminate at I-65, where a new interchange was built at Exit 121 near Portland, Tennessee. The project was developed by the Tennessee Department of Transportation (TDOT) to improve regional mobility and support economic development in northern Sumner County.

Construction of the interchange and roadway improvements was completed on November 27, 2019, when the new connection was officially opened to traffic.

== Future ==
The Tennessee Department of Transportation (TDOT) is developing the SR 109 Portland Bypass, a new four-lane, partial access-controlled highway designed to route traffic around Portland, Tennessee. The project extends approximately 7.2 miles (11.6 km) west of downtown Portland, connecting existing segments of SR 109 south of SR 76 to SR 109 north of the city. The bypass is intended to improve traffic flow, reduce congestion through downtown Portland, and enhance regional mobility along a key north–south corridor between I-40 and I-65.

=== Planned ===
Plans for a bypass around Portland were developed to address increasing traffic volumes and safety concerns along the existing SR 109 alignment through the city. Studies conducted by TDOT identified the need for a western bypass to divert through traffic, particularly freight traffic, away from downtown Portland. The project was subsequently advanced in phases due to funding and right-of-way acquisition considerations.

=== Construction ===
The project is being constructed in two phases.

==== Phase 1 ====
Phase 1 consists of the northern segment of the bypass, extending north of SR 52. Construction includes a divided highway with two lanes in each direction, a grade-separated interchange at SR 52, a bridge over College Street, and multiple connector roads. Construction began in 2025 and is expected to be completed in spring 2028.

==== Phase 2 ====
Phase 2 consists of the southern segment of the bypass, which will extend the route south of SR 52 to reconnect with existing SR 109 near SR 76. Plans include additional at-grade intersections, connector roads, and a proposed flyover ramp at the southern terminus to allow free-flowing traffic movements. As of 2026, Phase 2 is in the right-of-way acquisition stage, with construction expected to begin in fiscal year 2028.

== Major intersections ==
| County | Location | mi | km | Destinations | Notes |
|---|---|---|---|---|---|
| Wilson | Lebanon | 0.0 | 0.0 | I-840 / SR 265 east (Central Pike) – Murfreesboro, Watertown | Southern end of SR 265 concurrency; southern terminus of SR 109; I-840 exit 72 |
| Wilson | Lebanon | | | SR 265 west (Central Pike) – Mount Juliet, Hermitage | Northern end of SR 265 concurrency |
| Wilson | Lebanon | | | I-40 – Nashville, Knoxville | I-40 exit 232 |
| Wilson | Lebanon | | | US 70 (Lebanon Road/SR 24) – Mount Juliet, Lebanon | Interchange |
| Sumner | Gallatin | | | South Water Avenue – Downtown Gallatin; Airport Road – Bledsoe Creek State Park, Sumner County Regional Airport | SR 109 turns westward, South Water Avenue and Airport Road are continuations |
| Sumner | Gallatin | | | US 31E (Nashville Highway/SR 6) – Hendersonville, Westmoreland | Interchange |
| Sumner | Gallatin | | | SR 386 south / SR 174 (Long Hollow Pike) – Hendersonville, Shackle Island | Interchange |
| Sumner | Gallatin | | | SR 25 – Gallatin, Cross Plains | |
| Sumner | Gallatin | | | Albert Gallatin Road – Gallatin | Interchange |
| Sumner | Portland | | | SR 76 west (Portland-White House Road) – White House | Eastern terminus of SR 76 |
| Sumner | Portland | | | SR 52 (Maple Street) – Westmoreland, Orlinda | |
| Sumner–Robertson county line | Portland | 38.3 | 61.6 | US 31W (SR 41) – White House, Franklin, Kentucky | |
| Robertson | | 38.9 | 62.6 | I-65 – Nashville, Louisville | I-65 exit 121; northern terminus of SR 109; road continues as Vaughn Parkway; opened November 27, 2019 |
1.000 mi = 1.609 km; 1.000 km = 0.621 mi: Concurrency terminus
