= U.S. Route 31E =

Highway in the United States

U.S. Route 31E
- US 31E highlighted in red

Route information
- Length: 190.9 mi (307.2 km)

Major junctions
- South end: US 31 / US 31W / US 41 / US 431 in Nashville, TN
- US 231 near Bransford, TN; I-265 in Louisville, KY; I-264 in Louisville, KY
- North end: US 31 / US 31W / US 60 in Louisville, KY

Location
- Country: United States
- States: Tennessee, Kentucky
- Counties: TN: Davidson, Sumner; KY: Allen, Barren, Hart, LaRue, Nelson, Spencer, Bullitt, Jefferson

Highway system
- United States Numbered Highway System; List; Special; Divided
- Kentucky State Highway System; Interstate; US; State; Parkways
- Tennessee State Routes; Interstate; US; State
← US 31	KY	→ US 31W
← US 31	TN	→ US 31W

U.S. Route 31E (US 31E) is the eastern parallel route for U.S. Highway 31 from Nashville, Tennessee, to Louisville, Kentucky.

== Route description ==
=== Tennessee ===
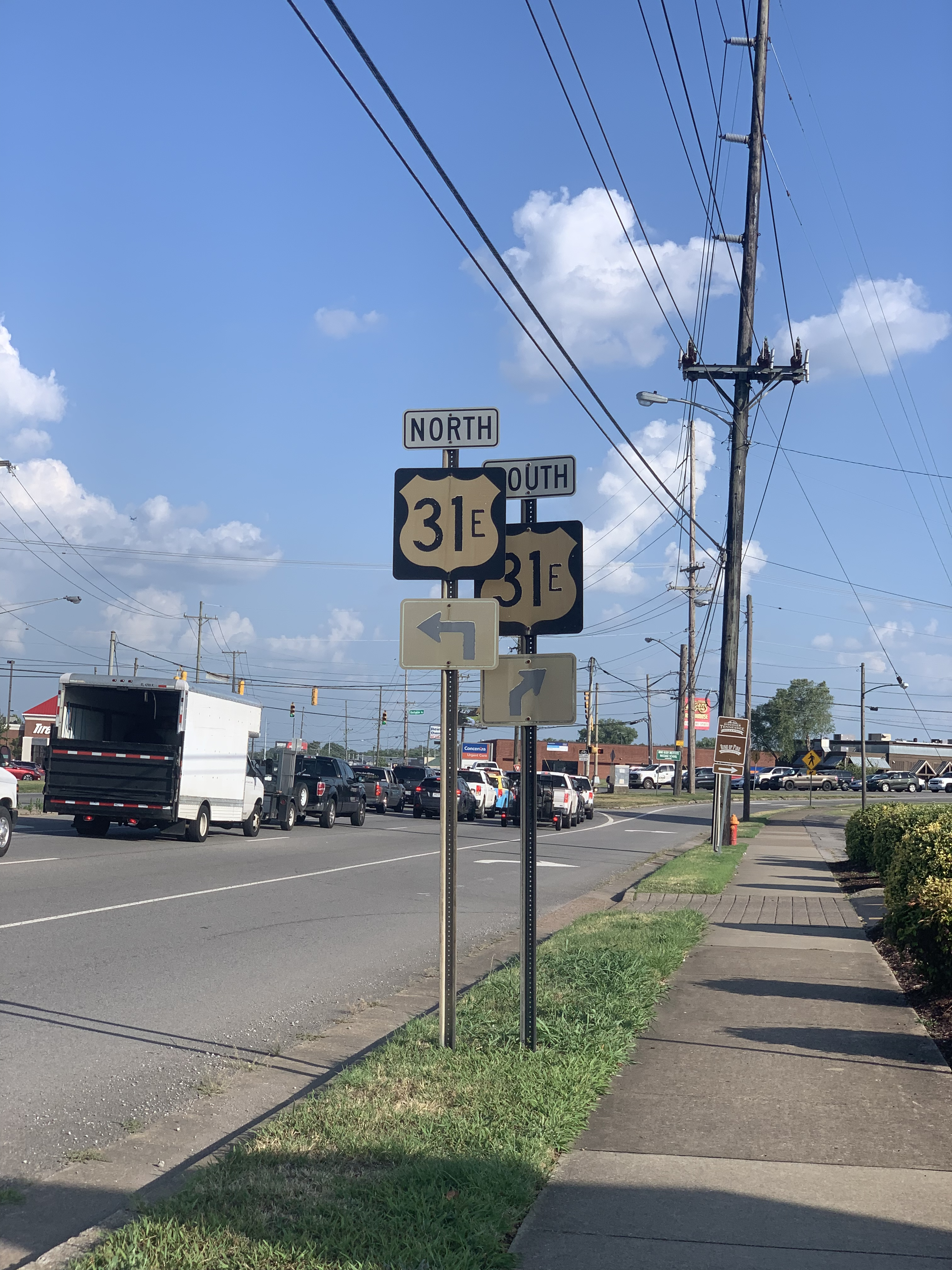
1961-style shields on Rivergate Parkway

US 31E begins as the Ellington Parkway at the corner of Main Street and US 31, US 31W, US 41 and US 431 (Spring Street) just east of Interstate 24 (I-24). It never intersects Interstate 40. The freeway's interchanges in the middle of the route mainly includes locally maintained streets such as Cleveland Street, East Trinity Lane, Hart Lane, and Broadmoor Drive.

Ellington Parkway ends at an interchange with SR 155 (Briley Parkway), about 0.56 miles (900 m) east of the Briley's I-65 junction. A ramp directing Ellington Parkway's northbound traffic to I-65 north is provided at the Briley/Ellington junction. Access to Ellington Parkway southbound is also provided by a ramp from I-65 south via exit 90A. The road is named for former Tennessee Governor Buford Ellington, who served two non-consecutive terms from 1959 to 1963, the other from 1967 to 1971. Ellington encouraged much road building throughout the state during his second term as governor.

After a brief concurrency with SR 155, the highway passes through Madison before entering Sumner County, where it passes through the cities of Hendersonville and Gallatin, Tennessee. It begins a concurrency with US 231 just east of Bethpage.

=== Kentucky ===
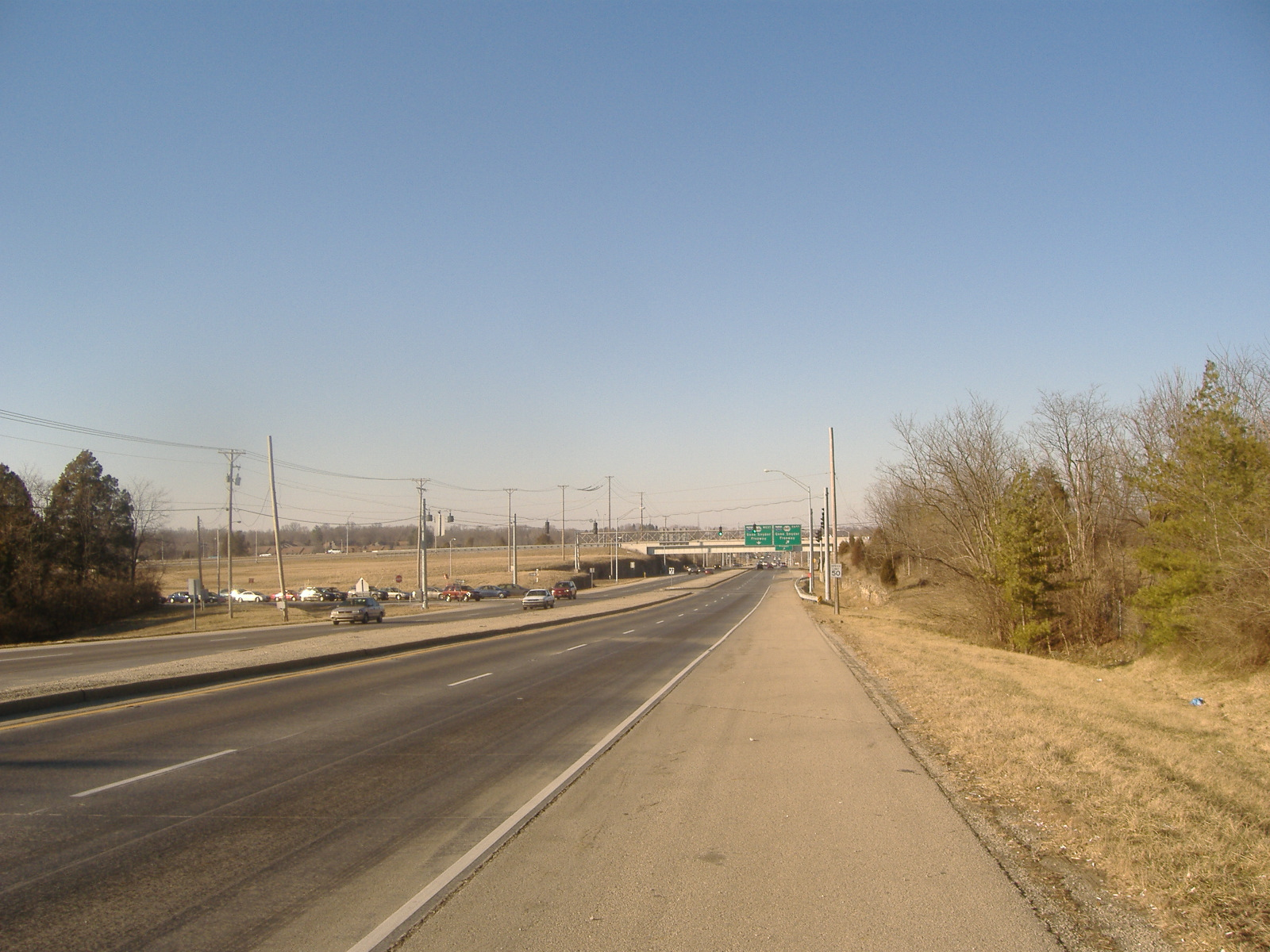
Junction of U.S. Route 31E and Interstate 265

U.S. Route 31E is the easternmost of two parallel routes for US 31 in Kentucky; between each is I-65. Going north from the Kentucky–Tennessee border, the highway goes through the towns of Scottsville (where the US 231 concurrency ends), Glasgow, Hardyville, Hodgenville, New Haven, Bardstown, and Mount Washington before arriving at its northern end in downtown Louisville at the junction of US 31W and US 31 just south of the George Rogers Clark Memorial Bridge.

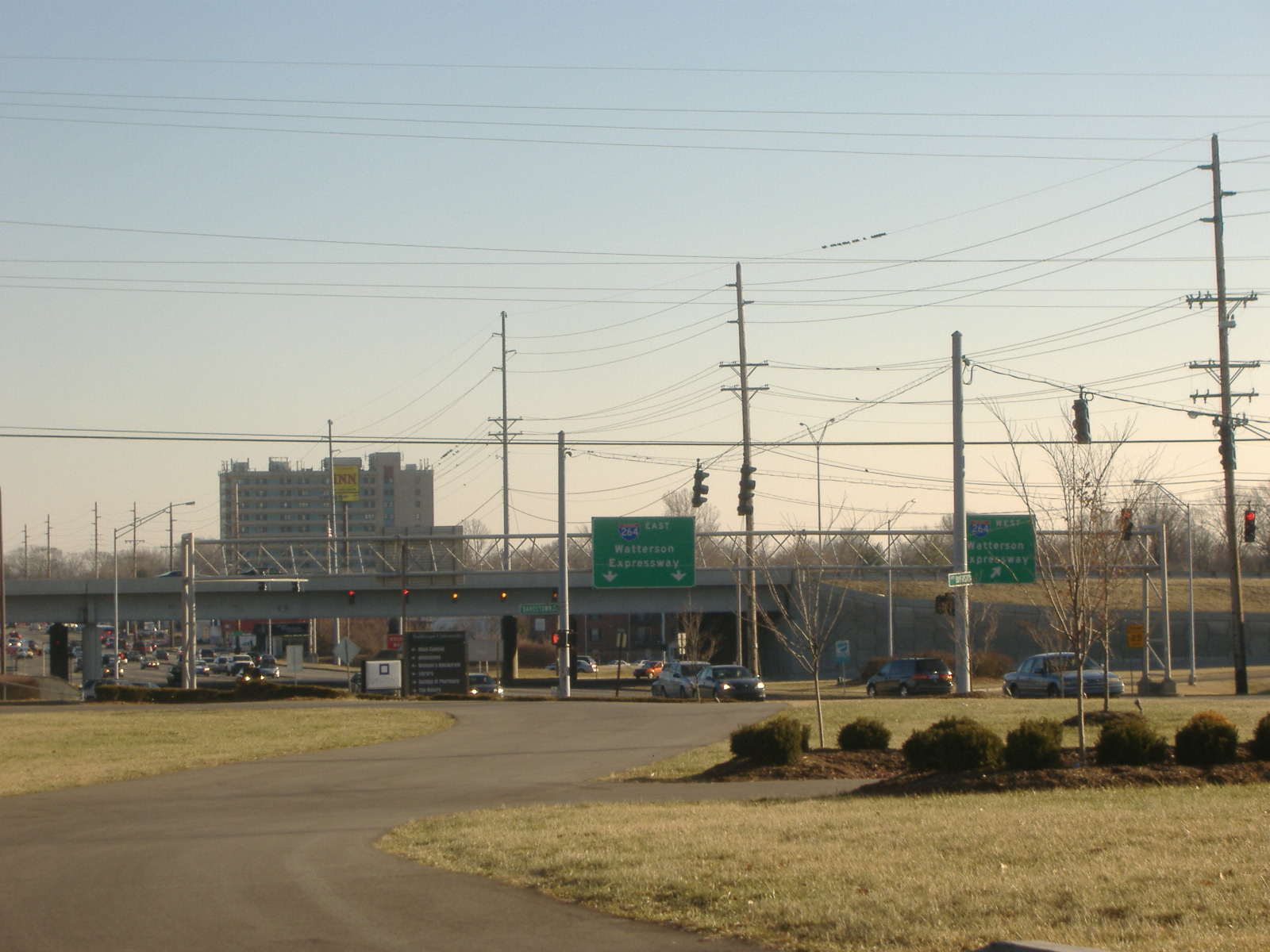
Junction of U.S. Route 31E and Interstate 264

Its only interchanges with Interstates are in Jefferson County; both of which are beltways: I-265/Gene Snyder Expressway and the Interstate 264 (Watterson Expressway). However, it also has interchanges with the Louie B. Nunn Cumberland Expressway in Barren County, and the Martha Layne Collins Blue Grass Parkway in Nelson County.

== History ==
In the 19th century, much of the present-day route of US 31E was a stagecoach path between Louisville and Nashville, and before that a postal route at least by 1820.

Originally part of the Jackson Highway, the Works Progress Administration measured the total distance on US 31E in Kentucky as 147.8 miles (237.9 km).

=== US 37 and US 143 ===

The American Association of State Highway Officials (AASHO) adopted a resolution against split routes in 1934. To eliminate the split in US 31 between Nashville, Tennessee, and Louisville, Kentucky, AASHO commissioned U.S. Route 37, replacing US 31E from the Louisville area south to Glasgow, Kentucky, where it then followed Kentucky Route 63 (KY 63) and several routes in Tennessee to Chattanooga. The rest of US 31E from Glasgow to Nashville was assigned U.S. Route 143. This proposed route was extended southwest to Centerville in 1938 and Jackson in 1944 via SR 100 and SR 20. US 31W would have become the main route of US 31.

Kentucky and Tennessee refused to accept the renumbering and never changed signage for the routes. In 1952, AASHO re-recognized the split, officially restoring the US 31E and US 31W designations.

=== US 31E in Southern Indiana ===
US 31E and US 31W once terminated at US 31 in Sellersburg, Indiana, until 1980. US 31E followed the current routing of US 31 from Sellersburg to Louisville.

=== Rerouting of US 31E in east Nashville ===
In Nashville, US 31E once followed Gallatin Pike through east Nashville. Sometime after 1997, US 31E was rerouted onto Ellington Parkway.

=== Dangerous segments ===
US 31E has been known as a dangerous road, with many risky spots. A historic one was at Coxs Creek in Nelson County, where a post office had to be relocated so traffic could see each other. Other dangerous spots in Nelson County where emergency personnel consider notorious are Gobel Lake Curve, Hibbs Lane, and High Grove. As of August 23, 2017, the Hibbs Lane and High Grove reroute sections are almost complete and are in service. Minor work is still being done on some intersections and signage.

== Points of interest ==
There are various historical sites along US 31E in Kentucky. Among them are Cave Hill Cemetery and Farmington Historic Plantation in Louisville, My Old Kentucky Home State Park in Bardstown, and Abraham Lincoln Birthplace National Historical Park near Hodgenville. Also, five historic monuments to the Civil War are along the path: three in Louisville, one in Bardstown, and one in Glasgow.

== Major intersections ==
All exits are unnumbered.

State	County	Location	mi	km	Destinations	Notes
Tennessee	Davidson	Nashville	0.00	0.00	US 31 / US 41 / US 431 south (James Robertson Parkway west/SR 6/SR 11 south) / US 31W	US 31 splits into US 31E and US 31W; south end of SR 6 overlap; south end of freeway (Ellington Parkway)
Tennessee	Davidson	Nashville	0.00	0.00	Main Street	Southbound exit and northbound entrance
Tennessee	Davidson	Nashville	0.00	0.00	To I-24 / I-65; Spring Street ( US 31W / US 41 / US 431 / SR 11)	Southbound exit and northbound entrances; access to US 31W/US 41/US 431/SR 11 south via Main St. exit
Tennessee	Davidson	Nashville	0.9– 1.2	1.4– 1.9	Cleveland Street	
Tennessee	Davidson	Nashville	1.6– 1.9	2.6– 3.1	Douglas Avenue	
Tennessee	Davidson	Nashville	2.4– 2.6	3.9– 4.2	Trinity Lane	
Tennessee	Davidson	Nashville	3.3– 3.7	5.3– 6.0	Hart Lane / Ben Allen Road	
Tennessee	Davidson	Nashville	4.1– 4.3	6.6– 6.9	Broadmoor Drive	
Tennessee	Davidson	Nashville	4.9– 5.5	7.9– 8.9	I-65 north – Louisville	Northbound exit and southbound entrance; I-65 south exit 90A
Tennessee	Davidson	Nashville	4.9– 5.5	7.9– 8.9	SR 155 west (Briley Parkway) to I-65 south	Northern terminus of Ellington Parkway; northbound left exit and southbound entrance
Tennessee	Davidson	Nashville	4.9– 5.5	7.9– 8.9	Briarville Road	SR 155 exit 15A; northbound access via exit to SR 155 west
Tennessee	Davidson	Nashville	4.9– 5.5	7.9– 8.9	I-65 north – Louisville	Southbound exit only; SR 155 exit 15C
Tennessee	Davidson	Nashville	4.9– 5.5	7.9– 8.9	SR 155 west (Briley Parkway) to I-65 south – Nashville	South end of SR 155 overlap; southbound left exit and northbound left entrance; SR 155 exit 15B
Tennessee	Davidson	Nashville	5.8– 6.1	9.3– 9.8	SR 155 east (Briley Parkway) / Gallatin Road south	North end of SR 155 overlap; north end of freeway section; SR 155 exit 14
Tennessee	Davidson	Madison	8.0	12.9	SR 45 (Old Hickory Boulevard) – Old Hickory, Lakewood, Whites Creek	
Tennessee	Davidson	Madison	10.5	16.9	To I-65 / Rivergate Parkway west	Eastern terminus of Rivergate Parkway; provides access to Rivergate Mall
Tennessee	Sumner	Hendersonville	13.0– 13.3	20.9– 21.4	SR 386 – Gallatin, Nashville	SR 386 exit 3; access via unsigned US 31E Byp.
Tennessee	Sumner	Hendersonville	14.5	23.3	SR 258 north (New Shackle Island Road)	Southern terminus of SR 258
Tennessee	Sumner	Hendersonville	19.1	30.7	SR 386 north	Interchange; northbound exit only
Tennessee	Sumner	Hendersonville	19.4	31.2	SR 386 south (Vietnam Veterans Boulevard) – Nashville	Interchange; SR 386 exit 9; southbound exit and northbound entrance; eastern terminus of unsigned US 31E Byp.
Tennessee	Sumner	Gallatin	25.3– 25.5	40.7– 41.0	SR 109 / to Airport Road / Steam Plant Road – Portland, Lebanon, Bledsoe Creek State Park, Airport	Interchange
Tennessee	Sumner	Gallatin	26.4	42.5	SR 25 (Red River Road/W Main Street/ SR 174 west)	South end of SR 174 overlap; SR 25 east serves Sumner County Regional Airport
Tennessee	Sumner	Gallatin	26.9	43.3	SR 174 east (N Water Avenue)	North end of SR 174 overlap
Tennessee	Sumner	Gallatin	29.3	47.2	Airport Road to Steam Plant Road - Bledsoe Creek State Park, Airport	
Tennessee	Sumner	Bransford	39.1	62.9	US 231 south (SR 376 south) – Hartsville, Lebanon	South end of US 231 overlap
Tennessee	Sumner	Westmoreland	43.7	70.3	SR 52 to I-65 – Portland, Lafayette	
Tennessee–Kentucky line			50.65 0.000	81.51 0.000	End concurrency with unsigned SR 6	
Kentucky	Allen		2.129	3.426	KY 482 / KY 3521 south (Andrew Jackson Highway)	
Kentucky	Allen		3.737	6.014	KY 1147 east	Western terminus of KY 1147
Kentucky	Allen	Scottsville	7.415	11.933	KY 100 (Franklin Road) – Franklin, Scottsville	
Kentucky	Allen	Scottsville	8.607	13.852	US 231 north / KY 980 east – Bowling Green, Scottsville	north end of US 231 overlap; western terminus of KY 980
Kentucky	Allen		10.582	17.030	KY 101 – Smiths Grove, Scottsville	
Kentucky	Allen		13.154	21.169	KY 3499 south	Northern terminus of KY 3499
Kentucky	Allen		16.893	27.187	KY 252 north / KY 1855 south – Bailey's Point Dam, Peninsula, Walnut Creek	Southern terminus of KY 252; northern terminus of KY 1855
Kentucky	Barren River Lake				Bridge	
Kentucky	Barren	Barren River Lake State Resort Park	20.392	32.818	KY 87 east (Austin-Tracy Road) – Austin boat ramp	Western terminus of KY 87
Kentucky	Barren	Lucas	23.222	37.372	KY 1318 east	South end of KY 1318 overlap
Kentucky	Barren	Lucas	23.317	37.525	KY 1318 west – The Narrows	North end of KY 1318 overlap
Kentucky	Barren	Haywood	29.147	46.908	KY 252 south	Northern terminus of KY 252
Kentucky	Barren	Glasgow	31.091	50.036	KY 2207 west	Eastern terminus of KY 2207
Kentucky	Barren	Glasgow	31.573– 31.631	50.812– 50.905	Cumberland Expressway / US 68 Truck east / KY 90 Truck east – Somerset, Bowling Green	Cumberland Parkway exit 11; south end of US 68 Truck / KY 90 Truck overlap
Kentucky	Barren	Glasgow	32.010	51.515	US 31E Bus. north (Green Street) to KY 63 – Glasgow Business District	
Kentucky	Barren	Glasgow	32.469	52.254	KY 1297 (Cleveland Avenue)	
Kentucky	Barren	Glasgow	33.428	53.797	US 68 Bus. / US 68 Truck west / KY 90 east (West Main Street)	North end of US 68 Truck / KY 90 Truck overlap; south end of KY 90 overlap
Kentucky	Barren	Glasgow	34.019	54.748	KY 90 west (Happy Valley Road) to I-65 – Cave City, Glasgow Business District	North end of KY 90 overlap
Kentucky	Barren	Glasgow	35.031	56.377	US 31E Bus. south – SKYCTC Glasgow Campus	
Kentucky	Barren	Glasgow	36.124	58.136	US 68 / KY 80 (Veterans Outer Loop) to KY 90	
Kentucky	Barren	Griderville	42.216	67.940	KY 70 – Cave City, Hiseville	
Kentucky	Hart	Bear Wallow	45.121	72.615	KY 2195 south (Cave City-Bear Wallow Road)	Northern terminus of KY 2195
Kentucky	Hart	Wigwam Village	46.654	75.082	KY 218 – Horse Cave, Greensburg	
Kentucky	Hart	Uno	49.998	80.464	KY 571	
Kentucky	Hart	Hardyville	53.405	85.947	KY 88 – Munfordville, Greensburg	
Kentucky	Hart		55.570	89.431	KY 1572 east	Western terminus of KY 1572
Kentucky	Hart	Canmer	56.169	90.395	KY 1854 west (Boyds Knob Road)	Eastern terminus of KY 1854
Kentucky	Hart	Canmer			KY 677 east	Western terminus of KY 677
Kentucky	Hart	Linwood	56.862	91.511	KY 566 east	Western terminus of KY 566
Kentucky	Hart	Linwood	60.179	96.849	KY 569 south	South end of KY 569 overlap
Kentucky	Hart	Linwood	60.429	97.251	KY 569 north	North end of KY 569 overlap
Kentucky	Hart	Jonesville	63.217	101.738	KY 936	
Kentucky	LaRue	Magnolia	67.154	108.074	KY 1079 south	Northern terminus of KY 1079
Kentucky	LaRue	Magnolia	67.436	108.528	KY 470 east – Buffalo	Western terminus of KY 470
Kentucky	LaRue		74.362	119.674	KY 61 south – Greensburg, Mount Sherman, Buffalo	South end of KY 61 overlap
Kentucky	LaRue	Hodgenville	75.922	122.185	KY 61 north / KY 1618 east to I-65 – Elizabethtown, Campbellsville	North end of KY 61 overlap
Kentucky	LaRue	Hodgenville	77.116	124.106	KY 84 west to I-65 - Sonora	South end of KY 84 overlap
Kentucky	LaRue	Hodgenville	77.575	124.845	KY 210 west – Elizabethtown	South end of KY 210 overlap; traffic circle around city park
Kentucky	LaRue	Hodgenville			KY 210 east – Campbellsville	North end of KY 210 overlap
Kentucky	LaRue	Ovesen Heights	79.343	127.690	KY 1794 east	Western terminus of KY 1794
Kentucky	LaRue		79.385	127.758	KY 1832 west	Eastern terminus of KY 1832
Kentucky	LaRue	White City	81.112	130.537	KY 470 west	South end of KY 470 overlap
Kentucky	LaRue	White City	81.218	130.708	KY 84 east – Lebanon	North end of KY 84 overlap
Kentucky	LaRue	White City	81.382	130.972	KY 470 east	North end of KY 470 overlap
Kentucky	Nelson	New Haven	88.031	141.672	KY 52 east – Lebanon, Trappist	South end of KY 52 overlap
Kentucky	Nelson	New Haven	88.283	142.078	KY 52 west – Lyons Station	North end of KY 52 overlap
Kentucky	Nelson	Culvertown	93.090	149.814	KY 247 south	Northern terminus of KY 247
Kentucky	Nelson		93.865	151.061	KY 46 west	South end of KY 46 overlap
Kentucky	Nelson	Balltown	96.278	154.944	KY 46 east	North end of KY 46 overlap
Kentucky	Nelson		99.186– 99.225	159.624– 159.687	Bluegrass Parkway / US 31E Truck north – Lexington, Elizabethtown	Bluegrass Parkway exit 21; southern terminus of US 31E Truck
Kentucky	Nelson	Bardstown	101.225	162.906	US 62 west (West Stephen Foster Avenue) – Elizabethtown, Airport	South end of US 62 overlap
Kentucky	Nelson	Bardstown	101.488	163.329	US 62 east / US 150 east (East Stephen Foster Avenue) to Bluegrass Parkway east / South Third Street	North end of US 62 overlap; south end of US 150 overlap; traffic circle around Old Courthouse Building
Kentucky	Nelson	Bardstown	101.905	164.000	KY 1430 west (West Beall Avenue)	Eastern terminus of KY 1430
Kentucky	Nelson	Bardstown	102.693	165.268	KY 245 / US 31E Truck south / US 150 Truck east to I-65 / Bluegrass Parkway	Northern terminus of US 31E Truck; western terminus of US 150 Truck
Kentucky	Nelson	Bardstown	104.022	167.407	KY 332 west (Old Nazareth Road)	Eastern terminus of KY 332
Kentucky	Nelson	Coxs Creek	107.829	173.534	KY 509 – Fairfield	
Kentucky	Nelson		112.252	180.652	KY 523 south	Northern terminus of KY 523
Kentucky	Nelson		113.205	182.186	KY 480 west	Eastern terminus of KY 480
Kentucky	Nelson	Highgrove	114.106	183.636	KY 48 east – Fairfield, Bloomfield	Western terminus of KY 48
Kentucky	Spencer	No major junctions				
Kentucky	Bullitt		117.993	189.891	KY 2674 north	Southern terminus of KY 2674
Kentucky	Bullitt	Mount Washington	119.822	192.835	US 31EX north	Southern terminus of US 31EX
Kentucky	Bullitt	Mount Washington	120.495	193.918	KY 44 – Mount Washington Business District	
Kentucky	Bullitt		122.064	196.443	US 31EX south – Mount Washington Business District	Northern terminus of US 31EX
Kentucky	Jefferson	Louisville	122.432	197.035	KY 660 east (Waterford Road)	Western terminus of KY 660
Kentucky	Jefferson	Louisville	124.285	200.017	KY 2053 west (Thixton Lane)	Eastern terminus of KY 2053
Kentucky	Jefferson	Louisville	127.134– 127.435	204.602– 205.087	I-265 (Gene Snyder Freeway)	I-265 exit 7
Kentucky	Jefferson	Louisville	127.924	205.874	KY 1065 (Beulah Church Road / Seatonville Road)	
Kentucky	Jefferson	Louisville	129.608	208.584	KY 1747 (South Hurstbourne Parkway)	
Kentucky	Jefferson	Louisville	131.057	210.916	KY 1932 north (Breckenridge Lane)	Southern terminus of KY 1932
Kentucky	Jefferson	Louisville	132.264	212.858	Bardstown Road (KY 2251 north) - Buechel Business District	Southern terminus of unsigned KY 2251
Kentucky	Jefferson	Louisville			Progress Boulevard	Interchange
Kentucky	Jefferson	Louisville	133.337	214.585	Hikes Lane (KY 2052 south)	Northern terminus of unsigned KY 2052
Kentucky	Jefferson	Louisville	133.514	214.870	Bardstown Road (KY 2251 south) - Buechel Business District	Northern terminus of unsigned KY 2251
Kentucky	Jefferson	Louisville	134.407	216.307	I-264 (Watterson Expressway)	I-264 exit 16
Kentucky	Jefferson	Louisville	135.489	218.048	KY 155 south (Taylorsville Road)	Northern terminus of KY 155
Kentucky	Jefferson	Louisville	136.989	220.462	US 60 Alt. (Eastern Parkway)	
Kentucky	Jefferson	Louisville	137.786	221.745	KY 2860 (Grinstead Drive)	
Kentucky	Jefferson	Louisville	138.016	222.115	KY 1703 south (Baxter Avenue)	Northern terminus of KY 1703
Kentucky	Jefferson	Louisville	138.264	222.514	US 150 west (East Broadway)	North end of US 150 overlap
Kentucky	Jefferson	Louisville	138.904	223.544	KY 864 south (Chestnut Street)	Northern terminus of KY 864
Kentucky	Jefferson	Louisville			Market Street ( US 31E / US 60)	One-way street, inbound access only; south end of US 60 east overlap
Kentucky	Jefferson	Louisville	139.086	223.837	US 60 east (US 42 east)	One-way street, outbound access only; north end of northbound US 60 east overlap; western terminus of US 42; no access southbound
Kentucky	Jefferson	Louisville	139.086	223.837	US 60 (US 42)	One-way street, inbound access only; south end of US 60 west overlap; western terminus of US 42; no access southbound
Kentucky	Jefferson	Louisville			Jackson Street (KY 61 north)	One-way street; northern terminus of KY 61 at US 31E north (Main Street)
Kentucky	Jefferson	Louisville	139.819	225.017	Preston Street (KY 61 south) to I-64 / I-71	One-way street; northern terminus of KY 61 at US 31E north (Main Street)
Kentucky	Jefferson	Louisville			Second Street south (KY 1020 south) / Market Street ( US 31W / US 60)	Market St. is one-way street; inbound access only; northern terminus of KY 1020; north end of southbound US 60 east overlap; no northbound access
Kentucky	Jefferson	Louisville	140.250	225.710	Clark Bridge (US 31 north) / Main Street west (US 60 west) / US 31W	US 31E and US 31W merge into US 31; north end of US 60 west overlap
1.000 mi = 1.609 km; 1.000 km = 0.621 mi: Concurrency terminus; Incomplete access; Route transition

== Special routes ==
=== Hendersonville bypass route ===
U.S. Route 31E Bypass
- Location: Hendersonville, Tennessee
- Existed: 1981–present

An unsigned portion consisting primarily of Tennessee State Route 386 is known as the U.S. Route 31E Bypass.

=== Glasgow business route ===
U.S. Route 31E Business
- Location: Glasgow
- Length: 3.24 mi (5.21 km)

U.S. Route 31E Business starts near the Southgate Shopping Center 0.379 mile north of the Exit 11 interchange of the Louie B. Nunn Cumberland Parkway, and intersects Kentucky Routes 249 and 63 before reaching the Barren County Courthouse at the Public Square. It then joins US 68 Business for only 0.123 miles before right-turning onto North Race Street. US 31E Business then follows North Race Street, passes the T.J. Samson Hospital, and ends at an intersection with the regular US 31E alignment on the north side of town about one mile south of the Veterans Outer Loop.

==== Major intersections ====
The entire route is in Glasgow, Barren County.

mi	km	Destinations	Notes
0.000	0.000	US 31E (S L Rogers Wells Boulevard)	Western terminus
1.001	1.611	KY 249 south (Bunche Avenue)	Northern terminus of KY 249
1.269	2.042	KY 63 south (East College Street)	Northern terminus of KY 63
1.406	2.263	KY 80 east (East Main Street) / KY 90 east / US 68 Bus. east	Begin concurrency with KY 80/KY 90/US-Bus 68
1.516	2.440	US 68 Bus. west / KY 80 west / KY 90 west (West Main Street)	End concurrency with KY 80/KY 90/US-Bus 68
2.118	3.409	Happy Valley Road	Old KY 90; previously KY 90 Alternate
3.240	5.214	US 31E / Glasgow Bypass	Eastern terminus
1.000 mi = 1.609 km; 1.000 km = 0.621 mi: Concurrency terminus

=== U.S. Route 31E Truck ===
U.S. Route 31E Truck
- Location: Bardstown

U.S. Route 31E Truck (US 31E Truck) is the truck route of US 31E in the Nelson County seat of Bardstown.

The truck route consists of the following designations:

- Bluegrass Parkway between exits 21 and 25.
- U.S. Route 150 between the Bluegrass Parkway and KY 245, and
- Kentucky Route 245 bypass from US 150 east of downtown to US 31E/150 north of downtown.

=== U.S. Route 31EX ===
U.S. Route 31EX
- Location: Mount Washington
- Length: 2.487 mi (4.002 km)

U.S. Route 31EX (US 31EX) is the business route of US 31E in the Bullitt County town of Mount Washington. The only two major intersections it has besides the main alignment is with KY 44 and KY 2706 in the town's business district. The route is 2.487 miles (4.002 km) long. At the intersection with KY 44, US 31EX is incorrectly signed as a Kentucky state route.

==== Major intersections ====
The entire route is in Mount Washington, Bullitt County.

mi	km	Destinations	Notes
0.000	0.000	US 31E / US 150	Southern terminus
0.560	0.901	KY 44	
0.828	1.333	KY 2706 west	Eastern terminus of KY 2706
2.487	4.002	US 31E / US 150	Northern terminus
1.000 mi = 1.609 km; 1.000 km = 0.621 mi

== See also ==
- Roads in Louisville, Kentucky
- Roads in Nashville, Tennessee
