= Tennessee State Route 161 =

State highway in Tennessee, United States

State Route 161
- SR 161 highlighted in red

Route information
- Maintained by TDOT
- Length: 9.9 mi (15.9 km)

Major junctions
- South end: US 431 in Springfield
- North end: KY 102 at the Kentucky State Line near Keysburg, KY

Location
- Country: United States
- State: Tennessee
- Counties: Robertson

Highway system
- Tennessee State Routes; Interstate; US; State
← SR 160	→ SR 162

State Route 161 (SR 161) is a north–south state highway located entirely in Robertson County in Middle Tennessee. The route's southern terminus sits 0.4 miles (0.64 km) north of a junction between U.S. Route 431 (US 431) and US 41. Its northern terminus is at the Kentucky state line, where it becomes Kentucky Route 102 (KY 102).

== Route description ==
SR 161 begins in Springfield at an intersection with US 431/SR 65 north of downtown in an industrial area. The highway then leaves Springfield and continues northwest through farmland. It passes through Barren Plains, where it has a Y-Intersection with SR 25. SR 161 continues northwest to cross a bridge over the Red River before coming to the Kentucky state line, where SR 161 becomes Kentucky Route 102.

== Major intersections ==
The entire route is in Robertson County.

Location	mi	km	Destinations	Notes
Springfield	0.0	0.0	US 431 (Tom Austin Highway/SR 65) – Springfield, Adairville, KY	Southern terminus
Barren Plains	5.2	8.4	SR 25 east (Barren Plains Road) – Cross Plains	Western terminus of SR 25
	9.6– 9.7	15.4– 15.6	Bridge over the Red River	
	9.9	15.9	KY 102 north (Keysburg Road) – Allensville	Kentucky state line; northern terminus
1.000 mi = 1.609 km; 1.000 km = 0.621 mi
