= TN6 =

TN6 or TN-6 may refer to:

- Tennessee's 6th congressional district
- Tennessee State Route 6
- TN6, a postcode district in Wealden, England; see TN postcode area
