= Mitchellville, Tennessee =

- City
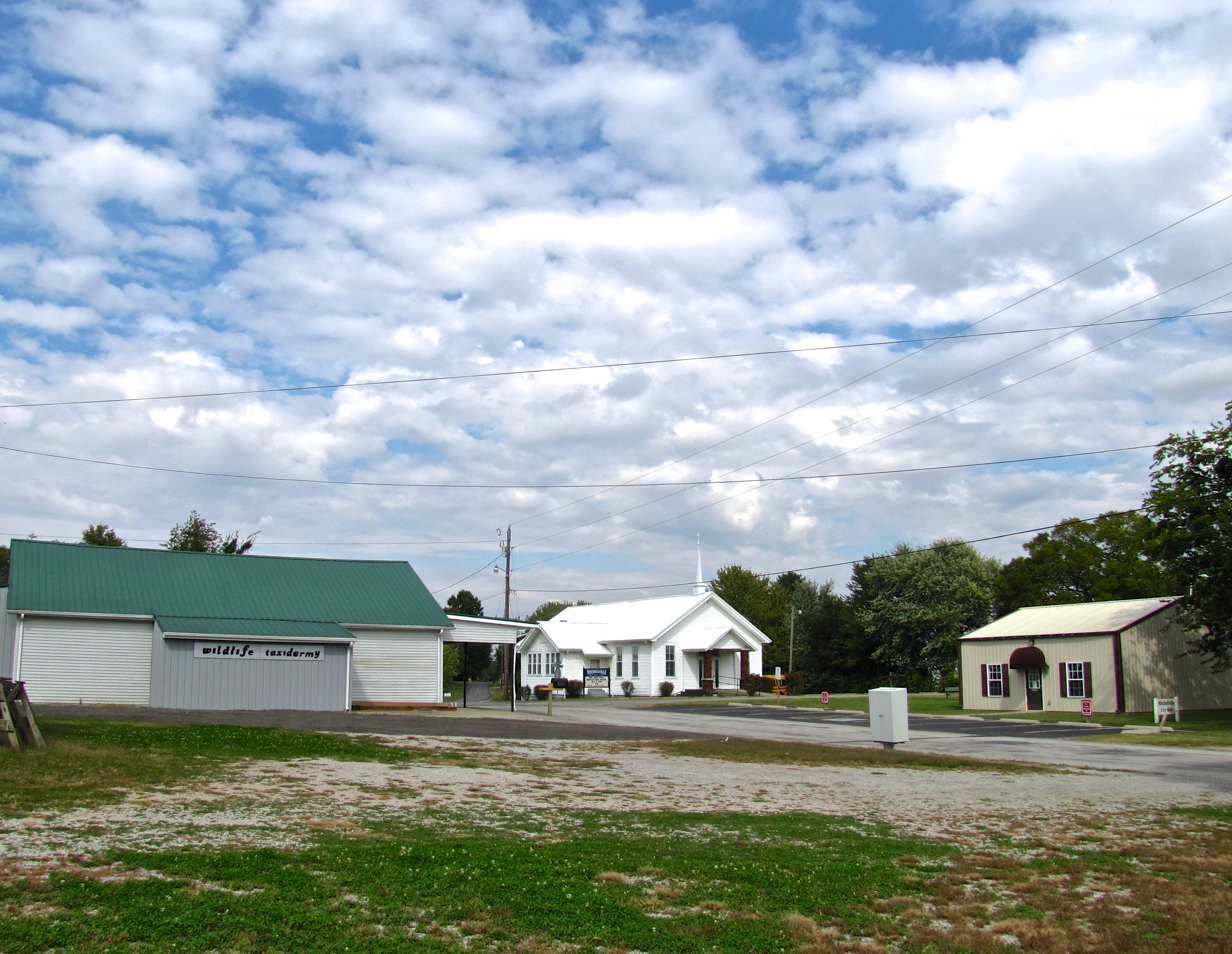
- Buildings along Church Street

- Location of Mitchellville in Sumner County, Tennessee.

- Location within Tennessee
- Coordinates: 36°37′29″N 86°32′28″W
- Country: United States
- State: Tennessee
- County: Sumner

Area
  - Total: 0.54 sq mi (1.39 km^{2})
  - Land: 0.54 sq mi (1.39 km^{2})
  - Water: 0 sq mi (0.00 km^{2})
- Elevation: 778 ft (237 m)

Population (2020)
  - Total: 163
  - Density: 303.6/sq mi (117.22/km^{2})
- Time zone: UTC-6 (Central (CST))
  - Summer (DST): UTC-5 (CDT)
- ZIP code: 37119
- Area code: 615
- FIPS code: 47-49460
- GNIS feature ID: 1306760

Mitchellville is a city in Sumner County, Tennessee, United States. As of the 2020 census, Mitchellville had a population of 163.

== History ==
Mitchellville began with the establishment of a 200-acre (81 ha) farm by Ezekiel Marshall in 1814. The community that developed around the farm was originally known as Mitchell's Cross Roads after Hiram Mitchell, who owned land near the intersection of two early roads. With the arrival of the railroad in 1859, the name of the community was changed to Mitchellville Station. The city incorporated in 1909, and thrived as a railroad stop throughout the first half of the 20th century. The city began to decline as rail traffic decreased in the 1950s, however, and never fully recovered from a destructive tornado in 1955.

== Geography ==
Mitchellville lies in north-central Tennessee, just east of the point where Sumner County, Tennessee, Robertson County, Tennessee, and Simpson County, Kentucky, meet. State Route 259 traverses Mitchellville east-to-west. To the west of the city, this highway intersects State Route 109, which connects the area to Portland, Tennessee, to the south, and U.S. Route 31W, which connects the area with Franklin, Kentucky, to the north.

According to the United States Census Bureau, the city has a total area of 0.5 square miles (1.3 km^{2}), all land.

== Demographics ==
Historical population
Census	Pop.	Note	%±
1920	161		—
1930	203		26.1%
1940	216		6.4%
1950	202		−6.5%
1960	184		−8.9%
1970	177		−3.8%
1980	209		18.1%
1990	193		−7.7%
2000	207		7.3%
2010	189		−8.7%
2020	163		−13.8%

=== 2020 census ===
As of the 2020 census, Mitchellville had a population of 163 across 63 households, including 45 families. The median age was 42.7 years. 22.1% of residents were under the age of 18 and 19.0% of residents were 65 years of age or older. For every 100 females there were 89.5 males, and for every 100 females age 18 and over there were 92.4 males age 18 and over.

0.0% of residents lived in urban areas, while 100.0% lived in rural areas.

There were 63 households in Mitchellville, of which 41.3% had children under the age of 18 living in them. Of all households, 60.3% were married-couple households, 11.1% were households with a male householder and no spouse or partner present, and 20.6% were households with a female householder and no spouse or partner present. About 4.8% of all households were made up of individuals and 1.6% had someone living alone who was 65 years of age or older.

There were 74 housing units, of which 14.9% were vacant. The homeowner vacancy rate was 7.1% and the rental vacancy rate was 0.0%.

Racial composition as of the 2020 census
Race	Number	Percent
White	146	89.6%
Black or African American	3	1.8%
American Indian and Alaska Native	0	0.0%
Asian	0	0.0%
Native Hawaiian and Other Pacific Islander	0	0.0%
Some other race	4	2.5%
Two or more races	10	6.1%
Hispanic or Latino (of any race)	6	3.7%

=== 2000 census ===
As of the census of 2000, there was a population of 207, with 75 households and 54 families residing in the city. The population density was 398.8 inhabitants per square mile (154.0/km^{2}). There were 83 housing units at an average density of 159.9 per square mile (61.7/km^{2}). The racial makeup of the city was 93.72% White, 3.86% African American, 0.97% Native American, and 1.45% from two or more races. Hispanic or Latino of any race were 1.93% of the population.

There were 75 households, out of which 29.3% had children under the age of 18 living with them, 56.0% were married couples living together, 6.7% had a female householder with no husband present, and 26.7% were non-families. 21.3% of all households were made up of individuals, and 10.7% had someone living alone who was 65 years of age or older. The average household size was 2.76 and the average family size was 3.20.

In the city, the population was spread out, with 27.1% under the age of 18, 8.2% from 18 to 24, 27.5% from 25 to 44, 24.6% from 45 to 64, and 12.6% who were 65 years of age or older. The median age was 35 years. For every 100 females, there were 115.6 males. For every 100 females age 18 and over, there were 109.7 males.

The median income for a household in the city was $37,813, and the median income for a family was $40,313. Males had a median income of $24,583 versus $21,250 for females. The per capita income for the city was $15,151. About 17.0% of families and 13.6% of the population were below the poverty line, including 24.3% of those under the age of eighteen and 6.3% of those 65 or over.
