= Rich Pond, Kentucky =

Rich Pond
- Unincorporated community
- Location within the state of Kentucky
- Coordinates: 36°53′39.15″N 86°30′33.98″W
- Country: United States
- State: Kentucky
- County: Warren
- Elevation: 587 ft (179 m)
- Time zone: UTC-6 (Central (CST))
  - Summer (DST): UTC-5 (CST)
- ZIP codes: 42104
- Area codes: 270 and 364
- GNIS feature ID: 501793

Rich Pond is an unincorporated community in Warren County, Kentucky, United States. It is part of the Bowling Green metropolitan statistical area.

== Geography ==
Rich Pond is located along U.S. Route 31W, known locally as Nashville Road, at its junction with Kentucky Route 242, about 3 miles (4.8 km) south of the Bowling Green city limits. It can be accessed directly from I-165 from Exit 4.

== Education ==
Rich Pond is home to three public schools of the Warren County Public Schools system. Rich Pond Elementary is located on KY 242 on the east side of the community. The South Warren Middle and High School building complex, which houses both the middle and high school institutions, comprises Kentucky's largest school facility.
