= Barren Plains, Tennessee =

Unincorporated community in Tennessee, US

Coordinates: 36°36′05″N 86°55′10″W

Barren Plains is an unincorporated community in Robertson County, Tennessee, in the United States.

== History ==
A post office was established at Barren Plains in 1839, and remained in operation until it was discontinued in 1907.
