= Oak Grove, Sumner County, Tennessee =

Oak Grove, Tennessee
- Census-designated place
- Location within Tennessee
- Coordinates: 36°34′14″N 86°22′48″W
- Country: United States
- State: Tennessee
- County: Sumner

Area
  - Total: 1.283 sq mi (3.32 km^{2})
  - Land: 1.283 sq mi (3.32 km^{2})
  - Water: 0 sq mi (0 km^{2})
- Elevation: 883 ft (269 m)

Population (2020)
  - Total: 238
  - Density: 186/sq mi (71.6/km^{2})
- Time zone: UTC-6 (Central (CST))
  - Summer (DST): UTC-5 (CDT)
- Area code: 615
- GNIS feature ID: 1296061

Oak Grove is a census-designated place and unincorporated community in Sumner County, Tennessee, United States. As of the 2020 census, its population was 238, slightly up from 231 at the 2010 census. Oak Grove was the hometown of trial attorney James F. Neal.
