= New Deal, Tennessee =

- Census-designated place
- Location within Tennessee
- Coordinates: 36°31′02″N 86°33′49″W
- Country: United States
- State: Tennessee
- County: Sumner

Area
  - Total: 1.90 sq mi (4.91 km^{2})
  - Land: 1.90 sq mi (4.91 km^{2})
  - Water: 0 sq mi (0.00 km^{2})
- Elevation: 919 ft (280 m)

Population (2020)
  - Total: 398
  - Density: 210.1/sq mi (81.13/km^{2})
- Time zone: UTC-6 (Central (CST))
  - Summer (DST): UTC-5 (CDT)
- Area code: 615
- GNIS feature ID: 1295468

New Deal is a census-designated place and unincorporated community in Sumner County, Tennessee, United States. Its population was 368 as of the 2010 census.

== Demographics ==
Historical population
| Census | Pop. | Note | %± |
|---|---|---|---|
| 2020 | 398 | | — |
U.S. Decennial Census

== Education ==
Oakmont Elementary School is located in New Deal.
