= White House, Tennessee =

- City
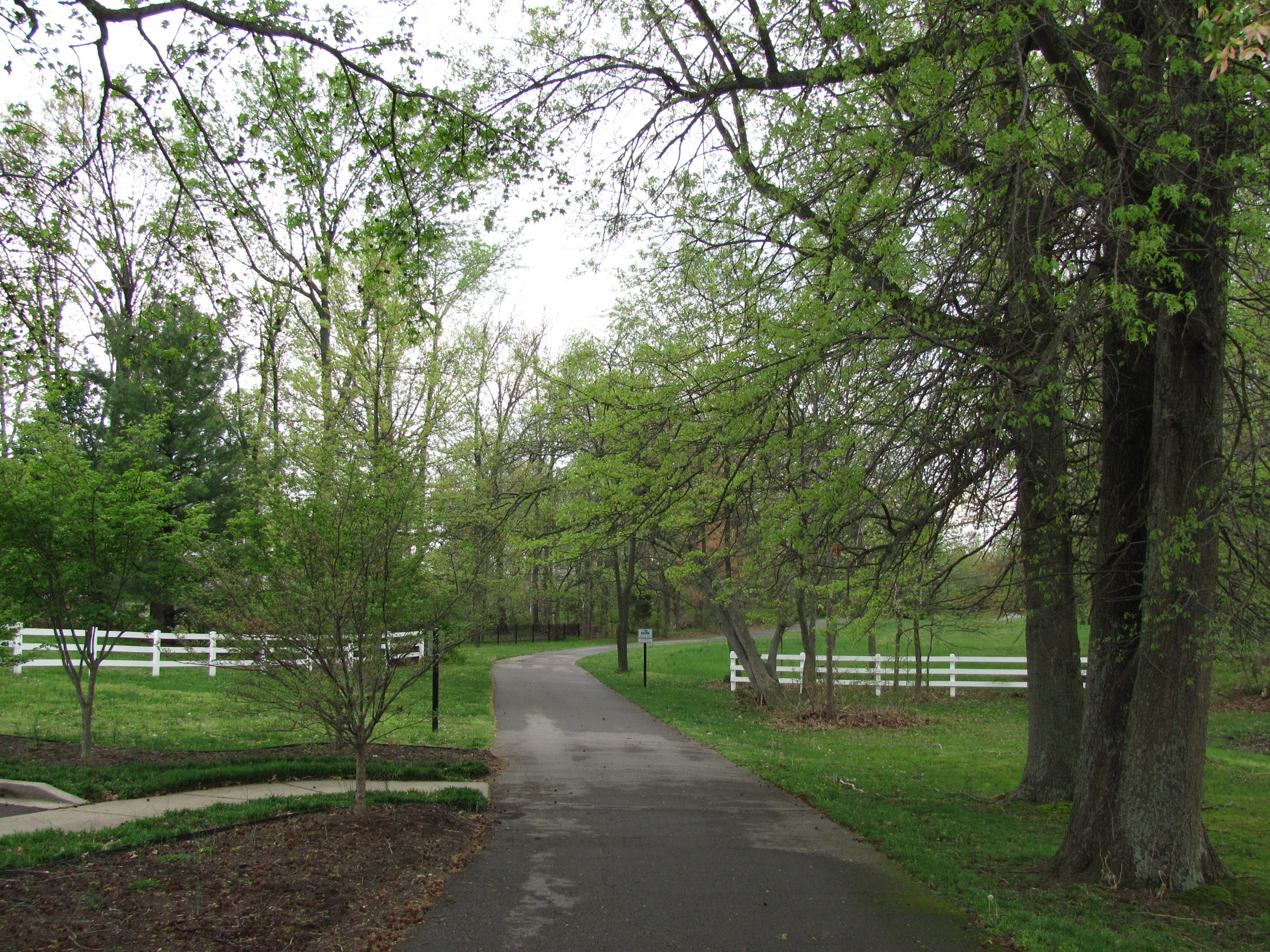
- White House Greenway

- Flag Seal
- Motto: "Valuing Our Future While Protecting Our Heritage"
- Location of White House in Robertson County, Tennessee.

- Location within Tennessee Location within the United States
- Coordinates: 36°28′13″N 86°39′05″W
- Country: United States
- State: Tennessee
- Counties: Sumner, Robertson
- Settled: 1835
- Incorporated: 1921
- Named after: Stagecoach inn around which the town developed

Government
  - Type: Mayor/Aldermen
  - Mayor: John Corbitt
  - Vice Mayor & Aldermen: Jana Singer Spicer
  - City Administrator: Gerald O. Herman
  - Chief of Police: Patrick M. Brady

Area
  - Total: 11.48 sq mi (29.74 km^{2})
  - Land: 11.48 sq mi (29.74 km^{2})
  - Water: 0 sq mi (0.00 km^{2})
- Elevation: 863 ft (263 m)

Population (2020)
  - Total: 12,982
  - Estimate (2025): 17,872
  - Density: 1,130.5/sq mi (436.47/km^{2})
- Time zone: UTC-6 (Central (CST))
  - Summer (DST): UTC-5 (CDT)
- ZIP code: 37188
- Area code(s): 615, 629
- FIPS code: 47-80200
- GNIS feature ID: 1304522
- Website: whitehousetn.gov

White House is a city in Robertson and Sumner counties in the U.S. state of Tennessee. The population was listed as 12,982 in the 2020 census and has an estimated population of 17,872 as of 2025. It is approximately 22 miles (35 km) north of downtown Nashville.

== History ==
=== Settlers ===
The area that is now White House was purchased around 1828 by Richard Stone Wilks, a settler from Virginia. A trail running from Kentucky to Nashville, originally created by Native Americans, cut through the area. This trail was originally known as the Louisville & Nashville Turnpike during the mid-19th century. In 1928, the trail was renamed US Highway 31W.

=== Naming the town ===
In the mid-19th century, the Carter, Thomas, and Hough Stagecoach Company traveled the L&N Turnpike carrying passengers. A typical stop along the way was a white, two-story house built by Wilks in 1829. The house was a popular stop for lodging, food, and changing out horses. President Andrew Jackson was even heard to have stayed here during his travels between his home and the White House. During this time, houses were rarely painted white, particularly in this underdeveloped area. The stage coach drivers began to call this stop and the surrounding area White House.

=== Original White House torn down, building replaced ===
The monument for which the town was named was torn down in 1951 to make way for new development. However, in 1986, the community erected a replica of the original building. The reproduction, called the White House Inn Library and Museum, currently sits in the center of town next to the Fire Department. It contains the library, a museum with artifacts from the area's early years, and the city's Chamber of Commerce. In 2015, the replica White House Inn Library and Museum was turned solely into a museum and Chamber of Commerce after the city built a new library.

=== Growth and development ===
White House was incorporated in 1971. Currently, the young town is experiencing population growth, economic progress, and community development, with many apartment projects and subdivisions planned for the area. There are over 800 homes planned for the area, and at least 5 apartment subdivisions are planned for the city. The city is located north of Nashville within the greater Nashville region, and is anticipated to grow rapidly in the future as a suburb of Nashville.

== Geography ==
According to the United States Census Bureau, the city has a total area of 9.0 square miles (23 km^{2}), all land.

White House is located along Interstate 65 at the intersection of State Highway 76 and US Highway 31W. The town, as of 2007, covers eleven square miles and is situated about 22 miles (35 km) north of downtown Nashville, lying in both Robertson and Sumner Counties.

=== Climate ===
Climate data for White House, Tennessee (1991–2020 normals, extremes 2001–present)
Month	Jan	Feb	Mar	Apr	May	Jun	Jul	Aug	Sep	Oct	Nov	Dec	Year
Record high °F (°C)	75 (24)	80 (27)	84 (29)	88 (31)	92 (33)	104 (40)	104 (40)	106 (41)	99 (37)	96 (36)	85 (29)	75 (24)	106 (41)
Mean maximum °F (°C)	66.0 (18.9)	70.1 (21.2)	78.2 (25.7)	84.2 (29.0)	88.1 (31.2)	93.1 (33.9)	95.0 (35.0)	95.1 (35.1)	92.3 (33.5)	86.3 (30.2)	75.3 (24.1)	68.9 (20.5)	96.9 (36.1)
Mean daily maximum °F (°C)	45.9 (7.7)	50.4 (10.2)	59.4 (15.2)	69.7 (20.9)	77.7 (25.4)	85.0 (29.4)	88.6 (31.4)	88.2 (31.2)	82.4 (28.0)	71.6 (22.0)	59.3 (15.2)	49.2 (9.6)	69.0 (20.5)
Daily mean °F (°C)	36.6 (2.6)	39.9 (4.4)	48.2 (9.0)	58.1 (14.5)	66.9 (19.4)	74.4 (23.6)	78.5 (25.8)	77.0 (25.0)	70.5 (21.4)	59.6 (15.3)	48.1 (8.9)	40.1 (4.5)	58.2 (14.5)
Mean daily minimum °F (°C)	27.4 (−2.6)	29.4 (−1.4)	37.0 (2.8)	46.5 (8.1)	56.1 (13.4)	63.8 (17.7)	68.3 (20.2)	65.7 (18.7)	58.5 (14.7)	47.6 (8.7)	36.9 (2.7)	31.1 (−0.5)	47.4 (8.5)
Mean minimum °F (°C)	7.3 (−13.7)	10.9 (−11.7)	19.6 (−6.9)	30.1 (−1.1)	40.1 (4.5)	52.6 (11.4)	58.6 (14.8)	56.0 (13.3)	46.4 (8.0)	32.3 (0.2)	20.1 (−6.6)	14.5 (−9.7)	5.3 (−14.8)
Record low °F (°C)	−5 (−21)	−1 (−18)	3 (−16)	21 (−6)	32 (0)	45 (7)	52 (11)	48 (9)	40 (4)	26 (−3)	9 (−13)	−3 (−19)	−5 (−21)
Average precipitation inches (mm)	4.25 (108)	4.53 (115)	4.93 (125)	5.34 (136)	5.73 (146)	4.27 (108)	4.77 (121)	3.97 (101)	3.89 (99)	3.78 (96)	4.11 (104)	4.78 (121)	54.35 (1,380)
Source 1: NOAA
Source 2: National Weather Service (mean maxima/minima 2006–2020)

== Demographics ==
Historical population
Census	Pop.	Note	%±
1930	239		—
1980	2,225		—
1990	2,987		34.2%
2000	7,220		141.7%
2010	10,255		42.0%
2020	12,982		26.6%
2025 (est.)	17,872		37.7%

=== 2020 census ===
As of the 2020 census, White House had a population of 12,982. The median age was 37.0 years. 25.6% of residents were under the age of 18 and 13.1% of residents were 65 years of age or older. For every 100 females there were 93.0 males, and for every 100 females age 18 and over there were 90.4 males age 18 and over.

94.9% of residents lived in urban areas, while 5.1% lived in rural areas.

There were 4,820 households in White House, of which 39.1% had children under the age of 18 living in them. Of all households, 57.7% were married-couple households, 13.2% were households with a male householder and no spouse or partner present, and 23.8% were households with a female householder and no spouse or partner present. About 21.3% of all households were made up of individuals and 9.1% had someone living alone who was 65 years of age or older.

There were 5,039 housing units, of which 4.3% were vacant. The homeowner vacancy rate was 0.9% and the rental vacancy rate was 10.6%.

Racial composition as of the 2020 census
Race	Number	Percent
White	11,378	87.6%
Black or African American	296	2.3%
American Indian and Alaska Native	36	0.3%
Asian	152	1.2%
Native Hawaiian and Other Pacific Islander	2	0.0%
Some other race	241	1.9%
Two or more races	877	6.8%
Hispanic or Latino (of any race)	614	4.7%

=== 2000 census ===
As of the census of 2000, there was a population of 7,220, with 2,497 households and 2,060 families residing in the city. The population density was 805.3 inhabitants per square mile (310.9/km^{2}). There were 2,578 housing units at an average density of 287.5 units per square mile (111.0 units/km^{2}). The racial makeup of the city was 97.35% White, 1.33% African American, 0.25% Native American, 0.35% Asian, 0.30% from other races, and 0.42% from two or more races. Hispanic or Latino of any race were 1.02% of the population.

There were 2,497 households, out of which 48.8% had children under the age of 18 living with them, 71.0% were married couples living together, 8.4% had a female householder with no husband present, and 17.5% were non-families. 15.4% of all households were made up of individuals, and 5.7% had someone living alone who was 65 years of age or older. The average household size was 2.89 and the average family size was 3.22.

In the city, the population was spread out, with 31.7% under the age of 18, 6.6% from 18 to 24, 37.8% from 25 to 44, 17.6% from 45 to 64, and 6.3% who were 65 years of age or older. The median age was 32 years. For every 100 females, there were 99.6 males. For every 100 females age 18 and over, there were 93.8 males.

The median income for a household in the city was $51,649, and the median income for a family was $55,731. Males had a median income of $38,448 versus $26,216 for females. The per capita income for the city was $19,890. About 2.3% of families and 3.3% of the population were below the poverty line, including 2.6% of those under age 18 and 9.0% of those age 65 or over.

== Government ==
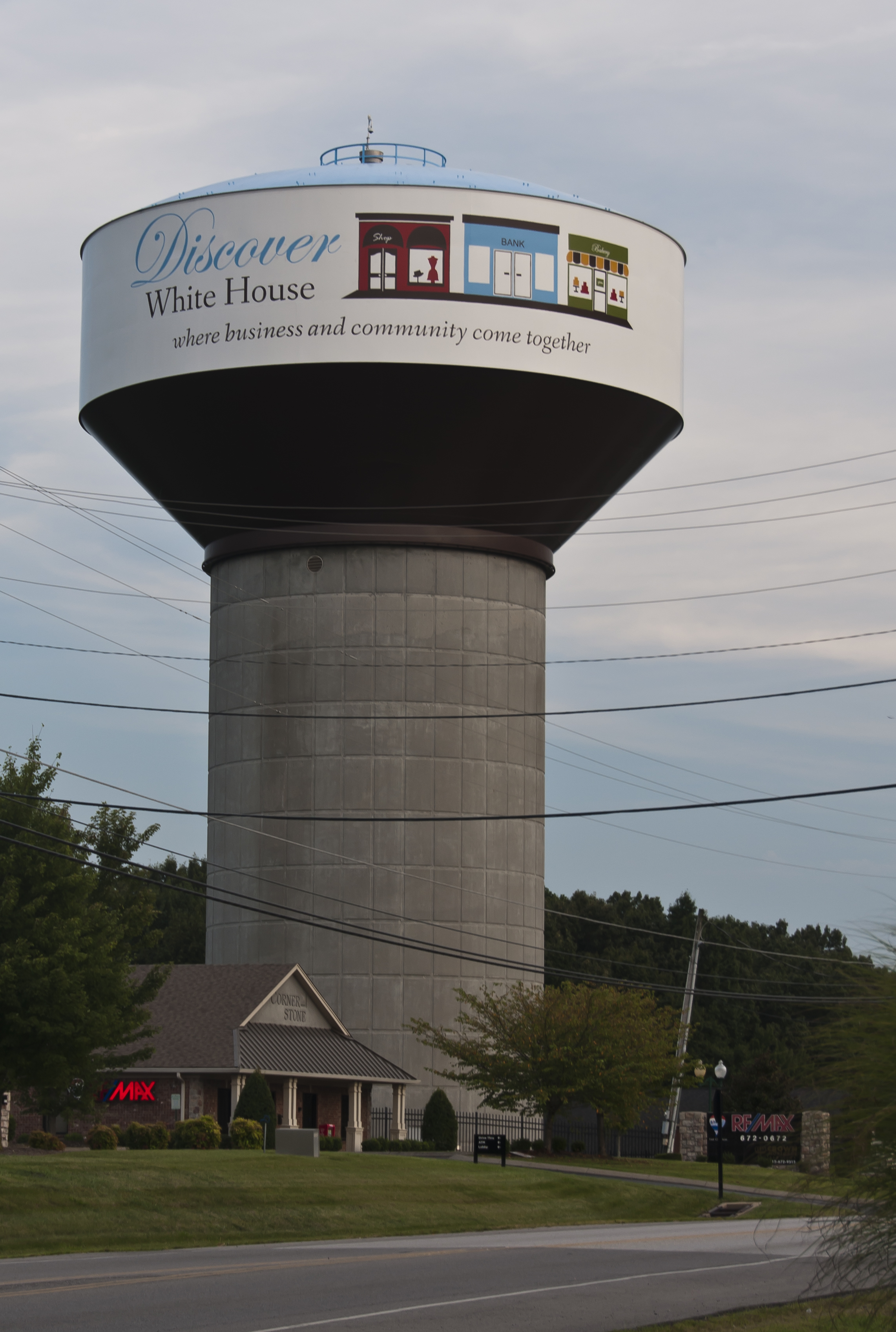
White House Utilities District, Water Tower

White House was incorporated under the Mayor and Aldermanic charter in 1971. The town's current mayor is John Corbitt.

== Education ==
=== Public schools ===
The city is split into two counties, and therefore has two public school districts. Sumner County public schools:

- Harold B. Williams Elementary School (K-2)
- White House Intermediate School (3-5)
- White House Middle School (6-8)
- White House High School (9–12)

Robertson County public schools:

- Robert F. Woodall Elementary School (K-2)
- White House Heritage Elementary School (3–6)
- White House Heritage High School (7–12)

=== Private schools ===
- Christian Community Schools (CCS)
- Dayspring Academy (DSA)
