= Portland, Tennessee =

- City
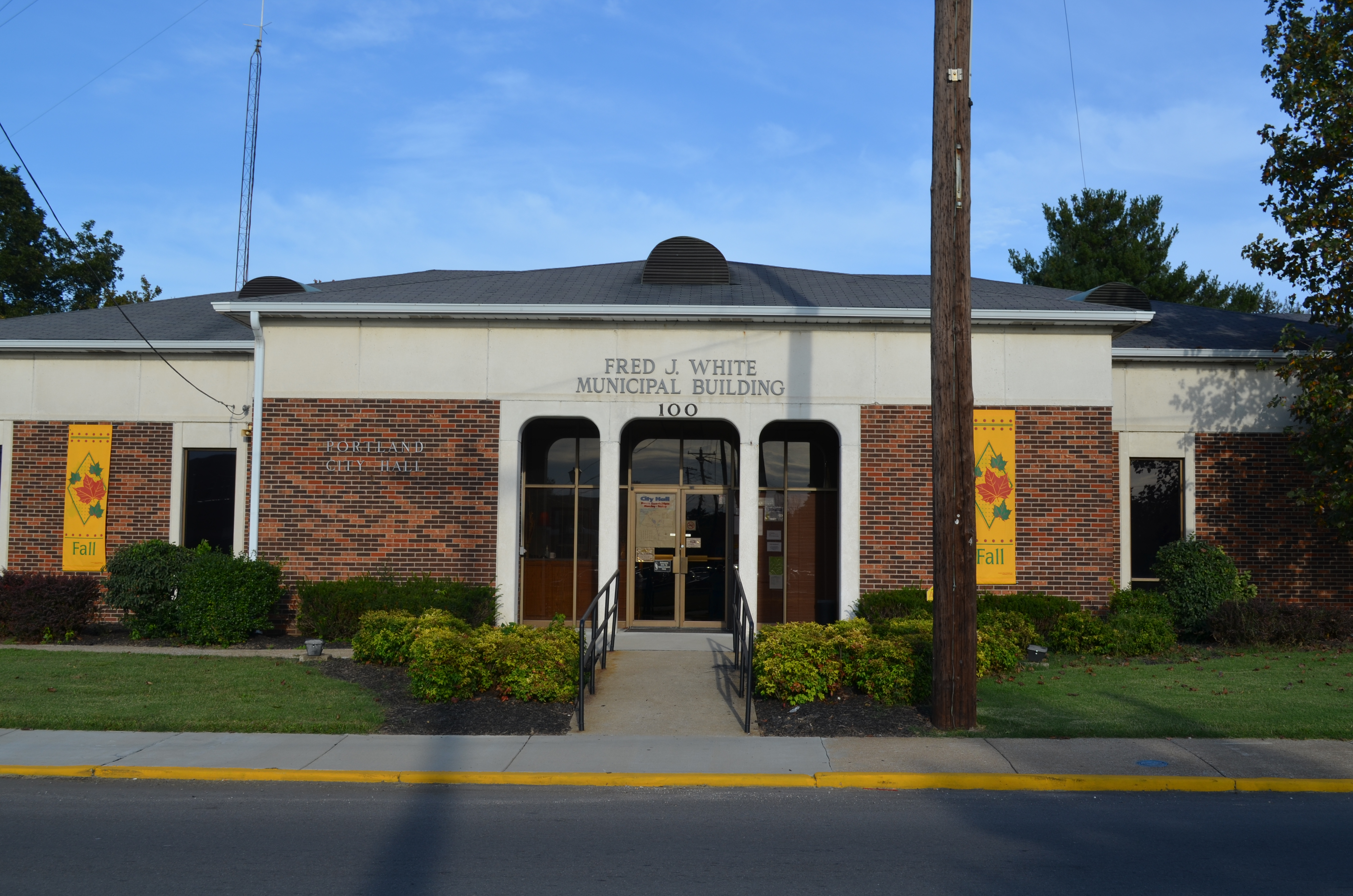
- Portland City Hall

- Flag Logo

- Location of Portland in Sumner County, Tennessee
- Coordinates: 36°34′54″N 86°30′59″W
- Country: United States
- State: Tennessee
- Counties: Sumner, Robertson
- Established: 1859
- Incorporated: 1905

Government
  - Mayor: Mike Callis

Area
  - Total: 14.82 sq mi (38.39 km^{2})
  - Land: 14.80 sq mi (38.34 km^{2})
  - Water: 0.019 sq mi (0.05 km^{2})
- Elevation: 801 ft (244 m)

Population (2020)
  - Total: 13,156
  - Density: 888.7/sq mi (343.14/km^{2})
- Time zone: UTC-6 (Central (CST))
  - Summer (DST): UTC-5 (CDT)
- ZIP code: 37148
- Area codes: 615/629
- FIPS code: 47-60280
- GNIS feature ID: 1298281
- Website: www.cityofportlandtn.gov

Portland is a city in Sumner and Robertson counties in Tennessee. The population was 11,486 in 2010 according to estimates by the U.S. census bureau and in 2020 the population was 13,156. Portland is a part of the Nashville Metropolitan Statistical Area.

== History ==
Portland is located on the Highland Rim in extreme northern Middle Tennessee. This region has always been known for excellent agricultural soils, a spectacular wildlife environment and an enjoyable climate.

People were originally attracted from the tobacco belt in Virginia and the Carolinas to the Highland Rim for land speculation and production of dark tobacco. The Highland Rim offered ideal climate and soil conditions for growing dark tobacco. This lucrative crop increased the value of the land, which benefited land speculators in the area. Eventually these speculators moved on to attempt profits elsewhere. The farmers, however, remained.

The oldest local settlement in Portland is Fountain Head, which is located a couple of miles south of Portland. This settlement was founded in 1792 by the James Gwin family. Within a century, it grew to include a mill, tobacco factory, post office, a Louisville and Nashville Railroad depot, and a number of local retail stores.

William Nolan built a school near Shun Pike in what is now Portland. This stimulated community growth. Portland was originally called Richland. In 1859, the L&N Railroad opened the Nashville-Bowling Green route through Portland. In the same year, a train depot was built in Richland along the railroad on property owned by Thomas Buntin. Buntin was appointed as the depot's first agent and later became Richland's first postmaster. The depot stimulated development in the village. Even today, the railroad runs directly through the center of town.

The first public high school in Sumner County was originally started as a seminary in 1874. It was later named Sumner County High School and opened in 1915.

In 1887, there were two towns in Tennessee named Richland. Officials of the L&N railroad were worried that a telegraph mix-up might result in a train wreck. Postal customers complained of inconvenience as mail was frequently misdirected between the two Richlands. The Railroad administrators and postal authorities decided that Richland in Sumner County would be renamed as Portland to avoid this confusion. The new name was effective on April 10, 1888. Portland was incorporated in April 1904 by legislation passed by the Tennessee Assembly.

In the second decade of the 21st century, Portland is growing at a fast pace buoyed by the growth of the Nashville Metropolitan Area. Daido America operates its US headquarters in Portland. Companies such as Kyowa America and Unipres have manufacturing plants in the city as well.

== Geography ==
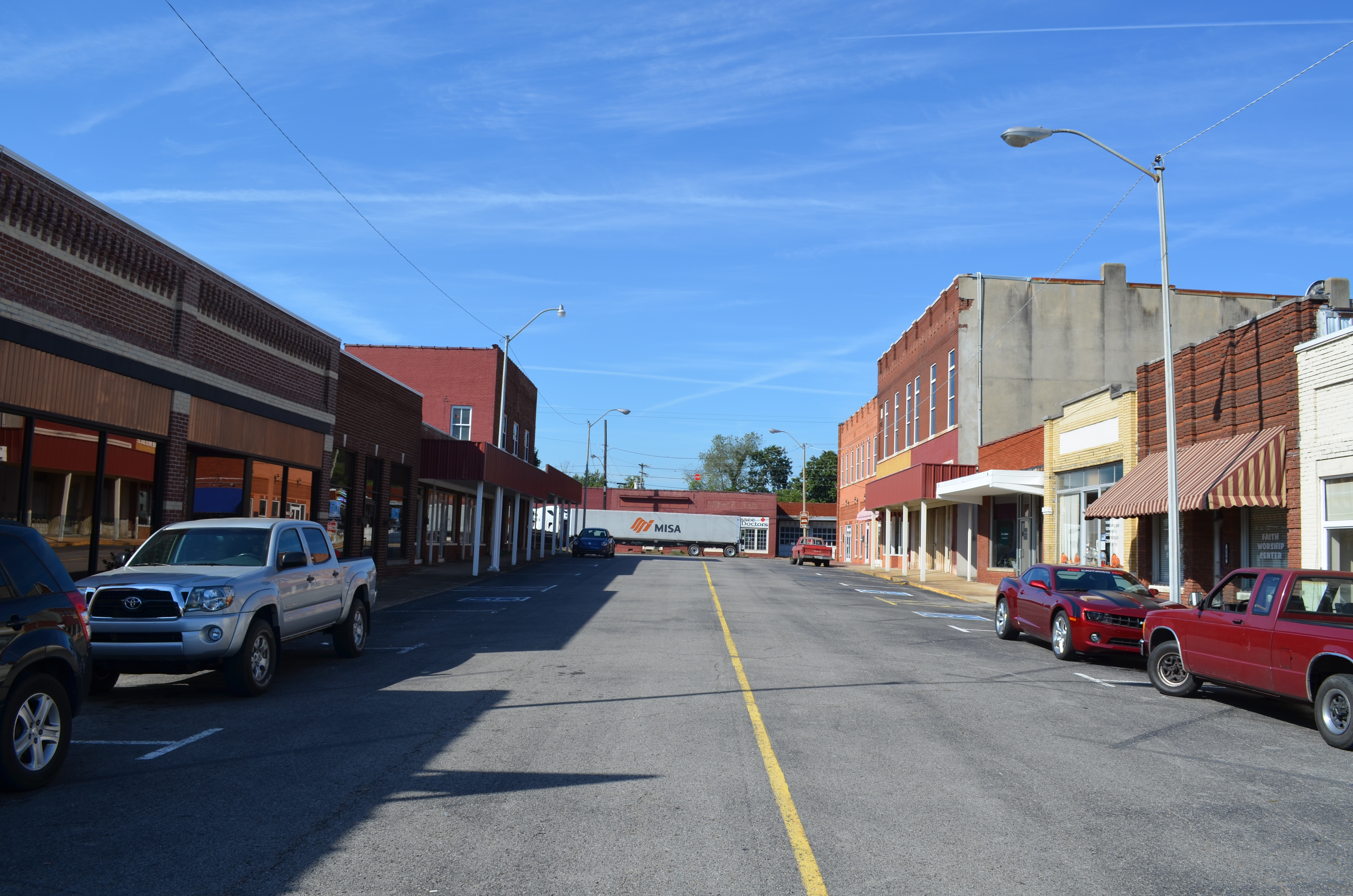
Portland, Tennessee Business District

According to the United States Census Bureau, the city has a total area of 11.4 square miles (30 km^{2}), of which, 11.4 square miles (30 km^{2}) is land and 0.09% is water.

Portland is the northern terminus of U.S. Bicycle Route 23. Portland is considered the strawberry capital of Tennessee.

=== Climate ===
Climate data for Portland Sewage Plant, Tennessee (1991–2020 normals, extremes 1955–present)
Month	Jan	Feb	Mar	Apr	May	Jun	Jul	Aug	Sep	Oct	Nov	Dec	Year
Record high °F (°C)	72 (22)	81 (27)	85 (29)	89 (32)	94 (34)	106 (41)	105 (41)	105 (41)	100 (38)	95 (35)	86 (30)	76 (24)	106 (41)
Mean daily maximum °F (°C)	45.3 (7.4)	50.3 (10.2)	59.1 (15.1)	69.8 (21.0)	77.7 (25.4)	85.3 (29.6)	88.8 (31.6)	88.1 (31.2)	82.2 (27.9)	71.4 (21.9)	58.9 (14.9)	48.9 (9.4)	68.8 (20.4)
Daily mean °F (°C)	36.0 (2.2)	39.9 (4.4)	48.1 (8.9)	58.2 (14.6)	67.2 (19.6)	75.1 (23.9)	78.6 (25.9)	77.5 (25.3)	70.9 (21.6)	59.7 (15.4)	48.2 (9.0)	39.6 (4.2)	58.3 (14.6)
Mean daily minimum °F (°C)	26.6 (−3.0)	29.5 (−1.4)	37.0 (2.8)	46.5 (8.1)	56.6 (13.7)	64.8 (18.2)	68.5 (20.3)	66.9 (19.4)	59.6 (15.3)	47.9 (8.8)	37.4 (3.0)	30.2 (−1.0)	47.6 (8.7)
Record low °F (°C)	−19 (−28)	−9 (−23)	−1 (−18)	21 (−6)	29 (−2)	36 (2)	48 (9)	44 (7)	32 (0)	22 (−6)	9 (−13)	−14 (−26)	−19 (−28)
Average precipitation inches (mm)	4.20 (107)	4.69 (119)	5.08 (129)	5.24 (133)	5.80 (147)	4.36 (111)	4.57 (116)	4.15 (105)	3.64 (92)	3.69 (94)	3.78 (96)	5.11 (130)	54.31 (1,379)
Average snowfall inches (cm)	0.2 (0.51)	1.5 (3.8)	0.3 (0.76)	0.0 (0.0)	0.0 (0.0)	0.0 (0.0)	0.0 (0.0)	0.0 (0.0)	0.0 (0.0)	0.0 (0.0)	0.0 (0.0)	0.0 (0.0)	2.0 (5.1)
Average precipitation days (≥ 0.01 in)	10.9	9.9	12.4	10.9	11.0	10.3	9.7	7.9	7.8	8.0	8.8	11.3	118.9
Average snowy days (≥ 0.1 in)	0.5	0.9	0.2	0.0	0.0	0.0	0.0	0.0	0.0	0.0	0.1	0.2	1.9
Source: NOAA

== Demographics ==
Historical population
Census	Pop.	Note	%±
1910	579		—
1920	869		50.1%
1930	1,030		18.5%
1940	1,212		17.7%
1950	1,660		37.0%
1960	2,424		46.0%
1970	2,872		18.5%
1980	4,030		40.3%
1990	5,165		28.2%
2000	8,458		63.8%
2010	11,480		35.7%
2020	13,156		14.6%
2025 (est.)	13,658	▲	3.8%

=== 2020 census ===
As of the 2020 census, Portland had a population of 13,156. There were 4,823 households, including 3,247 families, residing in the city.

The median age was 35.3 years. 26.9% of residents were under the age of 18 and 13.0% were 65 years of age or older. For every 100 females there were 95.1 males, and for every 100 females age 18 and over there were 91.7 males.

There were 4,823 households in Portland, of which 38.8% had children under the age of 18 living in them. Of all households, 49.8% were married-couple households, 15.8% were households with a male householder and no spouse or partner present, and 25.8% were households with a female householder and no spouse or partner present. About 21.6% of all households were made up of individuals and 8.6% had someone living alone who was 65 years of age or older.

There were 5,084 housing units, of which 5.1% were vacant. The homeowner vacancy rate was 1.7% and the rental vacancy rate was 5.2%.

91.6% of residents lived in urban areas, while 8.4% lived in rural areas.

Racial composition as of the 2020 census
Race	Number	Percent
White	11,051	84.0%
Black or African American	608	4.6%
American Indian and Alaska Native	55	0.4%
Asian	72	0.5%
Native Hawaiian and Other Pacific Islander	2	0.0%
Some other race	389	3.0%
Two or more races	979	7.4%
Hispanic or Latino (of any race)	955	7.3%

=== 2010 Census data ===
As of the 2010 Census Portland had a population of 11,480. It had a racial and ethnic composition of 90.5% non-Hispanic white, 3.5% black or African American, 0.3% Native American, 0.5% Asian, 0.1% Pacific Islander, 0.1% non-Hispanic from some other race, 1.7% two or more races, and 3.9% Hispanic or Latino.

=== 2000 Census data ===
At the 2000 census there were 8,458 people in 3,226 households, including 2,377 families, in the city. The population density was 739.7 inhabitants per square mile (285.6/km^{2}). There were 3,502 housing units at an average density of 306.3 units per square mile (118.3 units/km^{2}). The racial makeup of the city was 94.53% White, 2.70% African American, 0.33% Native American, 0.19% Asian, 1.40% from other races, and 0.86% from two or more races. Hispanic or Latino of any race were 2.29%.

Of the 3,226 households 38.7% had children under the age of 18 living with them, 57.1% were married couples living together, 12.6% had a female householder with no husband present, and 26.3% were non-families. 21.8% of households were one person and 9.9% were one person aged 65 or older. The average household size was 2.62 and the average family size was 3.03.

In the city, the population was 28.1% under the age of 18, 10.6% from 18 to 24, 31.6% from 25 to 44, 18.6% from 45 to 64, and 11.1% 65 or older. The median age was 31 years. For every 100 females, there were 93.4 males. For every 100 females age 18 and over, there were 90.1 males. The median household income was $35,644 and the median family income was $40,786. Males had a median income of $30,550 versus $21,875 for females. The per capita income for the city was $15,559. About 6.7% of families and 10.5% of the population were below the poverty line, including 13.7% of those under age 18 and 14.1% of those age 65 or over.

== Notable people ==
- Corey Brewer, born and raised in Portland; former NBA basketball player
- Ronnie McDowell, born and raised in Portland, country music star
- Steve-O, Jackass stunt performer, & owns a ranch just outside city limits
- Jackson McLerran, born, raised, and resides in Portland; professional stock car racing driver

== Nearby communities ==
- Nashville
- Hendersonville
- Gallatin
- White House
- Mt. Juliet
- Clarksville
- Westmoreland
- Orlinda
- Mitchellville
- Franklin
- Fairfield
- Oak Grove
- Bethpage
- Cross Plains
