= Tennessee State Route 6 =

State highway in Tennessee, United States

State Route 6

Route information
- Maintained by TDOT
- Existed: October 1, 1923–present

Location
- Country: United States
- State: Tennessee

Highway system
- Tennessee State Routes; Interstate; US; State
← SR 5	→ SR 7

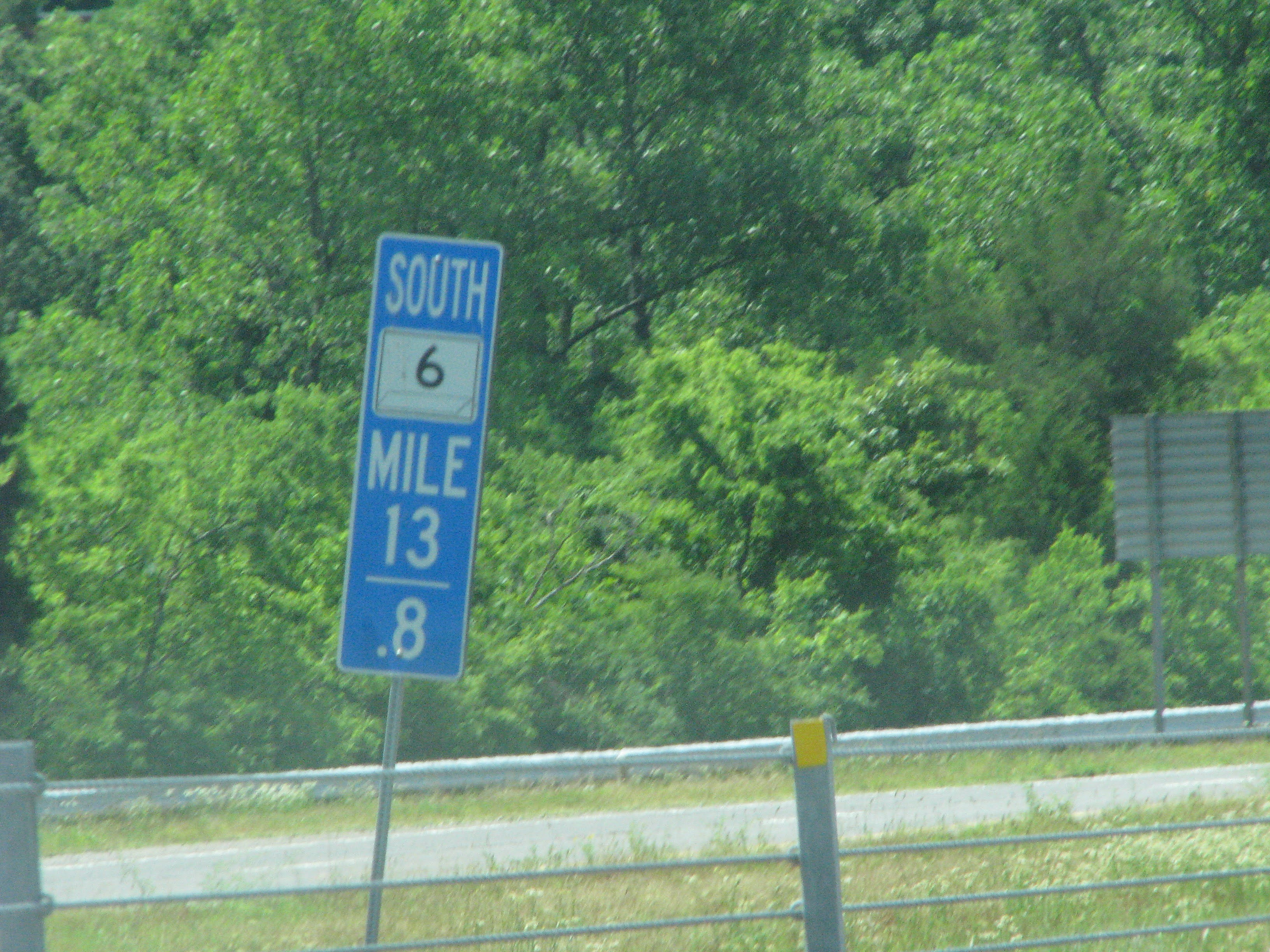
State Route 6 co-signed with U.S. Route 31E (Ellington Parkway) in Nashville, Tennessee

State Route 6 (SR 6) is a state highway that is unsigned. It travels through the central part of the U.S. state of Tennessee from Lawrence County to Sumner County. The highway is a companion route to the following U.S. Highways:

- U.S. Route 43 (US 43) from the Alabama state line to Columbia
- US 31 from Columbia to Nashville
- US 31E from Nashville to the Kentucky state line

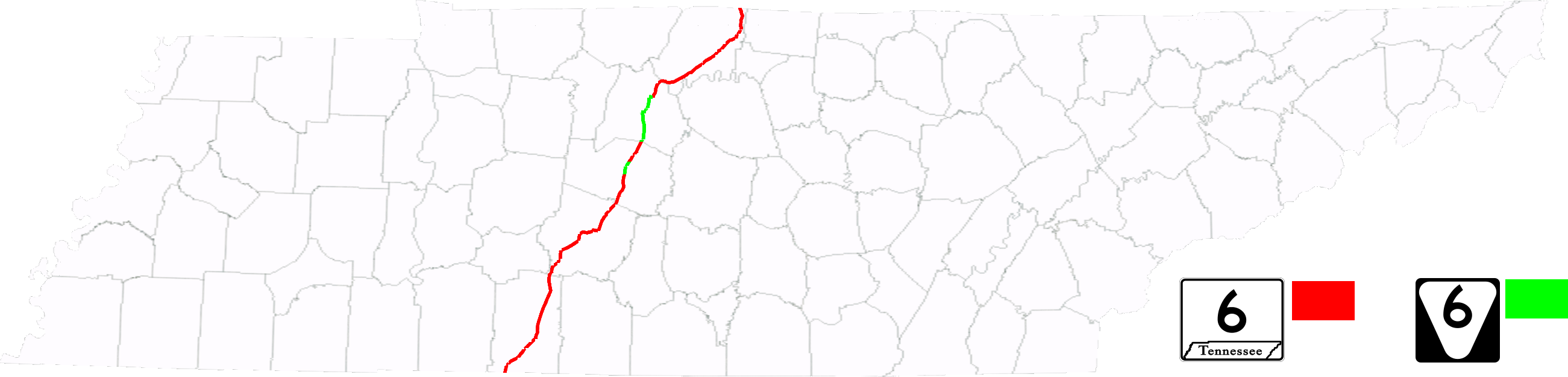
State Route 6 outlined

== TDOT designations ==
Most of SR 6 is a primary highway; however, between SR 397 in Franklin and SR 254 right past the Davidson County line to SR 155 are all the areas where SR 6 is secondary. There is ambiguity between the two Davidson County Functional Classification Maps (19b & 19a) and the TDOT Traffic Map information is not consistent designations of the Primary and Secondary route in Davidson County.
