= Kentucky Route 1297 =

State highway in Kentucky, United States

Kentucky Route 1297
- KY 1297 highlighted in red

Route information
- Maintained by KYTC
- Length: 22.063 mi (35.507 km)

Major junctions
- West end: KY 1402 east of Bowling Green
- KY 101 near Kepler; KY 255 in rural western Barren Co.
- East end: US 31E in Glasgow

Location
- Country: United States
- State: Kentucky
- Counties: Barren, Warren

Highway system
- Kentucky State Highway System; Interstate; US; State; Parkways
← KY 1296	→ KY 1298

Kentucky Route 1297 (KY 1297) is a 22.063-mile-long (35.507 km) east–west state highway that traverses two counties in south-central Kentucky.

== Route description ==
KY 1297 is one out of two old, original routes from Bowling Green directly to Glasgow, the other being the current U.S. Route 68 (US 68) and KY 80 alignment east of Bowling Green.

KY 1297 starts at an intersection with KY 1402 in the Gotts community. The road in its entire route from KY 1402 to the Barren County line is known as Gott–Hydro Road. KY 1297's first major intersection is a crossroad intersection with KY 101 between Smiths Grove and Meador. This is in the unincorporated community of Kepler. KY 1297 mainly runs through rural areas of east-central Warren County, and then enters Barren County, where it is known as Old Bowling Green Road. KY 1297's first major intersection in Barren County is a crossroads intersection with KY 255, a road that goes from Mammoth Cave National Park to the north side of the Barren River Lake area. KY 1297 goes through more farmland areas in western Barren County. KY 1297 then meets the western terminus of Veterans Outer Loop (KY 3600), and goes under an overpass carrying the Cumberland Expressway. KY 1297 reaches its end with an intersection with US 31E (L. Roger Wells Boulevard) on the southwestern side of Glasgow.

== History ==
In June 2014, KY 1297 gained a new intersection with a new extension of the Veterans Outer Loop just west of the Glasgow city limits. The new extension of the Veterans Outer Loop includes an at-grade intersection with KY 1297. The state highway designation for the new section of the Veterans Outer Loop is Kentucky Route 3600.

== Major intersections ==
County	Location	mi	km	Destinations	Notes
Warren		0.000	0.000	KY 1402 (Porter Pike)	Western terminus
Warren	Kepler	6.345	10.211	KY 101 (Smiths Grove-Scottsville Road) to I-65	
Barren	Railton	11.021	17.737	KY 2240 north (Merry Oaks-Railton Road)	Southern terminus of KY-2240
Barren		14.115	22.716	KY 255 (Bon Ayr Road) – Barren River Lake State Resort Park	
Barren	Beckton	15.864	25.531	KY 685 north (Beckton Road)	Southern terminus of KY 685
Barren	Glasgow	18.945	30.489	KY 3600 east (Veterans Outer Loop) to Cumberland Expressway / US 68 / KY 90 – Glasgow, Cave City	Western terminus of KY 3600
Barren	Glasgow	22.070	35.518	US 31E (L. Roger Wells Blvd.)	Eastern terminus; road continues straight ahead as Cleveland Ave.
1.000 mi = 1.609 km; 1.000 km = 0.621 mi
