= Kentucky Route 101 =

State highway in Kentucky, United States

Kentucky Route 101
- KY 101 highlighted in red

Route information
- Maintained by KYTC
- Length: 30.958 mi (49.822 km)

Major junctions
- South end: KY 100 in Scottsville
- US 31E in Scottsville; US 68 / KY 80 near Smiths Grove; I-65 in Smiths Grove; US 31W near Smiths Grove
- North end: KY 259 at Rhoda

Location
- Country: United States
- State: Kentucky
- Counties: Allen, Warren, Edmonson

Highway system
- Kentucky State Highway System; Interstate; US; State; Parkways
← KY 100	→ KY 102

Kentucky Route 101 (KY 101) is a north–south highway traversing three counties in south central Kentucky.

== Route description ==
KY 101 extends through three geophysical subregions of the Interior Low Plateaus, which stretch from Tennessee to north of the Ohio River. These three regions roughly correspond with the three counties the highway traverses. KY 101 in Allen County passes through the Eastern Highland Rim, a northward extension of Middle Tennessee's Highland Rim that features undulating plains, hills, and karst. In Warren County, the highway crosses the Western Pennyroyal Karst Plain, a valley that features innumerable ponds and sinkholes. KY 101's Edmonson County stretch is through the Mammoth Cave Uplands, a rugged plateau that includes much of the namesake national park. All three subregions feature a mix of forest and farmland, which the latter prevalent along the route's Warren County course. At the county lines and geophysical subregion boundaries are two significant obstacles, the Barren River at the Allen-Warren county line and a cuesta called The Knobs at the Warren-Edmonson county line. KY 101 is part of the state primary system from the western junction with US 31W north to its northern terminus. The remainder of KY 101 is part of the state secondary system.

=== Scottsville to Smiths Grove ===
KY 101 begins at KY 100 in Scottsville's courthouse square within the Scottsville Downtown Commercial Historic District. KY 100 heads east along Main Street and south on Court Street. KY 101 heads north from downtown along Court Street. North of Plum Street on the northern edge of the street grid, the highway's name becomes Smiths Grove Road. KY 101 leaves the city of Scottsville immediately before its intersection with US 31E (New Glasgow Road), which bypasses the city to the west and north. North of the U.S. Highway, the route meets the eastern end of KY 1332 (Halifax Road) and crosses Bays Fork and the North Prong of Bays Fork. KY 101 meets the east end of KY 234 (Cemetery Road) as it passes to the west of Gainesville. The highway intersects KY 1533 (Meadow-Port Oliver Road) at Meador before the route crosses the Barren River into Warren County.

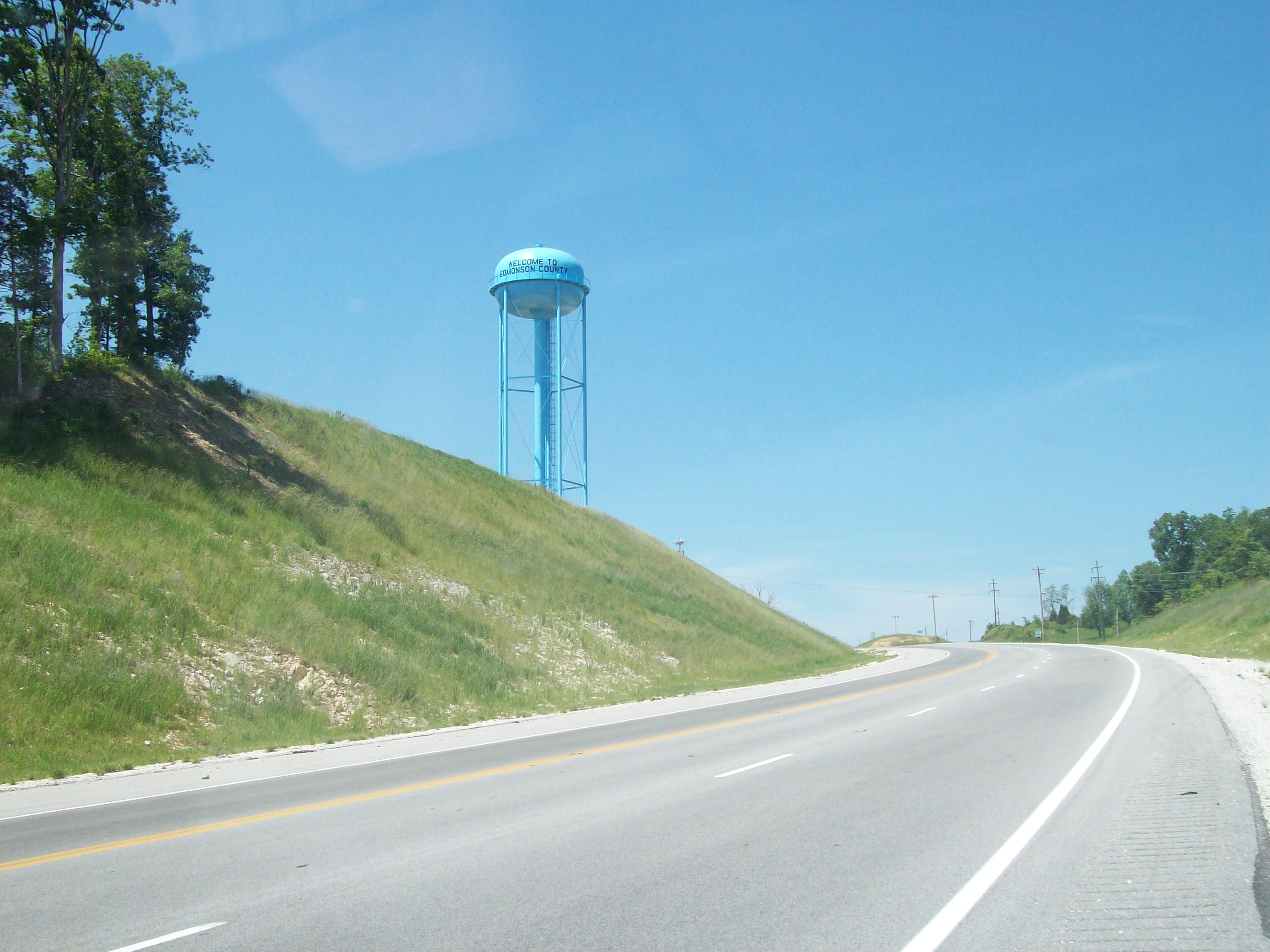
KY 101 northbound on the border of Warren and Edmonson counties

KY 101 continues as Smiths Grove-Scottsville Road, which passes to the northeast of Martinsville and meets the east end of KY 1402 (Porter Pike) at Three Forks. The highway intersects KY 1297 (Gotts Hydro Road) at Kepler. KY 101 intersects US 68 and KY 80, which run concurrently on Glasgow Road, south of KY 101's diamond interchange with I-65 (Abraham Lincoln Memorial Highway) at the southern edge of the city of Smiths Grove. The portion of KY 101 between US 68 and I-65 is the most heavily traveled portion of KY 101; as of 2015, this segment's annual average daily traffic is more than three times that of the portion of the highway between KY 1297 and US 68. Since I-65's interchange with US 68 is partial, traffic from southbound I-65 to westbound US 68 and from eastbound US 68 to northbound I-65 must use KY 101 to connect.

=== Smiths Grove to Rhoda ===
KY 101 follows Main Street through the city, in the center of which the highway intersects CSX's Main Line Subdivision rail line. KY 101 continues through the Smiths Grove Historic District. The highway passes a block to the east of the J.L. Wright House and a block to the west of Smiths Grove Presbyterian Church. KY 101 passes the Smiths Grove Baptist Church one block south of where the route turns west onto 6th Street for two blocks. At the west city limit of Smiths Grove, the highway turns north and leaves the city along Smiths Grove-Scottsville Road. KY 101 passes through a pair of more-than-right-angle curves to the west and then north before reaching US 31W (Louisville Road), which the state-numbered highway joins heading west.

KY 101 splits from US 31W onto Chalybeate Road, which heads north and then northeast as the route ascends The Knobs onto a plateau. Near the top of the climb, on which northbound KY 101 gains a climbing lane, the highway enters Edmonson County. The route intersects KY 743 (New Grove Road) and then runs concurrently with the highway to Chalybeate, where KY 743 splits west onto Chalybeate School Road. KY 101 meets the north end of KY 3611 (Chalybeate Road) next to the site of the Chalybeate Springs Hotel Springhouse. The highway intersects the south end of KY 3019 (Chalybeate Road) south of Rhoda and continues along Veterans Memorial Highway, which crosses Beaverdam Creek, a tributary of the Green River. On the east side of Rhoda, KY 101 reaches its northern terminus at KY 259, which heads east along Brownsville Road and north along a continuation of Veterans Memorial Highway toward Brownsville.

== History ==
In 2001, the final stretch of KY 101 between Chalybeate and Rhoda, along with KY 259 from Rhoda to Brownsville was re-routed onto a straighter alignment that is also known as the Veterans Memorial Highway. After the reconstruction project was completed in 2002, the original alignment of KY 101 between the northern end of Chalybeate to its original northern terminus in Rhoda was re-designated as KY 3019 per an official order issued on September 23, 2002.

In mid-to-late 2010, KY 101 in the Chalybeate area was reconstructed, and was realigned to bypass the town. The old alignment in that area was redesignated as KY 3611, which became the shortest signed state route in Edmonson County once the designation was assigned per an official order issued on August 8, 2011.

== Major intersections ==
County	Location	mi	km	Destinations	Notes
Allen	Scottsville	0.000	0.000	KY 100 (South Court Street / East Main Street)	Southern terminus of KY 101 on
Allen		1.200	1.931	US 31E (New Glasgow Road) – Glasgow, Gallatin, TN	
Allen		1.412	2.272	KY 1332 west (Halifax Road)	
Allen		5.861	9.432	KY 234 west (Cemetery Road)	Eastern terminus of KY 234
Allen	Meador	10.028	16.139	KY 1533 (Meador–Port Oliver Road) – Barren River Lake	
Warren	Three Forks	14.438	23.236	KY 1402 west (Porter Pike)	Eastern terminus of KY 1402
Warren	Kepler	16.429	26.440	KY 1297 (Gotts Hydro Road)	
Warren		20.624	33.191	US 68 / KY 80 (Glasgow Road) – Glasgow, Oakland	
Warren	Smiths Grove	21.210	34.134	I-65 (Abraham Lincoln Memorial Highway) – Nashville, Louisville	I-65 exit 38
Warren		24.988	40.214	US 31W north (Louisville Road) – Park City	Southern end of US 31W concurrency
Warren		25.674	41.318	US 31W south (Louisville Road) – Bowling Green	Northern end of US 31W concurrency
Edmonson		27.718	44.608	KY 743 north (New Grove Road)	Southern end of KY 743 overlap
Edmonson	Chalybeate	28.278	45.509	KY 743 south (Chalybeate School Road)	Northern end of KY 743 overlap
Edmonson	Chalybeate	28.742	46.256	KY 3611 south (Chalybeate Road)	Northern terminus of KY 3611
Edmonson		29.775	47.918	KY 3019 north (Chalybeate Road)	Southern terminus of KY 3019
Edmonson	Rhoda	30.958	49.822	KY 259 (Brownsville Road) – Brownsville, Rocky Hill, Nolin Lake State Park	Northern terminus of KY 101
1.000 mi = 1.609 km; 1.000 km = 0.621 mi: Concurrency terminus
