= Gainesville =

Gainesville may refer to:

- Gainesville, Alabama
- Gainesville, Arkansas
- Gainesville, Florida
- Gainesville, Georgia
- Gainesville, Kentucky
- Gainesville, Mississippi
- Gainesville, Missouri
- Gainesville, New York
  - Gainesville (village), New York, a village within the town of Gainesville
- Gainesville, Texas
- Gainesville, Virginia

== See also ==
- Gainesville station
