= Sidville, Kentucky =

Unincorporated community in Kentucky, United States

- Unincorporated community
- Location within Kentucky
- Coordinates: 38°7′41″N 84°15′35″W
- Country: United States
- State: Kentucky
- County: Bourbon
- Elevation: 1,004 ft (306 m)
- Time zone: UTC-5 (Eastern (EST))
  - Summer (DST): UTC-4 (EDT)
- GNIS feature ID: 509057

Sidville is an unincorporated community in Bourbon County, Kentucky, United States.
