= Smiths Grove Baptist Church =

Historic church in Kentucky, United States

- U.S. National Register of Historic Places
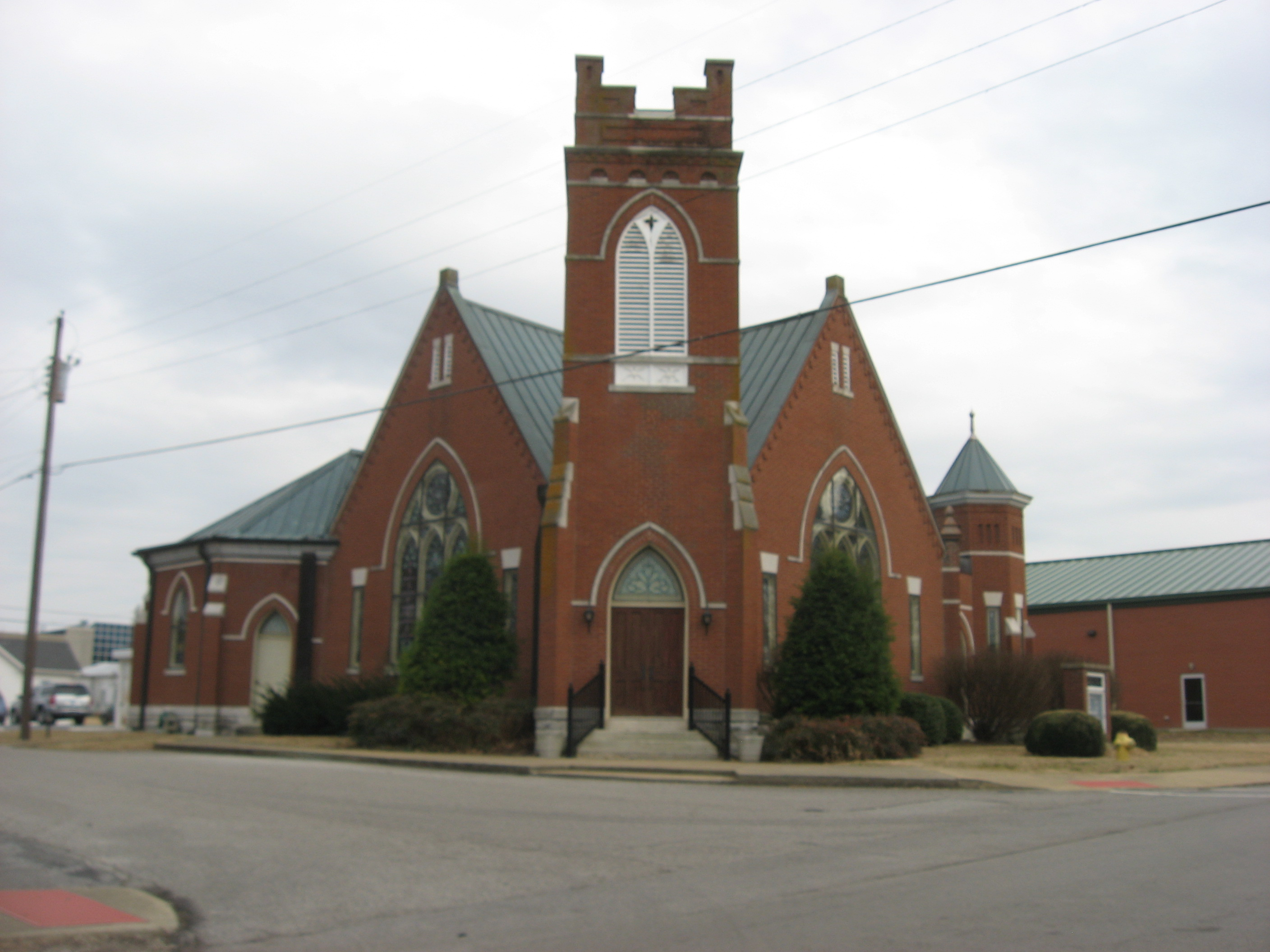
- Front along Main Street

- Location within Kentucky Location within the United States
- Location: Main and 5th Sts., Smiths Grove, Kentucky 42171
- Coordinates: 37°3′24″N 86°12′27″W
- Area: less than one acre
- Built: 1898
- Architectural style: Gothic Revival
- MPS: Warren County MRA
- NRHP reference No.: 79003538
- Added to NRHP: December 18, 1979

Smiths Grove Baptist Church is a historic church at Main and 5th Streets in Smiths Grove, Kentucky. It was built in 1898 and added to the National Register of Historic Places in 1979.

It is a cruciform-plan one-and-a-half-story brick church. "In his arresting composition the designer-builder showed an awareness of the picturesque and even startling effects possible in Gothic styling."
