= Gainesville metropolitan area =

The Gainesville metropolitan area may refer to:

- The Gainesville, Florida metropolitan area, United States
- The Gainesville, Georgia metropolitan area, United States
- The Gainesville, Texas micropolitan area, United States

== See also ==
- Gainesville (disambiguation)
