= Kentucky Route 3160 =

State highway in Kentucky, United States

Kentucky Route 3160

Route information
- Maintained by KYTC
- Length: 3.212 mi (5.169 km)
- Existed: 2004–2012

Major junctions
- West end: US 68 / KY 80
- KY 90
- North end: US 31E

Location
- Country: United States
- State: Kentucky
- Counties: Barren

Highway system
- Kentucky State Highway System; Interstate; US; State; Parkways
← KY 3159	→ KY 3161

Kentucky Route 3160 (KY 3160) was a 3.212-mile-long (5.169 km) four-lane divided east–west state highway located entirely in Barren County in the south-central part of the U.S. state of Kentucky.

== Route description ==
KY 3160 was the first section of the Veterans Outer Loop to be built in the early 2000s. It originated on the west side of Glasgow at an intersection running concurrently with U.S. Route 68 (US 68) and KY 80, and ended at an intersection with US 31E on the north side of town.

== History ==
The KY 3160 designation was first assigned to a secondary route in Hardin County. It traveled along Logsdon Parkway from KY 1500 to KY 313 in Radcliff. That was re-designated as part of KY 1646 on February 1, 1988, when the old route of KY 1646 along Shelton Road was given to the city of Radcliff.

In the early 2000s, the construction of the Veterans Outer Loop near Glasgow, in Barren County, began with a stretch of road connecting with US 68 on the west side of Glasgow to US 31E on the north side. It was completed in 2004, and it was designated as KY 3160.

In the 2010/11 fiscal year, the Veterans Outer Loop was extended eastward to make a complete bypass around the city. When it was completed in 2012, US 68 was re-routed onto the Veterans Outer Loop, while the existing US 68 alignment was re-designated as US 68 Business. Therefore, the designation of KY 3160 was decommissioned by the KTC for a second time.

== Major intersections ==
The entire route is in Glasgow, Barren County.

mi	km	Destinations	Notes
0.000	0.000	US 68 west (Bowling Green Road) / KY 80 (Veterans Outer Loop) / US 68 Bus. east (West Main Street)	
1.277	2.055	KY 90 (Happy Valley Road) to I-65 – Cave City, Mammoth Cave National Park, Glasgow	
3.212	5.169	US 31E (Jackson Highway)	
1.000 mi = 1.609 km; 1.000 km = 0.621 mi
