= Kentucky Route 1402 =

State highway in Kentucky, United States

Kentucky Route 1402
- KY 1402 highlighted in red

Route information
- Maintained by KYTC
- Length: 11.903 mi (19.156 km)

Major junctions
- West end: US 31W / US 68 / KY 80 in Bowling Green
- KY 1297 at Gott.
- East end: KY 101 in eastern Warren County.

Location
- Country: United States
- State: Kentucky
- Counties: Warren

Highway system
- Kentucky State Highway System; Interstate; US; State; Parkways
← KY 1401	→ KY 1403

Kentucky Route 1402 is a state highway that runs through a portion of eastern Warren County in south-central Kentucky. The road is known locally as Porter Pike.

== Route description ==
The route begins in Bowling Green at a junction with multiple cojoined routes, known locally as Louisville Road. KY 1402 then proceeds east through an area dotted by small businesses and new residential development for 1.2 miles (1.9 km) before crossing under I-65 by way of an underpass.

Past this point, KY 1402 runs through an area lined largely by large rural estates and ranches. It continues east for another 4.6 miles (7.4 km) before coming to a junction with KY 1297 in the Gotts community.

The route then continues to the east for another 6.2 miles (10.0 km) before reaching its eastern terminus at a junction with KY 101 near the Allen County line.

== Major intersections ==
The entire route is in Warren County.

Location	mi	km	Destinations	Notes
Plum Springs	0.000	0.000	US 31W / US 68 / KY 80	
Gott	5.701	9.175	KY 1297	
Three Forks	11.903	19.156	KY 101	
1.000 mi = 1.609 km; 1.000 km = 0.621 mi
