= Veterans Outer Loop =

Beltway around Glasgow, Kentucky, United States

Route information
- Length: 9.301 mi (14.969 km)
- Component highways: US 68; KY 3600; KY 1519

Major junctions
- West end: KY 1297
- Cumberland Expressway; US 68 / KY 80 / US 68 Bus.; Oil City Road; KY 90; US 31E in Glasgow; US 68 Bus. / US 68 / KY 80 in Glasgow; Cumberland Expressway in Glasgow
- East end: KY 1307 in Glasgow

Location
- Country: United States
- State: Kentucky

Highway system
- Kentucky State Highway System; Interstate; US; State; Parkways

Veterans Outer Loop is a major bypass route in Glasgow, Kentucky. It is maintained by the Kentucky Transportation Cabinet (KYTC).

== Route description ==
With a state route designation of Kentucky Route 3600 (KY 3600), the road begins at an intersection with KY 1297 (Old Bowling Green Road) near the exit 8 interchange of the Louie B. Nunn Cumberland Expressway before meeting the concurrently running U.S. Route 68 and KY 80, as well as US 68 Bus. It carries US 68 for its course from West Main Street/Bowling Green Road to the other US 68/US 68 Bus. intersection on the east side of town at Edmonton Road/Columbia Avenue. From there, it carries KY 1519 on the east side of Glasgow over Cumberland Parkway, and it ends at an at-grade intersection with KY 1307.

== History ==
Construction of the outer loop began in the early 2000s, beginning with the section from US 68 (Bowling Green Road) to KY 90 (Happy Valley Road) to US 31E (Jackson Highway) on the west and north sides of Glasgow, which was completed in 2004. This first section was originally designated as KY 3160. During the 2010–11 fiscal year, the road was extended to include another intersection with US 68, a new exit 15 interchange for Cumberland Parkway on the east side of town, ending with an intersection with KY 1307. When that extension was completed in 2012, the KY 3160 designation was decommissioned when US 68 was rerouted onto the Outer Loop, and the original US 68 through Glasgow became US 68 Business.

On May 28, 2015, the Veterans Outer Loop was extended on Glasgow's west side. Construction of the extension began in late 2014. The extension traveled from the original western terminus to an intersection with Old Bowling Green Road (KY 1297). The project also included a new interchange on Cumberland Expressway at mile marker 8.8, just east of Beaver Creek (a tributary of the Barren River), signed as exit 8. Once the new extension had been completed, the KYTC designated the western extension KY 3600.

== Major intersections ==
The entire route is in Glasgow, Barren County.

mi	km	Destinations	Notes
0.000	0.000	KY 1297 (Old Bowling Green Road) – Glasgow, Pondsville	Western terminus and western end of KY 3600 concurrency
0.383	0.616	Cumberland Expressway to I-65 – Bowling Green, Somerset	Louie B. Nunn Cumberland Parkway exit 8
2.501	4.025	US 68 west (Bowling Green Road) / KY 80 (Veterans Outer Loop) / US 68 Bus. east (West Main Street)	Eastern end of KY 3600 concurrency; western end of US 68 concurrency
2.858	4.600	Oil City Road	
3.778	6.080	KY 90 (Happy Valley Road) to I-65 – Cave City, Mammoth Cave National Park, Glasgow	
5.011	8.064	Old Munfordville Road	
5.713	9.194	US 31E (Jackson Highway)	
8.00	12.87	US 68 east / KY 80 east (Edmonton Road) / KY 1519 south (Veterans Outer Loop) / US 68 Bus. west (Columbia Avenue)	Eastern end of US 68 concurrency; northern end of KY 1519 concurrency; northern terminus of KY 1519
9.115	14.669	Cumberland Expressway – Somerset, Bowling Green	Louie B. Nunn Cumberland Parkway exit 15
9.301	14.969	KY 1307 (New Salem Road)	Southern terminus of KY 1519 and eastern terminus of Veterans Outer Loop
1.000 mi = 1.609 km; 1.000 km = 0.621 mi: Concurrency terminus

== Kentucky Route 1519 ==
Kentucky Route 1519
- Location: near Glasgow
- Length: 1.301 mi (2.094 km)

Kentucky Route 1519 (KY 1519) is a state highway in Barren County, Kentucky, that is the final 1.301 miles (2.094 km) of the Veterans Outer Loop. It starts at a junction with KY 1307, intersects the Louie B. Nunn Cumberland Expressway at its exit 15 interchange, and it ends at U.S. Route 68 (US 68) and KY 80 (Edmonton Road) on the east side of Glasgow. The Veterans Outer Loop continues as US 68 westbound.
