= Cumberland Expressway =

Highway in Kentucky, U.S.

Cumberland Parkway
- Louie B. Nunn Cumberland Expressway

Route information
- Maintained by KYTC
- Length: 88.376 mi (142.227 km)
- Existed: 1972–present

Major junctions
- West end: I-65 near Park City
- US 31E in Glasgow; US 68 / KY 80 near Edmonton; US 127 in Russell Springs
- East end: US 27 in Somerset

Location
- Country: United States
- State: Kentucky
- Counties: Barren, Metcalfe, Adair, Russell, Pulaski

Highway system
- Kentucky State Highway System; Interstate; US; State; Parkways

The Louie B. Nunn Cumberland Expressway is a 88.4-mile (142.3 km) freeway in the U.S. state of Kentucky, extending from Barren County in the west to Somerset in the east. It is one of seven named highways designated in Kentucky's parkway system.

== Route description ==
The expressway begins at Interstate 65 (exit 43) interchange between Smiths Grove and Park City. It travels east through rolling farmland to its eastern terminus at US 27 on the north side of Somerset. The road parallels Kentucky Route 80 for its entire length. The expressway passes the cities of Glasgow, Edmonton, Columbia, and Russell Springs. It passes near two popular state parks: Lake Cumberland State Resort Park and Barren River Lake State Resort Park. The length of the expressway is designated unsigned Kentucky Route 9008 (LN 9008).

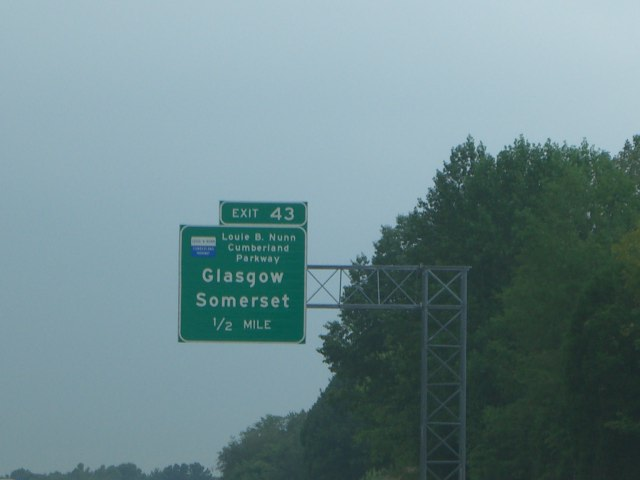
I-65's Cumberland Expressway sign near Rocky Hill, Kentucky.

== History ==
Original Cumberland Parkway shield

The road is named after Louie Nunn, a former Kentucky governor from Barren County, who was instrumental in the road's creation. Originally called the Cumberland Parkway from its opening in 1972–1973, it was renamed for Nunn in 2000.

The Nunn Parkway, as with all nine parkways, was originally a toll road. By Kentucky state law, toll collection ceases when enough toll has been collected or funds received from other sources, such as a legislative appropriation, to pay off the construction bonds for the parkway. In the case of the Nunn, toll booths were removed in 2003 because of a bill in the United States Congress sponsored by Hal Rogers (R-KY), which included an appropriation to pay off the bonds on the parkway, as well as those of the Daniel Boone Parkway in southeastern Kentucky. The state legislature then renamed the Boone Parkway for Rogers, which sparked controversy among residents of the region and the offspring of Boone. Nunn tried to calm the controversy by suggesting the state rename the Nunn Parkway for Rogers instead, restoring the Boone name, saying that the Cumberland Parkway had been named for Nunn without his consent.

=== Toll plazas and prices ===
The parkway had three toll plazas upon opening in 1973. A fourth one opened at the Nancy exit on the eastbound on-ramp and westbound off-ramp when that interchange opened in the 1980s.

| Exit or MM | Location | Through cars charge | Enter east or leave west | Enter west or leave east | Notes |
|---|---|---|---|---|---|
| 3 | near Bon Ayr (Barren County) | 30 cents | N/A | | Toll Plaza office originally located on Oak Grove Church Road off KY 255 |
| 27 | Edmonton | 80 cents | 50 cents | 30 cents | |
| 62 | Russell Springs | 90 cents | 60 cents | 30 cents | |
| 78 | Nancy (Pulaski County) | Free | 20 cents | Free | |

=== 21st century ===
Presumably, the Nunn Parkway was built to Interstate Highway standards at its time of construction aside from some at-grade intersections and traffic signals near its east end, which were eliminated in 2010 by constructing a northwestern bypass around Somerset. The old routing was utilized as part of the construction projected that rerouted both Kentucky Route 80 and Kentucky Route 914. The east end of the expressway is currently a partial cloverleaf at US 27. The bypass was constructed as part of the now-cancelled I-66 proposed extension through Kentucky.

==== Newly added interchanges ====
On May 28, 2015, a new interchange was opened west of Glasgow to serve the western extension of the Veterans Outer Loop. The eastern extension of that road has been opened in early 2012, complete with the opening of exit 15, which serves the eastern extension of Veterans Outer Loop, designated at KY 1519. The state highway designation for the western extension was announced as Kentucky Route 3600. Upon completion of the new western extension of the Veterans Outer Loop, it includes the new on- and off-ramps of the Cumberland Expressway, and a new at-grade intersection with Kentucky Route 1297.

The Glasgow interchange is one of seven new interchanges that have opened along the expressway since 2010. Another interchange is proposed at Kentucky Route 249 as well.

=== Renaming ===
On June 1, 2021, state legislation renamed Cumberland Parkway to an expressway.

== Future ==
Future Interstate 365
- Location: Park City–Somerset
- Length: 88.376 mi (142.227 km)

On August 5, 2021, Congress released a new infrastructure bill that proposed to designate the whole length of the Cumberland Expressway as a Future Interstate, with the designation of I-365. The designation would need approval from AASHTO, the FHWA, and upgrades of several interchanges and some improvements before the designation could be implemented.

A connection between the Cumberland Expressway and the Hal Rogers Parkway, dubbed the Somerset Northern Bypass, is planned for the future. On March 9, 2024, a $45 million Community Project Funding earmark was secured in the federal Consolidated Appropriations Act of 2024. A timeline for this extension has not yet been established.

== Exit list ==
| County | Location | mi | km | Exit | Destinations | Notes |
|---|---|---|---|---|---|---|
| Barren | | 0.0 | 0.0 | 1A-B | I-65 – Bowling Green, Louisville | Western terminus; I-65 exit 43; signed as exits 1A (north) & 1B (south); trumpet interchange. |
| Barren | Glasgow | 8.7 | 14.0 | 8 | KY 3600 (Veterans Outer Loop) to KY 90 – Glasgow, Cave City | Opened May 28, 2015 |
| Barren | Glasgow | 11.4 | 18.3 | 11 | US 31E – Glasgow, Scottsville | |
| Barren | Glasgow | 12.9 | 20.8 | 12 | KY 249 | Proposed interchange |
| Barren | Glasgow | 14.0 | 22.5 | 14 | KY 90 – Glasgow, Burkesville | |
| Barren | Glasgow | 15.3 | 24.6 | 15 | KY 1519 (Veterans Outer Loop) to US 68 – Glasgow | Constructed in the 2011-12 fiscal year |
| Metcalfe | Edmonton | 27.4 | 44.1 | 27 | US 68 / KY 80 – Edmonton | Cloverleaf interchange; will be reconfigured to a standard diamond |
| Metcalfe | Edmonton | 29.7 | 47.8 | 29 | US 68 to KY 3524 – Edmonton, Greensburg | Completed October 28, 2013 |
| Adair | Columbia | 46.0 | 74.0 | 46 | KY 61 – Columbia, Burkesville | |
| Adair | Columbia | 48.8 | 78.5 | 49 | KY 55 – Columbia | |
| Russell | Russell Springs | 62.4 | 100.4 | 62 | US 127 – Jamestown, Russell Springs | Originally a cloverleaf interchange; reconstructed as a diamond interchange in 2015 |
| Russell | | 70.7 | 113.8 | 70 | KY 910 – Eli | Opened in 2019 |
| Pulaski | | 78.3 | 126.0 | 78 | KY 80 – Nancy | |
| Pulaski | Somerset | 86.1 | 138.6 | 86 | KY 914 east to KY 80 – Somerset, Burnside, London | Opened in 2010 |
| Pulaski | Somerset | 88.2 | 141.9 | 88 | US 27 – Somerset, Lexington | Opened in 2010; partial cloverleaf interchange; signed as exits 88A (south) and 88B (north); current eastern terminus of parkway |
| Pulaski | Somerset | | | | KY 39 – Somerset, Dabney | Proposed new interchange |
| Pulaski | Somerset | | | | KY 80 – Somerset, London; KY 461 – Mount Vernon | Cloverleaf interchange; future eastern terminus of parkway; transitions into KY 80 |
1.000 mi = 1.609 km; 1.000 km = 0.621 mi
