= 3160 =

3160 may refer to:

== In general ==
- A.D. 3160, a year in the 4th millennium CE
- 3160 BC, a year in the 4th millennium BCE
- 3160, a number in the 3000 (number) range

== Roads numbered 3160 ==
- Hawaii Route 3160, a state highway
- Kentucky Route 3160, a state highway
- Louisiana Highway 3160, a state highway
- Texas Ranch to Market Road 3160, a state highway

== Other uses ==
- 3160 Angerhofer, an asteroid in the Asteroid Belt, the 3160th asteroid registered

== See also ==
- USS Ice King (ID-3160), a WWI U.S. Navy refrigerated cargo ship
