= U.S. Route 68 =

Highway in the United States

U.S. Route 68
- US 68 highlighted in red

Route information
- Length: 560 mi (900 km)
- Existed: 1926–present

Major junctions
- West end: US 62 at Reidland, KY
- I-69 in Draffenville, KY; I-24 near Cadiz, KY; I-65 near Bowling Green, KY; I-64 / I-75 in Lexington, KY; I-71 near Wilmington, OH; I-70 in Springfield, OH
- North end: I-75 / SR 15 in Findlay, OH

Location
- Country: United States
- States: Kentucky, Ohio

Highway system
- United States Numbered Highway System; List; Special; Divided
← US 67	→ US 69

U.S. Route 68 (US 68) is a United States highway that runs for 560 miles (900 km) from northwest Ohio to Western Kentucky. The highway's western terminus is at US 62 in Reidland, Kentucky. Its present eastern terminus is at Interstate 75 in Findlay, Ohio, though the route once extended as far north as Toledo. US 68 intersects with US 62 three times during its route.

== Route description ==
US 68 is signed east–west in Kentucky, while in Ohio it is signed north–south.

=== Kentucky ===
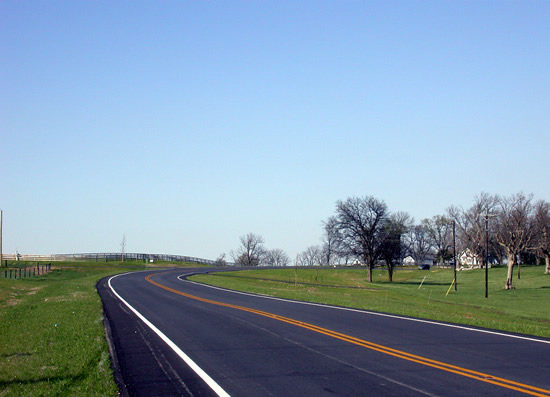
US 68 in Mercer County, Kentucky

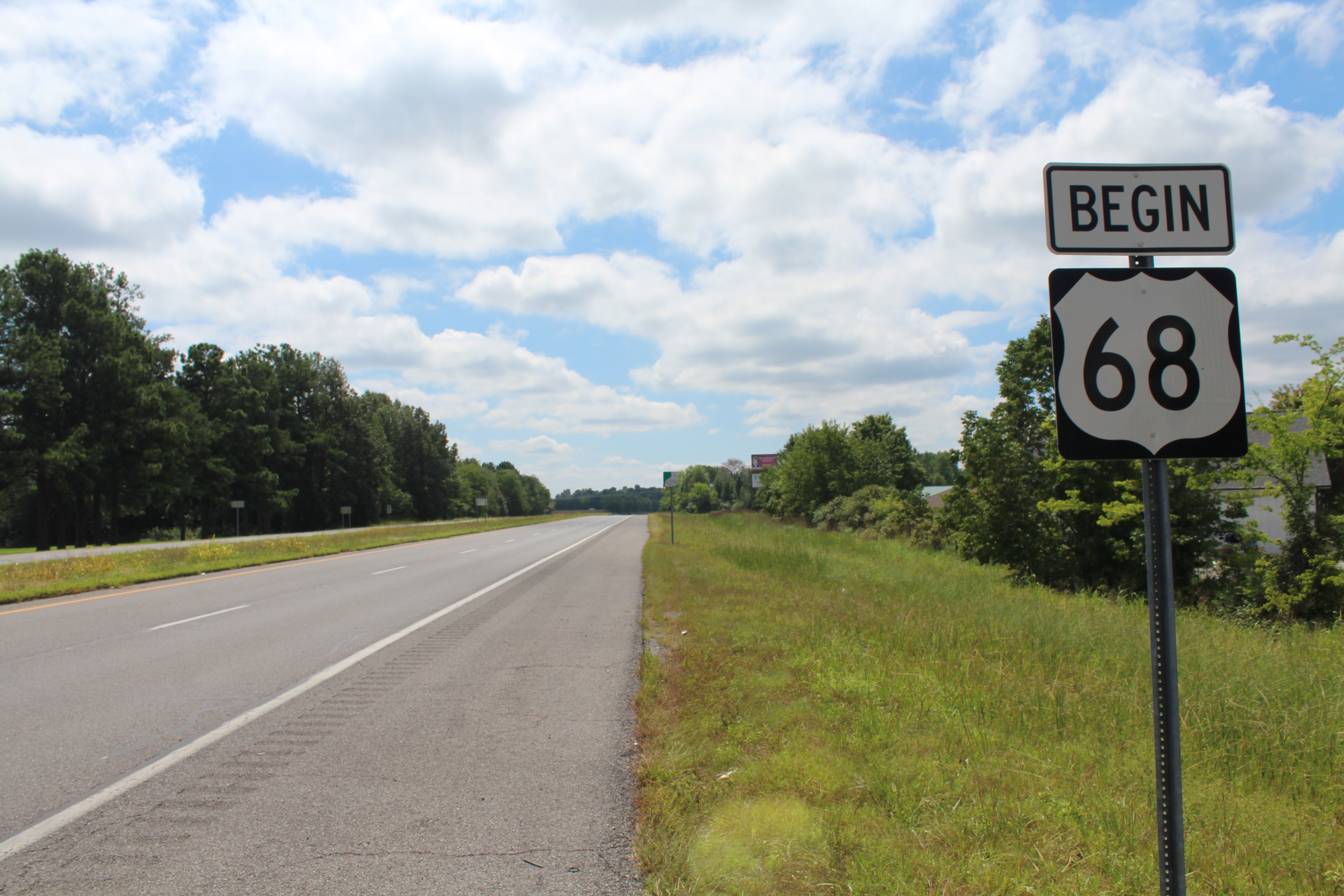
The Beginning of US 68 at an intersection with US 62 near Paducah, KY

U.S. Route 68 is designated as a "Scenic Highway" throughout Kentucky. US 68 passes near or through Reidland, Aurora, Cadiz, Hopkinsville, Elkton, Russellville, Auburn, Bowling Green, Glasgow, Edmonton, Greensburg, Campbellsville, Lebanon, Perryville, Harrodsburg, Lexington, Paris, and Maysville.

The majority of the route winds through forested, hilly terrain. US 68 is Broadway through downtown Lexington, and it is Harrodsburg Road before it leaves Lexington.

The route passes several Civil War battle sites. The Jefferson Davis State Historic Site is located along the highway, approximately 9 miles (14 km) east of Hopkinsville at the small town of Fairview. The Battle of Tebbs Bend Historic Civil War Site is located near Campbellsville and the Perryville Battlefield State Historic Site is outside Perryville.

There is an annual 400-mile (640 km) yard sale, held along the highway for four days in early summer.

The sections of the highway through Campbellsville and Lebanon are slated for expansion to begin in 2008. The long-term goal is to widen and make safer the entire US 68 corridor through Kentucky as part of the Heartland Parkway project.

Sections in Kentucky have been improved in recent years. The Paris Pike was completed in 2003. Work is currently in progress to make US 68 four lanes through Land Between the Lakes. This was accelerated, following a devastating collision of the cargo vessel MV Delta Mariner with Eggner Ferry Bridge in January 2012.

=== Ohio ===
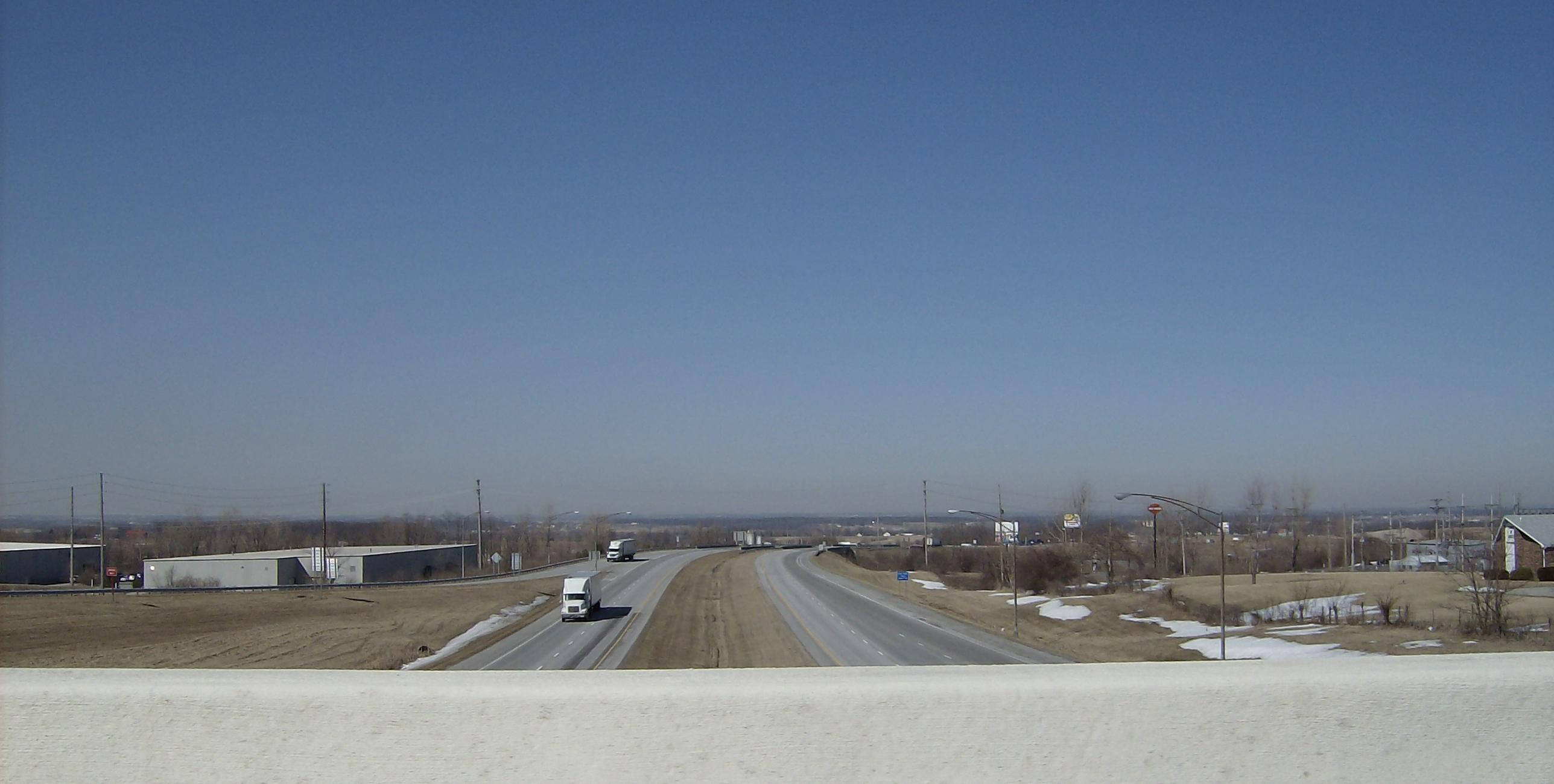
Highest point on US 68 at the US 33 interchange in Bellefontaine, Ohio

US 68 takes a south–north route throughout Ohio, roughly paralleling Interstate 75 but covering counties one tier to the east of those counties covered by I-75. US 68 begins at the William H. Harsha Bridge over the Ohio River and is immediately concurrent with US 52 and US 62 for 5.6 miles (9.0 km) while traveling on the north bank of the river. US 52 leaves the concurrency at Ripley, at which point US 68 and US 62 head north for 5.3 miles (8.5 km) as a generally rural two-lane highway. In Brown County's Jefferson Township, near Redoak, US 62 leaves the concurrency. Afterward, US 68 passes through or bypasses communities such as Georgetown, Mount Orab, Fayetteville, Wilmington, Xenia, and Yellow Springs. Shortly before reaching Interstate 70, it becomes a four-lane expressway, bypassing Springfield before transitioning back to a rural two-lane road as it approaches Urbana. As it continues north, US 68 passes through West Liberty, Bellefontaine, Kenton, Dunkirk, and Arlington on its way north to its terminus at an interchange with Interstate 75 outside Findlay.

Near Redoak in Brown County, the designation "Brigadier General Charles Young Memorial Historical Corridor" leaves the US 62/US 68 concurrency and joins US 68 solely at the routes' junction. The designation is in honor of Young, a pioneering figure in US history, and at his death, the highest-ranking Black officer in the Regular Army. The memorial historical corridor stretches northward to Xenia, where it leaves US 68 and joins US 42 at the junction of those routes.

In total, US 68 traverses 179.1 miles within Ohio.

== History ==
=== Original route in central Kentucky ===
From 1926 until the late 1940s, in terms of the routing between Bowling Green and Perryville, US 68's concurrency with US 31W went further northeast through southeastern Edmonson and northwestern Barren counties to Horse Cave, in Hart County. US 68 then followed the present-day Kentucky Route 218 (Charlie Moran Highway) to the US 31E junction at Wigwam, and then joined US 31E northward through LaRue and Nelson counties to Bardstown, where it joined US 150 for a concurrency that lasted through Washington County until it went solo in Perryville. US 68 moved to its current routing between Bowling Green and Perryville (except for the later rerouting onto Glasgow's Veterans Outer Loop) around 1948–49.

=== Original alignment in northwestern Ohio ===
US 68 previously ran to Toledo, Ohio, terminating at the west approach to the Anthony Wayne Bridge south of downtown, but the Toledo-Findlay segment was decommissioned in the 1950s. It also passed through Springfield, Ohio prior to its realignment onto a four-lane bypass of that city.

=== Widening project in western Kentucky (1990s) ===
For much of the 1990s, much of the US 68/KY 80 corridor from the I-24 junction near Cadiz to the Natcher Parkway (now I-165) junction in Bowling Green was under construction for a regional construction project to widen the corridor to four lanes, with several alignments remaining intact, especially around small towns such as Fairview and Auburn. The project included bypass routes in Hopkinsville and Russellville.

=== Eggner Ferry Bridge incident (2012) ===
Two spans of the US 68/KY 80 Eggner Ferry Bridge over Kentucky Lake collapsed after being struck by a cargo ship on January 26, 2012. The bridge reopened to traffic on May 25, 2012. That bridge was replaced by a new four-lane bridge a few years afterwards.

=== Ohio roundabout ===
In summer 2020, ODOT made plans to convert the intersection with SR 235, the state route's southern terminus, to a roundabout, near Oldtown in Xenia Township, Greene County, Ohio, almost four miles (6.4 km) north of downtown Xenia. Construction was expected to begin in spring 2023 and to be completed that fall, with an estimated cost of $2 million. However, site preparations did not begin until early June 2024, and it was announced that construction would begin on July 16, at a cost of $2.29 million, to be completed by the fall. On December 3, 2024, the roundabout was substantially completed except for minor finish work such as landscaping, which is scheduled to be done in spring 2025.

== Future ==
In Springfield Township, Clark County, Ohio, there is an almost full-access interchange between controlled-access US 68 and US 40/SR 4, which is itself a controlled-access highway until approximately 0.3-mile west of the US 68 interchange. One exit ramp from US 68 ends on Upper Valley Pike, rather than on US 40/SR 4; another entrance ramp includes two-way traffic and an at-grade entrance to a retirement community. On US 40/SR 4 between the controlled-access portion and US 68, there are an at-grade intersection at Upper Valley Pike, other street and driveway breaks in access control and a steep grade on the eastbound approach toward Upper Valley Pike. In September 2013, the Clark County-Springfield Transportation Coordinating Committee (TCC) ranked the US 40/SR 4/Upper Valley Pike intersection as the most hazardous in the county, based on 2010-2012 crash data. Because the road design over the years had played a significant factor in the high number of crashes in the area, the TCC conducted a study; in February 2006 it recommended reconfiguring the US 68 interchange and altering nearby traffic patterns. The Ohio Department of Transportation (ODOT) the same year approved $5 million to fund the project. However, the TCC soon rejected ODOT's money, concluding that even its recommended fix would not be enough to solve the area road network's underlying problems. Instead, the TCC is making small changes, such as improving traffic signal timing and adding signs. ODOT, for its part, is working on reducing the number of driveways near the US 40/SR 4/Upper Valley Pike intersection and on upgrading traffic signals.

On December 7, 2023, ODOT announced that it would provide a $2.6 million grant to construct a single-lane roundabout at Fairfield Pike in Springfield Township, Clark County, Ohio, on the border with Springfield, in 2028.

== Major intersections ==
State	County	Location	mi	km	Destinations	Notes
Kentucky	McCracken	Reidland	0.000	0.000	US 62 – Paducah, Kentucky Dam	Western terminus
Kentucky	McCracken		0.882– 1.095	1.419– 1.762	I-24 – St. Louis, Nashville	I-24 Exit 16
Kentucky	McCracken		1.342	2.160	KY 284 west (Benton Road) – Reidland, Symsonia	Eastern terminus of KY 284
Kentucky	McCracken		2.177	3.504	KY 787 (Rosebower Church Road)	
Kentucky	Marshall	Sharpe	3.841	6.181	KY 1042 north (Sharpe School Road) / Sharpe-Elva Road	Southern terminus of KY 1042
Kentucky	Marshall	Sharpe	4.273	6.877	KY 795 south (Scale Road)	Western end of KY 795 concurrency
Kentucky	Marshall	Sharpe	4.357	7.012	KY 795 north (Scale Road) / Brien Cutoff Road	Eastern end of KY 795 concurrency
Kentucky	Marshall		6.005	9.664	KY 1610 north (Mt. Moriah Road)	Southern terminus of KY 1610
Kentucky	Marshall		6.502	10.464	KY 1396 south (Georgia Clark Road South)	Northern terminus of KY 1396
Kentucky	Marshall		7.613	12.252	KY 1712 south (Griggstown Road)	Northern terminus of KY 1712
Kentucky	Marshall		7.842	12.620	KY 1413 north (Patterson Ferry Road)	Southern terminus of KY 1413
Kentucky	Marshall	Palma	9.152	14.729	KY 3456 north (Needmore Road)	Southern terminus of KY 3456
Kentucky	Marshall		9.563	15.390	KY 1422 east (Palma Road)	Western terminus of KY 1422
Kentucky	Marshall		10.462	16.837	KY 95 north	Southern terminus of KY 95
Kentucky	Marshall		11.413	18.367	KY 782 west	Eastern terminus of KY 782
Kentucky	Marshall		12.061– 12.163	19.410– 19.574	I-69 – Mayfield, Calvert City	I-69 exit 47
Kentucky	Marshall	Draffenville	12.339	19.858	US 641 north – Land Between the Lakes Northern Entrance, Kentucky Dam Village State Resort Park	Western end of US 641 concurrency
Kentucky	Marshall	Draffenville	12.755	20.527	US 641 south – Benton, Murray	Eastern end of US 641 concurrency; provides access to Marshall County Hospital in Benton
Kentucky	Marshall	Briensburg	14.509	23.350	KY 58 west (Briensburg Road)	Eastern terminus of KY 58
Kentucky	Marshall		16.115	25.935	Moors Camp Highway	Former KY 963
Kentucky	Marshall		16.627	26.759	KY 1462 west (Benton-Birmingham Road)	Eastern terminus of KY 1462
Kentucky	Marshall		16.677	26.839	Big Bear Highway	Former KY 68 east
Kentucky	Marshall		19.420	31.253	KY 408 west (Eggners Ferry Road)	Eastern terminus of KY 408
Kentucky	Marshall		20.644	33.223	Barge Island Road – Girl Scout Camp, Camp Kum-Ba-Ya, Camp Currie	Former KY 962 north
Kentucky	Marshall	Fairdealing	20.681	33.283	KY 962 south (Old Olive Road)	Northern terminus of KY 962
Kentucky	Marshall		21.469	34.551	KY 1364 south (Olive Creek Road)	Northern terminus of KY 1364
Kentucky	Marshall		21.917	35.272	KY 1484 north	Southern terminus of KY 1484
Kentucky	Marshall	Aurora	28.490	45.850	KY 402 west (Aurora Highway) – Mayfield	Eastern terminus of KY 402
Kentucky	Marshall	Aurora	29.910	48.135	KY 80 west / Bayview Road – Kenlake Lodge and Marina, Murray	Western end of KY 80 concurrency
Kentucky	Kentucky Lake		30.118– 31.183	48.470– 50.184	Eggner's Ferry Bridge	
Kentucky	Trigg	Land Between the Lakes	33.372	53.707	The Trace – Grand Rivers, KY, Dover, TN	Interchange
Kentucky	Trigg		39.491– 39.851	63.555– 64.134	Lake Barkley Bridge	
Kentucky	Trigg	Canton	40.507	65.190	KY 164 south (Linton Road) – Devil's Hill launching ramp, Calhoun Hill launching ramp	Northern terminus of KY 164
Kentucky	Trigg		40.507	65.190	KY 1489 east (State Park Road)	Western terminus of KY 1489; Lake Barkley State Park Airport near eastern end of 1489
Kentucky	Trigg		43.213	69.545	KY 3568 east (Canton Road)	Western terminus of KY 3568; former alignment of US 68
Kentucky	Trigg		45.578	73.351	KY 272 east (Old Canton Road) to KY 1062 south (Maple Grove Road)	Western terminus of KY 272
Kentucky	Trigg		46.016	74.056	KY 1489 west (Blue Spring Road) – Lake Barkley State Resort Park	Eastern terminus of KY 1489; access to Lake Barkley State Park Airport
Kentucky	Trigg		46.885	75.454	KY 3568 west (Old Canton Road)	Eastern terminus of KY 3568; former alignment of US 68
Kentucky	Trigg		47.128	75.845	US 68 Bus. east (Canton Road) – Cadiz	Western terminus of Cadiz business route
Kentucky	Trigg		47.614	76.627	KY 1175 (Old Dover Road) – Cadiz	
Kentucky	Trigg		49.129	79.065	KY 139 (South Road) – Cadiz	
Kentucky	Trigg	Cadiz	51.499	82.880	US 68 Bus. west (Main Street) – Cadiz Business District	Eastern end of Cadiz business route; access to Trigg County Hospital
Kentucky	Trigg	Cadiz	51.719	83.234	KY 3468 east (Hopkinsville Road)	Western terminus of KY 3468; former alignment of US 68
Kentucky	Trigg	Cadiz	54.509	87.724	KY 3468 west (Hopkinsville Road)	Eastern terminus of KY 3468
Kentucky	Trigg	Cadiz	54.744	88.102	KY 1585 south (North Montgomery Road) / KY 276 west (Rocky Ridge Road)	Northern terminus of KY 1585;eastern terminus of KY 276
Kentucky	Trigg		55.083– 55.217	88.647– 88.863	I-24 – Nashville, Paducah	I-24 exit 65
Kentucky	Trigg		55.779	89.768	KY 958 north (Barefield Road)	Southern terminus of KY 958
Kentucky	Trigg		58.529	94.193	KY 128 north (Wallonia Road) – Cerulean	Southern terminus of KY 128
Kentucky	Trigg		58.766	94.575	KY 3186 east (Tobacco Road) – Gracey	Western terminus of KY 3186
Kentucky	Christian	Gracey	59.610	95.933	KY 1026 (Gracey-Sinking Spring Road)	
Kentucky	Christian		60.271	96.997	KY 3186 west (Lester Road) – Gracey	Eastern terminus of KY 3186
Kentucky	Christian		61.823	99.494	KY 1349 north (Quisenberry Lane)	Southern terminus of KY 1349
Kentucky	Christian	Hopkinsville	66.008	106.230	US 68 Byp. east / US 68 Truck east / KY 1682 east (Eagle Way) to I-169	Western terminus of Hopkinsville bypass/truck routes and KY 1682; 1682 to the north, 68 Bypass/truck to the south; parkway via 1682, hospital via 68 Bypass
Kentucky	Christian	Hopkinsville	67.981	109.405	KY 91 north (Princeton Road) – Princeton, Fredonia	Southern terminus of KY 91
Kentucky	Christian	Hopkinsville	68.293	109.907	KY 109 north (Dawson Springs Road) – Pennyrile Forest State Park	Western end of KY 109 concurrency
Kentucky	Christian	Hopkinsville	69.008	111.058	KY 1007 (North Drive) – Community College, MSU Breathitt Veterinary Center	
Kentucky	Christian	Hopkinsville	69.737	112.231	US 41 south / KY 107 south (South Main Street)	Western end of US 41 concurrency; southern terminus of one-way south section of US 41; 107 to the south, 41 comes in from the north
Kentucky	Christian	Hopkinsville	69.801	112.334	US 41 north / KY 107 north (South Virginia Street)	West end of KY 107 overlap; 107 enters from the south; 41 north to the north, 41 south continues concurrent with 68
Kentucky	Christian	Hopkinsville	69.860	112.429	KY 2544 south (South Liberty Street)	Southern terminus of one-way section of KY 2544; former alignment of US 41 south
Kentucky	Christian	Hopkinsville	69.920	112.525	KY 2544 north (South Clay Street)	Southern terminus of KY 2544; former alignment of US 41 south
Kentucky	Christian	Hopkinsville	70.040	112.718	KY 107 north (South Campbell Street)	Eastern end of KY 107 concurrency
Kentucky	Christian	Hopkinsville	70.125	112.855	US 41 Alt. south (South Walnut Street)	Northern terminus of KY/TN US 41 Alternate route
Kentucky	Christian	Hopkinsville	70.330	113.185	US 41 south / KY 109 south (East 9th Street) – Pembroke	Eastern end of US 41/KY 109 concurrency
Kentucky	Christian	Hopkinsville	70.634– 70.786	113.674– 113.919	I-169 to I-69 – Ft. Campbell, Madisonville	I-169 exit 9
Kentucky	Christian	Hopkinsville	71.585	115.205	KY 1979 west (East 7th Street)	Eastern terminus of KY 1979
Kentucky	Christian	Hopkinsville	71.647	115.305	Airport Road – Hopkinsville-Christian County Airport	
Kentucky	Christian	Hopkinsville	73.520	118.319	US 68 Byp. west (Dr Martin Luther King Jr Way)	Eastern terminus of Hopkinsville bypass route
Kentucky	Christian		75.052	120.784	KY 1716 north (Overby Lane)	Southern terminus of KY 1716
Kentucky	Christian		77.744	125.117	KY 1027 west (Rosetown Road)	Eastern terminus of KY 1027
Kentucky	Christian		79.142	127.367	US 68 Alt. east (Jefferson Davis Road) – Fairview	Western terminus of US 68 alternate route
Kentucky	Christian		79.884	128.561	KY 1843 (Vaughns Grove-Fairview Road) – Fairview	
Kentucky	Christian		80.436	129.449	Britmart Road – Jefferson Davis Monument State Historic Site	Former KY 1081
Kentucky	Todd		81.201	130.680	US 68 Alt. west (Jefferson Davis Road) – Fairview	Eastern terminus of US 68 alternate route
Kentucky	Todd	Tress Shop	85.228	137.161	KY 475 south (Tress Shop Road)	Northern terminus of KY 475
Kentucky	Todd	Elkton	86.470	139.160	US 68 Bus. east / North David Hightower – Elkton	Western terminus of Elkton business route
Kentucky	Todd	Elkton	89.234	143.608	KY 181 (Greenville Road) – Elkton Historic District, Birthplace of Robert Penn Warren, Lake Malone State Park, Elkton Guthrie Airport	Lake Malone to the north, everything else to the south
Kentucky	Todd	Elkton	91.419	147.125	US 68 Bus. east / Williams Hill Road – Elkton	Eastern terminus of Elkton business route
Kentucky	Todd		94.433	151.975	KY 1309 east (Old Volney Road) – Daysville	Western terminus of KY 1309
Kentucky	Logan	Whippoorwill	97.884	157.529	KY 1151 (Union Church Road)	
Kentucky	Logan	Russellville	103.323	166.282	US 68 Bus. east (Hopkinsville Road) / US 431 south – Adairsville, Clarksville, TN	Western terminus of Russellville business route; eastern end of US 431 concurrency
Kentucky	Logan	Russellville	103.806	167.060	KY 178 (Highland Lick Road)	
Kentucky	Logan	Russellville	104.814	168.682	US 431 north / Terry Wilcut Highway – Lewisburg, Central City, Boy Scout Camp, Lake Malone State Park	Eastern end of US 431 concurrency
Kentucky	Logan	Russellville	105.197	169.298	KY 3519 (North Main Street / Lewisburg Road)	
Kentucky	Logan		107.304	172.689	KY 79 (Peyton Street / Morgantown Road)	
Kentucky	Logan	Russellville	109.031	175.468	US 68 Bus. west (Bowling Green Road) / US 79 south (Russellville Bypass) – Franklin, Adairsville, Clarksville	Eastern end of Russellville business route; northern terminus of US 79; Russellville-Logan County Airport to the south via 79
Kentucky	Logan		113.290	182.323	KY 2369 south (Dennis-Corinth Road) / Stevenson Mill Road	Northern terminus of KY 2369
Kentucky	Logan		115.717	186.228	KY 722 west (Duncans Chapel Road)	Eastern terminus of KY 722
Kentucky	Logan	Auburn	116.508	187.501	US 68 Bus. east (West Main Street) / Matlock Lane – Auburn Business District	Western terminus of Auburn business route
Kentucky	Logan	Auburn	118.173	190.181	KY 103 – Auburn Elementary School, Chandlers Chapel	
Kentucky	Logan	Auburn	119.513	192.338	US 68 Bus. west (East Main street) – Auburn Business District	Eastern end of Auburn business route
Kentucky	Logan		121.445	195.447	KY 73 (South Union Road / Cave Springs Road) – 1869 Shaker Tavern, Historic Franklin	Michigan left intersection
Kentucky	Logan		122.694	197.457	KY 1466 (Shakertown Road) – South Union Shaker Village	
Kentucky	Logan		124.105	199.728	KY 2349 south (Stamps Road)	Northern terminus of KY 2349; road continues as Stamps Road north of intersection
Kentucky	Warren		124.478	200.328	KY 240 east (Petros Road)	Western terminus of KY 240
Kentucky	Warren	Rockfield	127.460	205.127	KY 242 east (Richpond-Rockfield Road) – Rockfield	Western terminus of KY 242
Kentucky	Warren		129.180	207.895	KY 1083 north / Murphy Road	Northern terminus of KY 1083
Kentucky	Warren	Bowling Green	131.615	211.814	KY 432 north (Blue Level Road)	Southern terminus of KY 432
Kentucky	Warren	Bowling Green	132.153– 132.467	212.680– 213.185	I-165 to I-65 – Kentucky State Police, Owensboro	I-165 Exit 6
Kentucky	Warren	Bowling Green	133.493	214.836	US 231 south (Campbell Lane) / US 68 Bus. east (Russellville Road) to I-165	Western end of Bowling Green business route; western end of US 231 concurrency; I-165 via 231 south
Kentucky	Warren	Bowling Green	134.975	217.221	US 231 Bus. south / US 231 north (Morgantown Road) to I-165	Northern terminus of US 231 business; eastern terminus of US 231 concurrency; college via 231 business
Kentucky	Warren	Bowling Green	135.817	218.576	KY 2665 (Glen Lily Road)	
Kentucky	Warren	Bowling Green	136.755	220.086	KY 1435 north (Barren River Road)	Southern terminus of KY 1435
Kentucky	Warren	Bowling Green	138.621	223.089	KY 185 north	Southern terminus of KY 185; road continues as Gordon Avenue south of intersection
Kentucky	Warren	Bowling Green	138.930	223.586	US 68 Bus. west (Adams Street) / KY 234 south (East 7th Street) – Western Kentucky University	Eastern end of Bowling Green bus. route; northern terminus of KY 234; WKU Health Services via 234
Kentucky	Warren	Bowling Green	139.407	224.354	US 31W south (East Riverview Drive) / Riverview Drive – Beech Bend Park	Western end of US 31W concurrency; Commonwealth Regional Specialty Hospital just east of intersection; Beech Bend via Riverview Drive
Kentucky	Warren	Bowling Green	140.859	226.691	KY 3225 west (River Street)	Eastern terminus of KY 3225; former alignment of 31W
Kentucky	Warren	Bowling Green	141.826	228.247	KY 1402 east (Porter Pike)	Western terminus of KY 1402
Kentucky	Warren	Bowling Green	142.108	228.701	KY 446 east to I-65 – Nashville, Louisville, National Corvette Museum	Interchange
Kentucky	Warren	Bowling Green	142.822	229.850	KY 957 north (Plum Springs Loop)	Southern terminus of KY 957
Kentucky	Warren	Bowling Green	145.141	233.582	KY 526 west (Mount Olivet Road) / Scottys Way	Eastern terminus of KY 526
Kentucky	Warren	Bowling Green	145.642	234.388	US 31W north (Louisville Road) to I-65 north	Eastern end of US 31 concurrency
Kentucky	Warren	Bowling Green	146.777	236.215	KY 3145 south to I-65 – Nashville, Louisville	Ramp to KY 3145 south and ramp from KY 3145 north
Kentucky	Warren		150.936	242.908	I-65 south – Nashville	Entrance to southbound I-65 and ramp from northbound I-65; I-65 north exit 36
Kentucky	Warren		152.641	245.652	KY 101 (Smiths Grove-Scottsville Road) to I-65	I-65 to the north
Kentucky	Warren		156.969	252.617	KY 259 north	Southern terminus of KY 259
Kentucky	Barren				KY 2240 south (Mary Oaks-Ralton Road)	Northern terminus of KY 2240
Kentucky	Barren	Bon Ayr	161.649	260.149	KY 255 (Bon Ayr Road / Park City-Bon Ayr Road)	
Kentucky	Barren		165.561	266.445	KY 2189 north (Glasgow Road)	Southern terminus of KY 2189
Kentucky	Barren	Glasgow	167.727	269.930	KY 3600 west (Veterans Outer Loop) / US 68 Bus. east (New Glasgow Road) to Cumberland Expressway	Eastern terminus of KY 3600; western end of Glasgow business route; Parkway via 3600
Kentucky	Barren	Glasgow	169.004	271.986	KY 90 (Happy Valley Road) to I-65 north – Cave City	Glasgow Memorial Airport to the northwest
Kentucky	Barren	Glasgow	170.939	275.100	US 31E (North Jackson Highway)	TJ Samson Community Hospital to the south
Kentucky	Barren	Glasgow	173.226	278.780	US 68 Bus. west (Edmonton Road) / KY 1519 south (Veterans Outer Loop) to Cumberland Expressway	Eastern end of Glasgow business route; northern terminus of KY 1519; Parkway via 1519
Kentucky	Barren		173.405	279.068	KY 740 north (Coral Hill Road)	Southern terminus of KY 740
Kentucky	Metcalfe	Wisdom	182.491	293.691	KY 640 (Wisdom Road / Knob Lick-Wisdom Road)	
Kentucky	Metcalfe		186.216– 186.495	299.686– 300.135	Cumberland Expressway – Bowling Green, Somerset	Cumberland Parkway exit 37
Kentucky	Metcalfe	Edmonton	188.534	303.416	KY 861 west (Randolph Street) – Metcalfe Co. Schools, Metcalfe Co. Board of Education	Eastern terminus of KY 861
Kentucky	Metcalfe	Edmonton	189.399	304.808	KY 163 south (South Main Street) / East Stockton Street	Northern terminus of KY 163
Kentucky	Metcalfe	Edmonton	189.839	305.516	KY 80 east (North Main Street) – Columbia	Eastern end of KY 80 concurrency
Kentucky	Metcalfe		190.707	306.913	KY 3524 east (Industrial Drive) / Harvey Hunt Road	Western terminus of KY 3524
Kentucky	Metcalfe		190.787– 191.010	307.042– 307.401	Cumberland Expressway – Somerset, Bowling Green	Cumberland Parkway exit 29
Kentucky	Metcalfe		191.172	307.662	KY 1243 north (Knob Lick Road)	Southern terminus of KY 1243
Kentucky	Metcalfe		192.331	309.527	KY 2399 east (A H Boston Road) / Lawrence England Road	Western terminus of KY 2399
Kentucky	Metcalfe		193.840	311.955	KY 544 east (Bridgeport-Keltner Road)	Western terminus of KY 544
Kentucky	Metcalfe		195.503	314.632	KY 543 west (Toby Hill Road)	Eastern terminus of KY 543
Kentucky	Metcalfe		198.672	319.732	KY 70 west (Sulphur Well-Knob Lick Road) – Cave City	Western end of KY 70 concurrency
Kentucky	Metcalfe		199.688	321.367	KY 745 south (Mill Ridge Road)	Northern terminus of KY 745
Kentucky	Green		201.279	323.927	KY 729 north (Little Barren Road)	Southern terminus of KY 729
Kentucky	Green	Exie	205.429	330.606	KY 487 north (Mell Road)	Southern terminus of KY 487
Kentucky	Green		206.952	333.057	KY 218 west – Horse Cave	Eastern terminus of KY 218
Kentucky	Green		212.740	342.372	KY 61 south (Columbia Highway) – Columbia, Burkesville	Western end of KY 61 concurrency
Kentucky	Green	Greensburg	212.994	342.781	Milby Street – Jane Todd Crawford Memorial Hospital	
Kentucky	Green	Greensburg	213.114	342.974	Industrial Road	Former KY 2189
Kentucky	Green	Greensburg	213.818– 213.950	344.107– 344.319	Bridge over the Green River	
Kentucky	Green	Greensburg	214.208	344.734	KY 417 east (East Columbia Avenue) / West Columbia Avenue	Western terminus of KY 417
Kentucky	Green	Greensburg	215.110	346.186	KY 61 north / KY 3535 south (Industrial Park Drive) – Industrial Park, Health Dept, Hodgenville	Eastern end of KY 61 conncurrency; northern terminus of KY 3535; Industrial park and health dept. via 3535
Kentucky	Green		217.451	349.953	KY 793 west	Eastern terminus of KY 793
Kentucky	Taylor		219.264	352.871	KY 2764 west (Miller Road)	Eastern terminus of KY 2764; road continues as Miller Road east/south of US 68
Kentucky	Taylor		220.513	354.881	KY 883 north (Shiloh Road)	Southern terminus of KY 883
Kentucky	Taylor	Campbellsville	223.209	359.220	KY 323 (West Main Street / Friendship Pike)	
Kentucky	Taylor	Campbellsville	224.104	360.660	KY 55 south (New Columbia Road) / KY 210 west (Hodgenville Road) – Columbia, Battle of Tebb's Bend Monument, Green River Lake, Hodgenville	Western end of KY 55 concurrency; eastern terminus of KY 210
Kentucky	Taylor	Campbellsville	224.868	361.890	North Hoskins Avenue – Campbellsville University	
Kentucky	Taylor	Campbellsville	224.921	361.975	KY 323 south (South Columbia Avenue)	Northern terminus of KY 323
Kentucky	Taylor	Campbellsville	225.041	362.168	KY 70 east / KY 527 north (North Central Avenue)	Eastern end of KY 70 concurrency; southern terminus of KY 527; 527 to the left, 70 to the right
Kentucky	Taylor	Campbellsville	225.157	362.355	KY 289 north (Lebanon Avenue)	Southern terminus of KY 289; access to Taylor Regional Hospital
Kentucky	Taylor	Campbellsville	225.937	363.610	KY 658 east (Roberts Road) / Cherokee Drive	Western terminus of KY 658
Kentucky	Taylor	Campbellsville	226.638	364.739	KY 1799 south (Airport Road) – Taylor County Airport	Northern terminus of KY 1799
Kentucky	Taylor		227.858	366.702	KY 3211 west (Palestine Road) / Rinehart Road	Eastern terminus of KY 3211
Kentucky	Taylor		228.764	368.160	KY 1834 east (Sportsman Lake Road) – Spurlington Lake	Western terminus of KY 1834
Kentucky	Taylor		231.113	371.940	KY 208 north / KY 744 (Spurlington Road / Newton Lane) – Spurlington, Calvary, Spurlington Lake	Southern terminus of KY 208; 744 goes both ways
Kentucky	Marion		234.915	378.059	KY 412 west / Willard Farm Lane	Western end of KY 412 concurrency
Kentucky	Marion		237.268	381.846	KY 412 east (East Calvary Road)	Eastern end of KY 412 concurrency
Kentucky	Marion		239.410	385.293	KY 289 south	Northern terminus of KY 289
Kentucky	Marion		240.362	386.825	KY 2741 south (McElroy Pike)	Northern terminus of KY 2741
Kentucky	Marion		241.394	388.486	KY 426 west (Miller Pike) / Old KY 68	Eastern terminus of KY 426
Kentucky	Marion		242.129	389.669	KY 2154 (Adam Hughes Memorial Highway / Veterans Memorial Highway)	
Kentucky	Marion	Lebanon	243.455	391.803	KY 55 north (West Walnut Street) / Hamilton Heights	Eastern end of KY 55 concurrency; access to Spring View Hospital; 55 also provides access to Lebanon-Springfield Airport
Kentucky	Marion	Lebanon	243.961	392.617	KY 49 / KY 52 west (North Proctor Avenue / South Proctor Avenue) – Liberty, Presbyterian Cemetery, The Kobert Place	Western end of KY 52 concurrency; 49 both ways
Kentucky	Marion	Lebanon	244.074	392.799	KY 55 Spur south (North Spalding Avenue) to KY 55 / South Spalding Avenue – Maxwell House, Visitor Center, Lebanon Civil War Park, Myrtledene	Northern terminus of KY 55 spur
Kentucky	Marion	Lebanon	245.087	394.429	KY 2154 north (Corporate Drive) / Sulphur Springs Road – Springfield	Southern terminus of KY 2154
Kentucky	Marion	Lebanon	245.924	395.776	KY 1404 north (Barbers Mill Road)	Southern terminus of KY 1404
Kentucky	Marion		246.520	396.735	KY 1195 north (Shortline Pike)	Southern terminus of KY 1195
Kentucky	Marion		255.199	410.703	KY 243 south (Gravel Switch Road) – Gravel Switch, Bradfordsville	Northern terminus of KY 243
Kentucky	Boyle		258.540	416.080	KY 34 east (Lebanon Road) – Lebanon	Western terminus of KY 34
Kentucky	Boyle		260.903	419.883	KY 1894 south (Brumfield Road)	Northern terminus of KY 1894
Kentucky	Boyle	Perryville	262.958	423.190	US 150 west (West 2nd Street) / North Buell Street – Perryville Battlefield State Park, Springfield	Western end of US 150 concurrency
Kentucky	Boyle	Perryville	236.067	379.913	US 150 east / KY 52 east (East 2nd Street) / KY 1856 south (South Bragg Street) – Danville	Eastern end of US 150 and KY 52 concurrencies; 52/150 continue east, 68 turns north
Kentucky	Boyle		266.181	428.377	KY 1941 north (Martin Lane)	Southern terminus of KY 1941
Kentucky	Mercer	Nevada	267.104	429.862	KY 1822 south (Quirks Run Road)	Northern terminus of KY 1822
Kentucky	Mercer		272.005	437.750	KY 1915 south (Dry Branch Road)	Northern terminus of KY 1915
Kentucky	Mercer	Harrodsburg	273.038	439.412	KY 152 west (Mooreland Avenue) – Springfield	Western end of KY 152 concurrency
Kentucky	Mercer	Harrodsburg	273.340	439.898	US 127 south (South College Street) / Mooreland Avenue – Danville	Western end of US 127 concurrency
Kentucky	Mercer	Harrodsburg	273.519	440.186	US 127 north (North College Street) / West Lexington Street – Lawrenceburg, Old Fort Harrod State Park	Eastern end of US 127 concurrency; 127 continues north, 68/152 turn east
Kentucky	Mercer	Harrodsburg	273.935	440.856	KY 152 east (Cane Run Road) / Marimon Avenue – Herrington Lake, Burgin	Eastern end of KY 152 concurrency
Kentucky	Mercer	Harrodsburg	274.879	442.375	US 127 Byp.	
Kentucky	Mercer		276.402	444.826	KY 1343 north (Curry Pike)	Southern terminus of KY 1343
Kentucky	Mercer	Pleasant Hill	280.940	452.129	KY 33 south (Shakertown Road) – Burgin, Herrington Lake, Danville	Western end of KY 33 concurrency; Shaker Village on north side of intersection
Kentucky	Kentucky River		286.481– 286.599	461.046– 461.236	Brooklyn Bridge	
Kentucky	Jessamine		288.054	463.578	KY 33 north (Pekin Pike) – Versailles	Eastern end of KY 33 concurrency
Kentucky	Jessamine		288.716	464.643	KY 1268 south (West Main Street) – Wilmore, Asbury University	Northern terminus of KY 1268
Kentucky	Jessamine		290.905	468.166	KY 29 south (Lexington Road) / Cardinal Drive – Wilmore, Asbury University	Western end of KY 29 concurrency
Kentucky	Jessamine		291.632	469.336	KY 29 north / Murphy Lane – Nicholasville	Eastern end of KY 29 concurrency
Kentucky	Jessamine		293.757	472.756	KY 169 (Keene Road) – Nicholasville	
Kentucky	Jessamine		295.837	476.104	KY 3375 (Catnip Hill Road) – Springhouse Gardens	
Kentucky	Jessamine	Brannon Woods	297.615	478.965	KY 1980 east (Brannon Road) / West Brannon Road	Western terminus of KY 1980
Kentucky	Fayette	Lexington	299.233	481.569	KY 1267 south (Keene Road) / Old Schoolhouse Lane	Northern terminus of KY 1267
Kentucky	Fayette	Lexington	300.234	483.180	Man o' War Boulevard	
Kentucky	Fayette	Lexington	301.582– 301.748	485.349– 485.616	KY 4 south (West New Circle Road)	Diverging diamond interchange; KY 4 exit 2
Kentucky	Fayette	Lexington	304.204	489.569	US 27 south (Virginia Avenue) / Red Mile Road – University of Kentucky	Western end of US 27 concurrency
Kentucky	Fayette	Lexington	304.758	490.460	KY 922 north (Oliver Lewis Way) to I-75 / I-64 / Bolivar Street	Southern terminus of KY 922
Kentucky	Fayette	Lexington	305.227	491.215	US 25 north / US 421 north (West Vine Street) – Ashland (Henry Clay estate), Cheapside Park	
Kentucky	Fayette	Lexington	305.289	491.315	US 25 south / US 421 south (West Main Street)	
Kentucky	Fayette	Lexington	307.242	494.458	KY 4 (New Circle Road)	
Kentucky	Fayette	Lexington	308.299– 308.430	496.159– 496.370	I-75 / I-64 – Knoxville, Ashland	Interchange. I-75/64 exit 112
Kentucky	Fayette	Lexington	310.820	500.216	KY 3367 east (Johnstown Road)	Western terminus of KY 3367
Kentucky	Fayette	Lexington	311.554	501.398	KY 1973 north (Iron Works Pike) / Mahmoud Lane	Western end of KY 1973 concurrency
Kentucky	Fayette	Lexington	313.053	503.810	KY 1973 south (Muir Station Road)	Eastern end of KY 1973 concurrency
Kentucky	Bourbon		315.680	508.038	KY 1939 north (Hutchison Road)	Southern terminus of KY 1939
Kentucky	Bourbon	Paris	321.164	516.863	KY 1939 (Bethlehem Road / Hume Bedford Pike)	
Kentucky	Bourbon	Paris	321.324	517.121	US 68 Bus. east (South Main Street)	Western terminus of Paris business route; Bourbon Medical Center just northeast of intersection
Kentucky	Bourbon	Paris	322.872	519.612	US 460 (Georgetown Road) – Paris, Georgetown	
Kentucky	Bourbon	Paris	323.290	520.285	US 27 north (Cynthiana Road) – Cynthiana	Eastern end of US 27 concurrency
Kentucky	Bourbon	Paris	325.650	524.083	US 68 Bus. west (Millersburg Road) to US 460 east	Eastern terminus of Paris business route
Kentucky	Bourbon	Paris	325.731	524.213	KY 1940 north (Ruddles Mill Road) – Ruddels Mills	Southern terminus of KY 1940
Kentucky	Bourbon		322.047	518.284	US 68 Bus. east (Millersburg Road) – Millersburg	Western terminus of Millersburg business route
Kentucky	Bourbon		322.487	518.993	KY 1893 (Millersburg-Ruddles Mill Road) – Ruddels Mills	
Kentucky	Bourbon	Millersburg	333.864	537.302	KY 1879 (Millersburg-Cynthiana Road) – Cynthiana	
Kentucky	Nicholas		334.471	538.279	US 68 Bus. west (Maysville Road) / South Johnson Road	Eastern terminus of Millersburg business route
Kentucky	Nicholas		335.007	539.142	KY 386 south (Carpenter Pike)	Northern terminus of KY 386
Kentucky	Nicholas		336.668	541.815	KY 648 west (Walnut Grove Road)	Eastern terminus of KY 648
Kentucky	Nicholas		337.172	542.626	KY 36 (Concrete Road/Old Maysville Road) – Cynthiana, Carlisle	
Kentucky	Nicholas		339.462	546.311	KY 32 (Old Paris Road)	
Kentucky	Nicholas		340.499	547.980	KY 1244 north (Old Maysville Road)	Southern terminus of KY 1244
Kentucky	Nicholas		340.726	548.345	KY 1455 south (Lake Road) – Lake Carnico, 4-H Camp, Carlisle	Western end of KY 1455 concurrency
Kentucky	Nicholas		341.463	549.531	KY 1455 north (Mount Mariah Road)	Eastern end of KY 1455 concurrency
Kentucky	Nicholas		343.709	553.146	KY 606 west (Suggs Road)	Eastern terminus of KY 606
Kentucky	Nicholas		345.296	555.700	KY 1244 south (Old Maysville Road)	Northern terminus of KY 1244
Kentucky	Robertson		347.126	558.645	Main Park Road – Blue Licks Battlefield State Resort Park	
Kentucky	Robertson		347.517	559.274	Main Park Road – Blue Licks Battlefield State Resort Park	
Kentucky	Robertson		348.175	560.333	KY 165 north – Mount Olivet	Western end of KY 165 concurrency
Kentucky	Fleming		349.754	562.875	KY 2505 north (Mount Pleasant Road) / Willow Road	Southern terminus of KY 2505
Kentucky	Fleming		351.982	566.460	KY 165 south (Ewing Road) – Flemingsburg	Eastern end of KY 165 concurrency
Kentucky	Mason		355.852	572.688	KY 550 south (Metcalfe Mill Pike) / East Bolden Road	Northern terminus of KY 550
Kentucky	Mason		357.517	575.368	KY 2517 north (Main Street)	Southern terminus of KY 2157; former routing of US 68
Kentucky	Mason	Mays Lick	358.468	576.898	KY 324 (Raymond Road) – Mayslick, Sardis, Wedonia	
Kentucky	Mason		358.953	577.679	KY 2517 south (Main Street) / Ross Road – Mayslick	Northern terminus of KY 2517; former routing of US 68
Kentucky	Mason		359.871	579.156	KY 2514 north	Southern terminus of KY 2514
Kentucky	Mason		361.599	581.937	KY 2514 south	Northern terminus of KY 2514
Kentucky	Mason	Maysville	364.094	585.952	US 68 Bus. east – Washington	Western end of Maysville business route
Kentucky	Mason	Maysville	367.608	591.608	AA Hwy (KY 9) south / KY 10 east – Maysville	
Kentucky	Mason	Maysville	368.005	592.247	AA Hwy (KY 9) north / KY 10 west – Brooksville	
Kentucky	Mason	Maysville	370.780	596.713	KY 3056 (Germantown Road / Jersey Ridge Road)	
Kentucky	Mason	Maysville	371.548	597.949	KY 8 (West 2nd Street) – Augusta, Dover, Maysville	interchange
Ohio River			371.730– 372.142	598.241– 598.904	William H. Harsha Bridge	
Ohio	Brown	Aberdeen	0.462	0.744	US 52 east / US 62 west – Aberdeen	Southern end of concurrency with US 52 and US 62
Ohio	Brown	Ripley	6.217	10.005	US 52 west (South 2nd Street)	Northern end of US 52 concurrency
Ohio	Brown	Jefferson Township	11.673	18.786	US 62 east – Russellville	Northern end of US 62 concurrency
Ohio	Brown	Pleasant Township	16.658	26.808	SR 125 east – Russellville, West Union	Southern end of SR 125 concurrency
Ohio	Brown	Pleasant Township	17.678	28.450	SR 125 west (East State Street) – Georgetown	Northern end of SR 125 concurrency
Ohio	Brown	Georgetown	20.649	33.231	Mt. Orab Pike (C-30A) – Georgetown Business District	
Ohio	Brown	Mount Orab	27.930	44.949	SR 774 west / Oakland Road	Eastern terminus of SR 774
Ohio	Brown	Mount Orab	30.948– 31.041	49.806– 49.956	SR 32 – Jackson, Cincinnati	Interchange
Ohio	Brown	Fivemile	35.462	57.071	SR 286	
Ohio	Brown	Chasetown	39.280	63.215	SR 131	
Ohio	Brown	Fayetteville	41.084	66.118	US 50 (East Pike Street / West Pike Street)	
Ohio	Brown	Perry Township	44.479	71.582	SR 123	
Ohio	Clinton	Jefferson Township	46.395	74.666	SR 251 south	Northern temrinus of SR 251
Ohio	Clinton	Jefferson Township	50.371	81.064	SR 28 – Blanchester, New Vienna, Martinsville	
Ohio	Clinton	Jefferson Township	54.639	87.933	To SR 350 east – Beach, Marina	
Ohio	Clinton	Jefferson Township	54.720	88.063	To SR 350 west – Clarksville	
Ohio	Clinton	Wilmington	59.993	96.549	SR 134 south	Southern end of SR 134 concurrency
Ohio	Clinton	Wilmington	60.694	97.678	SR 730 south	Northern terminus of SR 730
Ohio	Clinton	Wilmington	60.927	98.053	US 22 east / SR 3 east (West Main Street) – Wilmington College	
Ohio	Clinton	Wilmington	61.010	98.186	US 22 west / SR 3 west (West Locust Street)	
Ohio	Clinton	Wilmington	61.501	98.976	SR 134 north (North Lorish Avenue) / North South Street	Northern terminus of SR 134 concurrency
Ohio	Clinton	Union Township	62.387– 62.516	100.402– 100.610	SR 73 to I-71 south – Hillsboro, Waynesville	Interchange
Ohio	Clinton	Liberty Township	66.143– 66.351	106.447– 106.782	I-71 – Columbus, Cincinnati	Interchange; I-71 exit 50
Ohio	Greene	Xenia	77.166– 77.361	124.187– 124.500	US 35 – Washington CH, Dayton	Interchange
Ohio	Greene	Xenia	78.623	126.531	SR 380 south / South Miami Avenue	Southern end of SR 380 concurrency
Ohio	Greene	Xenia	78.994	127.129	US 35 Bus. (East Main Street/West Main Street) / US 42	Northern terminus of SR 380
Ohio	Greene	Xenia Township	82.759	133.188	SR 235 north (East Xenia Drive)	Southern terminus of SR 235; roundabout
Ohio	Greene	Yellow Springs	88.173	141.901	Dayton Street to I-675	
Ohio	Greene	Yellow Springs	88.330	142.153	SR 343 east – Clifton	
Ohio	Clark	Green Township	91.311	146.951	West Blee Road (CR-794) – Springfield Airport	Former SR 794
Ohio	Clark	Springfield Township	93.829	151.003	Fairfield Pike	At-grade intersection; southern end of freeway
Ohio	Clark	Springfield Township	94.647– 95.041	152.320– 152.954	I-70 – Dayton, Columbus	Interchange;I-70 exits 52A/B
Ohio	Clark	Springfield Township	97.130– 98.215	156.316– 158.062	US 40 / SR 4 – Springfield, Dayton	Interchange; Exits 7A (east) and 7B (west)
Ohio	Clark	Springfield Township	98.545	158.593	SR 41 – Troy, Springfield	Interchange; Exit 8
Ohio	Clark	Springfield	101.684	163.645	SR 334 east (River Road) – Springfield	Interchange
Ohio	Clark–Champaign county line	Bowlusville	104.835	168.716	County Line Road	Interchange; Exit 15
Ohio	Champaign	Urbana Township	106.342	171.141	Springfield-Urbana Pike	At-grade intersection; northern end of freeway
Ohio	Champaign	Urbana	110.425	177.712	SR 55 west (Lewis B. Moore Drive)	Eastern terminus of SR 55
Ohio	Champaign	Urbana	111.381	179.250	US 36 / SR 29 (Miami Street / Scioto Street)	Traffic circle; Mercy Health-Urbana Hospital to the east
Ohio	Champaign	Salem Township	114.744	184.663	SR 296	
Ohio	Champaign	Salem Township	120.511	193.944	SR 507 east – Ohio Caverns	
Ohio	Logan	West Liberty	121.655	195.785	SR 245 (West Baird Street / East Baird Street)	
Ohio	Logan	Liberty Township	123.211	198.289	SR 508 west	Eastern terminus of SR 508
Ohio	Logan	Bellefontaine	129.531	208.460	SR 47 east (North Madriver Street) / SR 540 east (East Sandusky Avenue)	Western terminus of SR 540; southern end of SR 47 west concurrency 68 turns west for a block
Ohio	Logan	Bellefontaine	129.631	208.621	US 68 south / SR 47 west (West Sandusky Avenue) / North Main Street	End one-way; 68 south and 47 west to the west, 68 east turns back north
Ohio	Logan	Bellefontaine	130.780– 130.949	210.470– 210.742	US 33 – Marysville, Huntsville, Russells Point	Interchange
Ohio	Logan	McArthur Township	135.547	218.142	SR 638 north	Southern terminus of SR 638
Ohio	Logan	McArthur Township	136.344	219.424	SR 274	
Ohio	Logan	Rushcreek Township	140.075	225.429	SR 273	
Ohio	Hardin	Kenton	150.531	242.256	SR 53 north (East Espy Street) / SR 67 west (West Espy Street)	Southern end of SR 67 concurrency; southern terminus of SR 53
Ohio	Hardin	Kenton	150.963	242.951	SR 309 (Franklin Street)	
Ohio	Hardin	Kenton	151.029	243.058	SR 67 east (West Columbus Street)	Northern end of SR 67 concurrency
Ohio	Hardin	Kenton	151.109	243.186	SR 31 south (West Carrol Street)	Northern terminus of SR 31
Ohio	Hardin	Blanchard Township	156.887	252.485	SR 701 west	Eastern terminus of SR 701
Ohio	Hardin	Dunkirk	160.506	258.309	SR 81 (West Geneva Street / East Geneva Street)	
Ohio	Hancock	Madison Township	163.537– 163.690	263.187– 263.434	US 30 – Mansfield, Fort Wayne	Interchange
Ohio	Hancock	Arlington	168.085	270.507	SR 103 (East Main Cross Street / West Main Cross Street)	
Ohio	Hancock	Findlay	174.751	281.234	SR 15 east – Carey	Interchange
Ohio	Hancock	Findlay	175.917	283.111	SR 15 west	Interchange; eastern end of SR 15 concurrency
Ohio	Hancock	Findlay	178.099	286.623	Lima Avenue – Findlay, Airport	Interchange; former US 25
Ohio	Hancock	Findlay	178.434	287.162	I-75 / SR 15 north – Dayton, Toledo	Interchange; western end of SR 15 concurrency
Ohio	Hancock	Findlay	178.912	287.931	I-75	Route ends at I-75
1.000 mi = 1.609 km; 1.000 km = 0.621 mi: Concurrency terminus; Incomplete access

== Related routes ==
- U.S. Route 168
- Special routes of U.S. Route 68

Browse numbered routes
← KY 67	KY	→ KY 69
← SR 67	OH	→ SR 68
