= Smiths Grove Presbyterian Church =

Historic church in Kentucky, United States

- U.S. National Register of Historic Places
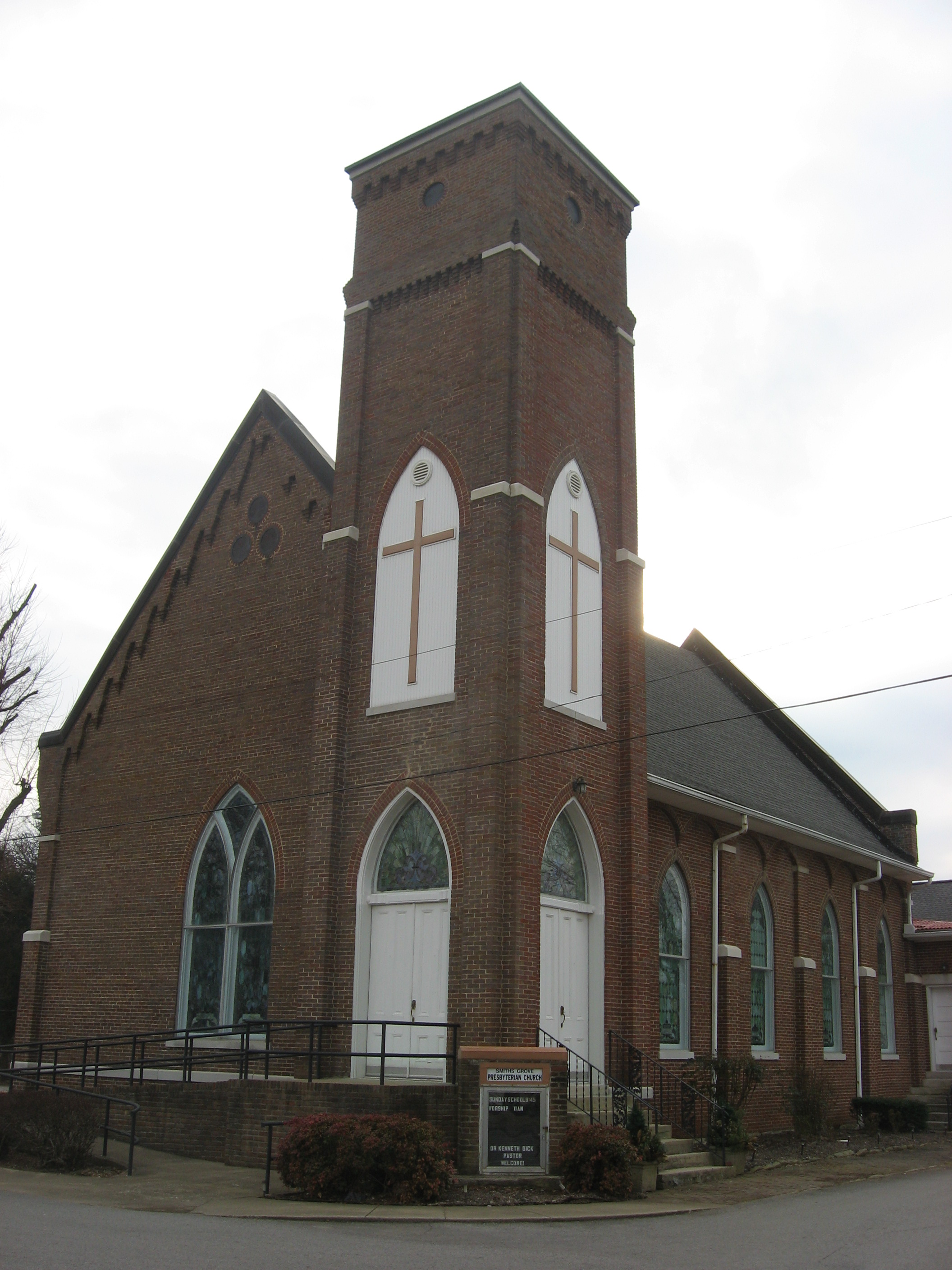
- Front and northern side

- Location within Kentucky Location within the United States
- Location: College and 2nd Sts., Smiths Grove, Kentucky
- Coordinates: 37°03′13″N 86°12′25″W
- Area: less than one acre
- Built: c.1900
- Architectural style: Gothic Revival
- MPS: Warren County MRA
- NRHP reference No.: 79003539
- Added to NRHP: December 18, 1979

The Smiths Grove Presbyterian Church is a historic church at College and 2nd Streets in Smiths Grove, Kentucky. It was built around 1900 and was added to the National Register of Historic Places in 1979.

It is a brick building, with brick laid in American bond, with a side entry tower. A rear addition in brick is compatible with the original.
