= Ruddels Mills, Kentucky =

Unincorporated community in Kentucky, United States

Coordinates: 38°18′15″N 84°14′17″W

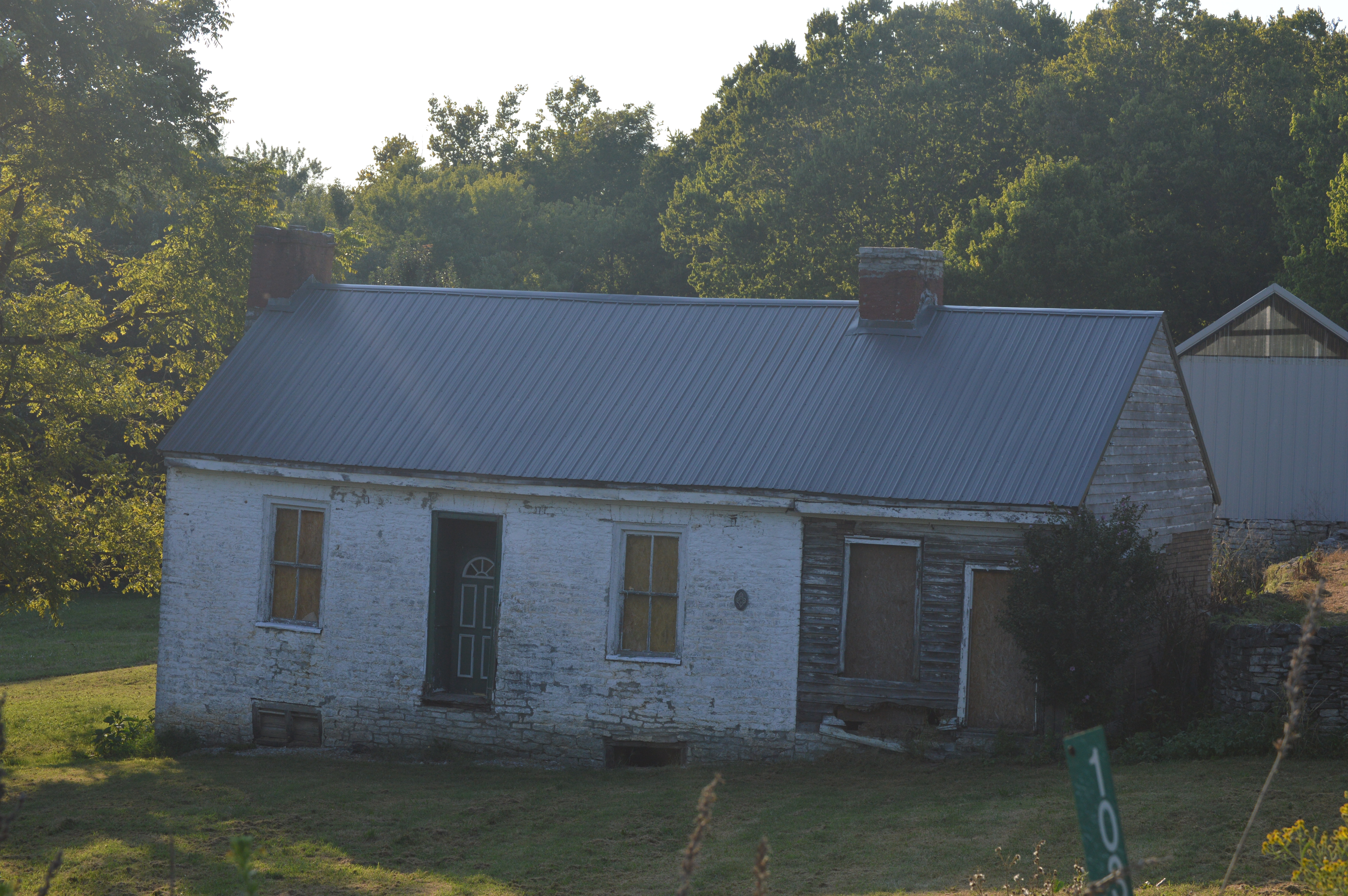
The Miller's House at Ruddels Mills, built pre-1800

Ruddels Mills is an unincorporated community in Bourbon County, Kentucky. It was established by Captain Isaac Ruddell as a mill. The site is located where Hinkston Creek and Stoner Creek join to form the South Fork of the Licking River (not to be confused with Ruddles Station).
