= Lake Barkley Bridge =

US 68/KY 80 bridge near Land Between the Lakes

- Coordinates: 36.8008°N 87.9785°W
- Carries: motor vehicles, pedestrians, bicycles
- Crosses: Lake Barkley
- Locale: US 68 / KY 80 in Trigg County, Kentucky, United States
- Maintained by: Kentucky Department of Transportation
- Followed by: Barkley Dam

Characteristics
- Design: basket handle tied-arch
- Material: Steel
- Total length: 3,805 feet (1,160 m)
- Width: 75 feet (23 m)
- Longest span: 550 feet (170 m)
- No. of lanes: 4 vehicular lanes, 1 multi-use path

History
- Designer: Michael Baker International
- Constructed by: PCL Civil Construction of Denver
- Construction start: February 2015
- Construction cost: $128 million
- Opened: 1932 (original Lawrence bridge); February 12, 2018 (current bridge)
- Inaugurated: September 25, 2019
- Replaces: Henry R. Lawrence Memorial Bridge

Lake Barkley Bridge is a four-lane basket handle tied-arch bridge in western Kentucky carrying U.S. Route 68, Kentucky Route 80, and a multi-use path across Lake Barkley, permitting access from the east to the Land Between the Lakes National Recreation Area. It is illuminated with LED lights.

== Current bridge ==
The current bridge replaced the Henry R. Lawrence Memorial Bridge, originally built in 1932. It was opened to some traffic in 2018 to allow the old bridge to be demolished. The multi-use trail opened on September 13, 2019, and a ribbon-cutting ceremony was held on September 25, 2019.

The replacement was part of a project that also replaced its sister bridge, the Eggner's Ferry Bridge over Kentucky Lake. Due to their location in the New Madrid Seismic Zone and their intended use as an evacuation route during an emergency, the new bridges were designed to withstand a large earthquake, as well as meet current highway standards.

== Henry R. Lawrence Memorial Bridge ==
The previous bridge at this location was a 20 feet (6.1 m) wide, two-lane Parker through truss bridge constructed in 1932. This bridge was named posthumously after newspaperman and former Speaker of the Kentucky House of Representatives Henry R. Lawrence (died 1933) of The Cadiz Record, due to his advocacy for good roads and bridges. In 1962, the bridge was closed until late 1963, during which time the crossing was served by a ferry, and raised 10.5 feet (3.2 m) to allow clearance when the Cumberland River, which it crossed, was impounded and the valley flooded to create Lake Barkley. It was deemed eligible for inclusion on the National Register of Historic Places in 1982, as a product of the Murphy Toll Bridge Act of 1928.
