= Kentucky Route 3524 =

State highway in Kentucky, United States

Kentucky Route 3524
- Industrial Drive
- KY 3524 highlighted in red

Route information
- Maintained by KYTC
- Length: 1.390 mi (2.237 km)

Major junctions
- West end: US 68 in Edmonton
- East end: KY 80 in Edmonton

Location
- Country: United States
- State: Kentucky
- Counties: Metcalfe

Highway system
- Kentucky State Highway System; Interstate; US; State; Parkways
← KY 3523	→ KY 3525

Kentucky Route 3524 (KY 3524) is an urban secondary state route located entirely in Metcalfe County in South Central Kentucky. It runs between U.S. Route 68 (US 68) and KY 80 on the north side of Edmonton, providing access to the city's industrial park. For the benefit of truck drivers hauling cargo to and from the city's factories, KY 3524 is mentioned on exit 30 signage along the nearby Cumberland Parkway between mile markers 28 and 32.

== Major intersections ==
The entire route is in Edmonton, Metcalfe County.

mi	km	Destinations	Notes
0.000	0.000	US 68 (Greensburg Road) to Cumberland Expressway – Greensburg	Western terminus
1.390	2.237	KY 80 (Columbia Road) – Columbia	Eastern terminus
1.000 mi = 1.609 km; 1.000 km = 0.621 mi
