= Mary R. T. McAboy =

American poet (1815–1892)

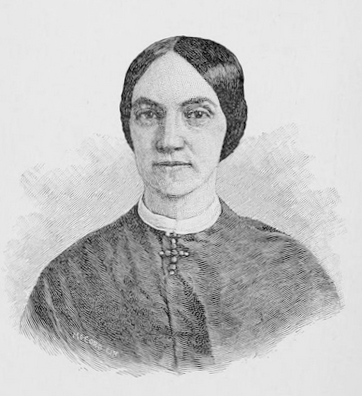
- Born: February 9, 1815; Bourbon County, Kentucky, U.S.
- Died: April 5, 1892 (aged 77); Paris, Kentucky, U.S.
- Occupation: poet
- Spouse: Paradise Lynn McAboy (m. 1839; died 1839)
- Writing career
- Pen name: "M. R. M., Roseheath, Ky."
- Notable work: Roseheath poems

Signature
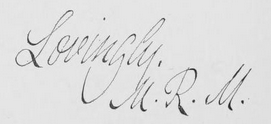

Mary R. T. McAboy (née, Thornton; pen name, M. R. M., Roseheath, Ky.; February 9, 1815 – April 5, 1892) was a 19th-century poet of the American south. From 1850, she was a contributor to the press of Kentucky and elsewhere over the signature of "M. R. M., Roseheath, Ky.". Her writings were universally popular.

== Biography ==
Mary Rootes Thornton was born in Bourbon County, Kentucky, February 9, 1815. (Note: According to Dearinger (2007), Mary Rootes Thornton was born February 6, 1815.) Her father was Peter Thornton of Caroline County, Virginia. Her mother's maiden name was Rowe. There were five siblings in this family: Sally Tunstall (Thornton), Mary Rootes (Thornton), Thomas; Callender, and Read.

She was raised and educated by her uncle, Hon. John Rootes Thornton (1786–1873). He was a prominent lawyer and a member of the Kentucky House of Representatives (1844), and State Senate (1829–33; 1833–37).

On April 24, 1839, she married Rev. Paradise Lynn McAboy (1814–1839), of Washington, Mason County, Kentucky, a young Presbyterian minister. She was widowed four months later when the husband was killed by the falling of a large flour mill at Murphysville, Mason County, Kentucky, on August 29, 1839.

McAboy's signature, “M. R. M., Roseheath, Ky.," was well known at intervals for thirty years to readers of the Louisville Journal, Paris Citizen, Paris True Kentuckian, Memphis Enquirer, Presbyterian Herald of Cincinnati, and other newspapers and monthlies. She resided in the Thornton homestead in Paris, Kentucky where she entertained many distinguished men in the ministry of the church and state. It was George D. Prentice, who, while visiting her, named her homestead, "Roseheath". McAboy died at "Roseheath", Paris, April 5, 1892.

== Selected works ==
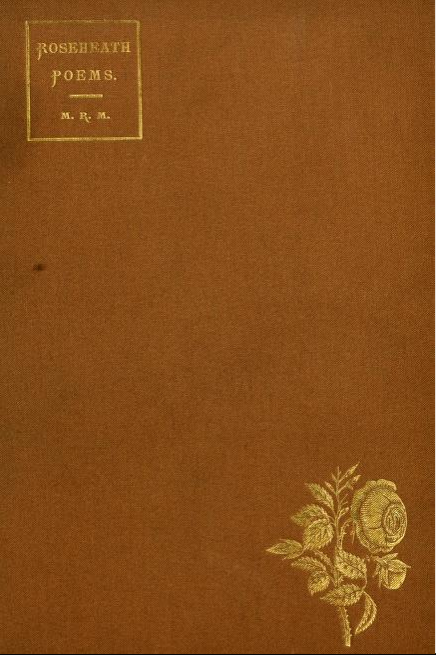
Roseheath poems

- Roseheath poems, 1884
