= Clintonville, Kentucky =

Unincorporated community in Kentucky, United States

Cintonville, Kentucky
- Unincorporated community
- Location within Kentucky
- Coordinates: 38°05′06″N 84°16′06″W
- Country: United States
- State: Kentucky
- County: Bourbon
- Elevation: 994 ft (303 m)
- Time zone: UTC-5 (Eastern (EST))
  - Summer (DST): UTC-4 (EDT)
- Area code: 859
- GNIS feature ID: 489695

Clintonville is an unincorporated community in Bourbon County, Kentucky, United States.

== Geography ==
Clintonville is located at 38°5′6″N 84°16′7″W (38.085120, -84.268653)

== History ==
The community was named for the local Masonic Lodge, which was named for New York Governor DeWitt Clinton.

Clintonville School opened in September 1925, offering one year of high school in addition to the first eight grades. The original building had four classrooms on the first floor. On the second floor there were two classrooms, a small auditorium, and a stage with dressing rooms behind. The addition of indoor plumbing, the gymnasium, and the first cafeteria were completed in 1936. In 1957 three classrooms, a kitchen, cafeteria, bathroom facilities, and the principal's office were added.

A historic site in Clintonville is the Clintonville African American Cemetery Number 1. There is a Rich history of African American culture that is not noted or documented here.
