= Kentucky Route 3600 =

State highway in Kentucky, United States

Kentucky Route 3600
- KY 3600 highlighted in red

Route information
- Maintained by KYTC
- Length: 2.501 mi (4.025 km)
- Existed: May 28, 2015–present

Major junctions
- South end: KY 1297 in Glasgow
- Cumberland Expressway in Glasgow
- North end: US 68 / KY 80 / US 68 Bus. in Glasgow

Location
- Country: United States
- State: Kentucky
- Counties: Barren

Highway system
- Kentucky State Highway System; Interstate; US; State; Parkways
← KY 3571	→ KY 3606

Kentucky Route 3600 (KY 3600) is a secondary urban state highway located entirely in Barren County, Kentucky.

== Route description ==
KY 3600 is the state highway designation for the western extension of the Veterans Outer Loop around the city of Glasgow, the Barren County seat. The route begins at a junction with KY 1267 and ends at a crossroad intersection with the concurrently running U.S. Route 68 (US 68) and KY 80, US 68 Business, and the pre-existing part of the outer loop on the west side of town.

== History ==
During late 2014 and early 2015, the purpose of construction of KY 3600 was to provide another bypass route to ease up congestion on the US 31E By-pass, the major artery through the city. The project also included a fourth interchange on the Louie B. Nunn Cumberland Expressway. The project was completed on May 28, 2015, and the grand opening took place on June 4 of that year.

== Major intersections ==
The entire route is in Glasgow, Barren County.

mi	km	Destinations	Notes
0.000	0.000	KY 1297 (Old Bowling Green Road)	Southern terminus
0.386	0.621	Cumberland Expressway	Cumberland Parkway exit 8
2.501	4.025	US 68 (Bowling Green Road) / KY 80 (Veterans Outer Loop) / US 68 Bus. east (West Main Street)	Northern terminus
1.000 mi = 1.609 km; 1.000 km = 0.621 mi
