= Gotts, Kentucky =

Gotts
- Unincorporated community
- Location within the state of Kentucky
- Coordinates: 36°58′22.15″N 86°18′49.96″W
- Country: United States
- State: Kentucky
- County: Grayson
- Elevation: 532 ft (162 m)
- Time zone: UTC-6 (Central (CST))
  - Summer (DST): UTC-5 (CST)
- Area codes: 270 and 364
- GNIS feature ID: 493053

Gotts is an unincorporated community in eastern Warren County in south-central Kentucky, United States.

== Geography ==
Gotts is located at the junction of KY 1402 and KY 1297 about 3 miles (4.8 km) outside of Bowling Green city limits.
