= Stoner Creek (Kentucky) =

Stream in Bourbon and Clark County, Kentucky, U.S.

Coordinates: 38.3053535°N 84.2404874°W

Stoner Creek is a stream in Bourbon and Clark counties, Kentucky, in the United States.

It was named for Michael Stoner, who settled near the creek in the 18th century.

Stoner Creek runs through Kentucky horse country.

== See also ==
- Stoner Creek Stud
- List of rivers of Kentucky
