= Gainesville, Kentucky =

Unincorporated community in Kentucky, United States

Gainesville
- Unincorporated community
- Location within the state of Kentucky Gainesville (the United States)
- Coordinates: 36°51′02″N 86°09′30″W
- Country: United States
- State: Kentucky
- County: Allen
- Elevation: 548 ft (167 m)
- Time zone: UTC−6 (CST)
  - Summer (DST): UTC−5 (CDT)
- ZIP codes: 42164
- GNIS feature ID: 492651

Gainesville is a rural unincorporated community in northeastern Allen County, Kentucky, United States. Kentucky Route 101 meets the east end of Kentucky Route 234 (Cemetery Road) as it passes to the west of Gainesville.
