= Gainesville station =

Gainesville station may refer to:

- Gainesville station (Georgia), a train station in Gainesville, Georgia, serving Amtrak
- Gainesville station (Texas), a train station in Gainesville, Texas, serving Amtrak
- Gainesville station (Virginia), a proposed train station in Gainesville, Virginia, serving Virginia Railway Express
- Old Gainesville Depot, a former train station in Gainesville, Florida
