= Meador, Kentucky =

Unincorporated community in Kentucky, United States

Meador
- Unincorporated community
- Location within the state of Kentucky Meador (the United States)
- Coordinates: 36°53′28″N 86°10′34″W
- Country: United States
- State: Kentucky
- County: Allen
- Elevation: 663 ft (202 m)
- Time zone: UTC−6 (CST)
  - Summer (DST): UTC−5 (CDT)
- ZIP codes: 42164
- GNIS feature ID: 508583

Meador is a rural unincorporated community in northern Allen County, Kentucky, United States.

== Geography ==
The community is located near the intersection of Kentucky Route 101 and Kentucky Route 1533 (Meadow-Port Oliver Road) before the former of which crosses the Barren River into Warren County.

== Media ==
Meador is home to the transmitting facility of Bowling Green radio station WGGC (95.1 MHz).

While the community itself is in the Nashville, Tennessee designated market area in terms of television service, the community is also well-served by Bowling Green-area radio and television outlets.
