= Three Forks, Warren County, Kentucky =

Unincorporated community in Kentucky, United States

Three Forks
- Unincorporated community
- Location within the state of Kentucky Three Forks (the United States)
- Coordinates: 36°57′11″N 86°12′14″W
- Country: United States
- State: Kentucky
- County: Warren
- Elevation: 620 ft (190 m)
- Time zone: UTC-6 (Central (CST))
  - Summer (DST): UTC-5 (CST)
- GNIS feature ID: 509206

Three Forks is an unincorporated community in Warren County, Kentucky, United States.
