= Bourbon County, Kentucky =

County in Kentucky, United States

- County
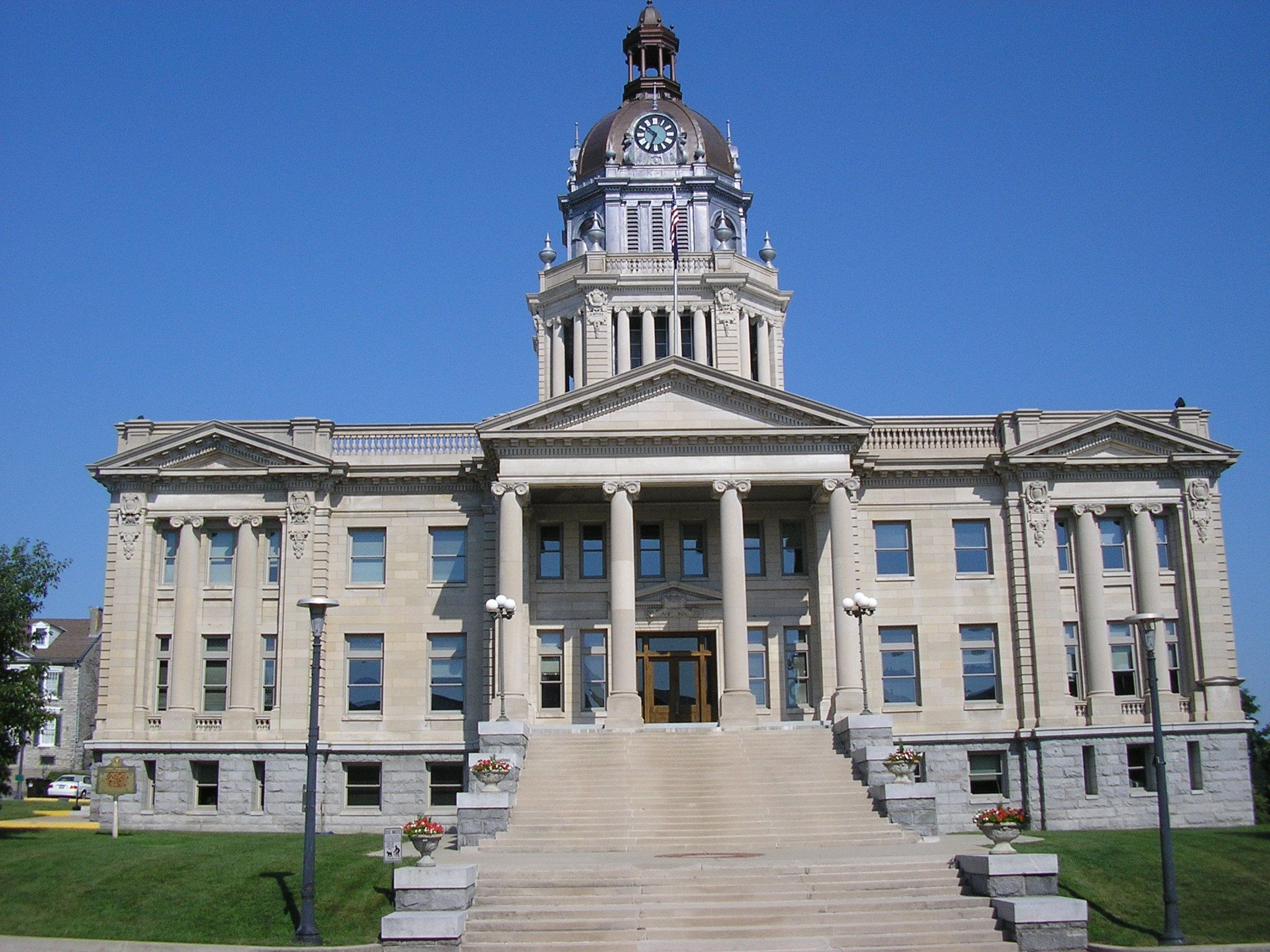
- Bourbon County Courthouse in Paris

- Seal

- Location within the U.S. state of Kentucky
- Coordinates: 38°12′N 84°13′W
- Country: United States
- State: Kentucky
- Founded: 1785
- Named for: House of Bourbon
- Seat: Paris
- Largest city: Paris

Government
  - Judge/Executive: Mike Williams (R)

Area
  - Total: 292 sq mi (760 km^{2})
  - Land: 290 sq mi (750 km^{2})
  - Water: 1.9 sq mi (4.9 km^{2}) 0.6%

Population (2020)
  - Total: 20,252
  - Estimate (2025): 20,243 ▼
  - Density: 70/sq mi (27/km^{2})
- Time zone: UTC−5 (Eastern)
  - Summer (DST): UTC−4 (EDT)
- Congressional district: 6th
- Website: www.bourbonky.com

Bourbon County is a county located in the U.S. state of Kentucky. As of the 2020 census, the population was 20,252. Its county seat is Paris. Bourbon County is part of the Lexington-Fayette, KY Metropolitan Statistical Area. It is one of Kentucky's nine original counties, and is best known for its historical association with bourbon whiskey.

== History ==
=== Old Bourbon ===
Bourbon County was established in 1785 from a portion of Fayette County, Virginia, and named after the French House of Bourbon, in gratitude for King Louis XVI's assistance during the American Revolutionary War.

Bourbon County, Virginia, originally comprised 34 of Kentucky's 120 current counties, including the current Bourbon County. This larger area later became known as Old Bourbon. Bourbon became part of the new state of Kentucky when it was admitted to the Union in 1792.

=== Birthplace of Bourbon whiskey ===
Whiskey was an early product of the area, and whiskey barrels from the area were marked Old Bourbon when they were shipped downriver from the local port on the Ohio River. As it was made mostly from corn (maize), it had a distinctive flavor, and the name bourbon came to be used to distinguish it from other regional whiskey styles, such as Monongahela, a product of western Pennsylvania, which may have generally been a rye whiskey. The use of the term Old in the phrase Old Bourbon, was likely misconstrued as a reference to the aging of the whiskey rather than part of the name of the geographic area. The port, originally known as Limestone, now Maysville, was in Bourbon County until the borders were redrawn in 1789 when it became part of the Mason County of Virginia, and it is now in Mason County, Kentucky. Thirty-four modern Kentucky counties were once part of the original Bourbon County, including the current county of that name.

Except for a few distilleries that were authorized to produce it for medicinal purposes, the bourbon industry was wiped out in 1919 when Prohibition took effect. Kentucky adopted prohibition a year earlier than the national prohibition. Within the boundaries of Bourbon County as it stands today there were, by some counts, 26 distilleries. All of these were shut down in 1919, and no distilleries resumed operation there until late 2014, a period of 95 years. At present, alcohol production and sales in Kentucky are regulated by a patchwork of laws which the Kentucky Supreme Court called a "maze of obscure statutory language".

=== Courthouse ===
The courthouse was destroyed by fire in 1872 and 1901, resulting in the loss of county records. The current courthouse is the county's fourth.

== Geography ==
According to the United States Census Bureau, the county has a total area of 292 square miles (760 km^{2}), of which 290 square miles (750 km^{2}) is land and 1.9 square miles (4.9 km^{2}) (0.6%) is water.

There are no sizable lakes in the county, although there are several streams. Primary among these is Stoner Creek, on which the county seat is situated. This large stream is a principal tributary of the South Fork of the Licking River.

The county's topography is predominantly gently rolling hills. Due to agricultural development, very little of the county's land area can be characterized as forested, though deciduous trees are a common feature of the landscape.

=== Adjacent counties ===
- Harrison County (northwest)
- Nicholas County (northeast)
- Bath County (east)
- Montgomery County (southeast)
- Clark County (south)
- Fayette County (southwest)
- Scott County (west)

== Demographics ==
Historical population
Census	Pop.	Note	%±
1790	7,837		—
1800	12,825		63.6%
1810	18,009		40.4%
1820	17,664		−1.9%
1830	18,436		4.4%
1840	14,478		−21.5%
1850	14,466		−0.1%
1860	14,860		2.7%
1870	14,863		0.0%
1880	15,956		7.4%
1890	16,976		6.4%
1900	18,069		6.4%
1910	17,462		−3.4%
1920	18,418		5.5%
1930	18,060		−1.9%
1940	17,932		−0.7%
1950	17,752		−1.0%
1960	18,178		2.4%
1970	18,476		1.6%
1980	19,405		5.0%
1990	19,236		−0.9%
2000	19,360		0.6%
2010	19,985		3.2%
2020	20,252		1.3%
2025 (est.)	20,243	▼	0.0%
US Decennial Census; 1790-1960 1900–1990; 1990-2000 2010–2020

=== 2020 census ===
As of the 2020 census, the county had a population of 20,252. The median age was 41.7 years. 23.5% of residents were under the age of 18 and 18.8% of residents were 65 years of age or older. For every 100 females there were 94.5 males, and for every 100 females age 18 and over there were 89.7 males age 18 and over.

The racial makeup of the county was 84.3% White, 5.1% Black or African American, 0.3% American Indian and Alaska Native, 0.4% Asian, 0.0% Native Hawaiian and Pacific Islander, 4.6% from some other race, and 5.3% from two or more races. Hispanic or Latino residents of any race comprised 7.3% of the population.

55.6% of residents lived in urban areas, while 44.4% lived in rural areas.

There were 8,220 households in the county, of which 31.1% had children under the age of 18 living with them and 29.3% had a female householder with no spouse or partner present. About 28.1% of all households were made up of individuals and 12.8% had someone living alone who was 65 years of age or older.

There were 9,112 housing units, of which 9.8% were vacant. Among occupied housing units, 61.7% were owner-occupied and 38.3% were renter-occupied. The homeowner vacancy rate was 1.5% and the rental vacancy rate was 6.3%.

=== 2010 census ===
As to the census of 2010, there were 19,985 people and 8,128 households residing in the county. The population density was 66 per square mile (25/km^{2}). There were 8,349 housing units at an average density of 29 per square mile (11/km^{2}). The racial makeup of the county was 90.38% White, 6.94% Black or African American, 0.15% Native American, 0.14% Asian, 0.01% Pacific Islander, 1.36% from other races, and 1.02% from two or more races. 2.60% of the population were Hispanic or Latino of any race.

There were 7,681 households, out of which 32.80% had children under the age of 18 living with them, 54.70% were married couples living together, 12.30% had a female householder with no husband present, and 29.10% were non-families. 24.80% of all households were made up of individuals, and 11.10% had someone living alone who was 65 years of age or older. The average household size was 2.49 and the average family size was 2.95.

In the county, the population was spread out, with 25.00% under the age of 18, 8.10% from 18 to 24, 28.60% from 25 to 44, 24.70% from 45 to 64, and 13.60% who were 65 years of age or older. The median age was 38 years. For every 100 females, there were 94.60 males. For every 100 females age 18 and over, there were 91.00 males.

The median income for a household in the county was $35,038, and the median income for a family was $42,294. Males had a median income of $30,989 versus $23,467 for females. The per capita income for the county was $18,335. About 12.30% of families and 14.00% of the population were below the poverty line, including 19.10% of those under age 18 and 11.90% of those age 65 or over.

Bourbon County is served by a public school school district that operates six schools and has 2,674 students, along with a 20% minority rate as of 2025.

== Communities ==
=== Cities ===
- Millersburg
- North Middletown
- Paris (county seat)

=== Unincorporated communities ===
- Cane Ridge
- Centerville
- Clintonville
- Little Rock
- Ruddles Mills
- Shawhan

== Politics ==
United States presidential election results for Bourbon County, Kentucky
Year	Republican		Democratic		Third party(ies)	
Year	No.	%	No.	%	No.	%
1912	1,744	38.32%	2,362	51.90%	445	9.78%
1916	2,167	44.04%	2,715	55.18%	38	0.77%
1920	4,029	42.30%	5,452	57.24%	43	0.45%
1924	3,691	47.06%	4,034	51.43%	118	1.50%
1928	4,512	58.34%	3,218	41.61%	4	0.05%
1932	2,820	37.09%	4,759	62.59%	25	0.33%
1936	2,471	38.83%	3,872	60.84%	21	0.33%
1940	2,673	38.57%	4,254	61.38%	4	0.06%
1944	1,957	33.72%	3,828	65.97%	18	0.31%
1948	1,610	29.64%	3,562	65.57%	260	4.79%
1952	2,229	40.02%	3,339	59.95%	2	0.04%
1956	2,475	42.75%	3,263	56.36%	52	0.90%
1960	2,379	42.98%	3,156	57.02%	0	0.00%
1964	1,222	22.99%	4,068	76.52%	26	0.49%
1968	1,848	33.85%	2,566	47.00%	1,046	19.16%
1972	3,180	62.02%	1,860	36.28%	87	1.70%
1976	2,260	38.28%	3,504	59.35%	140	2.37%
1980	2,475	39.00%	3,641	57.37%	230	3.62%
1984	3,836	58.54%	2,649	40.42%	68	1.04%
1988	3,308	53.57%	2,793	45.23%	74	1.20%
1992	2,707	39.12%	2,895	41.84%	1,318	19.05%
1996	2,592	41.42%	3,030	48.42%	636	10.16%
2000	3,881	54.65%	3,048	42.92%	173	2.44%
2004	4,953	60.28%	3,198	38.92%	66	0.80%
2008	4,820	57.86%	3,385	40.64%	125	1.50%
2012	4,692	59.22%	3,075	38.81%	156	1.97%
2016	5,569	63.26%	2,791	31.71%	443	5.03%
2020	6,190	64.16%	3,296	34.16%	162	1.68%
2024	6,284	65.89%	3,088	32.38%	165	1.73%

For most of the 20th century Bourbon county was a fairly reliable Democratic county. However, since the dawn of the 21st century it has now become a solidly Republican county.

The county voted "No" on 2022 Kentucky Amendment 2, an anti-abortion ballot measure, by 58% to 42%, and backed Donald Trump with 64% of the vote to Joe Biden's 34% in the 2020 presidential election.

=== Elected officials ===
Elected officials as of January 3, 2025
U.S. House	Andy Barr (R)	KY 6
Ky. Senate	Stephen West (R)	27
Ky. House	Matthew Koch (R)	72

== Notable people ==
- Mitchell Dazey (1820–1896), Illinois politician and farmer; was born in Bourbon County.
- Mary Rootes Thornton McAboy (1815–1892), poet

== See also ==
- Bourbon County, Kansas
- National Register of Historic Places listings in Bourbon County, Kentucky
