= Jackson Highway =

Auto trail connecting Chicago and New Orleans

Jackson Highway

Route information
- Existed: 1911–present

Major junctions
- South end: New Orleans, LA
- North end: Chicago, IL

Location
- Country: United States

Highway system
- Auto trails

The Jackson Highway was an auto trail in the United States connecting Chicago and New Orleans via Nashville. It was named after General and U.S. President Andrew Jackson.

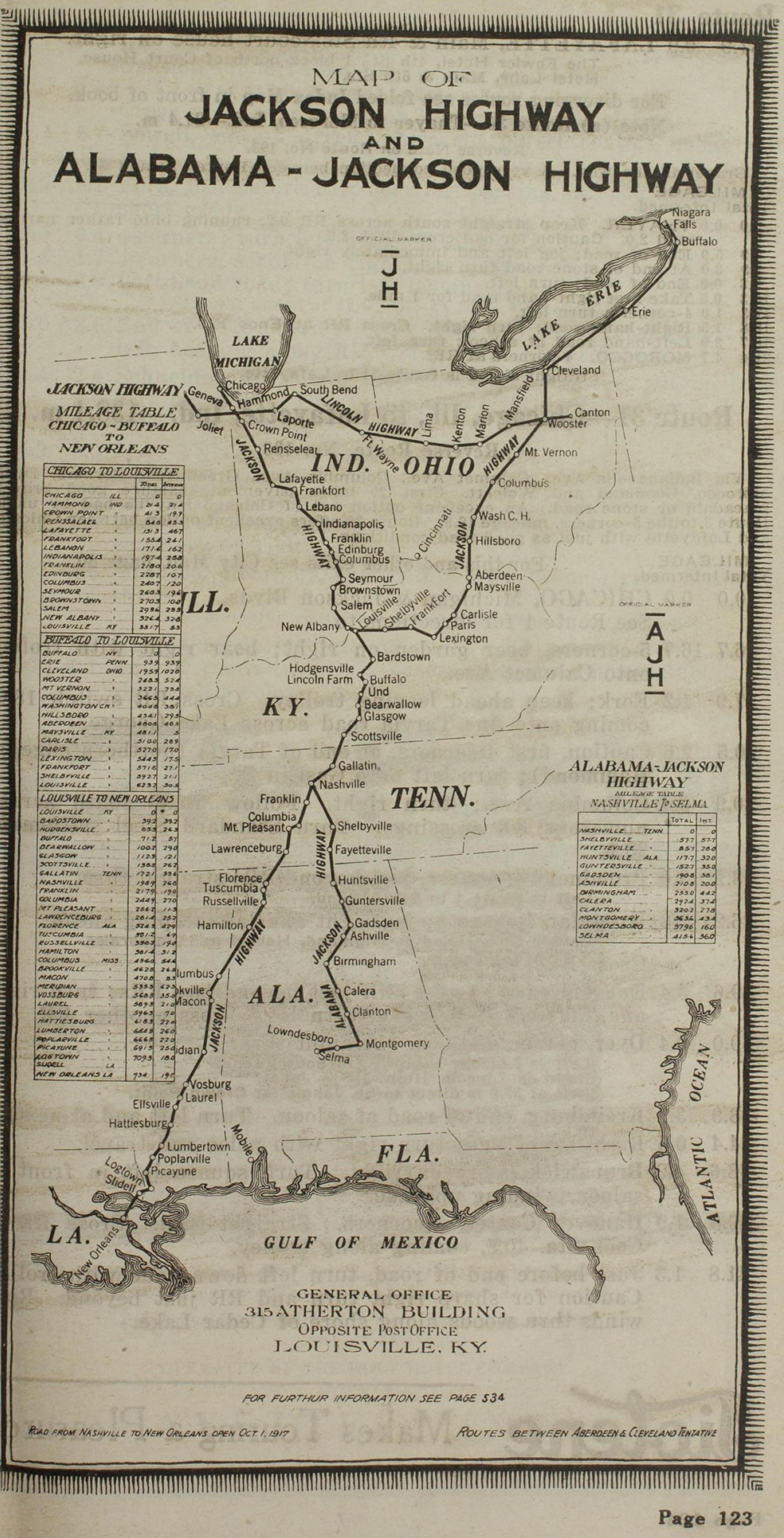
Map from 1917

The original concepts for the route and its name are credited to Alma Rittenberry of Birmingham, Alabama, member of the Birmingham Equal Suffrage Association, the Poetry Society of Alabama, and the United Daughters of the Confederacy. She conceived of the route in 1911.

Peter Lee Atherton was president of the Jackson Highway Project from its conception.

U.S. Highway 31E in Kentucky approximately traces the Jackson Highway's historic route between Louisville and Nashville.
