= Smiths Grove, Kentucky =

- City
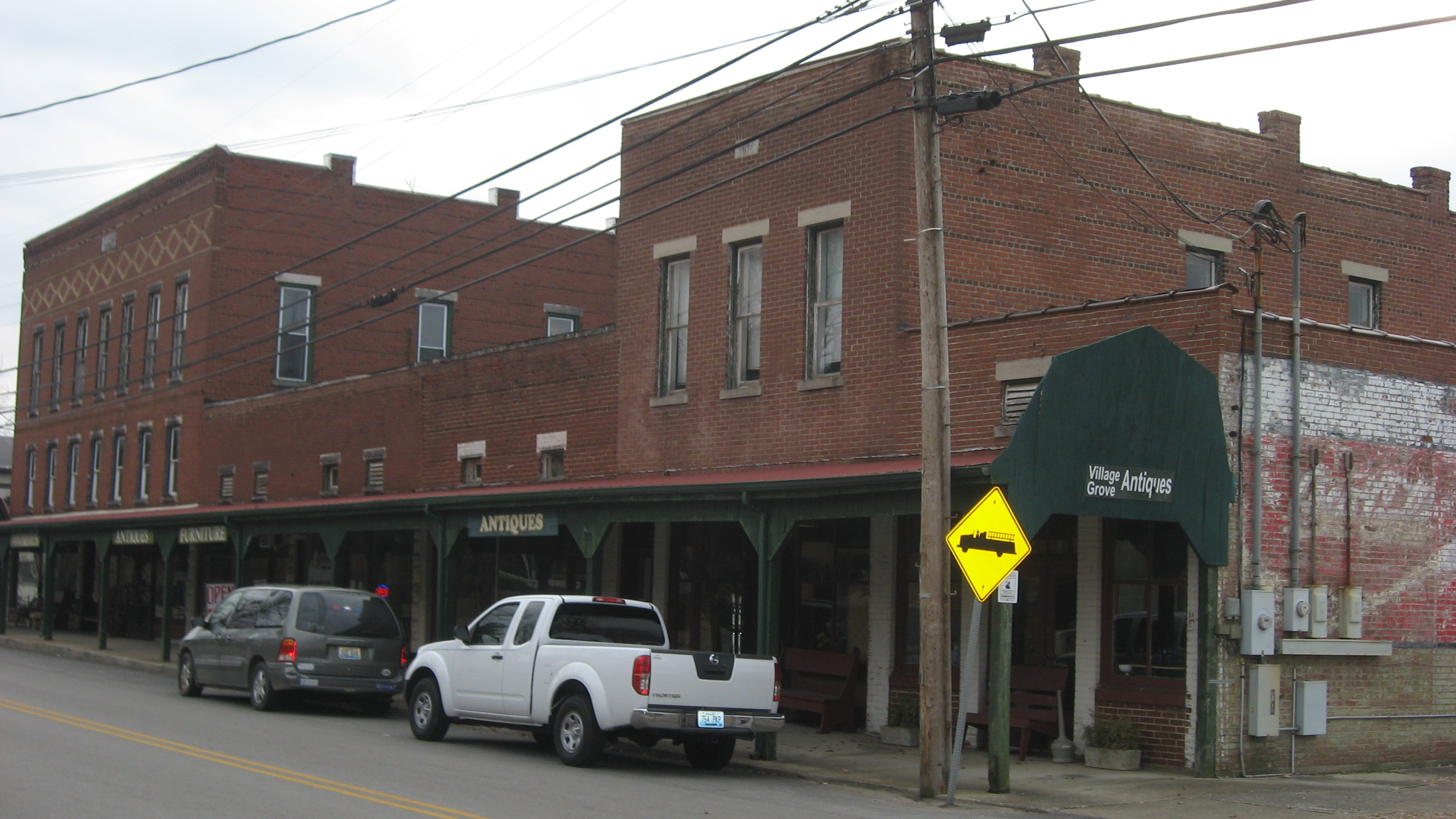
- Main Street

- Location of Smiths Grove in Warren County, Kentucky.
- Coordinates: 37°3′12″N 86°12′27″W
- Country: United States
- State: Kentucky
- County: Warren

Area
  - Total: 0.78 sq mi (2.02 km^{2})
  - Land: 0.78 sq mi (2.02 km^{2})
  - Water: 0 sq mi (0.00 km^{2})
- Elevation: 636 ft (194 m)

Population (2020)
  - Total: 752
  - Density: 964.6/sq mi (372.44/km^{2})
- Time zone: UTC-6 (Central (CST))
  - Summer (DST): UTC-5 (CDT)
- ZIP code: 42171
- Area code: 270
- FIPS code: 21-71454
- GNIS feature ID: 0503812
- Website: smithsgrove.org

Smiths Grove is a home rule-class city in Warren County, Kentucky, United States. The population was 752 as of the 2020 Census. It is included in the Bowling Green, Kentucky Metropolitan Statistical Area.

== Geography ==
Smiths Grove is located at 37°3′12″N 86°12′27″W (37.053448, -86.207569).

According to the United States Census Bureau, the city has a total area of 0.8 square miles (2.1 km^{2}), all land.

== Demographics ==
Historical population
Census	Pop.	Note	%±
1880	388		—
1900	411		—
1910	726		76.6%
1920	815		12.3%
1930	718		−11.9%
1940	699		−2.6%
1950	683		−2.3%
1960	613		−10.2%
1970	756		23.3%
1980	767		1.5%
1990	703		−8.3%
2000	784		11.5%
2010	714		−8.9%
2020	752		5.3%
U.S. Decennial Census

As of the census of 2000, there were 784 people, 298 households, and 228 families residing in the city. The population density was 945.3 inhabitants per square mile (365.0/km^{2}). There were 329 housing units at an average density of 396.7 per square mile (153.2/km^{2}). The racial makeup of the city was 84.82% White, 12.12% African American, 1.91% from other races, and 1.15% from two or more races. Hispanic or Latino of any race were 1.91% of the population.

There were 298 households, out of which 35.9% had children under the age of 18 living with them, 60.4% were married couples living together, 12.4% had a female householder with no husband present, and 23.2% were non-families. 20.8% of all households were made up of individuals, and 12.4% had someone living alone who was 65 years of age or older. The average household size was 2.62 and the average family size was 3.03.

In the city, the population was spread out, with 27.2% under the age of 18, 4.7% from 18 to 24, 31.0% from 25 to 44, 22.2% from 45 to 64, and 14.9% who were 65 years of age or older. The median age was 38 years. For every 100 females, there were 86.2 males. For every 100 females age 18 and over, there were 81.8 males.

The median income for a household in the city was $36,058, and the median income for a family was $43,750. Males had a median income of $32,292 versus $23,365 for females. The per capita income for the city was $19,335. About 7.0% of families and 7.8% of the population were below the poverty line, including 6.5% of those under age 18 and 14.4% of those age 65 or over.

== Education ==
North Warren Elementary, a school in the Warren County Public School System, is located in Smiths Grove. Secondary students in Smiths Grove attend Warren East Middle and High Schools, located west of the town and on the northeastern outskirts of Bowling Green.

Smiths Grove has a lending library, a branch of the Warren County Public Library.

== Transportation ==
Interstate 65 provides direct access to Smiths Grove via the Exit 38 interchange. KY 101 is known locally as Main Street and provides the central road through town.

Downtown Smiths Grove is bisected by a CSX Transportation line, formerly part of the Louisville and Nashville Railroad.
