= Harpeth River =

River in Tennessee, United States

Harpeth
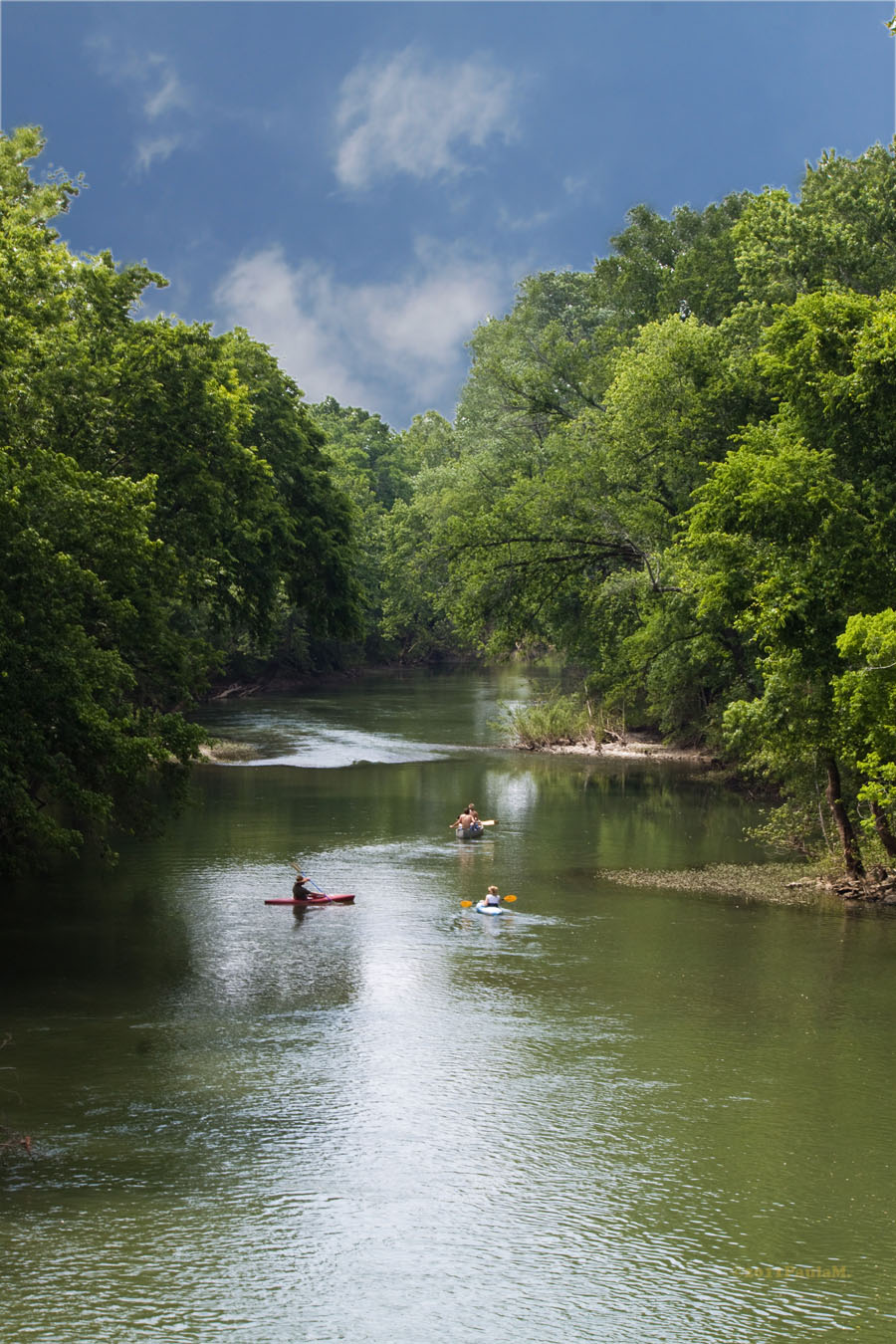

Location
- Country: United States
- State: Tennessee

Physical characteristics
- Mouth: Cumberland River
  - coordinates: 36°18′13″N 87°9′10″W

Basin features
- River system: Cumberland River

The Harpeth River, 115 miles (185 km) long, is one of the major streams of north-central Middle Tennessee, United States, and a major tributary of the Cumberland River. Via the Cumberland and the Ohio Rivers, it is part of the Mississippi River watershed. It is one of the only un-dammed rivers in the state of Tennessee. The lower segment of the Harpeth, including a portion in Bellevue in Nashville, is designated as a "scenic river" under the Tennessee Scenic Rivers Act. In 2020, researchers reported evidence of extant Salamander mussel -- proposed to be listed as an Endangered Species -- on the Harpeth River in Cheatham County, a few miles downstream from Bellevue.

== Course ==
The Harpeth rises in the westernmost part of Rutherford County, Tennessee, just to the east of the community of College Grove in eastern Williamson County. The upper portion of the river has been contaminated to some extent by the operation of a lead smelting plant located near the Kirkland community that recycled used automobile batteries from the 1950s until the 1990s.

The stream flows generally westerly into Franklin, the county seat of Williamson County and suburb of Nashville. The Harpeth is the source of the area's drinking water supply.

At Franklin, the course of the river turns more northwesterly; a few miles northwest of Franklin is the mouth of one of the Harpeth's main tributaries, the West Harpeth, which drains much of the southern portion of Williamson County. Near this site is an antebellum plantation house called "Meeting of the Waters". The river in this area flows quite near the Natchez Trace (the original road of that name, not the modern Parkway named for it, which is several miles distant). The river shortly crosses into Davidson County and receives the flow of the Little Harpeth River, another important tributary. The stream flows near the unincorporated Nashville suburb of Bellevue and shortly after this flows into Cheatham County.

The course of the river in Cheatham County is very meandering. A few miles into Cheatham County, it is joined by another major tributary, the South Harpeth, which drains some of the southwestern portion of Davidson County, southeastern Cheatham County, and a small portion of northwesternmost Williamson County.

In Cheatham County is a remarkable civil engineering feat of the early 19th century. Ironmaster Montgomery Bell built an iron mill near the "Narrows of the Harpeth". At a 7-mile (11 km) horseshoe bend, Bell's workers cut a tunnel through approximately 200 yards (180 m) of solid rock. They used black-powder blasting techniques to build a diversion tunnel to power the mill, which Bell called "Pattison Forge" (often spelled, incorrectly, "Patterson") after his mother's maiden name. Bell was so pleased with his mill that he curtailed some of his other area operations and built a home near the site. Today, the diversion tunnel and some "slag" are about all that remain of his mill operation. The Montgomery Bell Tunnel is a Historic Civil Engineering Landmark.

Also at the "Narrows of the Harpeth" is a prehistoric site known as Mound Bottom, noted for the complex earthwork constructions built from 950 and occupied into the 15th century. This area has several ceremonial and burial earthwork mounds of the Native American Mississippian culture, which preceded those historic tribes of the area known to European encounter. Bell's diversion tunnel and the sheer bluffs nearby are now part of the Narrows of the Harpeth section of Harpeth River State Park, a linear park connecting several natural, historic, and archaeological sites along the lower Harpeth.

From this historic site, the flow becomes generally more northerly, but still greatly meandering. The Harpeth soon forms the line between Dickson and Cheatham counties for the last part of its course. A few miles above the mouth are what are known as the Three Islands; the U.S. Army Corps of Engineers proposed siting a dam near this location on several occasions and did some preliminary study. It was not supported by a favorable cost-benefit ratio and the project was never built. The lower portion of the Harpeth is very popular with canoeists, supporting canoe-outfitting and related businesses.

The mouth of the Harpeth into the Cumberland is near Ashland City, the Cheatham County seat. Near the mouth is a bridge on State Route 49 named in Montgomery Bell's honor. The mouth is just below the Cumberland's Harpeth Island, and is somewhat submerged by the backwaters of the Corps' Cheatham Dam.

After the removal of the lowhead dam in the city of Franklin, the Harpeth is Tennessee's second-longest unimpounded stream (the longest being the Buffalo).

== Name ==
The origin of the name "Harpeth" is controversial. It is often claimed that the river was named for America's first known serial killers, the Harpe brothers, known as "Big Harpe" and "Little Harpe" who were in the area in 1797; this is erroneous since the name existed on maps and documents as early as 1784, predating their fame. A late-18th-century map, published in London, purportedly shows the stream as the "Fairpath"; there is some dissension about whether the name is of Native American origin or perhaps a corruption of the rather common English name "Harper".

Another possible origin for the name of the Harpeth River was presented by Edward D. Hicks in a paper read before the Tennessee Historical Society and published by the “American Historical Magazine” in 1900. Hicks comments upon the influence of classical literature read by learned gentlemen in the 18th century. One source popular among many in the English-speaking world, including America, was the “Spectator” published by Joseph Addison. The “Spectator” contained articles on philosophy, morals and the classics. In publication number 584, printed in 1714, is found the antediluvian love story of Hilpa, Harpath and Shalum. Harpath comes to an untimely end drowning in a river as he attempted to cross it. “The river is called to this day from his name, who perished in it, the river Harpath…”. Hicks does not offer the claim that this is the definitive origin of the name however he does say it is “certainly appropriate…I submit it as the most probable and ingenious theory I can suggest.” Early 18th-century maps including Matthew Carey's 1795 Map of Tennessee as well as that of John Reid, Imlay's American Topography, Arrowsmith, and Stockdale use the spelling Harpath River which differs from the modern spelling of “Harpeth”. The exception is John Russell's 1794 map of the Southwest Territory published in London circa 1794. The earliest known written reference is found in the diary of John Lipscomb. His July 1784 entry mentions the “Harpath” river. In addition, contemporary historian Virginia Bowman gives credence to Hicks' theory in her comprehensive book on early sites and homes of Williamson County, Tennessee.

There is no dispute that the title of the song "Harper Valley PTA" by Tom T. Hall is derived from this stream, indirectly. Hall, long an area resident, says that the song's name derives from Harpeth Valley Elementary School in Davidson County in Bellevue, but he also states that the song was definitely not based on any occurrence there; rather, he simply liked the sound of it.

== River access ==
Common put-ins/take-outs:

Kingston Springs, TN - An area for canoe access in Cheatham County, west of Nashville.

- Turkey Creek - approx. 438 E. Kingston Springs Rd.
- Kingston Springs City Park - 589 Park Street, Kingston Springs, TN 37082
- Gossett Tract -1230 Cedar Hill Road, Kingston Springs, TN 37082
- Narrows of the Harpeth - 1254 Narrow of the Harpeth Road, Kingston Springs, TN 37082
- Harris Street Bridge Canoe Access - 1672 Cedar Hill Road, Kingston Springs, TN 37082
- Hwy 70 Canoe Access - 1007 Cedar Hill Road / 1294 Hwy 70, Kingston Springs, 37082

Franklin, TN

- Fieldstone Park - approx. 2194 Fieldstone Pkwy.
- Meeting of the Waters - approx. 3176 Del Rio Pike
- The Rope Swing - Old Natchez Trace
- Moran Rd - Moran Rd
- Ladd Park Harpeth River Canoe Access - 5007 Ryecroft Ln

Bellevue/West Davidson County, TN - An area for canoe access in Davidson County, west of Nashville.

- Hwy 100 Canoe Access - 7701 Hwy 100, Nashville, TN 37221
- Coley Davis Canoe Launch - 7836-7946 Coley Davis Rd., Nashville, TN 37221
- Newsom's Mill - 8729 Newsom Station Road, Nashville, TN 37221
- Hidden Lake - 7851 McCrory Lane, Nashville, TN 37221

== See also ==
- List of rivers of Tennessee
