= Harpeth Island =

Island in Tennessee, US

Coordinates: 36.294°N 87.115°W

- Interactive map of Harpeth Island

Geography
- Location: Cumberland River, Cheatham County, Tennessee
- Area: 20 acres (8.1 ha)

Administration
- United States

Harpeth Island is an island in the Cumberland River in Cheatham County, Tennessee, US. It is the largest river island between the Old Hickory Dam and the Cheatham Dam. It is located near Ashland City, Tennessee. It spans 20 acres within the Cheatham Lake Wildlife Management Area, and it is owned by the United States Army Corps of Engineers. The island was surveyed by the Army Corps in 1930. It is a walk-in area for fishing on Mondays, Tuesdays and Fridays.

== History ==
In 1818, the General Jackson unloaded at Harpeth Island due to low water while attempting to make the first steamboat journey up the Cumberland River to Nashville, Tennessee. One year later in 1819, the General Jackson again intended to unload at Harpeth Island, but an unexpected increase in water levels allowed the boat to continue upriver and become the first steamboat to reach Nashville.
