= Monthaven =

Historic house in Tennessee, United States

- U.S. National Register of Historic Places
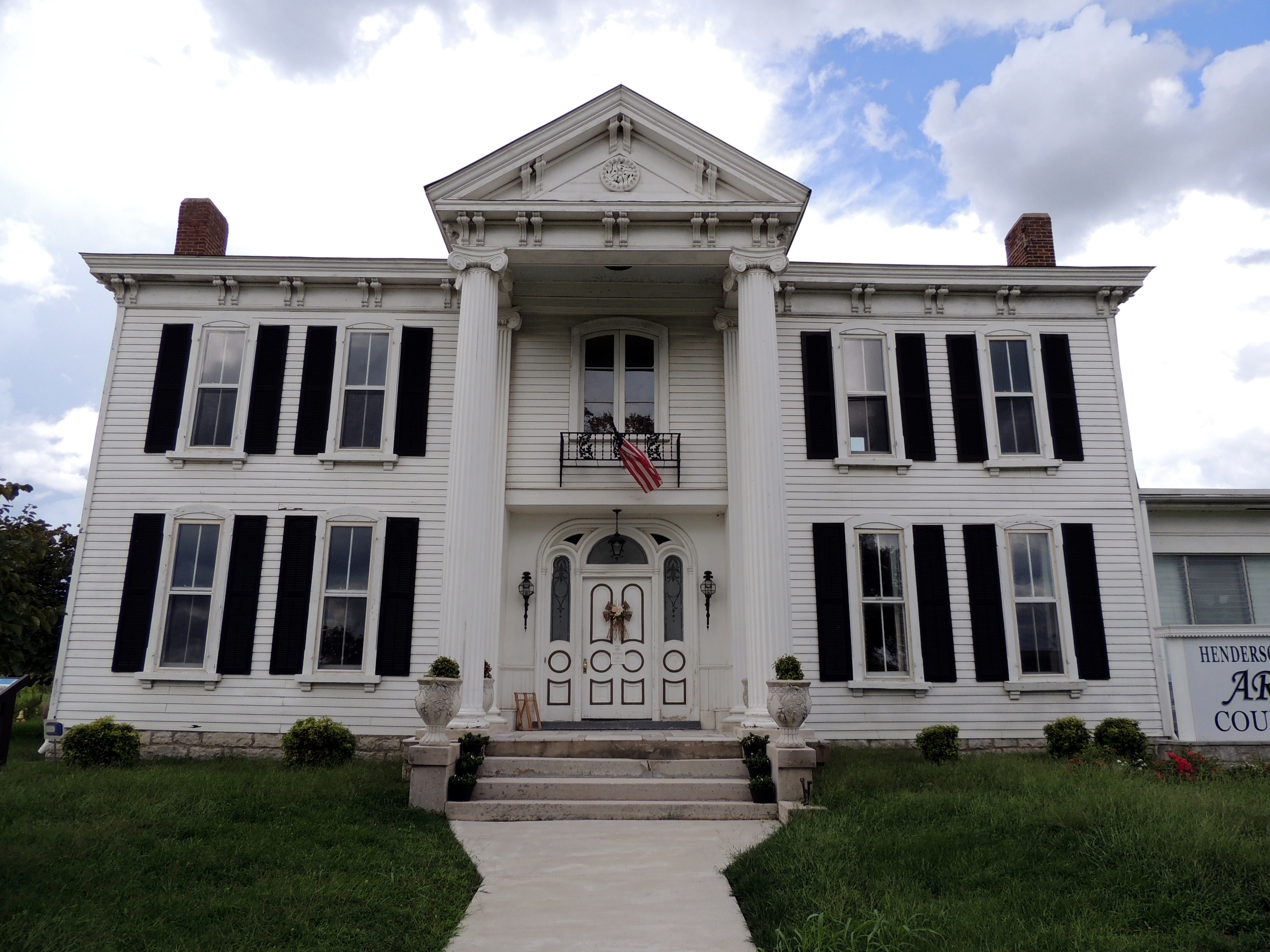

- Location within Tennessee Location within the United States
- Location: 1154 W. Main St.
- Nearest city: Hendersonville, Tennessee
- Coordinates: 36°18′38.4″N 86°39′45.2″W
- Built: 1860
- Architectural style: Greek Revival, Late Victorian
- NRHP reference No.: 82004061
- Added to NRHP: 1982

Monthaven, also known as the Leonard B. Fite House, is a historic home in Hendersonville, Tennessee and is on the National Historic Register. It was built around 1860 and used as a field hospital during the American Civil War. A few skirmishes occurred on the property as well. The historic building is now home to galleries and offices of the Hendersonville Arts Council.

During its time, Monthaven was considered a neighbor to Rock Castle and The Hermitage, both miles away.

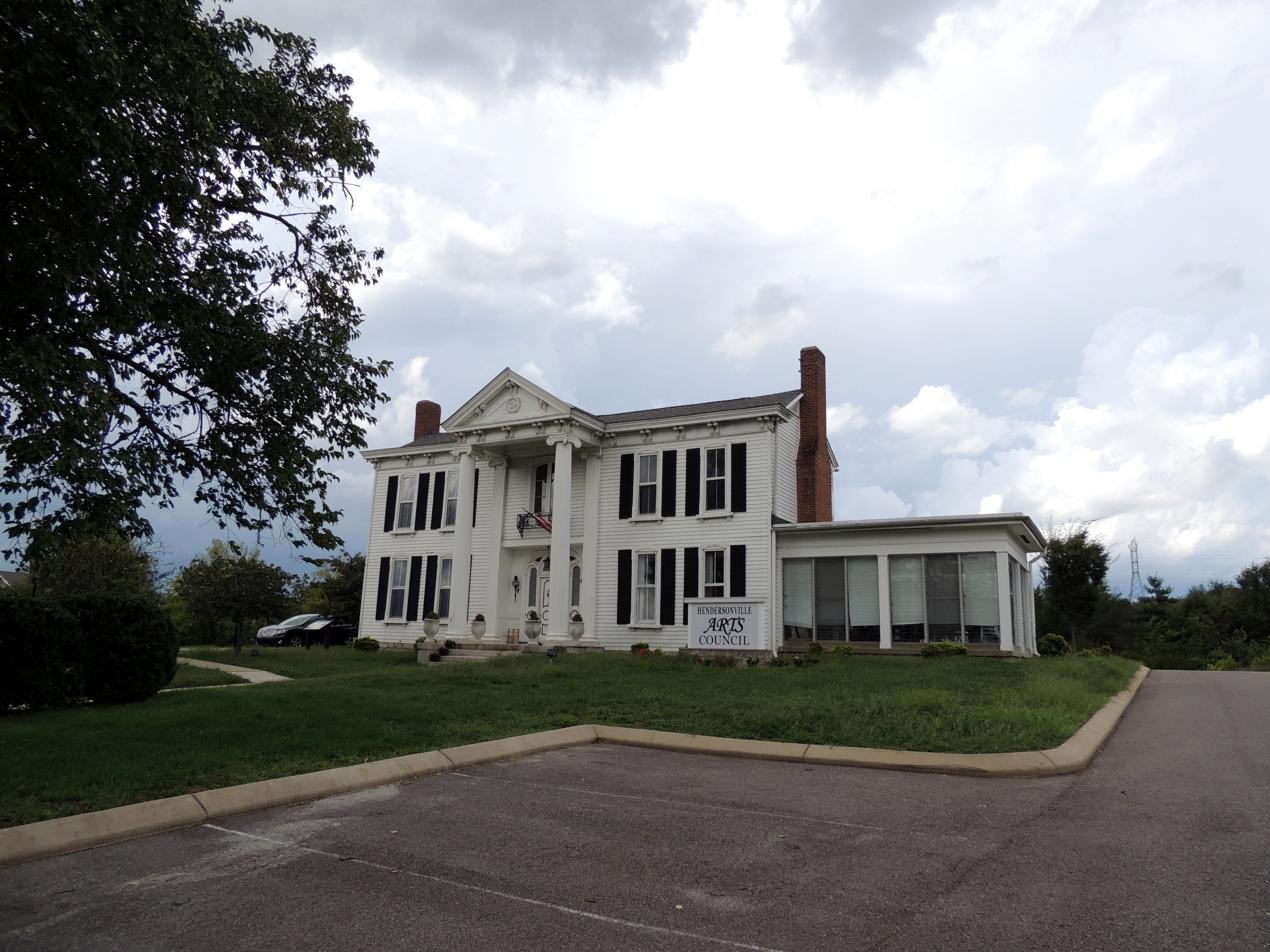
A full view of the Monthaven property
