= Hendersonville, Tennessee =

City in Tennessee, United States

- Satellite City
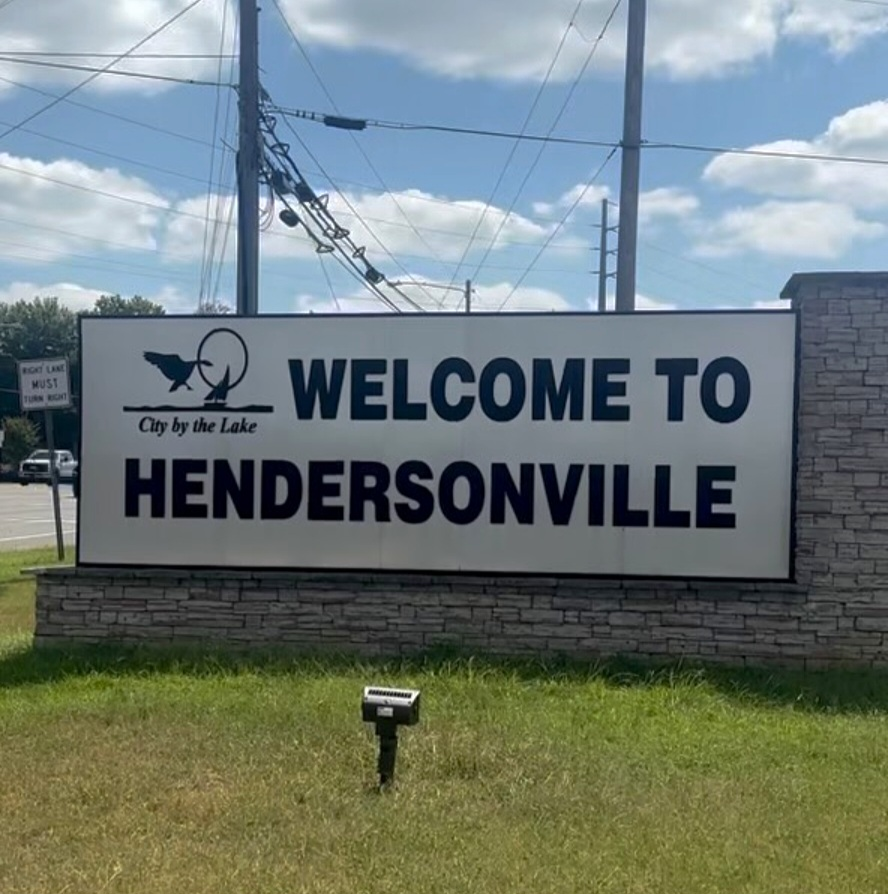
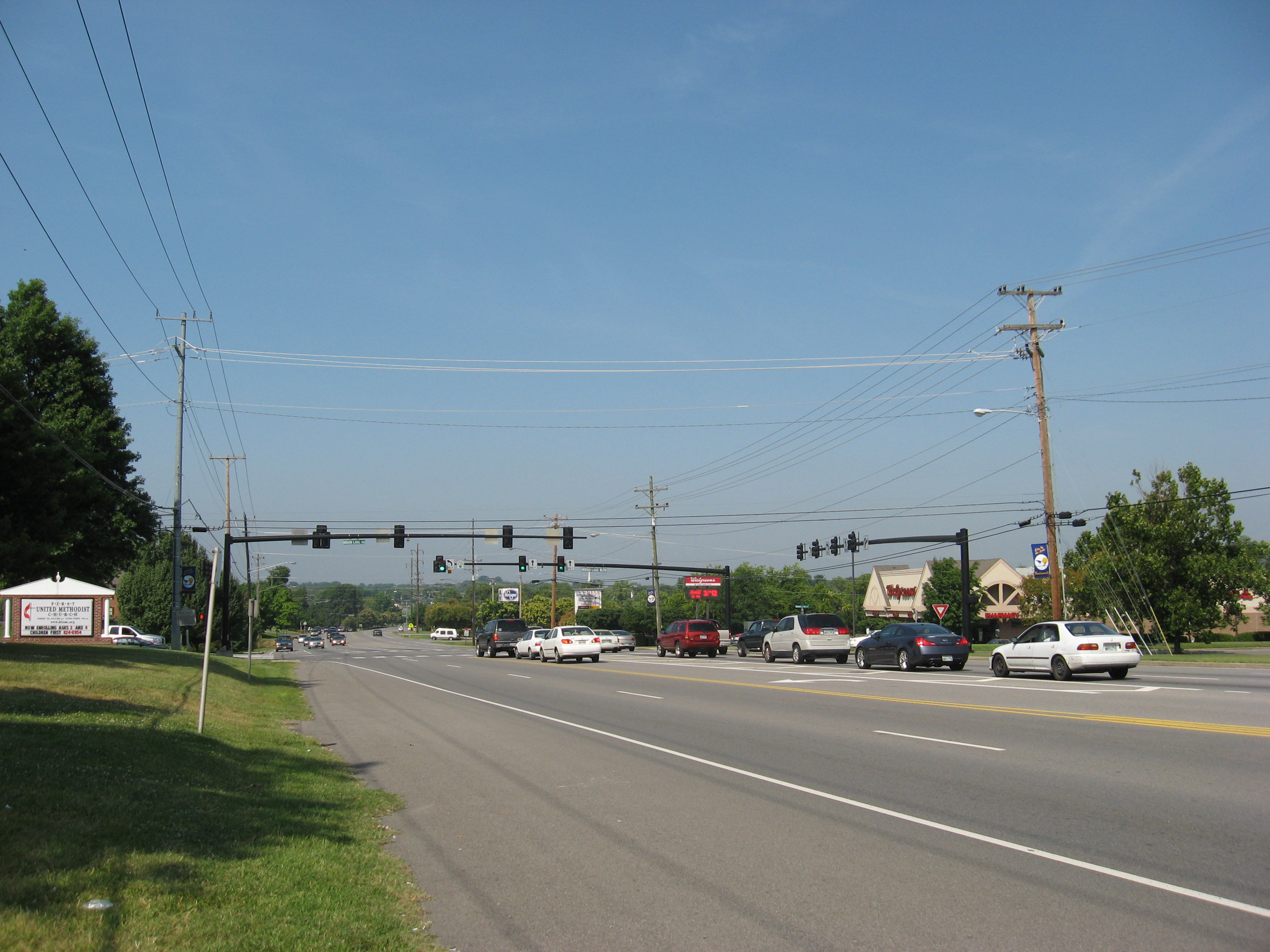
- Hendersonville welcome sign Downtown Hendersonville

- Flag Seal Logo of Hendersonville, Tennessee.png
- Motto: "The City by the Lake"
- Location of Hendersonville in Sumner County, Tennessee (left) and of Sumner County in Tennessee (right)
- Coordinates: 36°18′17″N 86°37′12″W
- Country: United States
- State: Tennessee
- County: Sumner
- Settled: 1784
- Incorporated: 1901
- Named for: William Henderson (early settler)

Government
  - Mayor: Jamie Clary

Area
  - Total: 38.18 sq mi (98.89 km^{2})
  - Land: 31.68 sq mi (82.04 km^{2})
  - Water: 6.51 sq mi (16.85 km^{2})
- Elevation: 482 ft (147 m)

Population (2020)
  - Total: 61,753
  - Estimate (2024): 63,947 ▲
  - Density: 1,949.6/sq mi (752.73/km^{2})
- Time zone: UTC−6 (Central (CST))
  - Summer (DST): UTC−5 (CDT)
- ZIP Codes: 37075, 37077
- Area code(s): 615, 629
- FIPS code: 47-33280
- GNIS feature ID: 1287389
- Website: https://www.hvilletn.org/

Hendersonville is the most populous city in Sumner County, Tennessee, on Old Hickory Lake. As of the 2020 census the city's population was 61,753. Hendersonville is the fourth-most populous city in the Nashville metropolitan area after Nashville, Murfreesboro, and Franklin and the 10th largest in Tennessee. Hendersonville is located 18 miles (29 km) northeast of downtown Nashville. The city was settled around 1784 by Daniel Smith, whose house Rock Castle, is maintained as a historic site.

The city is named for William Henderson, the first postmaster.

== History ==
In 1784 Daniel Smith received a land grant from the state of North Carolina in payment for surveying Middle Tennessee. (North Carolina at the time claimed its boundaries extended to this territory across the Appalachian Mountains.) He began work on his house later known as Rock Castle, but it was not completed until 1796. Due to his surveying trips, he frequently was gone on long journeys, and his wife supervised much of the construction.

In 1790, William Henderson settled in Sumner County and later became the namesake of the town. It was a trading center for the county, which was devoted to the production of tobacco and hemp as commodity crops, and blood livestock: both horses and cattle. During the Civil War, Monthaven was used by Union troops as a field hospital, as they occupied Middle Tennessee from 1862 to 1870. In the late 20th century, this historic home was listed on the National Register of Historic Places. Even before the Emancipation Proclamation of January 1863, refugee slaves with their families found their way to Union lines in the state in search of freedom. The Army established a contraband camp near Hendersonville, to offer shelter to the freedmen, help them with supplies and food, and sign them up to work for wages for the Army, often building defenses. Missionary societies helped teach both adults and children among the slaves.

The small city was not incorporated until 1969, as the area continued to be rural and devoted to agriculture and related activities. It then had roughly 250 residents and was led by L.H. "Dink" Newman. Since the late 20th and early 21st centuries, it has grown to become the largest city in the county.

With the completion of the Old Hickory Dam and an associated lake in 1954, Hendersonville started to develop more rapidly. The lake attracted sportsmen and people seeking recreation; some became residents or acquired second homes here. Since the late 20th century, it has become the most-populous city of Sumner County, and one of the most populous suburbs of Nashville, along with Franklin and Murfreesboro.

On December 9, 2023, a tornado hit the city and caused major damage. The tornado killed 3 people in Madison, Tennessee, and left countless others injured. The National Weather Service in Nashville issued a Tornado Emergency for Hendersonville and Gallatin, Tennessee only a few minutes before the tornado struck.

== Geography ==
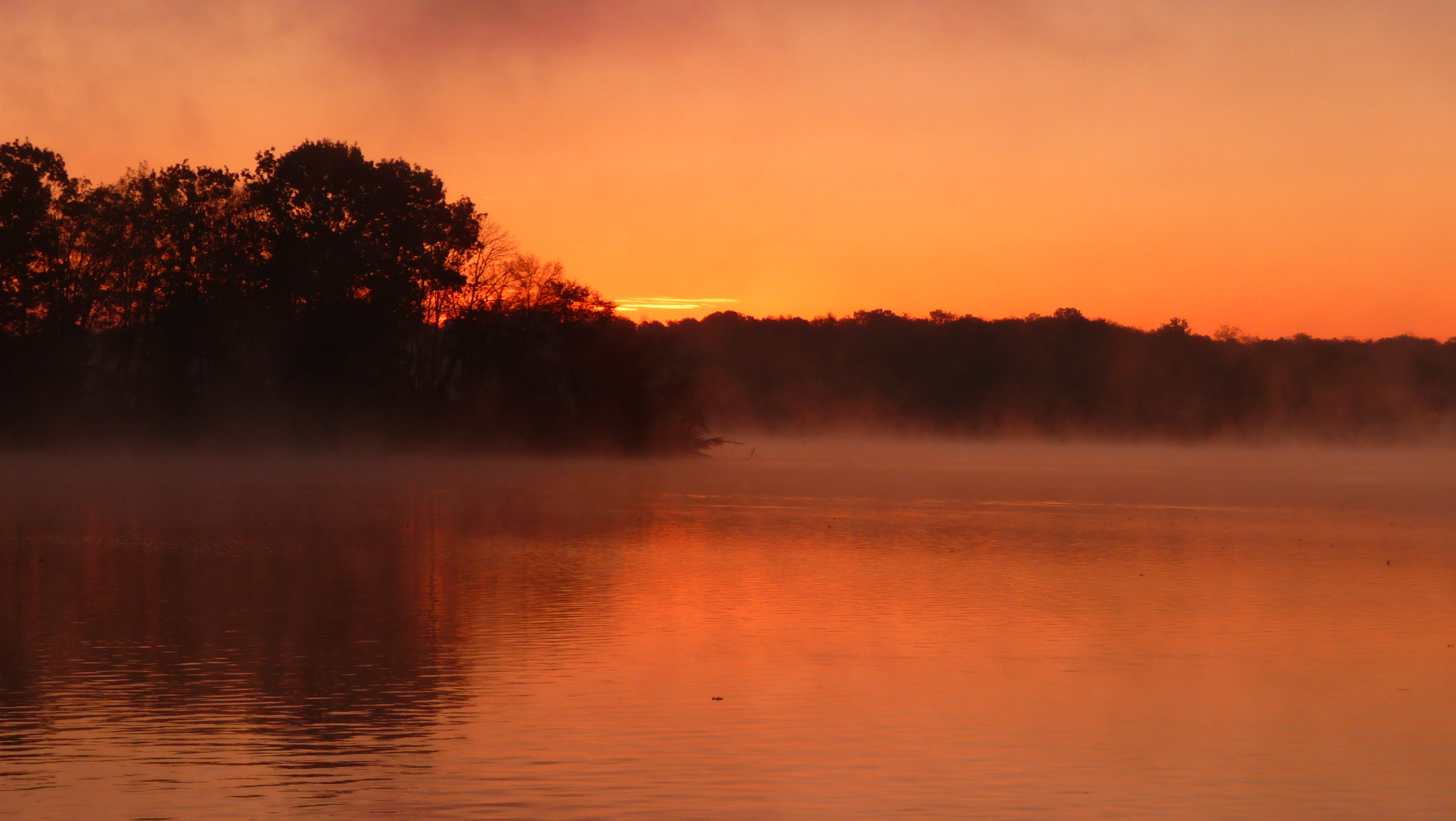
Sunrise on Old Hickory Lake in Hendersonville

According to the United States Census Bureau, the city has a total area of 32.9 square miles (85 km^{2}), of which 27.3 square miles (71 km^{2}) is land and 5.6 square miles (15 km^{2}) (16.93%) is water, mostly parts of the Cumberland River.

Hendersonville is served by the freeway Tennessee State Route 386 and its parallel surface road U.S. Route 31E.

=== Climate ===
Hendersonville's climate classifications are Köppen "Cfa" and Trewartha "DOak" due to very hot summers (three to four months average over 71.6 °F (22.0 °C)), mild winters (all months average over 32.0 °F (0.0 °C)), and mediocre (4–7 months) growing seasons (in this case seven months average over 50.0 °F (10.0 °C)).

Climate data for Old Hickory Dam, TN (1991–2020 normals, extremes 1965–present)
Month	Jan	Feb	Mar	Apr	May	Jun	Jul	Aug	Sep	Oct	Nov	Dec	Year
Record high °F (°C)	73 (23)	79 (26)	86 (30)	91 (33)	94 (34)	106 (41)	106 (41)	105 (41)	101 (38)	96 (36)	87 (31)	76 (24)	106 (41)
Mean maximum °F (°C)	67 (19)	72 (22)	79 (26)	86 (30)	91 (33)	96 (36)	97 (36)	97 (36)	95 (35)	88 (31)	77 (25)	69 (21)	99 (37)
Mean daily maximum °F (°C)	47.0 (8.3)	51.4 (10.8)	60.5 (15.8)	71.3 (21.8)	78.9 (26.1)	86.1 (30.1)	89.9 (32.2)	90.2 (32.3)	83.4 (28.6)	72.1 (22.3)	60.1 (15.6)	50.2 (10.1)	70.1 (21.2)
Daily mean °F (°C)	37.1 (2.8)	40.7 (4.8)	48.6 (9.2)	58.2 (14.6)	66.9 (19.4)	75.1 (23.9)	78.5 (25.8)	78.6 (25.9)	71.6 (22.0)	59.7 (15.4)	47.9 (8.8)	39.5 (4.2)	58.5 (14.7)
Mean daily minimum °F (°C)	27.2 (−2.7)	30.0 (−1.1)	36.8 (2.7)	45.0 (7.2)	54.9 (12.7)	64.1 (17.8)	67.0 (19.4)	67.0 (19.4)	59.8 (15.4)	47.2 (8.4)	35.7 (2.1)	28.8 (−1.8)	47.0 (8.3)
Mean minimum °F (°C)	10 (−12)	13 (−11)	21 (−6)	31 (−1)	40 (4)	54 (12)	59 (15)	58 (14)	48 (9)	33 (1)	22 (−6)	17 (−8)	9 (−13)
Record low °F (°C)	−10 (−23)	0 (−18)	8 (−13)	21 (−6)	34 (1)	47 (8)	52 (11)	54 (12)	36 (2)	26 (−3)	14 (−10)	6 (−14)	−10 (−23)
Average precipitation inches (mm)	3.73 (95)	4.26 (108)	4.64 (118)	4.74 (120)	4.55 (116)	3.76 (96)	4.05 (103)	3.38 (86)	3.70 (94)	3.33 (85)	3.35 (85)	4.44 (113)	47.93 (1,217)
Average snowfall inches (cm)	0.6 (1.5)	0.3 (0.76)	0.2 (0.51)	0 (0)	0 (0)	0 (0)	0 (0)	0 (0)	0 (0)	0 (0)	0 (0)	0.1 (0.25)	1.2 (3.0)
Source: https://www.weather.gov/wrh/climate?wfo=ohx

== Demographics ==
Historical population
Census	Pop.	Note	%±
1880	170		—
1890	215		26.5%
1970	412		—
1980	26,561		6,346.8%
1990	32,188		21.2%
2000	40,620		26.2%
2010	51,372		26.5%
2020	61,753		20.2%
2024 (est.)	63,947		3.6%

=== Racial and ethnic composition ===
Racial composition as of the 2020 census
Race	Number	Percent
White	48,657	78.8%
Black or African American	5,367	8.7%
American Indian and Alaska Native	210	0.3%
Asian	1,312	2.1%
Native Hawaiian and Other Pacific Islander	54	0.1%
Some other race	1,558	2.5%
Two or more races	4,595	7.4%
Hispanic or Latino (of any race)	3,968	6.4%

=== 2020 census ===
As of the 2020 census, Hendersonville had a population of 61,753 residents in 23,697 households and 14,788 families.

The median age was 38.9 years, 23.8% of residents were under the age of 18, and 16.0% were 65 years of age or older; for every 100 females there were 92.7 males, and for every 100 females age 18 and over there were 89.5 males.

Of the 23,697 households, 34.3% had children under the age of 18 living in them, 53.3% were married-couple households, 15.0% were households with a male householder and no spouse or partner present, and 25.7% were households with a female householder and no spouse or partner present; 24.0% of all households were made up of individuals and 9.3% had someone living alone who was 65 years of age or older.

There were 24,963 housing units, of which 5.1% were vacant, with a homeowner vacancy rate of 1.5% and a rental vacancy rate of 7.1%.

99.7% of residents lived in urban areas while 0.3% lived in rural areas.

=== 2010 census ===
As of the 2010 United States census, there was a population of 51,372, with 20,111 households and 14,239 families residing in the city. The population density was 1,881.76 persons per square mile, and the housing unit density was 736.67 units per square mile. The racial makeup of the city was 88.64% White, 6.28% Black or African American, 1.58% Asian, 0.33% Native American, 0.07% Pacific Islander, 1.21% from other races, and 1.89% from two or more races. Those of Hispanic or Latino origins were 3.62% of the population.

Of the 20,111 households, 33.47% had children under the age of 18 living in them, 55.71% were married couples living together, 3.92% had a male householder with no wife present, 11.17% had a female householder with no husband present, and 29.20% were non-families. 24.35% of all households were made up of individuals, and 8.77% had someone living alone who was 65 years of age or older. The average household size was 2.55 and the average family size was 3.04.

Of the 51,372 residents, 25.80% were under the age of 18, 61.41% were between the ages of 18 and 64, and 12.79% were 65 years of age or older. The median age was 38.5 years. 51.71% of the residents were female and 48.29% were male.

The median household income in the city was $62,627 and the median family income was $74,353. Males had a median income of $54,016 versus $34,996 for females. The per capita income for the city was $30,000. About 6.5% of families and 8.9% of the population were below the poverty line, including 13.0% of those under the age of 18 and 7.6% of those age 65 and over.

=== 2000 census ===
As of the census of 2000, there was a population of 40,620, with 15,823 households and 11,566 families residing in the city. The population density was 1,486.4 inhabitants per square mile (573.9/km^{2}). There were 16,507 housing units at an average density of 604.0 per square mile (233.2/km^{2}). The racial makeup of the city was 92.93% White, 4.12% African American, 0.27% Native American, 1.10% Asian, 0.03% Pacific Islander, 0.65% from other races, and 0.90% from two or more races. Hispanic or Latino of any race were 1.71% of the population.

There were 15,823 households, out of which 35.7% had children under the age of 18 living with them, 59.3% were married couples living together, 10.7% had a female householder with no husband present, and 26.9% were non-families. 22.3% of all households were made up of individuals, and 6.5% had someone living alone who was 65 years of age or older. The average household size was 2.55 and the average family size was 3.00.

In the city, the population was spread out, with 25.8% under the age of 18, 7.8% from 18 to 24, 31.5% from 25 to 44, 24.8% from 45 to 64, and 10.2% who were 65 years of age or older. The median age was 36 years. For every 100 females, there were 94.9 males. For every 100 females age 18 and over, there were 90.3 males.

The median income for a household in the city was $50,108, and the median income for a family was $57,625. Males had a median income of $40,823 versus $27,771 for females. The per capita income for the city was $24,165. About 5.2% of families and 6.2% of the population were below the poverty line, including 8.2% of those under age 18 and 7.7% of those age 65 or over.

== Economy ==
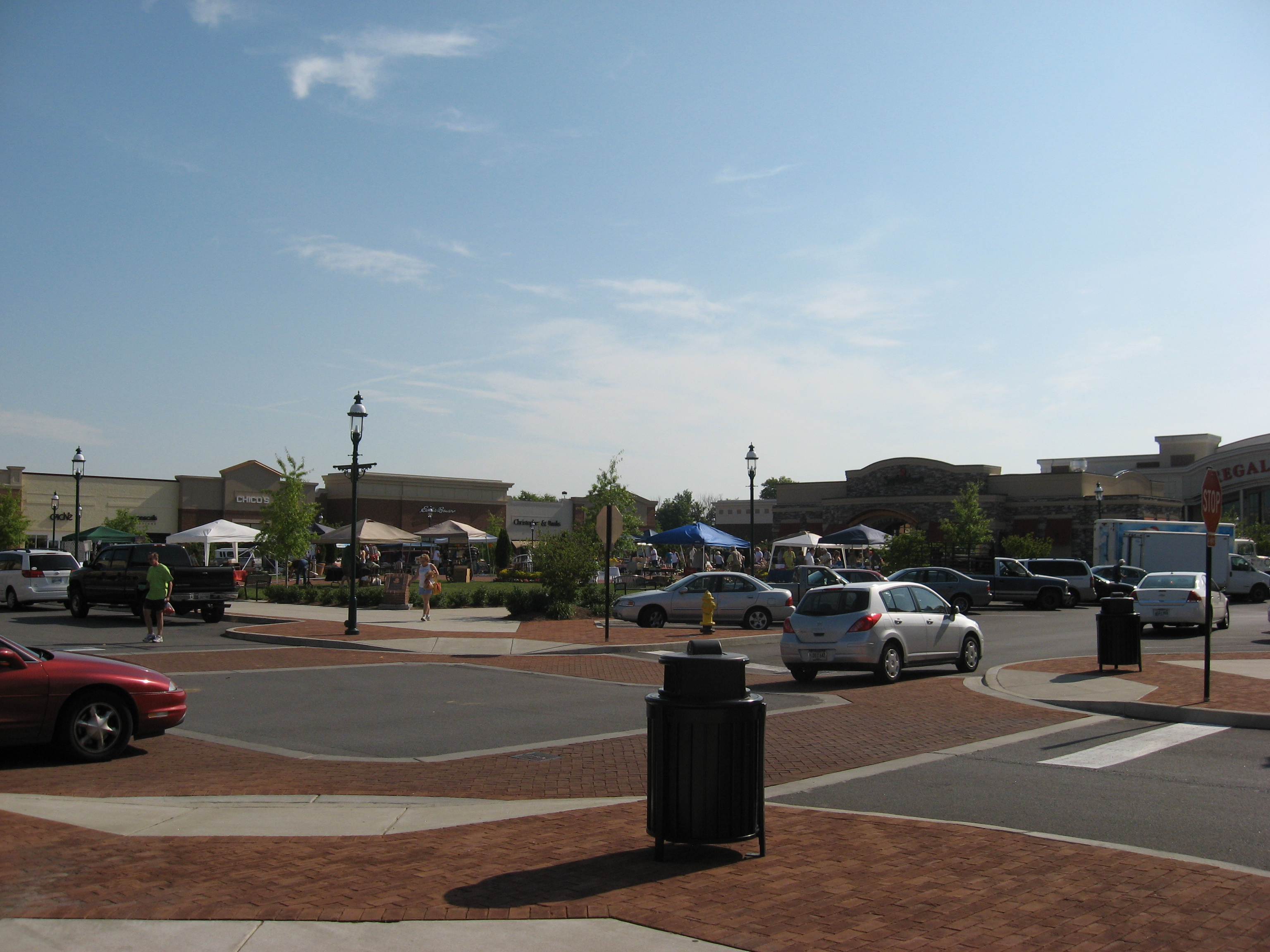
Indian Lake Village in 2009

Indian Lake Village is a mixed-use development in Hendersonville. It is located along Indian Lake Boulevard and is anchored by the Streets of Indian Lake, an outdoor lifestyle center. The Village is an open-air shopping center that includes national and local retailers, restaurants, and a cinema. The area also contains residential units, professional offices, and medical facilities, and is regarded as one of Hendersonville's main commercial districts. The Streets of Indian Lake hosts community events throughout the year, including a farmers market and a summer concert series.

== Arts and culture ==
The Hendersonville Arts Council is a non-profit organization located in Monthaven Mansion. The mansion was built before the Civil War and was used as a hospital during several battles. It is listed on the National Register of Historic Places, the Tennessee Civil War Trail, and Ring of Fire, and exhibits visual art, music, workshops, wine tastings, crafts, culinary demonstrations, performances, and cultural activities.

The Hendersonville Performing Arts Center is a non-profit theater founded in 1996.

== Government ==
Hendersonville is governed by a board of 12 aldermen and a mayor, known as the Board of Mayor and Aldermen (BOMA). The aldermen are elected by district for staggered terms of four years. The mayor is elected once every four years by the whole city.

== Education ==
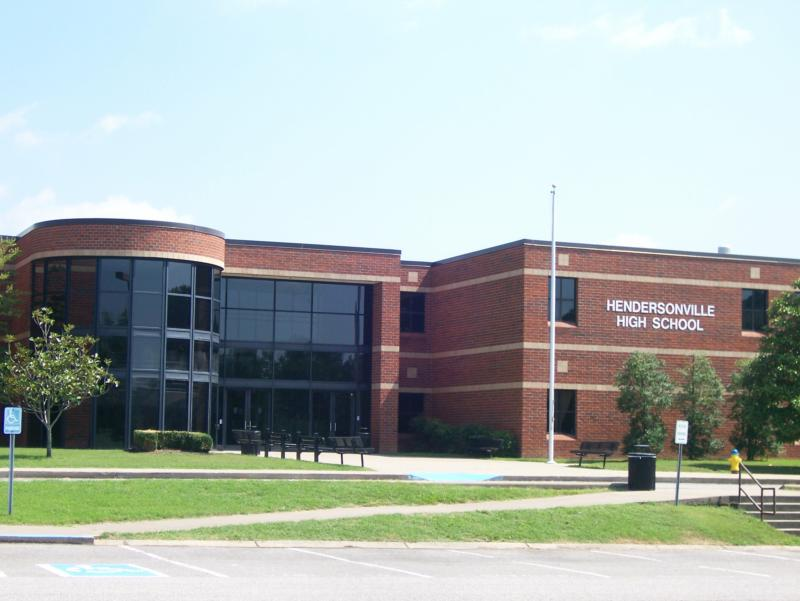
Hendersonville High School

=== Public schools ===
Hendersonville's schools are governed by the Sumner County Schools. Schools located in Hendersonville include:

- Anderson Elementary
- Beech Elementary
- Beech High School
- Dr. William Burrus Elementary at Drakes Creek
- Ellis Middle School
- Gene Brown Elementary School
- George Whitten Elementary
- Hawkins Middle School
- Hendersonville High School
- T. W. Hunter Middle School
- Indian Lake Elementary
- Knox Doss at Drakes Creek Middle School
- Lakeside Park Elementary
- Merrol Hyde Magnet School
- Nannie Berry Elementary School
- Walton Ferry Elementary School

=== Private schools ===
- Hendersonville Christian Academy (pre-K–12)
- Pope John Paul II High School

== Notable people ==
- Gary Allan, country singer
- Duane Allen, country singer, member of The Oak Ridge Boys
- David Archuleta, pop singer
- Mae Boren Axton, songwriter
- Max T. Barnes, singer, songwriter, producer
- James O. Bass, Tennessee state legislator and lawyer
- Josh Berry, NASCAR driver for Wood Brothers Racing
- Joe Bonsall, country singer, member of The Oak Ridge Boys
- Young Buck, (real name: David Brown), hip hop artist
- Jesse Brand, songwriter, actor
- Jo-Ann Campbell, 1950s rock artist married to Troy Seals
- Johnny Cash, country singer
- June Carter Cash, country singer
- Maybelle Carter American folk & country singer (The Carter Family)
- Kelly Clarkson and Brandon Blackstock
- Easton Corbin, country singer
- Zac Curtis, MLB pitcher
- Jimmy Fortune, country singer
- William Lee Golden, country singer, member of The Oak Ridge Boys
- Harold Hunter, basketball coach, first African American to sign a contract with the National Basketball Association
- Jalen Hurd, former running back for the Tennessee Volunteers football team, former wide receiver for the Baylor Bears football team. Drafted in the 2019 NFL draft 3rd round 67th pick by the San Francisco 49ers
- Jeff Jarrett, professional wrestler and founder of Nashville-based Total Nonstop Action Wrestling
- Karen Jarrett, formerly Karen Angle, former wife of Kurt Angle and current wife of Jeff Jarrett
- John Jenkins, NBA player
- Bob Luman, country singer
- Barbara Mandrell, country singer and entertainer
- Ronnie McDowell, country singer
- Bill Monroe, bluegrass originator
- Lennon Murphy, singer-songwriter
- Josef Newgarden, IndyCar Series racing driver, 2017 and 2019 series champion and back to back 2023-24 Indianapolis 500 winner
- Roy Orbison, rock singer
- Sonny Osborne, bluegrass banjo player
- Caleb Patterson-Sewell, soccer player and sports executive
- Luther Perkins, country guitarist
- Rachael Price, jazz vocalist
- Thomas Rhett, Country singer
- Tommy Rich, wrestler (former NWA World Champion)
- John Rogan, second tallest verified human being with 8 ft 8 in (2.64m)
- Johnny Russell, country singer, songwriter
- Dan Seals, country musician, member of England Dan and John Ford Coley
- Troy Seals, country music songwriter
- Ed Sheeran, singer, songwriter
- Jean Shepard, country singer
- Ricky Skaggs, country singer
- Connie Smith, country singer
- Phil Stacey, country singer, American Idol season 6 finalist
- Richard Sterban, country singer, member of The Oak Ridge Boys
- Marty Stuart, country singer
- Taylor Swift, country and pop singer-songwriter, 14-time Grammy Award winner
- Golden Tate, Detroit Lions wide receiver
- Merle Travis, singer/guitarist
- Conway Twitty, country singer
- Larry Underwood, writer, actor, horror host (as Dr. Gangrene)
- Greg Upchurch, drummer, Grammy Award winner, 3 Doors Down
- Paul Yandell, guitarist, longtime stage sidekick of Chet Atkins

== Sister city ==
Tsuru, Yamanashi, Japan

== See also ==
- Hendersonville Presbyterian Church
