= Old Hickory Lake =

Reservoir of the Cumberland River in Tennessee, United States

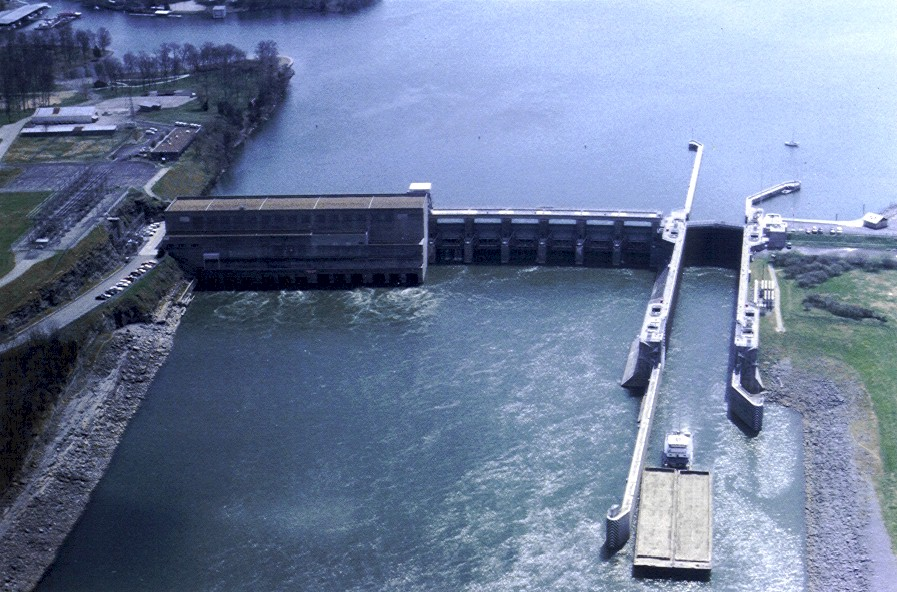
- Old Hickory Lock and Dam

- Location within Tennessee Location within the United States
- Location: Davidson / Sumner / Wilson / Trousdale / Smith counties, Tennessee
- Coordinates: 36°19′N 86°29′W
- Lake type: reservoir
- Primary inflows: Cumberland River
- Primary outflows: Cumberland River
- Basin countries: United States
- Max. length: 97.3 mi (156.6 km)
- Surface area: 22,500 acres (91 km^{2})
- Surface elevation: 445 ft (136 m)

Old Hickory Lake is a reservoir in north central Tennessee. It is formed by the Old Hickory Lock and Dam (36°17′48″N 86°39′20″W), located on the Cumberland River at mile 216.2 in Sumner and Davidson counties, approximately 25 miles (40 km) upstream from Nashville.

The city of Hendersonville is situated on the northern shoreline of the lake, and Old Hickory, a portion of Metropolitan Nashville-Davidson County, is located on the southern side of the lake, just upstream of the lock and dam. The lake extends 97.3 miles (156.6 km) upstream to Cordell Hull Lock and Dam (36°17′25″N 85°56′36″W), near Carthage, Tennessee. The dam and lake are named after President Andrew Jackson (nicknamed "Old Hickory"), who lived in the vicinity, at The Hermitage.

The lock, dam, powerhouse and lake are operated and supervised by U.S. Army Corps of Engineers staff under the direction of the District Engineer at Nashville. Construction started in January 1952, and dam closure was completed in June 1954.

Historic Rock Castle, completed in 1796, is the former home of pioneer Daniel Smith. He is known for his contributions in settling Hendersonville in the early nineteenth century. The lake now borders this property.

Old Hickory Lake is a mainstream storage impoundment on the Cumberland River operated by the U.S. Army Corps of Engineers. The reservoir covers 22,500 acres (91 km^{2}) at an elevation of 445 feet (136 m) (above sea level) and extends 97.3 miles (156.6 km) (river miles). Water level fluctuations are minimal with minimum pool elevation at 442 feet (135 m). Public facilities include eight marinas, two Corps-operated campgrounds, and 41 boat access sites, as well as the Environmental Study Area.

== Environmental Study Area ==
The Environmental Study Area (ESA) at Old Hickory Lake contains a 23 acres (9.3 ha) arboretum and environmental study area which is located off of Walton Ferry Rd. The arboretum contains over 60 species of shrubs and trees. It was created and is maintained by the United States Army Corps of Engineers, who manage the lake area. The ESA is used to educate the public about the environment of the lake, and is visited by school groups for environmental studies.

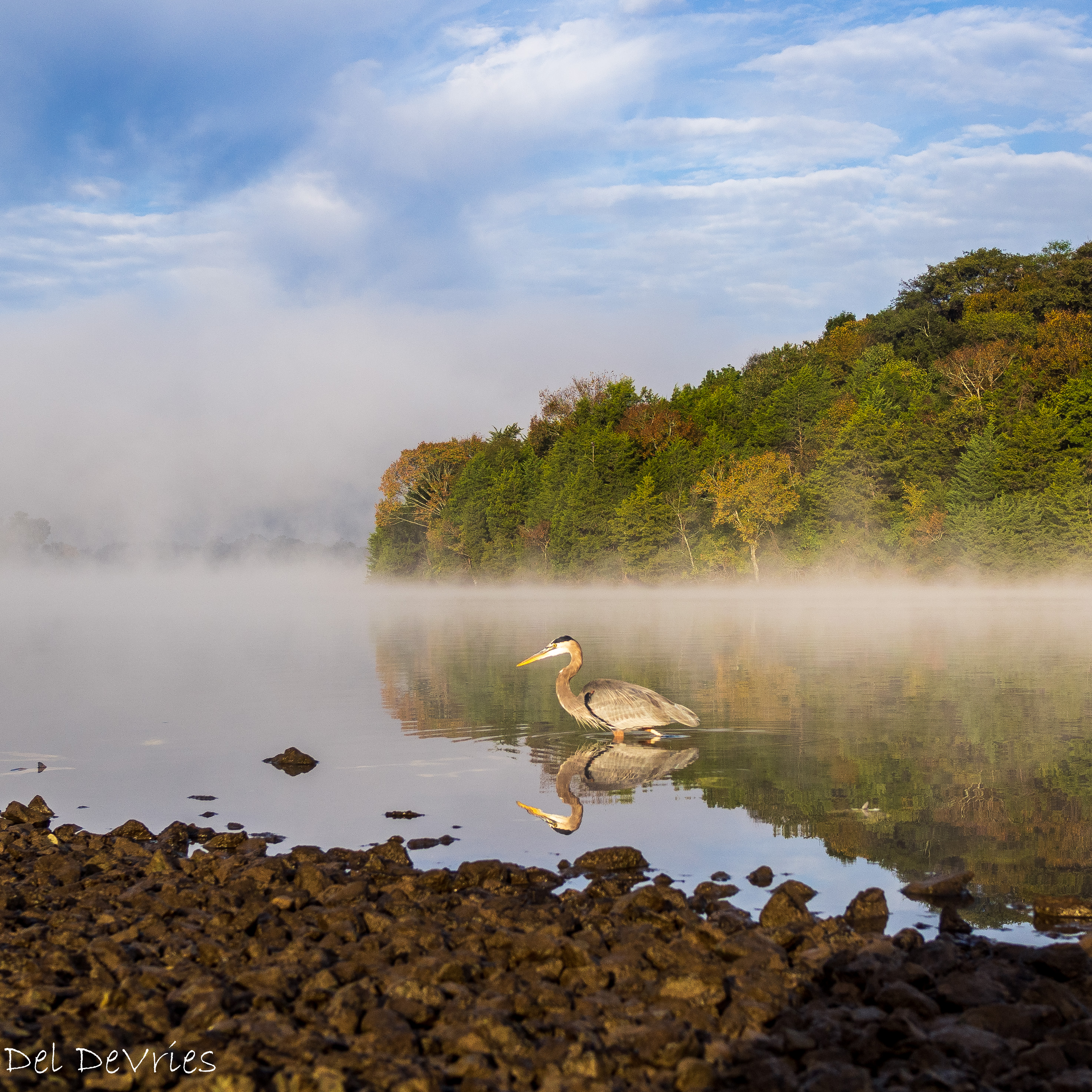
Foggy morning at Shutes Branch
