= Harpeth River State Park =

State Park in Tennessee, United States

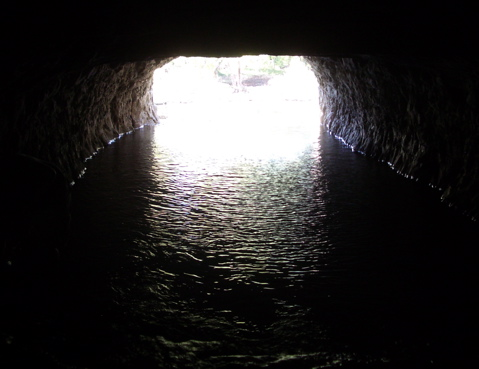
- View of the outlet from inside the tunnel during drought conditions
- Interactive map of Harpeth River State Park
- Type: Tennessee State Park
- Location: Cheatham and Davidson counties
- Coordinates: 36.14661°N 87.12072°W
- Operator: Tennessee Department of Environment and Conservation
- Website: Harpeth River State Park

Harpeth River State Park is a state park in Cheatham and Davidson counties in the U.S. state of Tennessee, in the southeastern United States. The park is a linear park that was created to connect several state historic, natural, and archaeological sites along the lower Harpeth River. The park includes an incised meander in the river known as the Narrows of the Harpeth and its associated national historic landmark, the Montgomery Bell Tunnel. The park also includes the Mound Bottom and Mace Bluff archaeological sites, the Newsom's Mill Historic Site, the Gossett Tract State Natural Area, and a section of land at Hidden Lakes.

The Montgomery Bell Tunnel is a man-made water feature in Cheatham County, Tennessee, which directs water through a tunnel at a narrow portion of an oxbow on the Harpeth River. Created in 1818 by Montgomery Bell, the 290-foot (88 m) long tunnel (state park signs at the tunnel give its length as 200 feet) was devised to power an iron-manufacturing operation known as Pattison Forge. The area is now protected as being a Tennessee state park, as well as a National Historic Landmark.
