= Hendersonville Presbyterian Church =

Church in Tennessee, United States of America

Coordinates: 36.3703°N 86.6258°W

Hendersonville Presbyterian Church (originally Beech Cumberland Presbyterian Church) is a church located in Hendersonville, Sumner County, Tennessee. The congregation was organized in 1798 by Thomas Craighead, and the first Synod of Cumberland Presbyterian Church was constituted on October 5, 1813. The Gothic Revival stone structure was erected in 1828. The adjoining cemetery contains the bodies of pioneer surveyor William Montgomery and Revolutionary War veteran John McMurtry. The building still stands and is in use today.
