= Montgomery Bell Tunnel =

- U.S. National Register of Historic Places
- U.S. National Historic Landmark
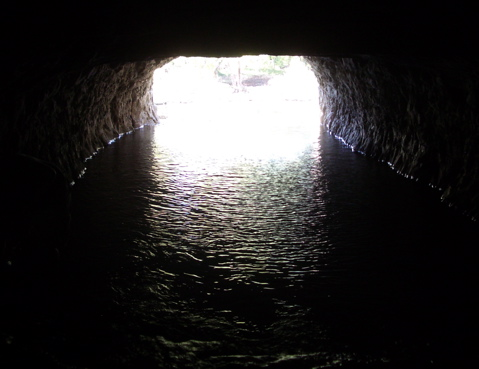
- Montgomery Bell Tunnel (interior view)

- Location within Tennessee Location within the United States
- Nearest city: White Bluff, Tennessee
- Coordinates: 36°8′48.6″N 87°7′19.4″W
- Built: 1819
- MPS: Iron Industry on the Western Highland Rim 1790s-1920s MPS
- NRHP reference No.: 94001188

Significant dates
- Added to NRHP: April 19, 1994
- Designated NHL: April 19, 1994

The Montgomery Bell Tunnel, also known as the Pattison Forge Tunnel, is a historic water diversion tunnel within Harpeth River State Park in Cheatham County, Tennessee. Named after Montgomery Bell who directed its construction, Bell called the area "Pattison Forge" (often misspelled "Patterson") in honor of his mother's maiden name. Built in 1819, the 290-foot (88 m) long tunnel is believed to be the first full-size tunnel built in the United States, and is the first used to divert water for industrial purposes. It was designated a Historic Civil Engineering Landmark in 1981, and a National Historic Landmark in 1994.

== Description and history ==
The Montgomery Bell Tunnel is located in a unit of Harpeth River State Park, north of the town of Kingston Springs, Tennessee. In this area, the Harpeth River undergoes a series of meanders. In one of these, two parts of the river are quite close after a lengthy oxbow, known as the Narrows of the Harpeth. The tunnel runs roughly north–south across this isthmus. It is 290 feet (88 m) in length, and is dug entirely through limestone rock. Neither the tunnel nor its portals are lined in any way. The tunnel's profile shape is that of a rectangle topped by a segmented arch, and it is generally 8 feet (2.4 m) high and 15 feet (4.6 m) wide. The entrance portal is 12 feet (3.7 m) high and 35 feet (11 m) wide and the exit portal is 9.5 feet (2.9 m) high and 16 feet (4.9 m) wide. The tunnel has suffered some damage over the years due to erosive forces.

Montgomery Bell, an entrepreneur from Pennsylvania who was involved in iron foundries in central Tennessee, purchased the land in this area in 1818. Recognizing the potential to apply water power to the process of producing wrought iron, he directed the construction of this tunnel, which facilitates use of a 16-foot (4.9 m) drop in river height for power generation.

The tunnel is the first known example in the United States of a "full-scale" water diversion tunnel. It is also apparently the first "full-scale" tunnel of any type in the United States, its completion predating that of the Auburn Tunnel (1821) in Pennsylvania, whose construction was begun first. The tunnel is the only feature of Bell's iron works to survive; not surviving are a dam, head race, and the iron foundry itself, as well as Bell's house, which was built nearby.

During the 1930s, the land in this area was leased to the Boy Scouts of America for use as a summer camp. It was deeded to the state in 1978.

In the late evening, on September 2, 2011, a fire was lit in the tunnel. The amount of driftwood from 2010's flood in the tunnel enlarged the fire. The fire was eventually extinguished in the early hours of the morning. The tunnel, and the road passing over it, were damaged. It and the road were stabilized, however, and Montgomery Bell Tunnel is again safe.

== See also ==
- List of National Historic Landmarks in Tennessee
- National Register of Historic Places listings in Cheatham County, Tennessee
