= James O. Bass =

American lawyer and politician (1910–2019)

James Orin Bass (July 12, 1910 – May 21, 2019) was an American lawyer and politician.

== Biography ==
Bass was born in Hendersonville, Tennessee. He went to the Nashville public schools and graduated from Montgomery Bell Academy in 1928. he graduated from Sewanee: The University of the South in 1931 and from Harvard Law School in 1934. He was admitted to the Tennessee bar and practiced law in Nashville, Tennessee. A member of the Democratic Party, he held a seat in the Tennessee House of Representatives from 1936 to 1939, and in the Tennessee Senate from 1940 to 1942. He served in the United States Army during World War II, and was commissioned a lieutenant colonel.
