= Auburn Tunnel =

- Interactive map of Auburn Tunnel

Overview
- Location: Auburn, Pennsylvania
- Coordinates: 40°36′48″N 76°06′56″W
- Status: open cut, abandoned
- System: Schuylkill Canal

Operation
- Work began: 1818
- Opened: 1821
- Closed: 1857, converted to cut
- Owner: Schuylkill Navigation Company

Technical
- Length: 450 feet (140 m)
- Max elevation: 471 feet (144 m) above Delaware River, mid tide
- Tunnel clearance: 22 feet (6.7 m)
- Width: 15 feet (4.6 m)

Auburn Tunnel was a 19th-century canal tunnel built for the Schuylkill Canal near Auburn, Pennsylvania. It was the first transportation tunnel in the United States.

The tunnel was deliberately added to the canal as a novelty, as the hill it was bored though could have easily been bypassed. It became a major attraction, with people traveling over 97 miles (156 km) upriver from Philadelphia to see it. It was periodically shortened, and in 1857 was daylighted to become an open-cut.

== See also ==
- Montgomery Bell Tunnel – a slightly earlier aqueduct tunnel in the United States
- Staple Bend Tunnel – the first railroad tunnel in the United States
