= Mound Bottom =

- U.S. National Register of Historic Places
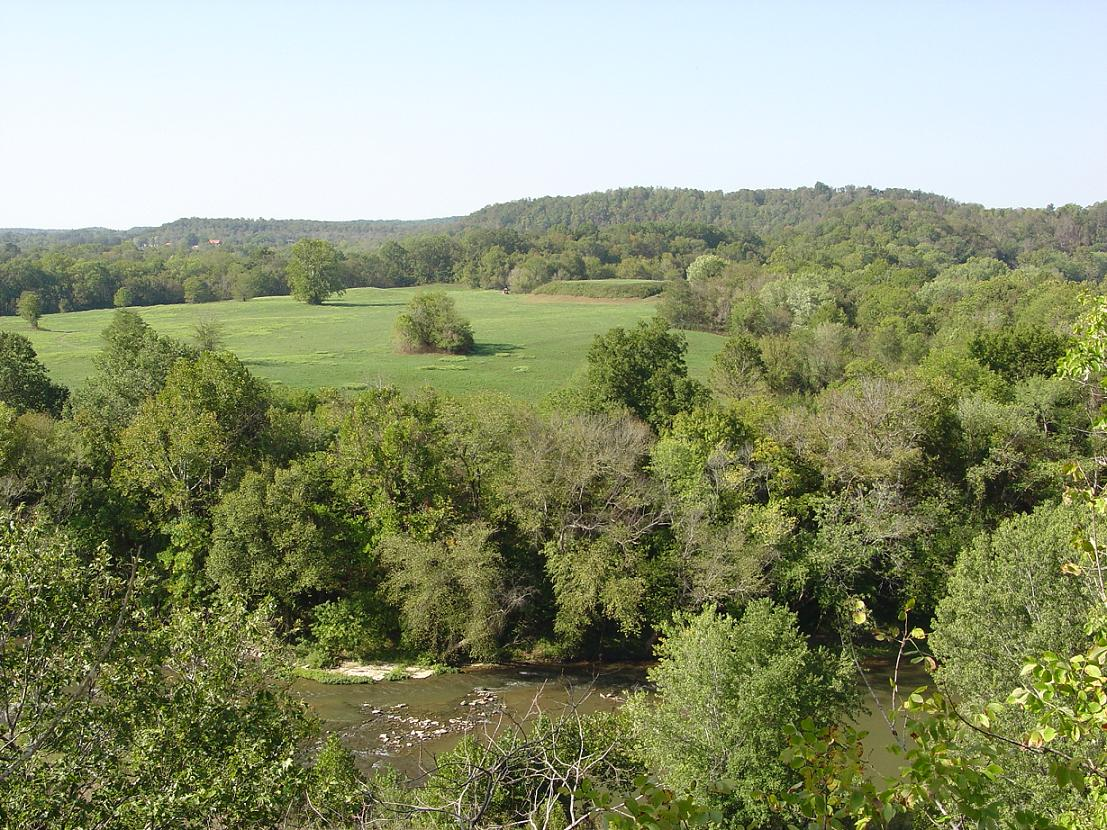
- View of the central plaza and platform mound at Mound Bottom, from May's Mace Bluff

- Location within Tennessee Location within the United States
- Location: Cheatham County, Tennessee
- Coordinates: 36°8′23.35″N 87°6′4.93″W
- Built: 950-1300 AD
- NRHP reference No.: 71000813
- Added to NRHP: 1971

Mound Bottom is a prehistoric Native American complex in Cheatham County, Tennessee, located in the Southeastern United States. The complex, which consists of earthen platform and burial mounds, a 7-acre central plaza, and habitation areas, was occupied between approximately 1000 and 1300 AD, during the Mississippian period.

The Mound Bottom site is likely associated with another mound complex located just over a mile to the south known as the Pack Site, or Great Mound Division, and together they have been called the "Great Mound Group." Due to structural similarities in the mounds and ceramic chronologies, these sites are believed to have been contemporaneous.

== Geographical setting ==
Mound Bottom is situated on a horseshoe bend of the Harpeth River at the river's confluence with Mound Creek, which approaches the riverbank opposite the site from the east. The Mound Bottom bend is one in a series of sharp bends found along the lower Harpeth as the river twists and turns through a steep gorge en route to its confluence with the Cumberland River several miles to the north. The Harpeth surrounds Mound Bottom on the north, south, and east, while the entry to the bend from the west is marked by rocky uplands.

Mound Bottom is today located approximately 1-mile (1.6 km) north of the point where U.S. Route 70 crosses the Harpeth River, on the outskirts of Kingston Springs. The site is managed by the Tennessee Department of Environment and Conservation as part of Harpeth River State Park. Site access is prohibited without accompaniment by park rangers or the Tennessee Division of Archaeology. The Pack Site is located on private property approximately 1.5 miles (2.4 km) southwest of Mound Bottom, just south of US-70, and is not open for visitation.

== Archaeological history of Mound Bottom ==
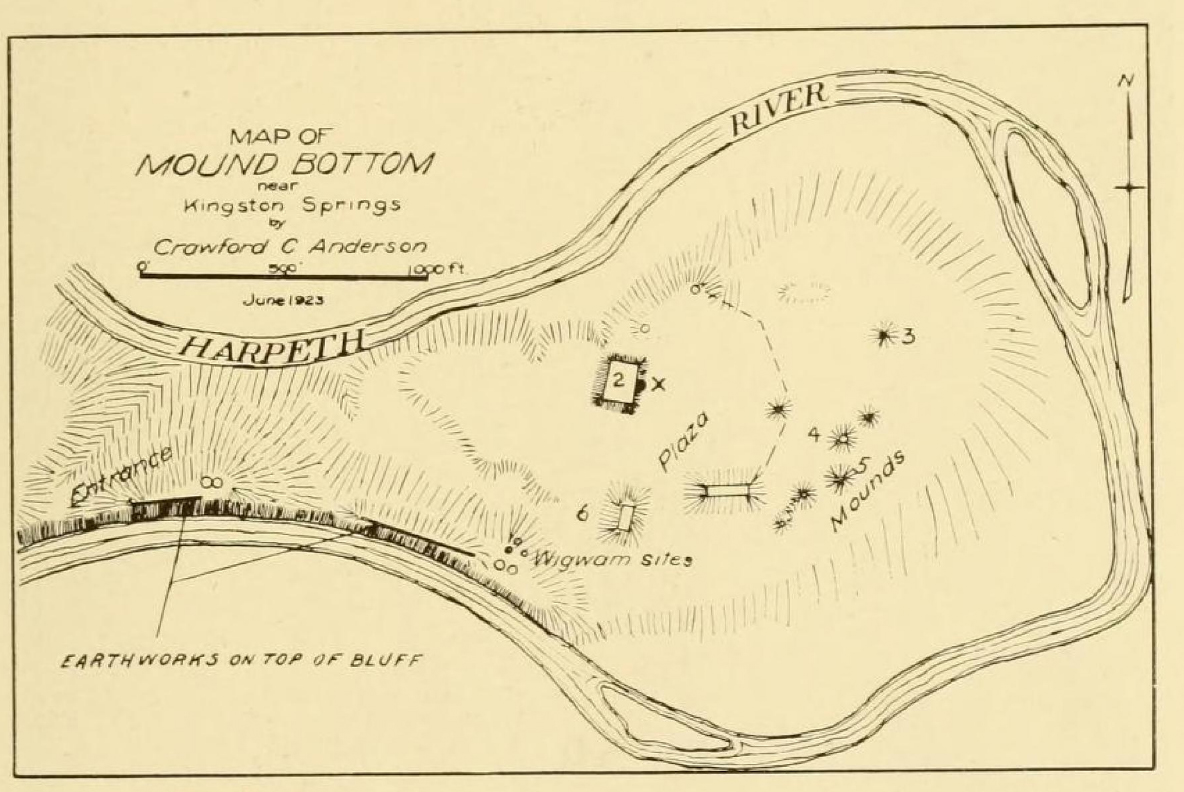
1923 map of Mound bottom prepared by Crawford C. Anderson

Together the Mound Bottom site and Pack Site contain up to 34 earthen mounds, including between 11 and 14 at Mound Bottom and 20 at Pack. Some of these are flat-topped platform mounds that supported structures including ceremonial buildings or elite residences, while others were burial mounds. At Mound Bottom, the principal large flat-topped mound and up to 13 additional smaller mounds were arranged around a central plaza. The principal mound at Mound Bottom originally stood at least 36 feet tall and measured about 246 feet along each side of its base, and is oriented approximately 11 degrees east of north. The mound summit was originally accessed via a ramp or staircase located at the midpoint of the eastern face. According to early historical reports the Mound Bottom complex was surrounded by an earthen wall topped with a palisade of upright logs. However, any sign of the palisade had been plowed away by the early 1920s. In addition to the earthen, mounds, the site also included hundreds of houses, cemeteries, and agricultural fields.

The late prehistoric Native American culture of the Nashville Basin has been referenced in older and non-scholarly sources as being either the Mound Builders or the Stone Graves Race. Today archaeologists understand that Mound Bottom, Pack, and other late prehistoric mound sites in the area surrounding Nashville were constructed by a regional Mississippian culture known as Middle Cumberland Mississippian. This regional culture was first defined in the 1970s based on distinctive mortuary offerings and the presence of stone box burials, and has since been refined using ceramic typologies A recent reassessment of the Middle Cumberland Mississippian by Moore and Smith resulted in a revised chronology and new understanding of Mound Bottom's placement in the regional cultural sequence. Both Mound Bottom and Pack appear to have been initially established early in the Mississippian period (ca. A.D. 1000) by individuals from outside the region. Based on artifact types and skeletal examinations, it appears these founders may have come from the American Bottom, and possibly from the site of Cahokia. As a result of this connection, the Middle Cumberland Culture in Tennessee was part of the larger Mississippian Ideological Interaction Sphere (previously known as the Southern Cult and Southeastern Ceremonial Complex), which connected late prehistoric cultures from the Great Lakes, Gulf Coast, and the Appalachian Mountains.

By A.D. 1350, Mound Bottom and Pack appear to have been abandoned as a major centers, and while mound building and repair ceased, both sites continued to be used as burial locations. This change corresponds to a period of apparent political destabilization in the region, as the centralized authority of Mound Bottom and other large early sites gave way to fortified, autonomous village centers. This is followed in turn by a gradual abandonment of the region toward the end of the fourteenth century. According to Moore and Smith (2009, page 210), by A.D. 1475, Mississippian settlement of the region drop well below the level of archaeological visibility.

== Mound Bottom in recorded history ==
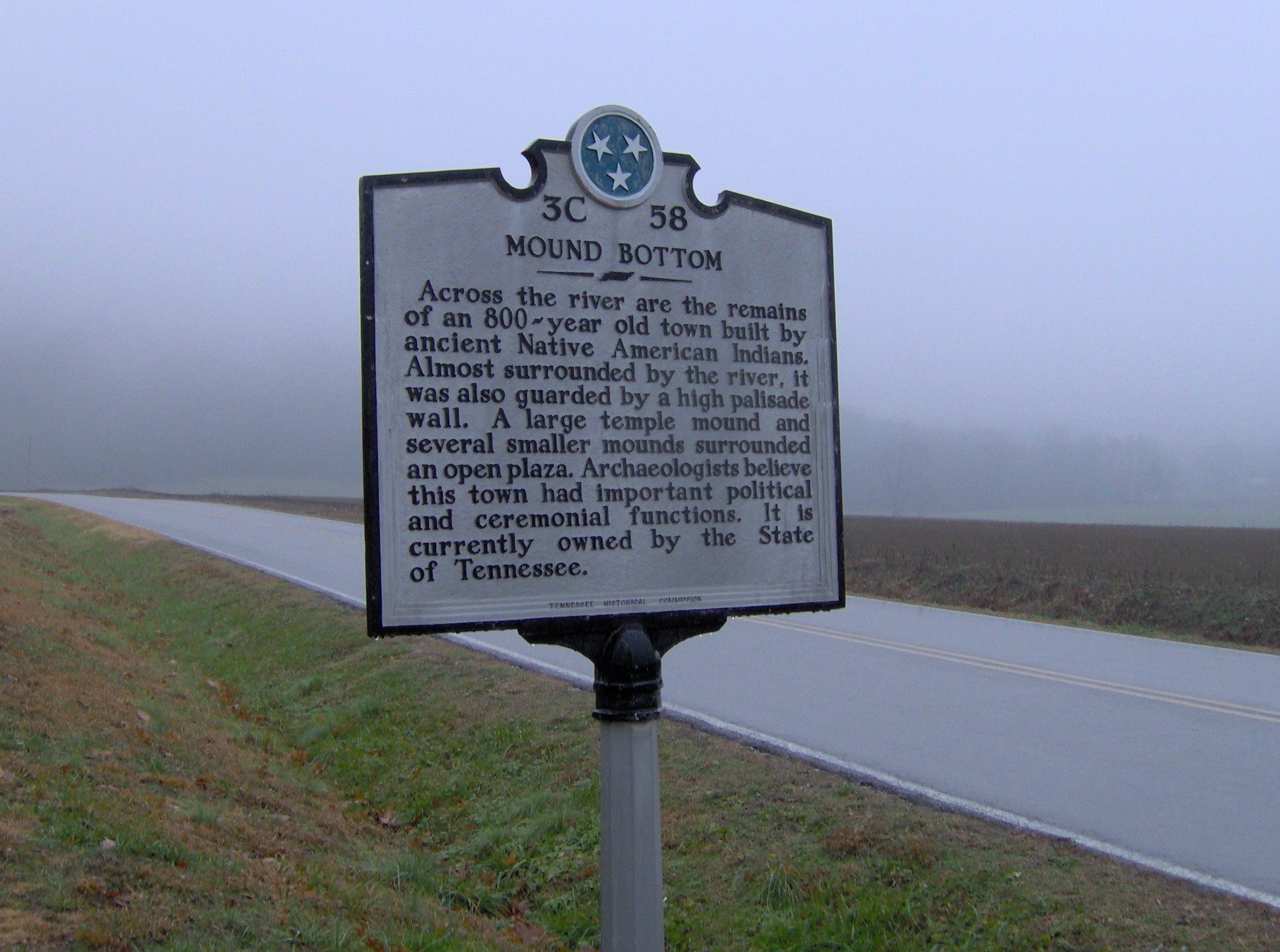
THC marker along Cedar Hill Road

Early Tennessee historian John Haywood noted Mound Bottom's importance as an aboriginal site in 1823, and early settlers reported seeing large fortifications and towers at the site. In the late 1860s, Joseph Jones of the Smithsonian Institution investigated several prehistoric sites in Tennessee, and reported "extraordinary aboriginal works" at Mound Bottom.

In 1923, William E. Myer, also working with the Smithsonian, carried out the first modern investigation of the Mound Bottom site. Myer uncovered evidence of a structure and hearth atop one of the mounds at the Pack site and evidence of 10 ancient houses at Mound Bottom. Tennessee state archaeologist P.E. Cox followed up on Myer's finds in 1926, uncovering a number of stone box burials and baked clay floors. Parmenio Edward Cox, Tennessee's first State Archaeologist, conducted a month of fieldwork at Mound Bottom in 1926. Cox excavated at least 70 graves and tested nine mounds No report on those excavations was published. In 1936, 1937, and 1940 the University of Tennessee conducted excavations at both Mound Bottom and the Pack Site under the auspices of the Works Progress Administration. Those excavations were directed by Charles Nash, and examined several cemeteries and a burial mound.

In 1972, the State of Tennessee purchased the Mound Bottom site to preserve it as a state archaeological area. The Tennessee Division of Archaeology dispatched Carl Kuttruff and Michael O'Brien to conduct excavations at Mound Bottom in 1974 and 1975. Kuttruff and O'Brien tested six mounds and 19 houses. The results of those excavations were published in 2012 in the journal Southeastern Archaeology.

In 2005, Mound Bottom became part of Harpeth River State Park, a "linear park" connecting several archaeological, historical, and natural areas along the lower Harpeth. The site is closed to the public, although guided tours are available by request. In 2008 an adjacent 65-acre parcel including additional site area was purchased with the assistance of Tennessee Parks and Greenways Foundation.

Mound Bottom and the adjacent pictograph at May's Mace Bluff were the inspiration for the 2014 Tennessee Archaeology Awareness Month poster, created by the Tennessee Council for Professional Archaeology.

== See also ==
- List of Mississippian sites
