= Old Hickory Lock and Dam =

Dam on the Cumberland River in Tennessee, United States

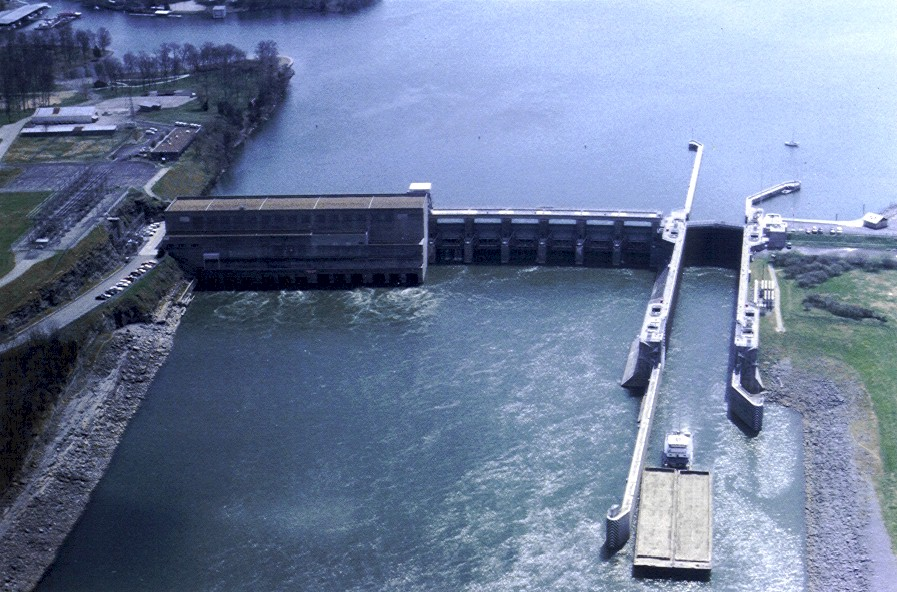
- The Old Hickory Lock and Dam forms Old Hickory Lake.

- Location within Tennessee
- Country: US
- Coordinates: 36°17′48″N 86°39′20″W
- Purpose: Flood, Navigation, Power
- Status: Operational
- Construction began: January 1952
- Opening date: December 1957
- Owner: USACE

Dam and spillways
- Spillways: 6

Reservoir
- Creates: Old Hickory Lake
- Total capacity: 467,000 acre⋅ft (0.576 km^{3})
- Catchment area: 11,674 mi^{2} (30,240 km^{2})
- Surface area: 22,500 acres (9,100 ha)
- Maximum length: 97.3 mi (156.6 km)

Old Hickory Lock and Dam is a dam located in middle Tennessee on the Cumberland River at river mile 216.2 in Sumner and Davidson Counties, approximately 25 miles (40 km) upstream from Nashville. The reservoir behind the dam is Old Hickory Lake. The dam and lake are named after President Andrew Jackson (nicknamed "Old Hickory"), who lived in the vicinity at The Hermitage.

== Construction ==
Old Hickory Lock and Dam was authorized for construction by the Rivers and Harbors Act of 1946 as a unit of a comprehensive development plan for the Cumberland River Basin. The project was designed by the U.S. Army Corps of Engineers and built by private contractors under the Corp's supervision. Construction started in January 1952, and dam closure was completed in June 1954. The project was completed for full beneficial use in December 1957 with the placement of the final hydroelectric power unit in operation.

== Reservoir ==
Old Hickory Reservoir is 97.3 miles (156.6 km) long lying between Nashville and Carthage. The reservoir is essentially a run-of-river type without regulating storage other than for incidental flood control through surcharge operation, and for pondage for power generation and lockages; hence, low water flow of the river will be increased only indirectly through the use and passage of discharges from upstream plants. Such releases, however, result in a more sufficient and higher quality of water for domestic and industrial consumption and use are effective in pollution abatement downstream.

Due to the fairly constant level maintained under normal operating conditions, the reservoir is well suited for conservation and recreational purposes. Beginning in 2007, the multi-year altered flow and water temperatures resulting from the emergency maintenance on the Wolf Creek Dam affected Old Hickory like the other Cumberland River reservoirs and resulted in modifications about environmental management.

== Operation ==
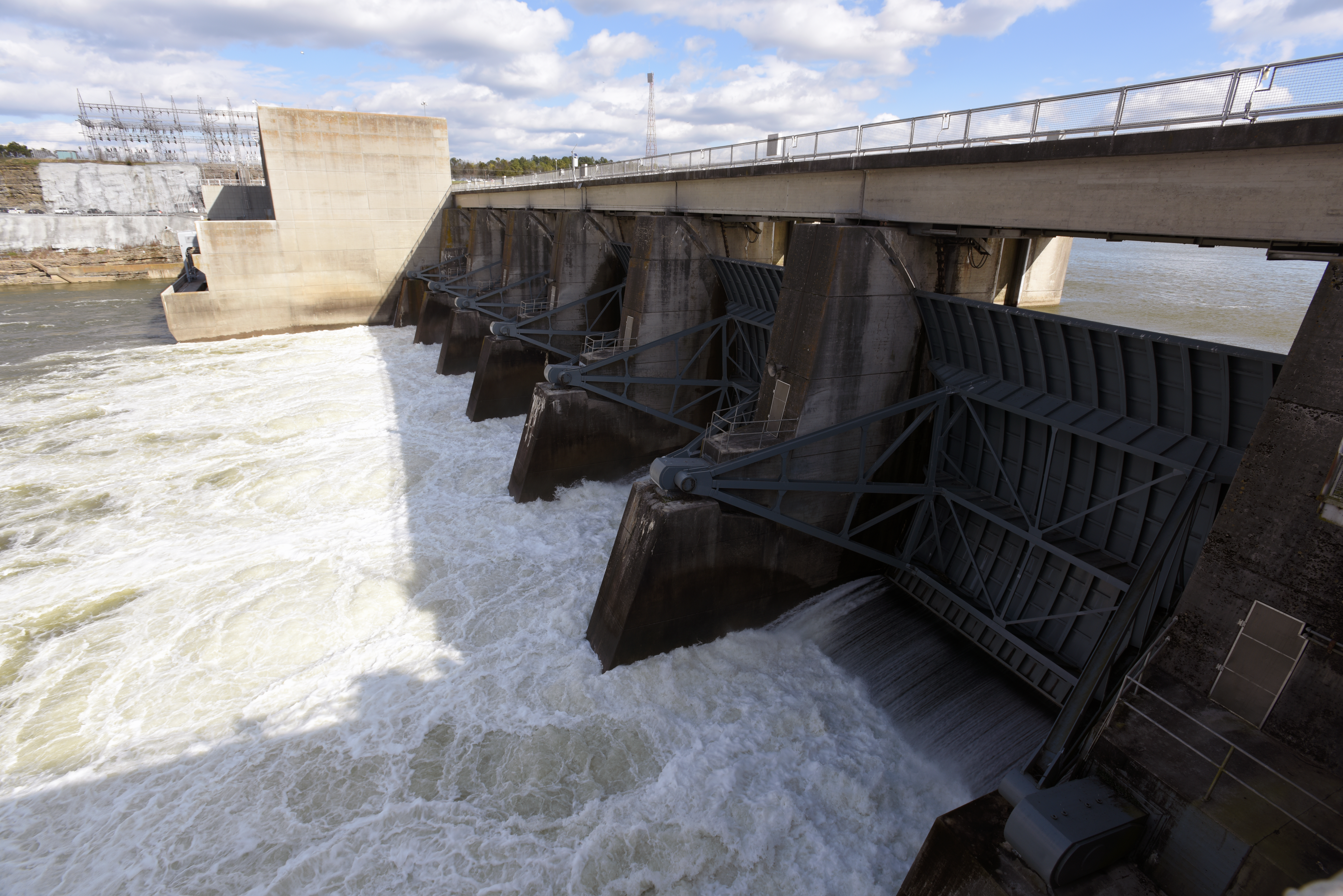
Old Hickory Lock and Dam

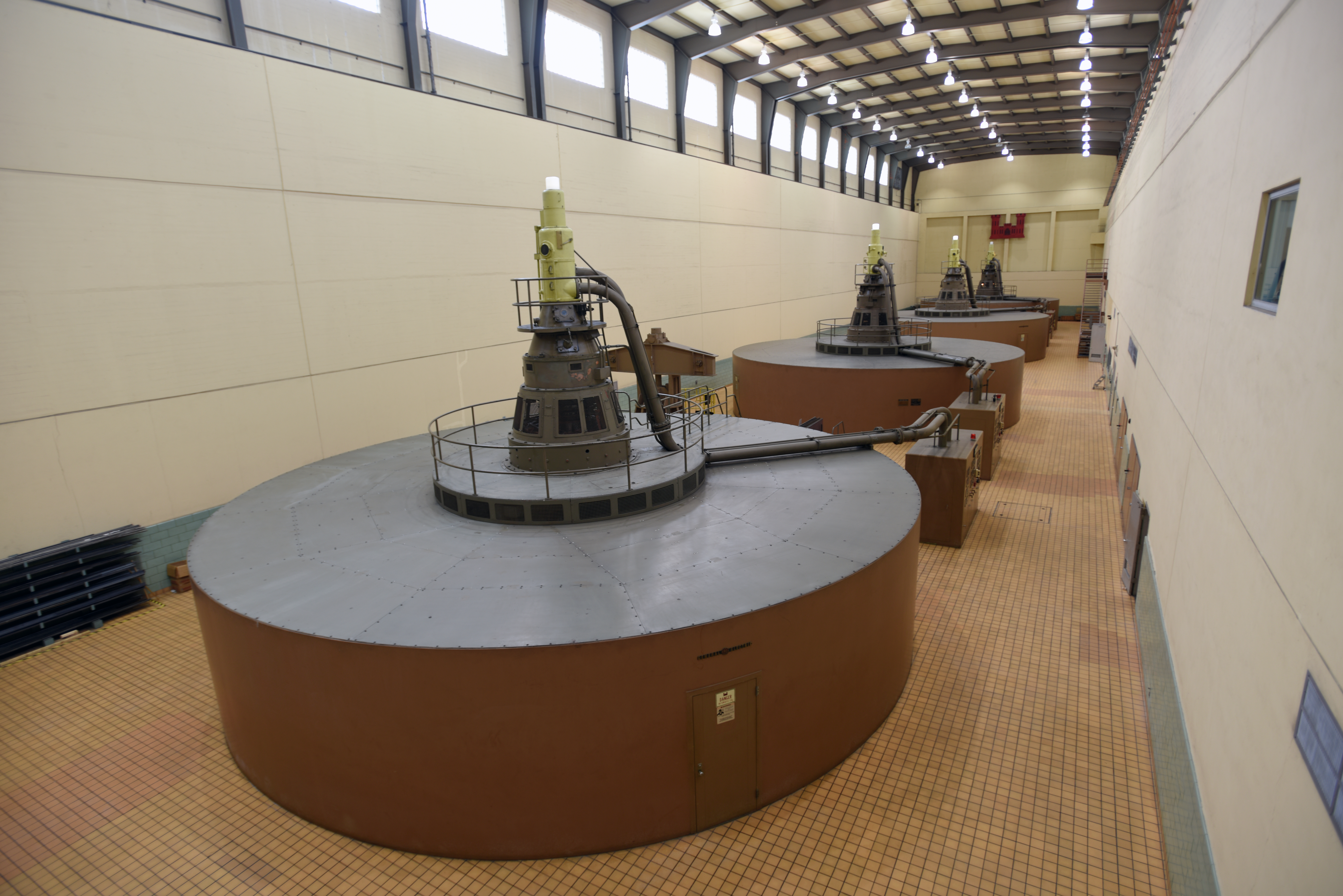
Powerplant

The lock, dam, powerhouse and lake are operated and supervised by the U.S. Army Corps of Engineers' personnel under the direction of the District Engineer at Nashville. The lock allows barges and recreational boats to navigate the Cumberland River.

The power plant is operated so as to use as much of the water flow as possible for power production. During periods of high stream flow, the spillway gates are opened to pass the water in excess of the capacity of the turbines, and as necessary for retention and regulation of floodwaters through surcharge operation. The upper portion of the reservoir, corresponding to a five-foot depth above the normal headwater level, is provided for surcharge storage. This storage space is utilized by raising all of the spillway gates in small equal increments, thus permitting passage of some water under them, but retaining or forcing into storage all inflow to the reservoir in excess of the spillway discharge and power releases.

Electricity from the dam is marketed by the Southeastern Power Administration.

== 2010 Flooding ==
Old Hickory was a key element in flood control during flooding on the Cumberland River in 2010. The operation and timing of water releases, following the 13.5 inches (340 mm) of rain over two days, subsequently became the subject of a US Senate hearing.

Cheatham Dam located below Nashville was so flooded that the Corps pulled out the spillway gates and evacuated the dam allowing the river free discharge over the dam which was considered in the design. Old Hickory was not designed for a dam over-topping so a priority for the Corps was to prevent the reservoir overflowing the dam. The river upstream finally stopped rising on Sunday night with the reservoir approximately one foot below the top of the dam.

A few days before the flood, Old Hickory Dam was releasing approximately 32,000 cubic feet per second (910 m^{3}/s) of water. At the peak release on Sunday afternoon, the dam was releasing a record flow of over 212,260 cubic feet per second (6,011 m^{3}/s) of water.
