= Rock Castle (Hendersonville, Tennessee) =

Historic house in Tennessee, United States

- U.S. National Register of Historic Places
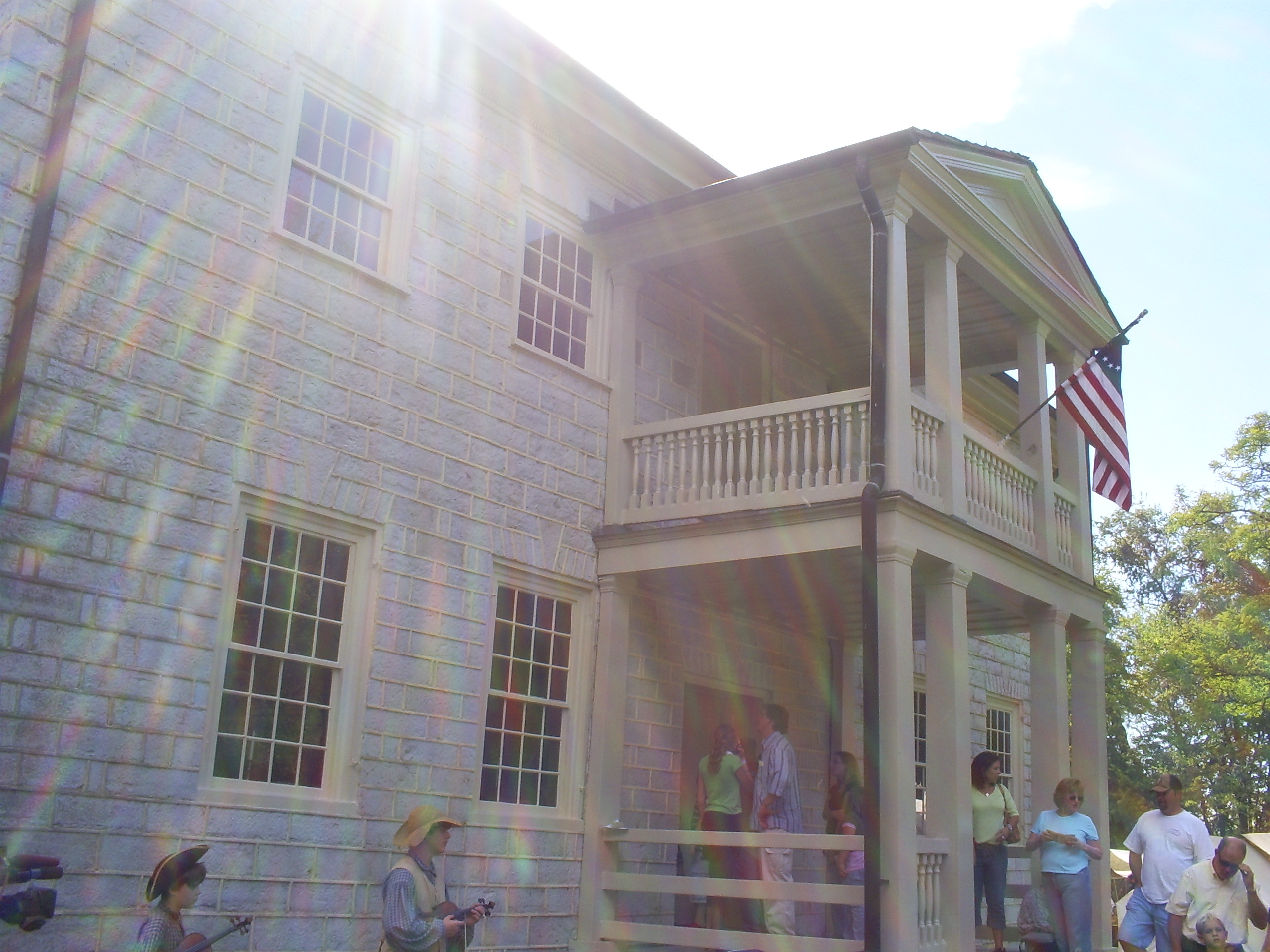

- Location within Tennessee Location within the United States
- Location: SE of Hendersonville on Indian Lake Rd; 139 Rock Castle Lane, Hendersonville, TN 37075-4522, USA
- Nearest city: Hendersonville, Tennessee
- Coordinates: 36°16′45″N 86°35′47″W
- NRHP reference No.: 70000619
- Added to NRHP: July 8, 1970

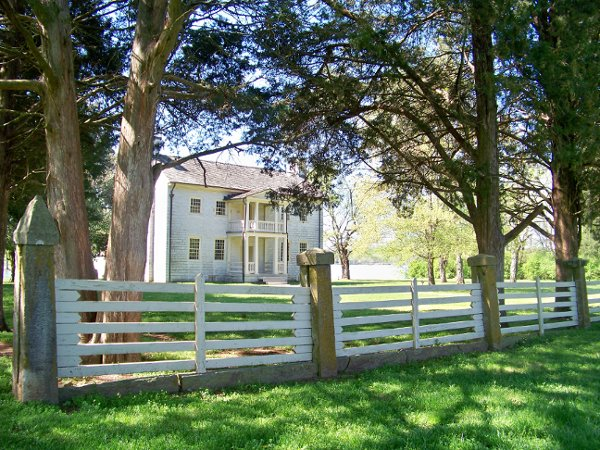
View of mansion

Rock Castle State Historic Site, located in Hendersonville, Sumner County, Tennessee, is the former home of Daniel Smith. Construction began in 1784; its completion was delayed by conflicts with area Native Americans and the house was completed in 1796. It is listed with the National Register of Historic Places and is open to the public. It is one of the Tennessee Historical Commission's State-Owned Historic Sites and is operated by the Friends of Rock Castle in partnership with the Tennessee Historical Commission.

== Daniel Smith ==
Picture of Daniel Smith Donelson, Daniel Smith's grandson

Daniel Smith served as a captain in Lord Dunmore's War, a colonel in the American Revolution, and a Brigadier General of the militia in the Metro District. He was a member of the committee to frame the U.S. Bill of Rights, a Territorial Secretary of State, and a U.S. Senator. He also surveyed land boundaries in Middle Tennessee.

Daniel Smith was born in Stafford County, Virginia in 1748 as a twin. He was baptized in Elbo Warren Baptist Church October 24, which was five days before his twin sister, Sarah, died. Smith lived in Baltimore, Maryland before he moved into the home of Dr. Thomas Walker. At Walker's, Smith studied medicine and surveying. Dr. Walker was famous for being the legal guardian of Thomas Jefferson. While they were not close in age, Jefferson and Smith did know each other, but Congressional records prove that they met. In these records, Jefferson praises Smith "For intelligence, well-cultivated talents, integrity, and usefulness, in soundness of judgment in the practice of virtue and in shunning violence unequaled by few men, and in the purity of excelled by none." Later, Smith studied at the College of William and Mary, Jefferson's alma mater.

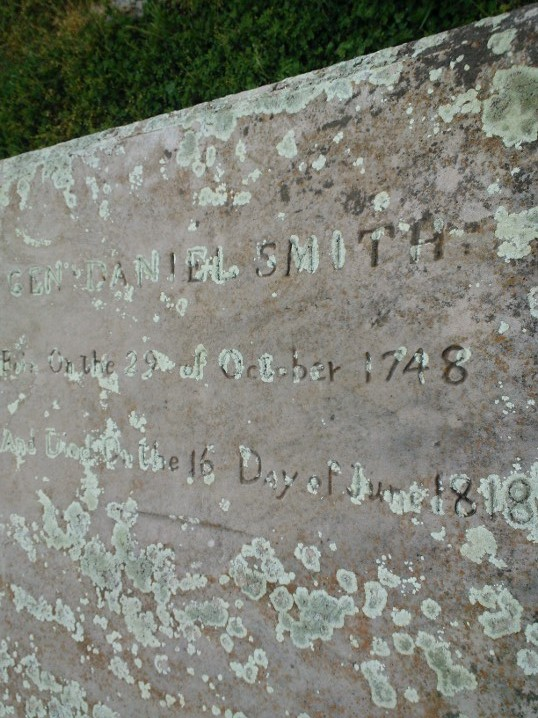
Grave Marker of Daniel Smith

Smith served in the American Revolutionary War. He was a captain and was appointed a Justice of the Peace by Patrick Henry. He was promoted to Major of the Washington County, Tennessee Militia. In 1778, Daniel Smith was appointed commissioner to locate roads. In 1779, along with Dr. Walker, he was appointed to extend the line between Virginia and North Carolina. This later became the divisional lines of Kentucky and Tennessee. Afterward, in April 1778, Major Smith was recommended to become the Sheriff of Washington County. He was appointed Commissioner of Tax in the same year. Later that same year, Smith was appointed Examiner of the Bills of Credit. President George Washington appointed Smith as Secretary of the Territory South of the Ohio, Southwest Territory in 1790.

Later Smith became Indian negotiator, where he negotiated most of the treaties with the Cherokee Indians in Tennessee. Smith, as mapmaker, created maps of Tennessee and Kentucky. He is the man that named the state "Tennasee" or "Tanasi", pronounced \ten-'ah-see\. The name was chosen for a Cherokee settlement in the eastern part of the state. Smith drafted the State Constitution of Tennessee and was one of the men who drafted a constitution for the Continental Congress in 1796. While his draft was not chosen as the Federal Constitution, his work was chosen for the State of Tennessee. Smith became one of the earliest Senators for Tennessee, and served two terms. Daniel Smith also surveyed the area that would become Nashville, the Tennessee state capital.

In 1773, Smith married Sarah Michie. In 1783 Major Smith moved to the area that would become Tennessee with his wife and two young children to take up land that was given to him by the State of Virginia for his services in the Revolutionary War. He moved into a small log cabin. The Smith family lived in this for only a short time before the local American Indians burned it down in one of many isolated raids.

His best friend and neighbor was Andrew Jackson. Jackson's original log cabin was a two-story structure in Hunter's Hill, down the river from Smith's home. Smith filled the vacancy in the Senate that was left open by Jackson's resignation. Smith was also an in-law of Jackson's.

== Sarah Michie Smith ==
Marker of Sarah Smith

Sarah was born in 1755 to William Michie, the man that built the Michie Tavern near Charlottesville, Virginia. Her father, a Jacobite, was sentenced to transportation for his ideology. He and his family, including the very young Sarah, were brought to the American colonies for a mandatory period of seven years. After the allotted time had passed, William bought a tract of land from Major John Henry and built a permanent family home. His land was so close to a very well-traveled road that soon after finishing the house, travelers would stop in regularly. Eventually, William decided to open a proper tavern in his home to accommodate his frequent guests.

Sarah grew up a socialite. She would have been in the same circles as founding fathers such as Thomas Jefferson and Patrick Henry. This is how she met Dr. Thomas Walker, who ended up introducing Sarah to Daniel and is credited with setting up their romantic relationship. In 1773, Daniel and Sarah were wed.

After Sarah married Daniel, they moved to the Virginian frontier. Here is where she gave birth to their two children, George and Mary Ann (nicknamed Polly). All four moved to Sumner County, Tennessee in 1783. They "arrived in October, and spent at least the first winter in a log cabin. Isolated… under very real danger from Indian attack." Because of her husband's jobs, she found herself alone with her children most of the time. The family described her as having "uncommon strength and courage with a strong sense of humor." Her outgoing and strong nature can also be found in the opening line of a letter she wrote to her husband after a long period of his absence which reads, "Dear Husband, I still find myself under the disagreeable necessity of conversing with you on paper or not at all."

Sarah's social life was impacted greatly when she moved to isolated Sumner county, but she quickly found friendship with Rachel Jackson. Rachel was not an outgoing person to begin with, but after the scandal surrounding her marriage to two men at once broke, she became a complete recluse. However, she knew she had a close friend in Sarah and found herself at the Smith's home often.

== George Smith ==
George Smith was the son of Daniel and Sarah Smith. He was born in Virginia in 1775 and moved with his family to Sumner County when he was about eight years old. George would grow up to inherit the home. As an adult, he incurred a large amount of debt as a result of his struggles with both drinking and gambling. George's son, who was a surveyor and a soldier like his grandfather, would end up having to bail his father out of debt to maintain the house.

== Mary Anne "Polly" Smith Donelson Saunders ==
Polly was the daughter of Daniel and Sarah Smith. She was raised almost entirely on the frontier of the United States, having been born in 1781 and having moved to nearly unsettled land in 1783 at the age of two. At the age of fifteen, her father decided to send her to a boarding school in Philadelphia where she would be expected to become a proper young woman in the eyes of the Smith's society. However, Polly did not want to leave because she had fallen in love with 22-year-old Samuel Donelson, Rachel Jackson's brother and Andrew Jackson's partner in law. Polly's father did not want the two to be married, so Andrew and Samuel came up with a plan. They rode over to the Smith's home, where Jackson assisted Polly down a ladder placed against her bedroom window. Andrew Jackson, Samuel Donelson, and Polly Smith traversed down the river to the Jackson's home where a minister was waiting. The two married immediately. After learning of the marriage, Daniel became enraged and essentially disowned his daughter. A year later he welcomed her back into the family after she delivered his first grandchild. Polly would go on to have three children with Samuel, all boys.

Ten years into their marriage, Samuel died of pneumonia. Polly remarried with James Saunders, a member of the Saunders family that ran ferries up and down the Cumberland river in the late 1700s. He was also a widower. When they married, the Saunders's had nine children, and over the course of their marriage they had nine more. As a result of their stepfather's abuse, Polly and Samuel's three sons would soon leave the family home. Her oldest joined the military and passed away in service, while her younger two, Andrew Jackson Donelson and Daniel Smith Donelson, were adopted by Andrew and Rachel Jackson.

Polly Smith Donelson

== Slaves at Rock Castle ==
Few records survive regarding the history of enslaved people at Rock Castle. However, two enslaved people are frequently named in surviving documents. A woman named Easter, who worked in the house as a maid or nanny, lived in a loft above the dining room with her husband Alfred. The Smith family referred to this man as "Uncle Alfred," a common occurrence between slaveholding families and the enslaved people who most personally and closely served the family. A newspaper from 1910 also tells the story of an unnamed enslaved man who worked as a foreman on the farm being abducted from the site by Native Americans and taken east. When Smith was a Senator, the enslaved man contacted him to plead for a bounty so that he could be set free from his most recent captivity. Smith offered $900 to the Native people who abducted the unnamed enslaved man, and was transferred from the abductors to the plantation landscape of Rock Castle. The man was quoted as saying that he was "anxious to return to his old master and home." More reliable records show that by 1860, the Smiths owned 98 slaves. There are two letters of bill of sale that name the following slaves being sold from George Smith to Harry Smith in 1833:

Isaac, Martin, Charles, Cheshire, Larkin, Ina, Toby, Wilson, David, Henry, Sarah, Rachel, Judy (or Juda), Baty, Mitchel, Daniel, Jeffrey, Patricia, and Patricia's two children, Henrietta and Silva (or Silvia).

== Mansion and grounds ==
In 1788, Daniel Smith (surveyor) acquired 4,722 acres (1,911 ha) of land in Sumner County, Tennessee along the Cumberland River and Drake's Creek. This was added to his land grant from North Carolina for his services to the Revolutionary War. This made a total of 3,140 acres (1,270 ha) for Senator Dan Smith. Polly, Daniel and Sarah's daughter, received 151 acres (61 ha) at the death of her father. Sarah received the land below this, in the amount of 1,510 acres (610 ha). The rest of the land, including the mansion went to the son, George Smith. Over time, land was sold off for newer housing. Now, 18 acres (7.3 ha) adjoin the mansion.

The mansion was originally located near a stream that no longer flows. There were many slave cabins, a springhouse, and a smoke house. When Old Hickory Lake was created in 1954, the flood submerged most of the area behind the house. The smokehouse was razed to accommodate dirt brought in to prevent the house from flooding. Other buildings included the carriage house and barns.

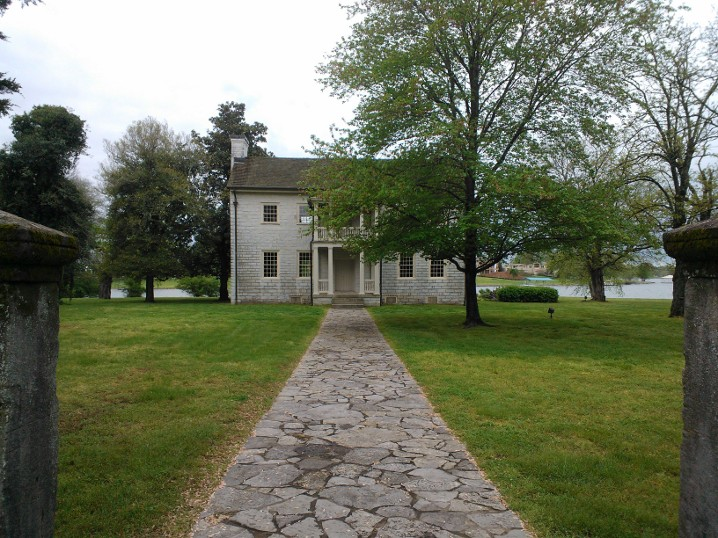
Front of Mansion

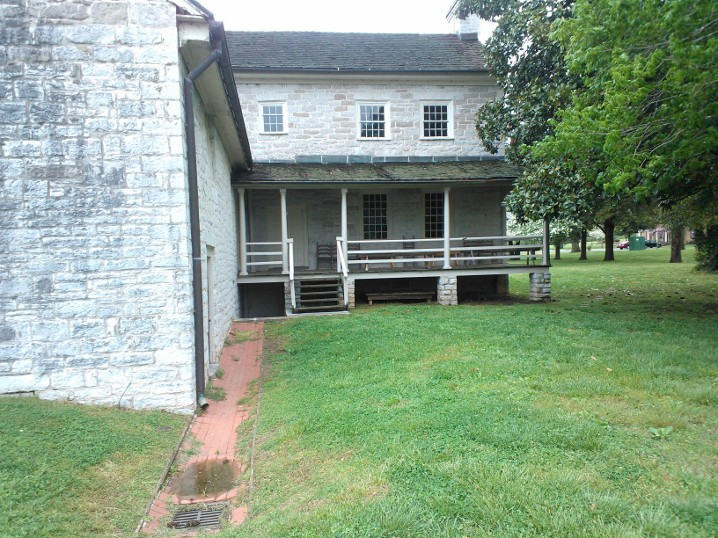
View from the Smokehouse looking toward the back of the mansion showing all three styles of masonry

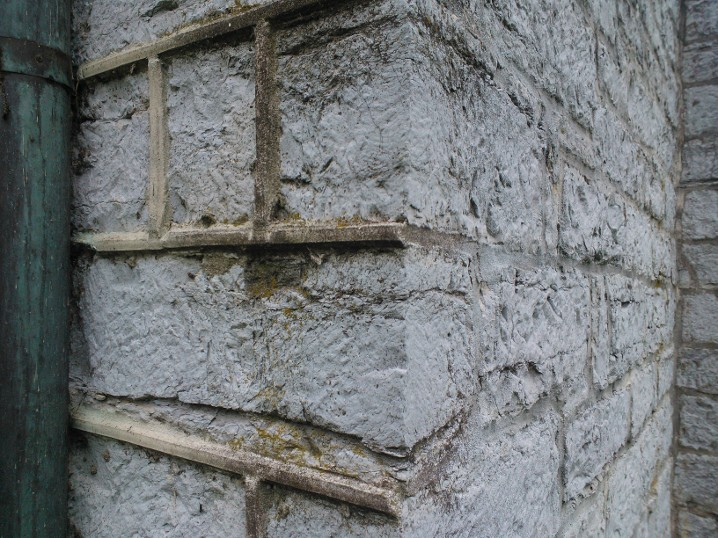
Flemish Style Masonry of Rock Castle

The mansion was built in three sections over ten to twelve years. The mansion was built from rocks quarried on site. The first house built was three stories: a kitchen, a bedroom, and an attic. The stone construction inspired the myth that the house was a fireproof "castle" and that the rock protected the family from fires caused by cooking and set by Native Americans defending their right to the land. Later, a three-story addition was added including a basement, a dining room, and a third room that originally had four dormers that were removed later. The mantle over and around the fireplace is black-maple harvested from Rock Castle's grounds. The last and third edition to the house was added to the front of the house, the most formal portion of the house. Though this area is currently interpreted as the downstairs master bedroom, it may have been originally used as a withdrawing or retiring room. The third addition also houses Daniel Smith's office. The walls in the space are decorated with faux painting. The upstairs houses George Smith's bedroom and room of unknown use. Rock Castle is the earliest known version of Federal Style architecture in Tennessee. The Greek revival facade with columns and porch may have been added by George Smith or his son Harry. Originally, the house consisted of nine rooms total.

As with any historic Middle Tennessee house of this era, construction items could be made on site, purchased from a local merchant, or ordered from exporters located farther east. Window glass could be shipped in cases, as were hinges, English locks, and barrels of cut nails. Enslaved workers with masonry skill mixed cement mortar from lime and sand binding the wall stones together in a "length-wise and width-wise alternately… Flemish bond pattern." This pattern requires planning, skill, and a good understanding of mathematics. Originally the roof was probably clad in pine shingles. A wooden fence painted with lime wash is said to be original to the house.

Smith Hansborough, who is thought to be Daniel Smith's nephew, may have commanded a group of enslaved workers as the project's overseer. In one of his letters to Daniel Smith, Hansborough discusses the progress of the house's construction.

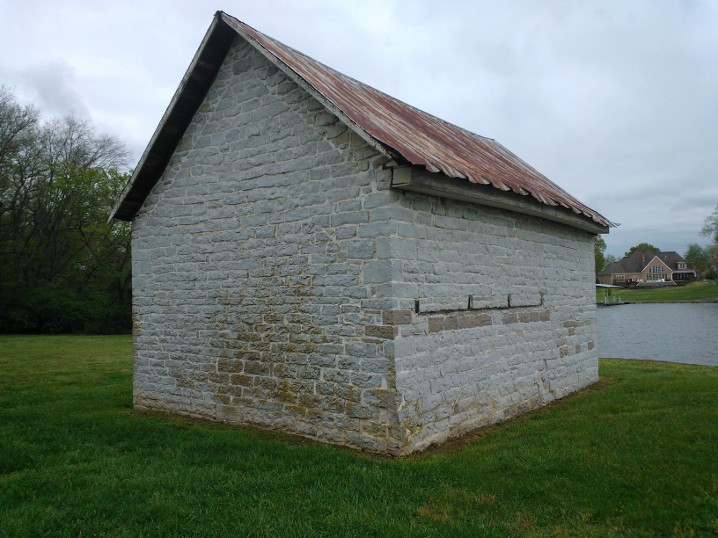
The Smoke House - original plus top layer of bricks from when the lake was added

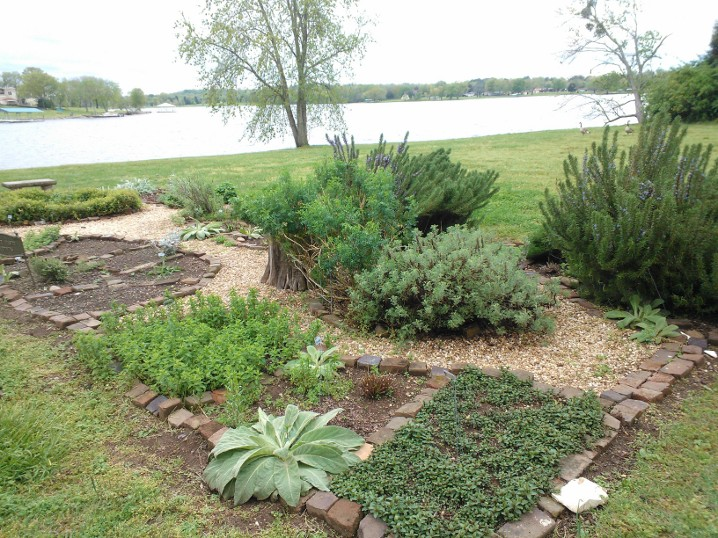
Herb Garden on the side of mansion, showing Old Hickory Lake

There was also an herb garden and peach orchard on the grounds. The Smiths were locally famous for their peach brandy, which was sold at five shillings per gallon. Since Daniel Smith had training in the medical field, his gardens may have produced plants used for medicine including rosemary and mint, which helps in digestion and depression. The main agricultural enterprise of Rock Castle's plantation landscape was wheat and cotton.

== Family cemetery ==
There are over fifty family members buried within the small family cemetery on site. The two largest markers are for the founding members, Daniel and Sarah Michie Smith and their son Colonel George Smith. They both have a table-like marker that apparently covers the entire grave. Senator Smith's is breaking down more, but can still be read. There are other small markers, as well as obelisk style markers and pediment style markers within. A stone fence with an iron gate surrounds the cemetery. The stones were quarried using the same stone as the mansion.

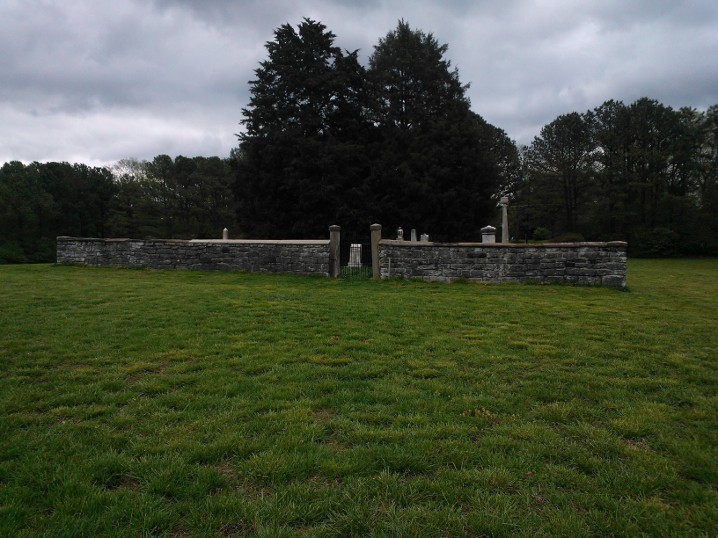
Family Cemetery at Rock Castle

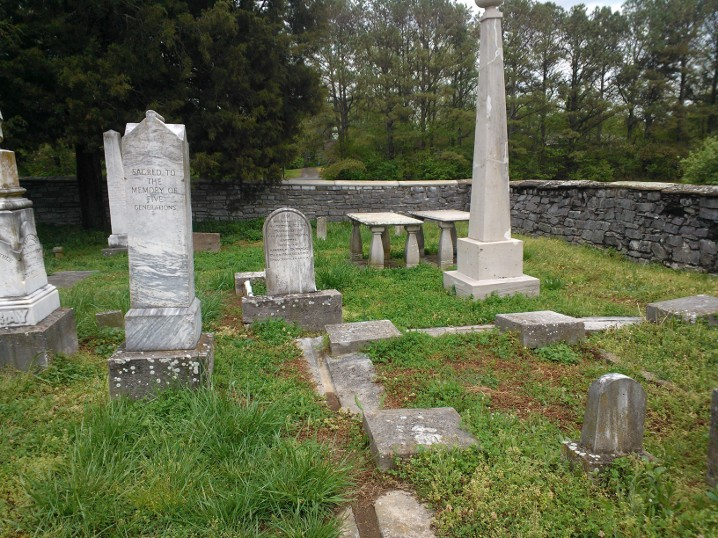
View from family cemetery entrance

Daniel and Sarah's Grave Markers

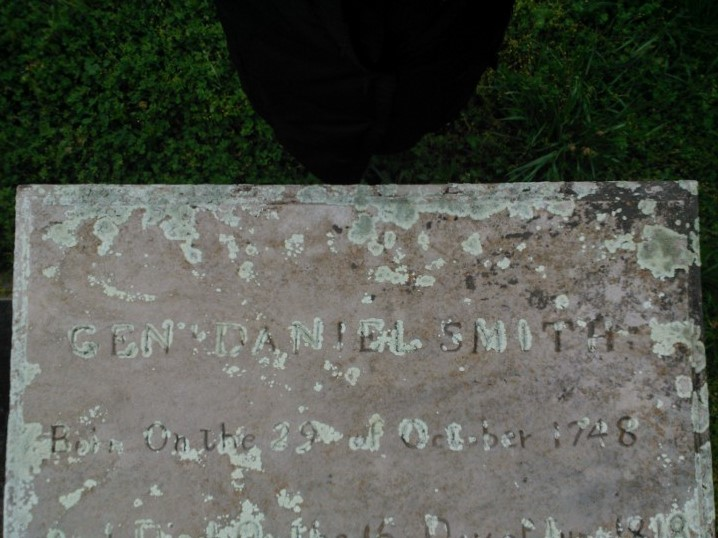
Close-up of the top of Daniel's grave marker

== Museum ==
Entrance sign

There are four original items within the mansion that belonged to the first Smiths. They are the sugar chest, the blanket chest, Senator Smith's desk and the original land grant from the State of North Carolina. One hundred of Daniel Smith's books are in the museum archives. George's sideboard and a later generation's grandfather clock is also within the mansion.

The State of Tennessee owns the property and the buildings at Rock Castle. The Tennessee Historical Commission provides a partial annual operating grant to the site and is responsible for major maintenance at the property. The Friends of Rock Castle, Inc. owns all of the artifacts.

The Friends of Rock Castle was formed in 1969 when the mansion and grounds were sold to the state from a Smith descendant. Board members take pride in the fact that Smith relatives have only owned the house. Sarah Crosby Berry was one of the founding members of the board. Each board member serves a three-year term. Most board members are very active with the site.

The Visitor Center at Rock Castle

At the time of museum creation, the State of Tennessee removed years of updates to the mansion. One update was the removal of a concrete floor in a bathroom, which turned out to be the kitchen. Sarah Berry assisted with the selection of the stones for the flooring based on her memory from when she was a child. Dormers were removed from the central portion of the house with the assumption that they were added later. However, they were actually original to that edition of the mansion, but are too expensive to restore at this point.

Most rooms are currently being interpreted from the late eighteenth century to the early nineteenth century Regency era. The room off the dining room is being interpreted as the master bedroom because it is known that later in life, the Smiths did sleep in this room. However, there is no proof that it was built and utilized as such originally. The room immediately above is being used as an exhibit room because there is no proof of use. The room where the dormers had been is extremely dark. In total, visitors are able to view all nine rooms in the house today.

== See also ==
- List of the oldest buildings in Tennessee

== Bibliography ==
- A Modest History of Rock Castle. Hendersonville: Friends of Rock Castle, 1994.
- Berry, Sarah Crosby . "Application for the Membership to the National Society of the Daughters of the American Revolution: Washington D.C." 1911. Historic Rock Castle Collection, Hendersonville, Tennessee.
- Bourne, H. A.B. The Florist's Manual: Designed as an Introduction to Vegetable Physiology and Systematic Botany, for Cultivators of Flowers with More than Eighty Beautifully-Coloured Engravings of Poetic lowers. Boston: Self Published, 1833
- Congressional Record: Proceedings and Debates of the 105th Congress, Second Session, Vol. 144/ October 15, 1998.
- Delaney, Joseph. "A Historical Study of Rock Castle." Master's Thesis, Vanderbilt University, 1972–3.
- Durham, Walter T. Daniel Smith: Frontier Statesman. Gallatin: Sumner Country Library Board, 1976.
- Glidden, Bill. in Funeral of Daniel Smith: Historic Rock Castle, Hendersonville, TN. Hendersonvill: Historic Productions, 2011.
- Kemper, Kathleen Gallagher. "Life at Rock Castle During the Civil War" in A Modest History of Rock Castle.
- "Map of the Lands of Daniel Smith's Grant. No. 56" on "Map of the Lands of Horatio Berry and Wife Nannie Berry." Nashville: Nashville Title Company, 1835. Historic Rock Castle Collection, Hendersonville, Tennessee.
- Rohde, Eleanour Sinclair. Rose Recipes from Olden Times. New York: Dover Publications, 1939.
- Smith, Daniel. "Last Will and Testament" 1818.. Historic Rock Castle Collection, Hendersonville, Tennessee.
- "Smith, Daniel, (1748-1818)", "Biographical Directory of the United States Congress: 1774-Present." United States Congress. N.d. Bioguide.congress.gov. (accessed April 25, 2013).
- Smith, George. Bill of Sale to Henry Smith. May, 1833, October 1833, Historic Rock Castle Collection, Hendersonville, Tennessee.
- Smith, Sarah Michie. letter to her husband, Daniel Smith. N.d. Historic Rock Castle Collection, Hendersonville, Tennessee.
- State of North Carolina. "No. 56. 1784. Historic Rock Castle Collection, Hendersonville, Tennessee.
- Witman, Ruth. "Tamsen Donner: A Woman's Journey". N.d. Historic Rock Castle Collection, Hendersonville, Tennessee.
