= Cheatham Lock and Dam =

Dam on the Cumberland River in Tennessee, United States

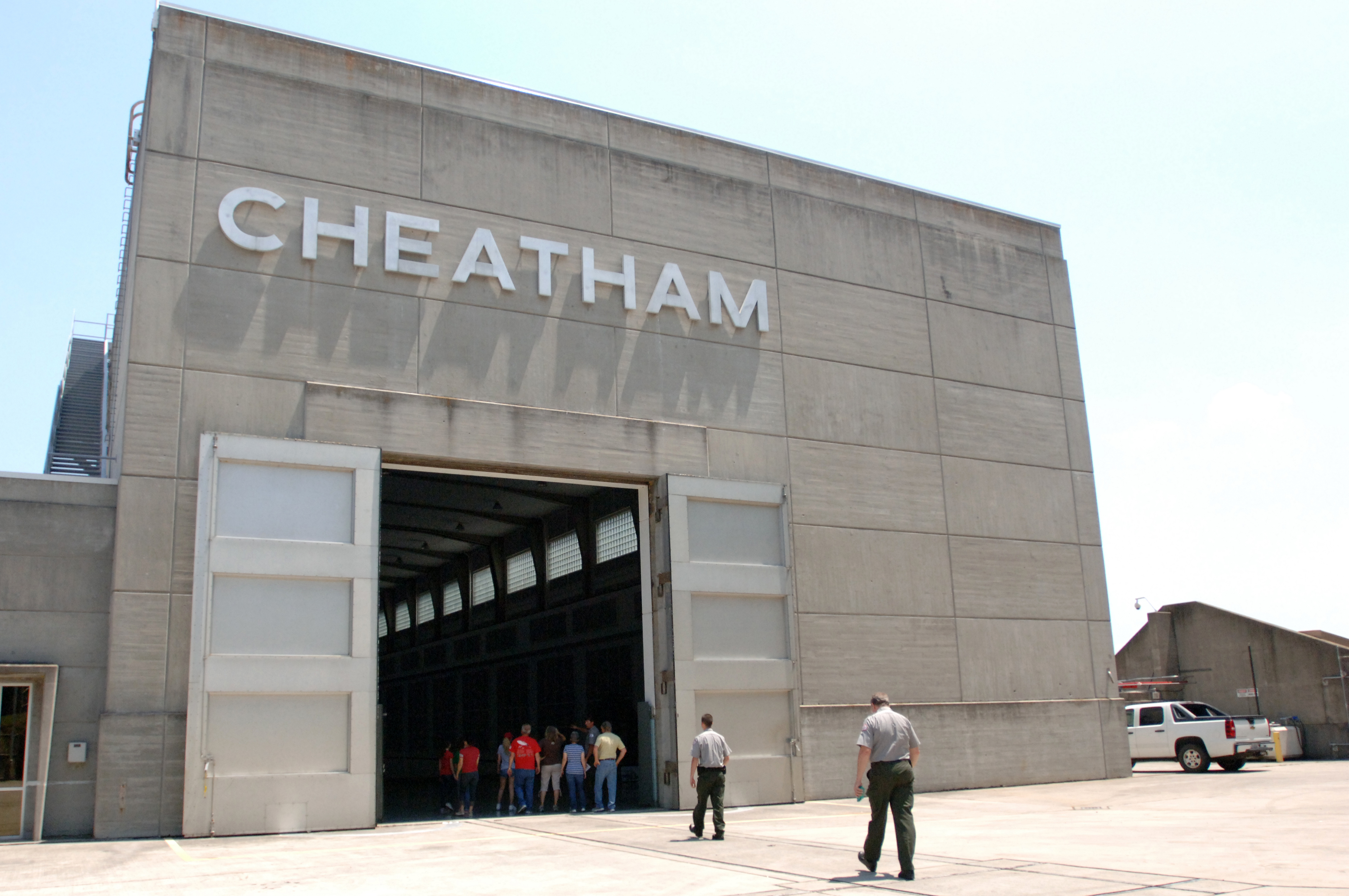
- Powerhouse at Cheatham Dam

- Location in Tennessee
- Location: Ashland City, Tennessee, U.S.
- Coordinates: 36.319785°N 87.222568°W
- Construction began: 1949
- Opening date: 1951
- Operator: USACE

Dam and spillways
- Impounds: Cumberland River

Reservoir
- Creates: Cheatham Lake

The Cheatham Lock and Dam is a dam in Ashland City, Tennessee, USA. It was built on the Cumberland River from 1949 to 1951.

Electricity from the dam is marketed by the Southeastern Power Administration.
