= Corinth =

Corinth may refer to:

== Greece ==
- Corinth (modern city)
- Ancient Corinth, the city-state in Classical Antiquity
- Battle of Corinth (146 BC)
- Battle of Corinth (1458)
- Corinth Canal
- Gulf of Corinth
- Isthmus of Corinth
- League of Corinth
- Corinth Refinery

== United States ==
=== Georgia ===
- Corinth, Georgia, an unincorporated community and former town
- Corinth, Sumter County, Georgia, a ghost town
- Corinth, Walker County, Georgia, an unincorporated community

=== North Carolina ===
- Corinth, Chatham County, North Carolina
- Corinth, Nash County, North Carolina
- Corinth, Rutherford County, North Carolina
- Banoak, North Carolina, also known as Corinth

=== Texas ===
- Corinth, Texas, a city in Denton County
- Corinth, Henderson County, Texas, a ghost town
- Corinth, Jones County, Texas, an unincorporated community
- Corinth, Lee County, Texas, an unincorporated community
- Corinth, Leon County, Texas, an unincorporated community
- Corinth, Marion County, Texas, a ghost town
- Corinth, Milam County, Texas, an unincorporated community
- Corinth, Montague County, Texas, an unincorporated community
- Corinth, Panola County, Texas, an unincorporated community
- Corinth, Van Zandt County, Texas, a ghost town
- Second Corinth, Texas

=== Other states ===
- Plantersville, Alabama, formerly known as Corinth
- Corinth, Arkansas, a town
- Corinth, Howard County, Arkansas
- Corinth, Illinois, an unincorporated community
- Corinth Township, Humboldt County, Iowa
- Corinth, Kansas, an unincorporated community
- Corinth, Kentucky, a city
- Corinth, Logan County, Kentucky
- Corinth, Louisiana, an unincorporated community
- Corinth, Maine, a town
- Corinth, Michigan, an unincorporated community in Kent County
- Corinth, Phelps County, Missouri
- Corinth, Mississippi, a city
- Corinth, Perry County, Mississippi
- Corinth, Montana, an unincorporated community
- Corinth (town), New York
- Corinth (village), New York
- Corinth, North Dakota, an unincorporated community
- Corinth, Ohio
- Corinth, South Carolina, in Oconee County
- Corinth, Saluda County, South Carolina
- Corinth, Knox County, Tennessee, an unincorporated community
- Corinth, Sumner County, Tennessee, an unincorporated community
- Corinth, Vermont, a town
- Corinth, Carroll County, Virginia
- Corinth, Southampton County, Virginia
- Corinth, West Virginia, an unincorporated community
- Corinth, Wisconsin, an unincorporated community

== Other uses ==
- Lovis Corinth, German painter
- Siege of Corinth (April–June 1862), American Civil War siege of Corinth, Mississippi
- Second Battle of Corinth (October 1862), American Civil War battle at Corinth, Mississippi
- Corinth Christian Methodist Episcopal Church, Winchester, Kentucky
- Corinth Baptist Church, Union, South Carolina
- Corinth, Pennsylvania, a fictitious city in the TV series Loving
- Corinth, a domed city that serves as the setting of the TV series Power Rangers: RPM

== See also ==
- Corinth-Holder, North Carolina
- New Corinth, Tennessee, an unincorporated community
- Corinto (disambiguation), places with Spanish or Portuguese names
- Carinthia (disambiguation), places in Central Europe
