= Corinth, Tennessee =

Corinth, Tennessee may refer to the following places in Tennessee:

- Corinth, Knox County, Tennessee
- Corinth, Sumner County, Tennessee
