= Corinth, Virginia =

Corinth, Virginia may refer to the following places in Virginia:

- Corinth, Carroll County, Virginia
- Corinth, Southampton County, Virginia
