= John Littlejohn (preacher) =

American tradesman, preacher, and politician (1756–1836)

- Born: December 7, 1756; Penrith, Cumberland, England
- Died: May 13, 1836 (aged 79); Near Corinth, Logan County, Kentucky, U.S.
- Burial place: Russellville, Kentucky, U.S.
- Occupations: Preacher; saddler; land agent; sheriff; tax collector; magistrate
- Spouse: Monica Talbott (m. 1778; died 1828)
- Children: 5
- Church: Methodist

John Littlejohn (December 7, 1756 – May 13, 1836) was an English-born American tradesman, Methodist preacher and politician. Born in Penrith, Cumberland, he briefly attended trade school in London before returning to Penrith. When Littlejohn was around twelve years old, he immigrated to British America to pursue various apprenticeships under tradesmen in Virginia and Maryland. While not particularly religious as a youth, he was inspired by Methodist revivalist sermons and began service as a circuit rider in 1776, after the outbreak of the American Revolutionary War.

As part of his preaching efforts, Littlejohn traveled across the new United States, including Virginia, Maryland, Delaware, and Washington. After several years of itinerancy he settled in Leesburg, Virginia, where Littlejohn served as a local preacher and saddler for several decades, and occasionally as a county magistrate, sheriff, and tax collector. As the Loudoun County sheriff during Britain's burning of Washington in 1814, he protected a safehouse containing the relocated National Archives, including the Constitution and Declaration of Independence. In 1818, Littlejohn moved with his family to Kentucky, where he served as a land agent, preaching alongside his work during travel across the state. He retired to Logan County in southern Kentucky, where he became a slaveholder. Littlejohn died in 1836, after sixty years of preaching.

== Early life ==
John Littlejohn was born on December 7, 1756, to a wealthy Anglican family in the town of Penrith, Cumberland. One of eight children, he initially attended Latin school. Following the collapse of his father's business, Littlejohn and his father relocated to London, where he attended school and then became the apprentice of a local tin manufacturer. Within a year, he ran away, traveling 284 miles (457 km) by foot back to his mother's home in Penrith. He became the apprentice of Thomas Broomfield, a shopkeeper based in Port Tobacco, Maryland. He crossed the Atlantic with Broomfield in 1766 or 1767, departing from Newcastle upon Tyne aboard a ship carrying convicts and indentured servants. A disease outbreak and multiple deaths aboard prolonged the journey. The ship arrived at St. Mary's after a twenty-one week passage, (Note: Typical sailing times between England and the North American colonies during the 18th century averaged around four weeks.) and Littlejohn traveled to work at Port Tobacco.

Writing retrospectively in his journals, Littlejohn described frequently gambling and playing cards in his early years in the Thirteen Colonies, abandoning religious observances instilled by his mother. In 1769, his family followed him to the colonies, first staying in Prince George's County, Maryland. His father died shortly after immigrating. Littlejohn frequently changed apprenticeships as a youth, traveling first to Northumberland County with a local saddler, then to Norfolk, Virginia, to apprentice for a harnessmaker named Eldred Fisher. In Norfolk, Littlejohn began selling "the private [pornographic] adventures of Sailors" and captured cardinal birds to sell to local sailors, using the money for gambling and cockfighting with Fisher's other apprentices.

Littlejohn began attending revival preaching, after hearing a sermon by Irish Methodist preacher Robert Williams in 1769. The mayor of Norfolk issued a ban on revivalist preaching, claiming that it would incite a slave rebellion. Due to personal opposition to slavery, Littlejohn was greatly angered by this proclamation, writing in his journal that "if I were a man, I would thrash [the mayor] for this."

Fisher died in 1772 or 1773, and Littlejohn briefly stayed in Baltimore, where his mother had relocated following his father's death. He then began an apprenticeship under Joseph Selby in Annapolis, Maryland. Here, he began regular church attendance, but had difficulties with Selby, who boarded other tradesmen and collected fines for breaching household rules in order to supply alcohol for parties. In December 1773, the seventeen-year-old Littlejohn was appointed foreman and manager at a store in Alexandria, Virginia, and he began attending regular Methodist preaching with his boss's family.

== Religious awakening ==
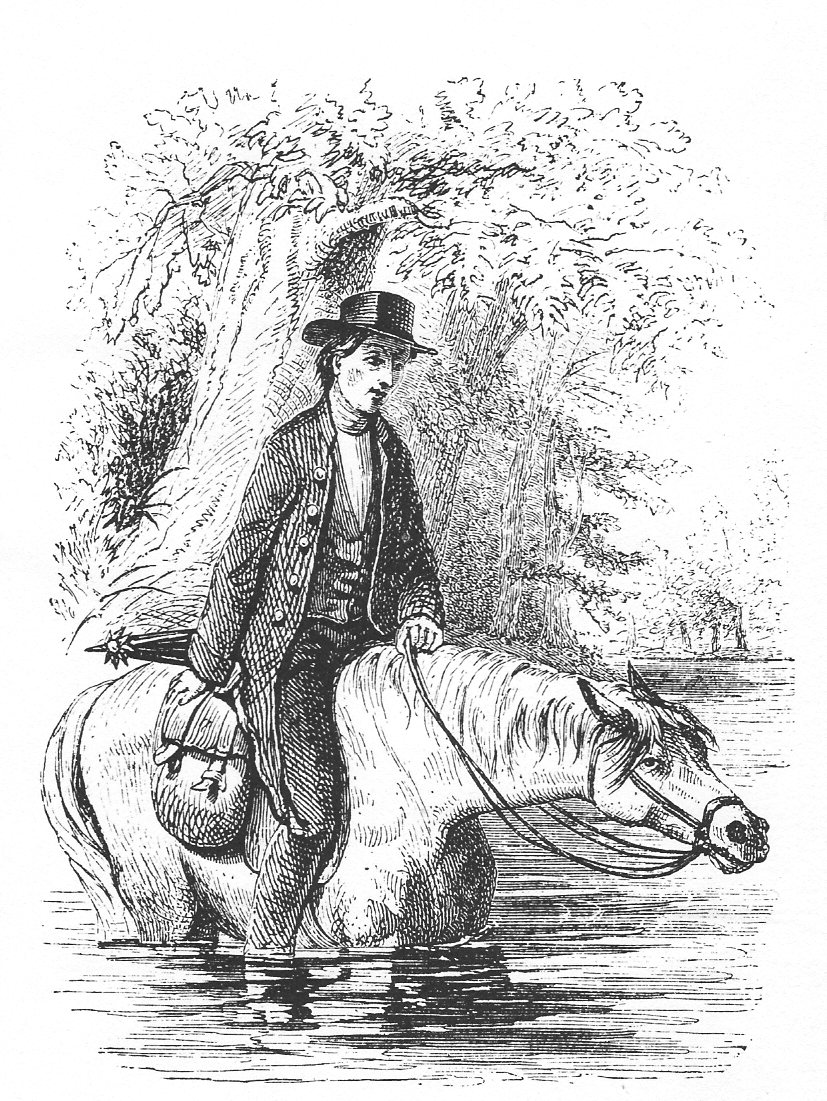
1880 depiction of a Methodist circuit rider

In 1774, Littlejohn listened to sermons from several locally notable Methodist ministers including John King and the circuit rider John Sigman. Sigman's preaching especially affected Littlejohn, who wrote "His words got to my heart as never any did before; tears gushed from my eyes as voluntary as the water from a fountain." He began to pray frequently, and reported an intense dream where he attempted to preach as armed soldiers shut down a Methodist revival in Norfolk, only to be pelted with stones by a mob as he climbed the timbers of a house to escape. Littlejohn was greatly inspired by this dream, and took it as a divine signal of future persecution of Methodists and his duty to become a preacher, although he continued to struggle with self-doubt. Two months later, in October 1774, he reported returning home from evening preaching and hearing a voice call his name, with another whispering "Thy Sins be forgiven thee" as he arose from his bed.

Littlejohn initially took a cautious outlook on this dream, but felt a rush of joy and reassurance a week later. Littlejohn confided in Sigman about the experience, writing that he felt redeemed as a Christian and wished to join the Methodist fellowship. On November 20, 1774, he joined with itinerant preacher William Duke to found Alexandria's first Methodist society. Soon after, he partnered with two other young Methodists to establish a regular prayer circle at a "large thatched pen" in Falls Church, drawing several hundreds from the surrounding area. These activities led to conflicts with the local magistrates and an Anglican minister.

He was dismayed to find his strongly Anglican mother's displeasure in his pursuit of Methodism. Depressed, he began to fear that his preaching had disgraced the gospel and considered drowning himself. He ultimately continued in his duties, with Reverend William Watters appointing him to the Fairfax County circuit in 1775 or early 1776. (Note: Prior to 1789, Fairfax County included Arlington County, including the now-independent cities of Alexandria and Falls Church.) In the spring of 1776, he was appointed as an itinerant-in-training, and accompanied Watters on the Berkeley circuit, in what is now part of West Virginia. Setting out on his own later that year, he traveled across much of Virginia preaching. Initially serving in Fairfax County, he was reassigned to southern Virginia at Petersburg, preaching in various localities as he traveled south. In November 1776, he wrote in his journal a list of nine resolutions to follow daily, including waking up as early as possible, avoiding the discussion of worldly matters, and reading the Bible daily. Such sets of resolutions were common for Methodist circuit riders.

In 1777, he preached to a large mixed-race assembly in Richmond. Cries and exclamations from Black worshipers frightened the white congregation, and Littlejohn continued preaching to an all-Black audience after white attendees vacated the service. Littlejohn left Virginia in 1777 and returned to Maryland. While on the Baltimore Circuit, he made trips to York County, Pennsylvania, preaching near New Freedom.

=== American Revolution and persecution ===
I wish 'em [the Loyalists] safe out of the Country, for w^{t} all their
confidence in the British cause, I feel they are mistaken,
the [American] cause is Gods.

— John Littlejohn, in his journal, August 1777

As the Revolutionary War began, Methodist preachers fell under increasing scrutiny from Patriot authorities. Although Methodists were not pacifists, emphasis on "passive nonresistance" led to many refusing military service in either military force. American magistrates fined and imprisoned many for preaching and refusal of service, believing John Wesley, and Methodists generally, held Loyalist sympathies. In June 1775, an Anne Arundel magistrate fined Littlejohn for traveling without a pass, condemning John Wesley and describing Methodist preachers as Tories.

Writing while in Baltimore in early 1777, Littlejohn described feeling as a "fatherless child, abandoned by my friends" due to his preaching and refusal of military service, despite sympathies for the Patriots. Beyond Littlejohn, few Methodist preachers actively supported the revolutionary movement due to prevailing pacifism. Littlejohn cautioned fellow Methodist preachers against judging the revolutionaries, writing on July 4, 1777, that "those that were willing to defend their rights had more power of religion than any others I have met on this side of the Rappahannock." Repression intensified as fighting in Maryland increased, with many circuit riders ceasing travel out of fear of harassment and interrogation. The Act for the Better Security of the Government, passed in December 1777 by the Maryland legislature, required an oath of allegiance to the state government by all free men over eighteen, barring those who refused from various professions, including preaching, law, and public service. The law additionally issued a tax on rejectors' property. Similar requirements of oath were also passed in Delaware and Pennsylvania. When asked to take the oath by a Methodist colonel, Littlejohn supplied his own draft of a separate oath that he would agree to adhere to. Despite the urging of his friends, he refused to swear the oath to the state, and was one of twenty preachers indicted in a single October 1778 case of the Annapolis-based General Court of the Western Shore.

Littlejohn was among eleven Methodist preachers listed in a 1779 summons by the General Court, but all were able to evade attendance. The itinerant nature of the preachers meant many simply left the jurisdiction before trials could progress. The court's unpopularity led to jurors and witnesses refusing to make the journey, preferring local courts and refusing summons to Annapolis when they were issued. Additionally, the increasing popularity of Methodism in Maryland (Note: In 1777, over 6,000 Americans were members of Methodist societies, with around half in Virginia and roughly a third in Delaware and Maryland. By the end of the war in 1782, membership had doubled to nearly 12,000.) led to some juries refusing to indict preachers. Attempted repression of circuit riders lightened as the war continued, with lower courts seldom indicting the preachers. Maryland Methodists were officially exempted from oath requirements and bans on preaching by an act of the Maryland General Assembly in November 1782.

== Leesburg ==
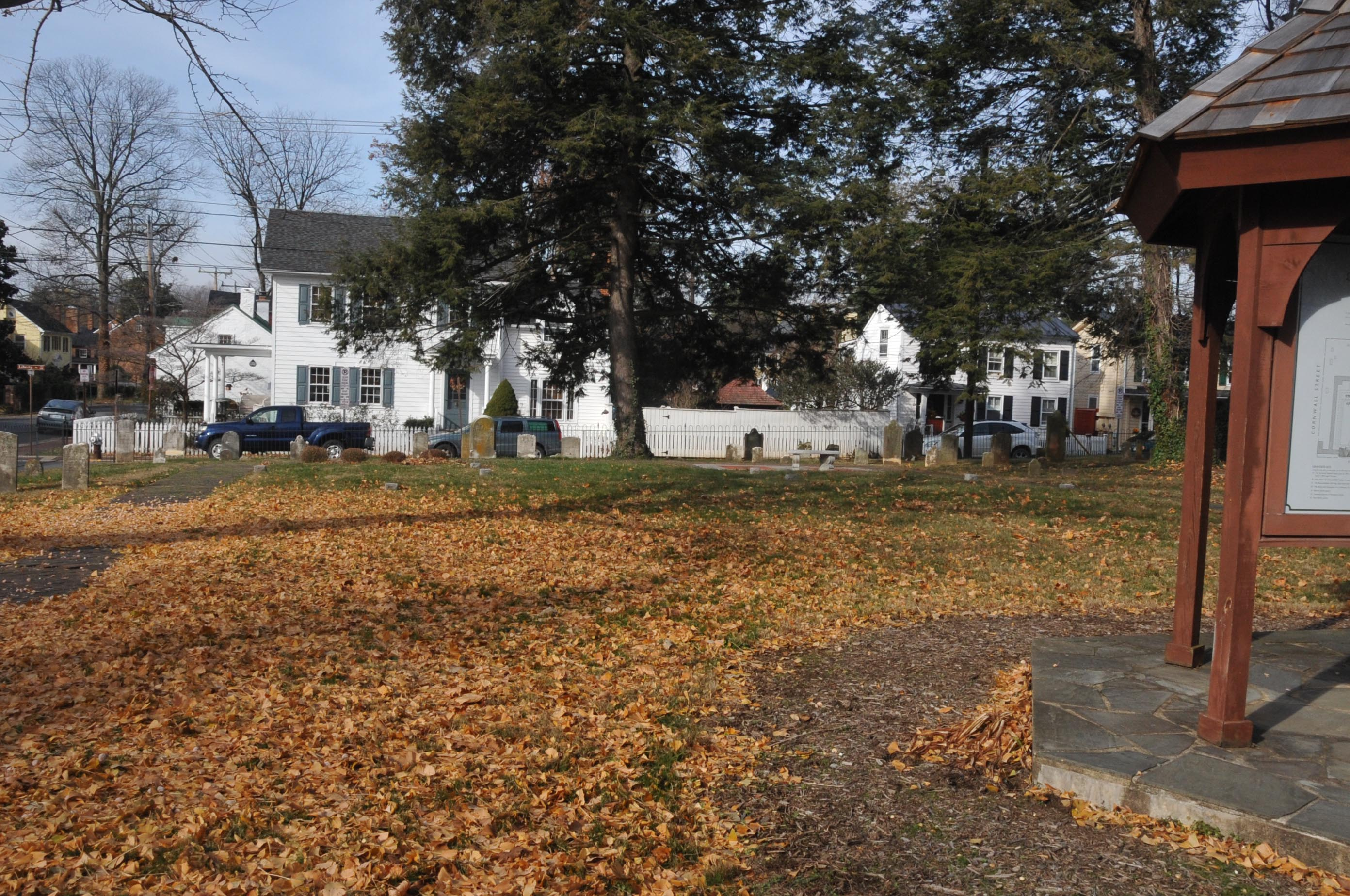
The Old Stone Church Site in Leesburg, where Littlejohn preached. The first Methodist church in the United States was built here in 1768.

Littlejohn was promoted from probationary to full membership in the Methodist conference in May 1778. While regarding it as temptation to sin, he had considered settling down since early in his career, although received a negative response on the prospect from preacher George Shadford in 1776. In June 1778, he met with Bishop Francis Asbury in Delaware and asked him about locating; Littlejohn was instead sent by Asbury to return to the Baltimore circuit.

In letters sent in 1778, various other Methodists cautioned him against locating, with one settled preacher expressing deep regret. He was alarmed at the response from his fellow preachers, and decided to continue traveling. He met with his mother in Baltimore, who threatened to disown him if he did not stop itinerant preaching and return with her to England. Littlejohn refused, and traveled in August 1778, to propose to Monica Talbott, the daughter of a Fairfax Methodist whom he had first met several years prior. Monica initially refused his advances, asking that his affections be abandoned. Staying at the Talbott residence the following day due to a storm, Littlejohn was able to eventually convince Monica to marry him. When appointed to circuit ride in Maryland, Littlejohn declined, considering it improper for a married preacher.

I have known the Rev. Mr. Littlejohn to finish a saddle,
preside on the bench as a magistrate, preach a funeral sermon,
baptize a child, and perform a marriage ceremony, all on the same day.

— Col. Armistead Thomson Mason

John Littlejohn and Monica married in December 1778, settling at Leesburg in Loudoun County, Virginia, where he would serve as a local preacher for the next three decades. While preaching, he was generally not bound to a specific church, traveling through the local area to serve at baptisms, weddings, and funerals. He continued employment in the trades in order to supply for his family, including twins born in September 1789, as well as Monica's two sisters staying with the household.

He had many friends in Leesburg, some of whom he had known prior in Norfolk, having migrated north due to wartime conditions. Following the birth of his children, rumors of monetary problems led to an offer from Anglican planter Bryan Fairfax, promising ordination within the Church of England and material benefits from glebe in return for assuming responsibility for two local parishes. Littlejohn refused, but continued positive relations with the Anglican church, despite the official denominational separation following the formation of an independent Methodist church in December 1784.

=== War of 1812 ===
In addition to becoming a well-established local preacher, Littlejohn served in various civil positions, including county magistrate and sheriff. During the War of 1812, he served as a tax collector for the twenty-second district of Virginia, collecting a series of federal property taxes levied following the wartime resumption of federal taxation. These were not levied after 1816, but he continued as a nominal tax collector until moving to Kentucky in 1818.

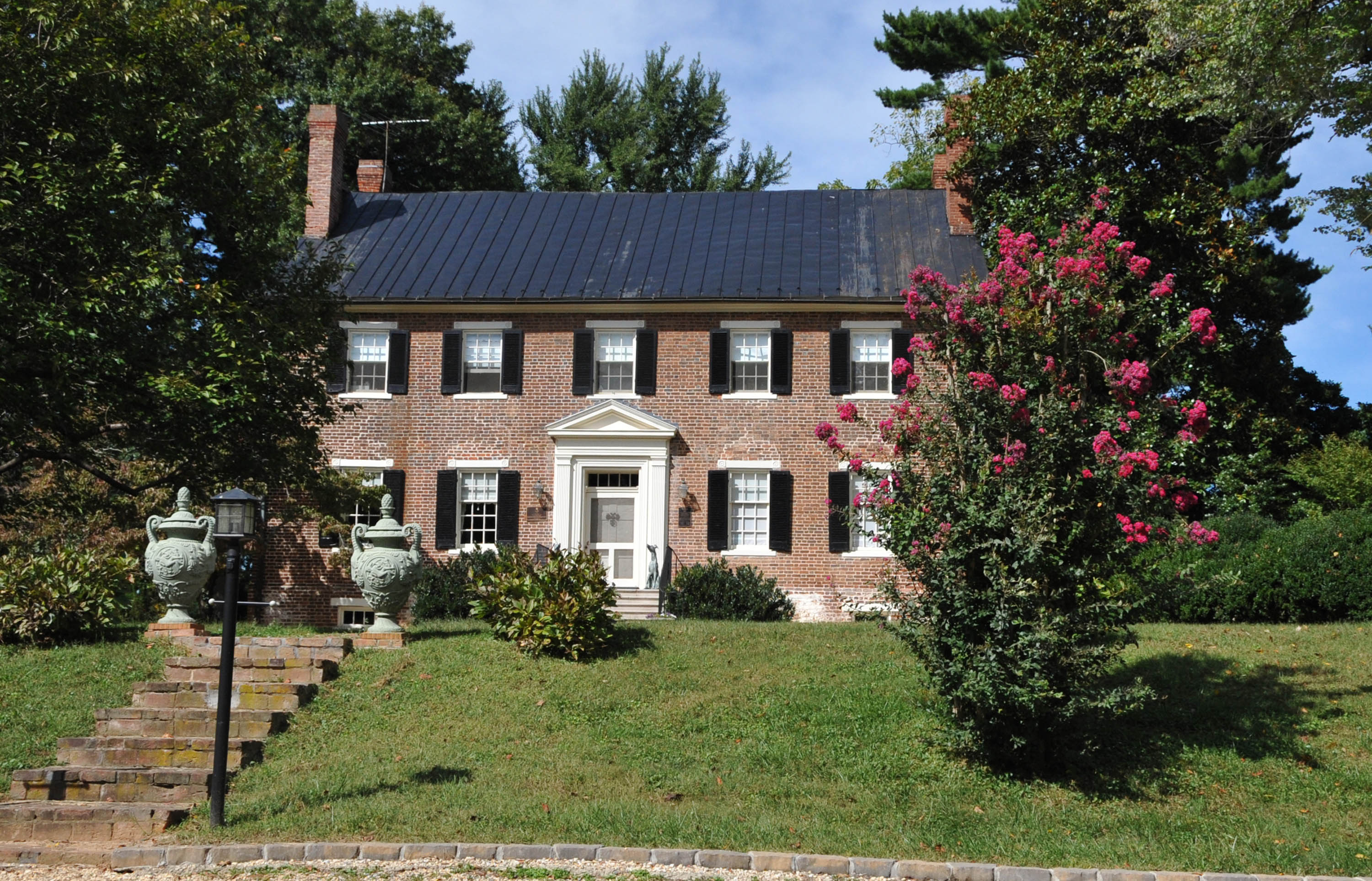
Rokeby, one of several possible houses where the National Archives were stored under Littlejohn's watch

Prior to the British burning of Washington in August 1814, the federal government evacuated the National Archives, including crucial founding documents such as the Declaration of Independence, Constitution, and Bill of Rights. Stephen Pleasonton, a Treasury Department official tasked with protecting the documents, initially hid them inside an Alexandria County gristmill adjacent to the Chain Bridge. The presence of an armament foundry nearby prompted fears of a British attack, and the archives were moved further west to a vacant house in or adjacent to Leesburg. Local sources have traditionally cited Rokeby, although some historians have proposed the location to be another vacant house within Leesburg itself. On August 25, the day following the British occupation of Washington, Littlejohn was given the keys to the home and tasked with supervising them. Littlejohn supervised the documents for two weeks before they were collected and returned to Washington after British forces withdrew from the city.

== Kentucky and later life ==
Wishing to have more property to divide among his children in inheritance, Littlejohn and his family purchased land and departed Leesburg for Kentucky in early September 1818. On October 29, Littlejohn and his wife arrived by boat in Louisville after delays due to low water, meeting his son Thomas, who had arrived several weeks earlier with various household goods. Upon discovering that Louisville residents had been raising money in reward for his preaching while in town, he wrote that he "begged it might be stopted [...] I could not think of prostrating the charrecter of a Local Methodist Preecher for Money." Littlejohn refused an offer from to be stationed as a preacher in Louisville. From there on, Littlejohn traveled to Christian County, where he discovered land acquired from a fellow Methodist was unsuitable for farming and falsely advertised. The family instead settled in Warren County, near Bowling Green, where his son had purchased additional land.

In 1819, he briefly returned to Leesburg to make trips to Washington City and Georgetown, where he conducted six marriages in less than two months. His host in Leesburg connected him with contacts in Virginia, and Littlejohn was hired to serve as a land agent in Kentucky. Upon returning to his family in December, they moved to Logan County, to a site on the Red River later identified with the unincorporated community of Corinth. Traveling within Southwestern Kentucky, he continued to preach while simultaneously serving as a land agent. He embarked on another journey from February to April 1820, traveling from Louisville to the Bluegrass on land inspection business. Staying with various family and business contacts, he traveled in a loop throughout the region. He visited Lexington, the state capital at Frankfort, and various other smaller Bluegrass settlements. He frequently lodged in Bourbon County, where he stayed with a colonel who had moved to the area from Loudoun County. Littlejohn, then in his late sixties, continued to work as a land agent throughout the 1820s, splitting time between itinerant preaching, attending land auctions, and assessing the quality and boundaries of land tracts. He additionally made money by charging fees for marriage ceremonies as he traveled. Following the theft of a prized horse in 1821, Littlejohn tracked the animal across Kentucky and Indiana, eventually recovering it in Lawrenceburg.

Monica Littlejohn died on January 16, 1828, and was buried at Russellville. Their son Lewis died that August, leaving behind a young daughter. Captain Hunter, a business contact of Littlejohn in Franklin County, took the girl in. In June 1830, Littlejohn arrived and preached at his old hometown in Leesburg, staying there until May 1831 and attending the Methodist general conference in Washington. Here he was granted readmission as a superannuated preacher to his original Baltimore Conference, although he returned to the Kentucky Conference in 1832. Despite previous opposition to the practice, Littlejohn purchased several slaves in his old age. The 1830 Census recorded his household as having seven slaves, including two children.

== Death and legacy ==
John Littlejohn died at his home in Logan County on May 13, 1836, possibly of cholera, and was buried in Russellville at the same graveyard as his wife. An obituary was later published in the Minutes of the Annual Conferences of the Methodist Episcopal Church. Littlejohn's death was preceded by all of his children except John, who died the following year at age 21. Most of Littlejohn's estate was willed to his son John, and granddaughter Catherine; however, his three granddaughters each inherited one slave, and John received two enslaved boys. Each slave was prescribed to be manumitted at the age of 25.

By the 1960s, his gravesite had fallen into disrepair, prompting the Kentucky Historical Society to partner with a local Methodist congregation to restore the site, with a new gravestone carved by a local Methodist surveyor. Bishop Roy Short of the Louisville Methodist Conference held a group prayer and dedication of the new gravestone on October 31, 1965. In October 2008, the Logan County Garden Club and Kentucky Historical Society unveiled a historical marker to mark his gravesite.
