= Corinth, Georgia (disambiguation) =

Corinth, Georgia may refer to the following places in the U.S. state of Georgia:

- Corinth, Georgia, an unincorporated community and former town in Coweta and Heard counties
- Corinth, Sumter County, Georgia, a ghost town
- Corinth, Walker County, Georgia, an unincorporated community
