= Bon Air, Tennessee =

Bon Air, Tennessee may refer to:

- Bon Air, Sumner County, Tennessee
- Bon Air, White County, Tennessee
