= Shackle Island, Tennessee =

- Census-designated place
- Location within Tennessee
- Coordinates: 36°22′14″N 86°37′00″W
- Country: United States
- State: Tennessee
- County: Sumner

Area
  - Total: 5.55 sq mi (14.38 km^{2})
  - Land: 5.55 sq mi (14.38 km^{2})
  - Water: 0 sq mi (0.00 km^{2})
- Elevation: 518 ft (158 m)

Population (2020)
  - Total: 3,331
  - Density: 599.9/sq mi (231.64/km^{2})
- Time zone: UTC-6 (Central (CST))
  - Summer (DST): UTC-5 (CDT)
- Area code(s): 615, 629
- GNIS feature ID: 1315896

Shackle Island is a census-designated place and unincorporated community in Sumner County, Tennessee, United States. Its population was 3,331 as of the 2020 census Shackle Island is in central Tennessee, north of Nashville near the Kentucky border.

== History ==
The earliest reference to the name "Shackle Island" was June 8, 1797, when surveyor William Lytle recorded a North Carolina land grant to William Tyrrell. He wrote, "Beginning at a sweet gum, honey locust, and elm standing on an island. . . on the West side below the Great Road". The great road he referred to was Long Hollow Pike, and the body of water that created the island was Drake's Creek . An 1878 county map (below) labels the site "Shackle Island" and shows Long Hollow Pike running east-west through it. The name became official when the post office recognized it in 1900.

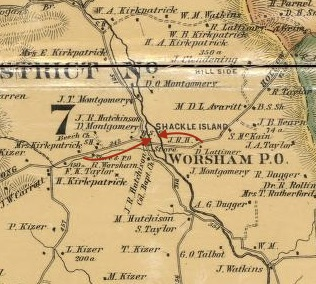
Shackle Island, Sumner County, Tennessee, 1878. Arrows show bifurcation of Drake's Creek to create an island (see coordinates above).

The “Island” was made by Drake’s Creek, flowing south toward the Cumberland River. Centuries ago the creek's path split into two channels (see image) thereby creating a small section of land in between them that made the “island” Lytle described. Over time, the two channels recombined. As of 2016, the eastern branch has largely disappeared but remains identifiable.

The origin of “Shackle” is uncertain. One local legend attributes it to a small shack on an island in the creek where illegal whiskey was sold, but this explanation has been discounted, as even the earliest settlers referred to the area as “Shackle Island.” Another unproven theory suggests the name derived from a site where enslaved people were held, referencing the fact that hundreds of enslaved individuals were marched through Tennessee to western markets. The Tennessee State Archives and Museum holds one documented connection to a distillery in the area: a letter from Dr. Joshua Franklin to Daniel Montgomery (born 1789) ordering one dollar’s worth of whiskey for medicinal use. Montgomery operated the distillery along with a farm, sawmill, and gristmill. He died in 1855 at Shackle Island and is buried in nearby Beech Cemetery."

== Incidents with Native Americans ==
To receive land granted for their service in the Revolutionary War, many Americans traveled from the north over the Cumberland Mountains to establish settlements on their new property. Many traveled along Sumner County creeks like Drakes, Manskers, Bledsoe, and Station Camp, all leading to the Cumberland River. The Cumberland was a gateway west to Texas, or south to New Orleans. In the last half of the eighteenth century, the White settlers of Sumner County were in constant peril of Native American attacks, and never ventured from home without being armed. Attacks by Native Americans in this area peaked from 1780 to 1800. The Cherokees and the Creeks were constantly on the war path and incidents with them were recorded to strengthen the case for militia protection for the residents. In April, 1788, three sons of William Montgomery were killed and scalped on Shackle Island at Drake's Creek.

== Demographics ==
Historical population
Census	Pop.	Note	%±
2020	3,331		—
U.S. Decennial Census

=== 2020 census ===
Shackle Island racial composition
Race	Number	Percentage
White (non-Hispanic)	2,910	87.36%
Black or African American (non-Hispanic)	138	4.14%
Native American	4	0.12%
Asian	37	1.11%
Pacific Islander	1	0.03%
Other/Mixed	117	3.51%
Hispanic or Latino	124	3.72%

As of the 2020 census, Shackle Island had a population of 3,331. The median age was 43.8 years. 24.5% of residents were under the age of 18 and 15.8% of residents were 65 years of age or older. For every 100 females there were 95.9 males, and for every 100 females age 18 and over there were 93.3 males age 18 and over.

66.8% of residents lived in urban areas, while 33.2% lived in rural areas.

There were 1,124 households in Shackle Island, of which 37.5% had children under the age of 18 living in them. Of all households, 80.6% were married-couple households, 5.0% were households with a male householder and no spouse or partner present, and 11.5% were households with a female householder and no spouse or partner present. About 8.8% of all households were made up of individuals and 4.2% had someone living alone who was 65 years of age or older. There were 916 families.

There were 1,141 housing units, of which 1.5% were vacant. The homeowner vacancy rate was 0.7% and the rental vacancy rate was 0.0%.

== Geography ==
Shackle Island is located in the southwestern portion of Sumner County at the crossroad intersection of Tennessee State Routes 174 and 258, about 4 miles (6.4 km) north of Hendersonville.
