= Sumner County, Tennessee =

County in Tennessee, United States

- County
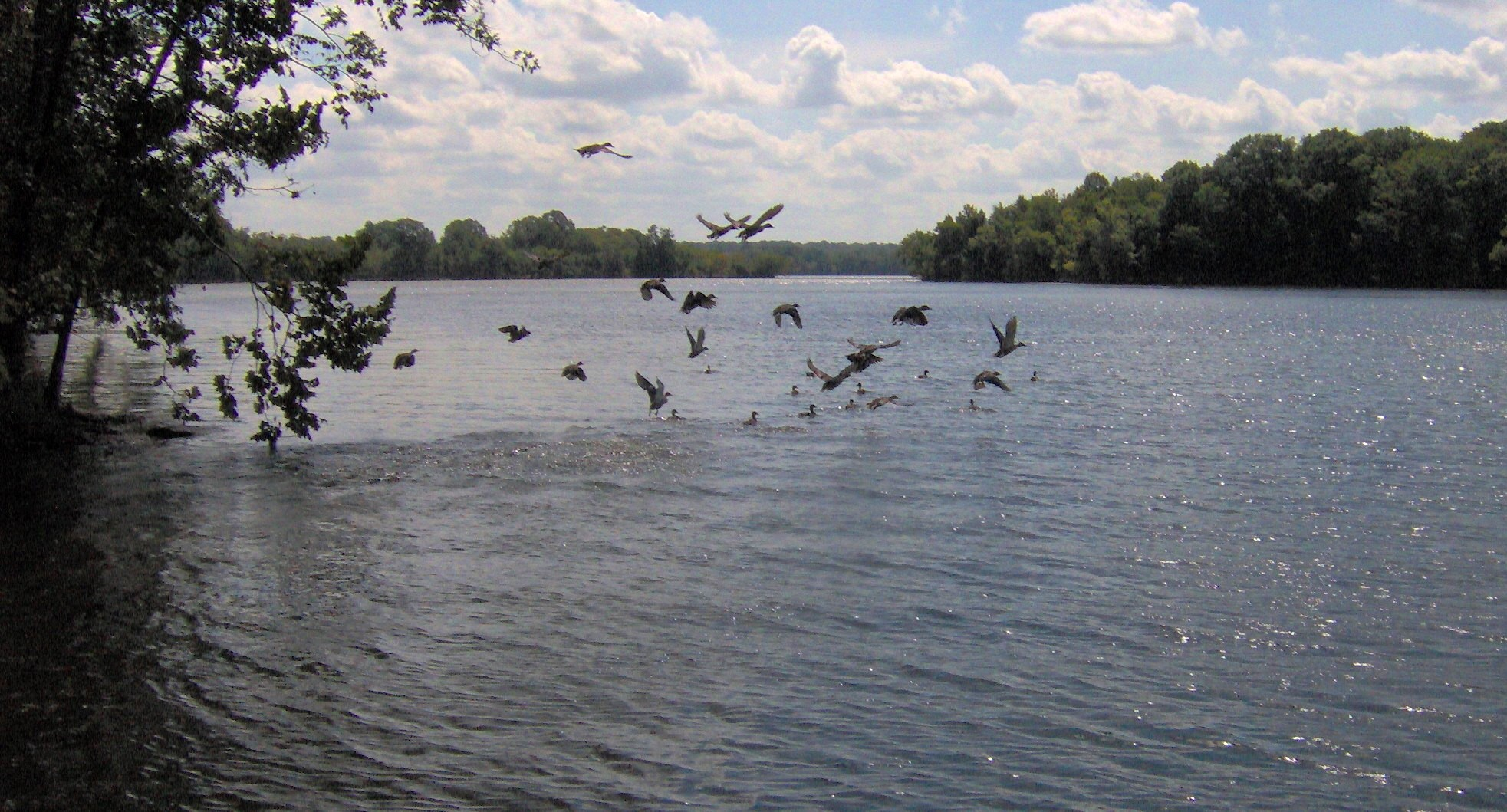
- Old Hickory Lake at Bledsoe Creek State Park

- Flag Seal

- Location within the U.S. state of Tennessee
- Coordinates: 36°28′N 86°28′W
- Country: United States
- State: Tennessee
- Founded: November 1786
- Named for: Jethro Sumner
- Seat: Gallatin
- Largest city: Hendersonville

Area
  - Total: 543 sq mi (1,410 km^{2})
  - Land: 529 sq mi (1,370 km^{2})
  - Water: 14 sq mi (36 km^{2}) 2.5%

Population (2020)
  - Total: 196,281
  - Estimate (2025): 215,538 ▲
  - Density: 371/sq mi (143/km^{2})
- Area code: 615, 629
- Congressional district: 6th
- Website: sumnercountytn.gov

Sumner County is a county located on the central northern border of Tennessee in the United States. As of the 2020 United States census, the population was 196,281. Its county seat is Gallatin, and its most populous city is Hendersonville. The county is named after an American Revolutionary War hero, General Jethro Sumner.

Sumner County is part of the Nashville metropolitan area. The county is made up of eight cities, including Gallatin, Goodlettsville, Hendersonville, Millersville, Mitchellville, Portland, Westmoreland, and White House. Sumner County is 25 miles (40 km) northeast of Nashville, Tennessee.

== History ==
Prior to the European colonization of North America, the county had been inhabited by various cultures of Native Americans for several thousand years. Nomadic Paleo and Archaic hunter-gatherer campsites, as well as substantial Woodland and Mississippian-period occupation sites and burial grounds, can be found scattered throughout the county. The majority of these sites exist along natural waterways, with the highest concentration occurring along what is now known as the Cumberland River. Mississippian period earthwork mounds can still be seen in Hendersonville, and most notably, at Castalian Springs. Long before Europeans entered the area, Native Americans made use of the natural springs for their medicinal and healing properties.

Longhunters traveled into the area as early as the 1760s, following existing Indian and buffalo trails. By the early 1780s, they had erected several trading posts in the region. The most prominent was Mansker's Station, which was built by Kasper Mansker near a salt lick (where modern Goodlettsville would later develop). Isaac Bledsoe built Bledsoe's Station at Castilian Springs. Around the same time Captain William Asher established Asher’s Station along Station Camp Creek near modern Gallatin. Together, these three stations served as the first defensive forts erected in what would later become Sumner County. The county was officially organized in 1786, just 3 years after the end of the American Revolutionary War, when Tennessee was still the western part of North Carolina.

During the 19th century, the county was developed for agriculture: tobacco and hemp, and blooded livestock. Numerous settlers came from central Kentucky's Bluegrass Region, where these were the most important products. Middle Tennessee had fertile lands that could be used for similar crops and supported high-quality livestock as well. The larger planters depended on the labor of enslaved African Americans. Infrastructure built to support the housing of slaves during this time still exists in Gallatin.

During the American Civil War, most of Tennessee was occupied by Union troops from 1862. This led to a breakdown in civil order in many areas. The Union commander, Eleazer A. Paine, was based at Gallatin, the county seat. He was notoriously cruel and had suspected spies publicly executed without trial in the town square. He was eventually replaced because of his mistreatment of the people.

In 1873, the county was hit hard by the fourth cholera pandemic of the century, which had begun about 1863 in Asia. It eventually reached North America and was spread by steamboat passengers who traveled throughout the waterways, especially in the South on the Mississippi River and its tributaries. An estimated 120 persons died of cholera in Sumner County in 1873, mostly during the summer. The disease was spread mainly through contaminated water, due to the lack of sanitation. About four-fifths of the county's victims were African Americans. Many families, both black and white, lost multiple members. In the United States overall, about 50,000 persons died of cholera in the 1870s.

On April 17 and 27, 2019, eight bodies were discovered at multiple locations in Sumner County. The sole survivor, left in critical condition, died in 2022 due to major health problems after the injuries. A suspect, identified as Michael Cummins, was arrested for all nine attacks.

== Geography ==
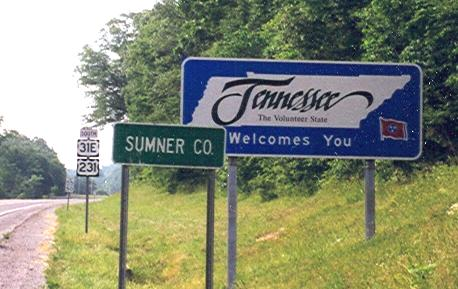
Signs indicating the Tennessee State and Sumner County borders

According to the U.S. Census Bureau, the county has a total area of 543 square miles (1,410 km^{2}), of which 529 square miles (1,370 km^{2}) is land and 14 square miles (36 km^{2}) (2.5%) is water.

Sumner County is located in Middle Tennessee on the state's northern border with Kentucky. The Cumberland River was important in early trade and transportation for this area, as it flows into the Ohio River to the west. That leads to the Mississippi River, and downriver to the major port of New Orleans. Sumner County is in the Greater Nashville metropolitan area.

=== Adjacent counties ===
- Davidson County (southwest)
- Macon County (east)
- Robertson County (west)
- Trousdale County (southeast)
- Wilson County (south)
- Allen County, Kentucky (northeast)
- Simpson County, Kentucky (northwest)

=== State protected areas ===
- Bledsoe Creek State Park
- Cragfont State Historic Site
- Gallatin Steam Plant Wildlife Management Area
- Old Hickory Lock and Dam Wildlife Management Area (part)
- Rock Castle State Historic Site
- Taylor Hollow State Natural Area
- Wynnewood State Historic Site

=== Highways ===
- I-65
- US 31W
- US 31E
- US 41
- US 231
- SR 25
- SR 52
- SR 76
- SR 109
- SR 174
- SR 257
- SR 258
- SR 259
- SR 386

== Demographics ==
Historical population
Census	Pop.	Note	%±
1790	2,196		—
1800	4,616		110.2%
1810	13,792		198.8%
1820	19,211		39.3%
1830	20,569		7.1%
1840	22,415		9.0%
1850	22,717		1.3%
1860	22,030		−3.0%
1870	23,711		7.6%
1880	23,625		−0.4%
1890	23,668		0.2%
1900	26,072		10.2%
1910	25,621		−1.7%
1920	27,708		8.1%
1930	28,622		3.3%
1940	32,719		14.3%
1950	33,533		2.5%
1960	36,217		8.0%
1970	56,106		54.9%
1980	85,790		52.9%
1990	103,281		20.4%
2000	130,449		26.3%
2010	160,645		23.1%
2020	196,281		22.2%
2025 (est.)	215,538	▲	9.8%
U.S. Decennial Census; 1790-1960 1900–1990; 1990-2000 2010–2020

=== Racial and ethnic composition ===
Sumner County, Tennessee – Racial and ethnic composition Note: the US Census treats Hispanic/Latino as an ethnic category. This table excludes Latinos from the racial categories and assigns them to a separate category. Hispanics/Latinos may be of any race.
Race / ethnicity (NH = Non-Hispanic)	Pop 1980	Pop 1990	Pop 2000	Pop 2010	Pop 2020	% 1980	% 1990	% 2000	% 2010	% 2020
White alone (NH)	79,925	96,630	118,221	139,693	155,169	93.16%	93.56%	90.63%	86.96%	79.05%
Black or African American alone (NH)	5,044	5,539	7,488	10,213	15,537	5.88%	5.36%	5.74%	6.36%	7.92%
Native American or Alaska Native alone (NH)	100	185	342	406	476	0.12%	0.18%	0.26%	0.25%	0.24%
Asian alone (NH)	146	345	849	1,616	2,932	0.17%	0.33%	0.65%	1.01%	1.49%
Native Hawaiian or Pacific Islander alone (NH)	x	x	32	93	116	x	x	0.02%	0.06%	0.06%
Other race alone (NH)	64	15	134	168	655	0.07%	0.01%	0.10%	0.10%	0.33%
Mixed race or Multiracial (NH)	x	x	1,092	2,148	8,526	x	x	0.84%	1.34%	4.34%
Hispanic or Latino (any race)	511	567	2,291	6,308	12,870	0.60%	0.55%	1.76%	3.93%	6.56%
Total	85,790	103,281	130,449	160,645	196,281	100.00%	100.00%	100.00%	100.00%	100.00%

=== 2020 census ===
As of the 2020 census, there were 196,281 people, 74,472 households, and 51,272 families residing in the county.

The median age was 39.5 years; 23.8% of residents were under the age of 18 and 16.5% of residents were 65 years of age or older. For every 100 females there were 94.6 males, and for every 100 females age 18 and over there were 92.0 males age 18 and over.

The racial makeup of the county was 80.5% White, 8.0% Black or African American, 0.4% American Indian and Alaska Native, 1.5% Asian, 0.1% Native Hawaiian and Pacific Islander, 2.7% from some other race, and 6.8% from two or more races. Hispanic or Latino residents of any race comprised 6.6% of the population.

74.7% of residents lived in urban areas, while 25.3% lived in rural areas.

There were 74,472 households in the county, of which 33.9% had children under the age of 18 living in them. Of all households, 54.7% were married-couple households, 15.0% were households with a male householder and no spouse or partner present, and 24.3% were households with a female householder and no spouse or partner present. About 22.6% of all households were made up of individuals and 9.5% had someone living alone who was 65 years of age or older.

There were 78,995 housing units, of which 5.7% were vacant. Among occupied housing units, 71.6% were owner-occupied and 28.4% were renter-occupied. The homeowner vacancy rate was 1.3% and the rental vacancy rate was 7.8%.

=== 2010 census ===
As of the census of 2010, there were 160,645 people, 60,975 households, and 44,593 families living in the county. The population density was 303.68 persons per square mile (117.25 persons/km^{2}). The housing unit density was 115.26 units per square mile (44.50 units/km^{2}). The racial makeup of the county was 89.67% White, 6.42% African American, 1.02% Asian, 0.29% Native American, 0.07% Pacific Islander, and 1.45% from two or more races. Those of Hispanic or Latino origins constituted 3.93% of the population.

Out of all of the households, 26.08% had children under the age of 18 living in them, 57.05% were married couples, 4.37% had a male householder with no wife present, 11.72% had a female householder with no husband present, and 26.87% were non-families. 22.07% of all householders were made up of individuals, and 8.29% were one person aged 65 or older. The average household size was 2.61 and the average family size was 3.05.

The age distribution was 25.29% under the age of 18, 62.10% ages 18 to 64, and 12.61% ages 65 and over. The median age was 38.6 years. 51.20% of the population were females, and 48.80% were males.

The median household income in the county was $54,916, and the median family income was $65,313. Males had a median income of $46,606, versus $35,256 for females. The per capita income was $26,014. About 7.3% of families and 10.1% of the population were below the poverty line, including 13.9% of those under the age of 18 and 9.4% of those age 65 and over.

=== 2000 census ===
At the 2000 census there were 130,449 people, 48,941 households, and 37,048 families living in the county. The population density was 246 people per square mile (95 people/km^{2}). There were 51,657 housing units at an average density of 98 units per square mile (38/km^{2}). The racial makeup of the county was 91.49% White, 5.78% Black or African American, 0.29% Native American, 0.66% Asian, 0.03% Pacific Islander, 0.80% from other races, and 0.96% from two or more races. 1.76% of the population were Hispanic or Latino of any race. In 2000 Of the 48,941 households 36.30% had children under the age of 18 living with them, 61.10% were married couples living together, 10.80% had a female householder with no husband present, and 24.30% were non-families. 20.30% of households were one person and 7.20% were one person aged 65 or older. The average household size was 2.64 and the average family size was 3.04.

The age distribution was 26.30% under the age of 18, 8.00% from 18 to 24, 30.70% from 25 to 44, 24.30% from 45 to 64, and 10.70% 65 or older. The median age was 36 years. For every 100 females, there were 95.90 males. For every 100 females age 18 and over, there were 92.30 males.

The median household income was $46,030 and the median family income was $52,125. Males had a median income of $36,875 versus $25,720 for females. The per capita income for the county was $21,164. About 6.20% of families and 8.10% of the population were below the poverty line, including 10.50% of those under age 18 and 10.00% of those age 65 or over.

== Government and politics ==
=== Government ===
In 2023, the Sumner County Commission had a majority of pro-religious politicians. A member of a more moderate right wing faction, Baker Ring, stated of the largest faction in government: "They're opposed to government. But now they are the government."

=== Politics ===
Though part of historically Democratic Middle Tennessee, Sumner County was one of the first counties in the region to switch to the Republican Party. It has voted for the GOP solidly in every election back to 1984, with the sole exception being Bill Clinton's victory in the county in 1992.

United States presidential election results for Sumner County, Tennessee
Year	Republican		Democratic		Third party(ies)	
Year	No.	%	No.	%	No.	%
1880	1,092	27.40%	2,893	72.60%	0	0.00%
1884	945	29.61%	2,225	69.71%	22	0.69%
1888	1,228	30.40%	2,778	68.76%	34	0.84%
1892	677	18.75%	2,121	58.74%	813	22.51%
1896	1,215	27.33%	3,171	71.34%	59	1.33%
1900	776	22.64%	2,589	75.55%	62	1.81%
1904	599	21.08%	2,178	76.64%	65	2.29%
1908	673	22.11%	2,343	76.97%	28	0.92%
1912	769	22.64%	2,477	72.94%	150	4.42%
1916	612	19.28%	2,487	78.33%	76	2.39%
1920	1,268	25.55%	3,674	74.03%	21	0.42%
1924	435	13.93%	2,631	84.25%	57	1.83%
1928	1,045	29.12%	2,541	70.82%	2	0.06%
1932	382	8.88%	3,893	90.47%	28	0.65%
1936	517	14.10%	3,146	85.82%	3	0.08%
1940	834	18.75%	3,591	80.75%	22	0.49%
1944	990	19.50%	4,076	80.30%	10	0.20%
1948	793	15.84%	3,688	73.67%	525	10.49%
1952	2,233	28.10%	5,674	71.40%	40	0.50%
1956	2,123	22.28%	7,368	77.34%	36	0.38%
1960	3,491	34.02%	6,687	65.17%	83	0.81%
1964	3,437	27.41%	9,102	72.59%	0	0.00%
1968	4,519	27.41%	4,376	26.54%	7,592	46.05%
1972	10,020	66.11%	4,596	30.32%	541	3.57%
1976	7,946	36.11%	13,848	62.93%	213	0.97%
1980	11,876	44.42%	14,150	52.93%	709	2.65%
1984	18,442	61.09%	11,535	38.21%	209	0.69%
1988	19,523	62.20%	11,702	37.28%	164	0.52%
1992	17,401	41.30%	19,387	46.01%	5,344	12.68%
1996	20,863	48.35%	19,205	44.50%	3,086	7.15%
2000	27,601	54.68%	22,118	43.82%	758	1.50%
2004	40,181	64.84%	21,458	34.63%	329	0.53%
2008	44,949	66.73%	21,487	31.90%	926	1.37%
2012	46,003	70.28%	18,579	28.38%	875	1.34%
2016	50,129	70.11%	18,161	25.40%	3,215	4.50%
2020	63,454	68.50%	27,680	29.88%	1,496	1.62%
2024	68,767	70.34%	27,874	28.51%	1,120	1.15%

== Education ==
=== Public schools ===
Schools in the county are governed by the Sumner County Board of Education. The twelve-member group consists of eleven elected representatives from each of the eleven educational districts in the county, as well as the Director of Schools. The members serve staggered four-year terms; the Director serves under contract with the Board of Education. The board conducts monthly meetings that are open to the public.

=== Private schools ===
- Saint John Vianney Catholic Elementary School (K–8)
- Sumner Academy (K–8)
- John Paul II High School
- Aaron Academy (K–12)
- Hendersonville Christian Academy (PK–12)
- Restoring Hope Christian Academy (PK–12)

=== Colleges ===
- Volunteer State Community College
- Union University (Hendersonville Campus)
- Welch College

== Communities ==
=== Cities ===
- Gallatin (county seat)
- Goodlettsville (partly in Davidson County)
- Hendersonville
- Millersville (partly in Robertson County)
- Mitchellville
- Portland (partly in Robertson County)
- White House (partly in Robertson County)

=== Town ===
- Westmoreland

=== Census-designated places ===
- Bethpage
- Bransford
- Castalian Springs
- Cottontown
- Fairfield
- Graball
- New Deal
- Oak Grove
- Shackle Island
- Walnut Grove

=== Unincorporated communities ===
- Bon Air
- Brackentown
- Cairo
- Corinth

== Notable people ==
Submarine innovator Horace Lawson Hunley was born in Sumner County on June 20, 1823. On October 15, 1863, Hunley, along with seven other crewmen, drowned while making a test dive in Charleston Harbor near Fort Pinckney. Following his death, the submarine, unofficially known as the "Fish Boat," was renamed the H.L. Hunley in his honor. On the night of February 17, 1864, the Hunley sank the USS Housatonic, making it the first submarine to sink an enemy vessel.

Watergate prosecutor and criminal defense trial lawyer James F. Neal was born and raised in Oak Grove and graduated from Sumner High School in Portland in 1947.

R&B National Recording Artist Nacole Rice was born in Sumner County.

Newspaper editor Lafayette Washington Groves was born here.

Other people include Jonathan Browning, a gun smith.

== See also ==
- National Register of Historic Places listings in Sumner County, Tennessee
