= Brackentown, Tennessee =

Unincorporated community in Tennessee, US

Coordinates: 36°35′56″N 86°23′12″W

Brackentown is an unincorporated community in Sumner County, Tennessee, in the United States.

== History ==
A post office called Brackentown was established in 1877, and remained in operation until it was discontinued in 1908. Brackentown was likely named for a member of the local Bracken family who appear in mid-19th century census records.
