= Graball, Sumner County, Tennessee =

Graball, Tennessee
- Census-designated place
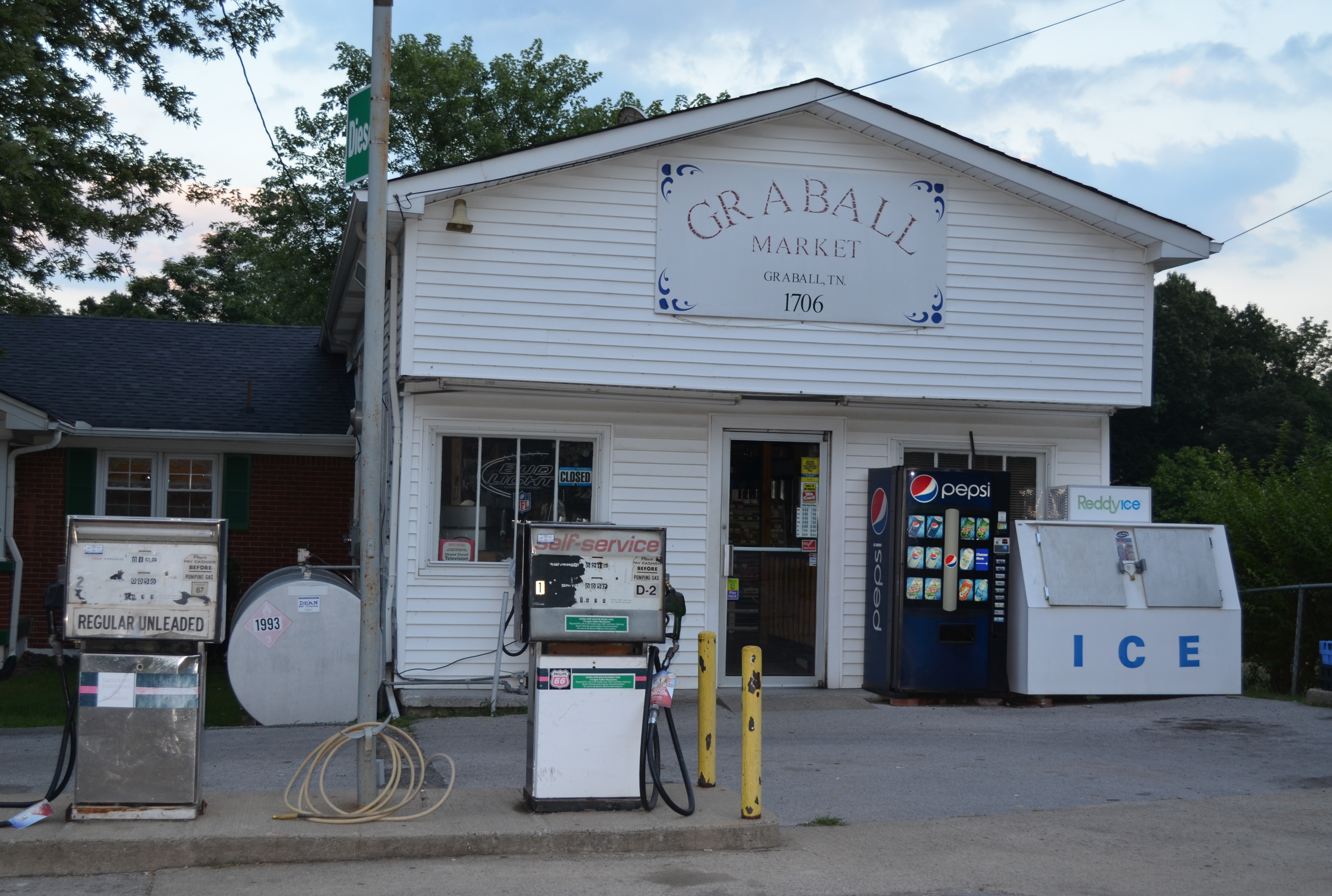
- Graball Market in Graball

- Location within Tennessee
- Coordinates: 36°28′57″N 86°26′17″W
- Country: United States
- State: Tennessee
- County: Sumner

Area
  - Total: 2.006 sq mi (5.20 km^{2})
  - Land: 2.006 sq mi (5.20 km^{2})
  - Water: 0 sq mi (0 km^{2})
- Elevation: 932 ft (284 m)

Population (2020)
  - Total: 228
  - Density: 114/sq mi (43.9/km^{2})
- Time zone: UTC-6 (Central (CST))
  - Summer (DST): UTC-5 (CDT)
- Area code: 615
- GNIS feature ID: 1285768

Graball is a census-designated place and unincorporated community in Sumner County, Tennessee, United States. As of the 2020 census, its population was 228, slightly down from 236 at the 2010 census.
