= Lafayette Washington Groves =

American newspaper edit (1834–1872)

Lafayette Washington Groves (April 11, 1834 – November 8, 1872) was an American newspaper editor, college professor, and lawyer. He was the associate editor of the Lexington Intelligencer. He was murdered by the editor of a competing newspaper in 1872.

== Biography ==
Groves, son of David Groves, was born in Sumner County, Tennessee on April 11, 1834. His father migrated to Lafayette County, Missouri in 1835, and the son spent three years in the Masonic College in Lexington, Missouri. He entered Yale College in his junior year, graduating in 1855. Returning home after graduation, he studied law in the office of Judge John Ryland, of Lexington, and was admitted to the bar in 1857. He began practicing law in St. Joseph, where he remained about eighteen months.

He then went to Mississippi and took charge of a High School in Cayuga, and was thus engaged at the beginning of the war. He then returned to Missouri, and entered the Southern army under the command of Gen. Sterling Price. After the close of the war, he spent some time at home. In 1868, he was elected professor of languages in Richmond College, at Richmond, Missouri., where he continued until 1870.

In the spring of 1871, he purchased the Lexington Intelligencer, and was its editor until his death He was assassinated, on the streets of Lexington, on November 8, 1872, by Edwin Turner, the publisher of a rival paper, the Lexington Register. Turner had been denounced by Groves for printing a slanderous personal attack upon him.
