= Walnut Grove, Sumner County, Tennessee =

Walnut Grove, Tennessee
- Census-designated place
- Location within the state of Tennessee
- Coordinates: 36°28′53″N 86°36′44″W
- Country: United States
- State: Tennessee
- County: Sumner

Area
  - Total: 4.82 sq mi (12.48 km^{2})
  - Land: 4.82 sq mi (12.48 km^{2})
  - Water: 0 sq mi (0.00 km^{2})
- Elevation: 890 ft (270 m)

Population (2020)
  - Total: 911
  - Density: 189.1/sq mi (73.02/km^{2})
- Time zone: UTC-6 (Central (CST))
  - Summer (DST): UTC-5 (CDT)
- FIPS code: 47-77820
- GNIS feature ID: 1273715

Walnut Grove is a census-designated place in Sumner County, Tennessee, United States. Its population was 864 as of the 2010 census. The community incorporated as a town in 1998. It disincorporated on July 1, 2001, after the law under which it had incorporated was ruled unconstitutional.

== Geography ==
Walnut Grove is located at 36°28′53″N 86°36′44″W (36.481393, -86.612095).

According to the United States Census Bureau, Walnut Grove had a total area of 4.8 square miles (12 km^{2}), all of it land.

== Demographics ==
Historical population
Census	Pop.	Note	%±
2020	911		—
U.S. Decennial Census

As of the census of 2000, there were 677 people, 241 households, and 200 families residing in the town. The population density was 202.2 inhabitants per square mile (78.1/km^{2}). There were 249 housing units at an average density of 74.4 per square mile (28.7/km^{2}). The racial makeup of the town was 96.16% White, 1.33% African American, 0.89% Native American, 0.44% Asian, and 1.18% from two or more races. Hispanic or Latino of any race were 0.59% of the population.

There were 241 households, out of which 33.6% had children under the age of 18 living with them, 75.1% were married couples living together, 6.2% had a female householder with no husband present, and 17.0% were non-families. 13.3% of all households were made up of individuals, and 6.2% had someone living alone who was 65 years of age or older. The average household size was 2.81 and the average family size was 3.09.

In the town the population was spread out, with 21.9% under the age of 18, 10.2% from 18 to 24, 30.3% from 25 to 44, 27.8% from 45 to 64, and 9.9% who were 65 years of age or older. The median age was 38 years. For every 100 females, there were 103.9 males. For every 100 females age 18 and over, there were 105.0 males.

The median income for a household in the town was $48,906, and the median income for a family was $57,321. Males had a median income of $37,339 versus $15,625 for females. The per capita income for the town was $15,680. About 9.2% of families and 9.8% of the population were below the poverty line, including 7.0% of those under age 18 and none of those age 65 or over.
