= Fairfield, Sumner County, Tennessee =

Fairfield, Tennessee
- Census-designated place
- Location within Tennessee
- Coordinates: 36°37′11″N 86°20′44″W
- Country: United States
- State: Tennessee
- County: Sumner
- First settled: 1808

Area
  - Total: 0.991 sq mi (2.57 km^{2})
  - Land: 0.991 sq mi (2.57 km^{2})
  - Water: 0 sq mi (0 km^{2})
- Elevation: 810 ft (250 m)

Population (2020)
  - Total: 141
  - Density: 142/sq mi (54.9/km^{2})
- Time zone: UTC-6 (Central (CST))
  - Summer (DST): UTC-5 (CDT)
- Area code: 615
- GNIS feature ID: 1315035

Fairfield is a census-designated place and unincorporated community in Sumner County, Tennessee, United States. As of the 2020 census, its population was 141, up from 131 at the 2010 census.

== History ==
In 1808, a man called John Sarver settled the area. The community in the area grew around the terrain he had settled over time.
