= Carinthia (disambiguation) =

Carinthia is a state of Austria.

Carinthia may also refer to:

- March of Carinthia, a frontier district of the Carolingian Empire created in 889
- Duchy of Carinthia, a state of the Holy Roman Empire and Austrian crown land
- Carinthia (Slovenia), a traditional region of Slovenia, part of the former duchy
- Carinthia Statistical Region, a statistical region in Slovenia
- RMS Carinthia (1925), a passenger ship
- RMS Carinthia (1955), a passenger ship

== See also ==
- Koroška (disambiguation)
- Carantania, a medieval Slavic principality
- Carniola
- Carnia
- Corinthia
