= Corinto =

Corinto may refer to:

- Corinto, Minas Gerais, Brazil
- Corinto, Cauca, Colombia
- Corinto, El Salvador
- Corinto, Nicaragua

== Other uses ==
- Corinto bianco, another name for the Spanish wine grape Pedro Ximénez
