= Bon Air, Sumner County, Tennessee =

Unincorporated community in Tennessee, US

Coordinates: 36°35′41″N 86°21′29″W

Bon Air is an unincorporated community in Sumner County, in the U.S. state of Tennessee.

== History ==
Bon Air probably refers to "good air".
