= Corinth Christian Methodist Episcopal Church =

Historic church in Kentucky, United States

- U.S. National Register of Historic Places
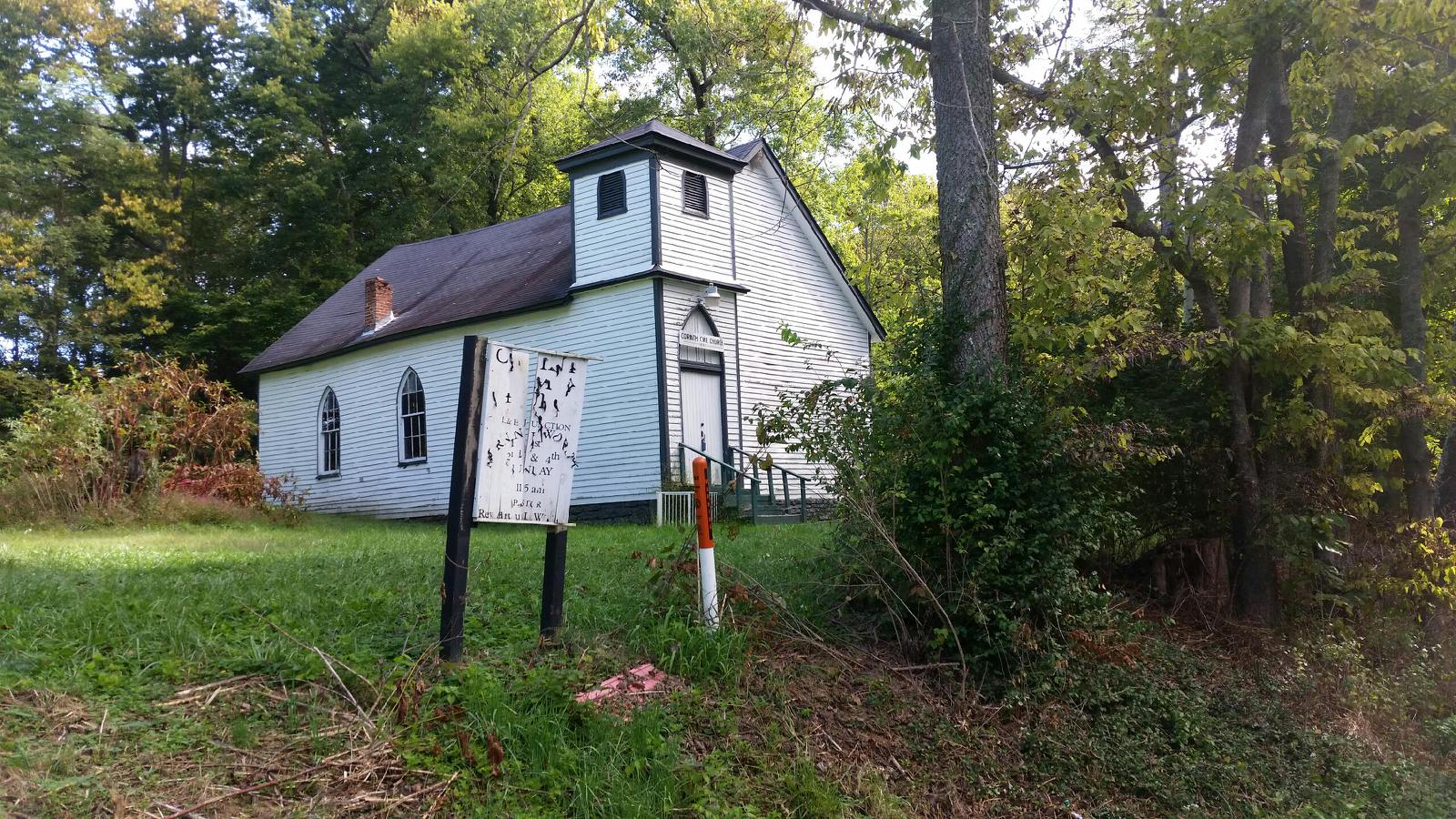

- Location within Kentucky Location within the United States
- Location: 1180 L & E Junction Rd., Winchester, Kentucky
- Coordinates: 37°59′54″N 84°3′30″W
- Area: less than one acre
- Architectural style: Gothic Revival
- NRHP reference No.: 07000678
- Added to NRHP: July 11, 2007

Corinth Christian Methodist Episcopal Church is a historic church at 1180 L & E Junction Road in Winchester, Kentucky. It served as a church for a black congregation for more than a century. It was added to the National Register in 2007.

== See also ==
- National Register of Historic Places listings in Kentucky
