= Rokeby (Leesburg, Virginia) =

Historic house in Virginia, United States

- U.S. National Register of Historic Places
- Virginia Landmarks Register
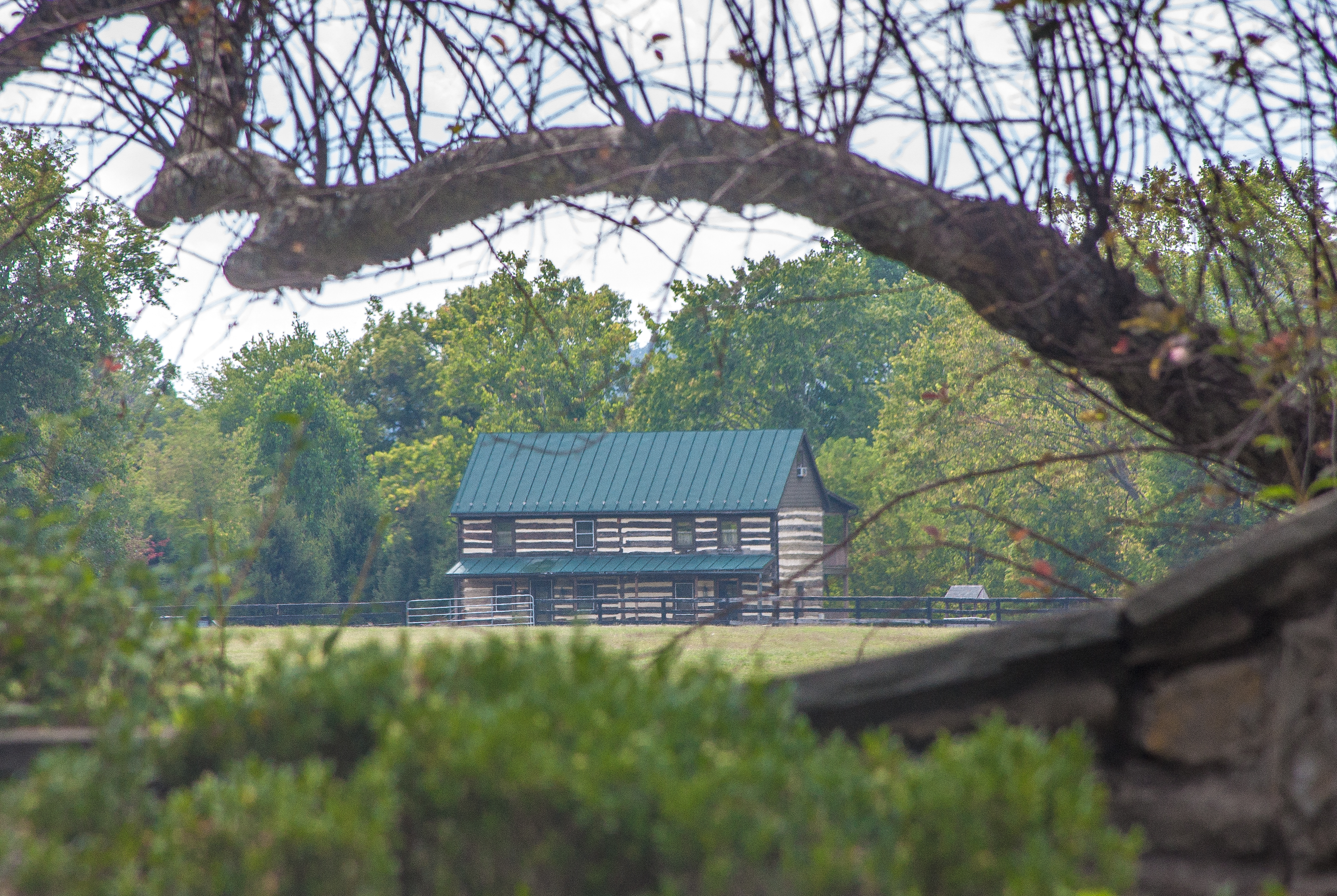
- Building on Rokeby Property, September 2012

- Location within Northern Virginia Location within Virginia Location within the United States
- Nearest city: Leesburg, Virginia
- Coordinates: 39°04′17.75″N 77°35′45.85″W
- Area: 60 acres (24 ha)
- Built: 1765
- Architectural style: Georgian
- NRHP reference No.: 76002109
- VLR No.: 053-0097

Significant dates
- Added to NRHP: May 30, 1976
- Designated VLR: May 20, 1975

Rokeby is a Georgian house near Leesburg, Virginia, built in the mid-18th century. The house is the best example of Georgian architecture in Loudoun County. Rokeby served as a depository for U.S. Government documents during the British occupation and burning of Washington in 1814 during the War of 1812. The Declaration of Independence was reputedly kept in the basement.

== Description ==
The main house is a two-story five-bay brick building standing on a low basement, with prominent end chimneys. The plan is two rooms deep with a central stair hall. A rear wing was added in 1886, using detailing that matched the original house. The main house is notable for its basement, in which the central portion features a brick barrel vault. A large kitchen was located in the basement; its hearth survives. Renovations have altered much of the interior detailing, adding Colonial Revival trim and plaster detailing. The exterior is built entirely in Flemish bond.

== History ==
Rokeby was built around 1765 by Charles Binns, Sr., the first clerk of the circuit court of Loudoun County on a 160-acre (65 ha) tract. His son inherited the house in 1801. Although William Binns did not live there when British forces threatened the new national capital in 1814, the empty house was used to store U.S. government documents at the direction of then-Secretary of State James Monroe. In 1830, Benjamin Shreve, Jr. purchased the house and remodeled, altering the earlier clipped gables to their present form and who changed the interior trim details.

Circa 1886, under the ownership of O.E. Breese, the house was first called "Rokeby." The Breese family made the additions to the rear of the house. It was restored in 1958.

Rokeby was placed on the National Register of Historic Places on May 30, 1976.
