= Corinth, Saluda County, South Carolina =

Corinth, South Carolina
- Ghost town
- Location within South Carolina
- Coordinates: 34°05′52″N 81°37′21″W
- Country: United States
- State: South Carolina
- County: Saluda
- Elevation: 423 ft (129 m)
- GNIS feature ID: 1232554

Corinth is a ghost town in Saluda County, South Carolina, United States. Corinth was located on what is now South Carolina Highway 194, 10.8 miles (17.4 km) northeast of Saluda. Corinth appeared on Soil Conservation Service maps as late as 1909.
