= Koroška =

Koroška is a Slovene name meaning 'Carinthia' that may refer to:

- Carinthia (state), the southernmost Austrian state
- Slovenian Carinthia, a traditional region of Slovenia
- Duchy of Carinthia, a duchy that existed from 976 until 1918 in the territory of today's Slovenia and Austria
- Carinthia Statistical Region, a statistical region of Slovenia
