= Corinth, Ohio =

- Unincorporated community
- Location within Ohio
- Coordinates: 41°23′55″N 80°37′22″W
- Country: United States
- State: Ohio
- County: Trumbull
- Elevation: 991 ft (302 m)
- Time zone: UTC-5 (Eastern (EST))
  - Summer (DST): UTC-4 (EDT)
- Area code: 330
- GNIS feature ID: 1062712

Corinth is an unincorporated community in Trumbull County, Ohio, United States. Corinth is located on Ohio State Route 5, 7.1 miles (11.4 km) northeast of the city of Cortland.
