= Corinth, Sumter County, Georgia =

Corinth, Georgia
- Ghost town
- Location within Georgia
- Coordinates: 32°03′03″N 84°01′19″W
- Country: United States
- State: Georgia
- County: Sumter
- Elevation: 315 ft (96 m)
- GNIS feature ID: 343430

Corinth is an abandoned ghost town in Sumter County, Georgia, United States. Corinth was 12.5 miles (20.1 km) east of Americus.
