= Corinth, Southampton County, Virginia =

- Unincorporated community
- Location within Virginia Location within the United States
- Coordinates: 36°49′53″N 76°56′44″W
- Country: United States
- State: Virginia
- County: Southampton
- Elevation: 85 ft (26 m)
- Time zone: UTC-5 (Eastern (EST))
  - Summer (DST): UTC-4 (EDT)
- Area codes: 757, 948
- GNIS feature ID: 1477225

Corinth is an unincorporated community in Southampton County, Virginia, United States. Corinth is 10.45 miles (16.82 km) northeast of Courtland.
