= Corinth, Walker County, Georgia =

Corinth, Georgia
- Unincorporated community
- Location within Georgia
- Coordinates: 34°40′03″N 85°14′52″W
- Country: United States
- State: Georgia
- County: Walker
- Elevation: 909 ft (277 m)
- Time zone: UTC-5 (Eastern (EST))
  - Summer (DST): UTC-4 (EDT)
- Area code: 706
- GNIS feature ID: 354009

Corinth is an unincorporated community in Walker County, Georgia, United States, located 3.2 miles (5.1 km) southeast of LaFayette.
