= Corinth, Carroll County, Virginia =

Corinth, Virginia
- Unincorporated community
- Location within Virginia Location within the United States
- Coordinates: 36°47′19″N 80°52′46″W
- Country: United States
- State: Virginia
- County: Carroll
- Elevation: 2,671 ft (814 m)
- Time zone: UTC-5 (Eastern (EST))
  - Summer (DST): UTC-4 (EDT)
- Area code: 276
- GNIS feature ID: 1482710

Corinth is an unincorporated community in Carroll County, Virginia, United States. Corinth is 8.25 miles (13.28 km) west-northwest of Hillsville.
