= Corinth, Knox County, Tennessee =

Corinth, Tennessee
- Unincorporated community
- Location within Tennessee Location within the United States
- Coordinates: 36°03′54″N 83°53′05″W
- Country: United States
- State: Tennessee
- County: Knox

Government
  - Type: County commission
  - Mayor: Glenn Jacobs (R)
  - Commissioners: Courtney Durrett (D) (District 2); Rhonda Lee (R) (District 7); Adam Thompson (R) (District 8); Kim Frazier (R) (At-Large); Larsen Jay (R) (At-Large)
- Elevation: 1,129 ft (344 m)
- Time zone: UTC-5 (Eastern (EST))
  - Summer (DST): UTC-4 (EDT)
- Area code: 865
- GNIS feature ID: 1281300

Corinth is an unincorporated community in Knox County, Tennessee, United States. Corinth is located on Tennessee State Route 331 7.5 miles (12.1 km) north-northeast of downtown Knoxville.
