= Corinth, Logan County, Kentucky =

Unincorporated community in Kentucky, United States

Corinth, Kentucky
- Unincorporated community
- Location within Kentucky Location within the United States
- Coordinates: 36°47′20″N 86°48′14″W
- Country: United States
- State: Kentucky
- County: Logan
- Elevation: 640 ft (200 m)
- Time zone: UTC-6 (Central (CST))
  - Summer (DST): UTC-5 (CDT)
- Area code: 270
- GNIS feature ID: 507760

Corinth is an unincorporated community in Logan County, Kentucky, United States. Corinth is located on Kentucky Route 100 6 miles (9.7 km) southeast of Russellville.
