= Corinth, Sumner County, Tennessee =

Corinth, Tennessee
- Unincorporated community
- Location within Tennessee Location within the United States
- Coordinates: 36°34′40″N 86°25′32″W
- Country: United States
- State: Tennessee
- County: Sumner
- Elevation: 768 ft (234 m)
- Time zone: UTC-6 (Central (CST))
  - Summer (DST): UTC-5 (CDT)
- Area code: 615
- GNIS feature ID: 1281301

Corinth is an unincorporated community in Sumner County, Tennessee, United States. Corinth is located near Tennessee State Route 52 approximately 5 miles (8.0 km) east of Portland.
