= National Register of Historic Places listings in Robertson County, Tennessee =

Location of Robertson County in Tennessee

Robertson County, Tennessee, United States, has 29 properties and districts listed on the National Register of Historic Places.

Latitude and longitude coordinates are provided for many National Register properties and districts; these locations may be seen together in a map.

Contents: Counties in Tennessee
Anderson – Bedford – Benton – Bledsoe – Blount – Bradley – Campbell – Cannon – Carroll – Carter – Cheatham – Chester – Claiborne – Clay – Cocke – Coffee – Crockett – Cumberland – Davidson – Decatur – DeKalb – Dickson – Dyer – Fayette – Fentress – Franklin – Gibson – Giles – Grainger – Greene – Grundy – Hamblen – Hamilton – Hancock – Hardeman – Hardin – Hawkins – Haywood – Henderson – Henry – Hickman – Houston – Humphreys – Jackson – Jefferson – Johnson – Knox – Lake – Lauderdale – Lawrence – Lewis – Lincoln – Loudon – Macon – Madison – Marion – Marshall – Maury – McMinn – McNairy – Meigs – Monroe – Montgomery – Moore – Morgan – Obion – Overton – Perry – Pickett – Polk – Putnam – Rhea – Roane – Robertson – Rutherford – Scott – Sequatchie – Sevier – Shelby – Smith – Stewart – Sullivan – Sumner – Tipton – Trousdale – Unicoi – Union – Van Buren – Warren – Washington – Wayne – Weakley – White – Williamson – Wilson

This National Park Service list is complete through NPS recent listings posted September 25, 2026.

== Current listings ==
	Name on the Register	Image	Date listed	Location	City or town	Description
1	The Beeches	The Beeches	March 25, 1982 (#82004037)	State Route 49; 36°31′15″N 86°51′18″W	Springfield vicinity	
2	Bell Witch Cave	Bell Witch Cave	March 21, 2008 (#08000237)	430 Keysburg Rd. 36°35′29″N 87°03′20″W	Adams vicinity	Associated with the legend of the Bell Witch
3	Cornsilk	Cornsilk	January 11, 1974 (#74002266)	6128 Stringer Rd; 36°38′06″N 86°37′54″W	Cross Plains vicinity	
4	Frierson Chapel	Frierson Chapel	November 27, 2019 (#100004694)	Approx. 0.20 mi. off Old Coopertown Rd. 36°26′11″N 86°57′44″W	Coopertown	
5	Glen Raven	Glen Raven	October 2, 1973 (#73001816)	4410 Glen Raven Rd; 36°31′53″N 87°04′11″W	Cedar Hill vicinity	
6	Mollie and Neel Glenn House	Mollie and Neel Glenn House	July 25, 2012 (#12000440)	307 5th Ave. 36°30′36″N 86°53′17″W	Springfield	
7	Highland Chapel Union Church	Highland Chapel Union Church	October 29, 1991 (#91001592)	2392 Highland Ave; 36°23′42″N 86°46′30″W	Ridgetop	
8	Mansfield Cheatham House	Mansfield Cheatham House	January 30, 1978 (#78002626)	306 W 7th Ave; 36°30′28″N 86°53′19″W	Springfield	
9	William M. McMurry House	William M. McMurry House	April 17, 2017 (#100000904)	313 N. Main St. 36°30′44″N 86°53′04″W	Springfield	
10	Nelson's Green Brier Distillery	Nelson's Green Brier Distillery	July 24, 2008 (#08000703)	Main St. west of Greenbrier Cemetery Rd. 36°26′05″N 86°47′27″W	Greenbrier	
11	George O'Bryan House	George O'Bryan House	February 23, 1989 (#89000073)	117 O'Bryan Ave; 36°23′43″N 86°46′23″W	Ridgetop	
12	Arthur Pitt House and Distillery	Arthur Pitt House and Distillery	December 18, 1973 (#73001820)	4333 Louis Draughon Rd. 36°32′36″N 86°48′50″W	Springfield vicinity	
13	William Randolph House	William Randolph House	October 30, 1973 (#73001818)	7667 TN-25; 36°32′54″N 86°41′52″W	Cross Plains	
14	Red River Blockhouse Number 1		November 15, 2003 (#03001157)	5461 U.S. Route 41; 36°35′22″N 87°04′58″W	Adams	
15	Robertson County Courthouse	Robertson County Courthouse	May 22, 1978 (#78002627)	Public Sq. 36°30′33″N 86°53′07″W	Springfield	
16	Rock Jolly	Rock Jolly	October 30, 1973 (#73001819)	5128 Rock House Rd. 36°34′44″N 86°37′23″W	Cross Plains vicinity	
17	Russell House	Russell House	November 22, 2011 (#11000458)	2520 Memorial Boulevard; 36°29′22″N 86°51′53″W	Springfield	
18	St. Michael's Catholic Church	St. Michael's Catholic Church	July 5, 1973 (#73001817)	3553 S Carter Rd; 36°29′14″N 86°59′56″W	Cedar Hill vicinity	
19	Springfield Town Square Historic District	Springfield Town Square Historic District	August 1, 1979 (#79002456)	U.S. Route 41 and State Route 49; 36°30′34″N 86°53′08″W	Springfield	
20	Sulphur Fork Bridge	Sulphur Fork Bridge	July 20, 2020 (#100005366)	3300 Old Clarksville Hwy. over the Sulphur Fork of the Red River (Port Royal State Park); 36°33′15″N 87°08′25″W	Adams vicinity	Extends into Montgomery County
21	Granville Babb Sprouse House	Granville Babb Sprouse House	October 30, 1998 (#98001307)	205 W. College St. 36°25′37″N 86°48′25″W	Greenbrier	
22	Strickland Place Farm	Strickland Place Farm	March 31, 2010 (#10000142)	7724-7726 Highway 76 East; 36°28′35″N 86°42′27″W	White House vicinity	
23	Sudley Place	Sudley Place	January 11, 1974 (#74001925)	6236 State Line Rd; 36°38′40″N 86°48′56″W	Youngville vicinity	
24	Thomas Drugs	Thomas Drugs	November 4, 1993 (#93001189)	7802 State Route 25, E. 36°32′55″N 86°41′48″W	Cross Plains	
25	Dr. Martin Walton House	Dr. Martin Walton House	November 20, 1996 (#96001318)	6353 State Route 25, E. 36°33′14″N 86°47′09″W	Springfield vicinity	
26	Walton–Wiggins Farm	Walton–Wiggins Farm	August 8, 1997 (#97000883)	4020 Woodrow Wilson Rd. 36°31′12″N 86°44′05″W	Springfield vicinity	
27	Wessyngton	Wessyngton	May 6, 1971 (#71000830)	3021 Wessington Rd; 36°30′05″N 87°00′14″W	Cedar Hill vicinity	
28	Woodard Hall	Woodard Hall	October 10, 1975 (#75001775)	9200 Owens Chapel Rd; also 5876 Owens Chapel Rd. 36°32′04″N 86°49′18″W	Springfield vicinity	5876 Owens Chapel represents a boundary increase of April 28, 1995
29	Thomas Woodard, Jr. Farm	Thomas Woodard, Jr. Farm	April 8, 2008 (#08000315)	5024 Ogg Rd. 36°34′15″N 86°56′13″W	Cedar Hill vicinity	

== See also ==
- List of National Historic Landmarks in Tennessee
- National Register of Historic Places listings in Tennessee
