= Glenn House =

Glenn House may refer to:

== Locations ==
- Glenn House (Batesville, Arkansas), a National Register of Historic Places listing in Independence County, Arkansas
- Glenn House (Cape Girardeau, Missouri)
- Hugh Glenn House, The Dalles, Oregon
- Dr. John Glenn House, Jenkinsville, South Carolina, a National Register of Historic Places listing in Fairfield County, South Carolina
- Mollie and Neel Glenn House, Springfield, Tennessee, a National Register of Historic Places listing in Robertson County, Tennessee
- Abram Glenn House, Triune, Tennessee, a National Register of Historic Places listing in Williamson County, Tennessee

== People ==
- TJ House, full name Glenn Anthony House (born 1989), American baseball player

== See also ==
- Glenn-Thompson Plantation, Pittsview, Alabama, a National Register of Historic Places listing in Russell County, Alabama
- Glenn Cottage Tract, Maud, Kentucky, a National Register of Historic Places listing in Washington County, Kentucky
