= Walton House =

Walton House may refer to:

== Canada ==
- Murray-Walton House and Farm, Haldimand, Ontario, a registered historic place in Southwestern Ontario

== United Kingdom ==
- Walton House, also known as Mill House and The Wharf, Sutton Courtenay, Oxford, a Grade II listed house
- Walton House, the earliest building of Somerville College, Oxford
- Walton House and Attached Walls, Stone, Stafford, a Grade II* listed building in the Borough of Stafford

== United States ==
(by state, then city/town)

- Dr. James Wyatt Walton House, Benton, Arkansas, listed on the National Register of Historic Places (NRHP)
- Dr. Robert and Mary Walton House, Modesto, California, listed on the NRHP in Stanislaus County, California
- George Walton House, Augusta, Georgia, a National Historic Landmark
- James A. Walton House, Columbus, Georgia, formerly listed on the NRHP in Muscogee County, Georgia
- John J. Walton House, Belleview, Kentucky, listed on the NRHP in Boone County, Kentucky
- Walton-Howry House, Sardis, Mississippi, listed on the NRHP in Panola County, Mississippi
- Asa Walton House, East Fallowfield Township, Pennsylvania, NRHP-listed
- Walton House (Pittsburgh), Pittsburgh, Pennsylvania
- Dr. Martin Walton House, Springfield, Tennessee, listed on the NRHP in Robertson County, Tennessee
- Walton-Wiggins Farm, Springfield, Tennessee, listed on the NRHP in Robertson County, Tennessee
- Franklin and Amelia Walton House, Centerville, Utah, NRHP-listed
- Wesley and Frances Walton House, Murray, Utah, listed on the NRHP in Salt Lake County, Utah

== In fiction ==
- The family house in The Waltons television series

== See also ==
- Walton Hall (disambiguation)
