= St. Michael's Catholic Church (Cedar Hill, Tennessee) =

Historic church in Tennessee, United States

- U.S. National Register of Historic Places
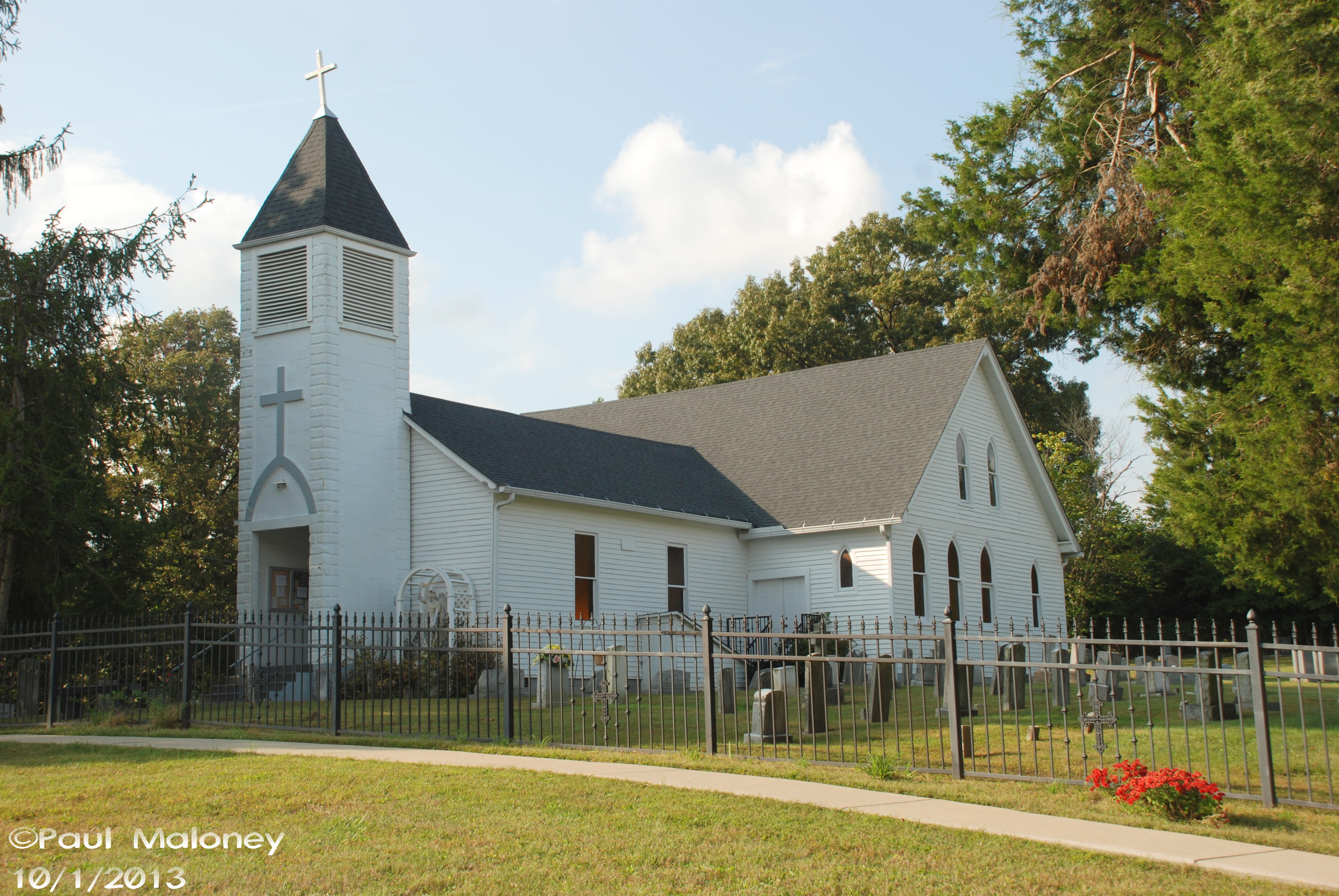

- Location within Tennessee Location within the United States
- Location: 3553 S.Carter Rd, Cedar Hill, Tennessee 37032
- Coordinates: 36°29′14″N 86°59′56″W
- Area: 9 acres (3.6 ha)
- Built: 1842
- NRHP reference No.: 73001817
- Added to NRHP: July 5, 1973

St. Michael's Catholic Church is a historic Roman Catholic church near Cedar Hill, Tennessee, United States. St. Michael's is the oldest Catholic church in continuous operation in Tennessee. Its building incorporates a log cabin structure built in 1842 that is the oldest Catholic church building in the state. It is listed on the National Register of Historic Places.

== History ==
The founding congregants of the church were four families who settled near Turnersville between 1838 and 1840. They bought an acre (0.40 ha) of land from the nearby Wessyngton plantation to build a church. The original log meetinghouse, which measured 22 feet (6.7 m) by 32 feet (9.8 m), was completed in 1842 and dedicated on the Feast of the Apparition of St. Michael, May 8, 1842. When the church was built, its location was a stagecoach stop on the route between Nashville and Clarksville.

From 1846 to 1855, the church operated a boarding school, Saint Michael's Male and Female Academy, located near the church. In 1864–5, the priest who served the church was Father Abram Ryan, who has been called "the poet-priest of the Confederacy".

In 1934–5, the log structure was sheathed with clapboard siding obtained from the dismantlement of an Episcopal church at Glen Raven and the building received a major addition, giving it a T-shaped plan. A bell tower was added to the front of the building in 1942, the church's centennial year. The bell that hangs in the tower came from the same church that provided the siding.

St. Michael's was the only Roman Catholic parish in Robertson County until 1944, when Our Lady of Lourdes church was formed in Springfield. St. Michael's now operates as a mission church of Our Lady of Lourdes. The church building was listed on the National Register of Historic Places on August 10, 1973.
