= George Augustine Washington =

American politician

Member of the Tennessee House of Representatives
- In office 1873–1875

Personal details
- Born: May 24, 1815 Robertson County, Tennessee
- Died: December 4, 1892 (aged 77) Cedar Hill, Tennessee
- Party: Democratic
- Spouse: 2
- Children: Joseph E. Washington
- Occupation: Planter, company director, politician

Colonel George Augustine Washington (May 24, 1815 – December 4, 1892) was an American tobacco planter, slaveholder, company director and politician. He was "one of the world's largest tobacco growers" by 1860, and served in the Tennessee General Assembly in the 1870s.

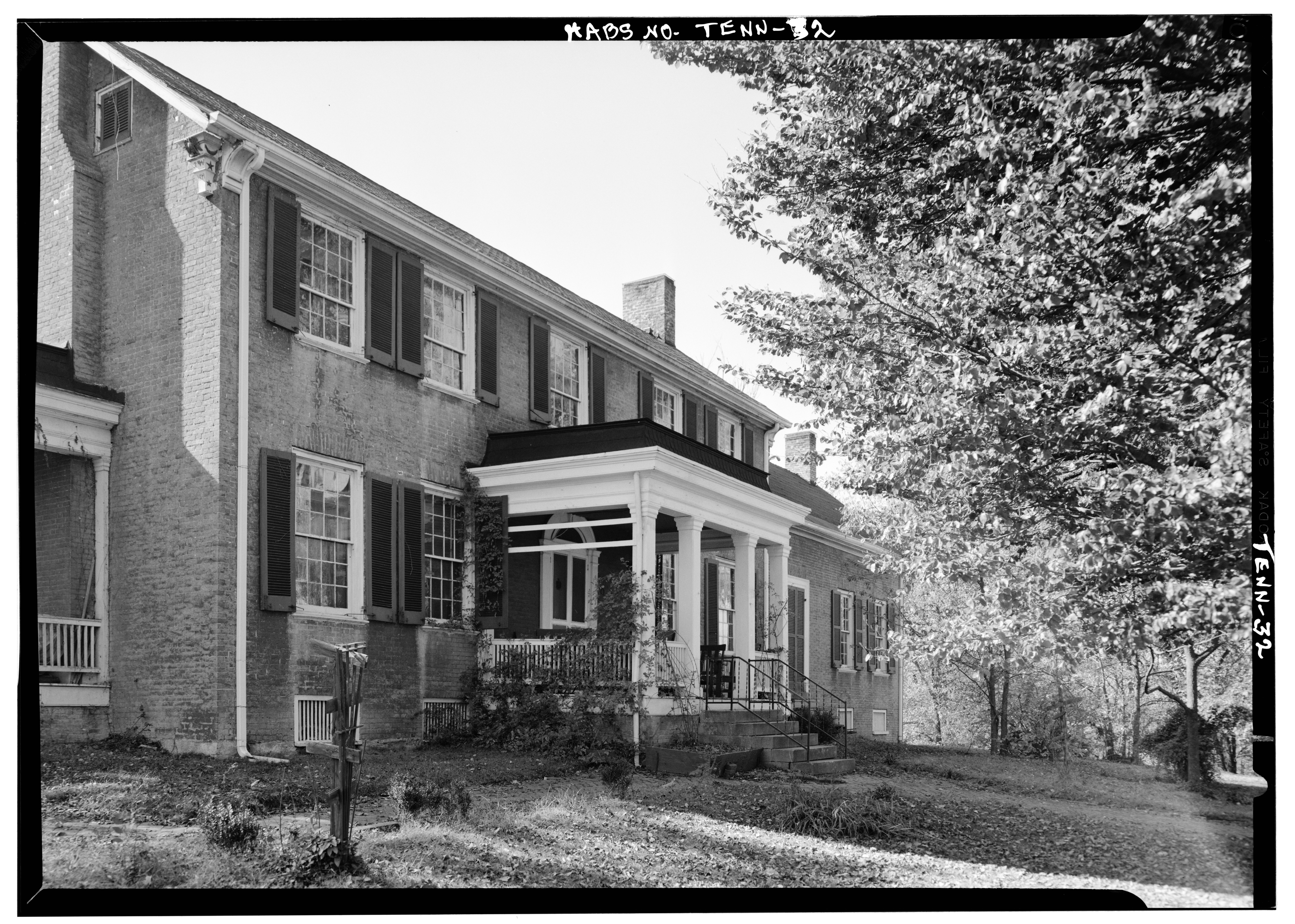
The Wessyngton Plantation house.

== Early life ==
George Augustine Washington was born on May 24, 1815, in Robertson County, Tennessee. His father, Joseph Washington, was from Virginia. His mother was Mary Cheatham. Washington built Wessyngton, a tobacco plantation in Cedar Hill, Tennessee.

== Career ==
Washington inherited the Wessyngton plantation in 1848, with slaves. In addition to producing tobacco as a commodity crop, the plantation also raised pigs and sold ham and related pork products. By 1860, Washington was "one of the world's largest tobacco growers," and the owner of 274 slaves. During the American Civil War of 1861–1865, he lived in New York City.

Washington served on the boards of directors of the Louisville and Nashville Railroad and the Nashville and Chattanooga Railroad. He also served as a Democratic Party member of the Tennessee House of Representatives representing Robertson County from 1873 to 1875.

== Death ==
Washington was married twice. He died on December 4, 1892, in Cedar Hill, Tennessee, and was interred in the family graveyard. His son Joseph E. Washington continued to manage the plantation, and served as a United States Congressman from Tennessee from 1887 to 1897.
