= Sudley =

Sudley may refer to a location or building:

== Places ==
=== United States ===
- Sudley (Deale, Maryland), a historic home listed on the NRHP in Anne Arundel County, Maryland
- Sudley, Maryland, an unincorporated community
- Sudley Place, a historic mansion in Tennessee
- Sudley Springs, Virginia, an unincorporated community
- Sudley, Virginia, a census-designated place

=== United Kingdom ===
- Sudeley Castle, a castle in Gloucestershire, England
- Sudley House, a historic house in Liverpool, England

== Other ==
- Sudley (DJ), musician best known for "Fumble"
