= Glen Raven =

Glen Raven may refer to:

- Glen Raven, North Carolina, a town in Alamance County, North Carolina, US
- Glen Raven, Inc., a fabric manufacturer headquartered in Glen Raven, North Carolina, US
- Glen Raven (Cedar Hill, Tennessee), a mansion on the US National Register of Historic Places
