= Thomas Woodard, Jr. Farm =

Historic house in Tennessee, United States

- Woodard, Thomas Jr., Farm
- U.S. National Register of Historic Places
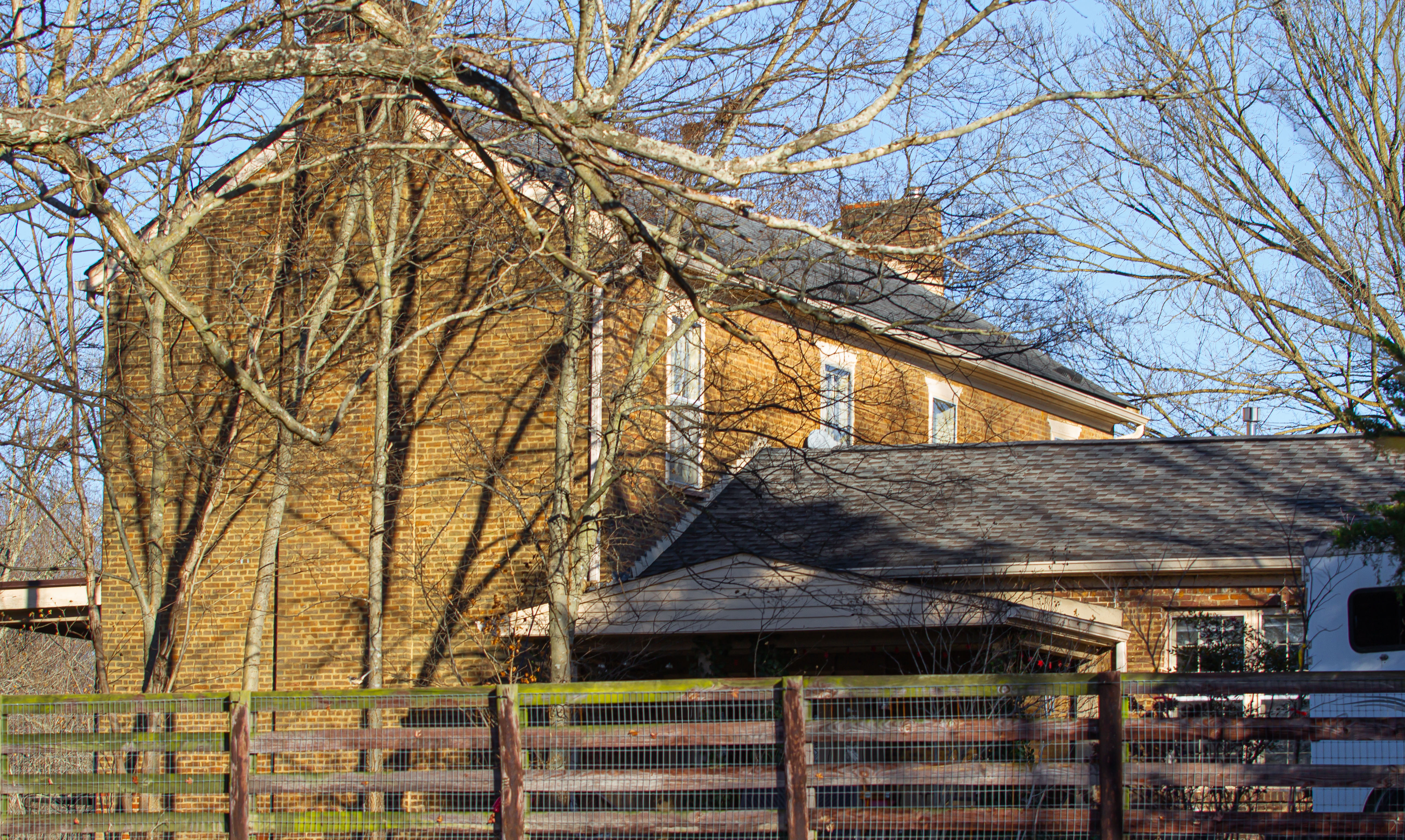
- Thomas Woodard Jr. Farm

- Location within Tennessee Location within the United States
- Nearest city: Cedar Hill, Tennessee
- Coordinates: 36.56915°N 86.93766°W
- Area: 132.3 acres (53.5 ha)
- Built: 1838
- Architectural style: Federal
- MPS: Historic Family Farms in Middle Tennessee MPS
- NRHP reference No.: 08000315
- Added to NRHP: April 8, 2008

The Thomas Woodard, Jr. Farm is a historic farmhouse near Cedar Hill, Tennessee, U.S.

== History ==
The farmhouse was built circa 1838 for Thomas Woodard, Jr. of Woodard Hall, his wife Winnefred House Robertson, and their children. Woodard owned distilled whiskey and grew tobacco.

Woodard owned slaves who worked on the farm. By 1860, he owned 14. After the American Civil War of 1861–1865, most of his former slaves, who took the last name Woodard, became tenant farmers. Both slaves and tenant farmers were buried in a cemetery on the property.

The farm remained in the Woodard family until 1921, when it continued to be used to grow tobacco. It is now a horse farm.

== Architectural significance ==
The house was designed in the Federal architectural style. It has been listed on the National Register of Historic Places since April 8, 2008.
