= Wessyngton =

Wessyngton may refer to:

- Washington, Tyne and Wear, in England, which might have been termed "Wessyngton" sometime
- Wessyngton (Cedar Hill, Tennessee), a historic mansion listed on the U.S. National Register of Historic Places

== See also ==
- Wessington, Derbyshire, England, a village and civil parish
- Wessington, South Dakota, a town
