= Long Night =

Long Night or The Long Night may refer to:

== Film and television ==
- The Long Night (1947 film), a film noir
- The Long Night (2022 film), an American horror film
- "Long Night", an episode of Please Teacher!
- "The Long Night" (Babylon 5), a 1997 television episode
- "The Long Night" (Camelot), a 2011 television episode
- "The Long Night" (Game of Thrones), a 2019 television episode
- "The Long Night" (Outnumbered) a 2008 television episode

== Literature ==
- A Long Night (1986), a novel by Ellen Douglas
- The Long Night (1983), a short story collection by Poul Anderson
- The Long Night (1939), a novel by Herbert Bruncken
- The Long Night (1956), a novel by Martin Caidin
- The Long Night (1997), a novel by Jason Carl, based on Vampire: The Dark Ages
- The Long Night (1959), a novel by Ovid Demaris
- The Long Night (1957), a novel by Hartley Howard
- The Long Night (1936), a novel by Andrew Nelson Lytle
- The Long Night (1958), a novel by Julian Mayfield
- The Long Night (1957), a story by William Mayne in the 1957 collection 5 More
- The Long Night (1996), a novel by Dean Wesley Smith and Kristine Kathryn Rusch, based on Star Trek: Deep Space Nine
- The Long Night (1952), a novel by Bryce Walton
- The Long Night (1903), a novel by Stanley J. Weyman
- Titanic: The Long Night (1998), a novel by Diane Hoh

== Music ==
- Long Night (album), a 1961 album by Frank Strozier
- "Long Night" (Kim Hyung-jun song), 2011
- "Long Night" (The Corrs song), 2004
- "Long Night", a song by Eddy Grant, from the album Reparation
