= Joseph E. Washington =

American politician (1851–1915)

Joseph Edwin Washington
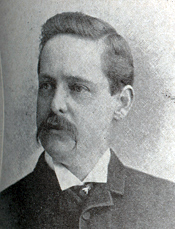

Member of the U.S. House of Representatives from Tennessee's 6th district
- In office March 4, 1887 – March 3, 1897
- Preceded by: Andrew J. Caldwell
- Succeeded by: John W. Gaines

Member of the Tennessee House of Representatives
- In office 1877–1879

Personal details
- Born: November 10, 1851 Robertson County, Tennessee, US
- Died: August 28, 1915 (aged 63) Robertson County, Tennessee, US
- Citizenship: United States
- Party: Democratic
- Spouse: Mary Bolling Kemp Washington
- Children: George Augustine Washington; Anne Bolling Washington Blagden; Joseph Edwin Washington; Elizabeth Wyndham Washington
- Education: Georgetown College; Vanderbilt University, Nashville, Tennessee
- Profession: Attorney, politician, planter, railroad director

Joseph Edwin Washington (November 10, 1851 – August 28, 1915) was an American politician and a member of the United States House of Representatives for the 6th congressional district of Tennessee.

== Early life ==
Washington was born on November 10, 1851, on his family tobacco plantation, Wessyngton, near Cedar Hill, Tennessee in Robertson County. His father, George Augustine Washington, was a planter and major slaveholder, a director of the Louisville and Nashville Railroad and the Nashville and Chattanooga Railroad, and a member of the Tennessee General Assembly from 1873 to 1875.

Washington received his early instruction at home and graduated from Georgetown College in Washington, D.C., on June 26, 1873. He studied law with the first law class organized at Vanderbilt University in Nashville, Tennessee in 1874. He was admitted to the bar, but never practiced. He took over management of Wessyngton Plantation and entered politics.

== Career ==
From 1877 to 1879 Washington was a member of the Tennessee House of Representatives. In 1886 he was elected as a Democrat to the Fiftieth United States Congress, and was re-elected to the four succeeding Congresses. He served from March 4, 1887, to March 3, 1897, but he was not a candidate for renomination in 1896. He was the chairman of the United States House Committee on Territories during the Fifty-second Congress.

Appointed road commissioner, Washington had charge of the road construction work of Robertson County. He was a member of the Board of Trustees of Vanderbilt University and a director of the Nashville, Chattanooga & St. Louis and Nashville & Decatur Railroads. He resumed agricultural pursuits, managing the family's tobacco plantation, Wessyngton, in Robertson County, Tennessee.

== Personal life and death ==
Washington married Mary Bolling Kemp and they had four children, George, Anne, Joseph, and Elizabeth.

Washington died on August 28, 1915, (aged 63) on the family estate. He is interred at the family burying ground on his estate.

U.S. House of Representatives
Preceded by Andrew J. Caldwell	Member of the U.S. House of Representatives from Tennessee's 6th congressional district 1887–1897	Succeeded by John W. Gaines
