= Andrew Lytle =

Andrew Lytle may refer to:

- Andrew Nelson Lytle (1902–1995), American novelist, dramatist, essayist and professor of literature
- Andrew Lytle (pioneer), captain of the pioneer company that founded San Bernardino, California, and its third mayor
