= Cornsilk (Cross Plains, Tennessee) =

Historic house in Tennessee, United States

- U.S. National Register of Historic Places
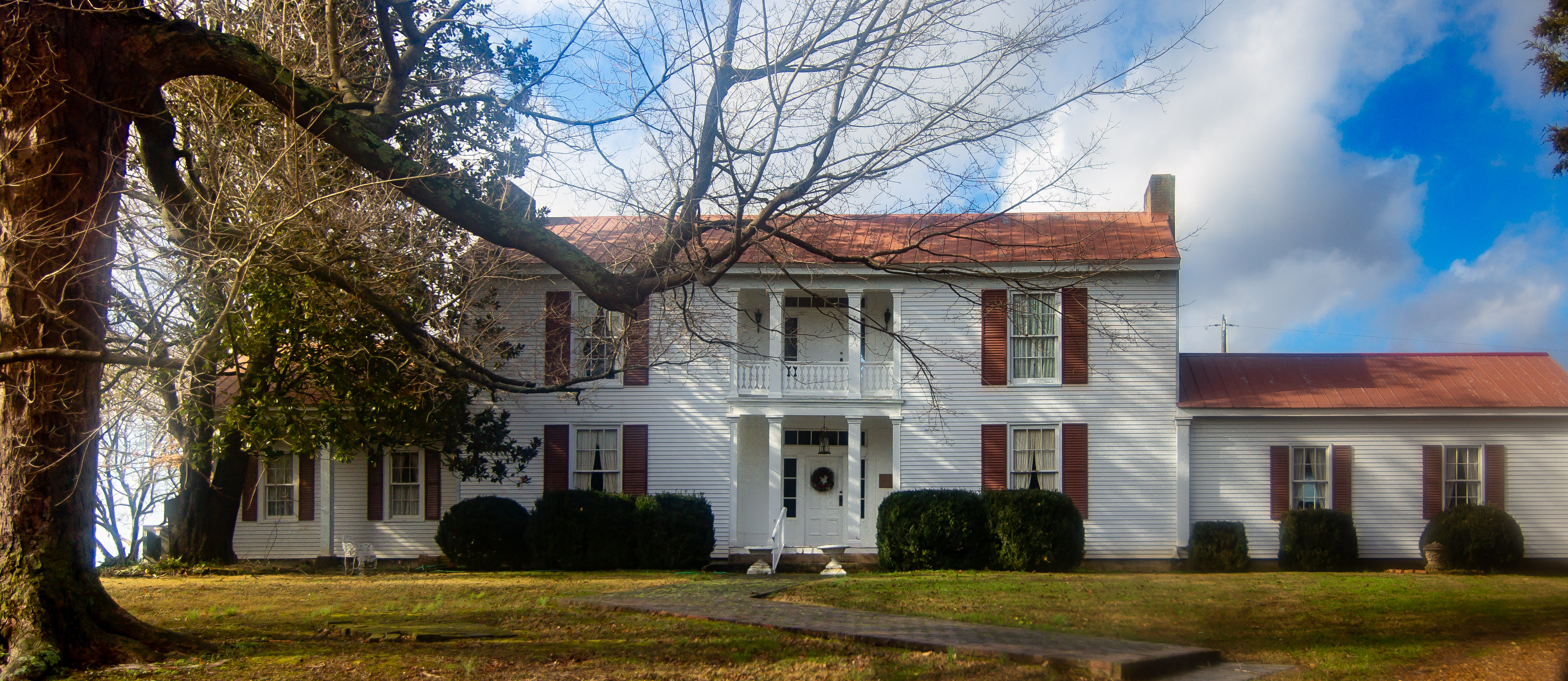
- Cornsilk

- Location within Tennessee
- Interactive map showing the location of Cornsilk
- Nearest city: Cross Plains, Tennessee
- Coordinates: 36°38′06″N 86°37′54″W
- Area: 7 acres (2.8 ha)
- Built: 1850
- Architectural style: Tennessee Vernacular
- NRHP reference No.: 74002266
- Added to NRHP: January 11, 1974

Cornsilk is a historic house near Cross Plains, Tennessee, United States. It was built circa 1850 for Thomas Stringer. In the 1930s, it was acquired by author Andrew Nelson Lytle, who renamed it "for his ancestral home in Alabama."

The house was designed in the Tennessee Vernacular architectural style. It has been listed on the National Register of Historic Places since January 11, 1974.
