= Rock Jolly =

Historic house in Tennessee, United States

- U.S. National Register of Historic Places
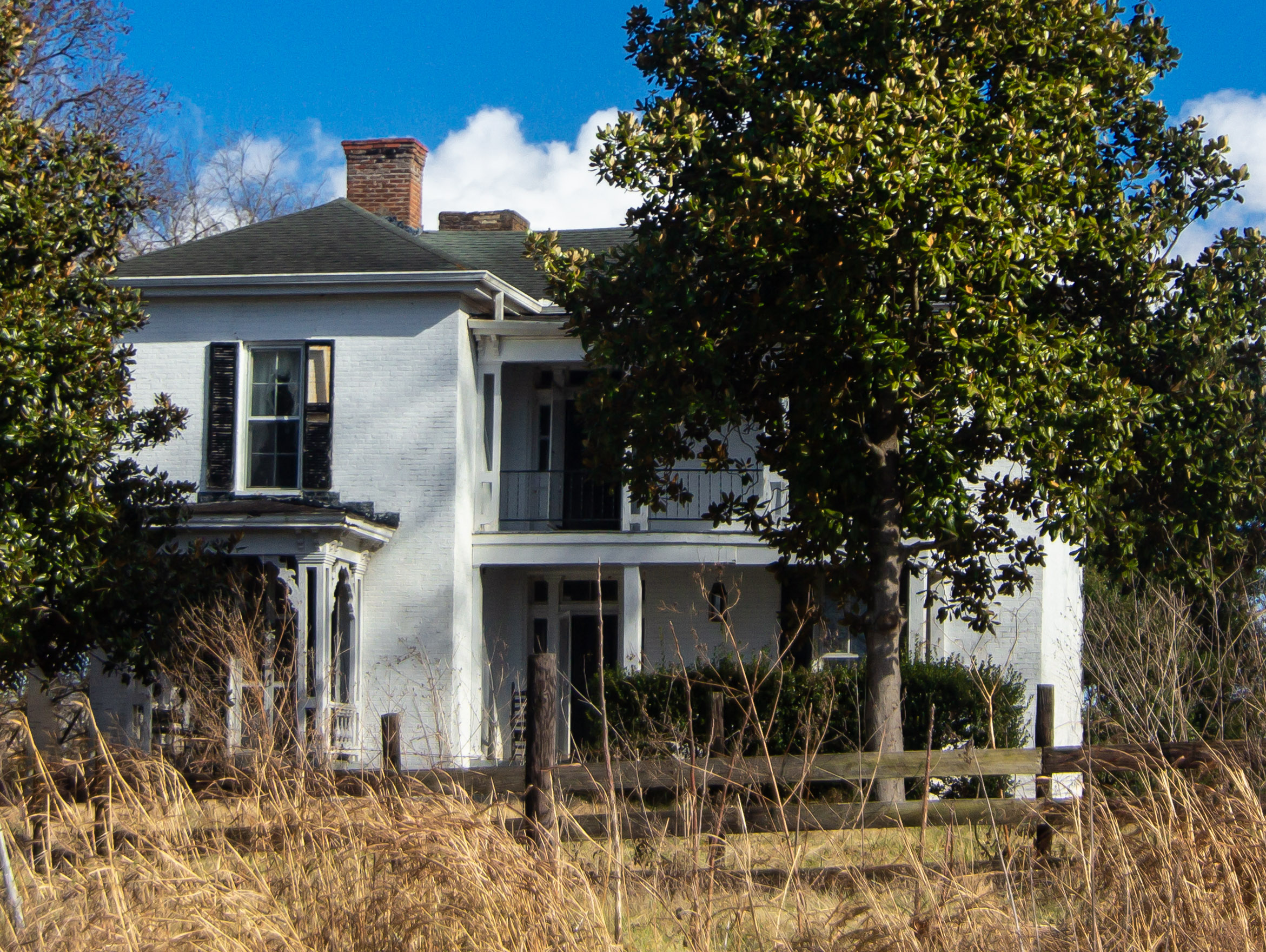
- Rock Jolly

- Location within Tennessee
- Location: Off Tennessee State Route 52 northeast of Cross Plains, Tennessee
- Coordinates: 36°34′44″N 86°37′23″W
- Area: 7 acres (2.8 ha)
- Built: 1830
- Architectural style: Federal
- NRHP reference No.: 73001819
- Added to NRHP: October 30, 1973

Rock Jolly is a historic house near Cross Plains, Tennessee, U.S..

The house was built circa 1830 for William Johnson, a farmer. The origin of the name is unknown. It has been owned by the Buntin family since 1939; they descend from settler James Robertson and early Nashville mayor Joseph Thorpe Elliston.

The house was designed in the Federal architectural style. It has been listed on the National Register of Historic Places since October 30, 1973.
