= The Beeches (Springfield, Tennessee) =

Historic house in Tennessee, United States

- U.S. National Register of Historic Places
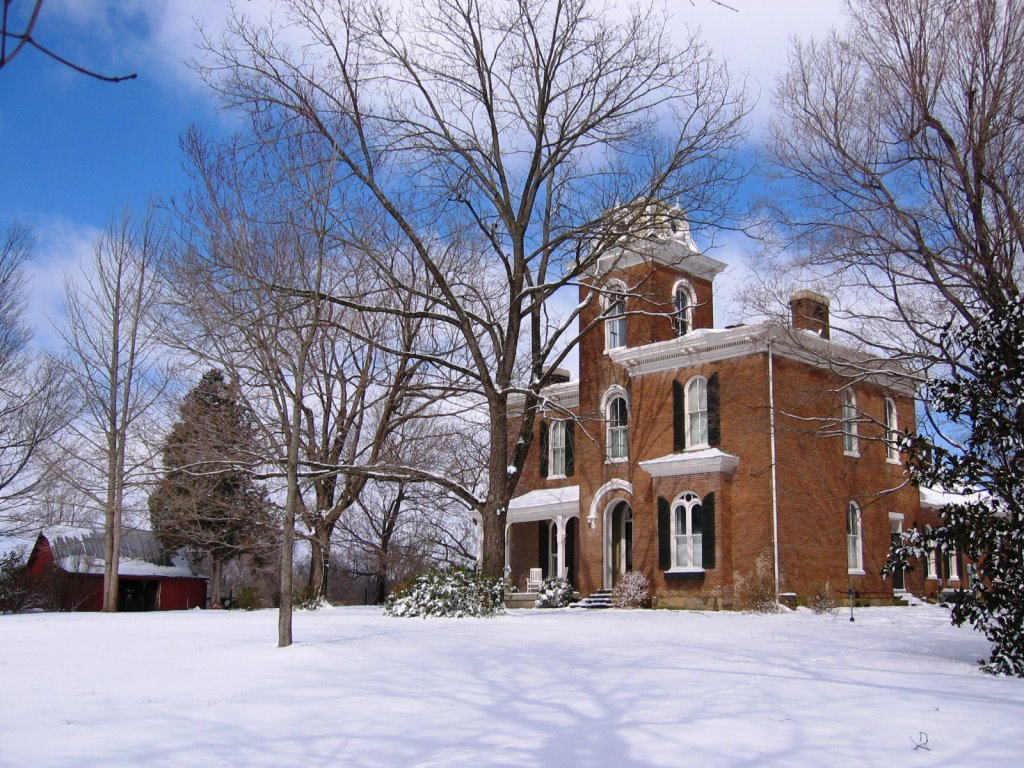

- Location within Tennessee Location within the United States
- Nearest city: Springfield, Tennessee
- Coordinates: 36°31′15″N 86°51′18″W
- Area: 2.5 acres (1.0 ha)
- Built: 1869
- Built by: John Woodard
- Architectural style: Italian Villa
- NRHP reference No.: 82004037
- Added to NRHP: March 25, 1982

The Beeches is a historic mansion near Springfield, Tennessee, United States.

== History ==
The mansion was completed in 1869. It was designed in the Italianate architectural style. It was built for John Woodard, who served in the Tennessee House of Representatives. He gifted the mansion to his son, Albert G. Woodard, in 1889. By 1938, the property was sold to J.W. Helm. By the 1980s, it belonged to Robert Brown, Jr.

It has been listed on the National Register of Historic Places since March 25, 1982.

The Home is currently a private residence.
