= Sudley Place =

Historic house in Tennessee, United States

- U.S. National Register of Historic Places
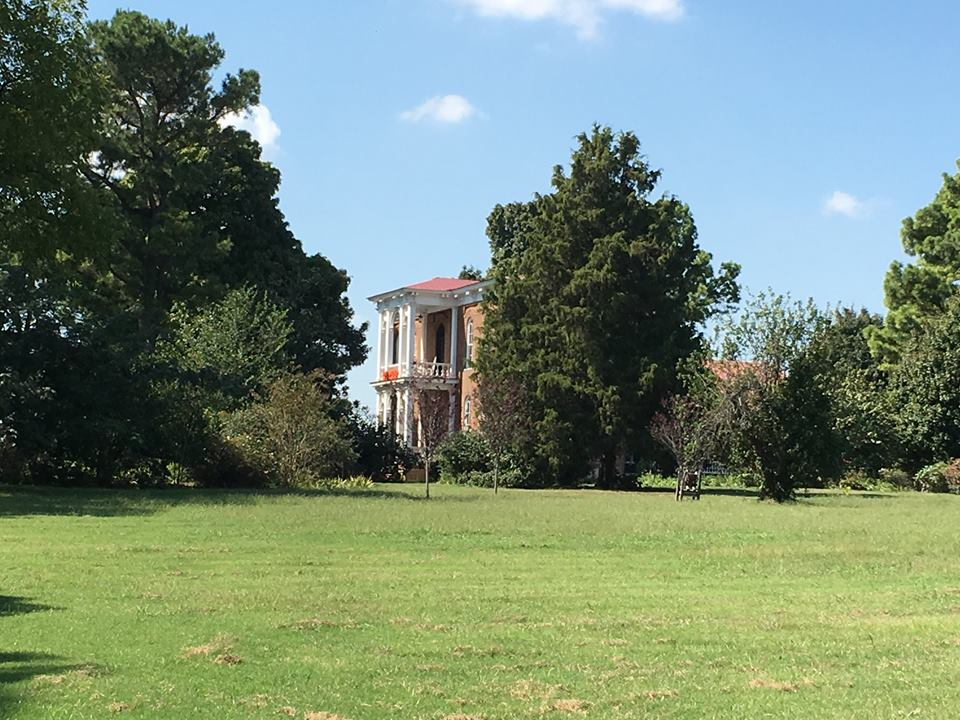
- Sudley Place in 2017

- Location within Tennessee Location within the United States
- Nearest city: Youngville, Tennessee
- Coordinates: 36°38′40″N 86°48′56″W
- Area: 8 acres (3.2 ha)
- Built by: Dr. Samuel Bowling Brown
- Architectural style: Italianate
- NRHP reference No.: 74001925
- Added to NRHP: January 11, 1974

Sudley Place is a historic mansion in Robertson County, Tennessee, U.S.. It was built in 1856 for Samuel Bowling Brown, a whiskey distiller. It was purchased by the Fuqua family in the 1930s. Democratic politician Jesse H. Jones, who served as the 9th United States Secretary of Commerce from 1940 to 1945, grew up in the house.

The house was designed in the Italianate architectural style. It has been listed on the National Register of Historic Places since January 11, 1974.
