= Joseph W. Byrns Jr. =

American attorney and politician (1903-1973)

Joseph Wellington Byrns Jr.
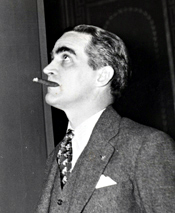

Member of the U.S. House of Representatives from Tennessee's 5th district
- In office January 3, 1939 – January 3, 1941
- Preceded by: Richard Merrill Atkinson
- Succeeded by: Percy Priest

Personal details
- Born: Joseph Wellington Byrns Jr. August 15, 1903 Davidson County, Tennessee, U.S.
- Died: March 8, 1973 (aged 69) Daytona Beach, Florida, U.S.
- Party: Democratic
- Spouse(s): Cornelia Park; Lillie (Warmack) Adams
- Education: Vanderbilt University Vanderbilt University Law School
- Profession: Attorney

Military service
- Allegiance: United States of America
- Branch/service: United States Army
- Years of service: 1942–1945
- Rank: Captain
- Battles/wars: World War II

Joseph Wellington Byrns Jr. (August 15, 1903 – March 8, 1973) was an American attorney and one-term U.S. Representative from Tennessee.

== Biography ==
Byrns was born in Davidson County, Tennessee, the son of former House Speaker Joseph W. Byrns and Julia Woodard. He completed his schooling at the Emerson Institute in Washington, D.C. in 1923 while his father was serving in Congress. In 1928, he graduated from the Vanderbilt University Law School and was admitted to the bar the same year. Byrns was first married to Cornelia Park in 1929, but the marriage ended in divorce. It is said that Cornelia liked being Mrs. Joseph W. Byrns Jr., and for the rest of her life refused to acknowledge the divorce. Byrns later enjoyed a happy marriage to Mrs. Lillie (Warmack) Adams of Goodlettsville, Tennessee.

== Career ==
From 1930 to 1938, Byrns was a member of the reserve component of the former Army Air Corps, where he became a captain.

In 1938, Byrns won the Democratic nomination for his father's old House seat and was elected to that office in November of that year. He served that one term, from January 3, 1939 to January 3, 1941, and won the Democratic nomination for a second one in 1940. His vote for an amendment that would have postponed the operation of the Selective Service Act by 60 days helped to inspire opposition from an independent candidate named Percy Priest, who was a member of the editorial staff of the Nashville Tennessean. Priest defeated Byrns by a 50%-43% margin (24,565 votes to 20,933 votes, with 3,459 votes going to the Republican nominee). After his defeat, he resumed the practice of law.

Byrns served on active duty in the United States Army during World War II, from June 23, 1942 until August 17, 1945, almost all of this time in the European Theater of Operations.

Although Byrns achieved some stature during his life, he was always overshadowed by the successes and popularity of his father. Afterwards, he retired to Florida.

== Death ==
Byrns died in Daytona Beach, Florida, on March 8, 1973, aged 69, and is interred at Mount Olivet Cemetery in Nashville along with his parents and second wife.

U.S. House of Representatives
| Preceded by Richard M. Atkinson | Member of the U.S. House of Representatives from Tennessee's 5th congressional district 1939-1941 | Succeeded by Percy Priest |
