= Walton Hall =

Walton Hall may refer to:

- Walton Hall, Cheshire
- Walton Hall, Chesterfield
- Walton Hall, Liverpool
- Walton Hall Park in Liverpool
- Walton Hall, Milton Keynes in Buckinghamshire
- Walton Hall, Staffordshire
- Walton Hall, Walton-on-Trent
- Walton Hall, Warwickshire
- Walton Hall, West Yorkshire

== See also ==
- Walton House (disambiguation)
