= Russell House (Springfield, Tennessee) =

Historic house in Tennessee, United States

- U.S. National Register of Historic Places
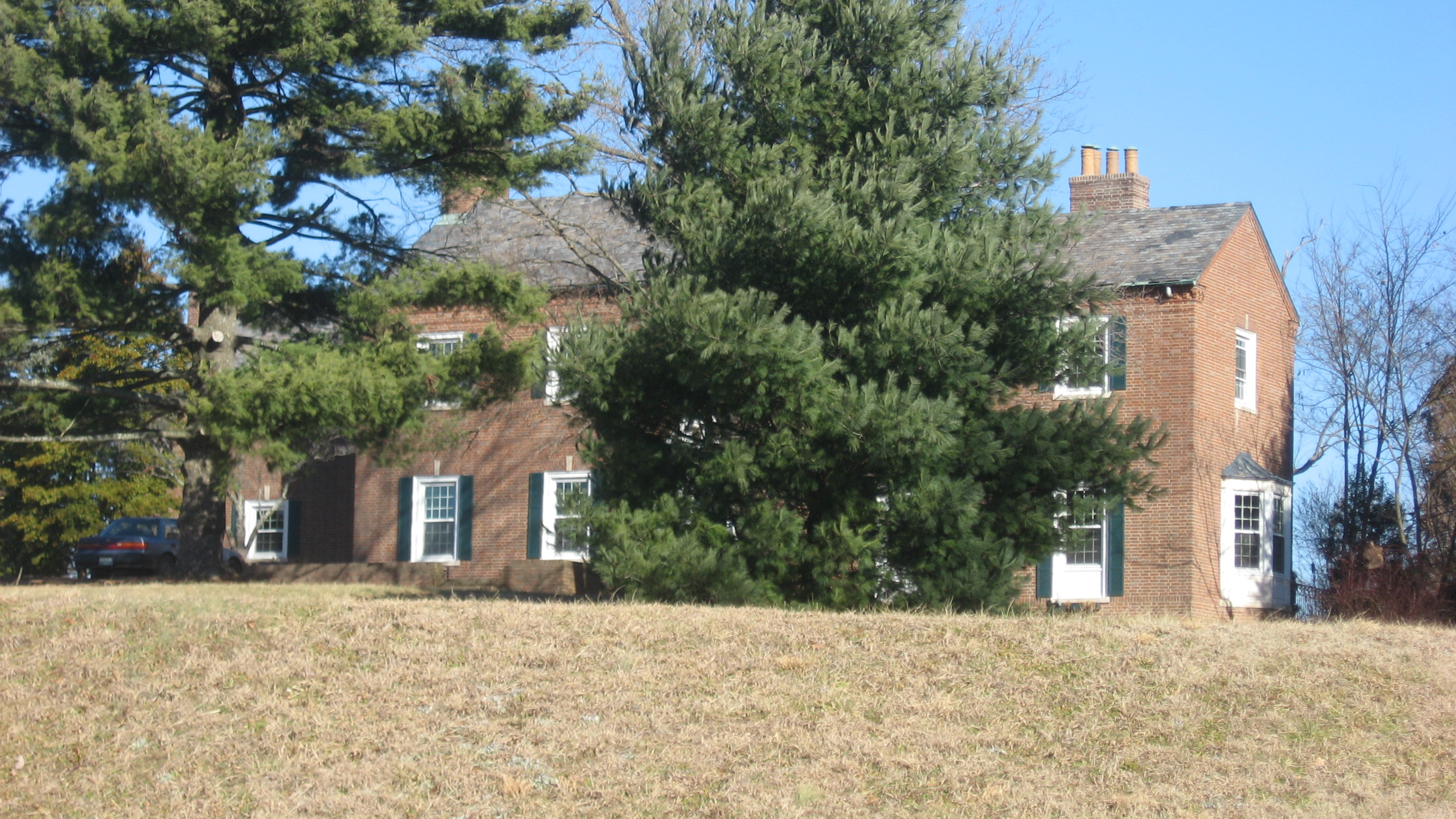
- The Russell House in 2014

- Location within Tennessee Location within the United States
- Nearest city: Springfield, Tennessee
- NRHP reference No.: 11000458
- Added to NRHP: November 22, 2011

Russell House is a historic mansion in Springfield, Tennessee, USA. It was designed in the Colonial Revival architectural style. It was listed on the National Register of Historic Places on November 22, 2011.

== History ==
Julia Russell (1898-1971) was the daughter of a leading local tobacco merchant and land owner Col. William Henry Simmons. She married Wilfred Russell, a Canadian businessman, in 1925, and he soon moved to Springfield to work in the tobacco business. About the same time, her sister Mary married Wilfred's former business partner, William Stephenson.

Julia bought 71.2 acres of land that the house stands on in April 1933 from E. S. Moore and the house was built c. 1935. Though the house is now within the Springfield city limits, the area was agricultural at the time and the Russells had tobacco fields near the house.

The Russell House was purchased in December 2011 by Greg and Stephanie Lee who rent it for weddings and special events.

In 2018, a Holiday Inn opened up in the front lot of the house.
