= Jo Byrns High School =

Public school near Cedar Hill, Tennessee

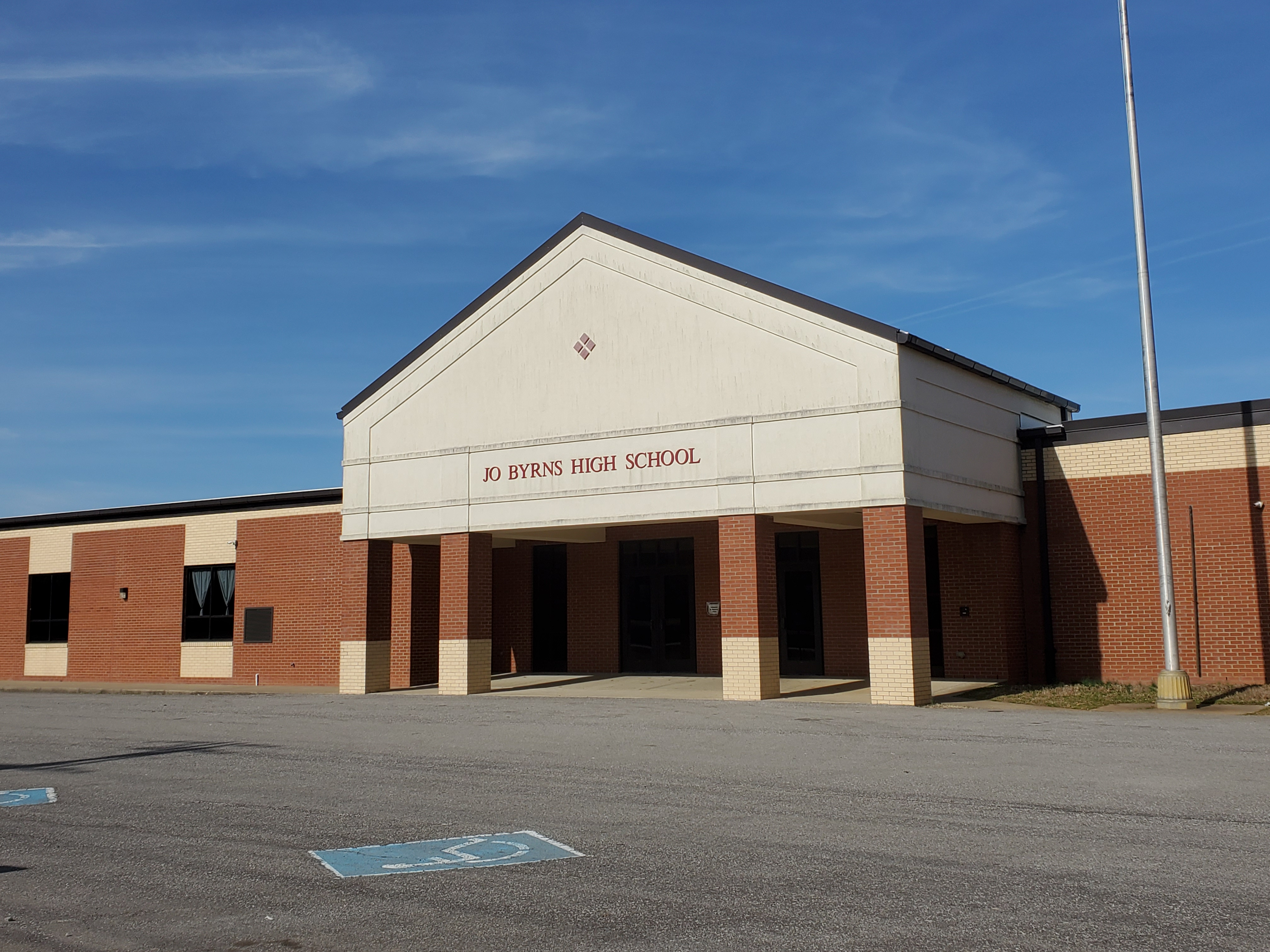
- The school's main entrance in 2020

Location
- 7025 U.S. Route 41, Cedar Hill, Tennessee; 37032; United States
- Coordinates: 36.5662°N 87.0262°W

Information
- Other names: JBHS
- Type: Public high school
- Established: 1974
- School district: Robertson County Schools
- Director: Danny Weeks
- Principal: Jeff Haines
- Grades: 6–12
- Enrollment: 538 (2024–2025)
- Colors: Red; White
- Mascot: Red Devils
- Website: jbhs.rcstn.net

Jo Byrns High School is a public high school near Cedar Hill, Tennessee. It is part of Robertson County School district. The school has 559 students in grades 6–12.

The school is named after Jo Byrns, the 41st Speaker of the United States House of Representatives, who was born and raised in Cedar Hill. Jo Byrns High School was a K–12 school, until Jo Byrns Elementary School opened in August 2006, making Jo Byrns High School a 6–12 school.

== Notable alumni ==
- Leanne Morgan '83, comedian
