= John F. House =

American politician (1827–1904)

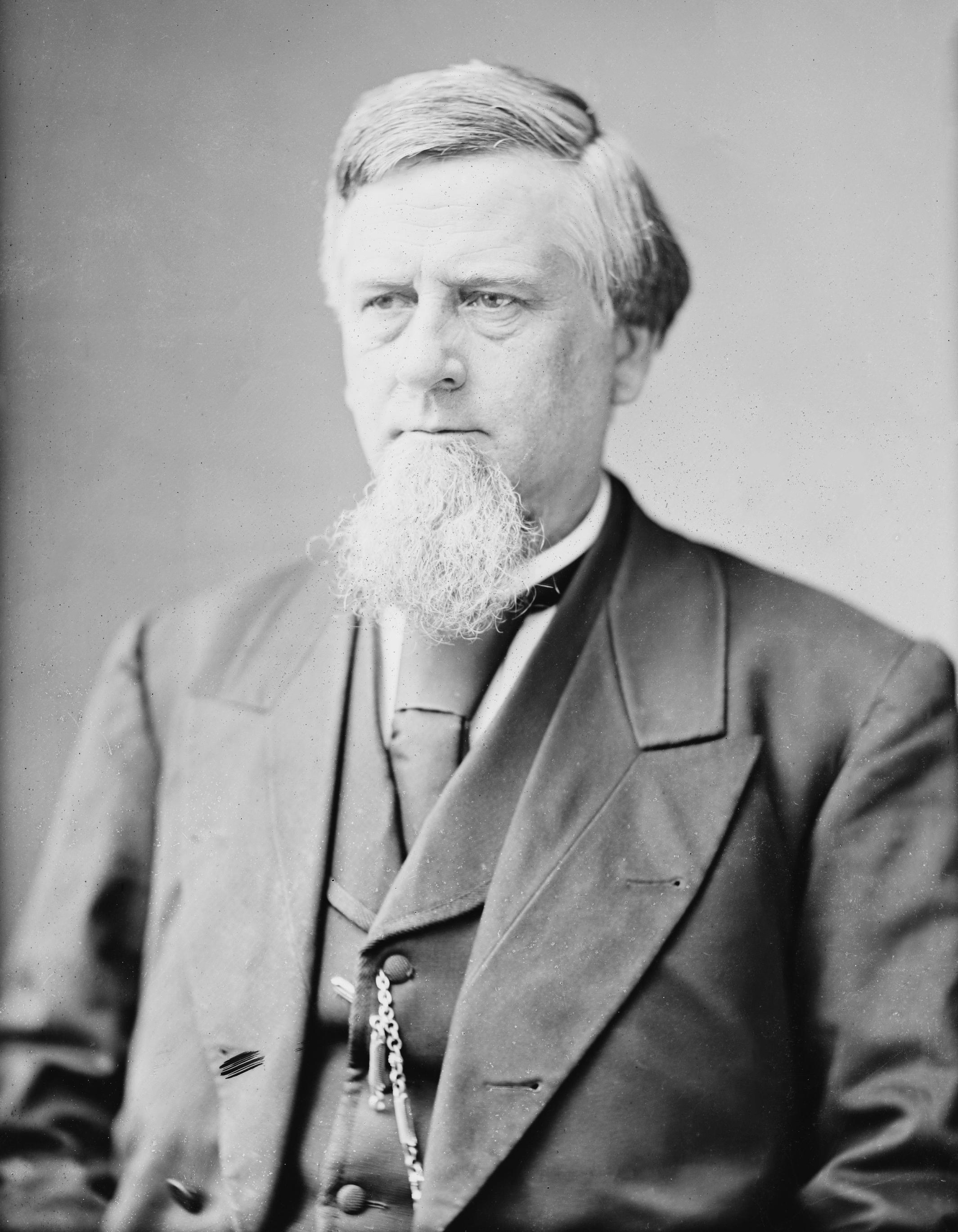
- House, 1865–1880

Chairman of the House Democratic Caucus
- In office March 4, 1879 – March 3, 1881
- Speaker: Samuel J. Randall
- Preceded by: Hiester Clymer
- Succeeded by: George W. Geddes (1883)

Member of the U.S. House of Representatives from Tennessee's 6th district
- In office March 4, 1875 – March 3, 1883
- Preceded by: Washington C. Whitthorne
- Succeeded by: Andrew J. Caldwell

Member of the Tennessee House of Representatives
- In office 1853

Personal details
- Born: John Ford House; January 9, 1827 Williamson County, Tennessee, U.S.
- Died: June 28, 1904 (aged 77) Clarksville, Tennessee, U.S.
- Party: Democratic
- Spouse: Julia Franklin Beech House
- Education: Transylvania University Lebanon Law School
- Profession: Politician; lawyer; politician

John Ford House (January 9, 1827 – June 28, 1904) was an American politician and a member of the United States House of Representatives for Tennessee's 6th congressional district.

== Biography ==
House was born on January 9, 1827, near Franklin, Tennessee, in Williamson County. He attended the local academy and the Transylvania University in Lexington, Kentucky. He graduated with a law degree from Cumberland University in 1850, was admitted to the bar, and commenced practice in Franklin, Tennessee.

== Career ==
House moved to Montgomery County, Tennessee, and was a member of the Tennessee House of Representatives in 1853 and a presidential elector on the Constitutional Union ticket of Bell and Everett in 1860. He was a member of the Provisional Congress of the Confederacy from Tennessee. During the American Civil War, he enlisted in the Confederate States Army and served until paroled in Columbus, Mississippi, in June 1865. He was a delegate to the Democratic National Convention in 1868. He was a member of the Tennessee state constitutional convention in 1870.

Elected as a Democrat to the Forty-fourth Congress and the three succeeding Congresses, House served from March 4, 1875, to March 3, 1883. He was not a candidate for renomination in 1882, and resumed the practice of law.

== Death ==
House died in Clarksville, Tennessee, on June 28, 1904 (age 77 years, 171 days). He is interred at Greenwood Cemetery.

Confederate States House of Representatives
| Preceded by none | Representative to the Provisional Confederate Congress from Tennessee; 1861 | Succeeded by none |
U.S. House of Representatives
| Preceded by Washington C. Whitthorne | Member of the U.S. House of Representatives from Tennessee's 6th congressional district 1875–1883 | Succeeded by Andrew J. Caldwell |
