= Richard Merrill Atkinson =

American politician (1894–1947)

Member of the U.S. House of Representatives from Tennessee's 5th district
- In office January 3, 1937 – January 3, 1939
- Preceded by: Jo Byrns
- Succeeded by: Jo Byrns Jr.

Personal details
- Born: February 6, 1894 Nashville, Tennessee, U.S.
- Died: April 29, 1947 (aged 53) Nashville, Tennessee, U.S.
- Party: Democratic
- Education: Wallace University; Vanderbilt University; Cumberland School of Law
- Profession: Attorney, politician

Military service
- Allegiance: United States of America
- Branch/service: United States Marine Corps
- Years of service: June 30, 1917 to August 29, 1919
- Rank: Private
- Unit: Forty-seventh Company, Second Division; France
- Battles/wars: World War I

Richard Merrill Atkinson (February 6, 1894 – April 29, 1947) was an American politician and a U.S. Representative from Tennessee.

== Biography ==
Atkinson was born in Nashville, Tennessee, and attended the public schools. He graduated from Wallace University School, Nashville, Tennessee, in 1912, from Vanderbilt University, Nashville, Tennessee, in 1916, and from Cumberland School of Law at Cumberland University, Lebanon, Tennessee, in 1917. Admitted to the bar in 1917, he commenced the practice of law in Nashville, in 1920.

During the First World War, Atkinson served from June 30, 1917, until honorably discharged on August 29, 1919. He was a member of the Forty-seventh Company, United States Marine Corps, Second Division, serving in France with the American Expeditionary Forces.

He served as Attorney general of the tenth judicial circuit of Tennessee from September 1, 1926, to September 1, 1934. He was also State commissioner of Smoky Mountain National Park from 1931 to 1933.

Atkinson was elected as a Democrat to the Seventy-fifth Congress, and served from January 3, 1937, to January 3, 1939. He was an unsuccessful candidate for renomination in 1938, and returned to the practice of law in Nashville, Tennessee, until his death.

== Death ==
Atkinson died in Nashville, Davidson County, Tennessee, on April 29, 1947. He is interred at Spring Hill Cemetery, Madison, Tennessee.

U.S. House of Representatives
Preceded by Jo Byrns	Member of the U.S. House of Representatives from Tennessee's 5th congressional district 1937-1939	Succeeded by Jo Byrns Jr.
