= William Randolph House =

- U.S. National Register of Historic Places
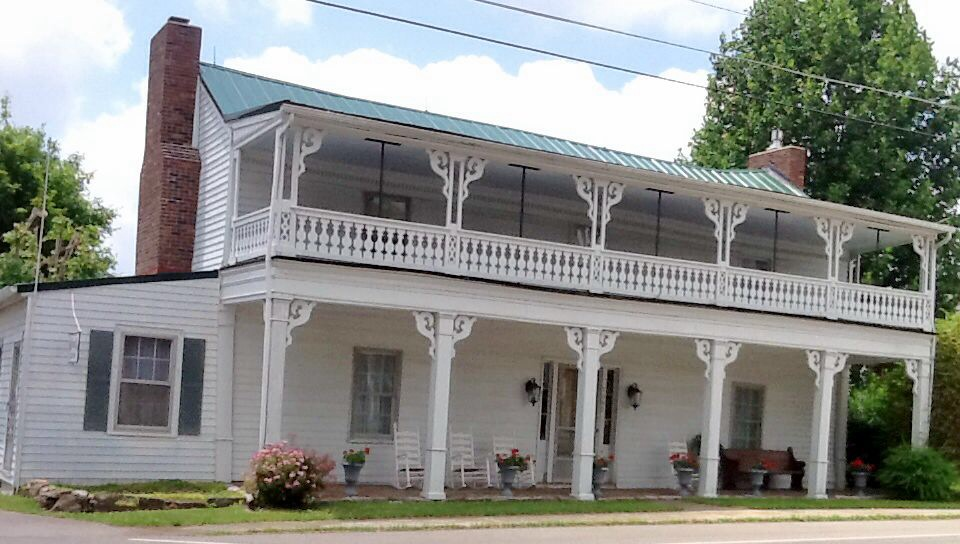
- The William Randolph House in 2014

- Location within Tennessee Location within the United States
- Location: On TN 25, Cross Plains, Tennessee
- Coordinates: 36°32′54″N 86°41′52″W
- Area: 3 acres (1.2 ha)
- Built by: William Randolph
- NRHP reference No.: 73001818
- Added to NRHP: October 30, 1973

The William Randolph House is a historic house in Cross Plains, Tennessee, U.S.. It was built by William Randolph in 1816, and expanded by Captain William Villines in 1830. It served both as a private residence and as an inn; it was also the post office from 1828 to 1969. It has been listed on the National Register of Historic Places since October 30, 1973.
