= The Velvet Horn =

1957 novel by Andrew Nelson Lytle

- First edition (publ. McDowell, Obolensky)
- Authors: Andrew Nelson Lytle
- Language: English
- Genre: novel
- Publication date: 1957

The Velvet Horn is a 1957 novel by American novelist Andrew Nelson Lytle. At the time of its publication, it was very well received both because of its ambitious scope, complex and dynamic style, mythical character and diversity of characters. Because of these characteristics, some critics compared the novel to James Joyce's Ulysses.
