= John W. Gaines =

American politician (1860–1926)

John Wesley Gaines
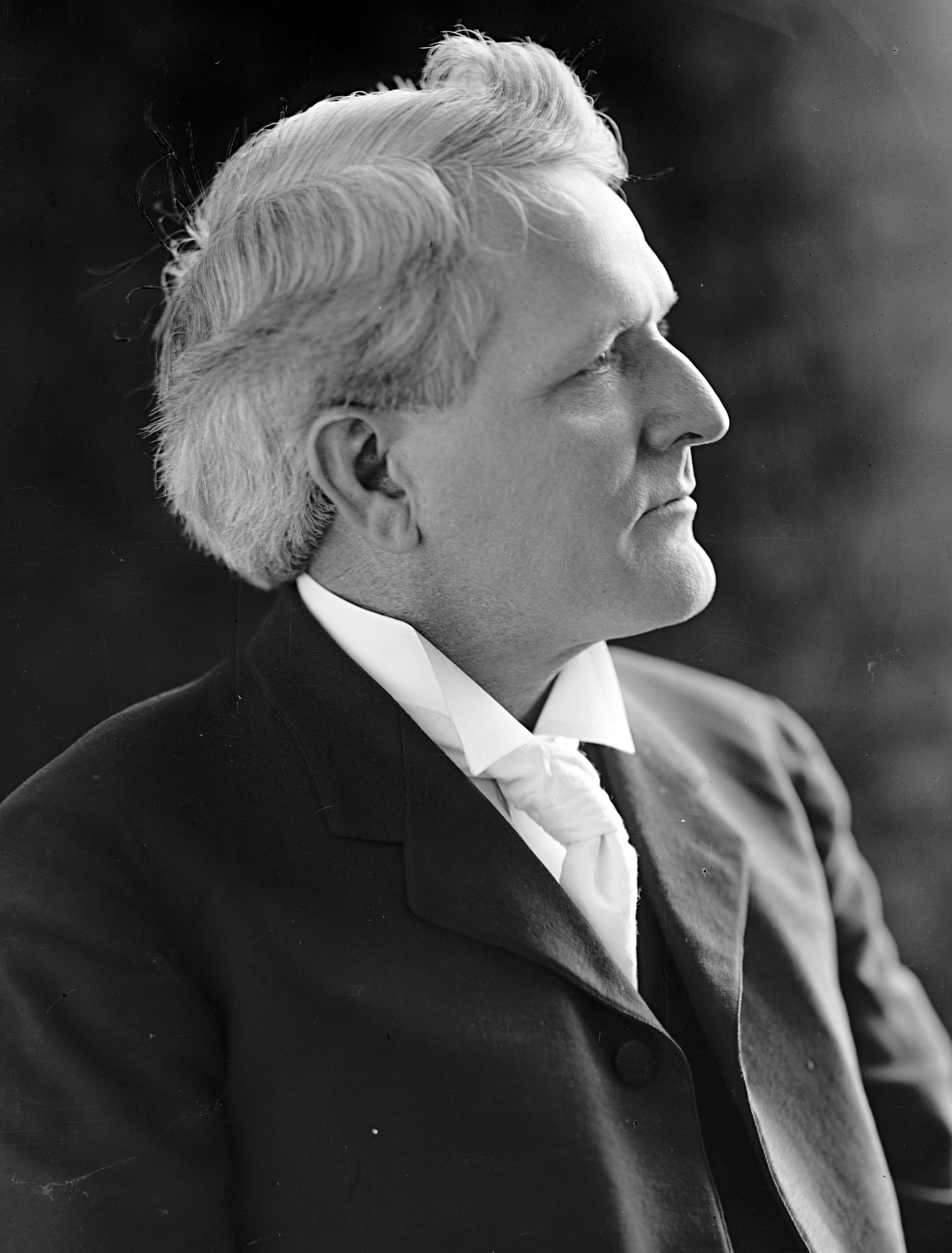

Member of the U.S. House of Representatives from Tennessee's 6th district
- In office March 4, 1897 – March 3, 1909
- Preceded by: Joseph E. Washington
- Succeeded by: Jo Byrns

Personal details
- Born: August 24, 1860 Davidson County, Tennessee, U.S.
- Died: July 4, 1926 (aged 65) Nashville, Tennessee, U.S.
- Party: Democratic
- Education: University of Nashville Vanderbilt University
- Profession: Attorney; politician

John Wesley Gaines (August 24, 1860 – July 4, 1926) was an American politician and a member of the United States House of Representatives for the 6th congressional district of Tennessee.

== Biography ==
Gaines was born in Wrecoe, near Nashville, Tennessee, in Davidson County. He attended private and public schools, in which he also taught. He studied law at home, studied medicine, and graduated from the University of Nashville. He graduated from the Vanderbilt University in Nashville, Tennessee in 1882. He never practiced medicine, but the day after graduation he resumed the study of law. He was admitted to the bar in 1884 and commenced practice in Nashville in 1885.

== Career ==
Elected as a Democrat to the Fifty-fifth and the five succeeding Congresses, Gaines served from March 4, 1897, to March 3, 1909. He was an unsuccessful candidate for re-election in 1908 to the 61st U.S. Congress, losing in the primary to Francis Gracey Childers. He continued to practice law in Nashville, Tennessee.

== Death ==
On July 4, 1926, Gaines died in Nashville. He is interred at Mount Olivet Cemetery.

U.S. House of Representatives
Preceded by Joseph E. Washington	Member of the U.S. House of Representatives from Tennessee's 6th congressional district 1897–1909	Succeeded by Jo Byrns
