= Andrew Jackson Caldwell =

American politician (1837–1906)

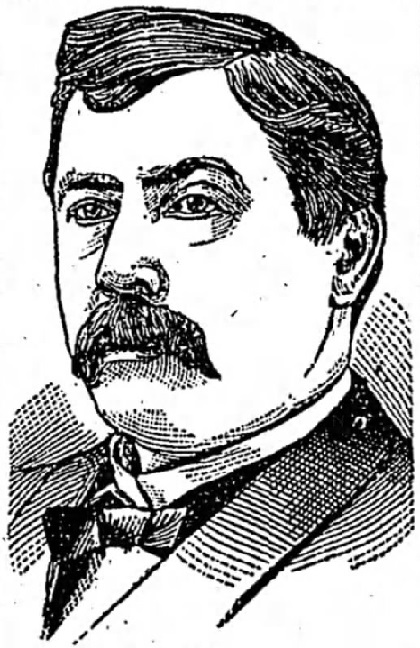
- From the August 8, 1886 edition of The Daily American (Nashville, TN).

Member of the U.S. House of Representatives from Tennessee's 6th district
- In office March 4, 1883 – March 3, 1887
- Preceded by: John Ford House
- Succeeded by: Joseph E. Washington

Member of the Tennessee House of Representatives
- In office 1880; 1882

Personal details
- Born: July 22, 1837 Montevallo, Alabama, U.S.
- Died: November 22, 1906 (aged 69) Nashville, Tennessee, U.S.
- Citizenship: United States
- Party: Democratic
- Spouse: Martha Hinton Phillips Caldwell
- Children: Robert Caldwell; Maggie May Caldwell; Samuel Shackleford Caldwell; Andrew Jackson Caldwell; Roberta Caldwell Allen; Whorter Young Caldwell; May Phillip Caldwell
- Education: Franklin College, Tennessee
- Profession: Attorney; planter

Military service
- Allegiance: Confederate States of America
- Branch/service: Confederate States Army
- Rank: Major
- Unit: 1st Regiment, Tennessee Cavalry
- Battles/wars: American Civil War

Andrew Jackson Caldwell (July 22, 1837 – November 22, 1906) was a U.S. Representative from Tennessee.

== Biography ==
Andrew Jackson Caldwell was born in Montevallo, Alabama on July 22, 1837. He moved with his parents to Tennessee in 1844, settling near Nashville. He graduated from Franklin College, Tennessee, in 1854, and worked as a teacher in Nashville from 1854 to 1857. He then moved to Trenton to study law.

== Career ==
During the Civil War, Caldwell served in the Confederate States Army as a private and regimental quartermaster in the First Regiment, Tennessee Cavalry. After the war, he resumed his law studies and was admitted to the Tennessee bar in 1867. He returned to Nashville, to open a practice in law. He became attorney general for the district of Davidson and Rutherford Counties, Tennessee, serving in this capacity from 1870 to 1878. He also served as a member of the Tennessee House of Representatives in 1880 and 1882.

Caldwell was elected as a Democrat to the Forty-eighth and Forty-ninth Congresses (March 4, 1883 – March 3, 1887). He was not a candidate for reelection to the Fiftieth Congress, and resumed the practice of law.

== Death ==
Andrew Jackson Caldwell died in Nashville on November 22, 1906, (age 69 years, 123 days), and is interred at Mount Olivet Cemetery.

U.S. House of Representatives
Preceded by John F. House	Member of the U.S. House of Representatives from Tennessee's 6th congressional district 1883–1887	Succeeded by Joseph E. Washington
