= William M. McMurry House =

Historic house in Tennessee, United States

- William M McMurry House
- U.S. National Register of Historic Places
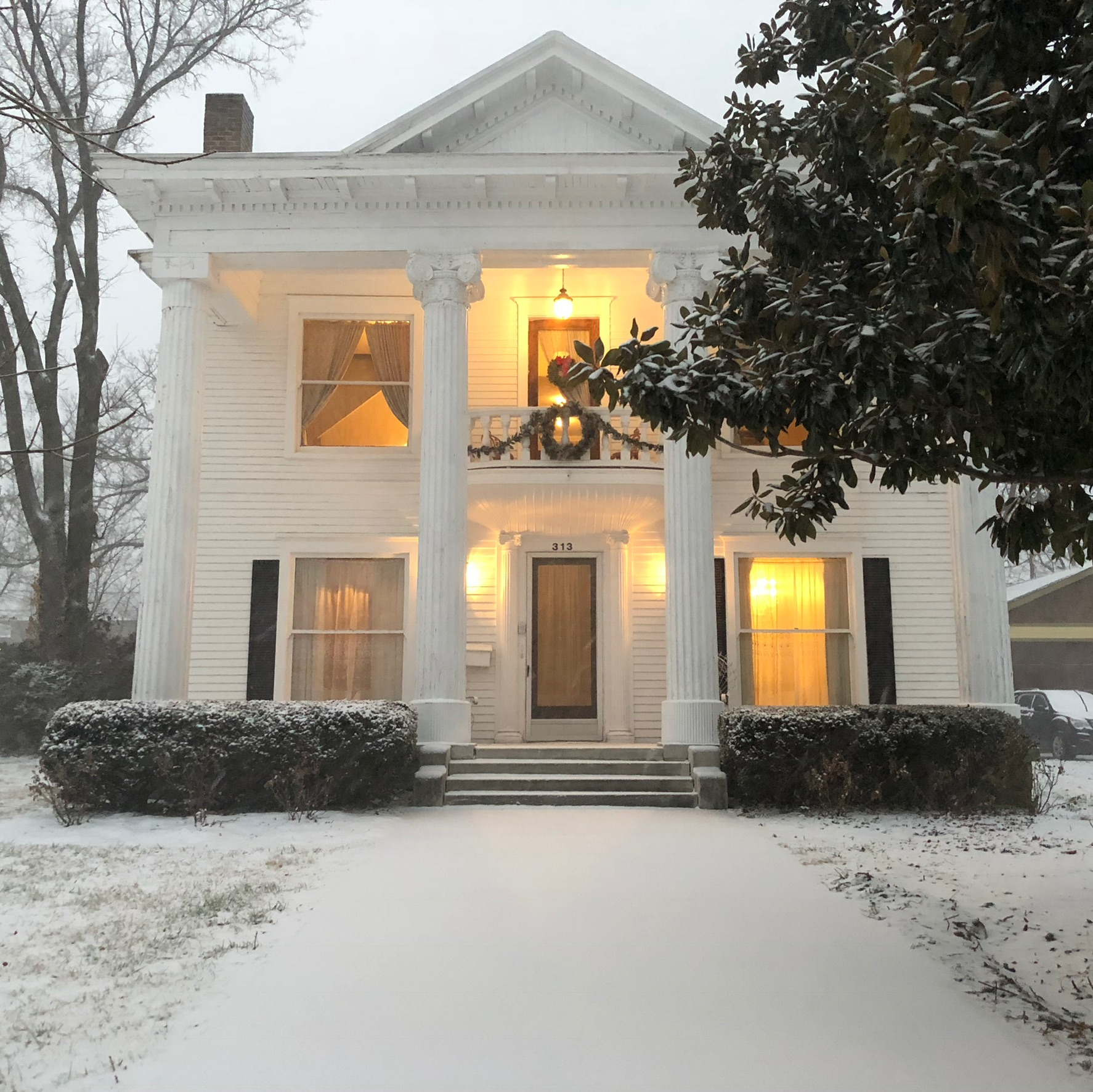

- Location within Tennessee Location within the United States
- Location: 313 N Main St; Springfield, Tennessee
- Coordinates: 36°30′44″N 86°53′06″W
- Built: 1896
- Architectural style: Greek Revival
- NRHP reference No.: 1000000904

The William M. McMurry House is a historic mansion in Springfield, Tennessee, U.S.. It was built in 1896 for William M. McMurry, "the founder of McMurry Loose Leaf Tobacco Company." It became a bed and breakfast in 2016, but was sold to Lisa and Jon Arnold as a private residence in 2017. It was listed on the National Register of Historic Places in 2017.
