= Highland Chapel Union Church =

Historic church in Tennessee, United States

- U.S. National Register of Historic Places
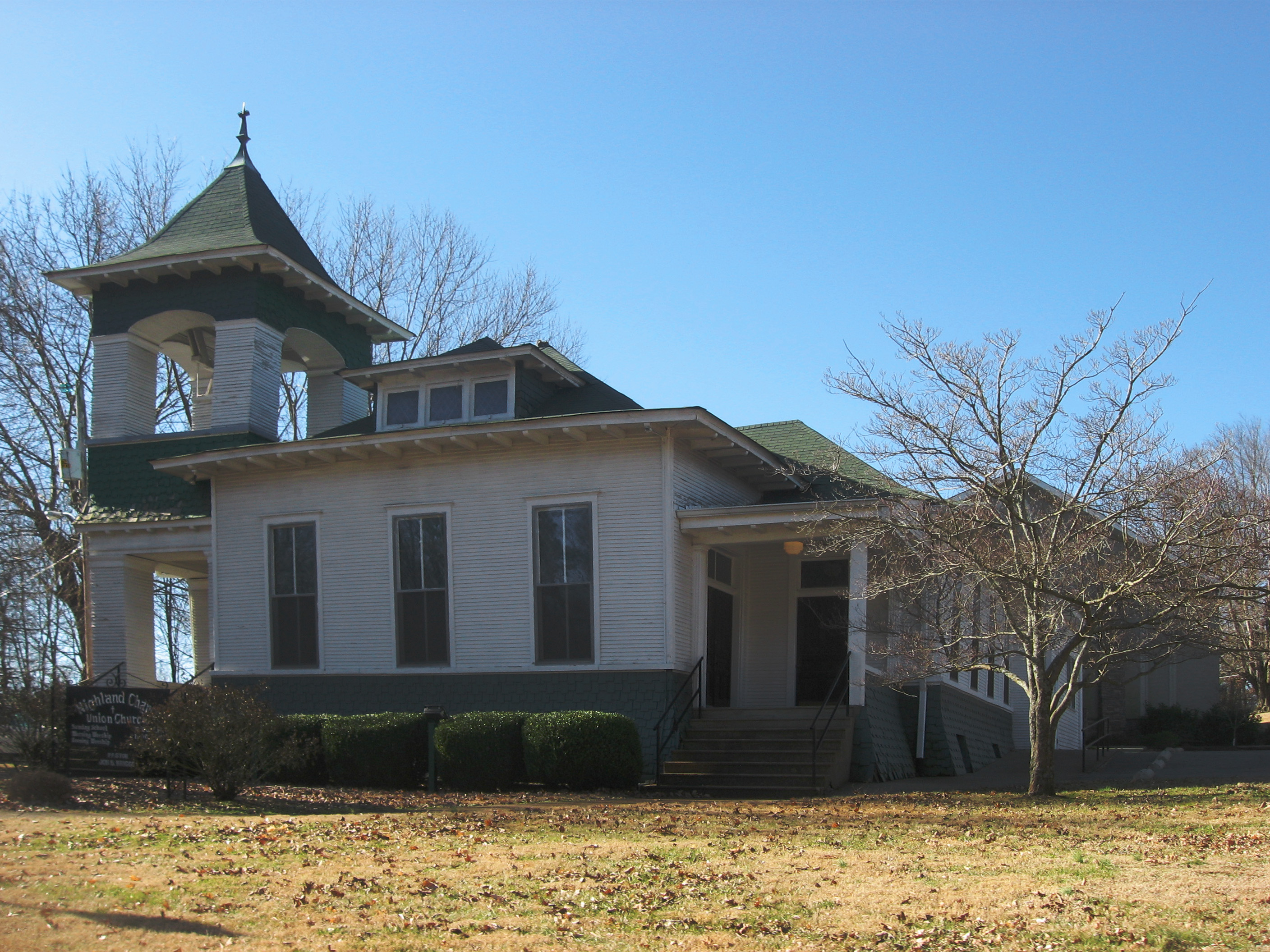
- Front and northwestern side

- Location within Tennessee Location within the United States
- Location: Highland Ave., Ridgetop, Tennessee
- Coordinates: 36°23′41″N 86°46′29″W
- Area: less than one acre
- Built: 1906
- Architectural style: Queen Anne
- NRHP reference No.: 91001592
- Added to NRHP: October 29, 1991

Highland Chapel Union Church is a historic nondenominational Protestant church on Highland Avenue in Ridgetop, Tennessee.

In the 19th century, before the church was established, children in the community attended Sunday school in their school building. Preachers of various different denominations conducted worship services from time to time, establishing a local pattern wherein congregants were unconcerned with denominational identity.

In 1890 this led to construction of the community's first church building, called Oak Dell Church. That church was destroyed by a fire in 1904 and replaced by the current church, which was built in 1906. In 1920 its name was changed from Oak Dell to Highland Chapel Union Church.

The church was added to the National Register of Historic Places in 1991.
