= Glenn House (Batesville, Arkansas) =

Historic house in Arkansas, United States

- U.S. National Register of Historic Places
- U.S. Historic district – Contributing property
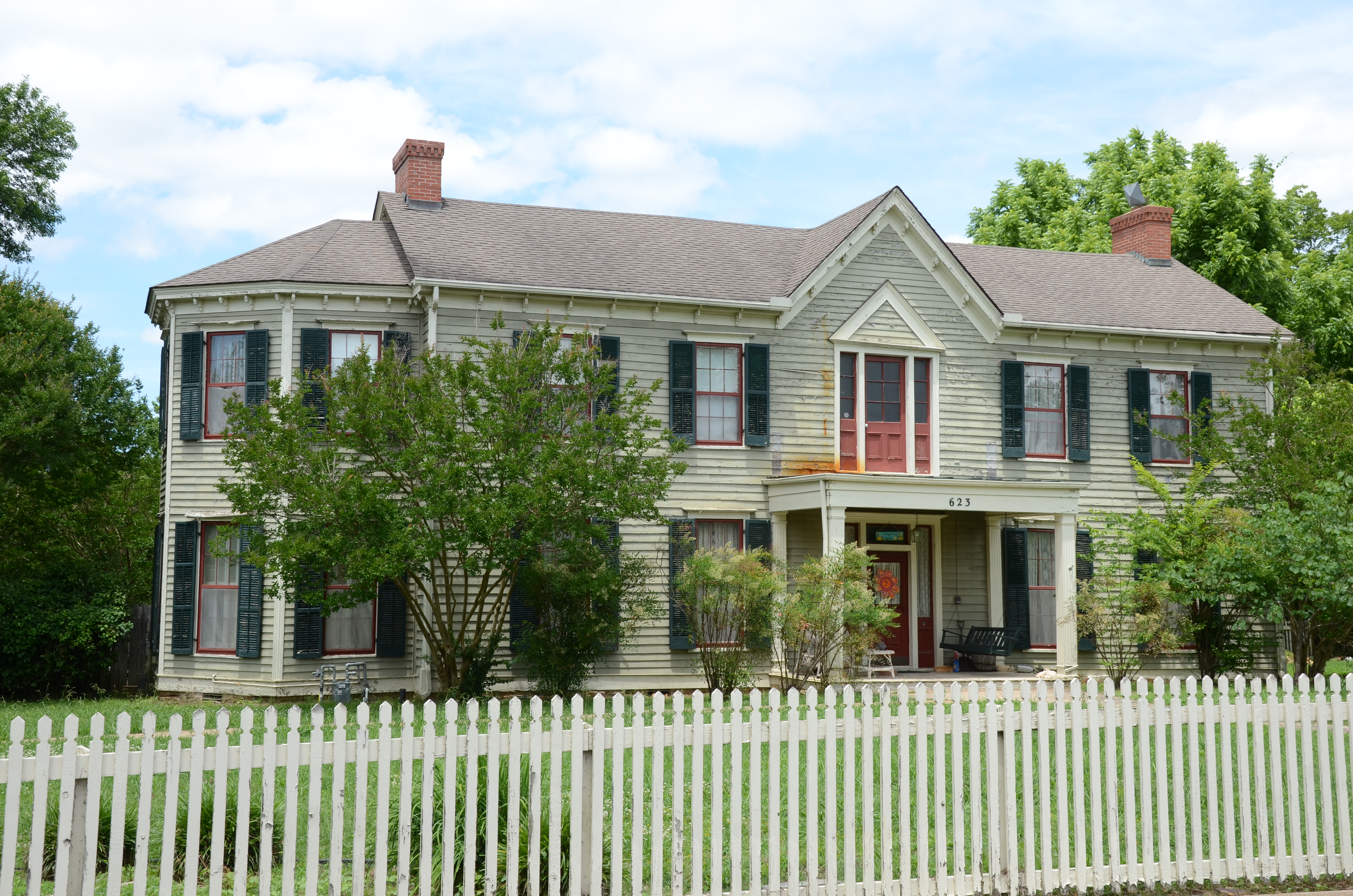

- Location within Arkansas Location within the United States
- Location: 653 Water St., Batesville, Arkansas
- Coordinates: 35°46′26″N 91°38′58″W
- Area: 2 acres (0.81 ha)
- Architectural style: Greek Revival, Victorian
- Part of: School Addition Historic District (ID06001315)
- NRHP reference No.: 75000389

Significant dates
- Added to NRHP: May 2, 1975
- Designated CP: February 1, 2007

The Glenn House is a historic house at 653 Water Street in Batesville, Arkansas. It is a 2 1/2-story wood-frame structure, five bays wide, with a side-gable roof and end chimneys. A porch with balcony above extends across the middle three bays, and there is a cross gable at the center, above the upper and lower doorways. The house is basically Greek Revival in character, although it has some later Victorian period alterations. It was built in 1850 to house the academic facilities of the Soulesbury Institute, and was from 1873 occupied by four generations of the Glenn family. It is one Batesville's most architecturally sophisticated houses.

The house was listed on the National Register of Historic Places in 1975.

== See also ==
- National Register of Historic Places listings in Independence County, Arkansas
