= Mollie and Neel Glenn House =

- U.S. National Register of Historic Places
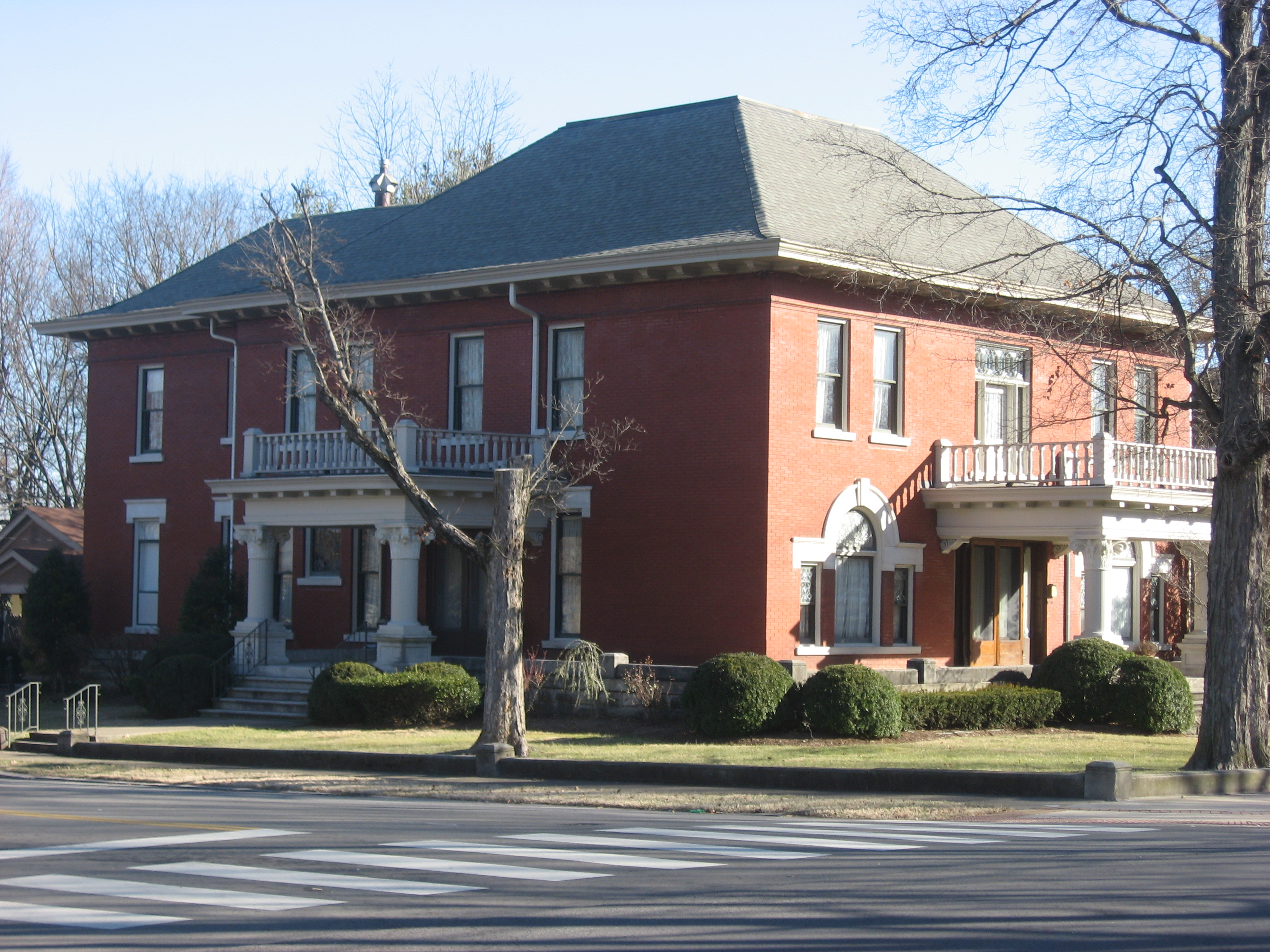
- The house in 2014

- Location within Tennessee Location within the United States
- Location: 307 5th Avenue, Springfield, Tennessee
- Coordinates: 36°30′36″N 86°53′17″W
- Area: less than one acre
- Built: 1906
- Architectural style: Classical Revival
- NRHP reference No.: 12000440
- Added to NRHP: July 25, 2012

The Mollie and Neel Glenn House is a historic house in Springfield, Tennessee, U.S..

The house was built for Neel Glenn and his wife, née Mollie Dulin, in 1906. Mollie died in 1946 and the ownership was transferred to the Springfield Federation of Women's Clubs. It was converted and used as a public library from 1946 to 1969.

The house was designed in the Colonial Revival architectural style, with elements of Italianate, Craftsman and Art Nouveau architecture. It has been listed on the National Register of Historic Places since July 25, 2012.
