= Woodard Hall =

Historic house in Tennessee, United States

- U.S. National Register of Historic Places
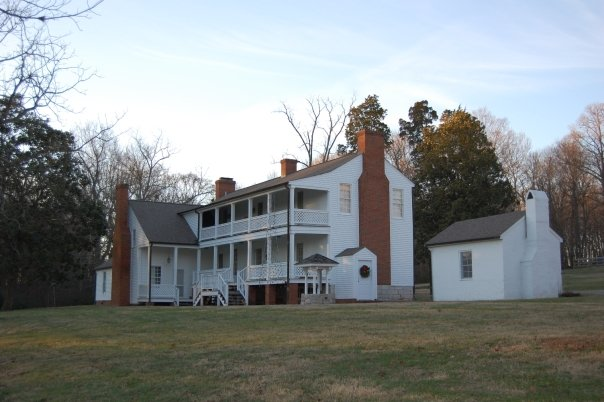

- Location within Tennessee Location within the United States
- Nearest city: Springfield, Tennessee
- Area: 225 acres (91 ha)
- Built: 1792
- MPS: Historic Family Farms in Middle Tennessee MPS
- NRHP reference No.: 75001775
- Added to NRHP: October 10, 1975

Woodard Hall is a historic mansion near Springfield, Tennessee, U.S. It was built circa 1792, and significantly remodelled by Colonel Wilie Woodard in 1854. It has been listed on the National Register of Historic Places since October 10, 1975.
