= The Long Night (novel) =

1936 novel by Andrew Nelson Lytle

- Author: Andrew Nelson Lytle
- Language: English
- Publisher: Bobbs-Merrill Company
- Publication date: 1936
- Publication place: United States
- Pages: 331

The Long Night is a 1936 novel by the American writer Andrew Nelson Lytle. It is set around Montgomery, Alabama from 1850 and 1865 and is about a man who becomes torn between the prospect of avenging his murdered father and duty in the American Civil War.

== Reception ==
Kirkus Reviews called it a good piece of Americana for "readers who enjoy lusty novels with war backgrounds".
