= Andrew Nelson Lytle =

American novelist, dramatist, essayist, and professor (1902–1995)

- Born: December 26, 1902; Murfreesboro, Tennessee, U.S.
- Died: December 12, 1995 (aged 92); Monteagle, Tennessee, U.S.

Academic background
- Education: Vanderbilt University (BA 1925); Yale University (1927–1929)

Academic work
- Discipline: Literature
- Institutions: Sewanee: The University of the South; University of Florida

Andrew Nelson Lytle (December 26, 1902 – December 12, 1995) was an American novelist, dramatist, essayist and professor of literature. He is known for his early associations with the Southern Agrarians as well as his novel The Velvet Horn (1957), which was nominated for the National Book Award. He was editor of The Sewanee Review 1961–1973 while a professor at Sewanee University.

== Early life ==
Andrew Nelson Lytle was born on December 26, 1902, in Murfreesboro, Tennessee, part of a farming family. His parents were Robert Logan Lytle and Lillie Belle Lytle. He was valedictorian of his class at Sewanee Military Academy, and he graduated from Vanderbilt University in 1925. He went on to attend Oxford University and the Yale University School of Drama 1927–1929 without earning a degree.

While Lytle was at Vanderbilt he wrote and acted in The Gold Tooth, a play that The Tennessean newspaper called "Vanderbilt's initial contribution ... to the Little Theatre Movement in Nashville." Another play he wrote while he was at Vanderbilt, The Lost Sheep, won a newspaper-sponsored contest.

== Career ==
Lytle's first literary success came as a result of his association with the Southern Agrarians, a movement whose members included poets Robert Penn Warren and Allen Tate, whom Lytle knew from Vanderbilt University. The group of poets, novelists and writers published the 1930s I'll Take My Stand, which expressed their philosophy. The work was controversial among contemporaries, and critical scholars believed it to be a reactionary and romanticized defense of the Old South and the Lost Cause of the Confederacy. Critics considered it to be moved by nostalgia.

In 1948, Lytle helped start the Master of Fine Arts program at the University of Florida. He was the novelist in residence there from 1948 to 1958, and he taught aspiring writers in a creative writing class.

Lytle first published a biography of Nathan Bedford Forrest, the Confederate general of the American Civil War: Bedford Forrest and his Critter Company (1931). Lytle went on to write more than a dozen books, including novels, collected short stories, and collections of essays on literary and cultural topics. He was awarded a Guggenheim Fellowship for his work in fiction in 1940, and then another in 1959. He won a The Kenyon Review fellowship for fiction in 1956.

Most critics consider The Velvet Horn (1957) to be Lytle's best work. It was nominated for the National Book Award for Fiction. His 1973 memoir, A Wake for the Living, is a tour-de-force in Southern storytelling, combining a deep religious sensibility, an expansive view of history that links events across decades and even centuries, and—sometimes—bawdy family tales.

Lytle served as editor of the Sewanee Review from 1961 to 1973 while he was a professor at the University of the South. During Lytle's tenure, the Review became one of the nation's most prestigious literary magazines. Lytle was an early champion of Flannery O'Connor's work. Lytle encouraged many writers, including Allen Tate and Robert Penn Warren, but also Elizabeth Bishop, Caroline Gordon, and Robert Lowell. His insightful criticism often improved their work.

Lytle taught literature and creative writing at the University of Florida, where he had Merrill Joan Gerber, Madison Jones and Harry Crews as students.

Though Lytle retired from the University of the South in 1973, he never fully retired from either writing or teaching. In the last years of his life, he had what he called the "great pleasure" of seeing most of his earlier books come back into print. Several university presses published collections of his stories and essays.

== Personal life and death ==
Lytle was married to the former Edna Barker for 25 years; she died in 1963. He was the owner of Cornsilk, a historic house in Cross Plains, Tennessee, in the 1940s. He died on December 13, 1995, in Monteagle, Tennessee.

Lytle Street in Murfreesboro, Tennessee is named after his ancestor William Lytle, of Hillsboro, North Carolina, who served in the Sixth, First, and Fourth regiments of the North Carolina Line during the American Revolutionary War. He moved to Tennessee in 1790.

== Works ==
- Bedford Forrest and His Critter Company (1931)
- The Long Night (1936)
- At the Moon's Inn (1941)
- A Name for Evil (1947)
- The Velvet Horn (1957)
- A Novel, a Novella, and Four Stories (1958)
- The Hero with the Private Parts: Essays (1966)
- Craft and Vision: The Best Fiction from the Sewanee Review (1971) (edited)
- A Wake for the Living: A Family Chronicle (1975)
- The Lytle-Tate Letters: The Correspondence of Andrew Lytle and Allen Tate (1987) (edited by Thomas Daniel Young and Elizabeth Sarcone)
- Southerners and Europeans: Essays in a Time of Disorder (1988)
- From Eden to Babylon: The Social and Political Essays of Andrew Nelson Lytle (1990) (edited by M. E. Bradford)
- Kristin: A Reading (1992)
