= Wessyngton (Cedar Hill, Tennessee) =

Historic house in Tennessee, United States

- U.S. National Register of Historic Places
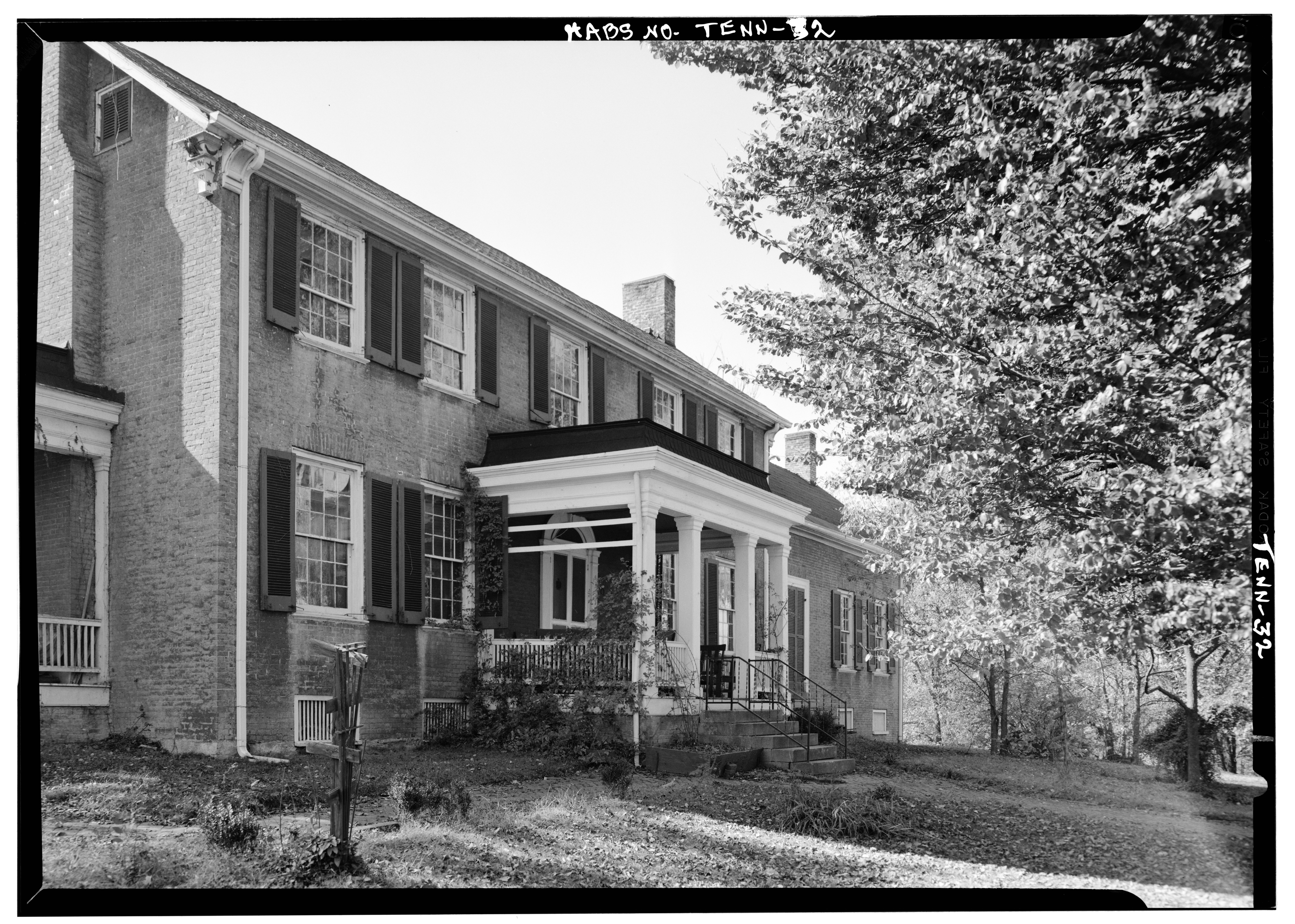

- Location within Tennessee
- Nearest city: Cedar Hill, Tennessee
- Coordinates: 36°30′05″N 87°00′14″W
- Area: 15,000 acres (6,100 ha)
- Built: 1815
- Architectural style: Federal
- NRHP reference No.: 71000830
- Added to NRHP: May 6, 1971

Wessyngton is a historic mansion on a former tobacco plantation near Cedar Hill, Tennessee, U.S. It is listed on the National Register of Historic Places.

== History ==
The house was built in 1815 for Joseph Washington, his wife Mary née Cheatham, and their infant son George Augustine Washington (1815-1892). Washington, who, was the second cousin of George Washington, President of the United States developed it as a tobacco plantation, and his son continued to operate it for that commodity crop.

George served in the Tennessee General Assembly from 1873 to 1875. His son Joseph E. Washington followed him into politics, serving in the United States House of Representatives from 1887 to 1897. In 1860 George owned 274 slaves, who cultivated thousands of acres of land. After the war and emancipation, most of the freedmen stayed on the plantation, with some working as domestic servants for the family, and most as sharecroppers. In the 1890s, Joseph Washington and his wife commissioned portraits of some of their servants from noted artist Maria Howard Weeden of Huntsville, Alabama.

After Joseph's death, his widow Mary Bolling Kemp Washington owned the plantation from 1915 to 1938. After her death, it passed to their three children.

The Washingtons grew tobacco on the plantation, which was known as the largest tobacco plantation in the United States. In 1976, it was recognized as a Century Farm.

== Architectural significance ==
The house was designed in the Federal architectural style. It has been listed on the National Register of Historic Places since May 6, 1971.
