= Glen Raven (Cedar Hill, Tennessee) =

Historic house in Tennessee, United States

- U.S. National Register of Historic Places
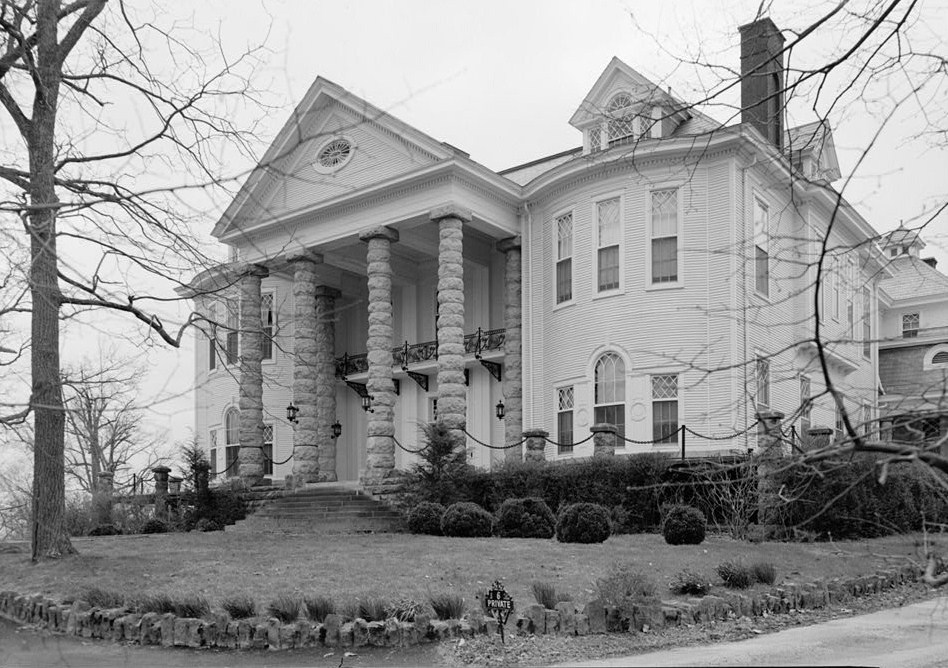

- Location within Tennessee Location within the United States
- Nearest city: Cedar Hill, Tennessee
- Area: 550 acres (220 ha)
- Built: 1902
- Architectural style: Late Victorian, Victorian
- NRHP reference No.: 73001816
- Added to NRHP: October 2, 1973

Glen Raven is a historic mansion near Cedar Hill, Tennessee, USA. It was built from 1897 to 1902 by Felix Grundy Ewing and Jane Washington. It has been listed on the National Register of Historic Places since October 2, 1973.
