= Ridgetop, Tennessee =

Ridgetop
- City
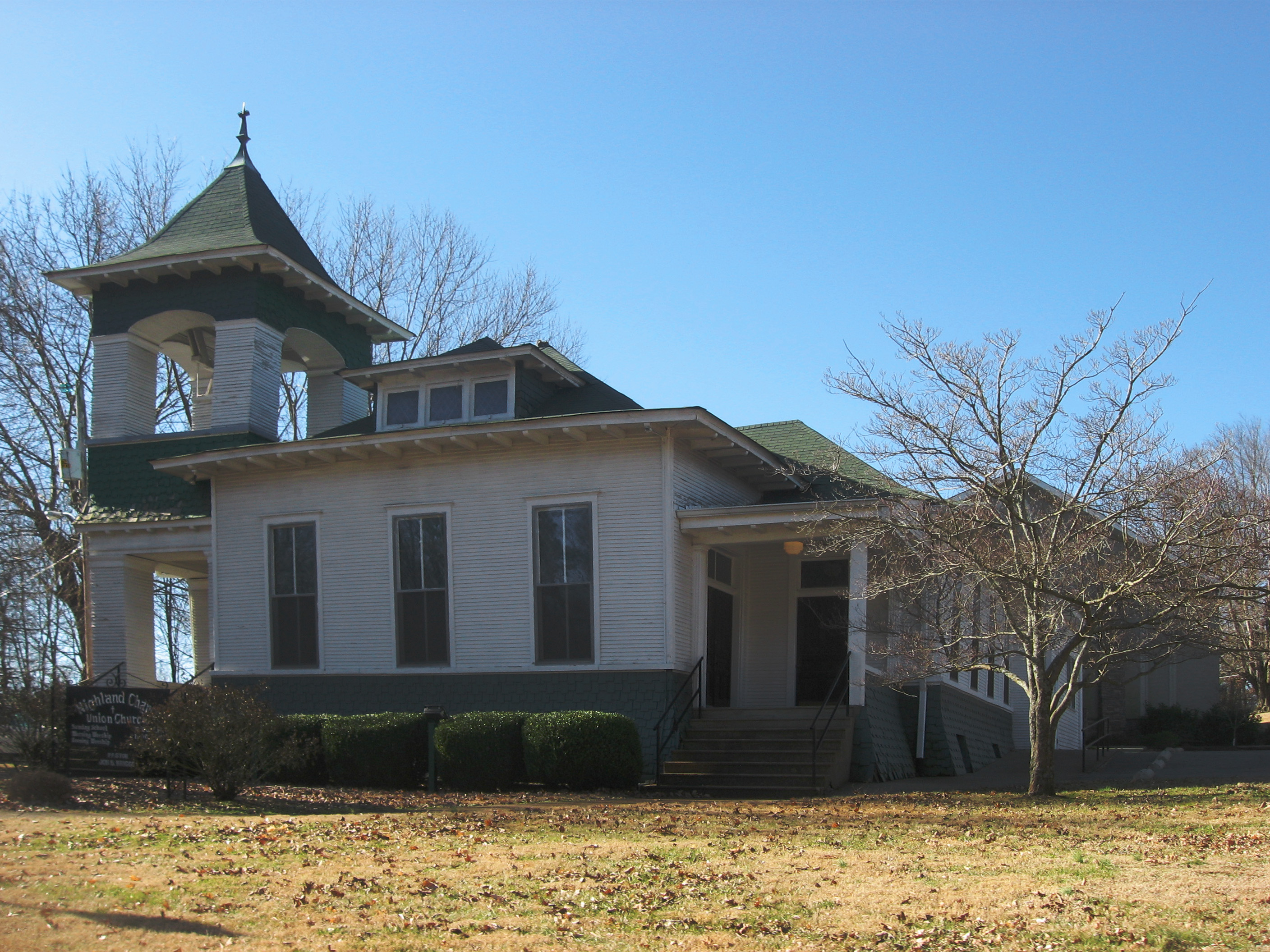
- Highland Chapel Union Church, a historic site in the city

- Location of Ridgetop in Robertson County, Tennessee.

- Location within the state of Tennessee
- Coordinates: 36°23′42″N 86°46′46″W
- Country: United States
- State: Tennessee
- Counties: Robertson, Davidson

Government
  - Mayor: Tony Reasoner

Area
  - Total: 3.04 sq mi (7.87 km^{2})
  - Land: 3.03 sq mi (7.84 km^{2})
  - Water: 0.012 sq mi (0.03 km^{2})
- Elevation: 896 ft (273 m)

Population (2020)
  - Total: 2,155
  - Density: 712.3/sq mi (275.01/km^{2})
- Time zone: UTC-6 (Central (CST))
  - Summer (DST): UTC-5 (CDT)
- ZIP code: 37152
- Area code(s): 615, 629
- FIPS code: 47-63140
- GNIS feature ID: 1299405
- Website: Official website

Ridgetop is a city in Davidson and Robertson counties in the U.S. state of Tennessee. The population was 2,155 at the 2020 census.

== Demographics ==
Historical population
Census	Pop.	Note	%±
1910	43		—
1920	126		193.0%
1930	196		55.6%
1940	351		79.1%
1950	354		0.9%
1960	372		5.1%
1970	858		130.6%
1980	1,225		42.8%
1990	1,132		−7.6%
2000	1,083		−4.3%
2010	1,874		73.0%
2020	2,155		15.0%

=== 2020 census ===
As of the 2020 census, Ridgetop had a population of 2,155. The median age was 44.0 years; 19.9% of residents were under the age of 18 and 20.9% of residents were 65 years of age or older. For every 100 females there were 100.3 males, and for every 100 females age 18 and over there were 95.6 males age 18 and over.

95.3% of residents lived in urban areas, while 4.7% lived in rural areas.

There were 857 households in Ridgetop, of which 31.3% had children under the age of 18 living in them. Of all households, 58.5% were married-couple households, 16.2% were households with a male householder and no spouse or partner present, and 21.6% were households with a female householder and no spouse or partner present. About 24.7% of all households were made up of individuals, 12.5% had someone living alone who was 65 years of age or older, and 613 families resided in the city.

There were 898 housing units, of which 4.6% were vacant. The homeowner vacancy rate was 1.3% and the rental vacancy rate was 1.6%.

Racial composition as of the 2020 census
Race	Number	Percent
White	1,959	90.9%
Black or African American	32	1.5%
American Indian and Alaska Native	7	0.3%
Asian	16	0.7%
Native Hawaiian and Other Pacific Islander	2	0.1%
Some other race	32	1.5%
Two or more races	107	5.0%
Hispanic or Latino (of any race)	66	3.1%

=== 2000 census ===
As of the census of 2000, there was a population of 1,083, with 385 households and 314 families residing in the city. The population density was 678.3 inhabitants per square mile (261.9/km^{2}). There were 399 housing units at an average density of 249.9 per square mile (96.5/km^{2}). The racial makeup of the city was 96.12% White, 1.48% African American, 0.09% Native American, 0.55% Asian, 0.18% from other races, and 1.57% from two or more races. Hispanic or Latino of any race were 1.02% of the population.

There were 385 households, out of which 32.7% had children under the age of 18 living with them, 67.5% were married couples living together, 9.6% had a female householder with no husband present, and 18.4% were non-families. 16.1% of all households were made up of individuals, and 7.3% had someone living alone who was 65 years of age or older. The average household size was 2.71 and the average family size was 3.00.

In the city, the population was spread out, with 23.4% under the age of 18, 6.8% from 18 to 24, 26.6% from 25 to 44, 28.3% from 45 to 64, and 14.9% who were 65 years of age or older. The median age was 41 years. For every 100 females, there were 99.4 males. For every 100 females age 18 and over, there were 96.2 males.

The median income for a household in the city was $52,381, and the median income for a family was $57,589. Males had a median income of $40,813 versus $26,250 for females. The per capita income for the city was $19,610. About 4.3% of families and 4.5% of the population were below the poverty line, including 4.2% of those under age 18 and 15.5% of those age 65 or over.

== Filming ==
Scenes for Hannah Montana: The Movie were filmed at the special events facility "Smiley Hollow". The movie was released April 10, 2009.

== Notable residents ==
- Grandpa Jones - American banjo player and "old time" country and gospel music singer and member of the Grand Ole Opry
- David "Stringbean" Akeman - American country music banjo player and comedy musician best known for his role on the hit television show, Hee Haw, and as a member of the Grand Ole Opry. He and his wife were neighbors of Grandpa Jones' and were both murdered at their home in 1973.
