= Youngville, Tennessee =

Youngville
- Unincorporated community
- Location within Tennessee Location within the United States
- Coordinates: 36°35′07″N 86°49′33″W
- Country: United States
- State: Tennessee
- County: Robertson
- Time zone: UTC-6 (Central (CST))
  - Summer (DST): UTC-5 (CDT)

Youngville is an unincorporated community in Robertson County, Tennessee, in the United States and is part of the Nashville–Davidson–Murfreesboro–Franklin Metropolitan Statistical Area.

The community is primarily rural, with surrounding agricultural land and low-density residential development.
