= Walton–Wiggins Farm =

Historic house in Tennessee, United States

- U.S. National Register of Historic Places
- U.S. Historic district
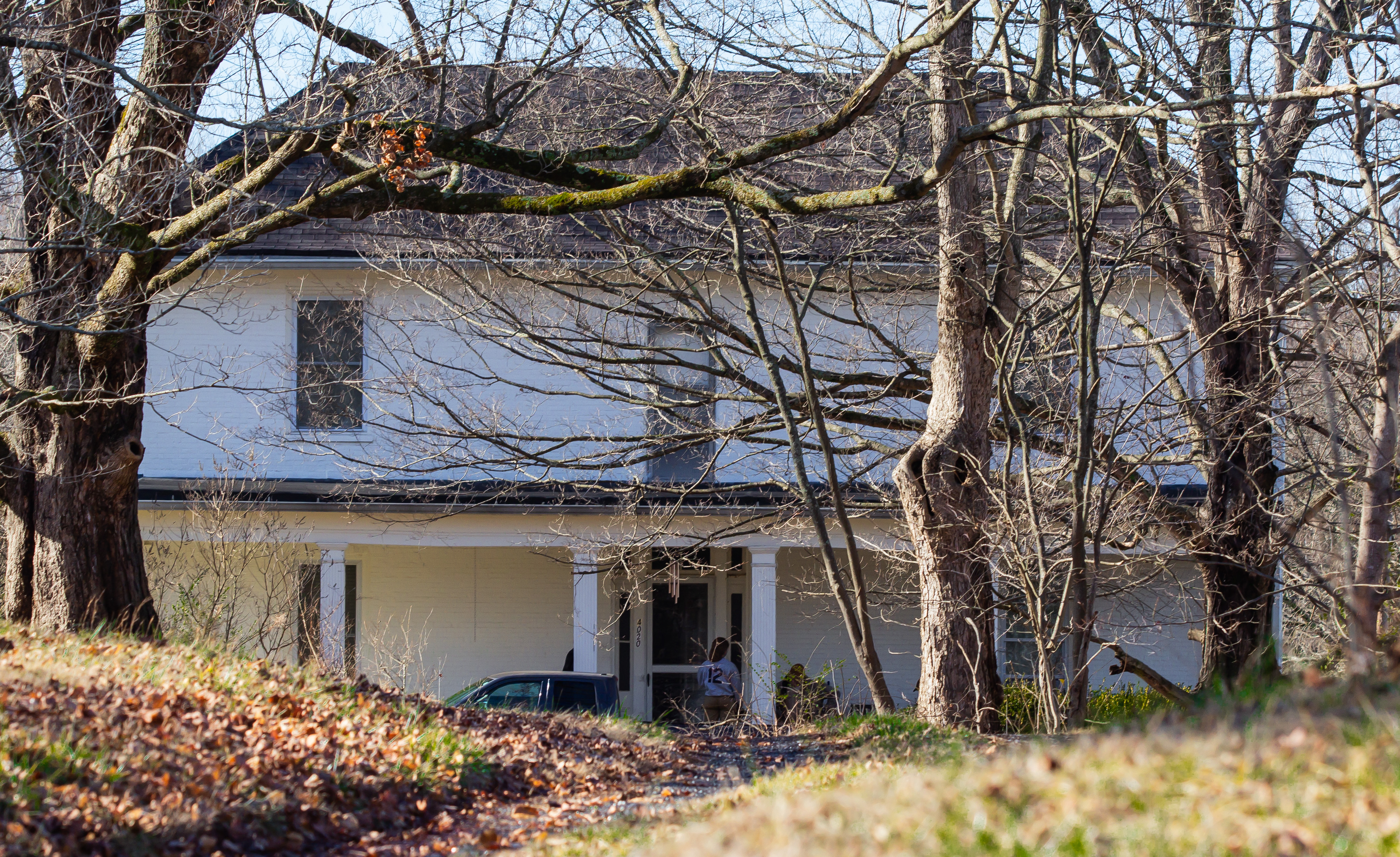
- Walton-Wiggins Farm

- Location within Tennessee
- Nearest city: Springfield, Tennessee
- Coordinates: 36°31′12″N 86°44′05″W
- Area: 5.2 acres (2.1 ha)
- Built: 1855
- Architectural style: Colonial Revival
- MPS: Historic Family Farms in Middle Tennessee MPS
- NRHP reference No.: 97000883
- Added to NRHP: August 8, 1997

The Walton–Wiggins Farm is a historic farmhouse near Springfield, Tennessee, U.S..

The house was built circa 1855 for Dr. Lycurgus B. Walton, a physician and slaveholder. His son, Martin Atkinson Walton, graduated from the Vanderbilt University School of Medicine and took over his father's medical practice in the house. He lived there with his wife, Elizabeth Henry Woodard, and their six children. One of his daughter, Eva, married John Bynum Wiggins, and the farm was subsequently inherited by their descendants. By the 1980s, the owner was John Bynum Wiggins III, and the farm was used for "livestock cattle, soybeans, tobacco, corn and wheat."

The house was designed in the Colonial Revival architectural style, with Greek Revival features. It has been listed on the National Register of Historic Places since August 8, 1997.
