= Dr. Martin Walton House =

Historic house museum in Tennessee, United States

- U.S. National Register of Historic Places
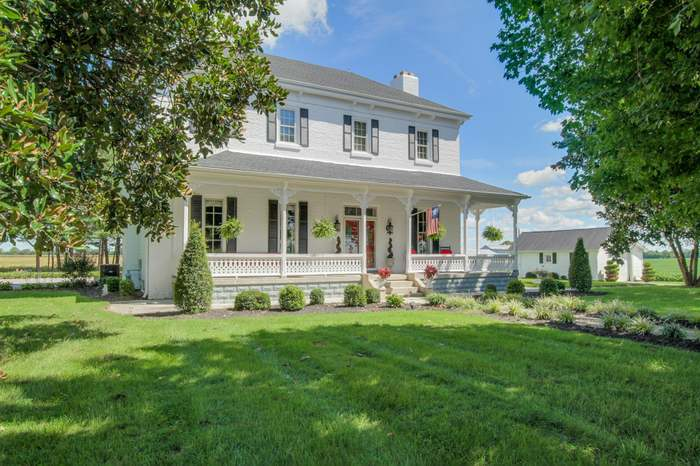

- Location within Tennessee Location within the United States
- Location: 6360 State Route 25, E., near Springfield, Tennessee
- Coordinates: 36°33′14″N 86°47′09″W
- Area: 1 acre (0.40 ha)
- Built: 1809
- Architectural style: Italianate
- NRHP reference No.: 96001318
- Added to NRHP: November 20, 1996

The Dr. Martin Walton House is a historic house and museum near Springfield, Tennessee, U.S..

== History ==
The house was built in 1809 for Dr. Martin Walton, a veteran of the American Revolutionary War. The house was built on land bought by Dr. Walton in 1804. Dr. Walton also received an adjoining land grant for his service in 1832. He lived there with his five children after moving from Louisa County, Virginia along with other family members. His wife, Elizabeth, had died in Virginia in 1800, at or near the birth of their youngest child, and never got to see the house. Walton later remarried Chloe Walton and they had no recorded children. Walton was a physician, Baptist minister, and large landowner who grew corn and cotton; he also made whiskey. Chloe Walton died in 1840 and Martin Walton died in 1844 and is buried on the property. Dr. Walton died intestate and his son David was in charge of the estate. His children sold the house to William Pope in early 1845. David was allegedly murdered by a slave months later.

William Pope died shortly after the purchase. The home then went to his daughter, Priscilla Pope, and her husband William Gorham. They are also buried on the property. The house was purchased by William Cook, a veteran of the Confederate States Army during the American Civil War, and his wife Susan, in 1866. Susan was the daughter of Priscilla and William Gorham. It was redesigned in the Italianate architectural style in 1870. The home stayed in the same blood family from 1845 until 2018 when it was sold. It was listed on the National Register of Historic Places in 1996.

The home was purchased in 2023 by a family related to Martin Walton's brother, Meredith Walton, and his wife, Sarah Yates. They turned the home into a historic home museum dedicated to the families.
