= Cedar Hill, Tennessee =

- City
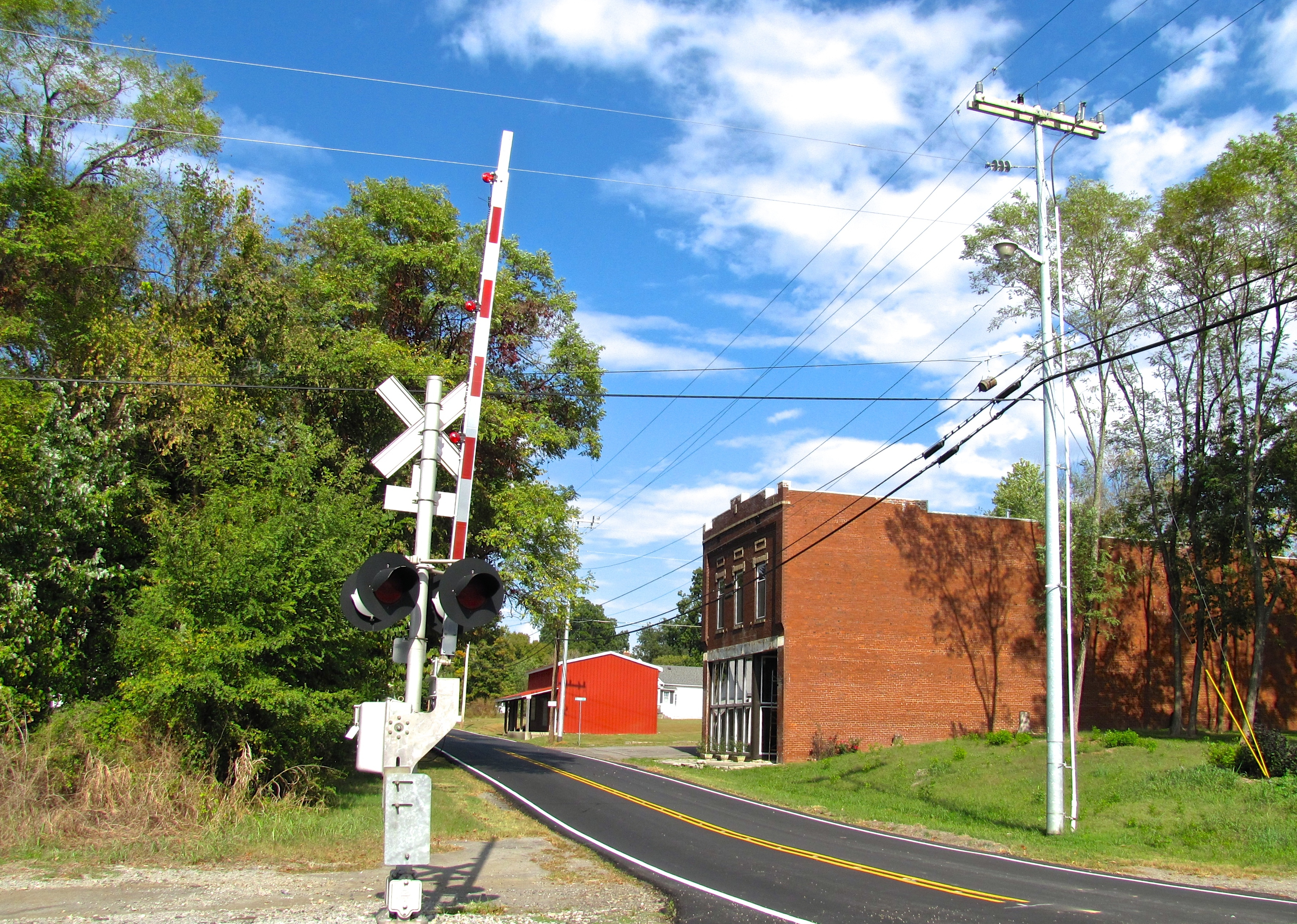
- Main Street crossing the railroad tracks in Cedar Hill

- Location of Cedar Hill in Robertson County, Tennessee.

- Location within Tennessee Location within the United States
- Coordinates: 36°32′58″N 87°00′02″W
- Country: United States
- State: Tennessee
- County: Robertson

Government
  - Mayor: John Edwards
  - Vice Mayor: Marquita Pettus
  - Commissioner: Frank Kirby

Area
  - Total: 0.62 sq mi (1.61 km^{2})
  - Land: 0.62 sq mi (1.61 km^{2})
  - Water: 0 sq mi (0.00 km^{2})
- Elevation: 679 ft (207 m)

Population (2020)
  - Total: 301
  - Density: 483/sq mi (186.5/km^{2})
- Time zone: UTC-6 (Central (CST))
  - Summer (DST): UTC-5 (CDT)
- ZIP code: 37032
- Area code(s): 615, 629
- FIPS code: 47-11980
- GNIS feature ID: 1305776
- Website: https://www.cityofcedarhill.org/

Cedar Hill is a city in Robertson County, Tennessee, United States. As of the 2020 census, the population was 301.

== History ==
Jo Byrns, who became Speaker of the House of Representatives, was born in Cedar Hill on July 28, 1869. The local elementary school and high school are named for him.

In the 1940s and 1950s Cedar Hill had a population of about 700, with around 10 stores. The economy was based on services to surrounding farmers; the main crop in the area was tobacco.

By the 1960s, crops were more diversified and more farmers had cars, enabling them to travel to the county seat of Springfield, about nine miles away. Also at about this time, the construction of the Interstate Highway System, namely Interstate 24 and Interstate 65, removed much of Cedar Hill's through traffic. These factors led to a steady decline in population and development, but the area has begun to move forward in a positive direction through community building and revitalization efforts.

In 2006, Jo Byrns Elementary School opened near Cedar Hill, serving grade Pre-K to 5.

== Geography ==
Cedar Hill is located along U.S. Route 41 in northwestern Robertson County. Springfield lies to the southeast, and Adams lies to the northwest.

The Tennessee Wildlife Resource Agency owns the Cedar Hill Swamp WMA site which features early- to late-successional hardwood forest dominated by pin oak and sweetgum that dominate the 200 acres found at Cedar Hill Swamp WMA. A few acres of overgrown fields are found near the entrance.

The only remaining swampland is on private property adjacent to the WMA on the opposite side of the CSX railroad tracks.

According to the United States Census Bureau, the city has a total area of 0.7 square miles (1.8 km^{2}), all land.

== Demographics ==
Historical population
Census	Pop.	Note	%±
1880	200		—
1970	355		—
1980	420		18.3%
1990	347		−17.4%
2000	298		−14.1%
2010	314		5.4%
2020	301		−4.1%

=== 2020 census ===
As of the 2020 census, Cedar Hill had a population of 301, 110 households, and 78 families residing in the city. The median age was 37.1 years; 26.6% of residents were under the age of 18 and 13.3% of residents were 65 years of age or older. For every 100 females there were 102.0 males, and for every 100 females age 18 and over there were 102.8 males age 18 and over. Of these households, 36.4% had children under the age of 18 living in them; 40.9% were married-couple households, 19.1% were households with a male householder and no spouse or partner present, and 27.3% were households with a female householder and no spouse or partner present. About 23.6% of all households were made up of individuals and 11.9% had someone living alone who was 65 years of age or older. There were 123 housing units, of which 10.6% were vacant. The homeowner vacancy rate was 7.1% and the rental vacancy rate was 0.0%. 0.0% of residents lived in urban areas, while 100.0% lived in rural areas.

Racial composition as of the 2020 census
Race	Number	Percent
White	239	79.4%
Black or African American	22	7.3%
American Indian and Alaska Native	2	0.7%
Asian	2	0.7%
Native Hawaiian and Other Pacific Islander	0	0.0%
Some other race	16	5.3%
Two or more races	20	6.6%
Hispanic or Latino (of any race)	25	8.3%

=== 2000 census ===
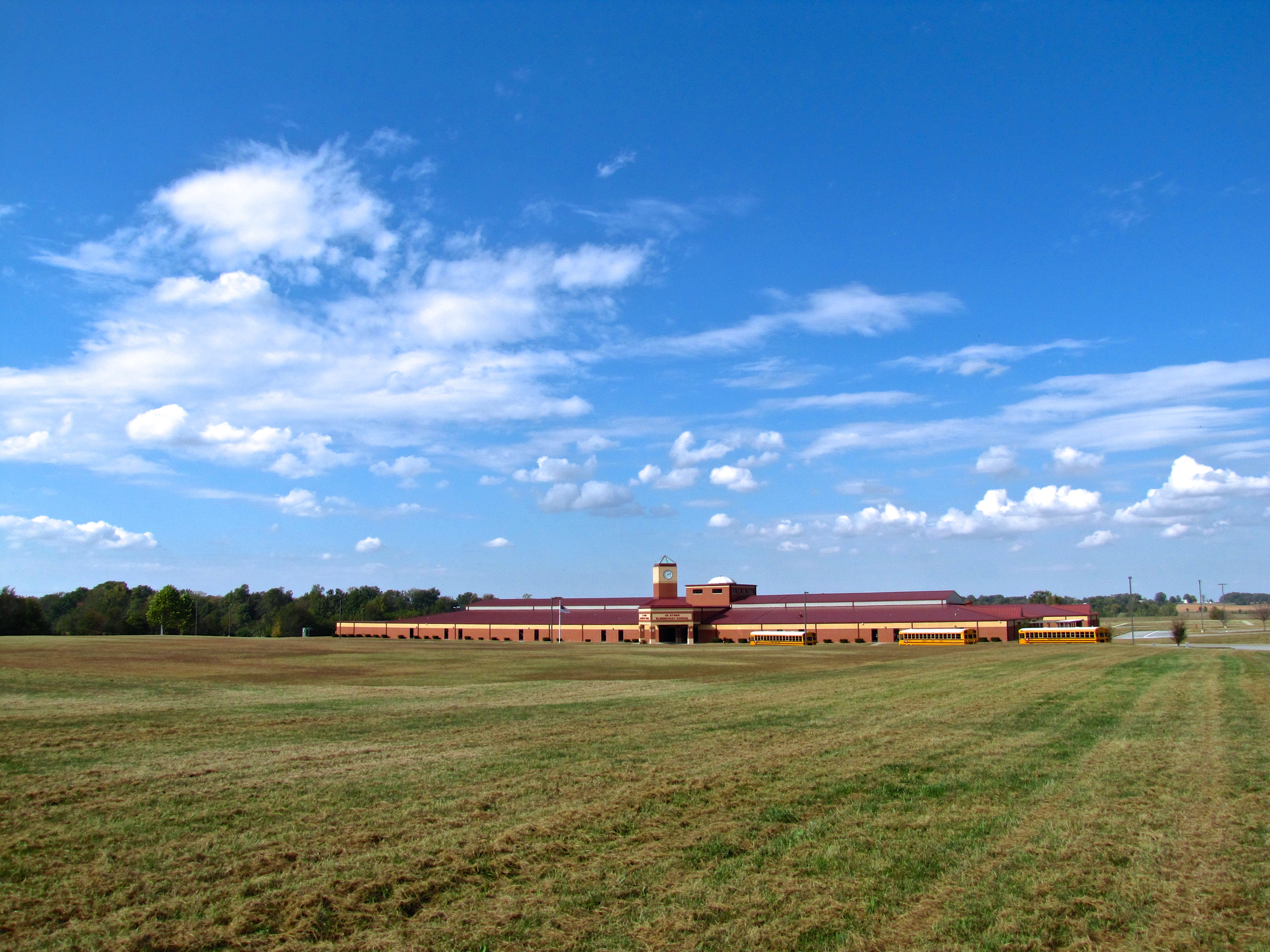
Jo Byrns Elementary School

As of the census of 2000, there was a population of 298, with 98 households and 79 families residing in the city. The population density was 442.9 inhabitants per square mile (171.0/km^{2}). There were 111 housing units at an average density of 165.0 units per square mile (63.7 units/km^{2}). The racial makeup of the city was 77.18% White, 21.48% African American, 0.34% Native American, 0.67% from other races, and 0.34% from two or more races. Hispanic or Latino of any race were 1.01% of the population.

There were 98 households, out of which 37.8% had children under the age of 18 living with them, 58.2% were married couples living together, 19.4% had a female householder with no husband present, and 18.4% were non-families. 16.3% of all households were made up of individuals, and 10.2% had someone living alone who was 65 years of age or older. The average household size was 3.04 and the average family size was 3.41.

In the city, the population was spread out, with 29.9% under the age of 18, 8.1% from 18 to 24, 28.9% from 25 to 44, 23.5% from 45 to 64, and 9.7% who were 65 years of age or older. The median age was 34 years. For every 100 females, there were 94.8 males. For every 100 females age 18 and over, there were 90.0 males.

The median income for a household in the city was $34,688, and the median income for a family was $40,000. Males had a median income of $30,000 versus $20,000 for females. The per capita income for the city was $12,209. About 10.5% of families and 14.6% of the population were below the poverty line, including 27.6% of those under the age of eighteen and 27.8% of those 65 or over.
