= Joshua Evans =

Joshua Evans is the name of:

- Joshua Evans (Quaker minister) (1731–1798), Quaker minister from New Jersey
- Joshua Evans Jr. (1777–1846), United States Congressman from Pennsylvania
- Joshua Evans (Tennessee politician) (born 1983), member of the Tennessee House of Representatives
- Josh Ryan Evans (1982–2002), American actor
- Josh Evans (film producer) (born 1971), American filmmaker, screenwriter, author and actor
- Josh Evans (defensive lineman) (1972–2021), American football player
- Josh Evans (defensive back) (born 1991), American football player
- Josh Evans, fictitious persona used to harass Megan Meier, see Suicide of Megan Meier
