= Milldale =

Milldale may refer to:

- Milldale (Southington), Connecticut, USA
- Milldale, Florida, a neighborhood of Jacksonville, Florida
- Milldale, Tennessee
- Milldale, Virginia, USA
- Milldale, Ontario, Canada
- Milldale (Peak District), close to the Derbyshire/Staffordshire boundary, England
- Milldale, New Zealand a suburb of Auckland, New Zealand
- Milldale Estate, an Australian vineyard
