= Rainbow Fraternity =

American college club (1849–1886)

- W.W.W.
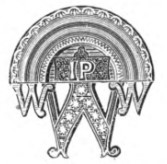
- Rainbow Fraternity badge for Vanderbilt University chapter, circa 1898
- Founded: 1848; 178 years ago University of Mississippi
- Type: Social
- Affiliation: Independent
- Status: Merged
- Merge date: 1886
- Successor: Delta Tau Delta
- Scope: Regional (Southern United States)
- Colors: Red; Orange; Yellow; Green; Cyan; Blue; Violet
- Symbol: Rainbow
- Patron Greek deity: Iris
- Chapters: 13
- Nickname: W.W.W. Society
- Headquarters: United States

Rainbow Fraternity, also known as the Mystic Sons of Iris and the W.W.W. Society, was an American collegiate social fraternity founded at the University of Mississippi in 1848. Organized by seven students who had transferred from La Grange College in northern Alabama, it developed as a regional fraternity at colleges in the Southern United States. Its symbolism centered on the goddess Iris, the personification of the rainbow in Greek mythology, and on the number seven. The Rainbow Fraternity consolidated with Delta Tau Delta in 1886.

== History ==
=== Founding and antebellum period ===
The Rainbow Fraternity was founded at the University of Mississippi toward the end of 1848. Its founders were seven students who had left LaGrange College in Alabama: John Baylis Earle, John Bannister Herring, James Hamilton Mayson, Robert Muldrow, Joshua Long Halbert, Marlborough Pegues, and Drew Williamson Bynum.

The organization was formally known as the Mystic Sons of Iris, although it became commonly known as the Rainbow Fraternity and the W.W.W. Society. Its name and symbolism referred to Iris, the ancient Greek personification of the rainbow.

According to an 1892 history compiled by C. Robert Churchill from surviving fraternity materials and correspondence with former members, the founders originally intended the fraternity to remain exclusively Southern. Membership was restricted to men from Southern states who supported the contemporary doctrines of states' rights, secession, and slavery, while men from free states and those holding abolitionist views were excluded. Churchill stated that these restrictions disappeared following the Civil War.

Originally, the fraternity was limited to seven active chapters, with each chapter restricted to seven active members at any given time, in reference to its seven founders. The small membership limit contributed to unusually small antebellum chapters: there were only 24 initiates at the University of Mississippi between 1848 and the suspension of fraternity activity in 1861. A later examination of fraternity records by Delta Tau Delta historian F. Darrell Moore found that Rainbow never actually maintained seven chapters simultaneously before the 1880s and questioned some of the traditions that had developed around the number seven.

Rainbow’s University of Mississippi chapter was known as S.A. In 1858, the fraternity established a second chapter, A., at La Grange College through the efforts of University of Mississippi alumnus and Rainbow member John H. McKie. Both chapters suspended operations during the Civil War. While its University of Mississippi chapter was reorganized after the war, the campus of La Grange College was destroyed during the war, and neither the college nor its Rainbow chapter ever reopened.

=== Expansion and consolidation with Delta Tau Delta ===
Map showing the growth of Rainbow Fraternity

Rainbow remained an exclusively Southern fraternity during the postwar period. Beginning in the early 1870s, the fraternity began its second and final period of expansion, establishing chapters at institutions including Furman University, Erskine College, Wofford College, Stewart College, Chamberlain-Hunt Academy, Vanderbilt University, Southwestern University, the University of Texas, Emory & Henry College, and the University of Tennessee.

By the early 1880s, Rainbow leaders pivoted from the fraternity's original regional-based membership and chapter location restrictions, and sought affiliations outside the South. The fraternity held preliminary discussions with at least three fraternities, Alpha Delta Phi, Kappa Sigma, and Sigma Alpha Epsilon, on the possibility of a merger, but no agreements could be reached.

At the same time, the Delta Tau Delta fraternity was seeking stronger representation at Southern institutions. Serious conversations toward a merger of Rainbow and Delta Tau Delta began in the early 1880s, and representatives of both organizations met in Nashville in 1884. Under the final consolidation agreement, Rainbow accepted the name, badge, constitution, laws, and ritual of Delta Tau Delta. In exchange, Delta Tau Delta designated its Southern division the "Rainbow Division", located its governing grand chapter at Vanderbilt University, guaranteed the former Rainbow chapters alumni representation on its Executive Council, and agreed to rename its fraternity journal.

The consolidation was completed in 1886. Rainbow's University of Mississippi chapter became Delta Tau Delta's Pi chapter, and its Vanderbilt chapter became the Lambda chapter. Other Rainbow chapters, however, did not enter Delta Tau Delta: the University of Texas and Southwestern University groups affiliated with Phi Delta Theta, while the remaining active chapters (Chamberlain-Hunt Academy, Emory & Henry College, and the University of Tennessee) were deemed undesirable by Delta Tau Delta and had their charters withdrawn by Rainbow during the consolidation process.

In 1889, a former Rainbow member briefly reestablished a chapter at Wofford College, apparently without knowing that the national organization had consolidated with Delta Tau Delta. The chapter ceased operations after learning of the consolidation.

== Symbols ==
Rainbow's symbolism was dominated by the rainbow and by the number seven. Its colors were the seven colors of the rainbow, and each of the fraternity's seven officers was associated with a different color. Churchill's 1892 account states that the original constitution contained seven articles, each initially divided into seven sections, while the initiation ceremonies consisted of seven forms or degrees.

The fraternity's original badge was modeled on the Roman fasces. It consisted of a half-cylinder formed by seven rods held together by three double bands and surmounted by an axe head. The bands were colored according to one of the seven prismatic colors, with the color indicating the office or rank of the wearer. Alumnus member J. K. P. Newton recalled that a chapter initially possessed only seven badges, which were worn by its officers and passed to their successors. He described the bundled rods as representing the strength produced by unity.

The badge was redesigned around January 1874. The later design consisted of a broad semicircular arch representing a rainbow, set above three stylized, overlapping capital Ws. The central W was considerably larger than the two flanking letters and was set with seven small gemstones. The chapter-identifying letters appeared in the field beneath the center of the arch and above the large W. Surviving examples show the rainbow as a dark enameled band bordered by narrow decorative bands, while period illustrations depict the arch with several concentric bands.

The fraternity seal reproduced the later badge within two concentric circles. The words "Enios Iridos" appeared between the circles at the top, while the name of the member's college or university appeared below.

Chapter designations were assigned by the mother chapter at the University of Mississippi and were engraved on members' badges. According to Churchill, two chapters in the same state could not simultaneously use the same designation.

== Chapters ==
Following is a list of Rainbow Fraternity's chapters. Inactive chapters and institutions are indicated in italic.

Chapter	Charter date and range	Institution	Location	Status	Ref.
S.A.	1848–1861, 1867–1886	University of Mississippi	Oxford, Mississippi	Merged (ΔΤΔ)	(Note: The chapter closed in 1861 due to the Civil War. Sources differ on the date of the chapter's postwar revival. Baird's 1879 "American College Fraternities" gives 1865, while F. Darrell Moore's 1963 reconstruction of Rainbow's history gives 1867. It became the Pi chapter of Delta Tau Delta with the national merger of the two fraternities in 1886.)
A. (First)	1858–1861	La Grange College	Present-day Colbert County, Alabama	Inactive	(Note: Chapter went defunct when the college closed in 1861 because of the Civil War.)
L.K.S.	1871–1874	Furman University	Greenville, South Carolina	Inactive	(Note: Charter was withdrawn by fraternity.)
L.T.	May 15, 1872 – 1880; 1881–1884	Erskine College	Due West, South Carolina	Inactive	(Note: Charter was withdrawn in 1880 but was reissued shortly afterwards.)
I.P. (First)	November 21, 1873 – 1874	Stewart College	Clarksville, Tennessee	Inactive	
L.S. (First)	1874–1875, 1889–1890 ?	Wofford College	Spartanburg, South Carolina	Inactive	(Note: Charter was withdrawn by the fraternity in 1875. Alumni re-established the chapter, but it was closed after they realized the national fraternity had merged with Delta Tau Delta.)
D.V. (First)	1874–1874	Neophogen College	Cross Plains, Tennessee	Inactive	
A. (Second)	1880–1886	Chamberlain-Hunt Academy	Port Gibson, Mississippi	Inactive	(Note: This chapter was the only one located in a preparatory academy instead of a college or university. Its charter was withdrawn at the time of the national fraternity's merger with Delta Tau Delta in 1886.)
I.P. (Second)	1881–1886	Vanderbilt University	Nashville, Tennessee	Merged (ΔΤΔ)	(Note: This became the executive chapter in 1883. In 1886, it became the Lambda chapter of Delta Tau Delta with the national merger of the two fraternities.)
D.V. (Second) / L.S. (Second)	1882–1886	Southwestern University	Georgetown, Texas	Withdrew (ΦΔΘ)	(Note: Instead of joining its national fraternity's merger with Delta Tau Delta, this chapter became the Texas Gamma chapter of Phi Delta Theta.)
D.V. (Third)	1883–1886	University of Texas	Austin, Texas	Withdrew (ΦΔΘ)	(Note: Instead of joining its national fraternity's merger with Delta Tau Delta, this chapter withdrew and merged with the Texas Beta chapter of Phi Delta Theta.)
A. (Third)	1884–1886	Emory & Henry College	Emory, Virginia	Inactive	(Note: The chapter's charter was withdrawn at the time of the national fraternity's merger with Delta Tau Delta in 1886. Most of its members joined the existing Virginia Pi chapter of Sigma Alpha Epsilon.)
D.V. (Fourth)	1884–1886	University of Tennessee	Knoxville, Tennessee	Inactive	

== Legacy ==
The consolidation left several visible traces of the older Rainbow fraternity within Delta Tau Delta. Under the final Articles of Consolidation, its Southern division was renamed the "Rainbow Division", the former Rainbow chapters were guaranteed alumni representation on the Executive Council, and Delta Tau Delta's existing journal, The Crescent, was renamed The Rainbow. The first issue under the new title appeared in 1886.

Delta Tau Delta later developed a pre-initiation ceremony called the Rite of Iris. Although the ceremony has sometimes been described as a surviving Rainbow ritual, contemporary Delta Tau Delta records show that editor and ritualist Stuart Maclean presented the Rite of Iris at the fraternity's 1929 Golden Karnea as a proposed new ceremony for pledges, initially intended for experimental use by chapters. A 1934 fraternity memorial subsequently identified Maclean as the author of the Rite of Iris.
