= List of Phi Delta Theta chapters =

Phi Delta Theta is an international college fraternity founded in 1848. Chapter designation is determined by the order in which each chapter was awarded its charter in the state or province in which it is located (i.e., the first chapter established in a state/province is designated "Alpha", the second is "Beta", the third "Gamma", and so on). Exceptions to this rule have occurred when two universities, each with their own chapter, merge, causing the chapters to merge. This results in the hyphenated name of the two chapters that make up the new one (see Illinois Delta-Zeta).

== Provinces ==
Phi Delta Theta groups chapters together in a province to assist with the administration of its many chapters. Each province has a Greek letter as its name.

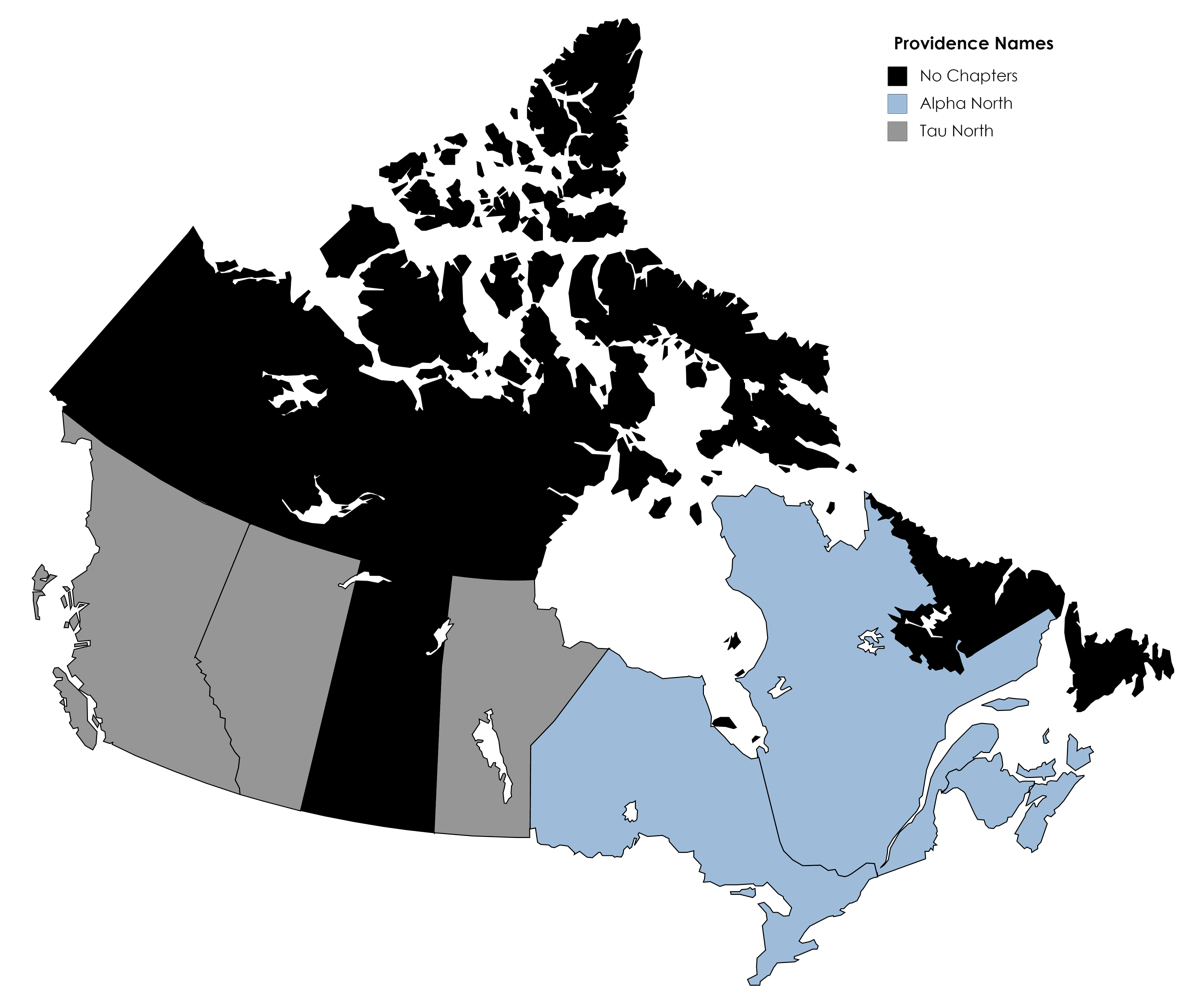
Phi Delta Theta Administrative Provinces in Canada

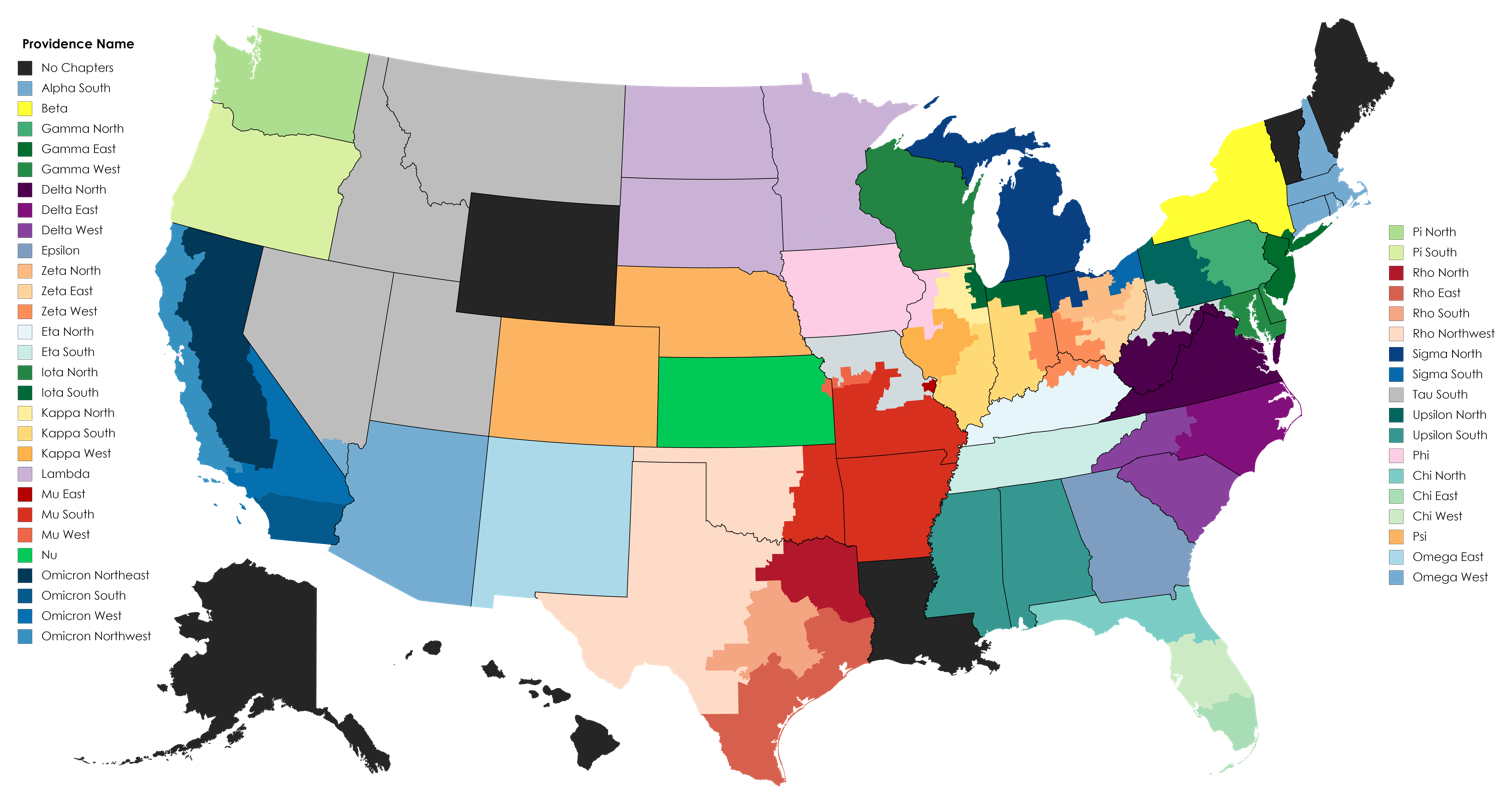
Phi Delta Theta Administrative Provinces in United States

| Province | Abbreviation | Areas served |
|---|---|---|
| Alpha North | Α N | Ontario, Quebec, Nova Scotia |
| Alpha South | Α S | Maine, New Hampshire, Vermont, Massachusetts, Connecticut |
| Beta | Β | New York |
| Gamma North | Γ N | East Pennsylvania |
| Gamma East | Γ E | New Jersey |
| Gamma West | Γ W | Delaware, Maryland |
| Delta North | Δ N | Virginia, West Virginia, District of Columbia |
| Delta East | Δ E | East North Carolina |
| Delta West | Δ W | West North Carolina, South Carolina |
| Epsilon | Ε | Georgia |
| Zeta North | Z N | North-Central Ohio |
| Zeta East | Ζ E | South-Central Ohio |
| Zeta West | Ζ W | Southwest Ohio |
| Eta North | Η N | Kentucky |
| Eta South | Η S | Tennessee |
| Theta | Θ | Louisiana, Mississippi, Alabama |
| Iota North | Ι N | Wisconsin |
| Iota South | Ι S | North Indiana, North Illinois |
| Kappa North | Κ N | Central Indiana |
| Kappa South | Κ S | South Indiana |
| Kappa West | Κ W | West Indiana |
| Lambda | Λ | North Dakota, South Dakota, Minnesota |
| Mu North | Μ N | North Missouri |
| Mu East | Μ E | East Missouri |
| Mu South | Μ S | South Missouri, Arkansas, East Oklahoma |
| Mu West | Μ W | East Kansas, West Missouri |
| Nu | Ν | West Kansas |
| Omicron Northeast | Ο NE | Northeast California |
| Omicron Northwest | Ο NW | Northwest California |
| Omicron South | Ο S | South California |
| Omicron West | Ο W | Central South California |
| Pi North | Π N | Washington |
| Pi South | Π S | Oregon |
| Rho North | Ρ N | Northeast Texas |
| Rho Northwest | Ρ NW | Northwest Texas, West Oklahoma |
| Rho East | Ρ E | East Texas |
| Rho South | Ρ S | Central South Texas |
| Sigma North | Σ N | Michigan, Northwest Ohio |
| Sigma South | Σ S | Northeast Ohio |
| Tau North | Τ N | British Columbia, Alberta, Saskatchewan, Manitoba |
| Tau South | Τ S | Nevada, Idaho, Utah, Wyoming, Montana |
| Upsilon North | Υ N | West Pennsylvania |
| Upsilon South | Υ S | North West Virginia, Pittsburgh in Pennsylvania |
| Phi | Φ | Iowa, Central Illinois |
| Chi North | Χ N | North Florida |
| Chi East | Χ E | South Florida |
| Chi West | Χ W | Central Florida |
| Psi | Ψ | Nebraska, Colorado |
| Omega East | Ω E | New Mexico |
| Omega West | Ω W | Arizona, Las Vegas in Nevada |

== Chapters ==
In the following list, active chapters are indicted in bold and inactive chapters and institutions are in italics.

| Chapter | Charter date and range | Institution | Location | Status | Ref. |
|---|---|---|---|---|---|
| **Ohio Alpha** | December 26, 1848 – 1857; 1865–1873; 1885–2005; 2007–2018; 2021 | Miami University | Oxford, Ohio | Active | |
| **Indiana Alpha** | October 13, 1849 – 2005; 2008 | Indiana University Bloomington | Bloomington, Indiana | Active | |
| Kentucky Alpha (See **Kentucky Alpha-Delta**) | April 9, 1850 – August 9, 1901 | Centre College | Danville, Kentucky | Consolidated | (Note: In 1879, Kentucky Alpha absorbed Delta Kappa (local), established in 1867. Kentucky Alpha was renamed Kentucky Alpha-Delta in 1901.) (Note: Kentucky Alpha and "Kentucky Delta" consolidated to form the Kentucky Alpha-Delta chapter when Centre College absorbed the financially-troubled Central University in 1901. After its closure, Central University's campus was sold to the new Eastern Kentucky University in 1906.) |
| **Indiana Beta** | November 16, 1850 | Wabash College | Crawfordsville, Indiana | Active | |
| Ohio Gamma Prime | May 18, 1852 – 1854 | Wittenberg University | Springfield, Ohio | Inactive | |
| Texas Alpha Prime | June 9, 1853 – 1854 | Austin College | Austin, Texas | Inactive | |
| Kentucky Beta | October 17, 1854 – 1865 | Kentucky Military Institute | Lyndon, Kentucky | Inactive | (Note: Kentucky Military Institute closed in 1971.) |
| Kentucky Gamma | January 20, 1857 – 1857; 1875–1876 | Georgetown College | Georgetown, Kentucky | Inactive | |
| **Wisconsin Alpha** | June 27, 1857 – 1861; 1880–1962; 1977–2001; 2015 | University of Wisconsin–Madison | Madison, Wisconsin | Active | |
| Wisconsin Beta | February 3, 1859 – 1860; 1934–2010 | Lawrence University | Appleton, Wisconsin | Inactive | (Note: Chapter was restored in 1934 by the absorption of Theta Phi (local), established in 1897.) |
| Illinois Alpha | February 13, 1859 – 1861; 1886–2021 | Northwestern University | Evanston, Illinois | Inactive | |
| **Indiana Gamma** | October 22, 1859 – 2002; 2009 | Butler University | Indianapolis, Indiana | Active | |
| **Ohio Beta** | March 19, 1860 – 1861; 1971–1877; 1879–2018; 2021? | Ohio Wesleyan University | Delaware, Ohio | Active | |
| **Indiana Delta** | April 28, 1860 – 2004; 2008 – April 5, 2016; 2019 | Franklin College | Franklin, Indiana | Active | |
| **Indiana Epsilon** | April 6, 1861 | Hanover College | Hanover, Indiana | Active | |
| **Michigan Alpha** | November 28, 1864 – 1869; 1887–1998; 2004 | University of Michigan | Ann Arbor, Michigan | Active | |
| **Illinois Beta** | January 11, 1866 – 1871; 1897–2016; 2019 | University of Chicago | Chicago, Illinois | Active | |
| **Indiana Zeta** | February 15, 1868 – 1872; 1880 | DePauw University | Greencastle, Indiana | Active | |
| **Ohio Gamma** | March 29, 1868 – 1976; 1980 | Ohio University | Athens, Ohio | Active | |
| Indiana Eta | April 15, 1869 – 1870; 1969–2016 | Indiana State University | Terre Haute, Indiana | Inactive | (Note: Chapter was restored in 1969 by absorbing Chi Kappa Epsilon (local), established in 1968.) |
| Virginia Alpha | May 31, 1869 – 1896 | Roanoke College | Salem, Virginia | Inactive | |
| **Missouri Alpha** | November 26, 1870 – 2015; 2017 | University of Missouri | Columbia, Missouri | Active | |
| **Illinois Gamma** | January 12, 1871 – 1884; 2008 | Monmouth College | Monmouth, Illinois | Active | |
| Illinois Delta | January 12, 1871 – September 30, 1930 | Knox College | Galesburg, Illinois | Consolidated | (Note: Illinois Delta chapter absorbed Illinois Zeta chapter in 1930, at the demise of Lombard College.) |
| Georgia Alpha Prime | June 5, 1871 – 1872 | Oglethorpe University | Brookhaven, Georgia | Moved | (Note: Georgia Alpha chapter was briefly installed at Oglethorpe in June of 1871, but the charter was moved to the nearby University of Georgia in 1872. Both chapters are cited with the same 1871 founding date.) |
| **Georgia Alpha** | June 5, 1871 | University of Georgia | Athens, Georgia | Active | |
| Georgia Beta | June 15, 1871 – 2013 | Emory University | Atlanta, Georgia | Inactive | |
| Iowa Alpha | September 27, 1871 – 2009 | Iowa Wesleyan University | Mount Pleasant, Iowa | Inactive | (Note: In the Bond says September 19, 1902, doesn't seem to make sense that it is after Iowa Beta. Scroll of Phi Delta Volume XXXII says 1871) |
| **Georgia Gamma** | January 2, 1872 | Mercer University | Macon, Georgia | Active | |
| Ohio Delta | February 24, 1872 – 1913 | College of Wooster | Wooster, Ohio | Inactive | (Note: After the campus banned national fraternities and sororities in 1913, the Wooster chapter became Phi Delta Sigma (local), also known as "V Section" of Kinarden Hall, active from 1913 to 2005. See List of fraternities and sororities at the College of Wooster.) |
| New York Alpha | February 29, 1872 – 1876; 1886 – 1970; 1973 – 2026 | Cornell University | Ithaca, New York | Inactive | (Note: This chapter was restored in 1973 by absorbing Phi Delta Alpha (local), established in 1970 when the existing Phi Delta Theta chapter reverted to local status.) |
| Pennsylvania Alpha | June 5, 1873 – 1993 | Lafayette College | Easton, Pennsylvania | Inactive | (Note: Chapter formed from Upsilon Beta (local), established in 1868.) |
| **California Alpha** | June 8, 1873 – 1877; 1886–1969; 1973–1977; 1980 | University of California, Berkeley | Berkeley, California | Active | |
| **Michigan Beta** | November 9, 1873 – 1898; 1931–2004; 2014 | Michigan State University | East Lansing, Michigan | Active | (Note: This chapter was reestablished in 1931 by absorption of Phi Delta (local), which had formed at the closure of the Phi Delt chapter in 1898. It had survived for over thirty years as a local.) |
| **Virginia Beta** | November 18, 1873 – 2000; 2001 | University of Virginia | Charlottesville, Virginia | Active | (Note: This chapter was restored in 2001 by absorbing Phi Delta Alpha (local), which had been created when the Phi Delt chapter closed during the prior year.) |
| Virginia Gamma | February 2, 1874 – 1994; 2001–2023 | Randolph–Macon College | Ashland, Virginia | Inactive | (Note: This chapter absorbed the Upsilon chapter of Kappa Sigma Kappa in 1886, at the demise of that small national.) |
| **Ohio Epsilon** | January 19, 1875 – 1896; 1924 | University of Akron | Akron, Ohio | Active | (Note: This chapter was restored in 1924 by the absorption of Zeta Alpha Epsilon (local), established in 1896. This local may have been a successor organization to the earlier Phi Delt chapter, that had closed that same year.) |
| **Nebraska Alpha** | March 16, 1875 – 1876; 1883–1998; 2004 | University of Nebraska–Lincoln | Lincoln, Nebraska | Active | |
| **Pennsylvania Beta** | May 5, 1875 – 1997; 2005 | Gettysburg College | Gettysburg, Pennsylvania | Active | |
| Virginia Delta | September 30, 1875 – 1895; 1939–2007 | University of Richmond | Richmond, Virginia | Inactive | (Note: This chapter absorbed the Nu chapter of Kappa Sigma Kappa in 1886, at the demise of that small national. In its 1939 restoration, it absorbed Phi Delta Omega (local), established in 1926.) |
| Pennsylvania Gamma | December 4, 1875 – 2020 | Washington & Jefferson College | Washington, Pennsylvania | Inactive | |
| Tennessee Alpha | January 20, 1876 – 2004; 2010–2017; 2023 | Vanderbilt University | Nashville, Tennessee | Active | |
| Pennsylvania Delta Prime (see **Pennsylvania Eta**) | 1876–1877 | Lehigh University | Bethlehem, Pennsylvania | Inactive, Reassigned | (Note: The chapter at Lehigh was originally called Pennsylvania Delta when formed in 1876. It closed three years later, but by the time a chapter re-opened on that campus, its original name had been reassigned to the chapter at Allegheny College. Lehigh's new chapter was renamed Pennsylvania Eta.) |
| **Missouri Beta Prime** | May 29, 1876 – 1878; 2006 | Central Methodist University | Fayette, Missouri | Active | (Note: At its 2006 restoration, this chapter absorbed Sigma Alpha Chi (local), established in 1945.) |
| **Mississippi Alpha** | June 9, 1877 – 1912; 1926 | University of Mississippi | Oxford, Mississippi | Active | |
| **Alabama Alpha** | October 17, 1877 – 1878; 1883 | University of Alabama | Tuscaloosa, Alabama | Active | |
| Virginia Epsilon | February 9, 1878 – 1889 | Virginia Military Institute | Lexington, Virginia | Inactive | (Note: This chapter absorbed the founding Gamma chapter of Kappa Sigma Kappa in 1886, at the demise of that small national.) |
| Illinois Epsilon | May 23, 1878 – 1897 | Illinois Wesleyan University | Bloomington, Illinois | Inactive | |
| Texas Alpha | May 23, 1878 – 1883 | Trinity University | San Antonio, Texas | Inactive | |
| North Carolina Alpha | September 6, 1878 – 1879; 1926–2021 | Duke University | Durham, North Carolina | Inactive | (Note: Chapter reformed in 1926 by absorbing Epsilon Alpha Sigma (local), established in 1924.) |
| Illinois Zeta | November 4, 1878 – September 30, 1930 | Lombard College | Galesburg, Illinois | Consolidated | (Note: Chapter formed from Phi Sigma (local), established in 1857. It went inactive when Lombard College closed.) |
| **Alabama Beta** | January 30, 1879 – 2014; March 5, 2017 | Auburn University | Auburn, Alabama | Active | |
| South Carolina Alpha | January 31, 1879 – 1884 | Wofford College | Spartanburg, South Carolina | Inactive | |
| **Pennsylvania Delta** | May 8, 1879 – 19xx ?; 2002 | Allegheny College | Meadville, Pennsylvania | Active | |
| Vermont Alpha | October 30, 1879 – 2011 | University of Vermont | Burlington, Vermont | Inactive | |
| **Missouri Beta** | October 27, 1880 | Westminster College | Fulton, Missouri | Active | |
| Pennsylvania Epsilon | October 27, 1880 – 201x ? | Dickinson College | Carlisle, Pennsylvania | Inactive | |
| Minnesota Alpha | October 12, 1881 – 1889; 1891–1991; 2010–2016 | University of Minnesota | Minneapolis, Minnesota | Colony | (Note: Chapter reformed as a colony in 2019.) |
| Iowa Beta | March 27, 1882 – 2005; 2009 | University of Iowa | Iowa City, Iowa | Inactive | |
| **Kansas Alpha** | November 24, 1882 | University of Kansas | Lawrence, Kansas | Active | |
| Michigan Gamma | January 23, 1883 – 1989 | Hillsdale College | Hillsdale, Michigan | Inactive | |
| Tennessee Beta | March 21, 1883 – 199x ?; 2003–2005 | Sewanee: The University of the South | Sewanee, Tennessee | Inactive | (Note: At its 2003 restoration, this chapter absorbed the Phi Society (local).) |
| Ohio Zeta | October 6, 1883 – 2020 | Ohio State University | Columbus, Ohio | Inactive | |
| **Pennsylvania Zeta** | November 22, 1883 | University of Pennsylvania | Philadelphia, Pennsylvania | Active | |
| New York Beta | December 3, 1883 – 2017 | Union College | Schenectady, New York | Inactive | |
| Maine Alpha | April 1, 1884 – 1986 | Colby College | Waterville, Maine | Inactive | (Note: Chapter formed from the Logonia Club (local), established in 1882.) (Note: Social fraternities and sororities are permanently banned at Amherst, Colby, and Williams.) |
| New York Gamma | February 19, 1884 – 1891 | City College of New York | New York City, New York | Inactive | |
| New York Delta | May 12, 1884 – 1890; 1893–1935 | Columbia University | New York City, New York | Inactive | |
| New Hampshire Alpha | October 30, 1884 – 1960 | Dartmouth College | Hanover, New Hampshire | Withdrew | (Note: The New Hampshire Alpha chapter withdrew to become Phi Delta Alpha (local) in 1960. See Dartmouth College Greek organizations#Fraternities.) |
| **North Carolina Beta** | March 29, 1885 | University of North Carolina at Chapel Hill | Chapel Hill, North Carolina | Active | (Note: This chapter absorbed the Omega chapter of Kappa Sigma Kappa in 1886, at the demise of that small national. Omega was ΚΣΚ's youngest chapter, only having formed in 1885.) |
| Kentucky Delta (See **Kentucky Alpha-Delta**) | November 18, 1885 – August 9, 1901 | Central University of Kentucky | Richmond, Kentucky | Consolidated | |
| Massachusetts Alpha | February 1, 1886 – 1953; 1956–1961 | Williams College | Williamstown, Massachusetts | Inactive | (Note: At its 1956 restoration, this chapter absorbed the Phi Delta club (local), established in 1953, likely a continuation of the Phi Delt chapter that had failed.) |
| **Texas Gamma** | March 20, 1886 | Southwestern University | Georgetown, Texas | Active | (Note: Chapter formed from the R. of V. chapter of the Rainbow Fraternity, established in 1882. It left that fraternity in 1886, but retained its original date of installation as this was a minor merger, adding two chapters to Phi Delta Theta.) |
| New York Epsilon | February 7, 1887 – 1994; September 23, 2012 – 2020; 2026 | Syracuse University | Syracuse, New York | Active | (Note: Chapter formed from Sigma Phi (local), established in 1871. It was not a part of the small national of the same name.) |
| **Virginia Zeta** | February 21, 1887 – 2018 | Washington and Lee University | Lexington, Virginia | Inactive | (Note: Chapter formed from the Epsilon chapter of Kappa Sigma Kappa, at the demise of that small national. It was established in 1871.) |
| Alabama Gamma | March 5, 1887 – 1896 | Southern University | Birmingham, Alabama | Inactive | (Note: Southern University merged with Birmingham College in 1918. Birmingham-Southern College ceased operations in 2024.) |
| Pennsylvania Eta | April 15, 1887 – 2001; 2014–2023 | Lehigh University | Bethlehem, Pennsylvania | Inactive | |
| Massachusetts Beta | May 9, 1888 – 1956 | Amherst College | Amherst, Massachusetts | Inactive | |
| **Louisiana Alpha** | November 19, 1889 – 1970; November 11, 2023 | Tulane University | New Orleans, Louisiana | Active | (Note: This chapter originated as the Incognito Society (local), established in 1889.) |
| Missouri Gamma | March 28, 1891 – 2018 | Washington University in St. Louis | St. Louis, Missouri | Inactive | (Note: Chapter formed from the Textra Club, established in 1888.) |
| California Beta | October 24, 1891 – 1998 | Stanford University | Stanford, California | Inactive | |
| **Illinois Eta** | February 9, 1893 | University of Illinois Urbana-Champaign | Champaign, Illinois | Active | (Note: Chapter formed from Alpha Nu (local), established in 1893.) |
| **Indiana Theta** | March 17, 1893 | Purdue University | West Lafayette, Indiana | Active | |
| **Ohio Eta** | December 21, 1896 | Case Western Reserve University | Cleveland, Ohio | Active | (Note: Chapter formed from Phi Lambda Omicron (local), established in 1895.) |
| Rhode Island Alpha | February 22, 1889 – 1964 | Brown University | Providence, Rhode Island | Inactive | (Note: Chapter formed from Sigma Rho (local), established in 1888.) |
| **Ohio Theta** | July 2, 1898 | University of Cincinnati | Cincinnati, Ohio | Active | (Note: Chapter formed from Gamma Nu Sigma (local), established in 1897.) |
| **Washington Alpha** | February 12, 1901 | University of Washington | Seattle, Washington | Active | (Note: Chapter formed from Delta Phi (local) in 1899.) |
| **Kentucky Epsilon** | May 25, 1901 – 1972; 1979–1990; 2004–2014; 2018 | University of Kentucky | Lexington, Kentucky | Active | (Note: Chapter formed from Phi Tau (local), established in 1899.) |
| **Kentucky Alpha-Delta** | August 9, 1901 | Centre College | Danville, Kentucky | Active | |
| **Quebec Alpha** | April 5, 1902 – 1974; 1978–200x ?; 2019 | McGill University | Montreal, Quebec, Canada | Active | |
| **Colorado Alpha** | June 7, 1902 – 19xx ?; 1995–2002; December 8, 2018 | University of Colorado Boulder | Boulder, Colorado | Active | (Note: Chapter formed from Lambda Gamma (local), established in 1901.) |
| **Georgia Delta** | June 11, 1902 | Georgia Tech | Atlanta, Georgia | Active | (Note: Chapter formed from Beta Phi (local), established in 1902.) |
| **Pennsylvania Theta** | April 23, 1904 – 2007; September 7, 2024 | Pennsylvania State University | State College, Pennsylvania | Active | (Note: This chapter originated as Delta Chi (local), established in 1903. There was no connection to the national fraternity of that same name.) |
| **Ontario Alpha** | May 28, 1906 – 201x ?; February 2021 | University of Toronto | Toronto, Ontario, Canada | Active | (Note: Chapter formed from Zeta Sigma Nu (local), established in 1902.) |
| **South Dakota Alpha** | December 18, 1906 | University of South Dakota | Vermillion, South Dakota | Active | (Note: Chapter formed from the Tridentia Club, established in 1902.) |
| **Idaho Alpha** | December 31, 1908 | University of Idaho | Moscow, Idaho | Active | (Note: Chapter formed from Kappa Phi Alpha (local), established in 1900.) |
| **Kansas Beta** | October 1, 1910 | Washburn University | Topeka, Kansas | Active | (Note: Chapter formed from Delta Phi (local), established in 1905.) |
| **Oregon Alpha** | May 30, 1912 – 1970; 1980–2000; 2009–2015; 2021 | University of Oregon | Eugene, Oregon | Active | (Note: Chapter formed from Delta Sigma (local), established in 1910.) |
| Colorado Beta | April 5, 1913 – 19xx ? | Colorado College | Colorado Springs, Colorado | Inactive | (Note: Chapter formed from Alpha Tau Delta (local), established in 1908.) |
| **North Dakota Alpha** | April 19, 1913 – 2011; 2014 | University of North Dakota | Grand Forks, North Dakota | Active | (Note: Chapter formed from the Varsity Bachelors in 1905.) |
| **Iowa Gamma** | May 11, 1913 | Iowa State University | Ames, Iowa | Active | (Note: Chapter formed from the Aztec Society, established in 1904.) |
| Ohio Iota | March 26, 1915 – 2016 | Denison University | Granville, Ohio | Inactive | (Note: Chapter formed from Alpha Nu Sigma (local), established in 1911.) |
| **Washington Beta** | April 2, 1915 | Whitman College | Walla Walla, Washington | Active | (Note: Chapter formed from the Illahee Club (local), established in 1908.) |
| **Utah Alpha** | January 15, 1916 – 2005; 2010 | University of Utah | Salt Lake City, Utah | Active | (Note: Chapter formed from the Amici Fidissimi Society (local), established in 1902.) |
| **Oregon Beta** | January 2, 1918 | Oregon State University | Corvallis, Oregon | Active | (Note: Chapter formed from Kappa Sigma Nu (local), established in 1906.) |
| **Washington Gamma** | March 12, 1918 | Washington State University | Pullman, Washington | Active | (Note: Chapter formed from the Delta Club (local), established in 1911.) |
| **Pennsylvania Iota** | March 15, 1918 – 1960; 1971–1997; November 17, 2006 | University of Pittsburgh | Pittsburgh, Pennsylvania | Active | (Note: Chapter formed from Delta Sigma Pi (local), established in 1908. At its 1971 restoration, it absorbed Gamma Tau Alpha (local), established in 1968.) |
| **New York Zeta** | March 30, 1918 – 1968; 1973 | Colgate University | Hamilton, New York | Active | (Note: Chapter formed from Sigma Alpha (local), established in 1909. At its 1973 restoration, it absorbed Phi Delta Zeta (local), which had formed in 1968 with the demise of the original chapter. The local was likely a continuation.) |
| **Oklahoma Alpha** | April 6, 1918 – 199x ?; 1999 | University of Oklahoma | Norman, Oklahoma | Active | (Note: Chapter formed from Delta Theta (local), established in 1916.) |
| Pennsylvania Kappa | April 11, 1918 – 1958 | Swarthmore College | Swarthmore, Pennsylvania | Inactive | (Note: Chapter formed from Tau Alpha Omicron (local), established in 1907.) |
| **Kansas Gamma** | February 25, 1921 | Kansas State University | Manhattan, Kansas | Active | (Note: Chapter formed from Sigma Phi Delta (local) in 1914.) |
| **Montana Alpha** | March 5, 1921 – 1970; 1974–2004; 201x ? | University of Montana | Missoula, Montana | Active | (Note: Chapter formed from Delta Rho (local), established in 1916.) |
| **Colorado Gamma** | March 11, 1921 – 1938; 1952–1974; 1988 | Colorado State University | Fort Collins, Colorado | Active | (Note: Chapter formed from Alpha Pi Lambda (local), established in 1909. At its 1952 restoration, it absorbed Phi Delta Gamma (local), established in 1947.) |
| **Texas Delta** | April 26, 1923 | Southern Methodist University | Dallas, Texas | Active | (Note: Chapter formed from Kappa Theta Phi (local), established in 1919.) |
| **Arizona Alpha** | May 6, 1923 | University of Arizona | Tucson, Arizona | Active | (Note: Chapter formed from Omega Kappa (local), established in 1919.) |
| California Gamma | February 20, 1925 – 1970; 1976–1994; May 18, 2013 – 2022 | University of California, Los Angeles | Los Angeles, California | Inactive | (Note: Chapter formed from Phi Kappa Kappa (local), established in 1919.) |
| **Florida Alpha** | April 10, 1925 | University of Florida | Gainesville, Florida | Banned | (Note: Chapter formed from Beta Pi (local), established in 1921.) |
| West Virginia Alpha | March 12, 1927 – 2019 | West Virginia University | Morgantown, West Virginia | Inactive | |
| **North Carolina Gamma** | February 23, 1929 | Davidson College | Davidson, North Carolina | Active | (Note: Chapter formed from Delta Theta Chi (local), established in 1921.) |
| **Alberta Alpha** | September 12, 1930 | University of Alberta | Edmonton, Alberta, Canada | Active | (Note: Chapter formed from Alpha Rho Tau (local), established in 1929.) |
| **Manitoba Alpha** | September 19, 1930 | University of Manitoba | Winnipeg, Manitoba, Canada | Active | (Note: Chapter formed from Alpha Chi (local), established in 1927.) |
| Illinois Delta-Zeta | September 30, 1930 – 2004 | Knox College | Galesburg, Illinois | Inactive | |
| **British Columbia Alpha** | November 1, 1930 | University of British Columbia | Vancouver, British Columbia, Canada | Active | (Note: Chapter formed from Lambda Sigma Delta (local), established in 1927.) |
| **Maryland Alpha** | November 11, 1930 | University of Maryland, College Park | College Park, Maryland | Active | (Note: Chapter formed from Nu Sigma Omicron (local), established in 1916.) |
| **Nova Scotia Alpha** | November 14, 1930 | Dalhousie University | Halifax, Nova Scotia, Canada | Active | (Note: Chapter formed from Kappa Alpha Phi (local), established in 1929.) |
| **Massachusetts Gamma** | October 29, 1932 | Massachusetts Institute of Technology | Cambridge, Massachusetts | Active | (Note: Chapter formed from Psi Delta (local), established in 1922.) |
| Wyoming Alpha | November 24, 1934 – 1994 | University of Wyoming | Laramie, Wyoming | Inactive | (Note: Chapter formed from Delta Mu Alpha (local), established in 1922.) |
| Florida Beta | February 1, 1935 – 1943; 1968–2019 | Rollins College | Winter Park, Florida | Inactive | (Note: Chapter formed from Kappa Phi Sigma (local), established in 1926. At its 1968 reorganization, it absorbed Phi Delta Beta (local), established in 1966.) |
| Louisiana Beta | January 10, 1939 – 2003; 2005 – September 18, 2017 | Louisiana State University | Baton Rouge, Louisiana | Inactive | (Note: Chapter formed from Delta Phi (local), established in 1937.) |
| **New Mexico Alpha** | December 7, 1946 – 1978; 1989-2007; October 19, 2013 | University of New Mexico | Albuquerque, New Mexico | Active | (Note: Chapter formed from Phi Delta (local), established in 1946.) |
| **Oklahoma Beta** | December 12, 1946 – 2014; March 11, 2018 | Oklahoma State University | Stillwater, Oklahoma | Active | (Note: Chapter formed from Zeta Chi (local), established in 1946.) |
| Oregon Gamma | January 4, 1947 – 2021 | Willamette University | Salem, Oregon | Inactive | (Note: Chapter formed from Alpha Psi Delta (local), established in 1920.) |
| **Arkansas Alpha** | October 8, 1948 – 2009; February 19, 2011 | University of Arkansas | Fayetteville, Arkansas | Active | (Note: Chapter formed from Delta Theta (local), established in 1946.) |
| **California Delta** | January 30, 1949 – 2002; 2006 | University of Southern California | Los Angeles, California | Active | (Note: Chapter formed from Phi Delta (local), established in 1948.) |
| Ohio Kappa | October 28, 1950 – 2022 | Bowling Green State University | Bowling Green, Ohio | Inactive | (Note: Chapter formed from Phi Delta (local), established in 1946.) |
| Illinois Theta | November 18, 1950 – 1961 | Lake Forest College | Lake Forest, Illinois | Inactive | (Note: Chapter formed from Digamma Alpha Upsilon (local), established in 1906.) |
| Florida Gamma | January 31, 1951 – 2020 | Florida State University | Tallahassee, Florida | Inactive | (Note: Chapter formed from Beta Phi (local), established in 1947.) |
| **Washington Delta** | December 6, 1952 | University of Puget Sound | Tacoma, Washington | Active | (Note: Chapter formed from Delta Kappa Phi (local), established in 1922.) |
| **Texas Epsilon** | May 2, 1953 – 2014; 201x ? | Texas Tech University | Lubbock, Texas | Active | (Note: Chapter formed from the Silver Key Club (local), established in 1928.) |
| **Indiana Iota** | November 27, 1954 – 2005; 2013 | Valparaiso University | Valparaiso, Indiana | Active | (Note: Chapter formed from Kappa Iota Pi (local), established in 1919.) |
| **Florida Delta** | December 11, 1954 – 1972; 1975–1982; 1999 | University of Miami | Coral Gables, Florida | Active | (Note: Chapter formed from Phi Delta (local), established in 1949.) |
| **Ohio Lambda** | December 11, 1954 – 1972; 1988–2005; 2009 | Kent State University | Kent, Ohio | Active | (Note: Chapter formed from Phi Gamma Theta (local), established in 1947.) |
| **California Epsilon** | March 26, 1955 – 2006; 2011 | University of California, Davis | Davis, California | Active | (Note: Chapter formed from the Calpha Club (local), established in 1911.) |
| **Texas Zeta** | May 28, 1955 | Texas Christian University | Fort Worth, Texas | Active | (Note: Chapter formed from Phi Delta (local), established in 1954.) |
| **Arizona Beta** | November 29, 1958 – 1999; March 26, 2021 | Arizona State University | Tempe, Arizona | Active | (Note: Chapter formed from Phi Delta Beta (local), established in 1955.) |
| **Kansas Delta** | May 9, 1959 | Wichita State University | Wichita, Kansas | Active | (Note: Chapter formed from Phi Upsilon Sigma (local), established in 1928.) |
| **Wisconsin Gamma** | November 12, 1960 | Ripon College | Ripon, Wisconsin | Active | (Note: Chapter formed from Alpha Phi Omega (local), established in 1919.) |
| Ontario Beta | November 10, 1962 – 1976; 1984–20xx ?; 2015–2022 | University of Western Ontario | London, Ontario, Canada | Inactive | (Note: Chapter formed from Phi Delta Beta (local), established in 1960.) |
| **Texas Eta** | December 15, 1962 – 2019; 2023 | Stephen F. Austin State University | Nacogdoches, Texas | Active | (Note: Chapter formed from the Foresters Club (local), established in 1943.) |
| Tennessee Gamma | September 14, 1963 – 1999; 2004–2023 | University of Tennessee | Knoxville, Tennessee | Inactive | (Note: Chapter formed from Phi Delta Gamma (local), established in 1962.) |
| Minnesota Beta | November 21, 1964 | Minnesota State University, Mankato | Mankato, Minnesota | Active | (Note: Chapter formed from Alpha Beta Mu (local), established in 1956.) |
| **Texas Theta** | December 12, 1964 – 1995; 2003 | West Texas A&M University | Canyon, Texas | Active | (Note: Chapter formed from Phi Kappa Delta (local), established in 1963.) |
| Kentucky Zeta | January 9, 1965 – 1974 | Kentucky Wesleyan College | Owensboro, Kentucky | Inactive | (Note: Chapter formed from the Mystic Thirteen Club (local), established in 1929.) |
| **Michigan Delta** | February 13, 1965 | Kettering University | Flint, Michigan | Active | (Note: Chapter formed from Alpha Delta Fraternity (local), established in 1926.) |
| Texas Iota | October 16, 1965 – 1994 | Lamar University | Beaumont, Texas | Inactive | (Note: Chapter formed from Delta Rho (local), established in 1963.) |
| **Kentucky Eta** | May 7, 1966 – 20xx ?; 2015 | Western Kentucky University | Bowling Green, Kentucky | Active | (Note: Chapter formed from Phi Delta Chi (local), established in 1962.) |
| **Ohio Mu** | November 19, 1966 | Ashland University | Ashland, Ohio | Active | (Note: Chapter formed from Phi Delta Sigma (local), established in 1964.) |
| **Nebraska Beta** | December 10, 1966 – 2003; 2013 | University of Nebraska at Kearney | Kearney, Nebraska | Active | (Note: Chapter formed from Phi Phi Phi (local), established in 1955. It had no connection with the small national fraternity that dissolved around 1905.) |
| **Florida Epsilon** | April 8, 1967 | University of South Florida | Tampa, Florida | Active | (Note: Chapter formed from the Arete Club, established in 1960.) |
| **California Zeta** | April 22, 1967 – 2012; 2014 | California State University, Northridge | Los Angeles, California | Active | (Note: Chapter formed from Phi Sigma Tau (local), established in 1958.) |
| **California Eta** | April 23, 1967 – 1992 | University of California, Santa Barbara | Santa Barbara, California | Colony | |
| Louisiana Gamma | March 16, 1968 – 1994 | University of Louisiana at Lafayette | Lafayette, Louisiana | Inactive | |
| Montana Beta | September 21, 1968 – 1976 | Montana State University | Bozeman, Montana | Inactive | (Note: Chapter formed from Phi Delta Beta (local), established in 1965.) |
| Florida Zeta | October 25, 1968 – 2018 | Jacksonville University | Jacksonville, Florida | Inactive | (Note: Chapter formed from Phi Delta Delta (local), established in 1953.) |
| **Texas Kappa** | December 14, 1968 – 2004; 2008 | University of Texas at Arlington | Arlington, Texas | Active | (Note: Chapter formed from Alpha Sigma Chi (local), established in 1961.) |
| **Kansas Epsilon** | January 18, 1969 – 2019; 2022 | Emporia State University | Emporia, Kansas | Active | (Note: Chapter formed from Beta Sigma Tau (local), established in 1966.) |
| **Kentucky Theta** | April 26, 1969 | Eastern Kentucky University | Richmond, Kentucky | Active | (Note: Chapter formed from Alpha Chi Iota (local), established in 1966.) (Note: A previous chapter of Phi Delt had existed at Eastern Kentucky University when that property was owned by Central University. That group merged into the chapter at Centre College.) |
| Tennessee Delta | May 5, 1969 – 2022 | Tennessee Tech | Cookeville, Tennessee | Inactive | (Note: Chapter formed from Sigma Tau Omega (local), established in 1966.) |
| **Indiana Kappa** | November 2, 1969 | Ball State University | Muncie, Indiana | Active | (Note: Chapter formed from Chi Kappa Epsilon (local), established in 1964.) |
| **South Carolina Gamma** | March 7, 1970 | Clemson University | Clemson, South Carolina | Active | (Note: Chapter formed from Delta Phi Kappa (local), established in 1962.) |
| Alberta Beta | April 25, 1970 – 1976 | University of Calgary | Calgary, Alberta, Canada | Inactive | (Note: Chapter formed from Phi Delta Beta (local), established in 1964.) |
| **Georgia Epsilon** | April 3, 1971 – 1989; 1994–20xx ?; 2016 | Georgia Southern University | Statesboro, Georgia | Active | (Note: Chapter formed from Kappa Theta (local), established in 1968.) |
| **Maryland Beta** | April 24, 1971 | McDaniel College | Westminster, Maryland | Active | (Note: Chapter formed from Pi Alpha Alpha (local), established in 1923.) |
| **Oklahoma Gamma** | December 11, 1971 – 1992; April 29, 2011 | Southwestern Oklahoma State University | Weatherford, Oklahoma | Active | (Note: Chapter formed from the College Diners Club (local), established in 1966. At its 2011 restoration, it absorbed Kappa Gamma Beta (local), which had formed in 2002.) |
| **Nevada Alpha** | April 22, 1972 | University of Nevada, Reno | Reno, Nevada | Active | (Note: Chapter formed from Phi Delta Alpha (local), established in 1969.) |
| **Virginia Eta** | April 29, 1972 | Virginia Tech | Blacksburg, Virginia | Active | (Note: Chapter formed from Sigma Alpha Kappa (local), established in 1956.) |
| Florida Eta | February 3, 1973 – 1974 | University of West Florida | Pensacola, Florida | Inactive | (Note: Chapter formed from Phi Delta (local), established in 1971.) |
| Ohio Nu | April 28, 1973 – 1978 | Youngstown State University | Youngstown, Ohio | Inactive | (Note: Chapter formed from Sigma Beta Phi (local), established in 1969.) |
| Georgia Zeta | February 8, 1975 – 199x ? ; 2025 | Georgia College & State University | Milledgeville, Georgia | Active | |
| **California Theta** | March 9, 1975 – 200x ?; March 9, 2013 | University of California, Irvine | Irvine, California | Active | |
| **Texas Lambda** | January 15, 1977 | Baylor University | Waco, Texas | Active | (Note: Chapter formed from the Tryon Coterie Club (local), established on December 1, 1946. As a result, it goes by the name Phi Delta Theta-The Tryon Coterie.) |
| California Iota | May 14, 1978 – 1999 | San Jose State University | San Jose, California | Inactive | (Note: Chapter formed from Phi Delta Iota (local), established in 1977.) |
| Louisiana Delta | February 25, 1979 – 200x ? | Louisiana State University Shreveport | Shreveport, Louisiana | Inactive | |
| **Florida Theta** | March 24, 1979 – 2003; 2022 | University of Tampa | Tampa, Florida | Active | (Note: Chapter formed from Phi Delta (local), established in 1978.) |
| **Texas Mu** | October 18, 1980 – 1997; 2002–2012; 2023 | Texas State University | San Marcos, Texas | Active | |
| **Florida Iota** | January 1, 1981 | University of Central Florida | Orlando, Florida | Active | |
| **California Kappa** | April 30, 1982 – 199x ?; May 15, 2016 | University of California, San Diego | San Diego, California | Active | |
| **South Carolina Beta** | October 26, 1882 – 1893; 1964–2000; January 26, 2019 | University of South Carolina | Columbia, South Carolina | Active | (Note: At its 1964 restoration, this chapter absorbed Phi Delta Beta (local), established in 1962.) |
| **Oregon Delta** | November 6, 1982 | Oregon Institute of Technology | Klamath Falls, Oregon | Active | (Note: Chapter formed from Delta Phi Omega (local), established in 1980.) |
| **New Hampshire Beta** | January 15, 1983 | Southern New Hampshire University | Manchester, New Hampshire | Active | (Note: Chapter formed from Phi Delta (local), established in 1980.) |
| Missouri Delta | March 19, 1983 – 1996; 2000–2021 | Saint Louis University | St. Louis, Missouri | Inactive | (Note: Chapter formed from Pi Delta Theta (local), established before 1983.) |
| Michigan Epsilon | April 30, 1983 – December 2016 | Northwood University | Midland, Michigan | Inactive | |
| Texas Beta | October 15, 1883 – 1997; 2000–2023 | University of Texas at Austin | Austin, Texas | Inactive | (Note: Chapter formed from the L.K.S. chapter of the Rainbow Fraternity, established in 1883. It left that fraternity in 1886, but retained its original date of installation as this was a minor merger, adding two chapters to Phi Delta Theta. At its 2000 restoration, it absorbed the Texas B.K. Club, established in 1999.) |
| **Pennsylvania Lambda** | September 15, 1984 – 19xx ?; March 4, 2012 | Indiana University of Pennsylvania | Indiana, Pennsylvania | Active | |
| Missouri Epsilon | April 28, 1985 – 2018 | Missouri State University | Springfield, Missouri | Inactive | |
| **Pennsylvania Mu** | October 18, 1985 | Widener University | Chester, Pennsylvania | Active | |
| **Texas Nu** | December 7, 1985 | Texas A&M University | College Station, Texas | Active | |
| **New York Eta** | February 7, 1986 – 2016; 2019 | Rochester Institute of Technology | Rochester, New York | Active | (Note: Chapter formed from Delta Sigma Pi (local), established in 1961.) |
| West Virginia Beta | April 8, 1986 – 1994 | Marshall University | Huntington, West Virginia | Inactive | |
| California Lambda | May 10, 1986 – 200x ? | University of the Pacific | Stockton, California | Inactive | |
| Indiana Lambda | October 11, 1986 – December 4, 2017 | University of Southern Indiana | Evansville, Indiana | Inactive | |
| California Mu | April 4, 1987 – 200x ? | University of California, Riverside | Riverside, California | Inactive | |
| **California Nu** | November 7, 1987 – 2005; 2023 | California Polytechnic State University, San Luis Obispo | San Luis Obispo, California | Active | (Note: Chapter formed from Phi Delta Omega (local), established in 1986.) |
| **Florida Kappa** | January 9, 1988 – 199x ?; April 1, 2016 | Florida International University | University Park, Florida | Active | |
| Pennsylvania Nu | January 16, 1988 – xxxx ? | West Chester University | West Chester, Pennsylvania | Inactive | |
| British Columbia Beta | 1988–1995 | University of Victoria | Victoria, British Columbia, Canada | Inactive | |
| **California Xi** | April 16, 1988 – 1996; 2000 | California State University, Chico | Chico, California | Active | (Note: Chapter formed from Alpha Sigma Omega (local), established in 1960.) |
| **New Jersey Alpha** | April 23, 1988 – 2005; 2009–2017 | Rutgers University–New Brunswick | New Brunswick, New Jersey | Colony | (Note: Chapter reformed as a colony on November 22, 2024.) |
| **North Carolina Delta** | October 22, 1988 | North Carolina State University | Raleigh, North Carolina | Active | |
| Wisconsin Delta | November 11, 1988 – 1994 | Marquette University | Milwaukee, Wisconsin | Inactive | |
| **California Omicron** | December 3, 1988 – 2005; May 15, 2016 | California State University, Sacramento | Sacramento, California | Active | |
| **California Pi** | April 22, 1989 – 1995; April 10, 2010 | San Diego State University | San Diego, California | Active | |
| **Texas Xi** | March 3, 1990 – 200x ?; 2014 | University of Texas at San Antonio | San Antonio, Texas | Active | (Note: At its reorganization in 2014 this chapter absorbed Delta Kappa Sigma (local).) |
| **Ontario Gamma** | March 17, 1990 | McMaster University | Hamilton, Ontario, Canada | Active | |
| Massachusetts Delta | April 21, 1990 – 199x ? | Bentley University | Waltham, Massachusetts | Inactive | |
| **Ontario Delta** | November 17, 1990 | York University | Toronto, Ontario, Canada | Active | |
| New York Theta | December 8, 1990 – 199x ? | State University of New York at Oneonta | Oneonta, New York | Inactive | |
| Washington Epsilon | March 2, 1991 – 200x ?; 200x ?–2023 | Eastern Washington University | Cheney, Washington | Inactive | |
| Nevada Beta | March 16, 1991 – 201x ?; 20xx ?–2023 | University of Nevada, Las Vegas | Paradise, Nevada | Inactive | (Note: Chapter formed from Phi Beta Delta (local), established in 1989.) |
| Oklahoma Delta | April 6, 1991 – 200x ? | Cameron University | Lawton, Oklahoma | Inactive | (Note: Chapter formed from Gamma Chi (local), established in 1989.) |
| Texas Omicron | April 14, 1991 – 200x ? | University of North Texas | Denton, Texas | Inactive | |
| **Mississippi Beta** | April 20, 1991 | Mississippi State University | Mississippi State, Mississippi | Active | |
| Oregon Epsilon | May 25, 1991 – 2018; 2021–2022 | Portland State University | Portland, Oregon | Inactive | |
| New York Iota | September 29, 1991 – 199x ? | University at Buffalo | Buffalo, New York | Inactive | (Note: Chapter formed from the New Brotherhood Club (local), established in 1989.) |
| **Texas Pi** | January 18, 1992 | Sam Houston State University | Huntsville, Texas | Active | |
| **Missouri Zeta** | April 4, 1992 – 2002; May 3, 2014 | Southeast Missouri State University | Cape Girardeau, Missouri | Active | |
| **Maryland Gamma** | April 25, 1992 | Washington College | Chestertown, Maryland | Active | |
| **Ontario Epsilon** | November 21, 1992 – 200x ?; 2017 | Carleton University | Ottawa, Ontario, Canada | Active | |
| Tennessee Epsilon | January 23, 1993 – 201x ? | University of Tennessee at Chattanooga | Chattanooga, Tennessee | Inactive | |
| Florida Lambda | January 30, 1993 – 200x ? | Ringling College of Art and Design | Sarasota, Florida | Inactive | (Note: Chapter formed from Alpha Sigma Beta (local), established in 1975.) |
| Virginia Theta | March 19, 1994 – 2018 | University of Lynchburg | Lynchburg, Virginia | Inactive | |
| Delaware Alpha | April 9, 1994 – 199x ? | University of Delaware | Newark, Delaware | Inactive | |
| Missouri Eta | April 16, 1994 – 2022 | Missouri Western State University | St. Joseph, Missouri | Inactive | (Note: Chapter formed from Alpha Delta Nu (local), established in 1994.) |
| Pennsylvania Xi | April 23, 1994 – 2021 | Penn West Clarion | Clarion, Pennsylvania | Inactive | |
| Illinois Iota | December 10, 1994 – 1999 | Eastern Illinois University | Charleston, Illinois | Inactive | |
| Ontario Zeta | March 25, 1995 – 1998 | Brock University | St. Catharines, Ontario, Canada | Inactive | (Note: Chapter formed from Phi Delta Zeta (local), established in 1993.) |
| Kansas Zeta | April 8, 1995 – 201x ? | Southwestern College | Winfield, Kansas | Inactive | (Note: Chapter formed from Theta Phi Delta (local), established in 1967.) |
| **California Rho** | May 13, 1995 | University of La Verne | La Verne, California | Active | (Note: Chapter formed from Sigma Tau (local), established in 1990.) |
| Arizona Gamma | October 15, 1995 – 2020 | Northern Arizona University | Flagstaff, Arizona | Inactive | |
| **California Sigma** | April 19, 1997 | Sonoma State University | Rohnert Park, California | Active | |
| **Nebraska Gamma** | April 26, 1997 | Creighton University | Omaha, Nebraska | Active | |
| **Pennsylvania Omicron** | March 26, 1999 | Shippensburg University of Pennsylvania | Shippensburg, Pennsylvania | Active | |
| **Florida Mu** | April 17, 1999 | Embry–Riddle Aeronautical University, Daytona Beach | Daytona Beach, Florida | Active | |
| Tennessee Zeta | 1999–2013 | Belmont University | Nashville, Tennessee | Inactive | |
| Texas Rho | 1999–2020 | Texas A&M University–Corpus Christi | Corpus Christi, Texas | Inactive | |
| **Pennsylvania Pi** | April 21, 2001 | Robert Morris University | Moon Township, Pennsylvania | Active | |
| **Kansas Eta** | October 12, 2002 – 201x ? | Kansas State University Salina Aerospace and Technology Campus | Salina, Kansas | Active | |
| **Connecticut Alpha** | December 13, 2002 | Central Connecticut State University | New Britain, Connecticut | Active | |
| California Tau | June 8, 2003 – 201x ? | California State University, Stanislaus | Turlock, California | Inactive | |
| Texas Sigma | 2003–201x ? | Schreiner University | Kerrville, Texas | Inactive | |
| **Wisconsin Epsilon** | 2004 | St. Norbert College | De Pere, Wisconsin | Active | |
| Missouri Theta | April 30, 2005 – 2018 | Northwest Missouri State University | Maryville, Missouri | Inactive | |
| Connecticut Beta | November 4, 2005 – 2011 | University of Hartford | West Hartford, Connecticut | Inactive | |
| **Texas Tau** | 2006–201x ? | University of Texas at El Paso | El Paso, Texas | Colony | |
| **Kentucky Iota** | November 17, 2007 | University of Louisville | Louisville, Kentucky | Active | |
| **Maryland Delta** | November 21, 2009 | Johns Hopkins University | Baltimore, Maryland | Active | |
| **California Upsilon** | April 16, 2010 | California State University, Fresno | Fresno, California | Active | |
| **Florida Nu** | January 15, 2011 | Florida Atlantic University | Boca Raton, Florida | Active | |
| **New York Kappa** | February 12, 2011 | Hofstra University | Hempstead, New York | Active | |
| **New Jersey Beta** | November 12, 2011 – 201x ? | Princeton University | Princeton, New Jersey | Active | |
| **Massachusetts Epsilon** | February 4, 2012 | Northeastern University | Boston, Massachusetts | Active | |
| New Mexico Beta | February 11, 2012 – 201x ? | New Mexico State University | Las Cruces, New Mexico | Inactive | |
| **Pennsylvania Rho** | October 26, 2013 | Carnegie Mellon University | Pittsburgh, Pennsylvania | Active | |
| **Ohio Xi** | February 1, 2014 | Otterbein University | Westerville, Ohio | Active | |
| **California Phi** | March 9, 2014 | Chapman University | Orange, California | Active | |
| Iowa Delta | October 28, 1961 – 2009; 2020-2025 | Drake University | Des Moines, Iowa | Inactive | (Note: Chapter formed from Phi Delta Delta (local), established in 1957.) |
| **California Chi** | November 22, 2014 | University of San Francisco | San Francisco, California, | Active | |
| Indiana Mu | March 7, 2015 | Indiana University–Purdue University Indianapolis | Indianapolis, Indiana | Inactive | |
| **North Carolina Epsilon** | March 21, 2015 | University of North Carolina at Charlotte | Charlotte, North Carolina | Active | |
| **North Carolina Zeta** | April 17, 2015 | Campbell University | Buies Creek, North Carolina | Active | |
| **West Virginia Gamma** | 2015 | West Liberty University | West Liberty, West Virginia | Active | (Note: Chapter formed from Delta Zeta Pi (local), established in 2005.) |
| **Missouri Iota** | October 24, 2015 | Lindenwood University | St. Charles, Missouri | Active | |
| **California Psi** | November 21, 2015 | Loyola Marymount University | Los Angeles, California | Active | |
| **Florida Xi** | 2015 | Florida Gulf Coast University | Fort Myers, Florida | Active | |
| **New York Lambda** | 2016 | St. John's University | New York City, New York | Active | |
| **Tennessee Eta** | 2016 | Middle Tennessee State University | Murfreesboro, Tennessee | Active | |
| **Connecticut Gamma** | November 12, 2016 | University of Connecticut | Storrs, Connecticut | Active | |
| **Michigan Zeta** | December 10, 2016 | Central Michigan University | Mount Pleasant, Michigan | Active | |
| **Texas Upsilon** | 2017 | University of Texas at Dallas | Richardson, Texas | Active | |
| **Georgia Eta** | April 29, 2017 | University of West Georgia | Carrollton, Georgia | Active | |
| **New Jersey Gamma** | December 9, 2017 | Seton Hall University | South Orange, New Jersey | Active | |
| **New Jersey Delta** | March 30, 2018 | Stockton University | Galloway Township, New Jersey | Active | |
| District of Columbia Alpha | April 21, 2018 – 2021 | George Washington University | Washington, D.C. | Inactive | |
| **Florida Omicron** | October 27, 2018 | Nova Southeastern University | Davie, Florida | Active | |
| **Virginia Iota** | November 17, 2018 | Old Dominion University | Norfolk, Virginia | Active | |
| **Georgia Theta** | 2019 | Augusta University | Augusta, Georgia | Active | |
| **Virginia Kappa** | 2019 | Radford University | Radford, Virginia | Active | |
| **Pennsylvania Sigma** | May 4, 2019 | Millersville University of Pennsylvania | Millersville, Pennsylvania | Active | |
| **Wisconsin Zeta** | May 11, 2019 | University of Wisconsin–Whitewater | Whitewater, Wisconsin | Active | |
| **Kansas Theta** | 2020 | Ottawa University, Kansas | Ottawa, Kansas | Active | |
| **Georgia Iota** | March 6, 2020 | University of North Georgia | Dahlonega, Georgia | Active | |
| **North Dakota Beta** | November 6, 2020 | North Dakota State University | Fargo, North Dakota | Active | |
| **California Omega** | April 10, 2021 | Santa Clara University | Santa Clara, California | Active | |
| **Arkansas Beta** | April 30, 2021 | Arkansas State University | Jonesboro, Arkansas | Active | |
| **British Columbia Gamma** | 2022 | University of British Columbia Okanagan | Kelowna, British Columbia, Canada | Active | |
| **North Carolina Eta** | 2022 | Appalachian State University | Boone, North Carolina | Active | |
| **Massachusetts Eta** | November 9, 2022 | Babson College | Wellesley, Massachusetts | Active | |
| **Louisiana Epsilon** | December 10, 2022 | Louisiana Tech University | Ruston, Louisiana | Active | |
| **Michigan Eta** | February 18, 2023 | Western Michigan University | Kalamazoo, Michigan | Active | |
| **Oklahoma Epsilon** | February 25, 2023 | Rogers State University | Claremore, Oklahoma | Active | |
| **Virginia Lambda** | November 19, 2023 | George Mason University | Fairfax, Virginia | Active | |
| **Connecticut Delta** | 2024 | Eastern Connecticut State University | Willimantic, Connecticut | Active | |
| **Tennessee Theta** | 2024 | East Tennessee State University | Johnson City, Tennessee | Active | |
| **Idaho Beta** | | Boise State University | Boise, Idaho | Colony | (Note: Colony was established in 2023.) |
| **Michigan Theta** | 2024 | Grand Valley State University | Allendale, Michigan | Active | |
| **Michigan Iota** | November 2025 | Michigan Tech | Houghton, Michigan | Active | |
| **Virginia Mu** | April 18, 2026 | James Madison University | Harrisonburg, Virginia | Active | |
| **Michigan Kappa** | 2025 | Eastern Michigan University | Ypsilanti, Michigan | Colony | |
