= Tennessee House of Representatives 66th district =

State legislative district in Tennessee

Tennessee's 66th State House of Representatives district
- Map of Tennessee House districts with the 66th District shaded in red
Representative
Sabi "Doc" Kumar; R–Springfield
- Demographics: 78.7% White; 7.2% Black; 10% Hispanic; 0.7% Asian; 0.3% Other; 2.9% Multiracial
- Population (2026): 81,520

Tennessee House of Representatives 66th district is one of the 99 legislative districts in the Tennessee House of Representatives. The district lies entirely within Robertson County, Tennessee. It includes the city of Springfield, and the towns of Greenbrier, and Coopertown, as well as much of White House. It has been represented by Sabi Kumar since 2015.

== Demographics ==
The World Population Review estimates the district's population as 81,520 as of 2026.

- 78.7% of the district is White
- 7.2% of the district is African-American
- 10% of the district is Hispanic
- 0.7% of the district is Asian
- 2.9% of the district is Two or more races
- 0.3% of the district is Other

== History ==
The 88th Tennessee General Assembly was the first in which all districts were assigned numbers. At the constitution of the district, it was made up of Cheatham and Robertson counties. From the 103rd GA, it has been part of all of Robertson County.

== Representative ==
Representative	Party	Years of service	General Assembly	Hometown
Sabi "Doc" Kumar	Republican	2015-present	109th-114th	Springfield
Joshua G. Evans	Republican	2009-2014	106th-108th	Greenbrier
Robert T. Bibb	Democratic	2007-2008	105th	Springfield
Eugene E. Davidson	Democratic	1975-2006	89th-104th	Adams

== Elections ==
=== 2024 ===
2024 Tennessee House of Representatives District 66 Election
Party	Candidate	Votes	%
Republican	Sabi "Doc" Kumar (inc.)	23,760	73.02%
Democratic	Elizabeth Webb	6,152	18.91%
Independent	Kevin Mead	2,626	8.07%
Total votes		32,538	100.00
Republican hold			

=== 2022 ===
Tennessee House of Representatives District 66 general election, 2022
Party	Candidate	Votes	%
Republican	Sabi "Doc" Kumar (incumbent)	18,484	100.00%
Total votes		14,554	100.00%
Republican hold			

=== 2020 ===
Tennessee House of Representatives District 66 General Election, 2020
Party	Candidate	Votes	%
Republican	Sabi Kumar	23,348	77.60%
Democratic	Jarvus M. Turnley	6,740	22.40%
Total votes		30,088	100.00%
Republican hold			

=== 2018 ===
2018 Tennessee House of Representatives District 66 general election
Party	Candidate	Votes	%
Republican	Sabi "Doc" Kumar	16,727	72.02%
Democratic	Larry Proffitt	5,721	24.63%
Independent	David W. Ross	776	3.34%
Total votes		23,224	100.00%
Republican hold			

=== 2016 ===
2016 Tennessee House of Representatives District 66 general election
Party	Candidate	Votes	%
Republican	Sabi "Doc" Kumar	18,432	73.67%
Democratic	Larry Proffitt	6,589	26.33%
Total votes		25,021	100.00%
Republican hold			

=== 2014 ===
2014 Tennessee House of Representatives District 66 general election
Party	Candidate	Votes	%
Republican	Sabi "Doc" Kumar	11,181	100.00%
Total votes		11,181	100.00%
Republican hold			

=== 2012 ===
2012 Tennessee House of Representatives District 66 general election
Party	Candidate	Votes	%
Republican	Joshua G. Evans	18,466	100.00%
Total votes		18,466	100.00%
Republican hold			

=== 2010 ===
2010 Tennessee House of Representatives District 66 general election
Party	Candidate	Votes	%
Republican	Joshua G. Evans	10,941	61.69%
Democratic	Billy Paul Carneal	6,794	38.31%
Total votes		17,735	100.00%
Republican hold			

=== 2008 ===
2008 Tennessee House of Representatives District 66 general election
Party	Candidate	Votes	%
Republican	Joshua G. Evans	13,983	52.43%
Democratic	Robert T. "Bob" Bibb	12,688	47.57%
Total votes		26,671	100.00%
Republican gain from Democratic			

=== 2006 ===
2006 Tennessee House of Representatives District 66 general election
Party	Candidate	Votes	%
Democratic	Robert T. "Bob" Bibb	8,622	50.49%
Republican	Joshua G. Evans	8,453	49.51%
Total votes		17,075	100.00%
Democratic hold			

=== 2004 ===
2004 Tennessee House of Representatives District 66 general election
Party	Candidate	Votes	%
Democratic	Eugene E. "Gene" Davidson	12,785	53.96%
Republican	Chris Atkins	10,907	46.04%
Total votes		23,692	100.00%
Democratic hold			

=== 2002 ===
2002 Tennessee House of Representatives District 66 general election
Party	Candidate	Votes	%
Democratic	Eugene E. "Gene" Davidson	9,251	55.98%
Republican	Chris Atkins	7,276	44.02%
Total votes		16,527	100.00%
Democratic hold			

=== 2000 ===
2000 Tennessee House of Representatives District 66 general election
Party	Candidate	Votes	%
Democratic	Eugene E. "Gene" Davidson	13,308	59.12%
Republican	Marie O. Mobley	9,203	40.88%
Total votes		22,511	100.00%
Democratic hold			
