= Thomas Kilgore =

American settler (1715–1823)

- Born: 1715; Virginia
- Died: 1823 (aged 108) (Note: Kilgore's age has been disputed by historians.); Tennessee
- Resting place: Villines Cemetery, Cross Plains
- Spouse: Lydia Yates
- Parent: Robert Kilgore

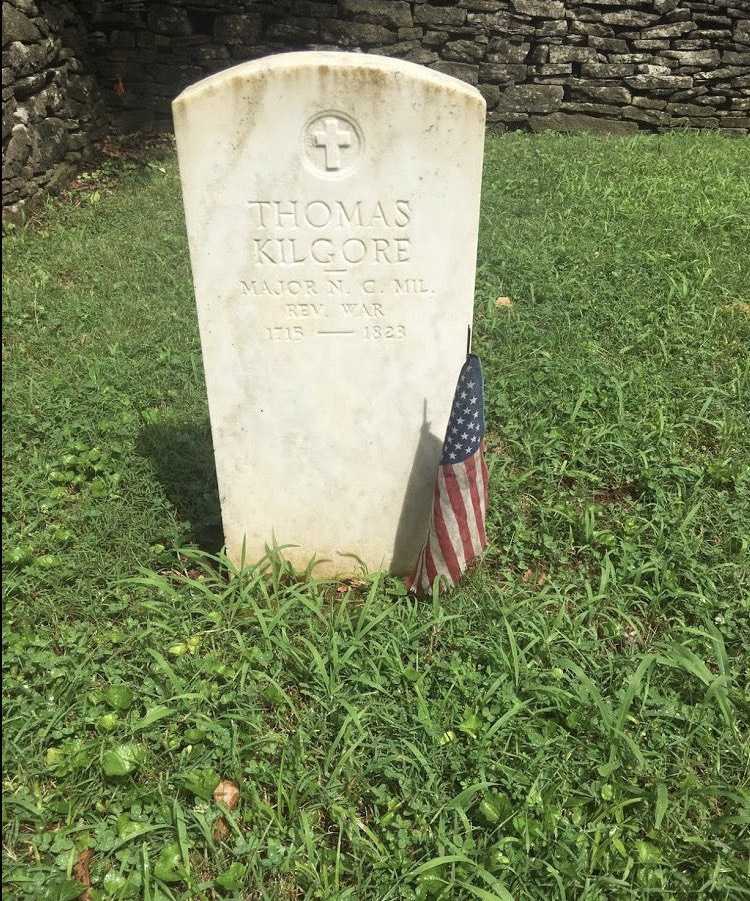
Thomas Kilgore Headstone - Found at the Villines Cemetery in Cross Plains.

Thomas Kilgore (1715–1823) was an American frontiersman and Revolutionary War veteran. He was the founder of Cross Plains, Tennessee, and the first European settler in Robertson County, Tennessee, arriving in the area in 1778.

Thomas Kilgore was born in 1715 in Virginia. Kilgore served in the American Revolutionary War, and many have claimed that he fought in the Battle of Kings Mountain along with other members of his family. However historians have disputed this claim, saying that Kilgore served as the Quartermaster for the Commission surveying the Military District for North Carolina Revolutionary War soldiers.

In the 1770s, the Legislature of North Carolina passed a preemption law granting 640 acres of land in western North Carolina to settlers aged 21 or older provided the settlement was made prior to June 1, 1780. The preemption law motivated Kilgore to claim land, and in 1778, he began his journey west with some ammunition, salt, and a few grains of corn. Kilgore used the sun and North Star as his guide, and eventually reached Bledsoe's Lick.

After resting at Bledsoe's Lick for several days, Kilgore traveled 25 miles west where he found a cave next to the middle fork of the Red River, which he used as a shelter because of its protection against attacks from local Indian tribes. Kilgore then used the grains of corn that he had brought with him to plant a few hills of the crop. In the fall, the corn had fully grown, so Kilgore returned to eastern North Carolina with three ears of corn and the title to his land was confirmed.

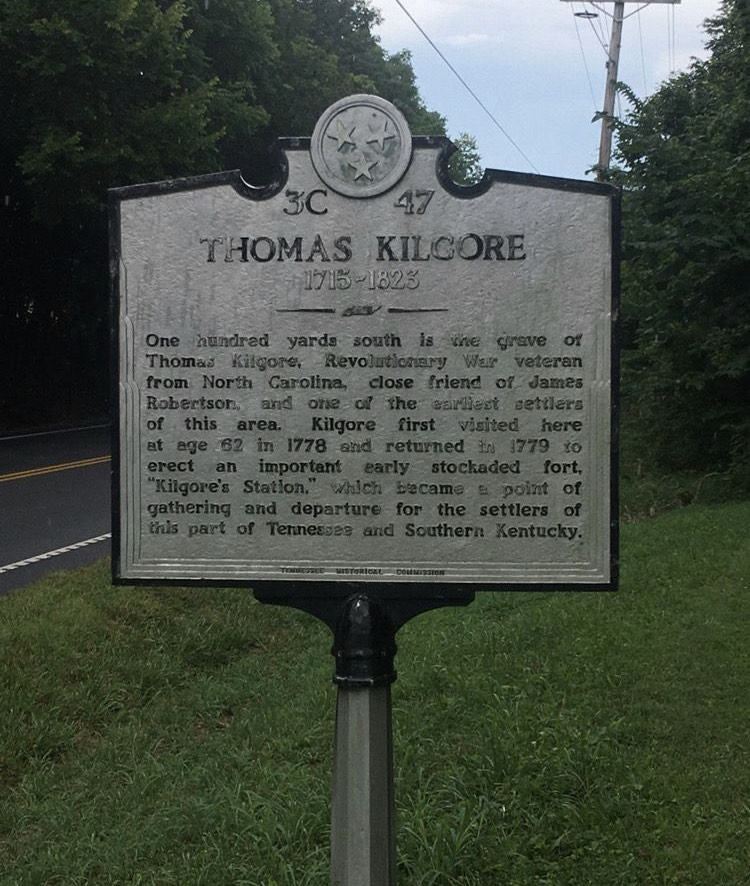
Thomas Kilgore Historical Sign - Found outside of the Villines Cemetery in Cross Plains.

Kilgore returned to his settlement in the spring of 1779, along with several other families, and then built a fort which became known as Kilgore Station. Kilgore lived in Tennessee with his wife, Lydia Yates, and their son, Thomas Kilgore Jr. Thomas Kilgore died in 1823 at the age of 108 after he became drenched and caught a chill during a trip to Gallatin, Tennessee.

In 2007, Kilgore Park, named for Thomas, opened in Cross Plains.
