= Sabi "Doc" Kumar =

American surgeon and politician (born 1947)

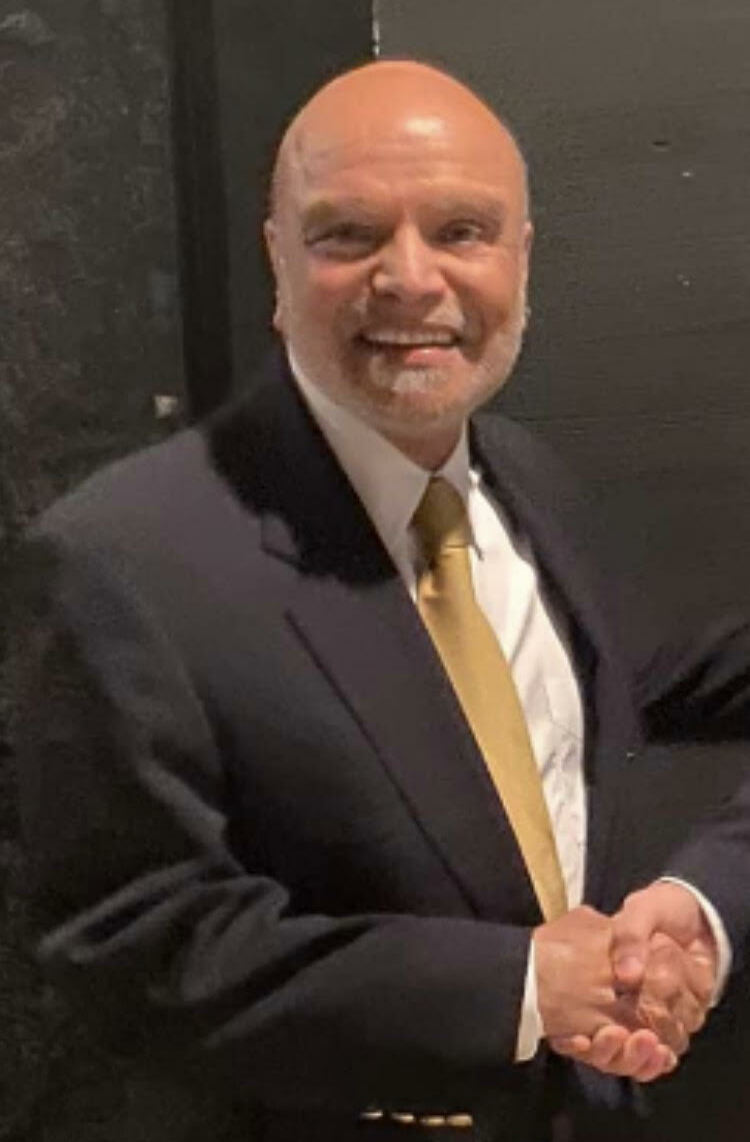
- Kumar in 2023

Member of the Tennessee House of Representatives from the 66th district
- Incumbent
- Assumed office January 13, 2015
- Preceded by: Joshua Evans

Personal details
- Born: July 14, 1947 (age 79) Amritsar, British India
- Party: Republican
- Spouse: Linda Kumar
- Children: 1
- Education: Amritsar Medical College
- Website: House website Campaign website

Sarbjeet S. (Sabi Doc) Kumar (born July 14, 1947) is an Indian American politician, writer, and physician. Since 2015, Kumar, a retired general and vascular surgeon, has served as a Republican member of the Tennessee House of Representatives from the 66th district, encompassing Robertson County. He chairs the House Insurance Committee and is the first Indian American to be elected to the Tennessee State House.

== Early life and career ==
Kumar immigrated to the United States from India in 1970. He completed his medical residency and fellowship in Miami, Florida, at Mount Sinai Medical Center from 1971 to 1977. Afterward, he moved to Springfield, Tennessee, where he continued his career as a surgeon.

Kumar holds five patents, including one for a clamp device used in gallbladder surgery.

== Tennessee House of Representatives (2015–present) ==
=== Elections ===
In 2014, Kumar ran for the Tennessee House of Representatives' 66th district after incumbent Representative Joshua Evans decided to run for the Tennessee Senate. Running against four other candidates, Kumar won the Republican primary with 44% of the vote. He went on to win the general election unopposed. Kumar was re-elected in 2016, 2018, 2020, 2022, and 2024, and 2026.

=== Tenure ===
In 2023, Kumar supported a resolution to expel three Democratic lawmakers from the legislature for violating decorum rules during a pro-gun control protest in the State Capitol Building. The expulsion was widely characterized as unprecedented. Kumar claimed that prior to the expulsion vote, Democrat Justin Jones pointed a finger in his face, accused him of putting a "brown face to white supremacy," and told him, "Kumar, they will never accept you."

Kumar ran as a pledged delegate for Nikki Haley in the 2024 Tennessee Republican presidential primary.

In 2025, Kumar sponsored "Savanna's Law," a bill requiring the state to create a registry for domestic violence offenders. The legislation passed through the Tennessee government, eventually taking effect in January 2026.

=== Committees ===
In the 2015 legislative session, Kumar served on the following committees: Health Committee and Education Committee.

In the 2017 legislative session, Kumar served on the following committees: Education Instruction and Programs and Health (vice chair).

In the 2019–2020 legislative session, Kumar served on the following committees: Finance, Ways and Means Committee and the Health Committee.

In the 2021–2022 legislative session, Kumar served on the following committees: Calendar and Rules Committee, Health Committee, and the Insurance Committee (chair).

== Personal life ==
Kumar lives in Springfield, Tennessee, with his wife Linda, a registered nurse. Their daughter Nina is an attorney in Nashville. Prior to Kumar's retirement from medical practice, he worked as a general and vascular surgeon at NorthCrest Medical Center in Springfield. He is a Methodist.
