= Thomas Drugs =

- U.S. National Register of Historic Places
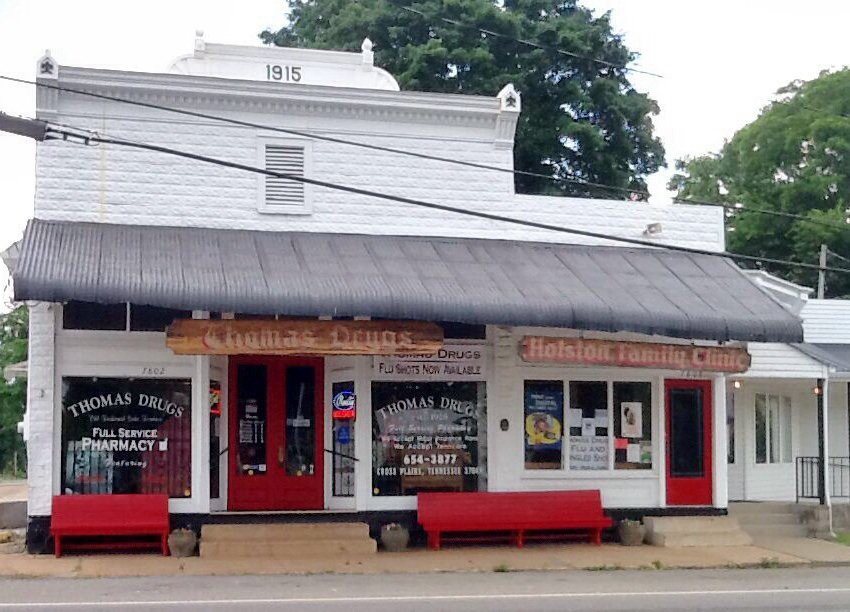
- Thomas Drugs in 2014

- Location within Tennessee Location within the United States
- Location: 7802 State Route 25, E, Cross Plains, Tennessee
- Built: 1915; 111 years ago
- NRHP reference No.: 93001189
- Added to NRHP: November 4, 1993

Thomas Drugs is a drug store located in Cross Plains, Tennessee. The building was constructed in 1915 and originally operated as a general store until it was purchased by the Thomas Family. The pharmacy opened in 1930. In 1976, Dan Green purchased the store. In January 1991, Thomas Drugs began serving food items at its soda fountain. Thomas Drugs has been listed on the National Register of Historic Places since November 4, 1993.
