= Holmansville, Tennessee =

Unincorporated community

Coordinates: 36°31′07″N 87°04′47″W

Holmansville is an unincorporated community in Robertson County, Tennessee, in the United States.
