= Joshua Evans (Tennessee politician) =

American politician (born 1983)

Member of the Tennessee House of Representatives from the 66th district
- In office January 13, 2009 – January 13, 2015
- Preceded by: Robert Bibb
- Succeeded by: Sabi "Doc" Kumar

Personal details
- Born: June 27, 1983 (age 43) McComb, Mississippi, U.S.
- Party: Republican
- Education: Middle Tennessee State University (BS)
- Website: House website

Joshua G. Evans (born June 27, 1983) is an American politician and a former Republican member of the Tennessee House of Representatives representing District 66, from 2009 to 2015. He unsuccessfully ran for the Tennessee Senate's 21st District in 2014.

== Education ==
Evans graduated from Greenbrier High School in 2001. He earned his BS in mass communication from Middle Tennessee State University.

== Career ==
=== Tennessee House of Representatives ===
- 2012 Evans was challenged in the August 2, 2012 Republican Primary, winning with 4,286 votes (71.4%), and was unopposed for the November 6, 2012 General election, winning with 18,466 votes.
- 2006 When District 66 incumbent Democratic Representative Gene Davidson retired and left the seat open, Evans ran in the August 3, 2006 Republican Primary, winning with 2,114 votes (52.6%), but lost the November 7, 2006 General election to Democratic nominee Bob Bibb.
- 2008 Evans and Representative Bibb were both unopposed for their August 7, 2008 primaries, setting up a rematch; Evans won the November 4, 2008 General election with 13,983 votes (52.4%) against Representative Bibb.
- 2010 Evans was unopposed for the August 5, 2010 Republican Primary, winning with 7,039 votes, and won the November 2, 2010 General election with 10,941 votes (61.7%) against Democratic nominee Billy Paul Carneal.

=== Robertson County politics ===
After Carol Dugger resigned from the Robertson County Commission in April 2017, Evans sought to fill the vacancy. He was one of two candidates who requested to fill the seat. Evans secured the seat with a 13-7-3 vote from the commission. In January 2018, Evans announced his candidacy in the Robertson County mayoral election to succeed term-limited mayor Howard Bradley. He was defeated by Billy Vogle in the general election. Evans ran again for mayor in 2022, but lost to incumbent Billy Vogle.
