= Ashburn, Tennessee =

Unincorporated community in Tennessee, US

Coordinates: 36°37′16″N 86°49′43″W

Ashburn is an unincorporated community in Robertson County, Tennessee, in the United States.
