= Stroudville, Tennessee =

- Unincorporated community
- Location within Tennessee Location within the United States
- Coordinates: 36°28′56″N 87°06′27″W
- Country: United States
- State: Tennessee
- County: Robertson
- Elevation: 620 ft (190 m)
- Time zone: UTC-6 (Central (CST))
  - Summer (DST): UTC-5 (CDT)
- Area code: 615

Stroudville is an unincorporated community in Robertson County, Tennessee, in the United States.

== History ==
A post office was established at Stroudsville in 1900, and remained in operation until it was discontinued in 1903.
