= Turnersville, Tennessee =

- Unincorporated community
- Location within Tennessee Location within the United States
- Coordinates: 36°29′16″N 87°02′24″W
- Country: United States
- State: Tennessee
- County: Robertson
- Elevation: 482 ft (147 m)
- Time zone: UTC-6 (Central (CST))
  - Summer (DST): UTC-5 (CDT)
- Area code(s): 615, 629
- GNIS feature ID: 1273091

Turnersville is an unincorporated community in Robertson County, Tennessee, United States.
