= Baggettsville, Tennessee =

Unincorporated community in Tennessee, US

Coordinates: 36°28′36″N 86°43′49″W

Baggettsville is an unincorporated community in Robertson County, Tennessee, in the United States.

== History ==
A post office was established at Baggettsville in 1870, and remained in operation until it was discontinued in 1907. Archer B. Baggett served as postmaster there.
