= Sandy Springs, Tennessee =

Sandy Springs
- Unincorporated community
- Location within Tennessee Location within the United States
- Coordinates: 36°26′52″N 87°00′39″W
- Country: United States
- State: Tennessee
- County: Robertson
- Time zone: UTC-6 (Central (CST))
  - Summer (DST): UTC-5 (CDT)

Sandy Springs is an unincorporated community in Robertson County, Tennessee, in the United States.

Located in the northern part of the state near the Kentucky border, it lies within the Nashville-Davidson–Murfreesboro–Franklin Metropolitan Statistical Area and is characterized by its rural setting with agricultural lands and residential areas. The community features local infrastructure such as Sandy Springs Road, which connects it to nearby towns like Cedar Hill.
