= Hubertville, Tennessee =

Unincorporated community in Tennessee, US

Coordinates: 36°33′20″N 86°48′01″W

Hubertville is an unincorporated community in Robertson County, Tennessee, in the United States.
