= Crunk, Tennessee =

Unincorporated community in Tennessee, US

Crunk
- Unincorporated community
- Location within Tennessee Location within the United States
- Coordinates: 36°25′26″N 86°53′37″W
- Country: United States
- State: Tennessee
- County: Robertson
- Time zone: UTC-6 (Central (CST))
  - Summer (DST): UTC-5 (CDT)

Crunk is an unincorporated community in Robertson County, Tennessee, in the United States. It is located south of Springfield in the rural portion of the county and is part of the Nashville–Davidson–Murfreesboro–Franklin Metropolitan Statistical Area.

== History ==
=== Crunk Family Influence ===
The Crunk family's roots in Tennessee trace back to the late 18th century, with Richard Ira Crunk (born about 1757) and his brother William documented among the earliest settlers in Robertson County during the 1790s. Richard Ira Crunk's son, Richard Crunk (born around 1785 in Virginia), married Mary Polly Huddleston on October 17, 1803, and both the elder and younger Crunks contributed to the pioneer community established between Nashville and Springfield, an area that became known informally as the Crunk community due to the family's prominence. By the early 19th century, Richard and William operated as shoemakers in Springfield, supporting the local economy through skilled trades amid the county's agricultural expansion. .

== Geography ==
The community lies at an elevation of approximately 682 feet (208 m).
