= Neophogen College =

Former private university in Gallatin, Tennessee

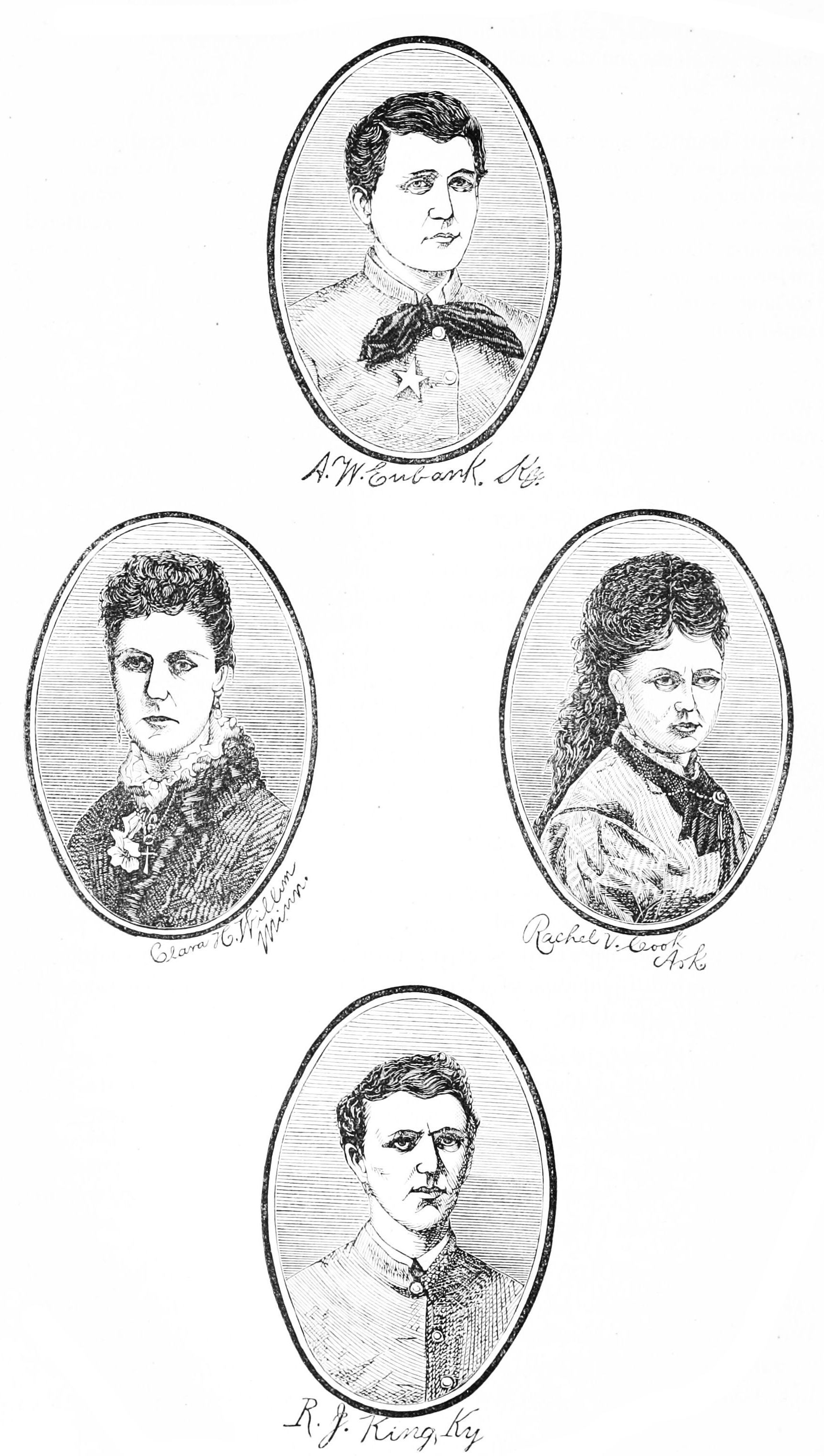
Portraits of honor students from Neophogen published in Popular Science Monthly in 1877

Neophogen College was a private university in Cross Plains and later Gallatin, Tennessee, founded in 1873 by J.M. Walton. The college was noted for an attention to etiquette and English language instruction, for which it was often satirized in other university periodicals such as The Harvard Crimson, Yale Literary Magazine and the Daily Princetonian. The college lost favor with its patrons and was later discontinued at the end of 1878.

Walton first erected a large wood-frame building in Cross Plains, costing $25,000 to build, which soon after was destroyed by fire in 1874. The school then moved to Gallatin, where it would remain until its discontinued in 1878. A stock company immediately helped rebuild the school, this time out of brick. In the first session, 250 students enrolled, 150 whom were from other counties and states. The school's yearly tuition was $100.

Neophogen was known and sometimes ridiculed for its focus on etiquette and English language instruction. A letter addressed to "a freshman at Neophogen" appeared in the Harvard Crimson in 1877, advising:

Be particular in little things; do not throw off your collar because you are warm, nor take off your collar because it has begun to melt. Such small points are too apt to be laughed at at Neophogen as over-refinements. Be careful, yet simple in your dress. A brass collar-button is better than a scarlet necktie. Do not lounge with the men at one end of the room, and never fail to go and talk with the girls when the President asks you. Your knowledge of the world will make you a favorite.

It was also coeducational:

Today, at Neophogen, the chairs of Latin, Greek, Commerce, Agriculture, Horticulture, Phrenology, Physiognomy, Hygiene and Telegraphy are vacant. None can be found to properly fill them, we presume. And now we come to the settlement of a question which is agitating the world at the present day. This proves the extent of our blindness, when we go on in long arguments pro and con for years, wasting time, paper and patience, when, if we should but turn our heads, at our very elbow we find a satisfactory practical solution of the whole difficulty. The question of the present day was co-education; but is so no longer. Neophogen has practically proved that co-education is a glorious existence. Columbia is wrong; Harvard is right. Let Princeton at once take measures to introduce the system here. By all means let us have the girls.
