= Cross Plains, Tennessee =

- City
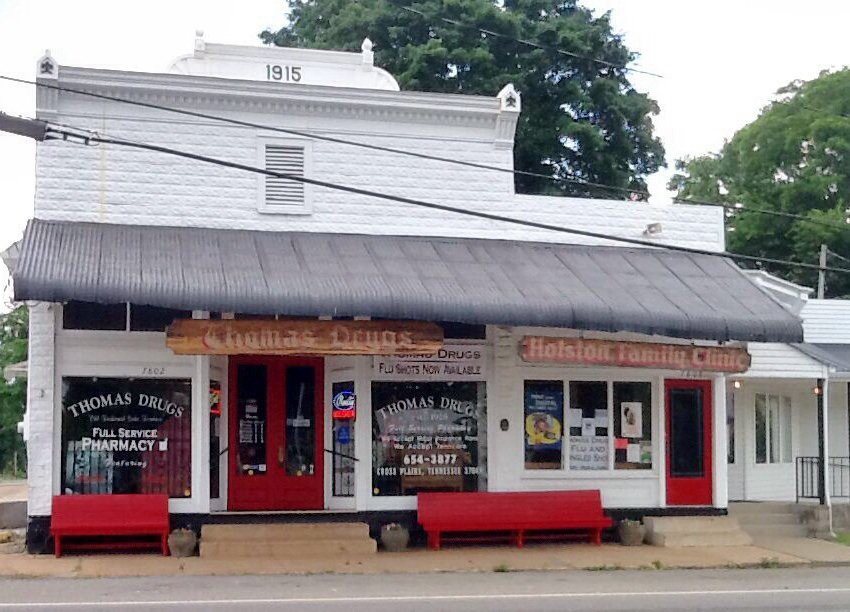
- Thomas Drugs in Cross Plains

- Location of Cross Plains in Robertson County, Tennessee.

- Location within Tennessee Location within the United States
- Coordinates: 36°32′55″N 86°41′46″W
- Country: United States
- State: Tennessee
- County: Robertson

Government
  - Mayor: Barry Faulkner

Area
  - Total: 8.69 sq mi (22.51 km^{2})
  - Land: 8.69 sq mi (22.51 km^{2})
  - Water: 0 sq mi (0.00 km^{2})
- Elevation: 745 ft (227 m)

Population (2020)
  - Total: 1,789
  - Estimate (2024): 1,907 ▲
  - Density: 205.9/sq mi (79.49/km^{2})
- Time zone: UTC-6 (Central (CST))
  - Summer (DST): UTC-5 (CDT)
- ZIP code: 37049
- Area code(s): 615, 629
- FIPS code: 47-18420
- GNIS feature ID: 1306195
- Website: https://crossplainstn.gov/

Cross Plains is a city in Robertson County, Tennessee. The city's population was 1,789 at the 2020 census. Cross Plains was the first area of Robertson County that was settled by European settlers, with the arrival of Thomas Kilgore in 1778.

== History ==
In 1778, American Revolutionary War veteran Thomas Kilgore arrived at the Middle Fork of Red River, three-fourths of a mile west of Cross Plains, making him the first European settler to arrive in Robertson County. Kilgore traveled to this area to claim 640 acres of land, which was guaranteed to settlers who traveled west by the Legislature of North Carolina. Kilgore returned to eastern North Carolina in the fall of 1778, and after the title of his land was confirmed, he traveled back to his settlement with a few other families, and built a stockade which would be known as Kilgore Station. The first building was a double log house erected by William Randolph in 1819. It was also used as a tavern.

In 1873, J.M. Walton established Neophogen College, a private university which operated until 1877. Thomas Drugs opened in 1915; it is one of the oldest establishments in Cross Plains.

In 2004, construction began on "Kilgore Park" located west of East Robertson High School. Construction was completed in 2008. In 2020, the Cross Plains city government announced that they had purchased 148 acres of land on Highway 25 west of Kilgore Park for $1.08 million. City officials stated that the land was purchased for future uses such as an expansion of Kilgore Park, or new schools.

== Geography ==
According to the United States Census Bureau, the city has a total area of 8.3 square miles (21 km^{2}), all land.

=== Transportation ===
Highways

- Interstate 65
- / U.S. Route 31W / Tennessee State Route 41 (Note: Unsigned)
- Tennessee State Route 25

Decommissioned highways

- Tennessee State Route 79

The major east-west route, State Route 25 (SR 25), is a thoroughfare between Springfield and Gallatin. Interstate 65 (I-65) is a major north-south route between Louisville, Kentucky and Nashville. It intersects SR 25 on exit 112. US 31W, the predecessor to I-65, runs east of the latter route parallel to it. It provides an alternate route for local drivers to White House and Portland.

History

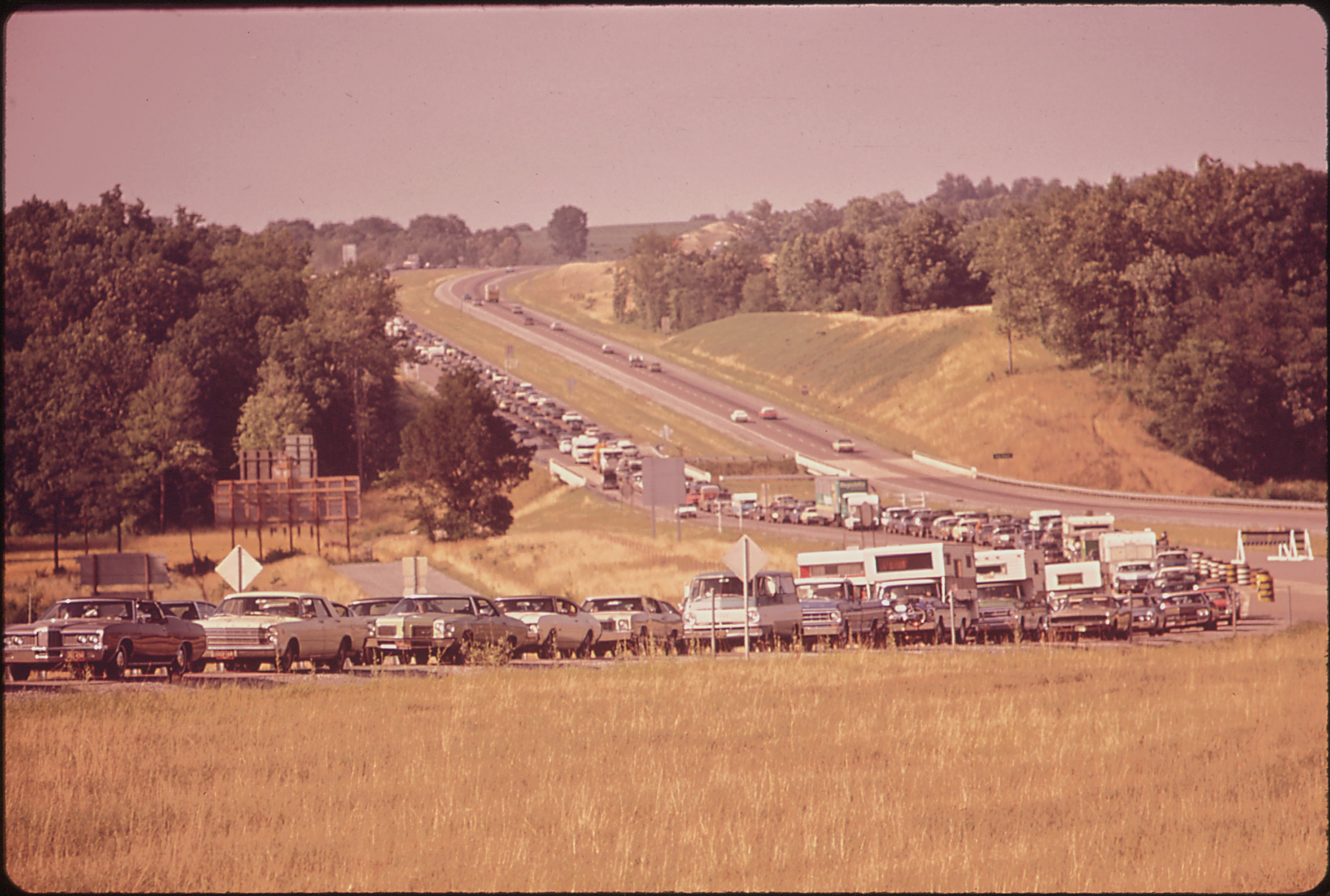
I-65 at the SR 25 interchange in September 1972, looking north.

In the late 19th century, two major stagecoach routes ran through Cross Plains. The Louisville and Nashville Turnpike ran on the eastern end of town on the border of Robertson and Sumner County and the Hopkinsville and Gallatin Road ran through downtown and east toward Gallatin. The first state route to run through the modern Cross Plains area was State Route 79 in the 1920s, it ran on the old Louisville and Nashville Turnpike. State Route 79 was replaced by U.S. Route 31W in November 1926. The second and last state route to be routed through Cross Plains was State Route 25 which was extended west of Gallatin to Cross Plains by 1939. It replaced the Hopkinsville and Gallatin Road. Around 1953, the original curvy routing of US 31W was replaced by a straighter and more direct route. This rerouting abandoned a stone bridge that has been used since at least 1841. Segments of the old road still see use today as simply "Old Highway 31W". Construction on I-65 near Cross Plains began around 1970. By December 1972, the section south of Cross Plains was complete. Beginning in 2021, the section of Interstate 65 became subject to widening to alleviate traffic strains.

== Demographics ==
Historical population
Census	Pop.	Note	%±
1880	101		—
1980	655		—
1990	1,025		56.5%
2000	1,381		34.7%
2010	1,714		24.1%
2020	1,789		4.4%
2024 (est.)	1,907		6.6%

=== 2020 census ===
As of the 2020 census, there was a population of 1,789, with 659 households and 513 families residing in the city.

As of the 2020 census, the median age was 41.6 years; 21.9% of residents were under the age of 18 and 17.2% of residents were 65 years of age or older. For every 100 females there were 105.2 males, and for every 100 females age 18 and over there were 101.6 males age 18 and over.

There were 659 households in Cross Plains, of which 33.4% had children under the age of 18 living in them. Of all households, 55.1% were married-couple households, 17.9% were households with a male householder and no spouse or partner present, and 19.4% were households with a female householder and no spouse or partner present. About 21.0% of all households were made up of individuals and 9.4% had someone living alone who was 65 years of age or older.

There were 701 housing units, of which 6.0% were vacant. The homeowner vacancy rate was 0.9% and the rental vacancy rate was 7.2%.

0.0% of residents lived in urban areas, while 100.0% lived in rural areas.

Racial composition as of the 2020 census
Race	Number	Percent
White	1,546	86.4%
Black or African American	83	4.6%
American Indian and Alaska Native	1	0.1%
Asian	6	0.3%
Native Hawaiian and Other Pacific Islander	0	0.0%
Some other race	28	1.6%
Two or more races	125	7.0%
Hispanic or Latino (of any race)	69	3.9%

=== 2000 census ===
As of the census of 2000, there was a population of 1,381, with 504 households and 400 families residing in the city. The population density was 166.8 inhabitants per square mile (64.4/km^{2}). There were 536 housing units at an average density of 64.7 per square mile (25.0/km^{2}). The racial makeup of the city was 94.06% White, 3.19% African American, 0.22% Native American, 0.14% Asian, 0.14% Pacific Islander, 0.22% from other races, and 2.03% from two or more races. Hispanic or Latino of any race were 1.23% of the population.

There were 504 households, out of which 36.7% had children under the age of 18 living with them, 63.1% were married couples living together, 11.1% had a female householder with no husband present, and 20.6% were non-families. 16.5% of all households were made up of individuals, and 6.0% had someone living alone who was 65 years of age or older. The average household size was 2.74 and the average family size was 3.06.

In the city, the population was spread out, with 27.4% under the age of 18, 7.0% from 18 to 24, 30.1% from 25 to 44, 26.2% from 45 to 64, and 9.3% who were 65 years of age or older. The median age was 37 years. For every 100 females, there were 106.7 males. For every 100 females age 18 and over, there were 101.4 males.

The median income for a household in the city was $42,279, and the median income for a family was $47,143. Males had a median income of $37,424 versus $24,792 for females. The per capita income for the city was $17,792. About 8.1% of families and 12.0% of the population were below the poverty line, including 17.9% of those under age 18 and 20.6% of those age 65 or over.
