= Milldale, Tennessee =

Unincorporated community in Tennessee, US

Coordinates: 36°35′24″N 86°45′49″W

Milldale is an unincorporated community in Robertson County, Tennessee, in the United States.
