= Robertson County, Tennessee =

County in Tennessee, United States

- County
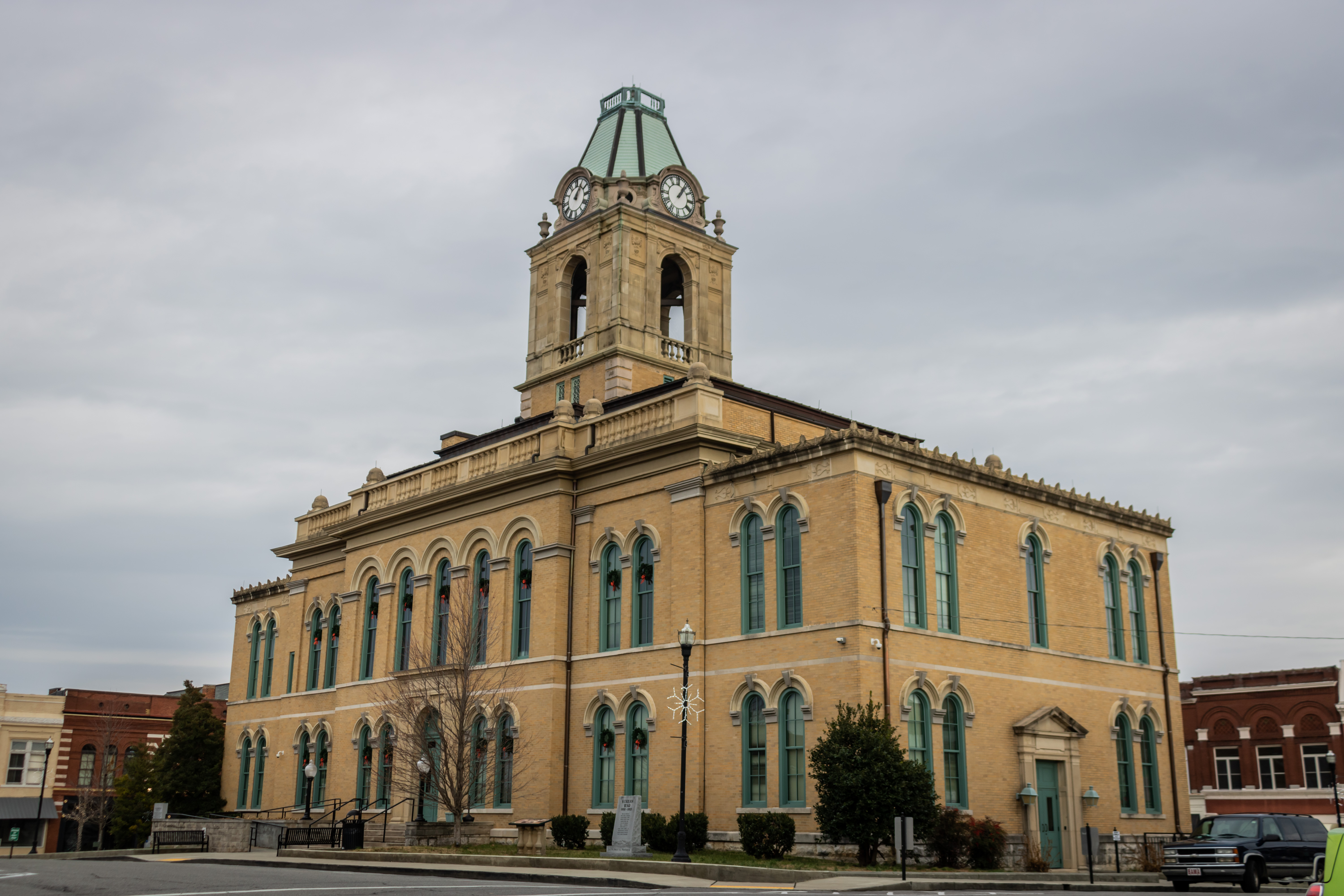
- Robertson County Courthouse in Springfield

- Seal

- Location within the U.S. state of Tennessee
- Coordinates: 36°32′N 86°52′W
- Country: United States
- State: Tennessee
- Founded: April 9, 1796; 230 years ago
- Named for: James Robertson
- Seat: Springfield
- Largest city: Springfield

Government
  - Mayor: Keith Hoover (R)

Area
  - Total: 476 sq mi (1,230 km^{2})
  - Land: 476 sq mi (1,230 km^{2})
  - Water: 0.2 sq mi (0.52 km^{2}) 0.04%

Population (2020)
  - Total: 72,803
  - Estimate (2025): 80,175 ▲
  - Density: 153/sq mi (59.1/km^{2})
- Time zone: UTC−6 (Central)
  - Summer (DST): UTC−5 (CDT)
- Area code: 615, 629
- Congressional district: 7th
- Website: robertsoncountytn.gov

Robertson County is a county located on the central northern border of Tennessee in the United States. As of the 2020 United States census, the population was 72,803. Its seat of government is Springfield. The county was named for James Robertson, an explorer, founder of Nashville, and a state senator, who was often called the "Father of Middle Tennessee." Robertson County is a component of the Nashville-Davidson–Murfreesboro–Franklin, TN Metropolitan Statistical Area.

== History ==
This was part of the Miro District (also spelled Mero), named after the Spanish Governor Esteban Rodríguez Miró of what was then Louisiana on the west side of the Mississippi River. Miró had served with Spanish troops that assisted the Americans during their war for independence. James Robertson, the explorer for whom this county was named, was trying to create an alliance with Miró that would allow free movement on the Mississippi River (which Spain controlled) to settlers on the Cumberland frontier. Before statehood, this territory was known as Tennessee County.

Thomas Kilgore, the first European settler in Robertson County, arrived in 1778 to establish a settlement in what is now present-day Cross Plains. Robertson County was organized in 1796, at the same time as Montgomery County, which had also been part of the Miro district. The county seat, Springfield, Tennessee, was laid out in 1798. Although initially, most settlers did not hold slaves, by the 1820s planters began to cultivate tobacco, a commodity crop that was labor-intensive and depended on enslaved African Americans. The planters bought slaves to work their plantations, as well as to care for the livestock they bred—Thoroughbred horses and cattle.

By the time of the Civil War, African Americans comprised about one-quarter of the area's population, typical for Middle Tennessee, where tobacco and hemp were commodity crops. During the Civil War, Tennessee was occupied by the Union from 1862, which led to a breakdown in social organization in Middle Tennessee.

By 1910 the county's population was 25,466, including 6,492 black citizens, who continued to make up one-quarter of the total. Most of the residents were still involved in farm work, and tobacco was the primary commodity crop, but agricultural mechanization was reducing the need for laborers. White Democrats had tried to restrict black voting; other southern states had excluded blacks from the political process. Many African Americans left rural Robertson County and other parts of Tennessee in the Great Migration to northern and midwestern cities for employment and social freedom. Combined with the later in-migration of whites to the county, by the early 21st century, African Americans comprised less than 10 percent of the county population. They live chiefly in its larger towns.

== Geography ==
Interactive map of Robertson County

According to the U.S. Census Bureau, the county has a total area of 476 square miles (1,230 km^{2}), of which 476 square miles (1,230 km^{2}) is land and 0.2 square miles (0.52 km^{2}) (0.04%) is water.

=== Adjacent counties ===
- Logan County, Kentucky (north)
- Simpson County, Kentucky (northeast)
- Sumner County (east)
- Davidson County (south)
- Cheatham County (southwest)
- Montgomery County (west)
- Todd County, Kentucky (northwest)

=== State protected areas ===
- Cedar Hill Swamp Wildlife Management Area
- Port Royal State Park (part)

== Demographics ==
Historical population
Census	Pop.	Note	%±
1800	4,280		—
1810	7,270		69.9%
1820	9,938		36.7%
1830	13,372		34.6%
1840	13,801		3.2%
1850	16,145		17.0%
1860	15,265		−5.5%
1870	16,166		5.9%
1880	18,861		16.7%
1890	20,078		6.5%
1900	25,029		24.7%
1910	25,466		1.7%
1920	25,621		0.6%
1930	28,191		10.0%
1940	29,046		3.0%
1950	27,024		−7.0%
1960	27,335		1.2%
1970	29,102		6.5%
1980	37,021		27.2%
1990	41,494		12.1%
2000	54,433		31.2%
2010	66,238		21.7%
2020	72,803		9.9%
2025 (est.)	80,175	▲	10.1%
U.S. Decennial Census; 1790–1960 1900–1990; 1990–2000 2010–2014

=== Racial and ethnic composition ===
Robertson County, Tennessee – Racial and ethnic composition Note: the US Census treats Hispanic/Latino as an ethnic category. This table excludes Latinos from the racial categories and assigns them to a separate category. Hispanics/Latinos may be of any race.
Race / ethnicity (NH = Non-Hispanic)	Pop 1980	Pop 1990	Pop 2000	Pop 2010	Pop 2020	% 1980	% 1990	% 2000	% 2010	% 2020
White alone (NH)	31,849	36,672	47,644	56,159	57,049	86.03%	88.38%	87.53%	84.73%	78.36%
Black or African American alone (NH)	4,891	4,536	4,631	4,877	5,091	13.21%	10.93%	8.51%	7.36%	6.99%
Native American or Alaska Native alone (NH)	29	59	124	190	139	0.08%	0.14%	0.23%	0.29%	0.19%
Asian alone (NH)	32	42	169	323	447	0.09%	0.10%	0.31%	0.49%	0.61%
Native Hawaiian or Pacific Islander alone (NH)	x	x	7	17	21	x	x	0.01%	0.03%	0.03%
Other race alone (NH)	0	12	39	49	246	0.00%	0.03%	0.07%	0.07%	0.34%
Mixed race or Multiracial (NH)	x	x	372	765	2,932	x	x	0.68%	1.15%	4.03%
Hispanic or Latino (any race)	220	173	1,447	3,903	6,878	0.59%	0.42%	2.66%	5.89%	9.45%
Total	37,021	41,494	54,433	66,283	72,803	100.00%	100.00%	100.00%	100.00%	100.00%

=== 2020 census ===
As of the 2020 census, there were 72,803 people, 26,885 households, and 20,378 families residing in the county. The median age was 39.8 years; 23.7% of residents were under the age of 18 and 15.7% of residents were 65 years of age or older, with 97.8 males for every 100 females overall and 96.0 males for every 100 females age 18 and over.

The racial makeup of the county was 80.3% White, 7.1% Black or African American, 0.5% American Indian and Alaska Native, 0.6% Asian, <0.1% Native Hawaiian and Pacific Islander, 5.0% from some other race, and 6.4% from two or more races. Hispanic or Latino residents of any race comprised 9.4% of the population.

47.0% of residents lived in urban areas, while 53.0% lived in rural areas.

There were 26,885 households in the county, of which 34.4% had children under the age of 18 living in them. Of all households, 54.7% were married-couple households, 15.6% were households with a male householder and no spouse or partner present, and 23.3% were households with a female householder and no spouse or partner present. About 21.6% of all households were made up of individuals and 9.5% had someone living alone who was 65 years of age or older.

There were 28,459 housing units, of which 5.5% were vacant. Among occupied housing units, 75.0% were owner-occupied and 25.0% were renter-occupied. The homeowner vacancy rate was 1.2% and the rental vacancy rate was 5.5%.

=== 2000 census ===
As of the census of 2000, there were 54,433 people, 19,906 households, and 15,447 families residing in the county. The population density was 114 people per square mile (44 people/km^{2}). There were 20,995 housing units at an average density of 44 per square mile (17/km^{2}). The racial makeup of the county was 89.13% White, 8.62% Black or African American, 0.28% Native American, 0.31% Asian, 0.02% Pacific Islander, 0.83% from other races, and 0.80% from two or more races. 2.66% of the population were Hispanic or Latino of any race.

In 2005 the racial makeup of the county was 85.4% non-Hispanic whites, 8.3% African Americans, and 5.3% Latinos.

There were 19,906 households, out of which 37.40% had children under the age of 18 living with them, 61.90% were married couples living together, 11.20% had a female householder with no husband present, and 22.40% were non-families. 18.60% of all households were made up of individuals, and 7.50% had someone living alone who was 65 years of age or older. The average household size was 2.71 and the average family size was 3.06.

In the county, the population was spread out, with 26.80% under the age of 18, 8.50% from 18 to 24, 31.40% from 25 to 44, 22.50% from 45 to 64, and 10.80% who were 65 years of age or older. The median age was 35 years. For every 100 females, there were 98.80 males. For every 100 females age 18 and over, there were 95.70 males.

The median income for a household in the county was $43,174, and the median income for a family was $49,412. Males had a median income of $34,895 versus $24,086 for females. The per capita income for the county was $19,054. About 6.40% of families and 9.00% of the population were below the poverty line, including 10.90% of those under age 18 and 13.10% of those aged 65 or over.

== Communities ==
=== Cities ===
- Adams
- Cedar Hill
- Cross Plains
- Greenbrier
- Millersville (primarily in Sumner County)
- Orlinda
- Portland (primarily in Sumner County)
- Ridgetop (partly in Davidson County)
- Springfield (county seat)
- White House (partly in Sumner County)

=== Towns ===
- Coopertown

=== Hamlets ===
- Calistia
- Jernigan Town

=== Unincorporated communities ===
- Ashburn
- Baggettsville
- Barren Plains
- Bethlehem (Robertson County)
- Courtland
- Crunk
- Holmansville
- Hubertville
- Milldale
- Port Royal (partial Montgomery County)
- Sandy Springs
- Stroudville
- Turnersville
- Youngville

== Transportation ==
Highways

Interstate Highways

- Interstate 65
- Interstate 24

United States Numbered Highways

- U.S. Route 31W
- U.S. Route 41
- U.S. Route 41 Alternate
- U.S. Route 431

Tennessee State Routes

- Tennessee State Route 11 (Note: Unsigned companion route of US 41)
- Tennessee State Route 25
- Tennessee State Route 41 (Note: Unsigned companion route of US 31W)
- Tennessee State Route 49
- Tennessee State Route 52
- Tennessee State Route 65 (Note: Unsigned companion route of US 431)
- / Tennessee State Route 76 (Note: From Springfield to Adams, SR 76 runs concurrently with US 41 as an unsigned route)
- Tennessee State Route 109
- Tennessee State Route 112 (Note: Unsigned companion route of US 41A)
- Tennessee State Route 161
- Tennessee State Route 256
- Tennessee State Route 257

Interstate 65 runs along the eastern border of the county for about 20 miles (32 km), and Interstate 24 runs along the southwestern border of the county for about 10 miles (16 km). U.S. Routes 41 and 431 run through the county, intersecting and briefly forming a concurrency in Springfield. US 31W forms the eastern border with Sumner County and runs through White House and Cross Plains. Major state routes include 25, 49, 52, 76, and 109. Secondary state routes in Robertson County include 161, 256, and 257.

== Government and politics ==
=== County Government ===
The county mayor serves as the chief executive officer of Robertson County and is elected at-large. The current county mayor is Republican Keith Hoover, who took office in 2026.

Legislative authority is vested in the Robertson County Board of County Commissioners, which is composed of 24 members elected from 12 districts, with two commissioners representing each district.

==== Countywide elected officials ====
Office	Name
District Attorney	Robert Nash (R)
County Mayor	Keith Hoover (R)
Sheriff	Michael Van Dyke (R)
Trustee	Kendra Shelton (R)
Assessor of Property	Chris Traughber (R)
County Clerk	Angie Groves (R)
Register of Deeds	John West (R)
Circuit Court Clerk	Kristy Chowning (R)

=== State elected offices ===
Both members that represent Robertson County in the Tennessee General Assembly are held by Republicans.

Representatives
Position	Name	Party	First Election	District
State Senator	Kerry Roberts	Rep	2014	23
State Representative	Sabi "Doc" Kumar	Rep	2014	66

=== Political history ===
United States presidential election results for Robertson County, Tennessee
Year	Republican		Democratic		Third party(ies)	
Year	No.	%	No.	%	No.	%
1912	513	16.73%	2,287	74.57%	267	8.71%
1916	733	25.08%	2,106	72.05%	84	2.87%
1920	1,191	28.04%	3,046	71.70%	11	0.26%
1924	229	11.94%	1,645	85.77%	44	2.29%
1928	848	35.30%	1,543	64.24%	11	0.46%
1932	252	8.31%	2,752	90.71%	30	0.99%
1936	388	12.70%	2,629	86.03%	39	1.28%
1940	490	13.01%	3,258	86.49%	19	0.50%
1944	622	16.77%	3,074	82.90%	12	0.32%
1948	376	9.53%	3,044	77.14%	526	13.33%
1952	1,834	26.59%	5,063	73.41%	0	0.00%
1956	1,517	23.25%	4,961	76.02%	48	0.74%
1960	1,776	30.15%	4,053	68.80%	62	1.05%
1964	1,797	23.70%	5,784	76.30%	0	0.00%
1968	1,802	22.47%	2,315	28.86%	3,904	48.67%
1972	4,175	56.43%	2,985	40.34%	239	3.23%
1976	2,505	24.77%	7,547	74.62%	62	0.61%
1980	3,560	32.00%	7,381	66.34%	185	1.66%
1984	5,445	48.34%	5,756	51.11%	62	0.55%
1988	5,714	48.95%	5,884	50.41%	74	0.63%
1992	5,271	33.41%	8,498	53.86%	2,010	12.74%
1996	6,685	41.19%	8,465	52.16%	1,079	6.65%
2000	9,675	47.98%	10,249	50.83%	240	1.19%
2004	15,331	60.54%	9,865	38.96%	127	0.50%
2008	17,903	64.83%	9,318	33.74%	393	1.42%
2012	17,643	67.11%	8,290	31.53%	356	1.35%
2016	19,410	71.59%	6,637	24.48%	1,066	3.93%
2020	24,536	72.77%	8,692	25.78%	489	1.45%
2024	26,260	74.88%	8,428	24.03%	382	1.09%

== See also ==
- National Register of Historic Places listings in Robertson County, Tennessee
- List of counties in Tennessee
