= Richard Bell =

Richard Bell may refer to:

== Politics ==
- Richard Bell (MP for Lincoln) (died c. 1417), English member of parliament (MP)
- Richard Bell (MP for Derby) (1859–1930), British Labour member of parliament and trade unionist
- Dick Bell (1913–1988), Canadian member of parliament
- Richard Bell (Georgia judge) (1920–2005), associate justice of the Supreme Court of Georgia
- Richard Bell (Virginia politician) (born 1946), member of the Virginia House of Delegates

== Music ==
- Richard Bell (musician) (1946–2007), member of the Band
- Richard Bell (aka Fast Dick), guitarist with Crazyhead
- Richard Bell (music producer), Jamaican record producer

== Sport ==
- Dick Bell (footballer), Scottish footballer
- Richard Bell (running back) (born 1967), NFL running back
- Richard Bell (American football coach) (1937–2025), head football coach at the University of South Carolina (1982)
- Richard Bell (cricketer) (1874–1953), English cricketer

== Others ==
- Richard Bell (actor) (died 1672), English stage actor
- Richard Bell (Arabist) (1876–1952), Scottish Arabic scholar
- Richard Bell (artist) (born 1953), Aboriginal Australian artist and activist
- Richard Bell (bishop) (died 1496), Bishop of Carlisle from 1477 to 1495
- Richard Bell (director) (born 1975), Canadian screenwriter and director
- Richard K. Bell, American ambassador
- Richard Williams Bell (1811–1857), American author who reportedly saw events caused by Bell Witch

== See also ==
- Ricky Bell (disambiguation)
