= Bell Witch (disambiguation) =

The Bell Witch is a folk legend from the American south.

Bell Witch may also refer to:

== Film ==
- Bell Witch: The Movie, a 2007 horror film
- The Bell Witch Haunting, a 2013 horror film

== Music ==
- Bell Witch (band), an American doom metal band from Seattle, Washington,
- The Bell Witch (EP), by Mercyful Fate
