= Bell Witch =

Legendary 19th century haunting in Middle Tennessee

The Bell Witch
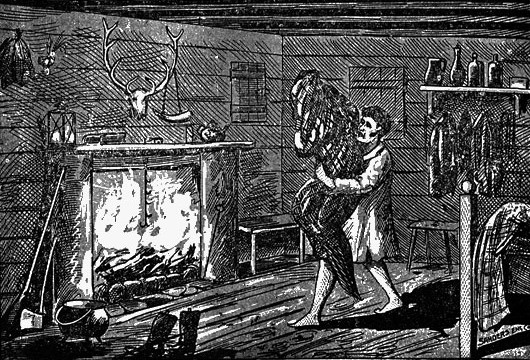
- William Porter (right) Attempts to Burn the Witch (left) (Illus. 1894)

Creature information
- Other name: Kate
- Grouping: Legendary creature
- Sub grouping: Spirit
- Similar entities: Poltergeist, Jinn, Demon, Goblin
- Folklore: American folklore

Origin
- First attested: 1817
- Country: United States
- Region: Middle Tennessee; Robertson County, Tennessee; Adams, Tennessee
- Details: Found in caves

The Bell Witch or Bell Witch Haunting is a legend from Southern United States folklore, centered on the 19th-century Bell family of northwest Robertson County, Tennessee. Farmer John Bell Sr. resided with his family along the Red River in an area currently near the town of Adams. According to legend, from 1817 to 1821, his family and the local area came under attack by a mostly invisible entity that was able to speak, affect the physical environment, and shapeshift. Some accounts record the spirit also to have been clairvoyant and capable of crossing long distances with superhuman speed (or of being in more than one place at a time).

In 1894, newspaper editor Martin V. Ingram published his Authenticated History of the Bell Witch. The book is widely regarded as the first full-length record of the legend and a primary source for subsequent treatments. The individuals recorded in the work were known historical personalities. In modern times, some skeptics have regarded Ingram's efforts as a work of historical fiction or fraud. Other researchers consider Ingram's work a nascent folklore study and an accurate reflection of belief in the region during the 19th century.

While not a fundamental element of the original recorded legend, the Bell Witch Cave in the 20th century became a source of continuing interest, belief, and generation of lore. Contemporary artistic interpretations such as in film and music have expanded the reach of the legend beyond the regional confines of the Southern United States.

== Legend synopsis ==
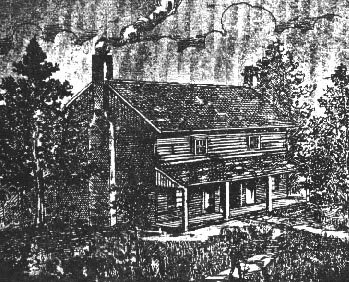
An artist's sketching of the Bell home, originally published in 1894

In his book An Authenticated History of the Bell Witch, author Martin V. Ingram published that the invisible entity was called Kate, after her voice claimed at one point to be "Old Kate Batts' witch," and continued to respond favorably to the name. In modern times, the Bell Witch is commonly described as a poltergeist. Poltergeist is a German loanword meaning "noisy ghost," and poltern is cognate with the English words bell and bellow sharing the PIE root *bʰel, meaning "to sound, ring, roar." However the term poltergeist was not used in English until 1838, with the Bell name for the legend thought derived from the surname of the local Tennessee family. Throughout the haunting, physical activity centered on the Bells' youngest daughter, Betsy, and her father, and Kate expressed particular displeasure when Betsy became engaged to a local named Joshua Gardner.

The haunting began sometime in 1817 when John Bell witnessed the apparition of a strange creature resembling a dog. Bell fired at the animal but it disappeared. John's son Drew Bell approached an unknown bird perched on a fence that flew off and was of "extraordinary size." The daughter Betsy observed a girl in a green dress swinging from the limb of an oak tree. Dean, a slave belonging to the Bell family, reported being followed by a large black dog on evenings he visited his wife. Activity moved to the Bell household with knocking heard along the door and walls. The family heard sounds of gnawing on the beds, invisible dogs fighting, and chains along the floor. About this time John Bell began experiencing paralysis in his mouth. The phenomena grew in intensity as sheets were pulled from beds when the children slept. Soon the entity pulled hair and scratched the children with particular emphasis on Betsy who was slapped, pinched and stuck with pins.

The Bells turned to family friend James Johnston for help. After retiring for the evening at the Bell home, Johnston was awakened that night by the same phenomena. That morning he told John Bell it was a "spirit, just like in the Bible." Soon word of the haunting spread with some traveling great distances to see the witch. The apparition began to speak out loud and was asked, "Who are you and what do you want?" and the voice answered feebly, "I am a spirit; I was once very happy but have been disturbed." The spirit offered diverse explanations of why it had appeared, tying its origin to the disturbance of a Native American burial mound located on the property, and sent Drew Bell and Bennett Porter on an unproductive search for buried treasure. With the emergence of full conversations, the spirit repeated word for word two sermons given 13 miles apart at the same time. The entity was well acquainted with Biblical text and appeared to enjoy religious arguments. As another amusement, the witch shared gossip about activities in other households, and at times appeared to leave for brief moments to visit homes after an inquiry.

John Johnston, a son of James, devised a test for the witch, something no one outside his family would know, asking the entity what his Dutch step-grandmother in North Carolina would say to the slaves if she thought they did something wrong. The witch replied with his grandmother's accent, "Hut tut, what has happened now?" In another account, an Englishman stopped to visit and offered to investigate. On remarking on his family overseas, the witch suddenly began to mimic his English parents. Again in the early morning, the witch woke him to voices of his parents worried as they had heard his voice as well. The Englishman quickly left that morning and later wrote to the Bell family that the entity had visited his family in England. He apologized for his skepticism.

At times, the spirit displayed a form of kindness, especially towards Lucy, John Bell's wife, "the most perfect woman to walk the earth." The witch would give Lucy fresh fruit and sing hymns to her, and showed John Bell Jr. a measure of respect.

Referring to John Bell Sr. as "Old Jack," the witch claimed she intended to kill him and signaled this intention through curses, threats, and afflictions. The story climaxes with the Bell patriarch being poisoned by the witch. Afterward the entity interrupted the mourners by singing drinking songs. In 1821, as a result of the witch's entreatment, Betsy Bell called off her engagement to Joshua Gardner. Subsequently, the entity told the family it was going to leave, but return in seven years in 1828. The witch returned on time to Lucy and her sons Richard and Joel with similar activities as before, but they chose not to encourage it, and the witch appeared to leave again.

Several accounts say that during his military career, Andrew Jackson was intrigued with the story and his men were frightened away after traveling to investigate. In an independent oral tradition recorded in the vicinity of Panola County, Mississippi, the witch was the ghost of an unpleasant overseer John Bell murdered in North Carolina. In this tradition, the spirit falls in love with the central character 'Mary', leading to her death. This account is reminiscent of vampire lore. The supernatural powers attributed to the Tennessee spirit have also been compared to that of jinn in mythology.

In the manuscript attributed to Richard Williams Bell, he wrote that the spirit remained a mystery:

Whether it was witchery, such as afflicted people in past centuries and the darker ages, whether some gifted fiend of hellish nature, practicing sorcery for selfish enjoyment, or some more modern science akin to that of mesmerism, or some hobgoblin native to the wilds of the country, or a disembodied soul shut out from heaven, or an evil spirit like those Paul [sic] drove out of the man into the swine, setting them mad; or a demon let loose from hell, I am unable to decide; nor has anyone yet divined its nature or cause for appearing, and I trust this description of the monster in all forms and shapes, and of many tongues, will lead experts who may come with a wiser generation, to a correct conclusion and satisfactory explanation.

— Williams Bell, An Authenticated History of the Bell Witch: Chapter 8

== Early written records ==
=== Long-Bell Expedition, 1820 ===
Military officer John R. Bell joined the Stephen Harriman Long expedition in 1820 to explore the central Great Plains. Due to lack of provisions, Long and Bell led divided parties after they reached the Rocky Mountains and rejoined in Fort Smith, Arkansas. Bell kept a detailed journal of his travel. His return trip, on October 19, 1820, crossed the Red River at Port Royal, Tennessee. Later that day, Bell stopped at the Murphey residence in Robertson County to eat dinner. During the stay, Bell was told of a young woman accompanied by a voice. The voice wished for the woman to marry a local man, and thousands had traveled to hear it. The journal's connection to the Bell Witch legend was discussed by local historian David Britton during a television broadcast produced for the Discovery Channel in November, 2020.

Rather a singular circumstance was here related to me, of a young girl of about 15 years of age, residing but 3 miles from Murphey, a voice accompanies her which says she should marry a man a neighbor - thousands of persons have visited her to hear this voice, in many instances, it will reply to questions put to it, the visitors have left as little satisfied in their curiosity as before they heard it, many are under the impression, that it is ventrelequism [sic] imposed upon the hearers either by the girl or her brother - who it seems is generally in her company, her family is respectable.

— John R. Bell, The Journal of Captain John R. Bell

=== The Saturday Evening Post ===
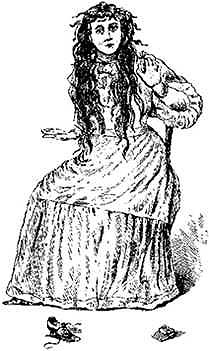
An artist's drawing of Betsy Bell, originally published in 1894

The publications New England Farmer of Boston and the Green Mountain Freeman of Vermont in January and February 1856 published an article regarding the Bell Witch legend and the publications ascribed the origin of the text to the Saturday Evening Post. The Farmer was a weekly agricultural journal. The Freeman was affiliated with the abolitionist Liberty Party. The original Post article, published January 19, 1856, is styled as a letter to the editor with the author identified only by the initial H.

The unidentified author described the apparition as the 'Tennessee Ghost' or 'Bell Ghost,' and stated the event occurred 30 years or more from the time the article was written. There are three human characters in the account, Mr. Bell, his daughter Betsey Bell, and Joshua Gardner. The author stated that the voice, which spoke freely about the house from all directions, would not manifest itself until the lights were extinguished at night. The phenomenon attracted wide interest. The author claimed to have become well acquainted with Mr. Gardner. When the ghost was asked how long it would remain, it replied, "until Joshua Gardner and Betsey Bell get married." The author goes on to state that Betsey Bell had fallen in love with Joshua Gardner and had discovered the skill of ventriloquism. The author states that Ms. Bell then used her skill to attempt to convince Joshua Gardner to marry her. When they did not marry, the apparition disappeared.

M. V. Ingram, in his An Authenticated History Of The Bell Witch, wrote that a Saturday Evening Post article regarding the Bell Witch had been retracted:

About 1849 the Saturday Evening Post, published either in Philadelphia or New York, printed a long sketch of the Bell Witch phenomenon, written by a reporter who made a strenuous effort in the details to connect her with the authorship of the demonstrations. Mrs. Powell was so outraged by the publication that she engaged a lawyer to institute suit for libel. The matter, however, was settled without litigation, the paper retracting the charges, explaining how this version of the story had gained credence, and the fact that at the time the demonstrations commenced Betsy Bell had scarcely advanced from the stage of childhood and was too young to have been capable of originating and practicing so great a deception. The fact also that after this report had gained circulation, she had submitted to any and every test that the wits of detectives could invent to prove the theory, and all the stratagems employed, served only to demonstrate her innocence and utter ignorance of the agency of the so-called witchery, and was herself the greatest sufferer from the affliction.

— Martin V. Ingram, An Authenticated History of the Bell Witch: Chapter 9

=== Clinard and Burgess Trial, 1868 ===
In September 1868, an article was published entitled "Witchcraft and Murder: Hobgoblins and Old Gray Horses the Incentive to Crime." Tom Clinard and Dick Burgess were arrested for the murder of Mr. Smith. The article reported that Smith claimed the powers of witchcraft while working near Adam's Station, chopping wood on a farm with the defendants. The article stated that Smith claimed to use these occult powers on Clinard and Burgess, leading to the conflict between them. The identity of the decedent was reported variously as James or Charles Smith. The jury of State vs. Clinard and Burgess returned a not guilty verdict.

Ingram published an interview with Lucinda E. Rawls, of Clarksville, Tennessee, daughter of Alexander Gooch and Theny Thorn, both reported as close friends of Betsy Bell. Rawls testified that the Bell Witch was a frequent topic of conversation during her lifetime and pointed to a murder of a man for witchcraft as evidence for this claim.

The Bell Witch was, and is still, a great scapegoat. Every circumstance out of the regular order of things is attributed to the witch. It has not been long since a man claiming to be the witch was waylaid and murdered by two men who were cleared, on the plea that the murdered man had bewitched them.

— Lucinda Rawls, An Authenticated History of the Bell Witch: Chapter 12

Ingram appended a date of 1875 or 1876 to the bloodshed, but connected the Rawls recollection with the death of Smith:

Smith came into the community a stranger, and was employed by Mr. Fletcher, where Clinard and Burgess were also engaged on the farm. Smith professed to be something of a wizard, or rather boasted of his power to hypnotize and lay spells on people, subjecting anyone who came under his influence to his will, and it was reported that he claimed to have derived this power from the mantle of the Bell Witch. However, the writer interviewed Hon. John F. House, who was council for the defense, on the subject, who says that no such evidence was produced in the trial, but that the lawyers handled the Bell Witch affair for all that it was worth in the defense of their clients, presenting the analogy or similarity of circumstances with good effect on the jury.

— Martin V. Ingram, An Authenticated History of the Bell Witch: Chapter 12

=== Haunted House, 1880 ===
On April 24, 1880, an article was published regarding a 'haunted house' in Springfield, Tennessee where knocking underneath the floor was heard. The fourth night of knockings began at 10:30 p.m. and ended at 4:00 a.m. with the home surrounded by 10-12 persons working in an effort to discover the origin of the sound. In a follow-up report from April 26, 1880, the writer reported that several hundred people had visited the home attempting to witness the phenomenon with many camped out overnight despite the homeowners asking them to leave. On Wednesday night, April 28, 1880, the family were reported to have left the home for the night and a smaller group of investigators around the home heard knocking from fifty yards away. During the events, the journalist took the opportunity to mention the Bell Witch legend:

It is an actual fact that several hundred intelligent people of Springfield and vicinity have been so excited over the noise as to go night after night to listen to it ... About thirty years ago Robertson county had a sensation similar to this known as the "Bell Witch," and people came from all parts of the country, even as far as New York, to hear or see her.

The Springfield floor knocking occurred at the residence of John W. Nuckolls, a prominent physician. Nuckolls was recently married to Laura Hopkins Jones, a union opposed by her family. The phenomenon created a domestic disturbance between the couple, as a local carpenter, Gill Walling, accused Laura Nuckolls of creating the noise with an iron ball attached to a rubber belt hidden under her clothes. Robertson County historian Yolanda Reid states, "they came to the conclusion that the wife was tying it into the bottom of her skirt to make the sounds, nobody ever proved it." The couple separated in May, 1880. That August, John Nuckolls retrieved his infant child from his wife, running through town with his estranged wife following in anguish. Afterward the child was returned to Laura Nuckolls who was living with her father, Asa Hopkins. John Nuckolls, in February 1882, confronted Laura's father, over his desire to see the child, and threatened his father-in-law's life. During the argument, the subject of 'ghosts' between the men was reported by an eyewitness as Nuckolls attempted to shoot Hopkins but was restrained. The next day, as a result of this confrontation, Nuckoll's brother-in-law, S. B. Hopkins, traveled from Nashville and shot John W. Nuckolls with a double-barreled shotgun, causing his death. The circumstances of the shooting were contested and S. B. Hopkins was acquitted of murder.

The journal Studies in Philology, in 1919, published a study of witchcraft in North Carolina by folklorist Tom Peete Cross. Cross cites a column from the Nashville Banner where it mentions the paper had sent a reporter to Robertson County in the 1880s, John C. Cooke, to investigate reports of the possible reemergence of the Bell Witch phenomenon.

=== Nashville Centennial Exposition ===
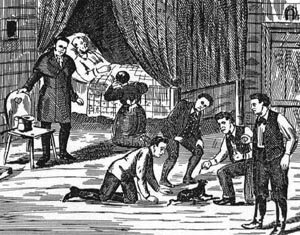
The death of John Bell, December, 1820. Illustration first published in 1894.

A several page account of the Bell Witch legend was included in a sketch of Robertson County and was reportedly written for Nashville's Centennial Exposition in 1880. The sketch was published in 1900 by the Tennessee Historical Society. The author of the sketch is unknown and the article is undated. Dates in the sketch end at 1880. The writer stated the source of the first portion of the narrative from "F. R. Miles, William Pride, W. J. Gooch, Ben. B. Batts, and many others." The author identified the burial disturbance as skull bones previously located in a "mound nearby on the river bluff." The return of the remains did not placate the spirit. The witch could speak in several languages and would "set the dogs" on unsuspecting victims. In the Centennial account, the Bell entity did not explicitly poison John Bell.

At one time a vial of poison was found in the flue of the chimney, and being taken down, Dr. George B. Hopson gave one drop to a cat, causing its death in seven seconds. The witch claimed to have put the poison there for the purpose of killing Mr. Bell. Being asked how it was going to administer the poison, it said by pouring it into the dinner pot. It is remarkable that, although he enjoyed good health up to the time of this event, Mr. Bell died within [ ] days after the vial was found, being in a stupor at the time of his death. From this time the people visited the house less frequently, although the witch would now and then be heard.

In the Ingram account, attributed to Richard Williams Bell, John Bell was already suffering from an unknown affliction and bedridden for some time. John Bell's son, John Bell Jr., found the vial in the cupboard after his father did not wake. The family called for Dr. Hopson, while the Bell Witch exclaimed she had fed the poison to John Bell. Alex Gunn and John Bell Jr. tested the poison on the cat with a straw, which "died very quick." The vial and contents flashed a blue flame when thrown into the fireplace. John Bell died the next day on December 20, 1820.

The Centennial sketch stated the witch could appear as a rabbit, bear or black dog, and imitate various animal sounds. The voice claimed it was one of seven spirits with three names given for itself: Three Waters, Tynaperty, and Black Dog. The Ingram account also described a family of spirits that demonstrated during a short period of time. The members of the 'witch family' had the names of Blackdog, Mathematics, Cypocryphy, and Jerusalem. Blackdog was described as the apparent leader of the group.

=== Goodspeed's History of Tennessee ===
Goodspeed Brothers' 1886 History of Tennessee, recorded a short account of the legend that identified the spirit as female and stated that interest in the phenomenon was widespread in the region at the time.

A remarkable occurrence, which attracted widespread interest, was connected with the family of John Bell, who settled near what is now Adams Station about 1804. So great was the excitement that people came from hundreds of miles around to witness the manifestations of what was popularly known as the "Bell Witch." This witch was supposed to be some spiritual being having the voice and attributes of a woman. It was invisible to the eye, yet it would hold conversation and even shake hands with certain individuals. The freaks it performed were wonderful, and seemingly designed to annoy the family. It would take the sugar from the bowls, spill the milk, take the quilts from the beds, slap and pinch the children, and then laugh at the discomfiture of its victims. At first it was supposed to be a good spirit, but its subsequent acts, together with the curses with which it supplemented its remarks, proved the contrary. A volume might be written concerning the performances of this wonderful being, as they are now described by contemporaries and their descendants. That all this actually occurred will not be disputed, nor will a rational explanation be attempted. It is merely introduced as an example of superstition, strong in the minds of all but a few in those times, and not yet wholly extinct.

=== Accounts from 1890 ===
The week of January 20, 1890 hundreds of persons were reported to have visited a house 2.5 miles east of Hopkinsville, Kentucky as word spread of coal mysteriously falling from the ceiling in the family room. The house was occupied by a prominent minister of the Cumberland Presbyterian Church, W. G. L. Quaite, his wife, step-daughter Belle Hall, as well as an unnamed sixteen-year-old female servant. Mrs. Quaite was injured as a piece struck her on top of the head and she required medical attention. An earlier report suggested the servant girl as a potential suspect, while stating the superstitious were invoking a connection to the "Bell Witches of Robertson County" from decades earlier. The frequency of the coal drops declined by the end of the week. Reverend Quaite attributed supernatural agency to the activity and was praying in the evening in an effort to solve the mystery.

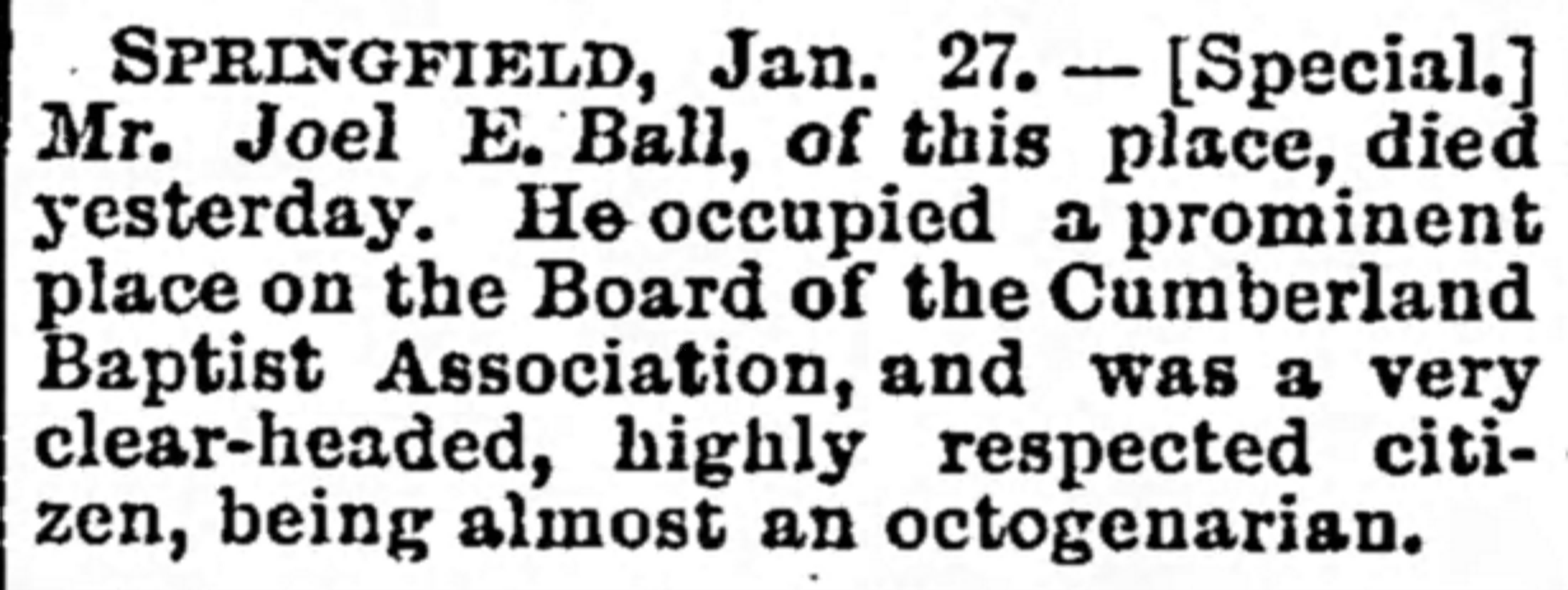
Nashville death notice for Joel Egbert Bell (1813–1890). Bell was the youngest and last surviving child of John and Lucy Bell Sr.

An article was published on February 3, 1890, describing a series of events from Adam's Station, Tennessee. At dusk, January 27, 1890, Mr. Hollaway reported watching two unknown women arrive at his home and dismount from their horses as he was feeding cattle. When he arrived at the house, the horses and women were gone. Mr. Hollaway's wife reported seeing the women in the yard as well. That week, Mr. Rowland attempted to place a sack of corn on his horse's back and it fell off. He again attempted to place the sack of corn on the horse's back several more times, but each time the sack fell off. Joe Johnson arrived and held on to the sack as Mr. Rowland mounted his horse. They witnessed the sack floating away for 20 yards where it settled down at the fence. When the men went to retrieve the sack, a voice was heard, "You won't touch this sack anymore."

A follow-up report was published on February 18, 1890, with the title, "A Weird Witch: More Tales of a Mulhattanish Flavor from Adams Station." In the late 19th century, Joseph Mulhattan was a known hoaxer of newspaper articles. The article was republished a few days later with the subtitle "More Tales of a Fishy Flavor." In the account, the entity was referred to only as the witch. The article reports that Mr. Johnson was visiting Buck Smith and was discussing a recent visitation of the ghost at his home. They heard a knocking at the door, and when they opened the door, the knocking began at another door. They sat down and the dog began to fight with something invisible. Two minutes later, the door flew open and fire spread across the room blown by a cyclonic wind with the coals disappearing as they tried to put it out. That evening Mr. Johnson started home on his horse and something jumped on the back grabbing his shoulder as he tried to restrain the horse. He felt it jump off as he neared his home and move in the leaves into the woods.

Mr. Winters reported taking a peculiar bird while hunting with great difficulty. After he returned home, he opened the game-bag to discover the bird had disappeared and in place was a rabbit which then also disappeared. While burning vegetation outdoors, Mr. Rowland described a visit at 9 p.m. of a half-clothed black man with one eye in his forehead that directed Mr. Rowland to follow him and dig at a large rock. The figure then disappeared. Mr. Rowland dug that night until exhaustion. He received help the next morning from Bill Burgess and Mr. Johnson and discovered something described as a "kettle turned bottom upward." They were unable to remove it as the soil began moving back into the hole faster than the men could remove the soil. The report concludes by saying that many people were visiting to see the witch.

== Martin Van Buren Ingram ==
=== Biography ===
Born near Guthrie, Kentucky, June 20, 1832, Martin Van Buren Ingram took over responsibility of the family farm at the age of 17. A member of Hawkins' Nashville Battalion during the Civil War, he was discharged for disability after the Battle of Shiloh. Ingram began his editing and publishing career in April 1866 with the Robertson Register with no previous experience. October 1868, Ingram moved the paper to Clarksville and began issuing the Clarksville Tobacco Leaf in February 1869. Ingram continued an ownership association with the Leaf until about 1881. The consequences of poor health, family tragedy and fire limited his continuing interest in the newspaper industry.

On the occasion of Ingram's death in October 1909, editor of the Clarksville Leaf Chronicle, W. W. Barksdale, wrote of his friend and colleague:

We doubt exceedingly if there ever lived a man who performed as much self-sacrificing labor to further the interests of the community in which he lived. He became a citizen of Clarksville forty years ago and from that time practically until the day of his death his greatest concern was the advancement and welfare of his adopted town and county ... A man of true mold, he despised all deceit, trickery, and littleness, and with a courage which nothing could daunt, he laid on the journalistic lash unsparingly whenever he thought the occasion required. Naturally, his was not a pathway strewn with roses – his was an aggressive nature, a fact which often brought him into serious collision with those with whom he took issue. Time, however, usually justified him in the positions which he assumed.

— W. W. Barksdale, Clarksville Leaf Chronicle

=== An Authenticated History of the Famous Bell Witch ===
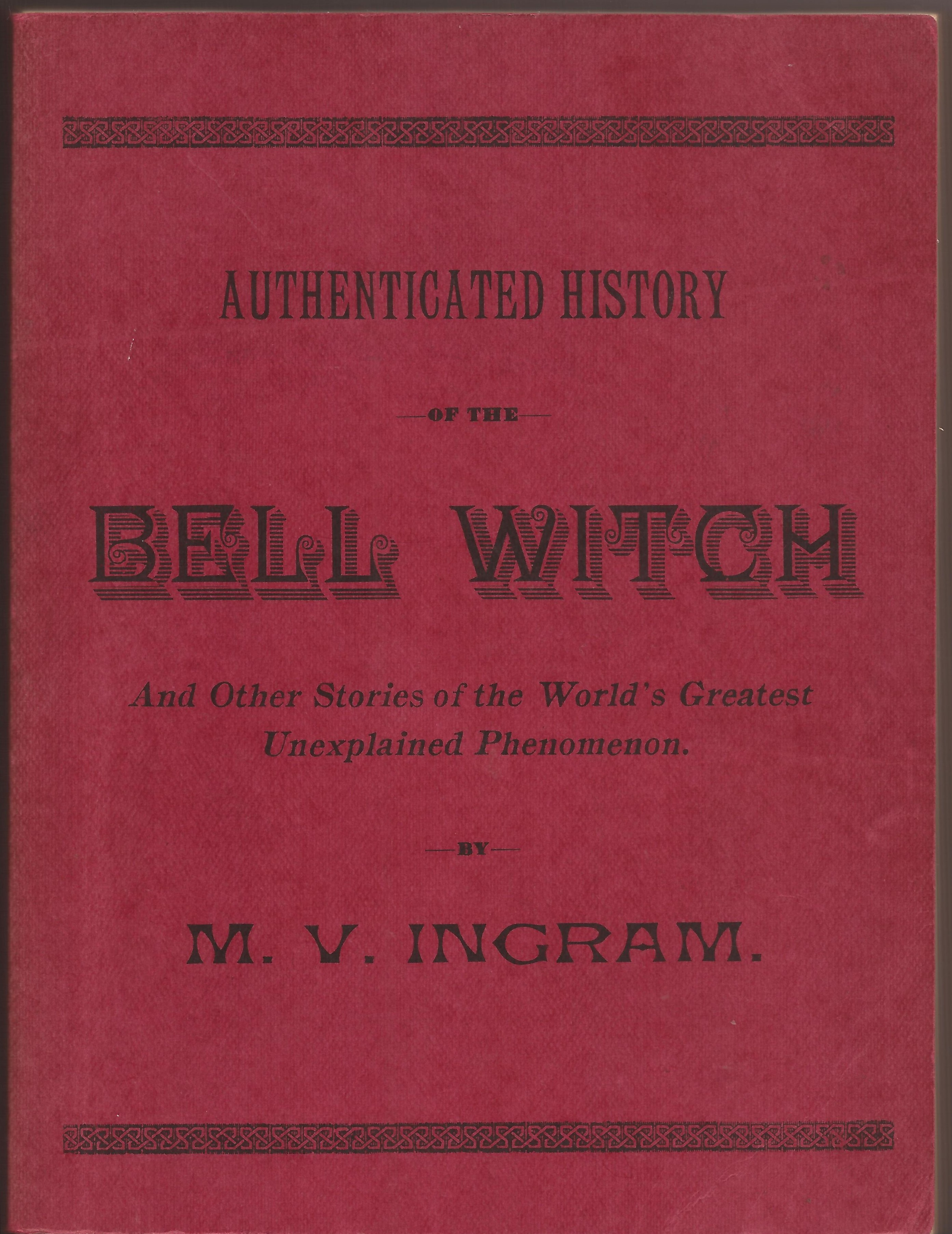
Authenticated History of the Bell Witch, Rare Book Reprints, 1961. Also known as "The Red Book".

The week of January 24, 1890, Ingram was suffering from a "severe case of la grippe." In February 1890, Ingram resigned as editor of the Clarksville Chronicle. A month later, the Chronicle was purchased by the Leaf, and Ingram joined the new editorial staff. On July 13, 1892, a report in the Leaf-Chronicle was published of Ingram's travels to Adams Station and Cedar Hill with John Allen Gunn, "for the purpose of viewing the grounds where historic and most intensely thrilling events were enacted seventy-five years ago," and interviewing individuals, who "were then living and familiar with the wonderful phenomena that awakened such a widespread sensation." In the report, Mahala Darden, age 85, related memory of Lafayette's visit to Clarksville in 1825. A follow-up report was published July 19, 1892, recording a visit to Nancy Ayers, daughter of John Johnston. Ingram left the editorial position with the Leaf-Chronicle the same month.

Ingram subsequently traveled to Chicago in October 1893, while editor of the Progress-Democrat, in an attempt to publish his manuscript, An Authenticated History of the Famous Bell Witch. The Wonder of the 19th Century, and Unexplained Phenomenon of the Christian Era. The Mysterious Talking Goblin that Terrorized the West End of Robertson County, Tennessee, Tormenting John Bell to His Death. The Story of Betsy Bell, Her Lover and the Haunting Sphinx. Ingram left the Progress-Democrat to complete his book in February 1894. At the end of March, it was announced publisher W. P. Titus of Clarksville would print the work. The publisher reported a delay in printing after the witch visited one night in early May. Titus stated the witch demonstrated with maniacal singing, laughter, prayers, moaning, clapping, and rattling of the roof. The phenomena caused the printers to evacuate. By July 1894, the book was in print and a review from the newspaper in nearby Hopkinsville presented the work as a factual account.

In the introduction to the book, Ingram published a letter dated July 1, 1891, from former TN State Representative James Allen Bell of Adairville, Kentucky. J. A. Bell, a son of Richard Williams Bell and a grandson of John Bell Sr., explained that his father had met with his brother John Bell Jr. before his death and they agreed no material he had collected should be released until the last immediate family member of John Bell Sr. had died. The last immediate member of the family and youngest child of John Bell Sr., Joel Egbert Bell died in 1890 at the age of 76.

Now, nearly seventy-five years having elapsed, the old members of the family who suffered the torments having all passed away, and the witch story still continues to be discussed as widely as the family name is known, under misconception of the facts, I have concluded that in justice to the memory of an honored ancestry, and to the public also whose minds have been abused in regard to the matter, it would be well to give the whole story to the World.

— J. A. Bell, 1891 Letter, An Authenticated History of the Bell Witch

J. Allen Bell expressed the belief that his father's manuscript was written when he was 35 years old in 1846. He stated his father gave him the manuscript and family notes shortly before his death in 1857. Richard Williams Bell was roughly 6 to 10 years of age during the initial manifestations of the Bell Witch phenomenon and 17 at the occurrence of the spirit's return in 1828. The reported contributions of Richard Williams Bell, approximately 90 pages in length, are recorded in Chapter 8 of Ingram's work, entitled Our Family Trouble.

According to Brian Dunning no one has ever seen this diary, and there is no evidence that it ever existed: "Conveniently, every person with firsthand knowledge of the Bell Witch hauntings was already dead when Ingram started his book; in fact, every person with secondhand knowledge was even dead." Dunning also concluded that Ingram was guilty of falsifying another statement, that the Saturday Evening Post had published a story in 1849 accusing the Bells' daughter Elizabeth of creating the witch, an article which was not found at the time. Joe Nickell argues the chapter includes the use of Masonic themes and anachronism which impacts credibility. Jim Brooks, a native of Adams, writes in his work Bell Witch Stories You Never Heard, that Bell family descendants report that Ingram did not return the manuscript to the family. Brooks explores the possibility that Ingram would have had an enhanced opportunity to modify the story by not returning the papers.

Keith Cartwright of the University of North Florida compares Ingram's work with Uncle Remus folklore as recorded by Joel Chandler Harris and also as an expression of the psychological shame of slavery and Native American removal. The slaves in the account are regarded as experts on the witch, with Uncle Zeke identifying the witch as, "dat Injun spirit ... the Injuns was here fust, and we white fokes driv em out, all but dem whar wur dead and cudent go, an da's here yit, in der spirit." The figure of "progress" Gen. Andrew Jackson was brought nearly to heel and the master, John Bell, was dead. The role of the trickster not played by the Br'er Rabbit but the witch-rabbit, the spirit's common animal form. The displaced, blacks, widows, and girls, act as witnesses to a force polite society cannot comprehend. The witch, "appears as a catch-all for every remainder of resistant agency."

Among those who were alive during the haunting, Ingram conducted interviews with Ibby Gunn, born in 1806, a daughter of Uncle Zeke and the sister-in-law of Dean, as well as Mahala Byrns Darden, born circa 1807, daughter of James Byrns. Ibby Gunn shared some experiences of Dean including the creation of a witch ball made of hair by her sister Kate for her husband Dean, the use of which appeared to anger the entity. Mahala Darden detailed what she understood family and friends were experiencing at the time of the haunting, expressed her great fear the witch would come to visit her home and also related the spirit sang "Row me up some brandy, O" at the conclusion of John Bell's graveside service.

==== Andrew Jackson ====
The account of General Andrew Jackson's visit is confined to Chapter 11 of Ingram's work. The chapter is a letter from Thomas L. Yancey, an attorney in Clarksville, dated January 1894. Yancey explained that his grandfather, Whitmel Fort, was a witness to phenomena at the Bell homestead and Fort had related the story of Jackson's visit which was undated in the letter. Yancey described his grandfather's account as, "quite amusing to me."

The Bell household was strained of resources from visitors and Jackson brought a wagon load of supplies with his men. Nearing the Bell homestead, the wagon stopped and appeared fastened to its position despite considerable effort by Jackson's men to free it. Jackson exclaimed, "By the eternal, boys, it is the witch." A metallic voice was heard in the vegetation, "All right General, let the wagon move on, I will see you again tonight." The horses began moving again. Instead of camping out, the party stayed at the Bell home that evening. Among the Jackson party was a 'witch layer' who boasted of his supernatural exploits. Tiring of the bravado, Jackson whispered, "By the eternals, I do wish the thing would come, I want to see him run." The entity arrived and taunted the witch slayer to shoot her. The man's gun would not fire. The witch countered, "I'll teach you a lesson," and appeared to beat the man and led him out the door by his nose. Jackson exclaimed, "By the eternal, boys, I never saw so much fun in all my life. This beats fighting the British." The witch told Jackson she would uncover another rascal the next night. That morning Jackson's men chose to leave for home as they were apprehensive as to who was next.

Paranormal investigator Benjamin Radford, as well as Brian Dunning, conclude that there is no evidence that Andrew Jackson visited the Bell family home. During the years in question, Jackson's movements were well documented, and nowhere in history or his writings is there evidence of his knowledge of the Bell family. According to Dunning, "The 1824 Presidential election was notoriously malicious, and it seems hard to believe that his opponent would have overlooked the opportunity to drag him through the mud for having lost a fight to a witch." Carl Lindahl, affiliated with the University of Houston, writes that the Andrew Jackson encounter is an example of how belief and history mix together in the formation of legend. Such legends, which may persist in a locale for generations, upon receiving a media treatment can spread far outside of the area where the legend originated.

== Legend in the 20th century ==
John Kendall of Guthrie, Kentucky, recalling memories near his 90th birthday in 1899, had visited the Bell family home during the disturbances as a boy and was asked if he believed in the Bell Witch. Kendall believed it was deceptions of an "old woman who was a member of the household."

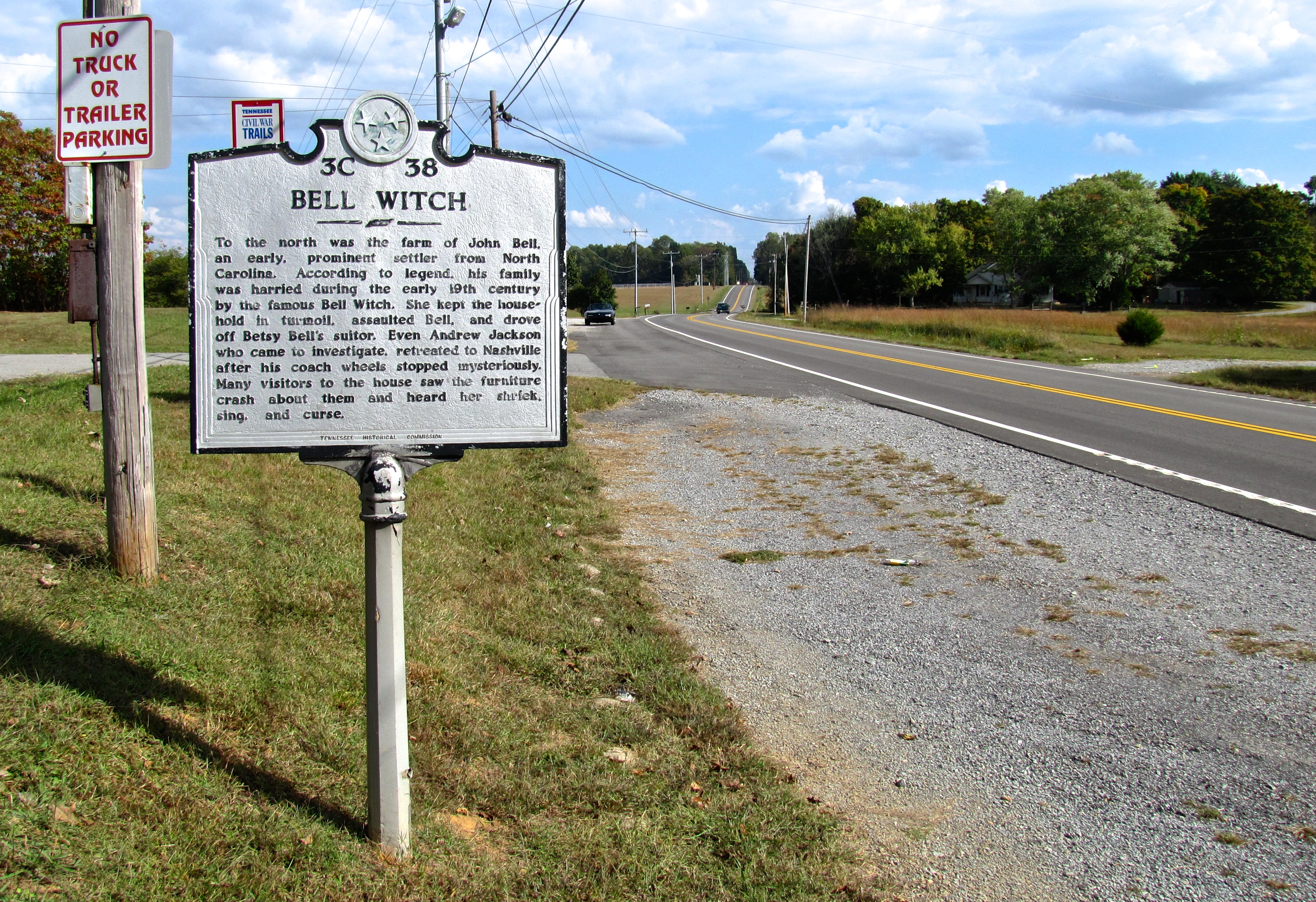
Tennessee Historical Commission marker along U.S. Route 41 in Adams, Tennessee

A prophecy was reported by May 1903 that the witch could return on the centennial of the Bell family arrival in Tennessee. In response to an August 1903 article from Memphis, The Springfield Herald expressed that no one in the local area was concerned with a return of the Bell Witch and made a charge of plagiarism towards the Memphis paper. The Herald also stated the copyright for Ingram's work had passed to his son Tolbert who was working at The Denver Times. By September, the local paper was again incredulous as the spirit was not reported to have returned in August.

Charles Bailey Bell, a grandson of John Bell Jr., and neurologist in Nashville, published a book entitled The Bell Witch: A Mysterious Spirit in 1934. In the work, he recounted stories he stated were told to him by his great-aunt Betsy later in her life. This included another account of Andrew Jackson's visit and of a boy trapped in the Bell Witch Cave and pulled out of the cave feet first by the witch. Bell also detailed a series of prophecies he stated were given to his ancestors in 1828 by the spirit, including a declaration the witch was set to return again in 1935, 107 years after her last visit to the Bell family.

In 1937, there were reports of quirky events. Louis Garrison, owner of the farm that included the Bell Witch Cave, heard unexplained noises coming from inside. Bell descendants described the sound of something rubbing against a house, a paper like object that flew out the door and reentered through a side door, and faint music heard from a piano. A group from the local Epworth League were reported to have attended a wiener roast in a rock quarry near the Bell Witch Cave on July 29, 1937. The group were joking about the legend when they saw a figure of a woman sitting on top of the cliff over the cave causing many to flee. According to the newspaper, a minister in the group later claimed to have investigated and discovered it was moonlight on a rock. The second report concluded with a weather report that the moon was barely noticeable that night. Jim Brooks published in 2015 that his mother was in attendance at the roast, and relates that the minister caught up to the youth on the road to town after discovering no explanation for the figure.

In November 1965, an article was published involving an antique oak rocking chair said to have been previously owned by attorney Charlie Willett, a Bell descendant. The rocking chair was acquired in Willett's estate sale by Mrs. J. C. Adams, owner of an antique store on U.S. 41. A customer sat down in the chair, after learning it was not for sale, and while rocking in the chair asked Mrs. Adams if she believed in the supernatural. Two weeks later, the customer's daughter visited the home of Mrs. Adams and said after her mother had left and visited the Bell cemetery a voice told her to "stand up and look around, you will find something of much value." After some car trouble, the woman walked out into a field and found a black iron kettle turned over. She turned the kettle over and found a pearl buckle in the grass. The woman's daughter reported a jeweler estimated the buckle to be 160 to 200 years old.

Attorney Charles Romaine Willett (1886–1963), son of Sarah Elizabeth Bell, began an interest in the newspaper business at the age of 16. After some time playing professional baseball and working at other newspapers, Willett became the first managing editor of the Nashville Tennessean in 1907 while teaching himself law. A mayor of Adams, and member of the State legislature, Charlie Willett was known for his reliability. Every Sunday, Willett would accompany his sweetheart, Miss Jerry Cullom Gardner, for ice cream in Clarksville and dinner at Richardson's Restaurant on the return home. According to community lore, the couple never married so as not to tempt fate as they descended from the Bell and Gardner families respectively. Jim Brooks relates that a family member detailed familial obligations as the likely explanation. Brooks inquired what the couple thought about the rumor in the early 1960s. Jerry Gardner explained if Charlie Willet ever asked her to marry him, she would assent. When Brooks related this to Charlie Willett, he immediately smiled, pulled his thumbs through his suspenders and said, "Oh, she said that, did she?"

Bonnie Haneline, in 1977, recounted a time during her childhood in 1944 when she was exploring the cave. She left English class, playing 'hooky,' and borrowed a lantern from Mrs. Garrison, the cave owner. She reported to have explored the cave with her friends for several years. While she was inside, her lantern blew out despite no breeze inside the cave. She managed to relight the lantern and it blew out again. Terrified, she crawled along the water path of the cave in the dark until she reached the entrance where she saw an opened can of pork and beans and marshmallows. Later that evening, she learned law enforcement discovered two escaped fugitives in the back of the cave. She credited the witch with helping her avoid them.

A visit in 1977 was reported of five soldiers from nearby Fort Campbell to the Bell Witch Cave. One of the soldiers was sitting on a rock and expressed skepticism of the legend when something invisible grabbed him around the chest.

In 1986, staff writer David Jarrard for The Tennessean and photographer Bill Wilson, the latter also a member of the National Speleological Society, were given permission to sleep in the cave over night. While in the first cave room they heard a noise from deeper in the cave Jarrard estimated at 30 yards. Subsequently, an "unwavering groan" repeated again with greater volume and accompanied by several loud thumps. When it began a third time, the men retreated to the gate entrance. They explored the wiring to the lights looking for a reason for the noises. They went back to the first cave room but heard a rumble near the entrance. Walking back to the entrance they discovered the rumble was noise from a jet. As they reached the gate, a loud, high pitched scream emanated from inside the cave. The journalists left and did not spend the night.

In 1987, H. C. Sanders, owner of a nearby gas station, reported 20 years earlier he ran out of gas at night near the Red River across from the Bell Witch Cave. He began to walk towards town when a rabbit came out of the woods and began to follow him. Sanders walked faster, but the rabbit kept pace even as he broke out into a run. After a mile, Sanders sat down on a log to catch his breath. The rabbit hopped up on the other side of the log looked at him and said, "Hell of a race we had there, wasn't it?"

== Skeptical evaluation ==
According to Ben Radford, the Bell Witch story is an important one for all paranormal researchers: "It shows how easily legend and myth can be mistaken for fact and real events and how easily the lines are blurred" when sources are not checked. Radford reminds readers that "the burden of proof is not on skeptics to disprove anything but rather for the proponents to prove ... claims".

Brian Dunning wrote that there was no need to discuss the supposed paranormal activity until there was evidence that the story was true. "Vague stories indicate that there was a witch in the area. All the significant facts of the story have been falsified, and the others come from a source of dubious credibility. Since no reliable documentation of any actual events exists, there is nothing worth looking into." Dunning concludes, "I chalk up the Bell Witch as nothing more than one of many unsubstantiated folk legends, vastly embellished and popularized by an opportunistic author of historical fiction."

Joe Nickell has written that many of those who knew Betsy suspected her of fraud and the Bell Witch story "sounds suspiciously like an example of "the poltergeist-faking syndrome" in which someone, typically a child, causes the mischief."

Amy Fluker, a researcher of the Mississippi version of the legend while affiliated with the University of Mississippi, has expressed the Bell Witch legend has other value. "As a historian of collective memory, it matters very little to my research if hauntings are real or not. It does matter that people believe they are. As a result, they can help us understand the perspectives, in this case, of 19th and 20th century Americans."

== Bell Witch in culture ==
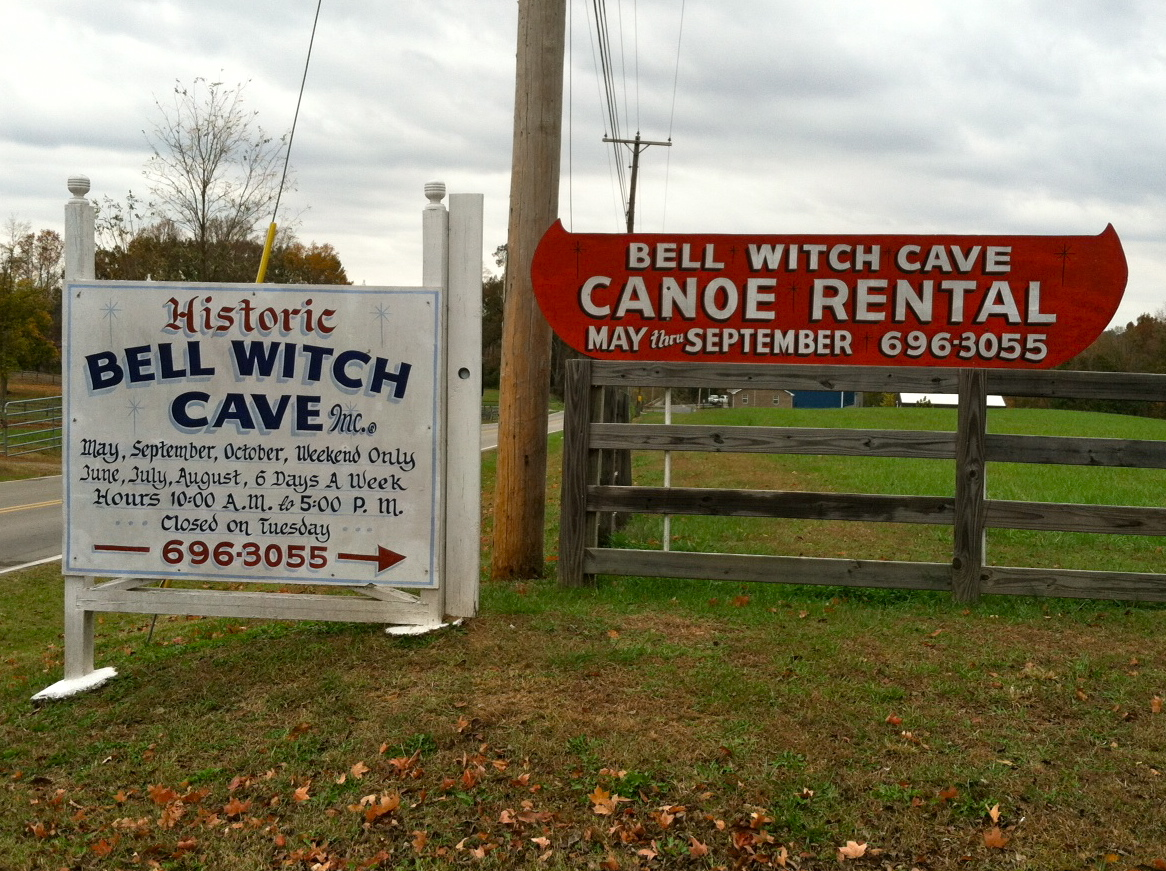
Signs at the entrance to the Bell Witch Cave promote ghost tourism in Adams, Tennessee

=== Film ===
There have been several films based, at least in part, on the Bell Witch legend. Roger Clarke, former film critic for The Independent, argues the legend has also had a measurable influence on cinema such as in the Poltergeist film series, the found footage Paranormal Activity film series, The Witch released in 2015, the trope of burial ground disturbance in The Amityville Horror, and the apport of cherries to the children in Mama released in 2013.

Year	Title	Genre	Director	Citation
1999	The Blair Witch Project	Found footage horror	Daniel Myrick and Eduardo Sánchez	
2004	Bell Witch Haunting	Supernatural horror	Ric White	
2005	An American Haunting	Supernatural horror	Courtney Solomon	
2007	Bell Witch: The Movie	Supernatural horror	Shane Marr	
2008	The Bell Witch Legend	Documentary	Zac Adams	
2013	The Bell Witch Haunting	Found footage horror	Glenn Miller	
2020	The Mark of the Bell Witch	Documentary	Seth Breedlove	

=== Television ===
The American paranormal television series Ghost Adventures filmed an episode at the Bell Witch Cave.

Director Sid Zanforlin released a documentary episode on the legend and the town of Adams in 2014 for a series entitled Boogeymen: Monsters Among Us which aired on Destination America and also organized as a collection known as America's Monsters entitled "Forest Monsters: Mothman and the Bell Witch."

An American television series – Cursed: The Bell Witch – based on selected descendants of the Bell family trying to end a curse. The series premiered October 2015 on the A&E Network.

In 2018, the Travel Channel series Haunted Live featured paranormal investigative team, the Tennessee Wraith Chasers visiting the town of Adams, Tennessee, where the descendants of the Bell family take them to the cabin.

Expedition X explored caves of Middle Tennessee and the legend in 2020.

=== Music and Theater ===
Charles Faulkner Bryan, as a part of a Guggenheim Fellowship, composed The Bell Witch, a cantata which premiered in Carnegie Hall in 1947 with Robert Shaw conducting the Juilliard Chorus and Orchestra.

Nashville music group The Shakers released Living In The Shadow Of A Spirit in 1988 on vinyl record EP.

Ann Marie DeAngelo and Conni Ellisor choreographed and composed a ballet entitled The Bell Witch for the Nashville Ballet.

Nashville Children's Theatre premiered Our Family Trouble: The Legend of the Bell Witch in 1976. The play was written by Audrey Campbell.

A play by Ric White, The Bell Witch Story. First performed in 1998 by the Sumner County Players. And performed again in 2008 by the Tennessee Theater Company.

A play by David Alford, Spirit: The Authentic Story of the Bell Witch of Tennessee, performed in Adams, TN during the Bell Witch Fall Festival in late October.

The Danish metal band Mercyful Fate released a song titled "The Bell Witch" on their 1993 album In the Shadows.

Seattle-based doom metal band Bell Witch took their name from this legend.

Merle Kilgore recorded a song titled "The Bell Witch" in 1964.

Madeline recorded a song titled "The Legend of the Bell Witch" in 2014.

Pat Fitzhugh and Mike Richards released an Americana folk song "The Bell Witch (Let the Game Begin)" in October, 2020.

Jimbo Mathus and Andrew Bird released a track entitled "Bell Witch" on their Americana album These 13 in March 2021.

Murfreesboro Little Theatre performed Who Killed John Bell, written by Jess Townsend, at Oaklands Mansion in Murfreesboro, Tennessee, in August 2022.

=== Selected bibliography ===
Year	Title	Author	Publisher	ASIN/ISBN	Note
1894	An Authenticated History of the Famous Bell Witch	Ingram, Martin V.	W. P. Titus (1894); Rare Book Reprints (1961)	Variable by reprint	First known full length account.
1930	The Bell Witch of Tennessee	Miller, Harriet Parks	Leaf-Chronicle Publishing		Local historian from Port Royal, Tennessee.
1934	The Bell Witch: A Mysterious Spirit	Bell, Charles Bailey	Lark Bindery	B000887W6Y	Author a descendant of the Bell family.
1969	The Bell Witch at Adams	Barr, Gladys	David Hutchinson Publishing	B003ZFNLS0	Children's Literature.
1979	Echoes of the Bell Witch in the Twentieth Century	Brehm, H. C.	Brehm, H. C.	B0006EKRKS	Eden family anecdotes (Bell Witch Cave).
1997	The Bell Witch: An American Haunting	Monahan, Brent	St. Martin's Press	031215061X	Novel. Basis for the 2005 film, An American Haunting.
1999	Season of the Witch	Taylor, Troy	Whitechapel Productions	1892523051	Author founder of the American Ghost Society.
2000	The Bell Witch: The Full Account	Fitzhugh, Pat	Armand Press	097051560X	Tennessee based paranormal author and historian.
2002	All That Lives: A Novel of the Bell Witch	Sanders-Self, Melissa	Warner Books	0446526916	Novel.
2008	Bell Witch: The Truth Exposed	Headley, Camille Moffitt	Bell Witch Truth	0615222617	With Kirby family (Bell Witch Cave).
2013	The Bell Witch	Taff, John F. D.	Books of the Dead	1927112192	Novel. St. Louis based horror author.
2015	Bell Witch Stories You Never Heard	Brooks, Jim	McClanahan Publishing House	1934898546	Native of Adams, Tennessee. Descendant of John Johnston.
2015	Little Sister Death	Gay, William	Dzanc Books	1938103130	Novel. Tennessee Author. Published posthumously.
2016	Our Family Trouble: A Domestic Thriller	Winston, Don	Tigerfish	0692838082	Novel. Author Nashville native.
2023	The Bell Witch in Myth and Memory	Gregory, Rick	University of Tennessee Press	1621908372	Nonfiction. Author resident of Adams.

== See also ==
- List of ghost films
- List of ghosts
- Madam Koi Koi
