= Betsy Palmer =

American actress (1926–2015)

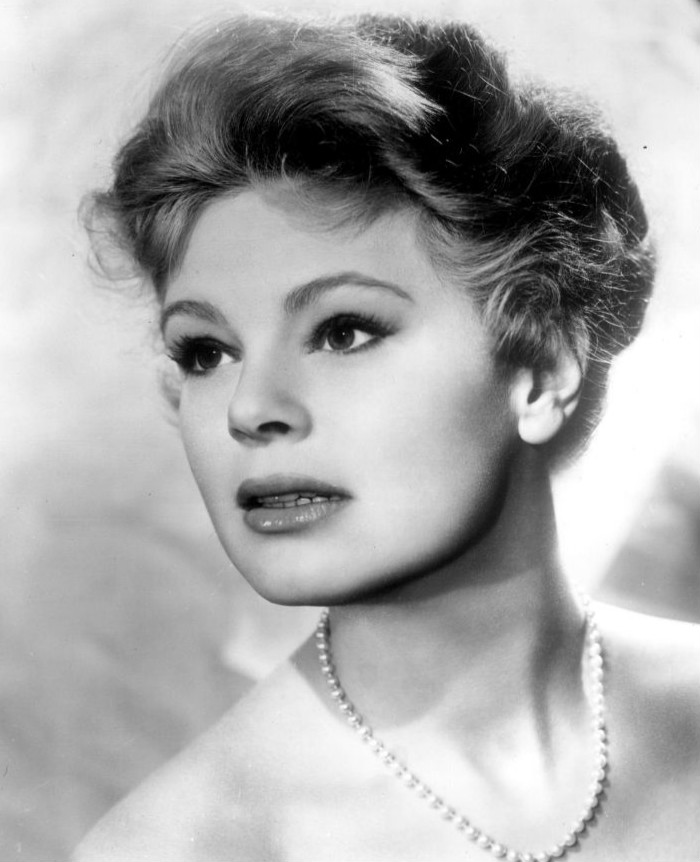
- Palmer in 1960
- Born: Patricia Betsy Hrunek; November 1, 1926; East Chicago, Indiana, U.S.
- Died: May 29, 2015 (aged 88); Danbury, Connecticut, U.S.
- Education: East Chicago Business College; Art Institute of Chicago
- Occupation: Actress
- Years active: 1951–2007
- Notable work: Friday the 13th
- Television: I've Got a Secret, anthology series, game shows
- Spouse: Vincent J. Merendino (m. 1954; div. 1971)
- Children: 1

Betsy Palmer (born Patricia Betsy Hrunek; November 1, 1926 – May 29, 2015) was an American actress known for her many film and Broadway roles, television guest-starring appearances, as a panelist on the game show I've Got a Secret, and later for playing Pamela Voorhees, the antagonist and mother of Jason Voorhees, in the first Friday the 13th film (1980).

== Early life ==
Palmer was born Patricia Betsy Hrunek on November 1, 1926, in East Chicago, Indiana, the daughter of Marie (née Love), an adoptee, who launched the East Chicago Business College before she married, and Rudolph Vincent Hrunek (1894–1969), an industrial chemist, born in Žižkov, Prague, Bohemia, Austria-Hungary (now Czech Republic), who became a stay-at-home father. She performed in school plays all through childhood, graduated from East Chicago's Roosevelt High School in 1944, then attended East Chicago Business College. After graduation, she worked as a stenographer and secretary for the car foreman on the RIP track of the B&O Railroad. She hated it, she said, because she was shut off from people. Some time after Palmer took an aptitude test at the Chicago YWCA, which indicated a flair for the arts, her father brought a coworker home for dinner, a former New York actor who recommended she study with David Itkin. Working days and commuting to night classes from East Chicago, she graduated from the Goodman School of Drama at the Art Institute of Chicago (now at DePaul University).

== Acting career ==
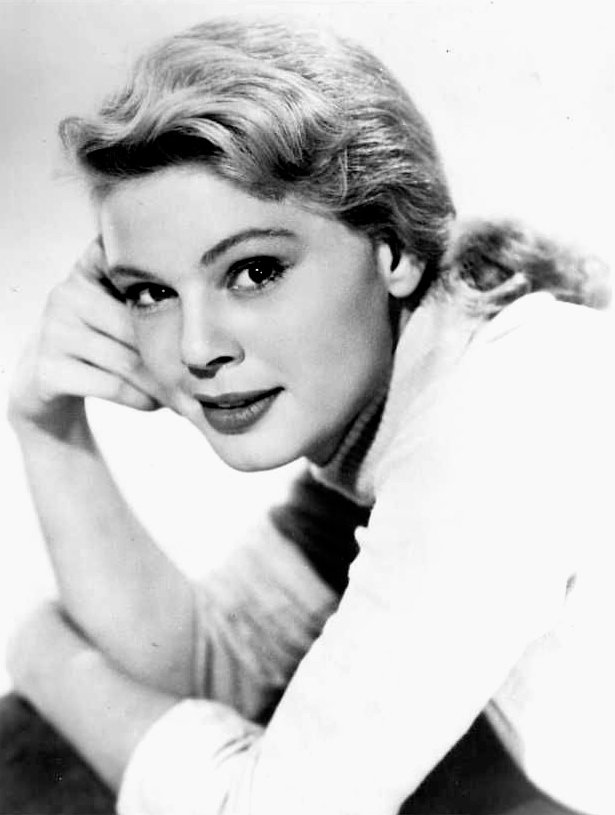
Palmer in 1958

Palmer began working in summer stock in Lake Geneva, Wisconsin, then in winter stock at the Woodstock Opera House in Woodstock, Illinois, with Paul Newman, and then summer stock in Chicago with Imogene Coca. Having saved $400, she told her parents she was changing her name to Betsy Palmer and moving to New York City with Sasha Igler, who had a job in advertising.

Palmer got her first television acting job in 1951 when she joined the cast of the 15-minute weekday television soap opera Miss Susan, which was produced in Philadelphia, and all actors traveled each day from New York City by train. She was "discovered" for this role by Norman Lessing while attending a party in the apartment of actor Frank Sutton, who was married to Toby Igler, the sister of Palmer's roommate, Sasha Igler. She had been in Manhattan less than one week.

A life member of the Actors Studio, Palmer's stage work included a tour of South Pacific (as Nellie Forbush) and a summer-stock season in the title role in Maggie, the 1953 musical adaptation of What Every Woman Knows by William Roy and Hugh Thomas.

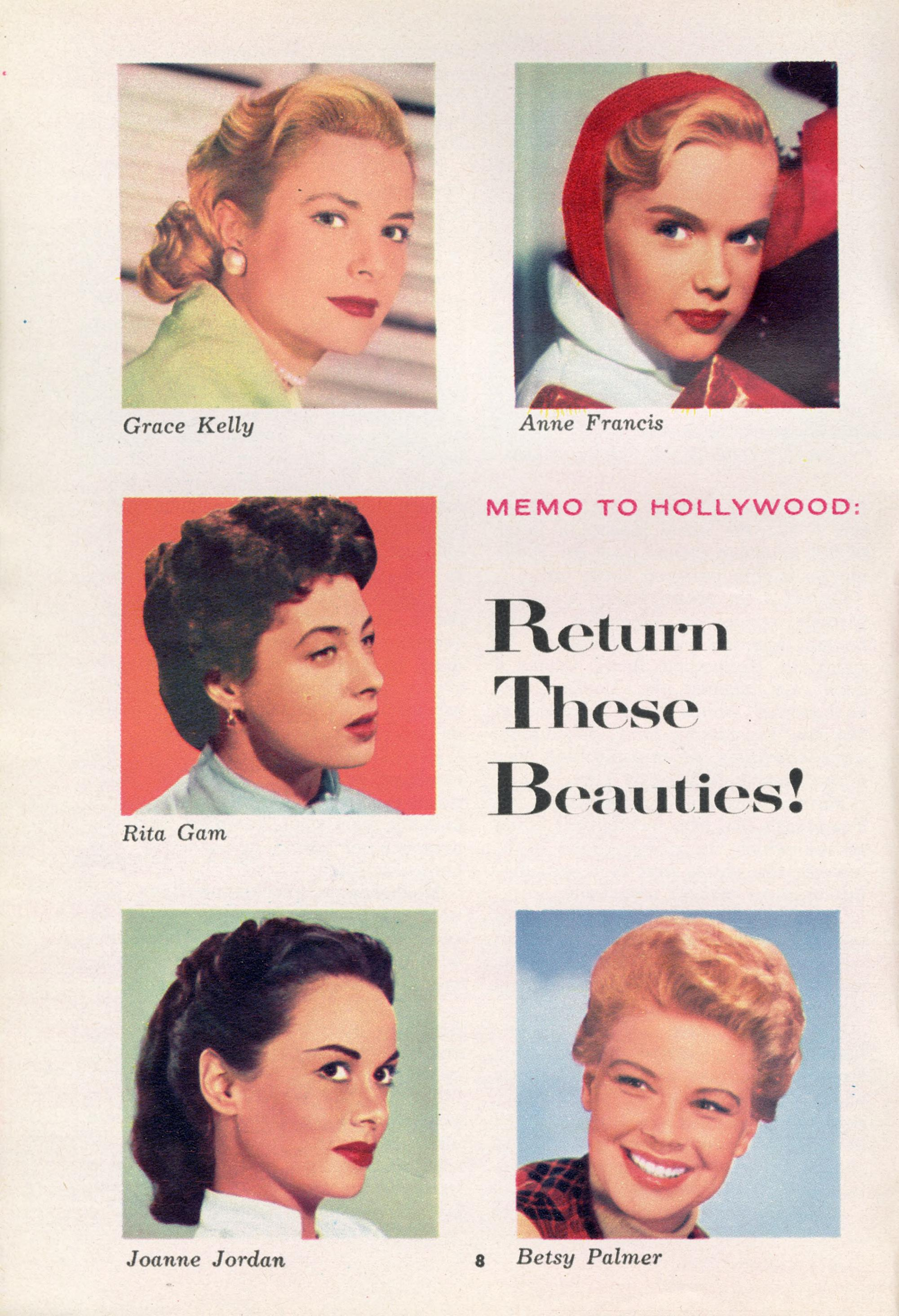
Palmer (bottom row, right) in TV Guide, October 30, 1954

In 1953, she created the role of Virginia in the original teleplay version of Paddy Chayefsky's Marty. Also in 1953, she appeared in a Studio One television broadcast of Hound-Dog Man with Jackie Cooper and others. She became a familiar face on television as a news reporter on Today in 1958 (the Today Girl), and a long-running regular panelist on the quiz show I've Got a Secret. She joined the show's original run, replacing Faye Emerson in 1958 and remaining until the show's finale in 1967. She did not reprise her role in any of the various revivals of the show. Palmer was the last surviving member of the I've Got a Secret first version's cast.

Palmer appeared as Kitty Carter in The Long Gray Line (1955), starring Tyrone Power and Maureen O'Hara. She also played nurse Lt. Ann Girard (the main female character) in Mister Roberts (1955), starring with Henry Fonda, Jack Lemmon, James Cagney, and William Powell. In the same year, she played Carol Lee Phillips in Queen Bee, which starred Joan Crawford.

Palmer starred alongside Anthony Perkins and Fonda again in the Paramount production of The Tin Star (1957).

In 1958, she played undercover agent Phyllis Carter/Lynn Stuart in the film The True Story of Lynn Stuart, co-starring Jack Lord and featuring Kim Spalding as her husband, Ralph Carter.

Palmer appeared in seven Broadway shows. All the original productions had short runs, but she replaced other actresses in long-run shows, notably Lauren Bacall in Cactus Flower in 1967, and Ellen Burstyn in Same Time Next Year in 1977. In 1976, Tennessee Williams chose Palmer to embody the frustrated lead, Alma Winemiller, in his The Eccentricities of a Nightingale.

Palmer's Mercedes-Benz stopped working on the highway to her home in Connecticut after a performance in New York City. To replace her car, her daughter suggested the Volkswagen Scirocco at a cost of $10,000. The offer of $1,000 a day for 10 days' work on location at a Boy Scout camp in New Jersey was a reason for taking a role in Friday the 13th. Her initial reaction to the experience was, "What a piece of shit! Nobody is ever going to see this thing." Despite her distaste for the film, she reluctantly consented to a cameo appearance in Friday the 13th Part 2. She ultimately came to accept and celebrate her participation in the franchise, eventually commenting, "I was dumb, Friday the 13th is an excellent film." Palmer was asked to reprise her role as Mrs. Voorhees in Freddy vs. Jason in 2003 and agreed to return, but she ultimately turned down the role after being offered a surprisingly low salary.

In 1982, Palmer created the role of Suzanne Becker on the CBS daytime soap opera As the World Turns. From 1989 to 1990, Palmer appeared on Knots Landing as Virginia "Ginny" Bullock, the aunt of Valene Ewing (played by series star Joan Van Ark). Palmer acted in a Mayfield Dinner Theatre production of On Golden Pond in Edmonton, Alberta, in 1997.

In 2002, Palmer provided the voice of the title character, the ghost of a witch, for the horror film Bell Witch: The Movie, released in 2007.

In 2005, around 79 years old, she appeared as Trudie Tredwell in the horror short Penny Dreadful and in 2007, at 81, as the older version of the title character in Waltzing Anna.

Palmer appeared in the 2006 documentary, Betsy Palmer: Scream Queen Legend, as part of the publicity for the 2007 release of Bell Witch: The Movie.

== Personal life ==
Palmer dated James Dean; the two met while working on an episode of Studio One television series.

Palmer married Vincent J. Merendino, an obstetrician-gynecologist, in 1954, whom she met in New York on a blind date. They divorced in 1971 after 17 years. She had one daughter, Melissa.

=== Death ===
Palmer died of natural causes on May 29, 2015, at a hospice care center in Danbury, Connecticut. She was 88.

== Filmography ==
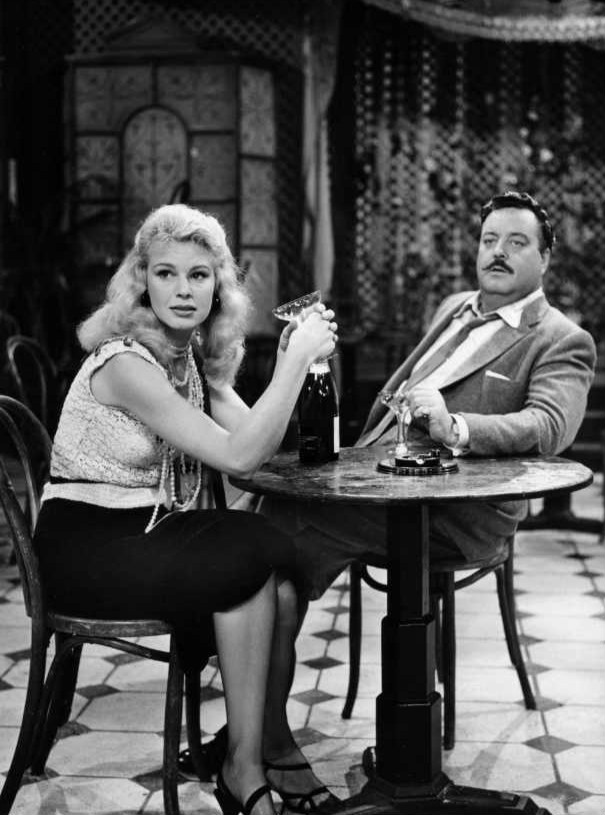
Betsy Palmer and Jackie Gleason in The Time of Your Life (1958)

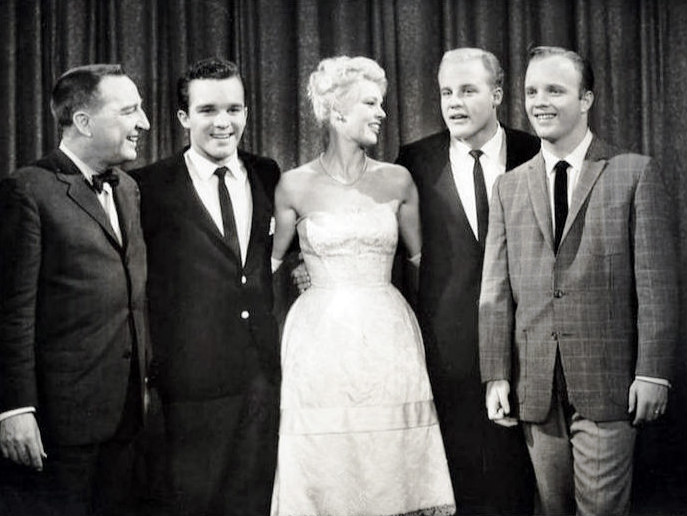
Palmer on I've Got a Secret with host Garry Moore and three of Bing Crosby's sons (1961)

Film
Year	Title	Role	Notes
1955	Death Tide	Gloria	
1955	The Long Gray Line	Kitty Carter	
1955	Mister Roberts	Lt. Ann Girard	
1955	Queen Bee	Carol Lee Phillips	
1957	The Tin Star	Nona Mayfield	
1958	The True Story of Lynn Stuart	Phyllis Carter / Lynn Stuart	
1958	The Time of Your Life	Kitty Duval	
1959	It Happened to Jane	Herself (panelist)	
1959	The Ballad of Louie the Louse	Tina Adams	TV movie
1959	The Last Angry Man	Anna Thrasher	
1968	A Punt, a Pass, and a Prayer	Nancy	TV movie
1980	Friday the 13th	Pamela Voorhees	
1981	Friday the 13th Part 2	Pamela Voorhees	
1981	Isabel's Choice	Ellie Fineman	TV movie
1982	Friday the 13th Part III	Pamela Voorhees	(archive footage)
1984	Friday the 13th: The Final Chapter	Pamela Voorhees	(archive footage)
1988	Windmills of the Gods	Mrs. Hart Brisbane	TV movie
1988	Goddess of Love	Hera	TV movie
1992	Still Not Quite Human	Aunt Mildred	TV movie
1994	Unveiled	Eva	
1999	The Fear: Resurrection	Grandmother	
2005	Penny Dreadful	Trudie Tredwell	
2006	Waltzing Anna	Anna Rhoades	(Final film performance)
2006	Betsy Palmer: Scream Queen Legend	Self	Documentary
2007	Bell Witch: The Movie	Bell Witch	(Final film release)
2009	His Name Was Jason: 30 Years of Friday the 13th	Herself	Documentary film
2013	Crystal Lake Memories: The Complete History of Friday the 13th	Herself	Documentary film

== Broadway credits ==
- The Grand Prize (1955)
- Affair of Honor (1956)
- Roar Like a Dove (1964)
- Cactus Flower (1967–1968) [replacement]
- Same Time, Next Year (1977–1978) [replacement]
- The Eccentricities of a Nightingale (1976)

== Television appearances ==
From 1953 to 2001, Palmer was a guest star on 73 television programs, including (in no particular order):

- Marty (1953) as Virginia
- The Philco-Goodyear Television Playhouse (1953–1956) as Janice Gans / Virginia
- Studio One in Hollywood (1953–1957)
- Janet Dean, Registered Nurse (1954) as The Jinx Nurse
- Lux Video Theatre (1954) as Intermission Guest
- The Goodyear Playhouse (1954–1957) as Paula Ferris
- Appointment with Adventure (1955)
- I've Got a Secret (1955–1967) as herself
- Kraft Television Theatre (1956–1957)
- Playhouse 90 (1958) as Kitty Duval / Emmy Verdon
- Password (1961–1964) as herself
- The Mike Douglas Show (1966–1971) as herself
- The Joey Bishop Show (1967) as herself
- The Today Show (1968) as herself
- To Tell the Truth (1970) as herself
- The $10,000 Pyramid (1973) as herself
- The New Candid Camera (1974) as herself
- The Love Boat (1982) as Millicent Holton
- Murder, She Wrote (1985–1989) as Valerie / Lila Norris
- Charles in Charge (1987) as Gloria
- Newhart (1987) as Gayle Crowley
- Out of This World (1987–1988) as Donna's Mom
- Knots Landing (1989–1990) as Virginia Bullock
- Columbo: Death Hits the Jackpot (1991) as Martha Lamarr
- Just Shoot Me! (1998) as Rhonda
- Hallmark Hall of Fame
- Toast of the Town
- Chips

== Awards ==
Award	Category	Work	Result
Fantasporto Film Festival	Special Career Award	Penny Dreadful	Won
Golden Raspberry Award	Worst Supporting Actress	Friday the 13th	Nominated
New England Theatre Conference (NETC) 2005 Major Award	Award for Stage Work	Various	Won
