= David Alford =

American actor (born 1964)

- Born: December 20, 1964 (age 60); Adams, Tennessee, U.S.
- Occupation(s): Actor, playwright, author

Ben David Alford (born December 20, 1964) is an American actor, playwright, and author, best known for portraying Bucky Dawes on the television series Nashville.

== Early life ==
Alford was born and raised in Adams, Tennessee on his family's farm. His parents were Ben Robert Alford, a minister, and Sheridan (Durham). Alford attended Jo Byrns High School in nearby Cedar Hill, and then went for two years to Martin Methodist College in Pulaski. He next transferred to Austin Peay State University in Clarksville, Tennessee. At APSU he was originally a vocal performance major, but switched to the theatre program.

== Acting ==
When playwright Arthur Kopit was visiting APSU as an artist in residence, he noticed Alford's acting talent and arranged for him to audition for the Juilliard School drama program. Alford did so, and was accepted to the program.

After spending a few years in New York upon graduation from Juilliard, Alford moved back to Tennessee and founded Mockingbird Theatre in Nashville. He was artistic director of this theatre from 1994 to 2004, when he accepted the position of artistic director for Tennessee Repertory Theatre. He held this position until 2007, but spent an additional year at Tennessee Rep as an artist-in-residence.

In 2012 Alford joined the cast of the television series Nashville, portraying Bucky Dawes, the manager of country music star Rayna Jaymes (Connie Britton). Alford appeared on the show until it ended in 2018.

In 2017 Alford appeared in the Broadway revival of The Little Foxes with Laura Linney, Cynthia Nixon, Michael McKean, and Richard Thomas. Alford portrayed Mr. Marshall, as well as understudying McKean and Thomas.

== Writing ==
Alford has written two plays that are presented annually as part of the Bell Witch Fall Festival in his hometown of Adams. Spirit: The Authentic Story of the Bell Witch of Tennessee (2002) recounts the Bell Witch legend. Smoke: A Ballad of the Night Riders (2010) is set against the Black Patch Tobacco Wars.

Alford also co-authored the book Living the Dream: The Morning After Drama School with Brian Horner.

== Personal life ==
Alford has two children from his first marriage. Since the fall of 2018, he has been a visiting artist in residence at Berry College in Mount Berry, Georgia.

== Filmography ==
=== Film ===
Year	Title	Role	Notes
1982	Venice Beach	Musician	
1999	Existo	Dirk Beverage	
2001	The Last Castle	Corp. Zamorro	
2002	Changing Hearts	Dr. Blethens	
2003	Charlie's War	Frank	
2006	The Second Chance	Parker Richards	
2007	Adrenaline	Chris Thompson	
2007	Prisoner	Principal Hamm	
2007	Deadbox	Cutter	
2009	Blood Rogues	Earle	
2012	Blue Like Jazz	Priest	
2013	Stoker	Reverend	
2014	Closer to God	Richard	

=== Television ===
Year	Title	Role	Notes
2000	On Music Row	Paul	TV movie
2002	A Death in the Family	Andrew Lynch	TV movie
2012–2018	Nashville	Bucky Dawes	89 episodes
2016	Local Air	Gil Cotton	
2017	The Blacklist	Mysterious Man	3 episodes
2021	The Good Fight	Benjamin Dafoe	Episode: "The Gang Discovers Who Killed Jeffrey Epstein"

=== Video games ===
Year	Title	Role	Notes
2018	Red Dead Redemption 2	The Local Pedestrian Population	
