= Richard Williams Bell =

Bell Witch author (1811–1857)

- Born: January 6, 1811; Robertson County, Tennessee, U.S.
- Died: October 24, 1857 (aged 46); Robertson County, Tennessee, U.S.
- Resting place: Old Bell Cemetery, aka John Bell Cemetery, Adams, Tennessee, U.S.
- Spouse: Sally Gunn
- Children: 2
- Father: John Bell

Richard Williams Bell (January 6, 1811 – October 24, 1857) was an American farmer in Robertson County, Tennessee whose family was reportedly terrorized by a malevolent apparition known as the Bell Witch from 1817 to 1821, culminating in his father's death when Richard was only 9 years old.

Richard is credited with having authored an eyewitness manuscript about his family's experiences titled Our Family Trouble in 1846, when he was 35. Journalist Martin Van Buren Ingram, who wrote the first dedicated account of the legend, maintained that this document formed the basis of his book An Authenticated History of the Bell Witch, though the original manuscript has never been found and is believed by many to be a fabrication by Ingram himself.

== Early life ==
Richard was born on January 6, 1811, the second-youngest of nine children born to John Bell Sr. (1750 – December 20, 1820) and Lucy Mourning Bell (née Williams; February 27, 1770 – January 27, 1837). In 1817, his family allegedly came under attack by a spirit who adopted the name "Kate." Various accounts written afterward tell stories similar to other poltergeist legends. It began with noises in the walls and grew to include unusual sounds; people being slapped and pinched, objects being thrown, and animals being spooked without visible cause.

== An Authenticated History of the Bell Witch ==
Journalist Martin Van Buren Ingram alleged that in 1846, Bell journalized the disturbances in a comprehensive manuscript that he later passed to his son, State Rep. Allen Bell, who went on to share it with his closest family members. Ingram claimed to have relied on Richard Williams Bell's manuscript in writing his book, An Authenticated History of the Bell Witch, incorporating the supposed testament in the form of a single chapter entitled "Our Family Trouble."

== Death ==
Richard Williams Bell died on October 24, 1857. He was buried with his parents and several siblings in the Old Bell Cemetery, aka John Bell Cemetery, near Adams, Tennessee.
