= Bell Witch: The Movie =

- Directed by: Shane Marr
- Written by: Shane Marr; Jay Guffey
- Produced by: Shane Marr
- Starring: Betsy Palmer; Cody Newton; John David Hart; Hope Banks; Todd Geren; Donna K. Pearson; Beverly Gwinn Jones; Jeff Kunard
- Cinematography: Stephen Thompson
- Edited by: Richard S. Brummer
- Distributed by: Big River Pictures; Cinemarr Entertainment
- Release date: September 1, 2007
- Running time: 99 minutes
- Country: United States
- Language: English

Bell Witch: The Movie (also known under the working title Tennessee 1) is a 2007 horror film. It is based on the Bell Witch legend and stars Betsy Palmer as the voice of the Bell Witch. It was released direct-to-video on September 1, 2007.

== Plot ==
The film retells the haunting legend about the Bell Witch of Adams, Tennessee, a historically documented haunting that took place in the early 19th century.

The film is described as a love story turned tragic when entangled with the legendary haunting of the Bell Witch. After stumbling across an ancient burial (in what is now known as the Bell Witch cave), brothers John Jr. and Williams Bell bring a strange curse home to their family causing their father, John, and sister, Betsy, to experience phantom attacks in the night and strange visions during the day.

== Filming details ==
Bell Witch: The Movie was shot in Townsend, Tennessee in September, 2002. The film was shot and mastered in high definition and its release was delayed until the technology was more widely available.
