= John Bell (farmer) =

American with unusual death (1750–1820)

John Bell Sr
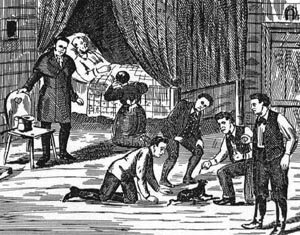
- A woodcut illustration from "The Authenticated History of the Bell Witch" (1894) by M.V. Ingram, depicting the death of Bell
- Born: 1750; Edgecombe County, Province of North Carolina, British America
- Died: December 20, 1820 (aged 70); Robertson County, Tennessee, U.S.
- Resting place: Old Bell Cemetery, aka John Bell Cemetery Adams, Tennessee
- Other name: Jack Bell
- Occupation: Farmer
- Spouse: Lucy Williams Bell (m. 1782)
- Children: 9, including Richard

John Bell Sr (1750 – December 19, 1820) was an American farmer whose death was attributed to supernatural causes. He is a central figure in the Bell Witch ghost story of southern American folklore. In 1817, Bell contracted a mysterious affliction that worsened over the next three years, ultimately leading to his death. According to the story, the Bell Witch took pleasure in tormenting him during his affliction, finally poisoning him one December morning as he lay unconscious after suffering a number of violent seizures.

== Early life ==
Born in Edgecombe County, North Carolina (now part of Halifax County), Bell was an apprentice barrel maker during his formative years and later pursued a career in farming. He married Lucy Williams in 1782 when she was 12 years old and he was 32, and settled on the farm he had bought previously. The Bells prospered over the next eight years and were among the area's most successful planters. In the winter of 1804–1805, Bell and his family embarked on a journey over the treacherous mountains of North Carolina and east Tennessee that took them to an area called "Red River," settling in the northwest section of present-day Adams, Tennessee.

Bell and his wife had nine children:

- Jesse
- Betsy (1806–1888)
- Richard (1811–1857)
- John Jr.
- Drewry
- Benjamin
- Esther
- Zadok
- Joel

== Bell Witch ==
Bell became a successful farmer and gained prominence in his new abode. It is said that sometime late in 1816, John and his daughter Betsy Bell began to be plagued by a goblin-like entity that came to be known as either the Bell Witch or Kate Batts Witch (after Kate Batts, a neighbor of the Bell family). The Bell Witch apparently appeared to John one day when he was inspecting his fields. It took the form of an animal, but ran off before he could shoot it. The entity then began attacking family members and even visitors to the house, and began haunting the community. The witch became known far and wide, and even Andrew Jackson visited the Bell household in 1819 to experience the Witch at first hand.

Bell's subsequent affliction was most likely a neurological disorder. Very little was known about such disorders in the early nineteenth century, and few treatment options were available, although the Scottish anatomist Sir Charles Bell discovered a neurological disorder that yielded symptoms almost identical to those displayed by John Bell at the onset of his affliction.

John Bell died on December 19, 1820, at the age of 70. After his death, the witch was no longer reported as attacking Bell's family. The Bell Witch is said to have disrupted the funeral service, singing bawdy drinking songs. The Bell Witch was said to have said she "fixed him," and "i did it," and "he will not get up," after the murder occurred. John Bell is reportedly the first person in history to be recorded as passing away due to supernatural causes.
