= Red River (Cumberland River tributary) =

Tributary of the Cumberland River in Tennessee, United States

Coordinates: 36.4864328°N 86.5116608°W

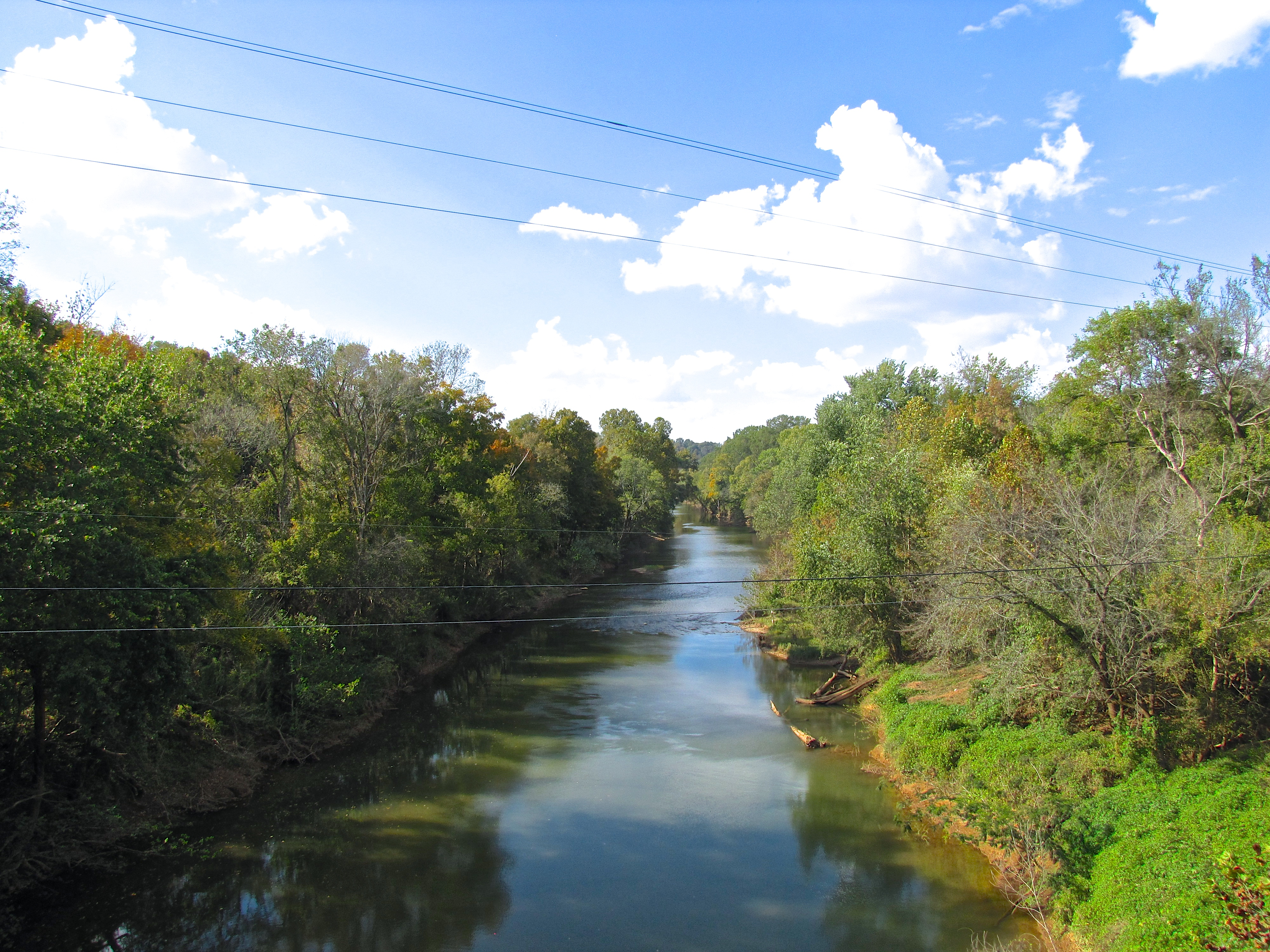
- The Red River in Adams, Tennessee

Location
- Country: United States
- States: Tennessee and Kentucky

Physical characteristics
- Source
  - location: Sumner County, Tennessee
- Mouth
  - location: Cumberland River
  - elevation: 358 ft (109 m)
- Length: 100 mi (160 km)
- Basin size: 1,482 mi^{2} (3,840 km^{2})

The Red River of the Cumberland, 100 miles (161 km) long, is a major stream of north-central Tennessee and south-central Kentucky, and a major tributary of the Cumberland River.

It rises in Sumner County, Tennessee, south of Portland. Trending generally northwest, it is crossed by several roads, notably State Route 76, U.S. Route 31W, and Interstate 65. A major tributary, the South Fork, forms nearby and runs parallel and south of the main river for several miles. For almost its entire length, it drains the northern Highland Rim of Tennessee and the adjacent (and analogous) Pennyroyal Plateau of Kentucky.

The Red River crosses briefly into Simpson County, Kentucky, and then enters Logan County, Kentucky. The South Fork also crosses into Logan County, coming from Robertson County, Tennessee, and joining the Red west of Adairville. Crossing the state line into Robertson County, the Red continues to flow primarily westward but with minor meanders. Crossed by U.S. Highway 41 near Adams, Tennessee, it is joined by an important tributary, Sulphur Fork, at the historic site of Port Royal, now a designated Tennessee State Historic Area. Tobacco was at one time loaded here onto shallow-draught boats, and a covered bridge crossed here. (The original covered bridge washed away in a flood, as a rebuilt replica also did subsequently.) The Red River and Sulphur Fork both form a small portion of the Robertson County-Montgomery County line, and the confluence at Port Royal marks a major jog in this line.

Flowing toward the Montgomery County seat of Clarksville, the stream is crossed by Interstate 24. It formerly marked the boundary between Clarksville and the adjoining community of New Providence; New Providence has long been annexed into Clarksville and is now regarded as a neighborhood of Clarksville, not a separate community. About 1.5 miles (2.4 km) above its mouth into the Cumberland, the Red River is joined by the West Fork of the Red River, its last tributary, which drains eastern Christian County and western Todd County, Kentucky. It is crossed by U.S. Route 41 Alternate just before its confluence with the Cumberland.

The stream's name derives from its typical water color. This is caused by a large load of clay and silt which contains iron oxides. As the area drained by the Red River becomes somewhat less agricultural and more of the remaining farmers switch to techniques involving less cultivation, it is likely that this color will continue to lessen in intensity, but certainly will not vanish.

The drainage basin around the Red River is the Red River Watershed. The entire watershed collects rain from an area 1,482 square miles (3,840 km^{2}) large.

== Attractions ==
The Red River Meeting House stands near the section of Red River that flows through Logan County. This meeting house was the site of one of the early revivals of the Second Great Awakening, a religious movement that swept over the United States near the turn of the 19th century. Red River Canoe, located in Adams, TN is known for its shallow slow moving current with canoes and kayaks to rent. A place of interest is the Bell Witch Cave, which is located on the left-hand side of the river.

== See also ==
- List of rivers of Kentucky
- List of rivers of Tennessee
