= Bell Witch Cave =

- U.S. National Register of Historic Places
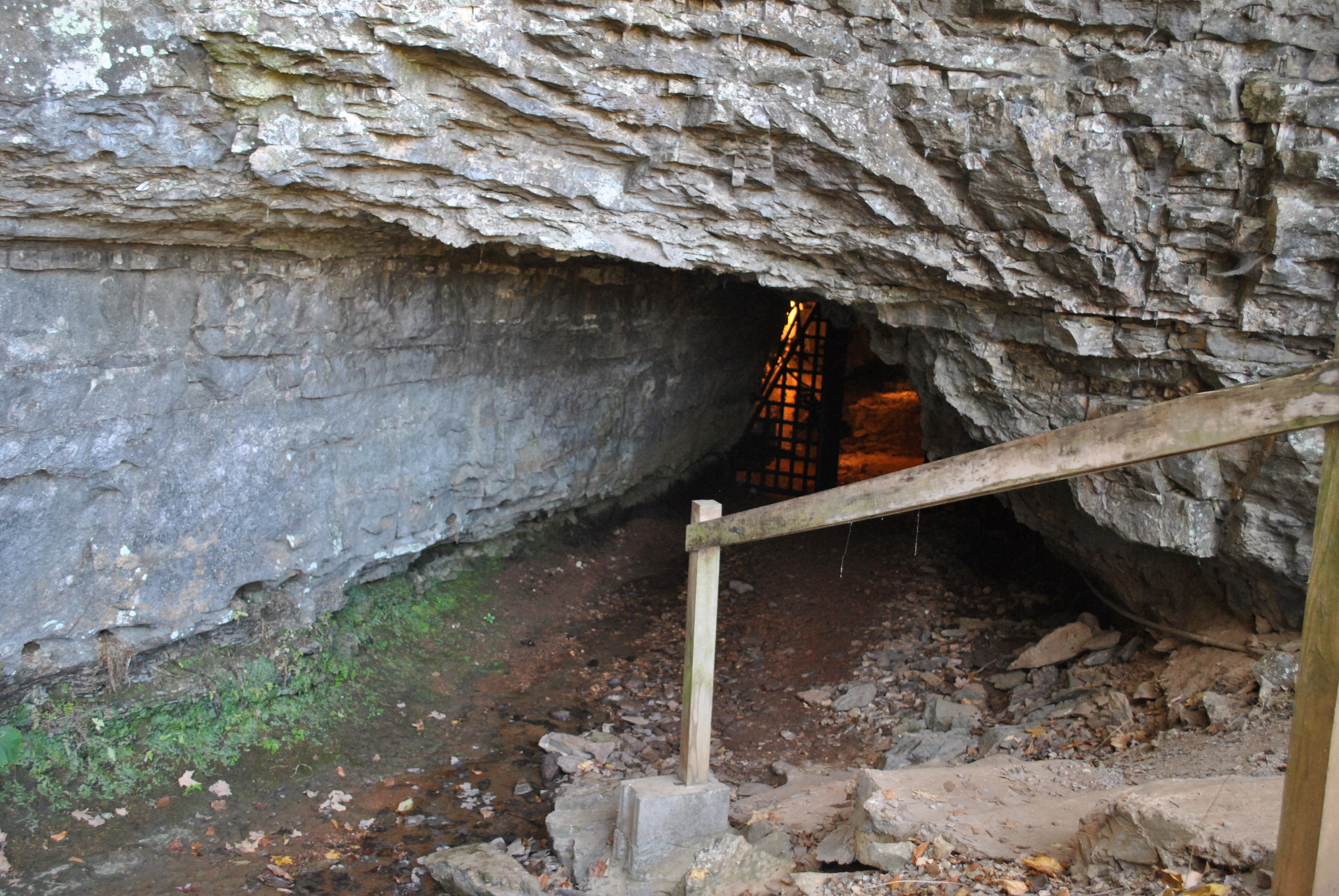

- Location within Tennessee Location within the United States
- Location: Robertson County, Tennessee, U.S.
- Coordinates: 36°35′29″N 87°3′20″W
- Area: 2.4 acres (0.97 ha)
- NRHP reference No.: 08000237
- Added to NRHP: March 21, 2008

The Bell Witch Cave is a karst cave located in Robertson County, Tennessee near the city of Adams, where the Bell Farm once stood. The cave is approximately 490 feet (150 m) long. The cave is privately owned, and tours are given during the summer months and in October.

This cave has been associated with the haunting of the Bell Witch, a period during which the Bell family was allegedly haunted by an entity now referred to as the "Bell Witch." The cave is located on property once owned by the Bell family. Many believe that when the witch departed the family, she fled to the sanctuary of this cave.

In the particular legend in which the cave is featured, young Betsy Bell and some of her friends had gone to explore the cave. While they were there, one of the boys crawled into a hole and became stuck. A voice cried out, "I'll get him out!" The boy felt hands grasping his feet, and he was pulled out of the hole. The supposed entity (still invisible), then gave the young explorers a lecture on reckless cave exploring.

According to science writer Brian Dunning, while the cave is close to the Bell family homestead, it did not play any role in the original Bell Witch stories. The alleged cave adventures by the Bell children were created and written many years after the event.
