= Ricky Bell =

Ricky Bell may refer to:

- Ricky Bell (running back) (1955–1984), American football running back
- Ricky Bell (defensive back) (1974–2011), American football defensive back
- Ricky Bell (singer) (born 1967), R&B singer for New Edition and Bell Biv DeVoe
- Ricky Bell (politician) (born 1963), Leader of Glasgow City Council as of September 2026

== See also ==
- Richard Bell (disambiguation)
