= Dick Bell (footballer) =

Scottish footballer

Personal information
- Full name: Richard Bell
- Place of birth: Greenock, Scotland
- Height: 5 ft 10 in (1.78 m)
- Position: Inside forward

Youth career
- Dawdon Juniors

Senior career*
Years	Team	Apps	(Gls)
1935	Port Glasgow Athletic Juniors		
1935–1937	Sunderland	1	(0)
1937–1939	West Ham United	1	(1)
- * Club domestic league appearances and goals

Richard Bell was a Scottish professional footballer who played as an inside forward in the Football League for Sunderland and West Ham United.

After a single appearance for Sunderland, Bell joined West Ham, then of the Second Division, and scored on his only League appearance for the club.

Bell signed up with the Essex Regiment of the Territorial Army in April 1939 and served with the Royal Artillery during World War II. He played as a wartime guest for Clapham and Southend United.
