= The Denver Times =

Daily newspaper in Colorado, US (1872–1926)

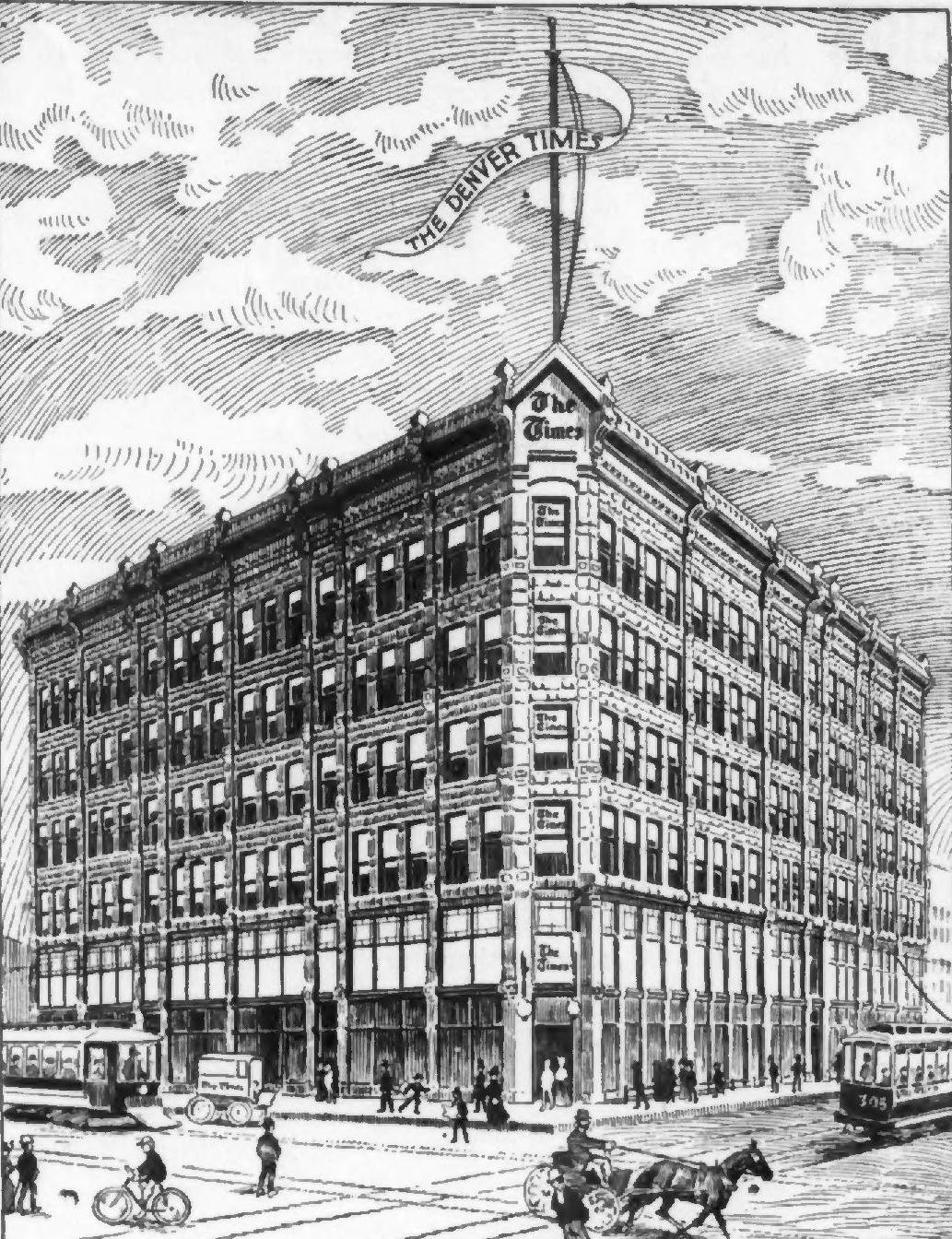
- The offices of The Denver Times from 1901 till 1926
- Type: Daily
- Founded: April 1, 1872
- Ceased publication: November 22, 1926
- Headquarters: Denver, Colorado

The Denver Times was a daily newspaper in Denver, Colorado, published from April 1, 1872, to November 22, 1926. It was merged into the Rocky Mountain News in 1926.
