= American Ghost Society =

The American Ghost Society is a paranormal investigative group which spans the entirety of North America. It was founded in 1995 by Troy and Amy Taylor in Alton, Illinois as the Ghost Society of Central Illinois, but was renamed in 1996. The society began holding annual conferences in the same year. By 1999 the group had 2,500 members.

The society focuses on using supposedly scientific methods for ghost hunting rather than seances or psychic readings. The use of digital cameras is also barred by the organisation. The society offers certificates and training in ghost hunting.

The American Ghost Society also publishes the quarterly magazine Ghosts of the Prairie and operates the largest online bookstore dedicated to the supernatural.
