= Adams, Tennessee =

- City
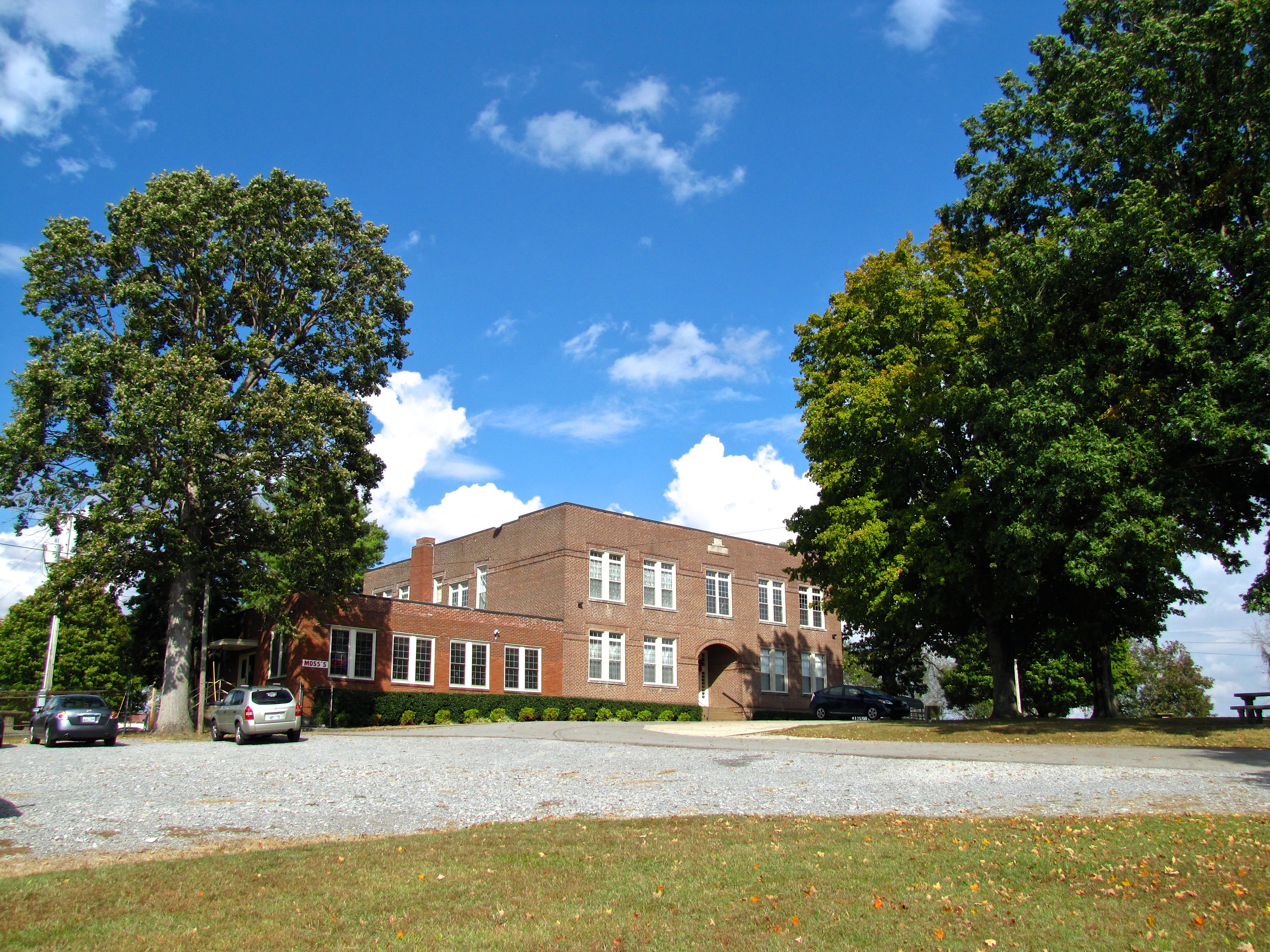
- The old Bell School building, now city hall

- Location of Adams in Robertson County, Tennessee.

- Location within Tennessee Location within the United States Location within North America
- Coordinates: 36°34′56″N 87°03′56″W
- Country: United States
- State: Tennessee
- County: Robertson
- Incorporated: 1963

Government
  - Mayor: Robert W. Evans

Area
  - Total: 2.39 sq mi (6.19 km^{2})
  - Land: 2.39 sq mi (6.19 km^{2})
  - Water: 0 sq mi (0.00 km^{2})
- Elevation: 548 ft (167 m)

Population (2020)
  - Total: 624
  - Estimate (2024): 666 ▲
  - Density: 261.0/sq mi (100.78/km^{2})
- Time zone: UTC-6 (Central (CST))
  - Summer (DST): UTC-5 (CDT)
- ZIP code: 37010
- Area code(s): 615, 629
- FIPS code: 47-00200
- GNIS feature ID: 1304763
- Website: adamstennessee.net

Adams is a city in Robertson County, Tennessee, United States. It is near the Kentucky state line. The population was 624 at the 2020 census.

== History ==
The first settlers in what is now Adams arrived in the late 18th century. The Red River Baptist Church, one of the first churches founded west of the Cumberland Plateau, was built on the banks of the Red River in 1791. The congregation relocated to its current location on Church Street in 1898.

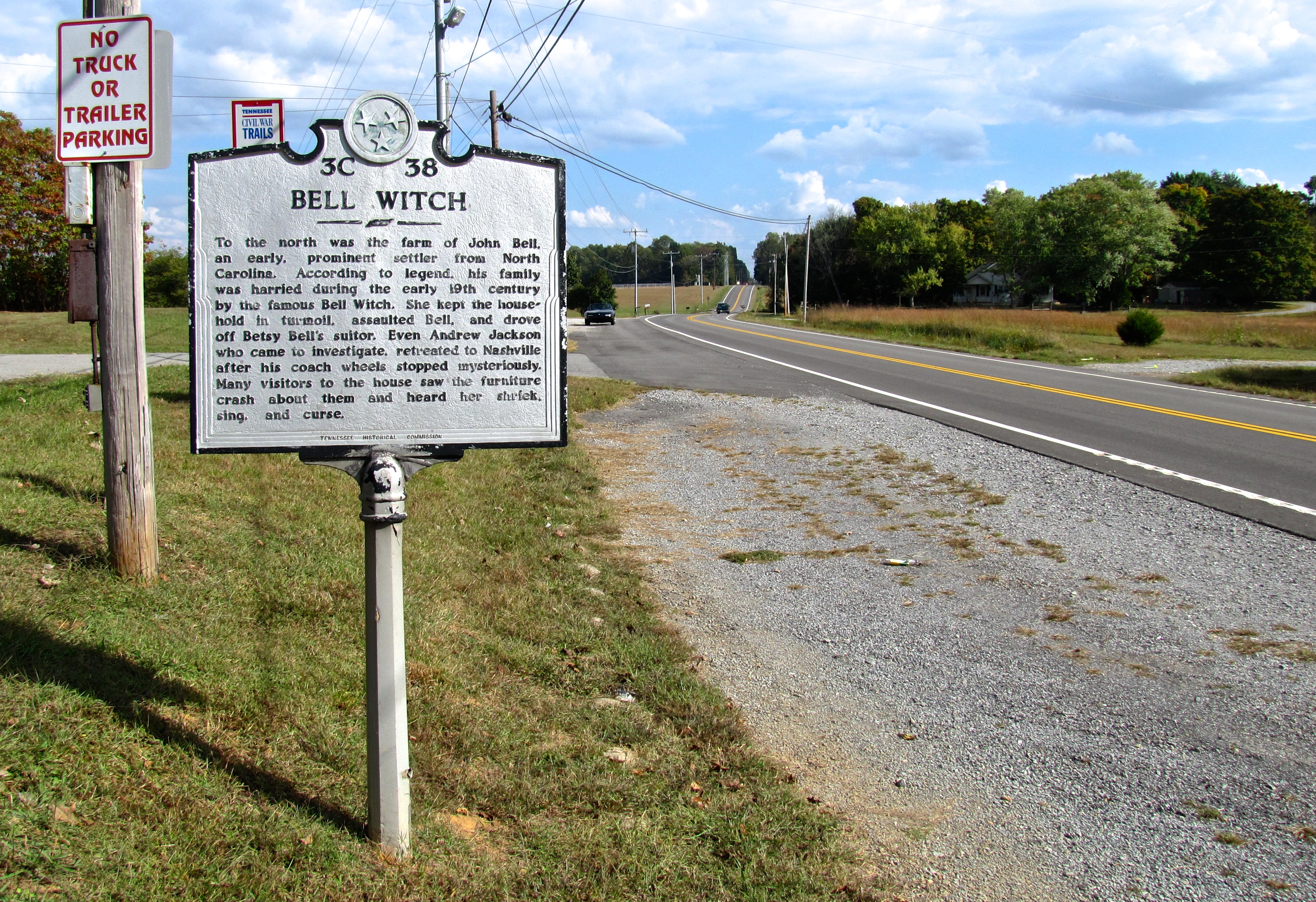
THC marker along US 41 in Adams recalling the Bell Witch haunting

Adams developed in the late 1850s as a station on the Edgefield and Kentucky Railroad (later part of the L&N system). Most of the city's early buildings were destroyed during the Civil War. The city originally incorporated as Red River in 1869, but was renamed Adams Station in honor of James Reuben Adams, who owned much of the land on which the city was built. The name was simplified to "Adams" in 1898. By the late 1880s, Adams was home to several stores, a flour mill, two churches, and a school. The city repealed its charter in 1899, but reincorporated in 1908, and incorporated as a city in 1963.

During the 1920s, Adams began to receive a steady flow of automobile traffic due to its location along U.S. Route 41, which was one of the main roads linking the Chicago area with Florida. The city began to decline in the mid-20th century with the discontinuance of passenger rail traffic and the construction of Interstate 24 and Interstate 65 (which drew much of the automobile traffic away from US 41).

Adams is the site of an infamous haunting, the Bell Witch. The first manifestations of the Bell Witch haunting supposedly occurred in 1817 through 1820 on a farm owned by John Bell. A memorial to the Bell family can be found at Bellwood Cemetery. The city's municipal offices are now located in the former Bell School, which was built in 1920 and named for a descendant of John Bell. A log cabin built by John Bell around 1810 has been relocated to a plot across from the Bell School.

== Geography ==
The city is situated in northwestern Robertson County at the intersection of U.S. Route 41, which connects Adams with Springfield to the southeast and Guthrie, Kentucky, to the northwest, and State Route 76, which connects Adams with Clarksville to the southwest. The city's boundaries stretch northward and westward to the Red River, a tributary of the Cumberland River.

According to the United States Census Bureau, the city has a total area of 2.5 square miles (6.5 km^{2}), all land.

== Demographics ==
Historical population
Census	Pop.	Note	%±
1880	237		—
1890	234		−1.3%
1910	542		—
1920	672		24.0%
1930	512		−23.8%
1970	458		—
1980	600		31.0%
1990	587		−2.2%
2000	566		−3.6%
2010	633		11.8%
2020	624		−1.4%
2024 (est.)	666		6.7%

=== 2020 census ===
As of the 2020 census, Adams had a population of 624, with 232 households and 138 families residing in the city. The median age was 40.5 years; 21.5% of residents were under the age of 18 and 19.1% were 65 years of age or older. For every 100 females there were 98.7 males, and for every 100 females age 18 and over there were 96.8 males age 18 and over.

0.0% of residents lived in urban areas, while 100.0% lived in rural areas.

There were 232 households in Adams, of which 36.2% had children under the age of 18 living in them. Of all households, 46.6% were married-couple households, 16.4% were households with a male householder and no spouse or partner present, and 25.0% were households with a female householder and no spouse or partner present. About 21.6% of all households were made up of individuals and 10.3% had someone living alone who was 65 years of age or older.

There were 250 housing units, of which 7.2% were vacant. The homeowner vacancy rate was 0.0% and the rental vacancy rate was 0.0%.

Racial composition as of the 2020 census
Race	Number	Percent
White	553	88.6%
Black or African American	22	3.5%
American Indian and Alaska Native	7	1.1%
Asian	2	0.3%
Native Hawaiian and Other Pacific Islander	0	0.0%
Some other race	11	1.8%
Two or more races	29	4.6%
Hispanic or Latino (of any race)	16	2.6%

=== 2000 census ===
As of the census of 2000, there was a population of 566, with 203 households and 158 families residing in the city. The population density was 231.2 inhabitants per square mile (89.3/km^{2}). There were 230 housing units at an average density of 94.0 per square mile (36.3/km^{2}). The racial makeup of the city was 90.11% White, 8.48% African American, 0.18% Native American, 0.35% Asian, 0.88% from other races. Hispanic or Latino of any race were 1.94% of the population.

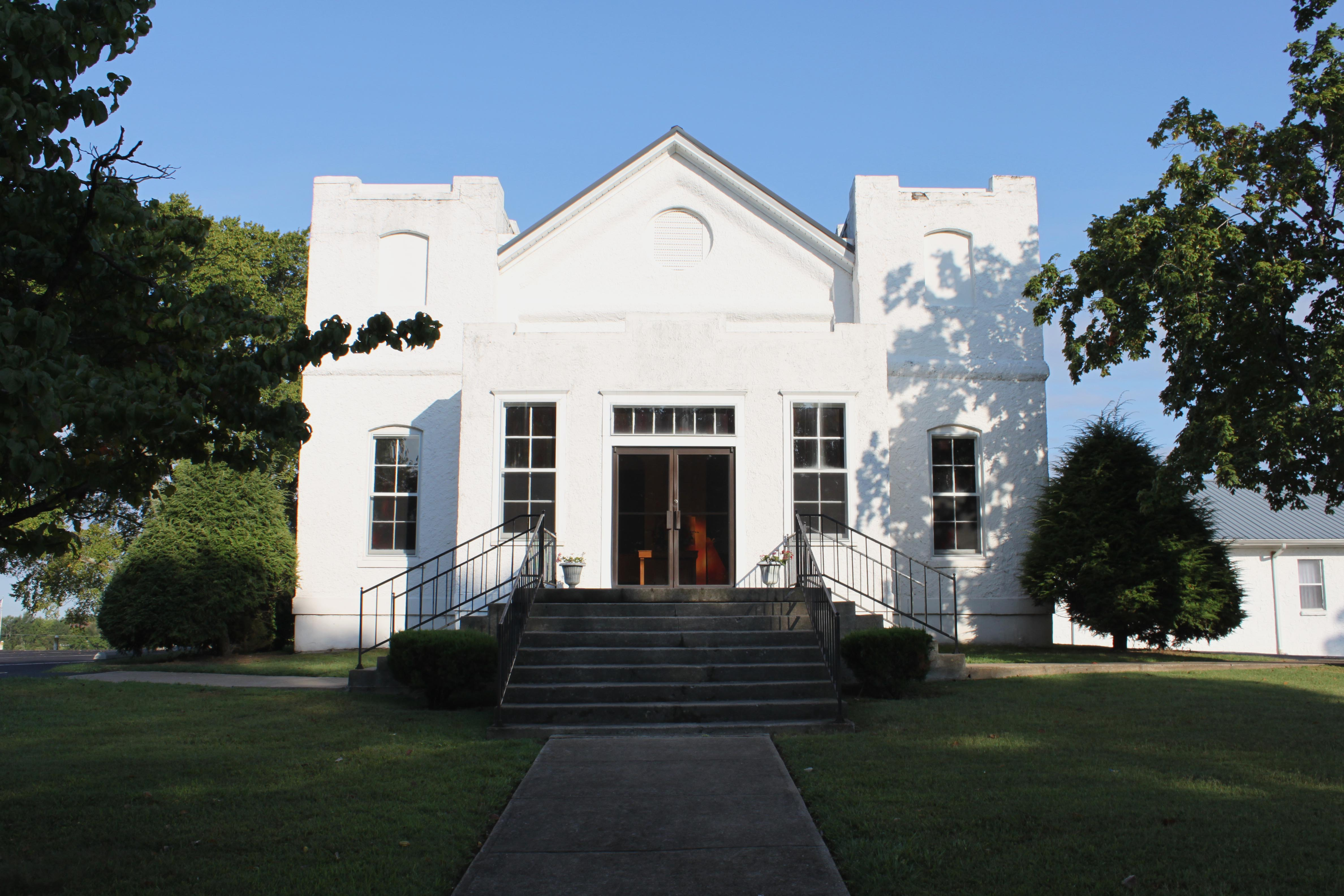
Red River Baptist Church

There were 203 households, out of which 41.4% had children under the age of 18 living with them, 59.1% were married couples living together, 15.8% had a female householder with no husband present, and 21.7% were non-families. 17.7% of all households were made up of individuals, and 11.8% had someone living alone who was 65 years of age or older. The average household size was 2.79 and the average family size was 3.13.

In the city, the population was spread out, with 29.2% under the age of 18, 8.1% from 18 to 24, 26.7% from 25 to 44, 23.7% from 45 to 64, and 12.4% who were 65 years of age or older. The median age was 35 years. For every 100 females, there were 93.8 males. For every 100 females age 18 and over, there were 88.3 males.

The median income for a household in the city was $32,500, and the median income for a family was $40,179. Males had a median income of $31,932 versus $21,190 for females. The per capita income for the city was $15,067. About 6.3% of families and 12.5% of the population were below the poverty line, including 18.2% of those under age 18 and 7.4% of those age 65 or over.

== Government ==
As of 2025, the Adams City Commission consists of the following members:

Adams City Commission
Position	Name
Mayor	Robert W. Evans
Vice Mayor	Megan Baird
Commissioner	Tyler Estep
City Manager	Anna Redfern
City Recorder	Leslie Phelps
