= Anderson Cheatham =

American politician

Anderson Cheatham was an American politician from Tennessee.

== Early life ==
With his family, including seven brothers, he moved from Virginia to Robertson County, Tennessee, becoming one of the first settlers in the county. One of his brothers was Richard Cheatham (1799-1845), who served as Tennessee member of the United States House of Representatives from 1837 to 1839.

== Career ==
He served in the Tennessee House of Representatives from 1801 to 1809, then from 1819 to 1821 and again from 1823 to 1825.

== Legacy ==
He was the uncle of Edward Saunders Cheatham (1818-1878), who served in both the Tennessee House of Representatives and the Tennessee Senate, Richard Boone Cheatham (1824-1877), who served as Mayor of Nashville, Tennessee from 1960 to 1962, and Boyd M. Cheatham, a member of the Tennessee House of Representatives.

He was also the grandfather of Benjamin F. Cheatham, (1820–1886), a General in the Confederate States Army.
