= Kitty Cheatham =

American musician and actor (1864-1946)

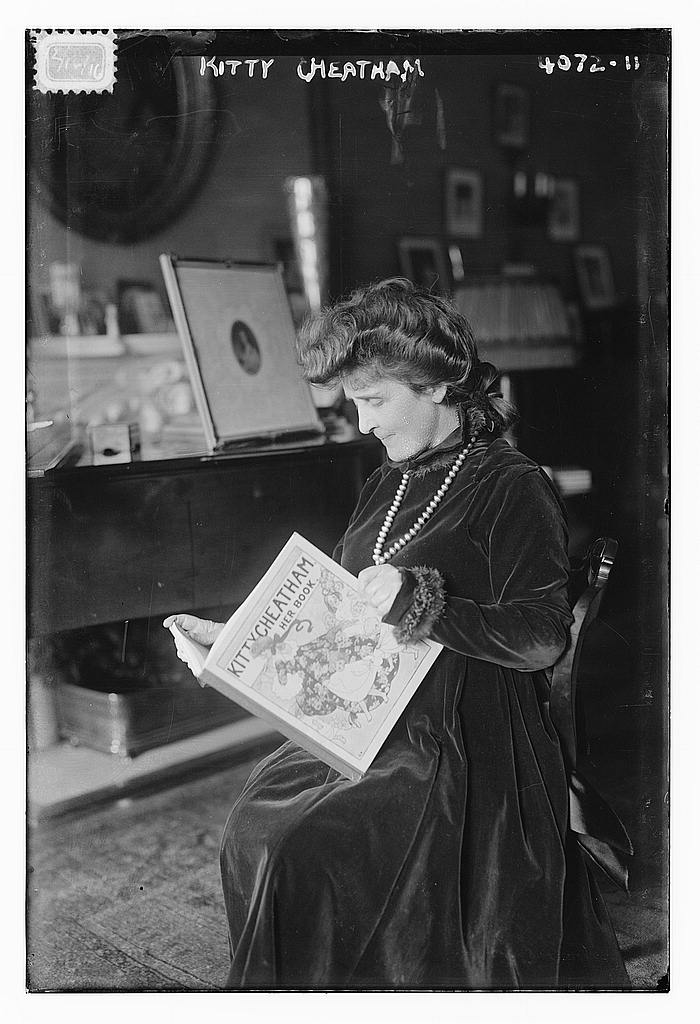
- Kitty Cheatham in 1916
- Born: Catharine Smiley Cheatham; 1864; Nashville, Tennessee, U.S.
- Died: January 5, 1946 (aged 81–82); Greenwich, Connecticut, U.S.
- Resting place: Mount Olivet Cemetery; Nashville, Tennessee, U.S.
- Occupation: Singer
- Spouse: William Henry Thomson
- Parent(s): Richard Boone Cheatham; Frances Ann Bugg
- Relatives: Richard Cheatham (paternal grandfather); Edward Saunders Cheatham (paternal uncle); Boyd M. Cheatham (paternal uncle)

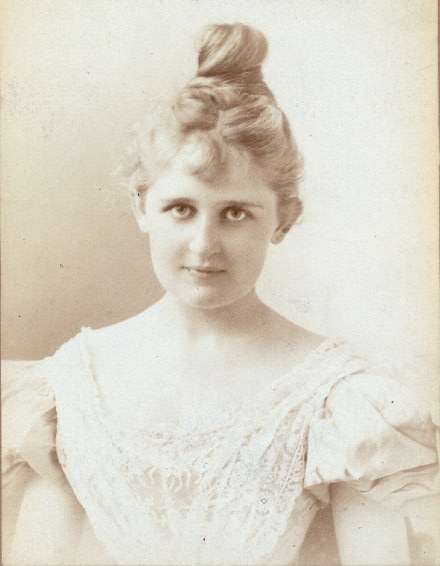
Kitty Cheatham

Catharine Smiley Cheatham (1864 – January 5, 1946) was an American singer and monologist.

== Early life ==
Cheatham was born in Nashville, Tennessee in 1864. Her father, Richard Boone Cheatham, was a Tennessee politician who was the mayor of Nashville from 1860 to 1862, and her mother was Frances Ann Bugg.

Cheatham began her career in music at age 14 by performing at First Presbyterian Church in Nashville. She later went on to study in New York City, Paris, and Berlin.

== Career ==
As a vocalist, she gave her debut international performance in London, England in 1904 where she performed renditions of African-American folk songs. She is credited with having helped preserve these traditional songs and bring them to European audiences. While in London, she was introduced to and befriended members of the British royal family, for whom she would go on to perform many times. However, it is her contributions to children's music for which Cheatham is best known as a musician, as she became popular throughout the world by performing children's songs and stories. During her career, she performed for thousands in England, France, Germany, and the United States, and organized children's concerts for the New York Philharmonic and the Philadelphia Orchestra. She published two collections of her songs, Kitty Cheatham: Her Book in 1915, and A Nursery Garland in 1917. Her repertoire included over 1,000 songs in nine languages.

Many of the songs she sang expressed themes of Christianity and American patriotism. A member of the Christian Science church (and a friend of its founder, Mary Baker Eddy), Cheatham was highly religious, and she wrote a number of religiously and patriotically oriented publications.

Cheatham was also a speaker who created a series of "illustrated lectures" which focused on her travels throughout Europe. On June 28, 1930, she was invited by Alþing, the parliament of Iceland, to give a speech at their country's Millennial Celebrations. She also spoke before the delegates of the International Women's Congress, of which she was the honorary vice-president, in Budapest, Hungary in 1937.

== Personal life and death ==
Cheatham married William Henry Thomson on June 9, 1894.

Cheatham died on January 5, 1946, in Greenwich, Connecticut. She was buried in Mount Olivet Cemetery in Nashville, Tennessee.
