= Mansfield Cheatham House =

Historic house in Tennessee, United States

- U.S. National Register of Historic Places
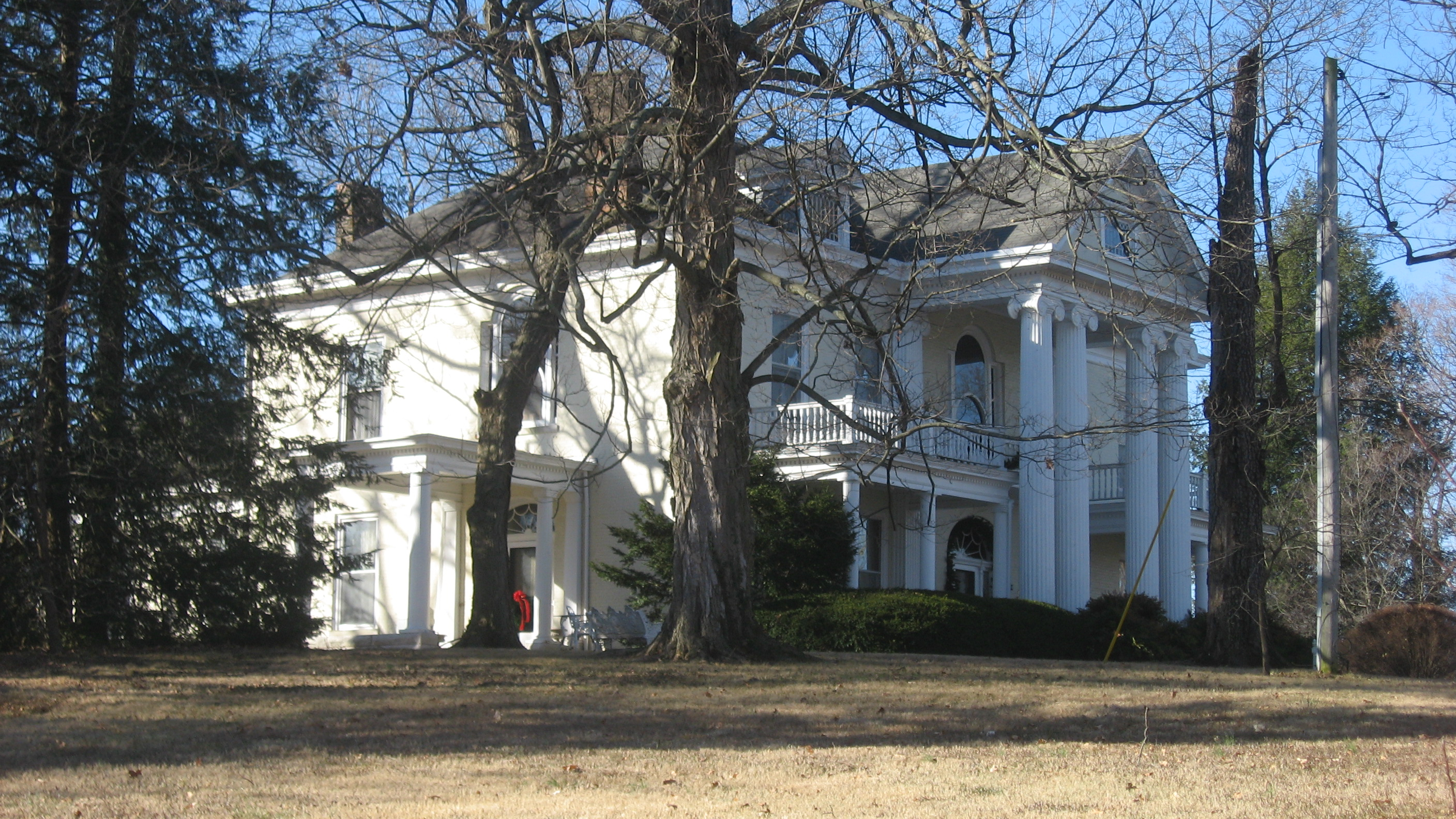

- Location within Tennessee
- Location: 7th Ave., W., Springfield, Tennessee
- Coordinates: 36°30′35″N 86°53′29″W
- Area: 1 acre (0.40 ha)
- Built: 1833
- Architectural style: Neo-Classic
- NRHP reference No.: 78002626
- Added to NRHP: January 30, 1978

The Mansfield Cheatham House is a historic mansion in Springfield, Tennessee, U.S..

== History ==
The house was built for Richard Cheatham and his wife, Susan Sanders, circa 1833. It was inherited by their son, Edward Saunders Cheatham. After he died, it was inherited by his brother, Richard Boone Cheatham. In 1878, it was purchased by Cornelia Benton. A decade later, in 1888, it was purchased by Professor J. W. Huey. It served as a public school until it was purchased by W. H. Simmons.

It has been listed on the National Register of Historic Places since January 30, 1978.
