= Robertson County Courthouse =

Robertson County Courthouse may refer to:

- Robertson County Courthouse (Kentucky), Mount Olivet, Kentucky
- Robertson County Courthouse (Tennessee), Springfield, Tennessee
- Robertson County Courthouse and Jail, Franklin, Texas, listed on the National Register of Historic Places
