= Charles Hartmann =

American jazz musician

Charles "Charlie" Hartmann (1 July 1898 - 1 September 1982) was a New Orleans jazz trombonist.

Hartmann was born in New Orleans on July 1, 1898. Hartmann played with the bands of Johnny Bayersdorffer, Tony Parenti, and Johnny Wiggs. He was secretary of Local 174 of the American Federation of Musicians for many years. Charles Hartman died in Springfield, Tennessee.
