= Paul Henderson (photojournalist) =

Paul Samuel Henderson
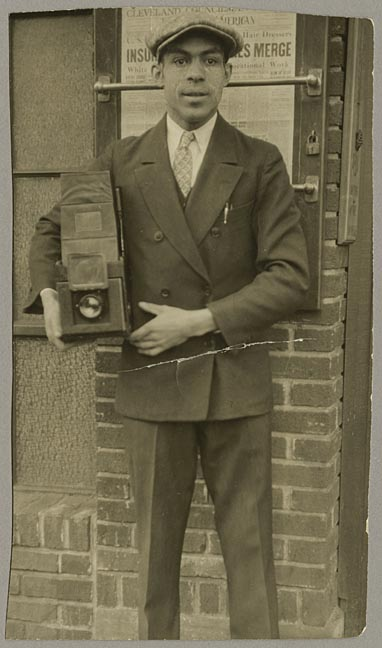
- Paul Henderson with camera
- Born: Paul Samuel Henderson; October 10, 1899; Springfield, Tennessee, United States
- Died: May 24, 1988 (aged 88); Baltimore, Maryland, United States
- Known for: Photographer

Paul Samuel Henderson (October 10, 1899 – May 24, 1988) was an African-American photojournalist for the Baltimore Afro-American newspaper from 1929 through c. 1960. He became well known for taking pictures of large groups and distant objects atop a ladder he carried. Henderson primarily photographed people, including church groups, politicians, graduations, local college and university groups, weddings, events during the Civil Rights Movement, and more. He was a member of the National Association for the Advancement of Colored People, a vestryman at St. James Church, charter member of the Druid Hill Avenue Neighborhood Club, assistant treasurer of a local Frontiers International club, and supported The Salvation Army.

== Early life ==
Henderson was born on October 10, 1899, in Springfield, Tennessee, and was the youngest of four children born to Ike A. and Annie L. Henderson. At age 18 he registered for the World War I draft on September 12, 1918, while working as a bricklayer for a steel company in Gary, Indiana. In 1920 his profession changed to driver for a laundry in Gary. At some point during his residence in Gary, he attended the School for Professional Photography.

== Photography career ==
After leaving Indiana, Henderson worked for a newspaper in Roanoke, Virginia. Henderson moved to Baltimore in 1929 and became what the Baltimore Afro-American newspaper called their first photographer. Henderson used a large format view camera to produce glass negatives, and eight by ten inch and four by five inch acetate negatives.

Henderson documented racial segregation and early civil rights protests as well as community members of the Baltimore City's African-American population. Henderson photographed National Association for the Advancement of Colored People Baltimore Branch president Lillie Mae Carroll Jackson, Baltimore City Mayor and Maryland State Governor Theodore McKeldin, Supreme Court Justice Thurgood Marshall when he was a lawyer for the NAACP, journalist and publisher Carl Murphy, businesses and people along Pennsylvania Avenue, which was once a main artery for black culture and life in Baltimore and much more.

=== Photograph collection ===
Henderson bequeathed his photograph and object collection to the Peale Museum. When the Peale closed its doors in 1997, the collection was transferred to the Maryland Historical Society.

== Personal life ==
In 1930, Henderson married schoolteacher and “prominent society girl” Elizabeth Johnson. Mrs. Henderson was a graduate of Douglass High School and Coppin Normal School for Teachers (now Coppin State University) in Baltimore whose career flourished in the Baltimore City Public School system. Paul and Elizabeth Henderson had no children.

In 1966 Henderson became so gravely ill that on January 22, the Baltimore Afro-American printed a premature obituary for him. However, in the same issue, the newspaper asks readers for prayers for Henderson who had been in Hopkins Hospital for the past week. In April 1966, the newspaper’s Bettye M. Moss updates readers in her column about Henderson’s condition, stating that he is able to be “up and about” at the Bolton Hill Nursing Home at Lafayette Avenue and John Street in Baltimore. By June the Afro-American reports that Henderson is back at home at 1925 Druid Hill Avenue in Baltimore.

Henderson died on Tuesday, May 24, 1988, at Union Memorial Hospital after a reported battle with an illness. Services were held at St. James Episcopal Church at Lafayette and Arlington avenues. He had outlived his wife Elizabeth, who died in 1982. His obituary stated that he was survived by his brother, Willard Henderson, who lived in Tampa, Florida.
