= Springfield High School (Tennessee) =

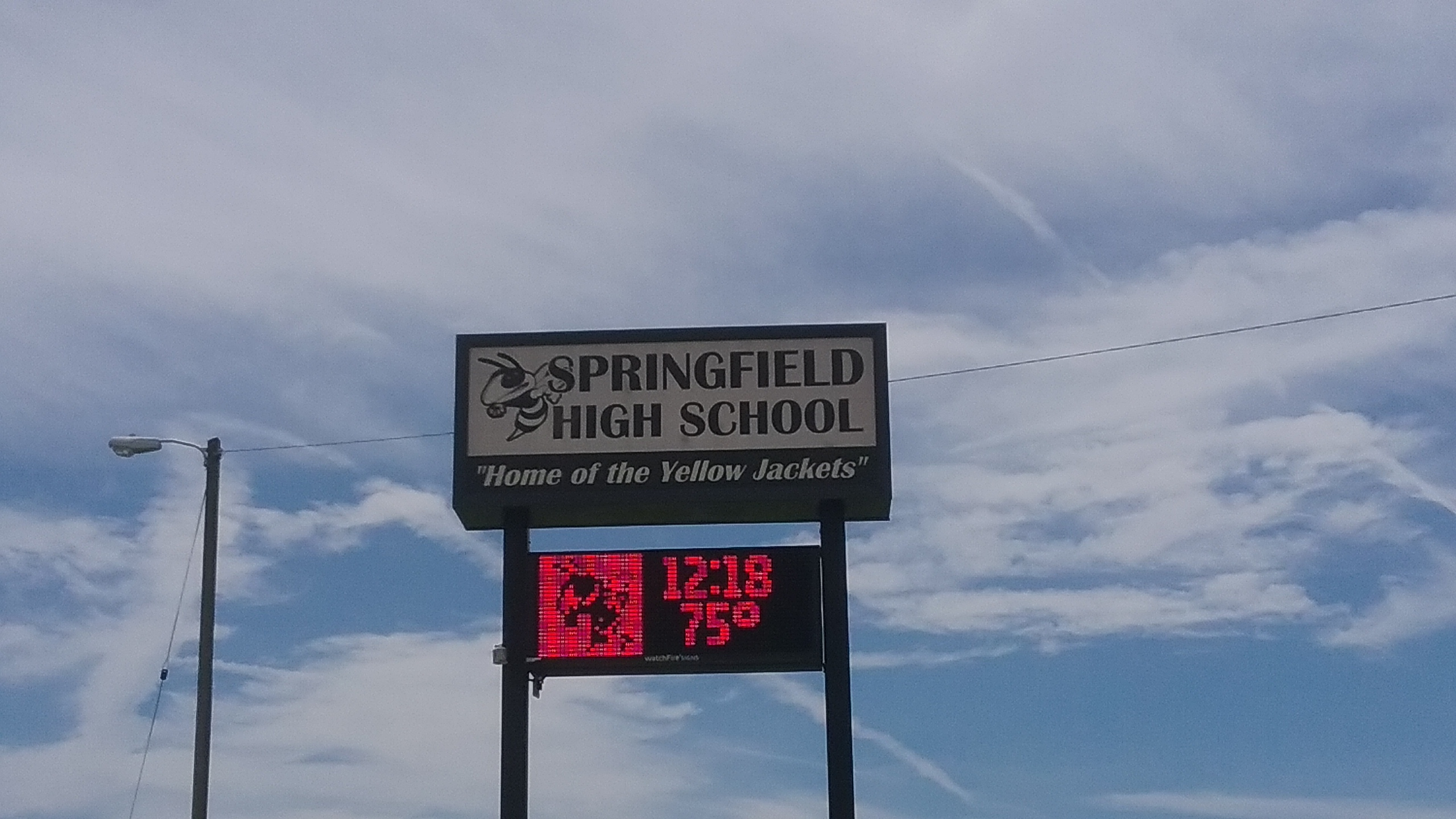
- Springfield High School sign

Location
- 5240 Highway 76 East; Springfield, Tennessee 37172; United States
- Coordinates: 36.510°N 86.856°W

Information
- Other names: SHS
- Type: Public high school
- School district: Robertson County Schools
- Principal: Chris Tucker
- Grades: 9–12
- Enrollment: 1,132 (2023–24)
- Colors: Gold and white
- Team name: Yellow Jackets
- Newspaper: The Yellow Jacket
- Website: shs.rcstn.net

Springfield High School is a public high school located in Springfield, Tennessee, serving students in grades 9-12.

== Academics and ratings ==
Springfield High School’s overall academic performance on standardized tests is below state averages, particularly in math proficiency, where approximately 9% of students score at or above proficiency compared to a Tennessee average of around 34%. Reading/language arts proficiency is also below the state level at about 29%.

The school is ranked in the bottom 50% of Tennessee high schools based on combined test scores, with an overall testing rank of 1,372 out of 1,728 schools statewide. Springfield High School has a GreatSchools rating of 3 out of 10, reflecting statewide standardized test performance that trails the state average.

According to Niche, Springfield High School receives a C academically, with a reported graduation rate of about 85%. The average ACT score for the school in 2025 was a 16.4.

== Campus ==
Prior to 1925, the school was located on Main Street on the property where "The Center", the recreational center in Springfield, is located. In 1925, the school moved to the former campus of Peoples-Tucker School, which had been closed. The school remained on that campus until 1982 when it was moved to Highway 76 East at its present location.

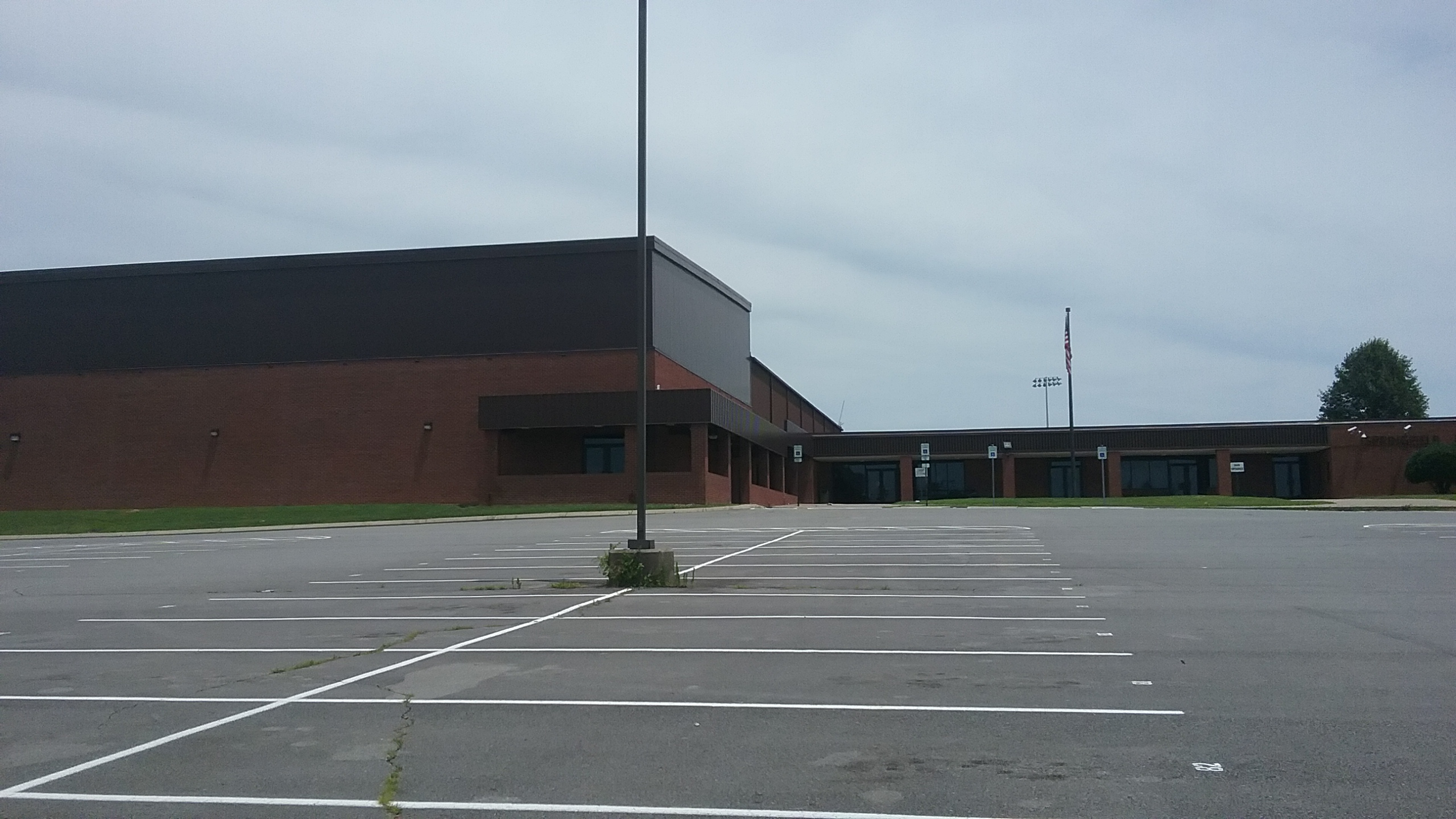
Front of the present day Highway 76 East campus with the gymnasium on the left

=== Organization ===
Springfield High School consists of three main buildings: the main building, the vocational building, and the workout room.

The main building is divided into four separate halls (A, B, C, D, M, and V).

- A-Hall contains computer classes, some mathematics classes, some Technology Department, the History Department, and the Guidance Department,
- B-Hall contains the Social Sciences Department, some of the Art Department, and the English Department, in addition to most of the Foreign Language Department and the Yearbook Room.
- C-Hall contains most of the Art Department, most of the Music Department, some of the Foreign Language Department,
- D-Hall contains the Mathematics Department, Auditorium, Choir, in addition to most of the Technological/Business Department.
- E-Hall contains the Science Department and the Theater control Balcony
- M-Hall Contains most of the English Department, the library, Few Mathematics classes, Guidance Department and leads to the cafeteria.
- The Vocational Building (V-Hall) contains Auto Mechanics, Agri-science, Culinary, Nursing, Construction and Criminal Justice Departments

=== Renovations and additions ===
Efforts to expand the school, merging the main and vocational buildings, began in early 2007. Among the additions to the school were a multi-story extension of B-Hall, a new Lecture Hall, a new gymnasium, and new offices. Construction finished in 2009.

On November 16, 2016, construction began on a new on-campus football and soccer field, which was completed in time to host its first game on August 25, 2017, against Clarksville. Prior to this the school played home games at nearby Springfield Middle School.

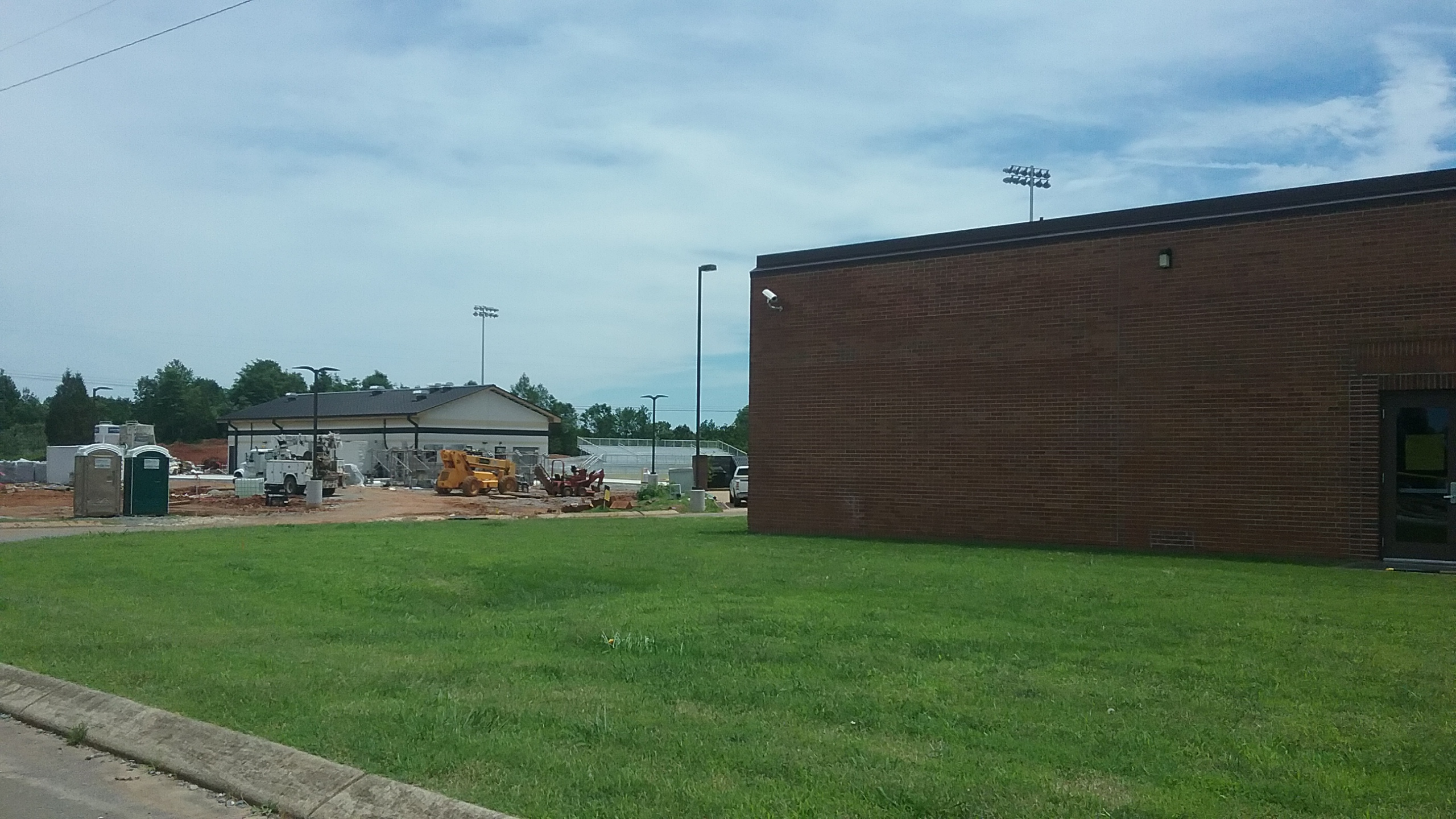
The school's football field near completion in June 2017

== Athletics ==
The football team began in 1911. The school's former football stadium, opened in 1939, is named for coach W. Boyce Smith, who coached from 1928–1971 and compiled a record of 288–166–34 (a winning percentage of 69.6%).

The 1993 Yellow Jacket football team won the TSSAA state championship in Class 3A, defeating McMinn Central 28–6 at Vanderbilt Stadium, to finish with a record of 13–2.

In December 2017, Springfield High School played in the 4-A State Championship at Tennessee Tech. They were beaten by Greeneville High School with a 54–13 score.

In December 2019, Springfield High School played in the 4-A State Championship at Tennessee Tech. They were defeated by Elizabethton High School with a score of 30–6.
