= Bill Sanders =

American political cartoonist (1930–2021)

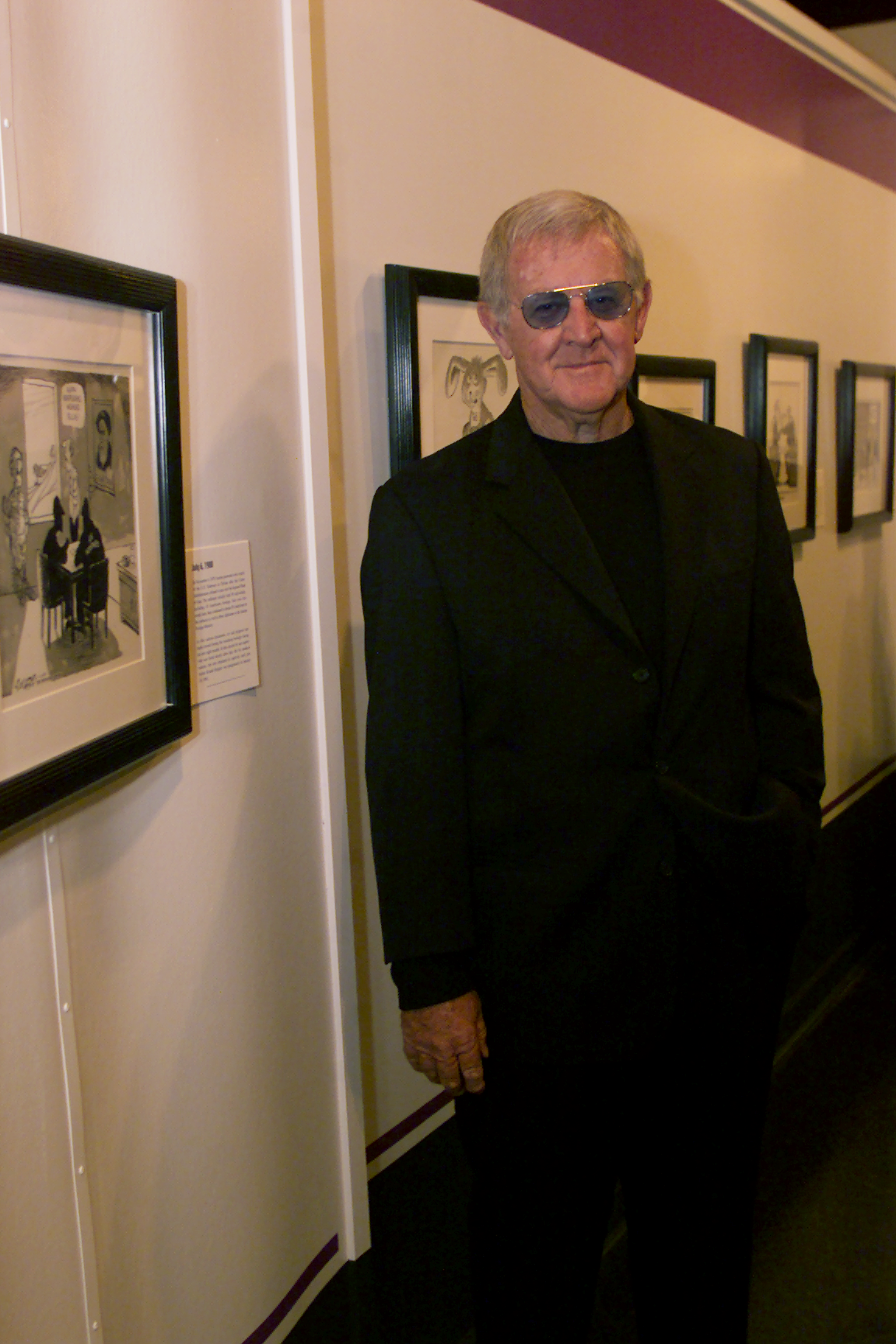
Sanders in 2010

William Willard Sanders (October 14, 1930 – February 27, 2021) was an American political cartoonist and author known for his cartoons and commentary on civil liberties and civil rights.

== Early life, education and family ==
Sanders was born on October 14, 1930, in Springfield, Tennessee, where he spent his early childhood. His parents moved to Pompano Beach, Florida, where he was an All-State basketball player for Pompano Beach High School and played quarterback for the football team. He attended Western Kentucky University on a football scholarship and established a single season NCAA passing record, completing 66.7% of his passes in 1953. At WKU, he met and married Joyce Wallace. They have four daughters, Cathy, Vicky, Cheryl and Denese.

== Career ==
Sanders served in the U.S. Army in Korea as a mortar platoon leader and, later, as the commanding officer of the Pacific Stars and Stripes Army Unit in Seoul (1955–1957). He took his separation from the Army in Japan and worked as a Department of the Army civilian reporter-artist for Pacific Stars and Stripes in Tokyo (1957–1958). During this same period, he freelanced political cartoons to The Japan Times. Returning to the U.S., he was hired by the Greensboro Daily News as a political cartoonist (1959–1963). He then moved to the Kansas City Star (1963–1967), where he was nationally syndicated. The Milwaukee Journal hired Sanders in 1967, and he worked there until his retirement in 1991. He moved to Ft. Myers, Florida, where he drew and wrote for his blog, Sanders Cartoon-Commentary.

== Controversy and attacks ==
Sanders career has been marked by controversy. His first published cartoon after college was a comic strip for the 8th Army base newspaper in Seoul, which was terminated by the commanding general because one of the episodes involved the general and a Korean prostitute.

Shortly after he started work for The Kansas City Star, the Letters Editor said that Sanders had “caused more letters in a month then we've had in the last five years.” In an interview with Holiday magazine, Star columnist Bill Vaughn said readers would suddenly “call us up in the middle of the night, denouncing us as comsymps, nigger lovers and pree-verts.”

The John Birch Society mounted an unsuccessful campaign to cancel 10,000 Star subscriptions. The controversy drew national media attention. Editor & Publisher magazine published a two-page feature under the headline, “Cartoonist Suffers Fringe Harassment.” Saturday Review, in an article titled “When Extremists Attack the Press” said Sanders’ “editorial commentaries can make the opposition gag on its breakfast.” Sanders added to the controversy surrounding him when he sued a local Catholic Church for disturbing the peace with its early morning bell ringing.

When Sanders moved to The Milwaukee Journal, he came into conflict with Milwaukee Mayor Henry Maier over Milwaukee's lack of an open housing ordinance. The Mayor said the Journal Company “has indulged again in the abuse of a bully boy personal attack by their cartoonist.” After being called “Colonel” by the mayor, Sanders attended a press conference dressed as a Kentucky Colonel carrying a chicken bucket containing his sketchpad. WITI-TV editorialized that this conflict “is doing serious disservice to the people.” Sanders was suspended for two weeks after his drawing of a local judge as a pregnant girl scout appeared in Kaleidoscope, a Milwaukee alternative newspaper. After the 1984 election campaigns, Wisconsin Governor Lee Dreyfus criticized The Milwaukee Journal for its political cartoonist “who plays the hillbilly kid while living in Elm Grove.”

His cartoons critical of the way Milwaukee police officers seemed to fade into anonymity after disputed arrest tactics resulted in the editor of the police newsletter coming into the Journal contact editor’s office calling Sanders “a dirty, filthy man,” and demanding to know why the Journal kept “pigs” on the paper. In a feature article on Sanders, Newsweek described him as the “Milwaukee Journal’s ornery and unorthodox house cartoonist,” whose “stinging bite rivals that of Herblock.”

In addition to national syndication, his cartoons were frequently reprinted in Time, Newsweek, The New York Times, The London Observer and Izvestia. He contributed animated political cartoons to The Morning News on CBS-TV, 1975. He covered the Vietnam War as a reporter-artist just prior to the Tet Offensive.

== Honors ==
He received the Kansas City Civil Liberties Achievement Award (1963), the International Solon of Cartoon Award (1975), the National Headliners Award (1977), the United Nations Population Institute Award for the best cartoon on women's rights (1975), the Wisconsin Civil Liberties Award (1979) and the National Endowment for the Humanities Fellowship to study technology in a democratic society at Georgia Tech (1979). He has been inducted into the Milwaukee Press Club Hall of Fame and the Distinguished Alumni Hall of Fame at Western Kentucky University. His cartoon originals have been collected and hung in the White House by Presidents John F. Kennedy and Lyndon Johnson.

== Bibliography ==
(with Lynne Deur)

- Political Cartoonists, Lerner Publications, 1972
- Run For The Oval Room, Alpha Press, 1975
- The Sanders Book, Milwaukee Journal, 1977

(with Albert Robbins and Randall Rothenberg)

- Getting Angry Six Days a Week, Beacon Press, 1979

(illustrations and cartoons)

- Felicia Lamport, Political Plumlines, Doubleday, 1984
- Adventures in Whopperland, Lulu Publishing, 2006
- Whopperland II, The Last Chapter, Lulu Publishing, 2008
- "Against the Grain: Bombthrowing in the Fine American Tradition of Political Cartooning", NewSouth Books, 2018 ISBN 978-1588382948 OCLC 1054393137
