= South Haven Christian School =

Location
- 116 Academy Drive; Springfield, Tennessee; United States
- Coordinates: 36.4732°N 86.8561°W

Information
- Type: Private K–12
- Established: 1986
- Principal: Dr. Steve Blaser
- Grades: K-12
- Enrollment: 300
- Mascot: Patriots
- Website: https://www.shcspatriots.org/

South Haven Christian School is a private, K–12 Christian school located in Springfield, Tennessee. It is a ministry of South Haven Baptist Church and is of Independent Baptist affiliation. South Haven enrolls approximately 300 students.

The school is accredited by the Tennessee Association of Christian Schools (TACS) and approved by the Tennessee Department of Education.

== Athletics ==
South Haven Christian School's Patriots boys athletic teams compete in the Middle Tennessee Christian Athletic Association. The Varsity football team were the MTAC champions of 2017. They faced their rivals CCS with an ending score of 61–58. the Varsity girls basketball team won 2nd place in the state tournament of 2019 The Varsity boys won the soccer state tournament in 2019 with an ending score of 3–2.
