= Springfield Robertson County Airport =

Airport in Tennessee, United States

- IATA: none; ICAO: none; FAA LID: M91

Summary
- Airport type: Public
- Owner: Springfield/Robertson Airport Board
- Serves: Springfield, Tennessee
- Elevation AMSL: 706 ft (215 m)
- Coordinates: 36°32′12″N 086°55′16″W

Map
- Location of airport in Tennessee M91 (the United States)

Runways
Direction	Length		Surface
Direction	ft	m	Surface
4/22	5,505	1,678	Asphalt

Statistics (2019)
- Aircraft operations (year ending 6/30/2019): 14,300
- Based aircraft: 65
- Source: Federal Aviation Administration

Springfield Robertson County Airport (FAA LID: M91) is a public use airport located three nautical miles (6 km) northwest of the central business district of Springfield, a city in Robertson County, Tennessee, United States. It is owned by the Springfield/Robertson Airport Board. This airport is included in the National Plan of Integrated Airport Systems for 2011–2015, which categorized it as a general aviation facility.

== Facilities and aircraft ==
Springfield Robertson County Airport covers an area of 148 acres (60 ha) at an elevation of 706 feet (215 m) above mean sea level. It has one runway designated 4/22 with an asphalt surface measuring 5,505 by 100 feet (1,678 x 30 m).

For the 12-month period ending June 30, 2019, the airport had 14,300 aircraft operations, an average of 39 per day: 84% general aviation, 13% military, and 3% air taxi. At that time there were 65 aircraft based at this airport: 56 single-engine, 2 multi-engine, and 7 helicopter.

== See also ==
- List of airports in Tennessee
