= Robertson County Courthouse (Tennessee) =

- U.S. National Register of Historic Places
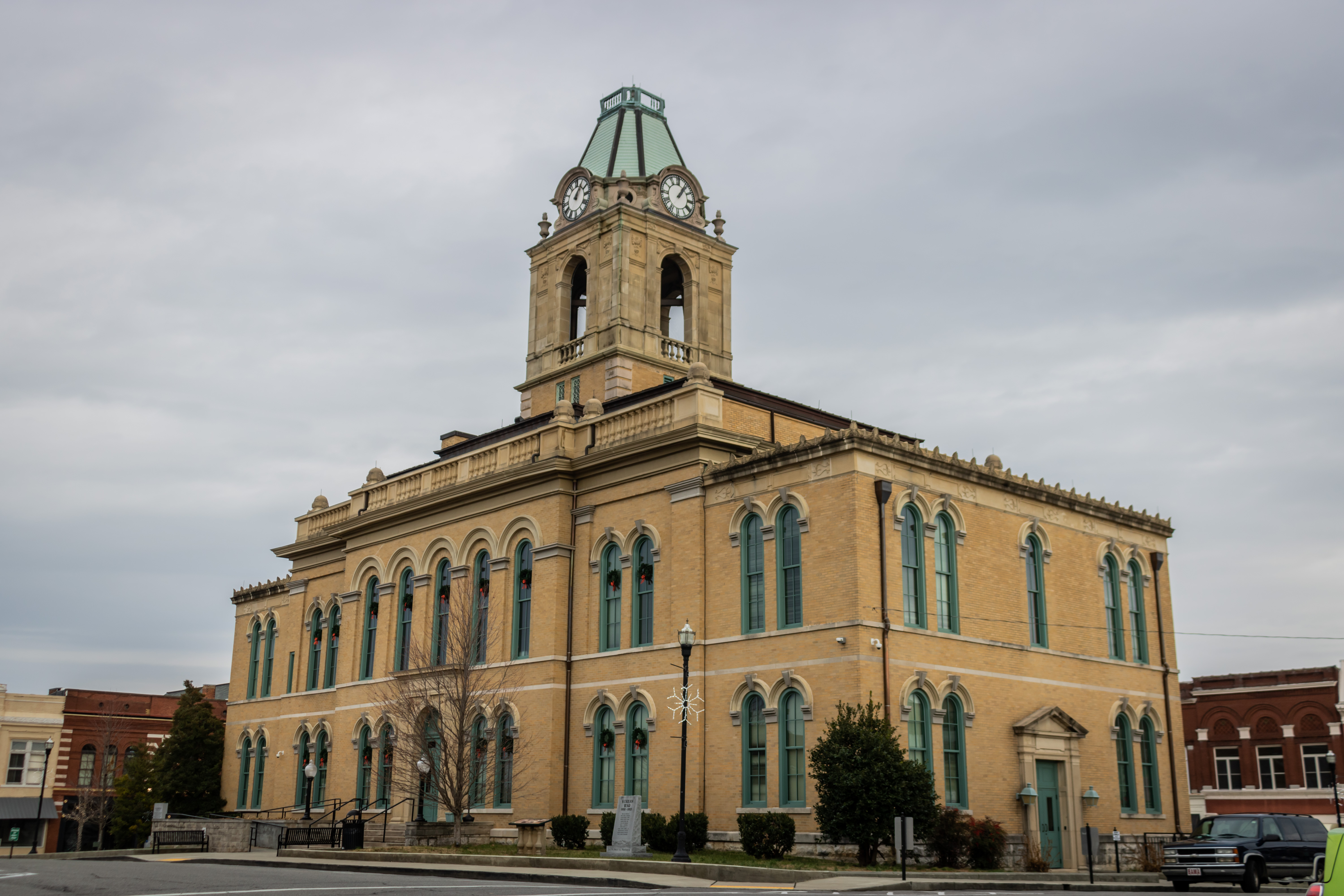
- The courthouse in 2019

- Location within Tennessee Location within the United States
- Interactive map showing the location of Robertson County Courthouse
- Location: Public Sq., Springfield, Tennessee
- Coordinates: 36°30′08″N 86°53′08″W
- Built: 1879
- Built by: Patton & McInturff
- Architect: W.C. Smith
- Architectural style: Victorian
- NRHP reference No.: 78002627
- Added to NRHP: May 22, 1978

Robertson County Courthouse in Springfield, Tennessee dates from 1879. The building's north wing, south wing, and central clock tower were added in 1929–30. The architect was W.C. Smith and the building contractor was the firm of Patton & McInturff. The architects for the expansion were Edward E. Dougherty and Thomas W. Gardner of Nashville.

The building was listed on the National Register of Historic Places in 1978.
