= Springfield, Tennessee =

- City
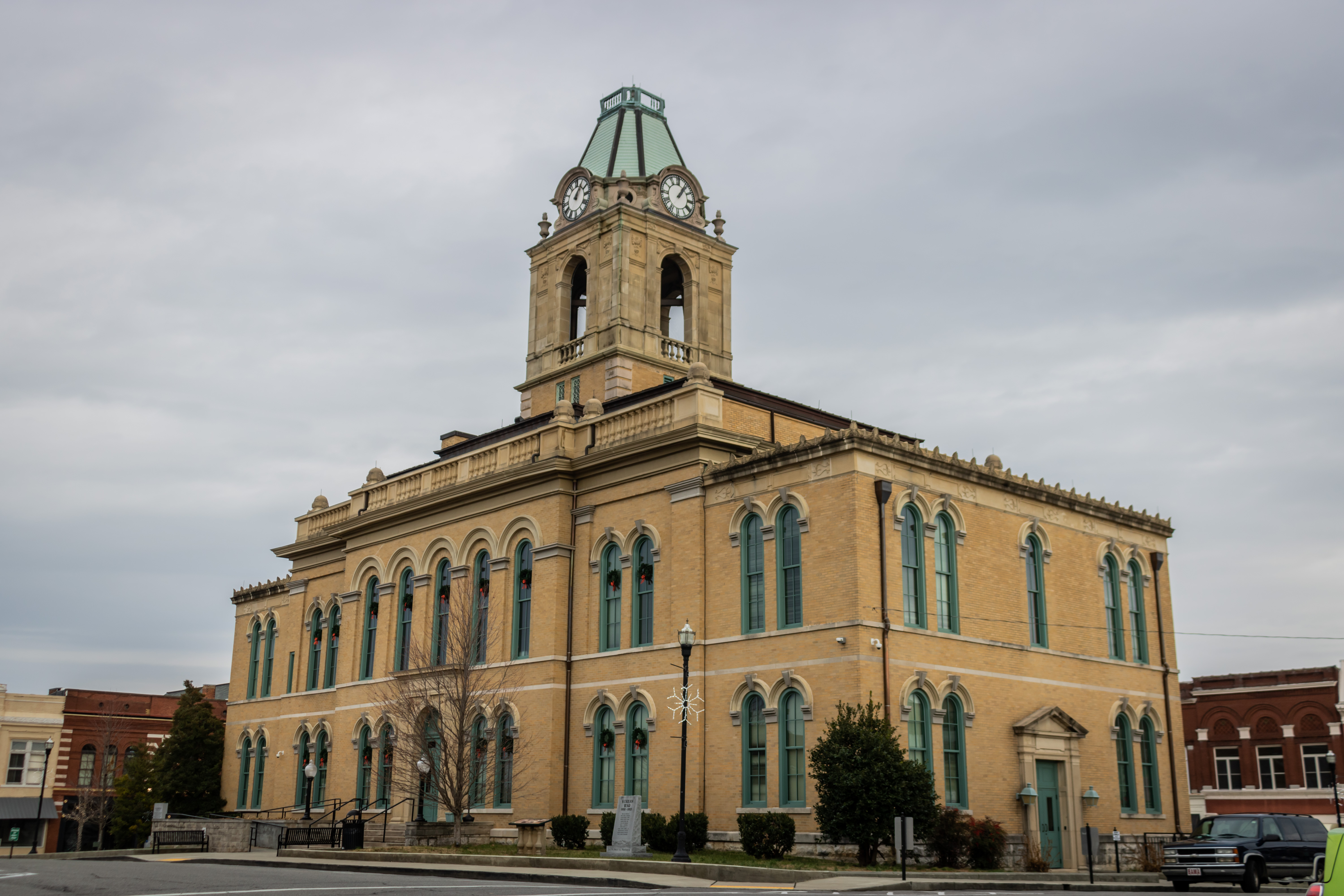
- Robertson County Courthouse in 2019

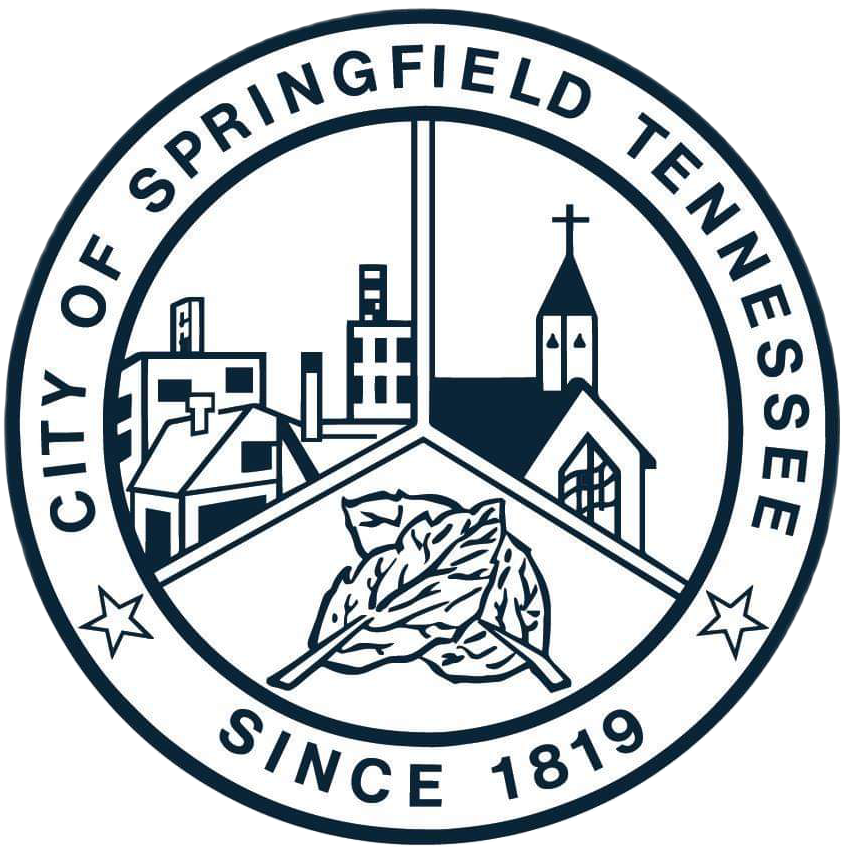
- Seal
- Motto: "World's Finest Dark-Fired Tobacco"
- Location of Springfield in Robertson County, Tennessee.
- Coordinates: 36°29′58″N 86°52′43″W
- Country: United States
- State: Tennessee
- County: Robertson
- Incorporated: 1819

Government
  - Type: Council/Manager
  - Mayor: Buzzy Poole
  - City Manager: Ryan Martin

Area
  - Total: 13.32 sq mi (34.51 km^{2})
  - Land: 13.32 sq mi (34.49 km^{2})
  - Water: 0.012 sq mi (0.03 km^{2})
- Elevation: 666 ft (203 m)

Population (2020)
  - Total: 18,782 ▲
  - Estimate (2024): 19,842 ▲
  - Density: 1,410.5/sq mi (544.59/km^{2})
- Time zone: UTC-6 (CST)
  - Summer (DST): UTC-5 (CDT)
- ZIP code: 37172
- Area codes: 615, 629
- FIPS code: 47-70500
- GNIS feature ID: 1271139
- Website: springfieldtn.gov

Springfield is the county seat of Robertson County, Tennessee, United States. It is located in Middle Tennessee near the northern border of the state. As of the 2020 census, the city's population was 18,782.

== History ==
US 431 and US 41 have had different routes through Springfield. US 41 formerly had a more eastern route, now called Old Greenbrier Road. A portion of the old route was abandoned in the 1990s due to landscaping made during the construction of a railroad. The practical usage of the road was replaced by the 17th Avenue Connector. The old pavement is still visible from Bill Jones Industrial Drive. Beyond that, it ran more westerly through downtown Springfield, now called Batts Boulevard and Main Street. A portion of the old route north of downtown was removed due to the construction of a quarry. US 41 was rerouted onto Memorial Boulevard, a 4 lane highway, around 1961 after its completion.

US 431 followed a more eastern route prior to at least 2010 south of Springfield. This route had a different bridge crossing at Carr Creek that has since been demolished. North of the bridge, it followed what is now called Main Street. It intersected US 41 at the junction of what is now Main Street, A C Street, and 11th Avenue. It ran with US 41 after this intersection, until its own rerouting on Memorial Boulevard in 1961. US 431 was rerouted onto Tom Austin Highway around 1983.

== Geography ==
Interactive map of Springfield

According to the United States Census Bureau, the city has a total area of 13.14 square miles (34.0 km^{2}), of which 13.13 square miles (34.0 km^{2}) is land and 0.01 square miles (0.026 km^{2}) (0.08%) is water. Springfield is located at 36°29′58″N 86°52′43″W (36.499508, -86.878717).

According to the United States Census Bureau, the city has a total area of 12.2 square miles (32 km^{2}), all land.

=== Climate ===
Climate data for Springfield Experiment Station, Tennessee (1991–2020 normals, extremes 1942–present)
| Month | Jan | Feb | Mar | Apr | May | Jun | Jul | Aug | Sep | Oct | Nov | Dec | Year |
|---|---|---|---|---|---|---|---|---|---|---|---|---|---|
| Record high °F (°C) | 77 (25) | 82 (28) | 87 (31) | 89 (32) | 96 (36) | 106 (41) | 106 (41) | 106 (41) | 104 (40) | 97 (36) | 87 (31) | 77 (25) | 106 (41) |
| Mean daily maximum °F (°C) | 45.3 (7.4) | 49.7 (9.8) | 58.9 (14.9) | 69.0 (20.6) | 77.2 (25.1) | 85.1 (29.5) | 88.5 (31.4) | 88.1 (31.2) | 82.3 (27.9) | 71.2 (21.8) | 58.7 (14.8) | 48.7 (9.3) | 68.6 (20.3) |
| Daily mean °F (°C) | 36.2 (2.3) | 39.7 (4.3) | 48.1 (8.9) | 57.8 (14.3) | 66.8 (19.3) | 74.8 (23.8) | 78.4 (25.8) | 77.2 (25.1) | 70.9 (21.6) | 59.4 (15.2) | 48.2 (9.0) | 39.7 (4.3) | 58.1 (14.5) |
| Mean daily minimum °F (°C) | 27.0 (−2.8) | 29.7 (−1.3) | 37.3 (2.9) | 46.6 (8.1) | 56.5 (13.6) | 64.6 (18.1) | 68.3 (20.2) | 66.3 (19.1) | 59.5 (15.3) | 47.5 (8.6) | 37.7 (3.2) | 30.7 (−0.7) | 47.6 (8.7) |
| Record low °F (°C) | −18 (−28) | −13 (−25) | 1 (−17) | 16 (−9) | 30 (−1) | 40 (4) | 47 (8) | 42 (6) | 31 (−1) | 22 (−6) | −5 (−21) | −16 (−27) | −18 (−28) |
| Average precipitation inches (mm) | 4.25 (108) | 4.47 (114) | 4.82 (122) | 5.34 (136) | 5.64 (143) | 4.26 (108) | 4.36 (111) | 3.72 (94) | 3.76 (96) | 4.17 (106) | 3.77 (96) | 4.73 (120) | 53.29 (1,354) |
| Average snowfall inches (cm) | 1.5 (3.8) | 2.4 (6.1) | 1.2 (3.0) | 0.0 (0.0) | 0.0 (0.0) | 0.0 (0.0) | 0.0 (0.0) | 0.0 (0.0) | 0.0 (0.0) | 0.0 (0.0) | 0.0 (0.0) | 0.7 (1.8) | 5.8 (15) |
| Average precipitation days (≥ 0.01 in) | 11.1 | 10.7 | 12.0 | 11.7 | 11.9 | 10.0 | 9.5 | 8.1 | 8.1 | 8.6 | 9.5 | 11.5 | 122.7 |
| Average snowy days (≥ 0.1 in) | 1.2 | 1.8 | 0.7 | 0.0 | 0.0 | 0.0 | 0.0 | 0.0 | 0.0 | 0.0 | 0.0 | 0.7 | 4.4 |
Source: NOAA

== Demographics ==
Historical population
| Census | Pop. | Note | %± |
|---|---|---|---|
| 1890 | 1,372 | | — |
| 1900 | 1,732 | | 26.2% |
| 1910 | 2,085 | | 20.4% |
| 1920 | 3,860 | | 85.1% |
| 1930 | 5,577 | | 44.5% |
| 1940 | 6,668 | | 19.6% |
| 1950 | 6,506 | | −2.4% |
| 1960 | 9,221 | | 41.7% |
| 1970 | 9,720 | | 5.4% |
| 1980 | 10,814 | | 11.3% |
| 1990 | 11,227 | | 3.8% |
| 2000 | 14,329 | | 27.6% |
| 2010 | 16,440 | | 14.7% |
| 2020 | 18,782 | | 14.2% |
| 2025 (est.) | 20,090 | ▲ | 7.0% |

=== 2020 census ===
As of the 2020 census, Springfield had a population of 18,782 and a median age of 35.6 years; 25.9% of residents were under the age of 18 and 14.4% of residents were 65 years of age or older. For every 100 females there were 94.8 males, and for every 100 females age 18 and over there were 91.2 males age 18 and over.

97.1% of residents lived in urban areas, while 2.9% lived in rural areas.

There were 6,921 households in Springfield, of which 35.4% had children under the age of 18 living in them. Of all households, 39.3% were married-couple households, 17.7% were households with a male householder and no spouse or partner present, and 35.1% were households with a female householder and no spouse or partner present. About 27.4% of all households were made up of individuals and 11.6% had someone living alone who was 65 years of age or older.

There were 7,351 housing units, of which 5.8% were vacant. The homeowner vacancy rate was 1.3% and the rental vacancy rate was 5.8%.

Racial composition as of the 2020 census
| Race | Number | Percent |
|---|---|---|
| White | 10,439 | 55.6% |
| Black or African American | 3,828 | 20.4% |
| American Indian and Alaska Native | 185 | 1.0% |
| Asian | 115 | 0.6% |
| Native Hawaiian and Other Pacific Islander | 6 | 0.0% |
| Some other race | 2,552 | 13.6% |
| Two or more races | 1,657 | 8.8% |
| Hispanic or Latino (of any race) | 4,388 | 23.4% |

=== 2010 census ===
At the 2010 census there were 16,957 people in 6,212 households, including 3,778 families, in the city. The population density was 1,173.9 inhabitants per square mile (453.2/km^{2}). There were 5,836 housing units at an average density of 478.1 per square mile (184.6/km^{2}). The racial makeup of the city was 70.2% White, 21.4% African American, 0.1% Native American, 0.56% Asian, 0.03% Pacific Islander, 1.76% from other races, and 0.81% from two or more races. Hispanic or Latino of any race were 17.5%.

Of the 5,453 households 31.8% had children under the age of 18 living with them, 45.7% were married couples living together, 18.4% had a female householder with no husband present, and 30.7% were non-families. 25.8% of households were one person and 11.7% were one person aged 65 or older. The average household size was 2.55 and the average family size was 3.00.

The age distribution was 24.8% under the age of 18, 11.2% from 18 to 24, 29.1% from 25 to 44, 20.4% from 45 to 64, and 14.6% 65 or older. The median age was 35 years. For every 100 females, there were 92.9 males. For every 100 females age 18 and over, there were 89.1 males.

The median household income was $46,757 and the median family income was $42,018. Males had a median income of $32,270 versus $22,765 for females. The per capita income for the city was $22,611. About 13.7% of families and 19.0% of the population were below the poverty line, including 22.7% of those under age 18 and 17.7% of those age 65 or over.

== Recreation ==
The City of Springfield Parks and Recreation operates:

- American Legion Park
- Garner Street Park
- J. Travis Price Park
- Martin Luther King Jr. Park
- Springfield Greenway

== Government and politics ==
Springfield, Tennessee, operates under a council–manager form of government, a system it adopted in 1990. In this structure, the City Manager is appointed by and reports to the elected legislative body and is responsible for overseeing the daily operations of the city’s departments and services.

The city’s legislative authority is vested in a seven‑member Board of Mayor and Aldermen (often abbreviated BOMA), which serves as the principal policy‑making body. The board consists of a Mayor elected at‑large and six aldermen, each representing one of the city’s six wards, all serving four‑year terms. The Board enacts ordinances, resolutions, and major plans, and holds regular meetings, typically on the third Tuesday of each month.

Under the charter, the Mayor presides over Board meetings and serves as the ceremonial head of the city but does not have veto power. Eligibility for elected office requires that the Mayor and aldermen be qualified voters who have resided in the city or their ward for at least one year prior to the election.

The City of Springfield is a full‑service municipality, providing utilities such as electric, natural gas, water, wastewater, and sanitation services directly to residents, and also oversees other departments, including Public Works and Human Resources.

=== Mayoral elections ===
On November 8, 2016, Vice Mayor Ann Schneider defeated Buzzy Poole in the mayoral election by 38 votes. She was sworn in one month later as Springfield's first female mayor, succeeding Billy Paul Carneal. Schneider was re-elected in 2020.

On November 5, 2024, Schneider was defeated in her bid for re-election by Buzzy Poole, losing by 303 votes.

=== Political makeup ===
Springfield votes Republican in statewide elections, but is the least strongly Republican area in Robertson County.

Springfield Presidential election results
| Year | Republican | Democratic | Third parties |
|---|---|---|---|
| 2024 | 59.92% 3,783 | 39.11% 2,469 | 0.97% 61 |
| 2020 | 56.52% 3,746 | 41.90% 2,777 | 1.58% 105 |
| 2016 | 55.39% 3,090 | 40.67% 2,269 | 3.94% 220 |

== Education ==
The city is served by

- Springfield High School
- Innovation Academy
- Krisle Elementary School
- Cheatham Park Elementary School
- Westside Elementary School
- Bransford Elementary School
- Crestview Elementary School
- South Haven Christian School

The Highland Crest higher education facility is home to Volunteer State Community College and Austin Peay State University.

== Sports ==
In 1923, Springfield hosted a Minor League Baseball team of Kentucky–Illinois–Tennessee League called the Springfield Blanket Makers.

== Infrastructure ==
=== Transportation ===
Highways

- / U.S. Route 431 / Tennessee State Route 65 (Note: Unsigned) (Tom Austin Highway)
- / U.S. Route 41 / Tennessee State Route 11 (Note: Unsigned) (Memorial Blvd)
- Tennessee State Route 76
- Tennessee State Route 49
- Tennessee State Route 25 (Lakeview Rd)
- Tennessee State Route 161

US 41 and US 431 are the major north-south highways running through Springfield, and both run southward to Nashville. US 41 runs north from Springfield to Cedar Hill, Adams and the Kentucky state line at Guthrie. US 431 runs north to Russellville, Kentucky. The major east-west highways are State Route 76 (SR 76) and State Route 49 (SR 49). State Route 76 is mainly unsigned throughout the entire town and runs concurrently with SR 49 and US 41. It runs east from Springfield to White House and Interstate 65. State Route 49 (SR 49) runs through Springfield and intersects US 41. It runs west to Coopertown and Interstate 24. It runs east to Orlinda and Interstate 65 via State Route 52. Other minor state routes in the Springfield area are State Route 25 (SR 25) and State Route 161 (SR 161).

=== Airport ===
Springfield Robertson County Airport is a local airport north of Springfield adjacent to US 41. There are no commercial flights to or from the airport.

=== Medical ===
- TriStar NorthCrest Medical Center

== Notable people ==
- David Alexander, president of Pomona College and administrator of the Rhodes Scholar program, was born in Springfield
- Edward Butler, Army officer in the American Revolution and former acting Inspector General of the United States Army, died in Springfield
- Richard Cheatham, Whig Congressman from Tennessee, was a Springfield native and resident. His children included:
  - Boyd M. Cheatham, member of Tennessee's legislature, Springfield native and resident
  - Edward Saunders Cheatham, member of Tennessee's legislature, Springfield native and resident
  - Richard Boone Cheatham, member of Tennessee's legislature, born in Springfield, was later Mayor of Nashville
- Jeff Fosnes, record-setting Vanderbilt University basketball star, medical doctor
- Daniel E. Garrett, born near Springfield, lawyer and politician
- Albert Hadley, interior designer and decorator, was born in Springfield
- Charles Hartmann, New Orleans jazz trombonist and union activist, died in Springfield
- Paul Henderson, African-American photojournalist, was born in Springfield
- Alice Vassar LaCour, African-American teacher and singer, was principal of an American Missionary Association school in Springfield for former slaves
- Bill Monroe, musician called the "Father of Bluegrass", died in Springfield
- Romeo Nelson, boogie woogie pianist, was born in Springfield
- Jasen Rauch, Christian rock guitarist and songwriter, lives in Springfield
- Bill Sanders, award-winning editorial cartoonist, was born in Springfield
- Tracy Smothers, professional wrestler, was born in Springfield
- Harry Underwood, self-taught "outsider artist", has his home and studio in Springfield
