= Robertson County Courthouse (Kentucky) =

- U.S. National Register of Historic Places
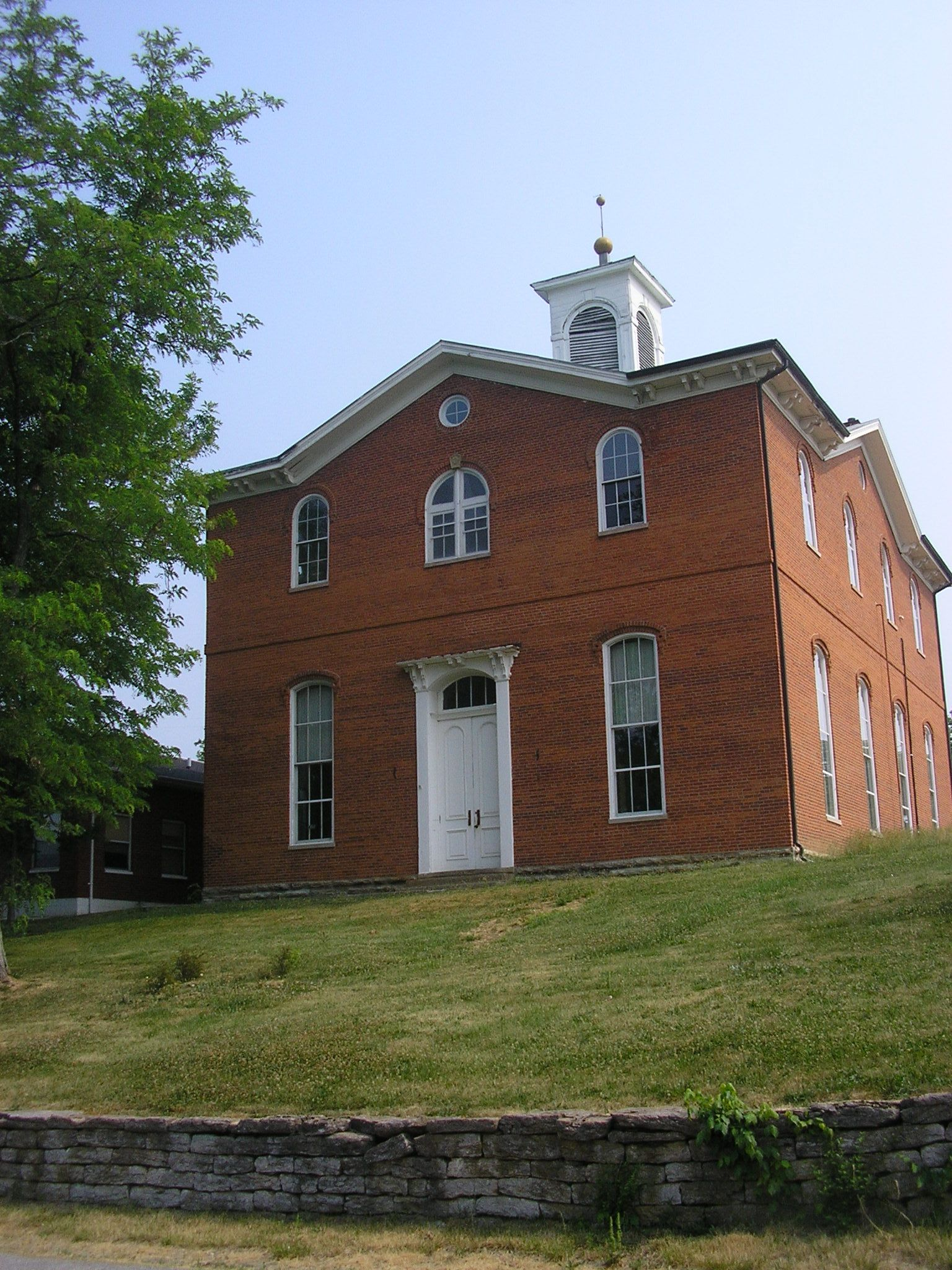

- Location within Kentucky Location within the United States
- Location: Court St., Mount Olivet, Kentucky
- Coordinates: 38°31′54″N 84°02′09″W
- Area: 0.5 acres (0.20 ha)
- Built: 1870
- Built by: Williams, G.M.
- Architectural style: Italianate
- NRHP reference No.: 78001394
- Added to NRHP: February 14, 1978

The Robertson County Courthouse in Mount Olivet, Kentucky was built in 1870. It was listed on the National Register of Historic Places in 1978.

It is a two-story "chaste yet straightforward Italianate building" designed and built by local builder G.M. Williams.
