= Richard Boone Cheatham =

American politician (1824–1877)

- Born: December 8, 1824; Robertson County, Tennessee, U.S.
- Died: May 7, 1877 (aged 52); Nashville, Tennessee, U.S.
- Resting place: Mount Olivet Cemetery; Nashville, Tennessee, U.S.
- Education: University of Nashville
- Occupation: Politician
- Spouse: Frances Ann Bugg
- Children: Katherine "Kitty" Cheatham
- Parent: Richard Cheatham
- Relatives: Edward Saunders Cheatham (brother); Boyd M. Cheatham (brother)

Richard Boone Cheatham (December 8, 1824 – May 7, 1877) was an American politician based in Nashville, Tennessee. He was serving as the mayor of Nashville, Tennessee, during the opening years of the Civil War. After the war he served as alderman of the city, and later as a representative to the State House, 1869-1871.

== Early life ==
Cheatham was born in Robertson County, Tennessee, in 1824. He had two brothers, Edward Saunders Cheatham and Boyd M. Cheatham. Their father Richard Cheatham was a Whig politician and was elected in 1836 to the U.S. House of Representatives. Richard's two brothers, Edward Saunders Cheatham (1818-1878) and Boyd M. Cheatham, both served in the Tennessee state legislature.

Cheatham graduated from the University of Nashville.

== Politics ==
Cheatham entered politics after college, serving as the clerk of the Tennessee House of Representatives.

At the age of 34, he was elected as an alderman in 1858, and as the Mayor of Nashville in 1860. He was removed from power by military governor Andrew Johnson when Union forces occupied the city beginning in 1862.

After the American Civil War, Cheatham was elected as an alderman of Nashville in 1865, and as the president of the board of aldermen in 1866.

Cheatham was elected during the Reconstruction era as a member of the Tennessee House of Representatives, serving from 1869 to 1871. His district included Davidson County as well as Robertson, Cheatham and Montgomery counties. He also served on the county court.

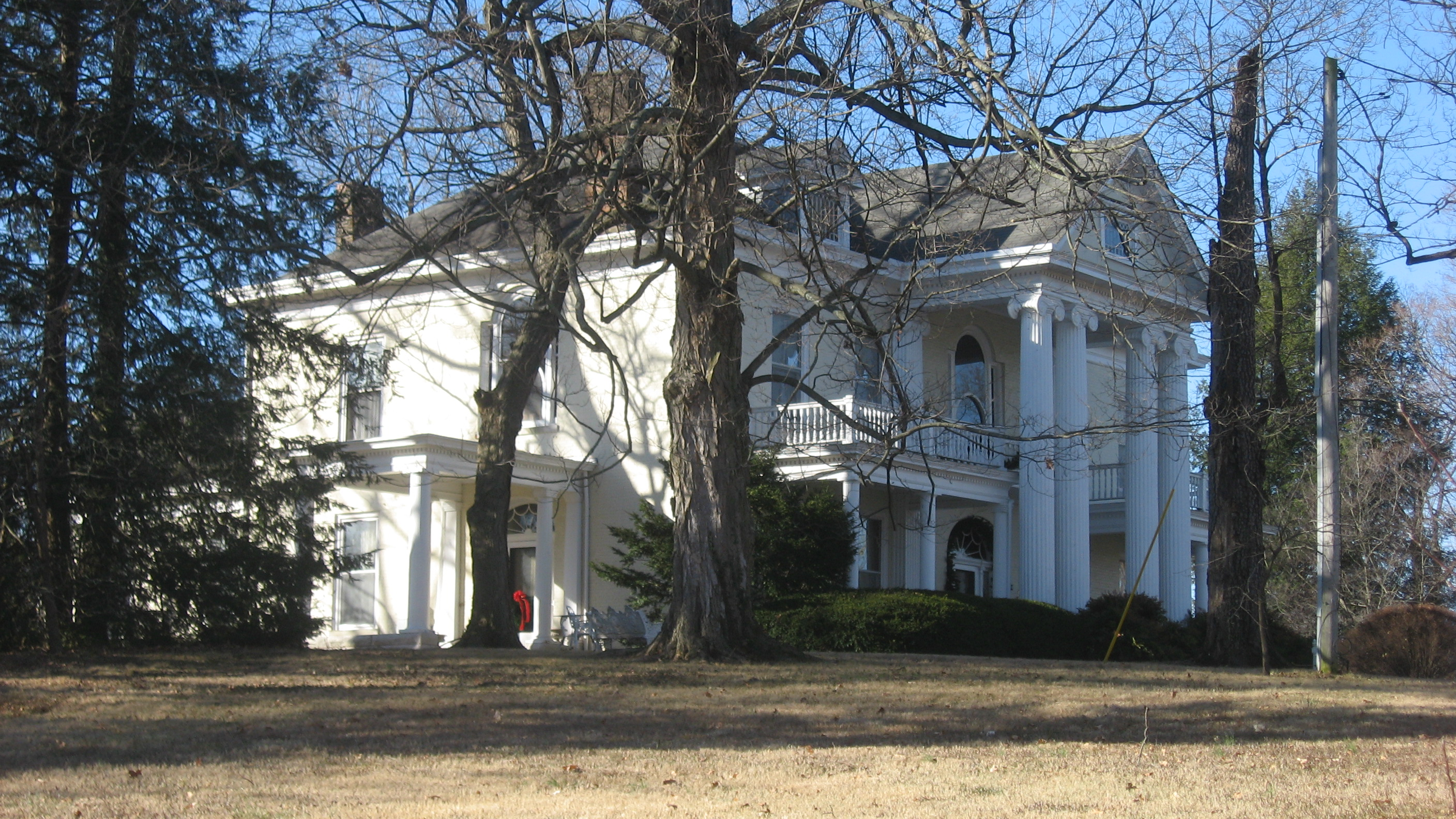
The Mansfield Cheatham House in Springfield, Tennessee.

== Personal life and death ==
Cheatham married Frances Ann Bugg. They lived at his family residence, the Mansfield Cheatham House in Springfield, Tennessee.

Cheatham died on May 7, 1877, in Nashville, Tennessee. His funeral was held at the First Presbyterian Church. He was buried at Mount Olivet Cemetery in Nashville.

One of his daughters, Katherine "Kitty" Cheatham (born in 1864), became a famous singer of children's songs and "plantation melodies" she remembered her African American "Mammy" singing during her childhood. His cousin was Major General Benjamin Franklin Cheatham.

Political offices
Preceded by Samuel N. Hollingsworth	Mayor of Nashville, Tennessee; 1860-1862	Succeeded by John Hugh Smith
