= Boyd M. Cheatham =

American politician (c. 1838–1876)

- Born: c. 1838; Robertson County, Tennessee, U.S.
- Died: July 19, 1876; Springfield, Tennessee, U.S.
- Occupation: Politician
- Relatives: Richard Boone Cheatham (brother); Edward Saunders Cheatham (brother); Adelicia Acklen (sister-in-law); Anderson Cheatham (paternal uncle)

Boyd M. Cheatham (c. 1838 – July 19, 1876) was an American politician from Springfield, Tennessee. He came from a very political family, following his father and uncle into electoral office. He served in the Tennessee State House.

== Early life ==
Boyd M. Cheatham was born circa 1838. His father was one of seven early settlers from Virginia who moved to Robertson County, Tennessee. His uncle, Anderson Cheatham, served in the Tennessee House of Representatives from 1801 to 1809, then from 1819 to 1821 and again from 1823 to 1825.

He attended the University of Nashville where he was a member of the Epsilon (original) chapter of the Sigma Chi Fraternity. Two of his brothers entered politics. Edward Saunders Cheatham (1818-1878) served in the Tennessee House of Representatives from 1853 to 1855, and then served as a member of the Tennessee Senate from 1855 to 1857, and again from 1861 to 1863. Their brother, Richard Boone Cheatham (1824-1877), moved to Nashville after college. There he was elected and served as the mayor of Nashville, Tennessee from 1860 to 1862, and later in the Tennessee State House.

Another brother, Dr. William Archer Cheatham (1820-1900), married the twice widowed Adelicia Acklen (1817–1887), becoming her third husband. She owned the Belmont Mansion in Nashville.

== Career ==
Cheatham served in the Tennessee House of Representatives in the nineteenth century.

== Death ==
Cheatham died at his residence in Springfield, Tennessee on July 19, 1876, in the waning days of the Reconstruction era. He was only thirty-eight years old.
