= Edward Saunders Cheatham =

American politician and businessman (1818–1878)

- Born: July 31, 1818; Robertson County, Tennessee, U.S.
- Died: December 21, 1878 (aged 60); DeSoto County, Mississippi, U.S.
- Resting place: Mount Olivet Cemetery
- Occupations: Politician, businessman
- Political party: Whig Party
- Spouse: 3
- Children: 2 son, 4 daughter
- Parent(s): Richard Cheatham; Susan Saunders
- Relatives: Richard Boone Cheatham (brother); Boyd M. Cheatham (brother); Adelicia Acklen (sister-in-law); Ephraim H. Foster (father-in-law); Mark R. Cockrill (father-in-law)

Edward Saunders Cheatham (July 31, 1818 – December 21, 1878) was an American politician and businessman.

== Early life ==
Edward Saunders Cheatham was born on July 31, 1818, in Robertson County, Tennessee. His father, Richard Cheatham, served as United States Representative from Tennessee from 1837 to 1839, after eight years of previous service as a state legislator. His mother was Susan Saunders. They had the Mansfield Cheatham House built in Springfield, Tennessee, where they lived for many years with their family.

Two of Edward's three brothers also went into politics. His brother, Dr. William Archer Cheatham, became the third husband of Adelicia Acklen (1817–1887), who owned the Belmont Mansion in Nashville. His brother, Richard Boone Cheatham, served as alderman and as Mayor of Nashville from 1860 to 1862. His third brother, Boyd M. Cheatham, also served in the Tennessee House of Representatives.

== Career ==
Cheatham owned a grocery in Nashville and a sawmill in Greenbrier. He served as the president of the Edgefield and Kentucky Railroad as well as of the Louisville and Nashville Railroad in the antebellum era.

Cheatham joined the Whig Party. He served as a member of the Tennessee House of Representatives from 1853 to 1855. He then served as a member of the Tennessee Senate from 1855 to 1857, and again from 1861 to 1863. He also served as Speaker of the Tennessee Senate.

Cheatham supported the Confederate States of America.

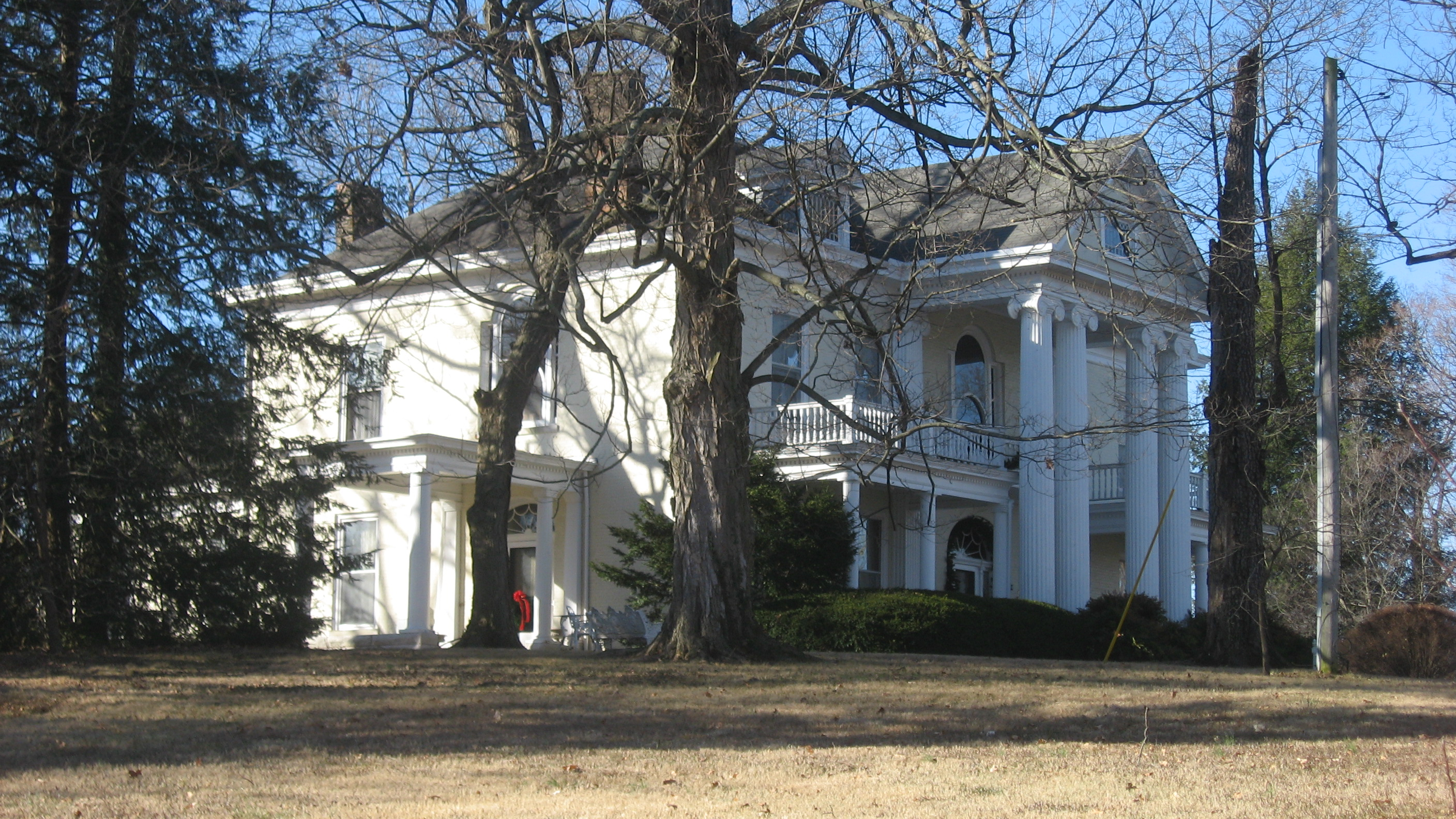
The Mansfield Cheatham House in Springfield, Tennessee.

== Personal life, death and legacy ==
Cheatham was married three times. He first married Ellen Foster, the daughter of US Senator Ephraim H. Foster. They had a son, Robert, and two daughters.

After her death, he married Julia Cockrill, the daughter of Mark R. Cockrill, a planter known as the "Wool King of the World". She also died young.

Cheatham married Lottie Wall; they had a son and two daughters together.

Cheatham resided at the family home, the Mansfield Cheatham House, which his father had built for his own family earlier in his life in Springfield, Tennessee.

Cheatham died on December 21, 1878, in DeSoto County, Mississippi, near Horn Lake. He was buried in the Mount Olivet Cemetery in Nashville. Cheatham County, Tennessee, was named in his honor.
