= Richard Cheatham =

American politician

Member of the U.S. House of Representatives from Tennessee's 11th district
- In office March 4, 1837 – March 3, 1839
- Preceded by: Cave Johnson
- Succeeded by: Cave Johnson

Member of the Tennessee House of Representatives
- In office 1825–1833

Personal details
- Born: February 20, 1799 Springfield, Tennessee, U.S.
- Died: September 9, 1845 (aged 46) White's Creek Springs, Tennessee, U.S.
- Party: Whig
- Spouse: Susan Saunders Cheatham
- Children: Edward Saunders Cheatham; William Archer Cheatham; Boyd M. Cheatham; Richard Boone Cheatham
- Profession: Merchant, stockman, gin operator, politician

Richard Cheatham (February 20, 1799 – September 9, 1845) was an American politician in Middle Tennessee. He was elected as a Whig in 1836 from Tennessee's 11th congressional district to the United States House of Representatives, serving one term. He had previously served several terms in Tennessee's State House, from 1825 to 1833.

== Biography ==
Cheatham was born in Springfield, Tennessee, on February 20, 1799. After completing preparatory studies, he went to work. He engaged in mercantile pursuits, stock raising, and operating a cotton gin. He married Susan Saunders.

== Career ==
Cheatham soon became politically active and was first elected to the Tennessee House of Representatives in 1824, at the age of 25. He served several terms, from 1825 to 1833. He was a member of the State constitutional convention which met at Nashville from May 19 to August 30, 1834. He was Presidential Elector for Tennessee in 1836. He served in the State militia with the rank of general.

Cheatham ran for Congress three successive times before being elected in 1836 as a Whig to the Twenty-fifth Congress, which lasted from March 4, 1837 to March 3, 1839. He failed to be re-elected to the Twenty-sixth or Twenty-seventh Congresses. He resumed his former business pursuits.

== Death ==
While visiting at White's Creek Springs near Springfield, Tennessee, Cheatham died on September 9, 1845 (age 46 years, 201 days). He was interred at Old City Cemetery. His widow and eldest son, Edward, continued his businesses. His remains were reinterred at Elmwood Cemetery in 1952. Cheatham County was named after his son, Edward Saunders Cheatham.

U.S. House of Representatives
Preceded by Cave Johnson	Member of the U.S. House of Representatives from Tennessee's 11th congressional district 1837–1839	Succeeded by Cave Johnson
