= Bledsoe Creek State Park =

State-protected area of Tennessee, United States

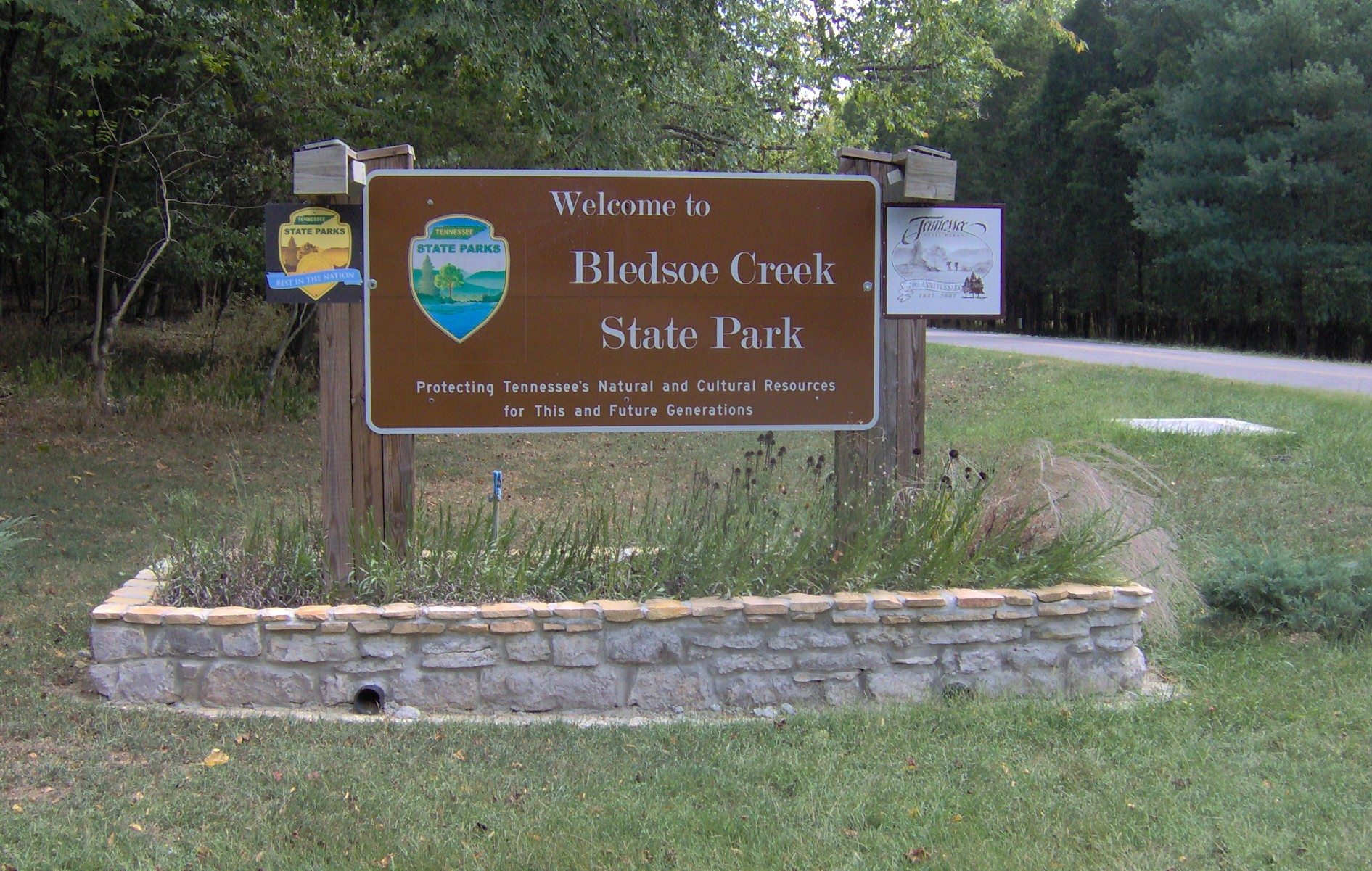
- Interactive map of Bledsoe Creek State Park
- Type: Tennessee State Park
- Location: Gallatin, Tennessee, United States
- Coordinates: 36.37914°N 86.35683°W
- Area: 164 acres (0.66 km^{2})
- Operator: Tennessee Department of Environment and Conservation
- Website: Bledsoe Creek

Bledsoe Creek State Park is a state park in Sumner County, Tennessee, in the southeastern United States. The park consists of 169 acres (0.68 km^{2}) managed by the Tennessee Department of Environment and Conservation. The park spans much of the west shore of the Bledsoe Creek embayment of Old Hickory Lake, an impoundment of the Cumberland River created with the completion of Old Hickory Dam by the U.S. Army Corps of Engineers in 1954.

Bledsoe Creek State Park was developed as a recreational area by the Corps as part of its Old Hickory Dam project, and was designated a state park by the state of Tennessee in 1973. The park is primarily a campground and recreational boating and fishing area, although the park has developed several miles of hiking trails and provides environmental programs throughout the year. The park is located within a 5-mile (8.0 km) radius of the Wynnewood and Cragfont state historic sites, Bledsoe's Fort Historic Park, a Mississippian-period mound complex, and the Cairo Rosenwald School, all of which attest to the area's pre-historic and historic importance to the Upper Cumberland region.

== Geographical and natural setting ==
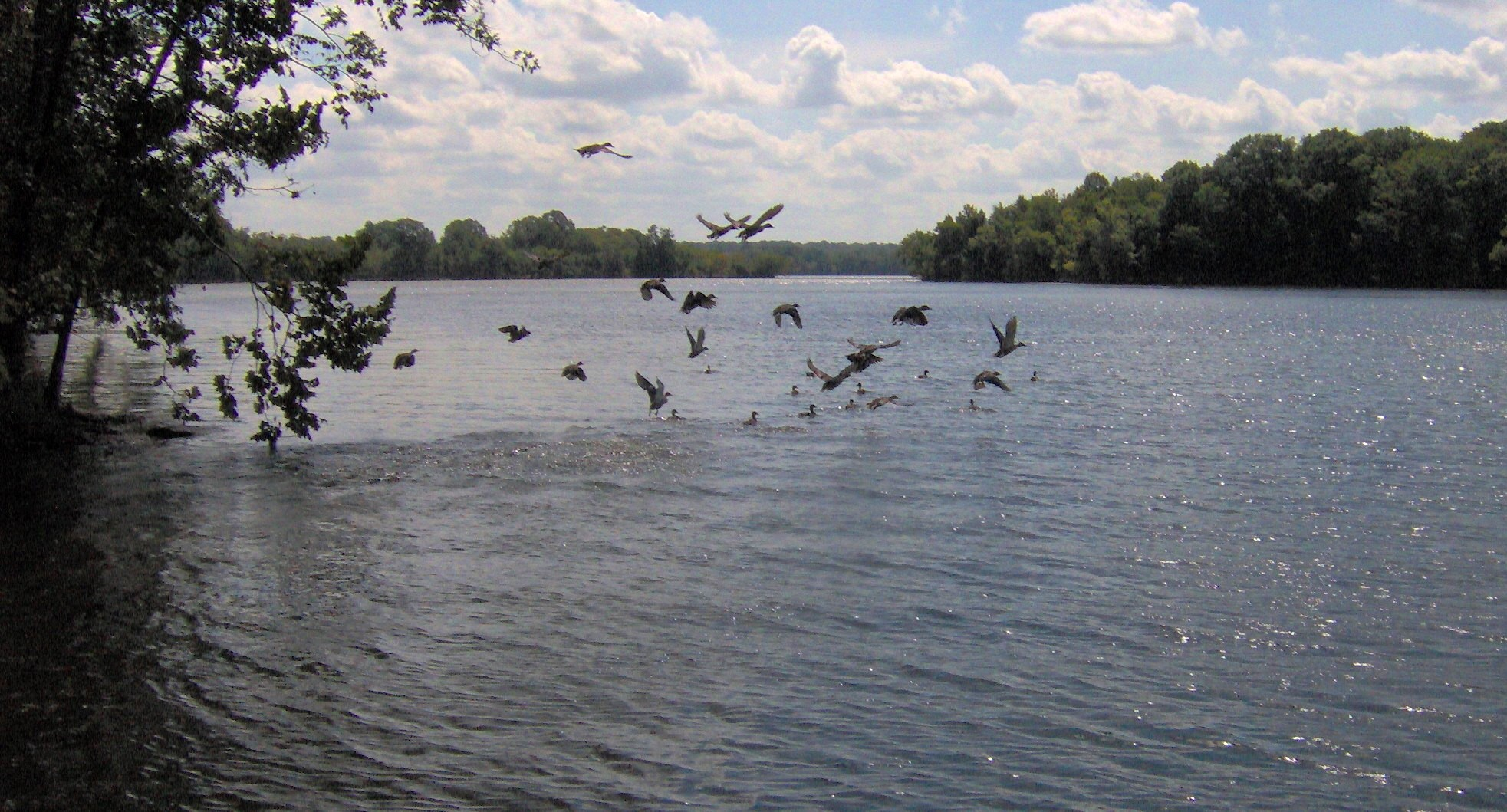
Old Hickory Lake's Bledsoe Creek embayment

The Cumberland River, which enters Tennessee from the mountains of Kentucky to the northeast, flows westward across Sumner County en route to the Nashville area. Old Hickory Lake, created in 1954 by the completion of Old Hickory Dam and Lock near Hendersonville, spans a 97-mile (156 km) section of the river between the dam and Cordell Hull Dam near Carthage. Approximately 30 miles (48 km) upstream from Old Hickory Dam, the Cumberland River absorbs Bledsoe Creek, which flows southward from its source on the northern Highland Rim, forming an embayment that spans the lower 2 miles (3.2 km) of the creek. Bledsoe Creek State Park spans most of the northwest shore of this embayment.

Bledsoe Creek State Park is situated just off Tennessee State Route 25 (Hartsville Pike), roughly halfway between Gallatin and Hartsville, and 35 miles (56 km) northeast of Nashville. The park is located entirely in Sumner County. The park is managed by the Tennessee Department of Environment and Conservation, which leases the land from the U.S. Army Corps of Engineers.

Bledsoe Creek State Park is located in the Central Basin physiographic region. The park's terrain consists of low hills that give way to a flat shoreline. Approximately 68% of the park is forested and 12% is aquatic, with the remainder being open fields or developed land. Fauna include whitetail deer, wild turkey, beaver, bobcat, fox, and muskrat. Bald eagles and golden eagles are occasionally spotted in winter.

== History ==
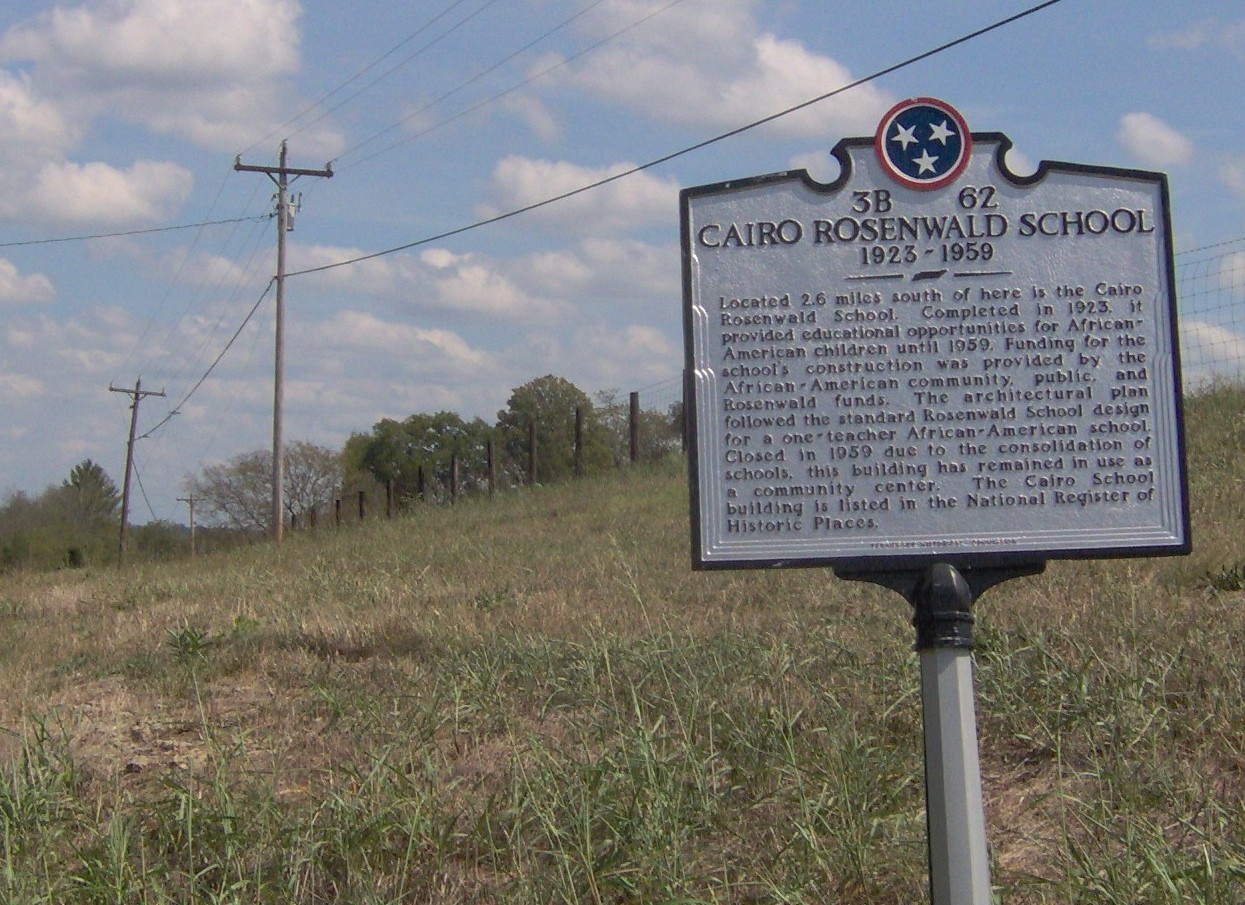
Tennessee Historical Commission marker recalling the Cairo Rosenwald School

Native Americans have been hunting and camping in the Sumner County area for over 12,000 years. Artifacts dating to the Paleo-Indian and Archaic periods have been found in the park's vicinity, and a substantial Mississippian-period (c. 1000-1500 A.D.) village was located at nearby Castalian Springs. The Sumner region was probably part of Shawnee territory throughout the 17th century, although they had been expelled by the Cherokee and Chickasaw by around 1700.

The first major Euro-American expeditions into Sumner County were led by long hunters, so called because the relatively long duration of their hunting expeditions. Long hunter Henry Scaggs was hunting along the Cumberland as early as 1765, and James Smith led the first major long hunting expedition into the Cumberland region in 1766. Between 1769 and 1772, a large group of long hunters were active in the Upper Cumberland region, among them Kasper Mansker and Isaac Bledsoe (c. 1735–1794). At one point the expedition established a base camp along Station Camp Creek (giving the creek its name) a few miles west of modern Gallatin. In 1772, Bledsoe discovered the creek and salt lick that now bear his name (the lick was near modern Castalian Springs). In the early 1780s, at the end of the American Revolution, Bledsoe returned to the salt lick and built Bledsoe's Station, one of a series of small forts erected to protect early Washington District (Middle Tennessee) settlers from hostile Native Americans.

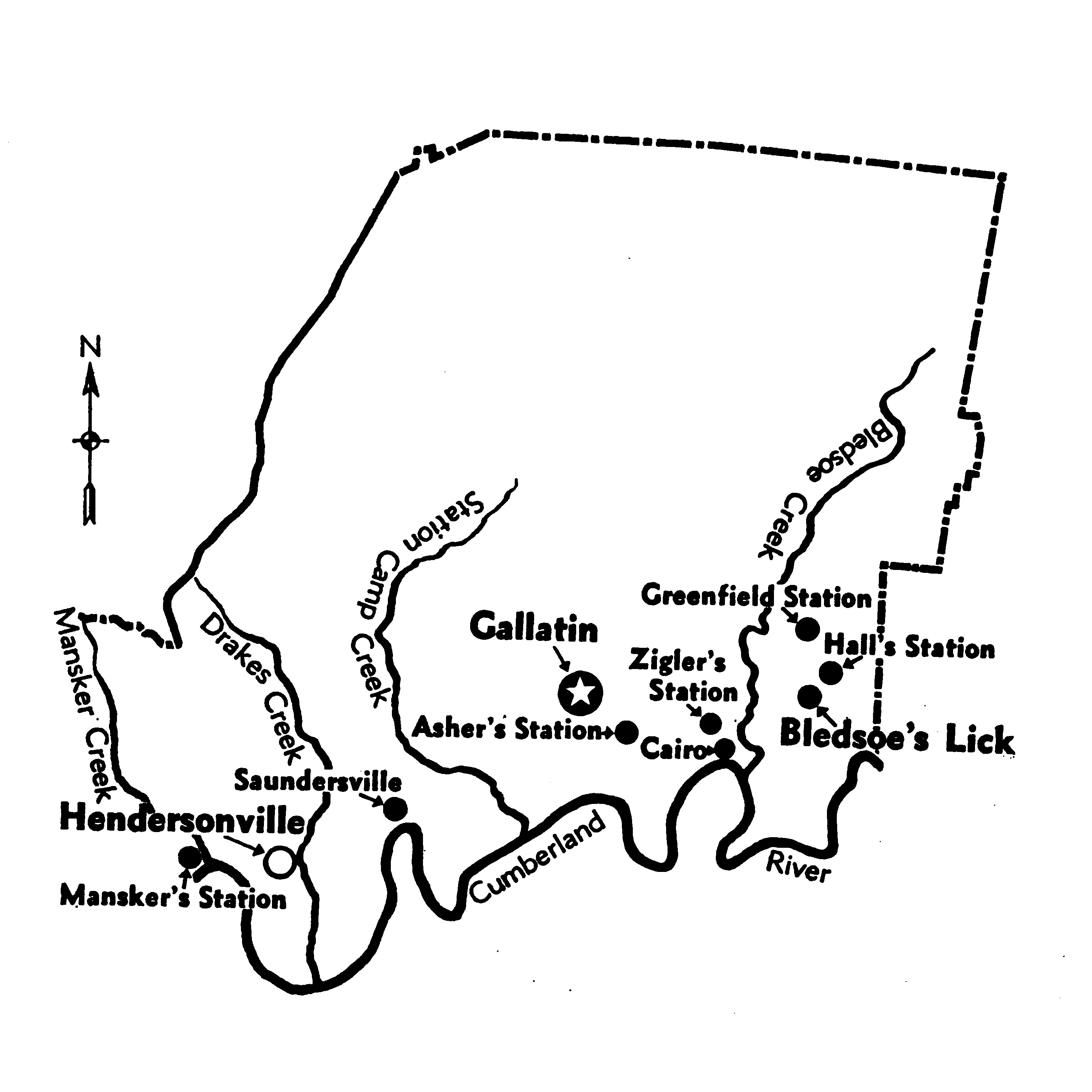
Pioneer map of the Sumner County, Tennessee, showing Cumberland River and tributaries

Hostility between Native Americans and Euro-American settlers increased throughout the 1780s as Euro-American settlers flooded into the Middle Tennessee region. Colonel Anthony Bledsoe (1739–1788), an older brother of Isaac, reported to the governor of North Carolina that 14 settlers had been killed in 1786 alone. Anthony Bledsoe himself was killed in an ambush at Bledsoe's Station the following year. In 1791, Jacob Ziegler built Ziegler's Fort near what is now Bledsoe Creek State Park. The fort was overrun within a few months, however, after a day-long attack that killed Ziegler and several others. The threat of Native American attacks finally subsided in 1794 when the Nickajack Expedition brought an end to the Cherokee–American wars.

After the State of Tennessee was created in 1796, the state's legislature passed a resolution calling for the creation of a county seat for Sumner County. The new city was to be named "Ca Ira" after a song made popular by the French Revolution. Bickering among the county commissioners delayed the establishment of the city for several years, and they eventually decided to place the seat in Gallatin. In 1799, General James Winchester (1752–1826) and William Cage Jr. purchased 150 acres (0.61 km^{2}) immediately south of Ziegler's Fort at the confluence of Bledsoe's Creek and the Cumberland River for the establishment of a town. The new town's name, "Cairo", was either a corruption of Ca Ira—the name chosen for the county seat—or was selected by Winchester, a fan of ancient history. (Winchester was later instrumental in the establishment of Memphis, also named after an Egyptian city).

Cairo quickly became one of the key river trading hubs in the Upper Cumberland region. Winchester and Cage established a mercantile business and a successful flatboat trade between Cairo and New Orleans. By 1812, the city had its own cotton mill, woolen mill, saw mill, gristmill, still house, and tavern. The death of Winchester in 1826 and the improvement and shift of the main road between Knoxville and Nashville away from Sumner, however, led to Cairo's eventual decline. In 1923, the Cairo community took advantage of Rosenwald Funds to establish a school for African-American children, which operated until 1959. The Cairo Rosenwald School, located just north of Bledsoe Creek State Park, was placed on the National Register of Historic Places in 1996.

== The park today ==
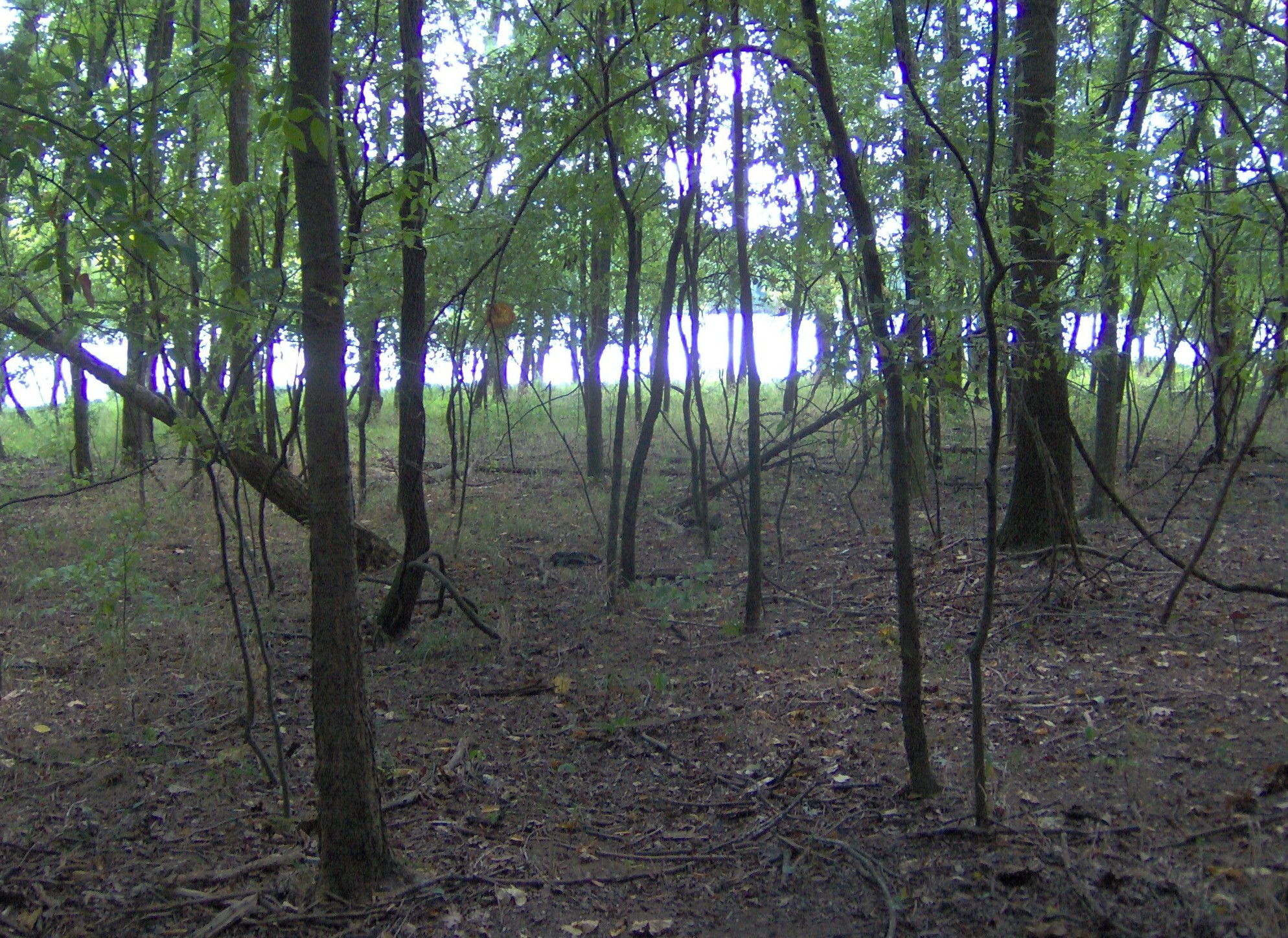
Young forest along the Shoreline Trail

Bledsoe Creek State Park maintains a 77-site campground, two boat ramps, a wedding venue and two picnic shelters along with several playground areas. Located on the backwaters of Old Hickory Lake this destination is popular for recreational fishing and paddling. The park also has a designated wildlife observation deck in the day use picnic area on Raccoon Creek Lane. Various environmental, historical and recreational programs are offered at the outdoor classroom and other facilities within the park.

Over 5 miles (8.0 km) of hiking trails meander through the forest and along the lakeshore of the park. The Shoreline Trail is 1.5 miles (2.4 km) long, mostly following the park's lakeshore and wildlife observation area. The High Ridge Trail is 1.3 miles (2.1 km) long and follows the ridgecrest near the park's northern boundary. The Shoreline and High Ridge trails form a loop of nearly 3 miles (4.8 km). The Owl Ridge Trail is .25 miles (0.40 km) and is a shortcut that connects the High Ridge Trail to Main Park Road. The Mayo Wix Trail is 1.0 mile (1.6 km) paved trail that winds through the woods near the visitor center. The Birdsong Trail is a .3-mile (0.48 km) paved trail that joins the Mayo Wix Trail to the public boat launch. The Woodchuck Hollow Trail is .2 miles (0.32 km) and runs through the group camp area and connects Main Park Road to the end of Woodchuck Hollow Road. The History Trail begins across from Blue Heron Drive and runs parallel to Main Park Road with a permanent recreation long hunter encampment and trade cabin display.

Park officials and volunteers continuously work to catalogue the various plant and animal species found within the park. Funds from Tennessee's Iris License Plate project have helped with the installation of a pollinator garden at the Visitor Center.
