= List of counties in Tennessee =

Counties of Tennessee
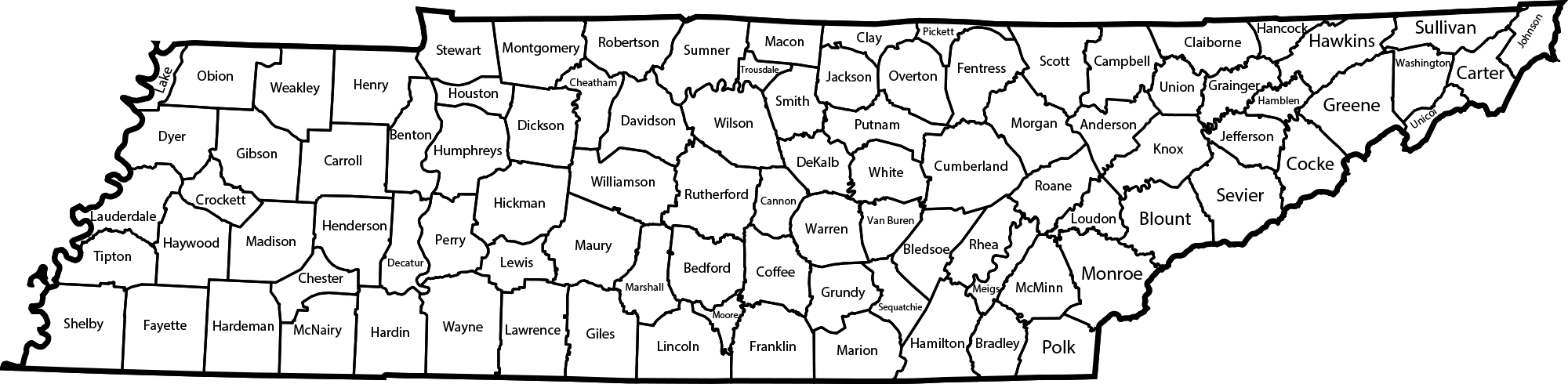
- Location: State of Tennessee
- Number: 95
- Populations: 5,219 (Pickett) - 910,226 (Shelby)
- Areas: 114 sq mi (300 km^{2}) (Trousdale) -755 sq mi (1,960 km^{2}) (Shelby)
- Government: County government
- Subdivisions: Cities, towns, unincorporated communities, census-designated places

There are 95 counties in the U.S. State of Tennessee. As of 2025, Shelby County was Tennessee's most populous county, with 910,226 residents, and the largest county in area, covering an area of 755 sq mi (1,955 km^{2}). The least populous county was Pickett County (5,219) and the smallest in area was Trousdale County, covering 114 sq mi (295 km^{2}). As of the same year, Davidson County, in which the capital Nashville, is located, covers 502 sq mi (1,300 km^{2}) with a population of 745,904. The population of the state of Tennessee as of the 2025 census estimate was 7,315,076 in an area of 42,169 sq mi (109,217 km^{2}). The oldest county is Washington County, founded in 1777. The most recently formed county is Chester County (1879).

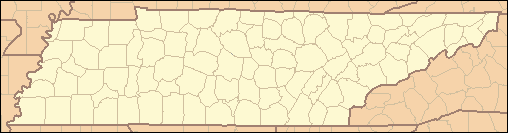

According to the 2020 census, the center of population for Tennessee was located at 35.821189°N 86.332487°W, 3.5 mi (5.6 km) southeast of Murfreesboro in Rutherford County. The center of population pinpoints the location at which the population of the state, as placed on a map of the state where they reside, would balance out the map. The geographic center, the point where the map of Tennessee would balance without the population, is located 5 mi (8 km) northeast of Murfreesboro. In 1976, the Rutherford County Historical Society marked the geographic center of Tennessee with an obelisk.

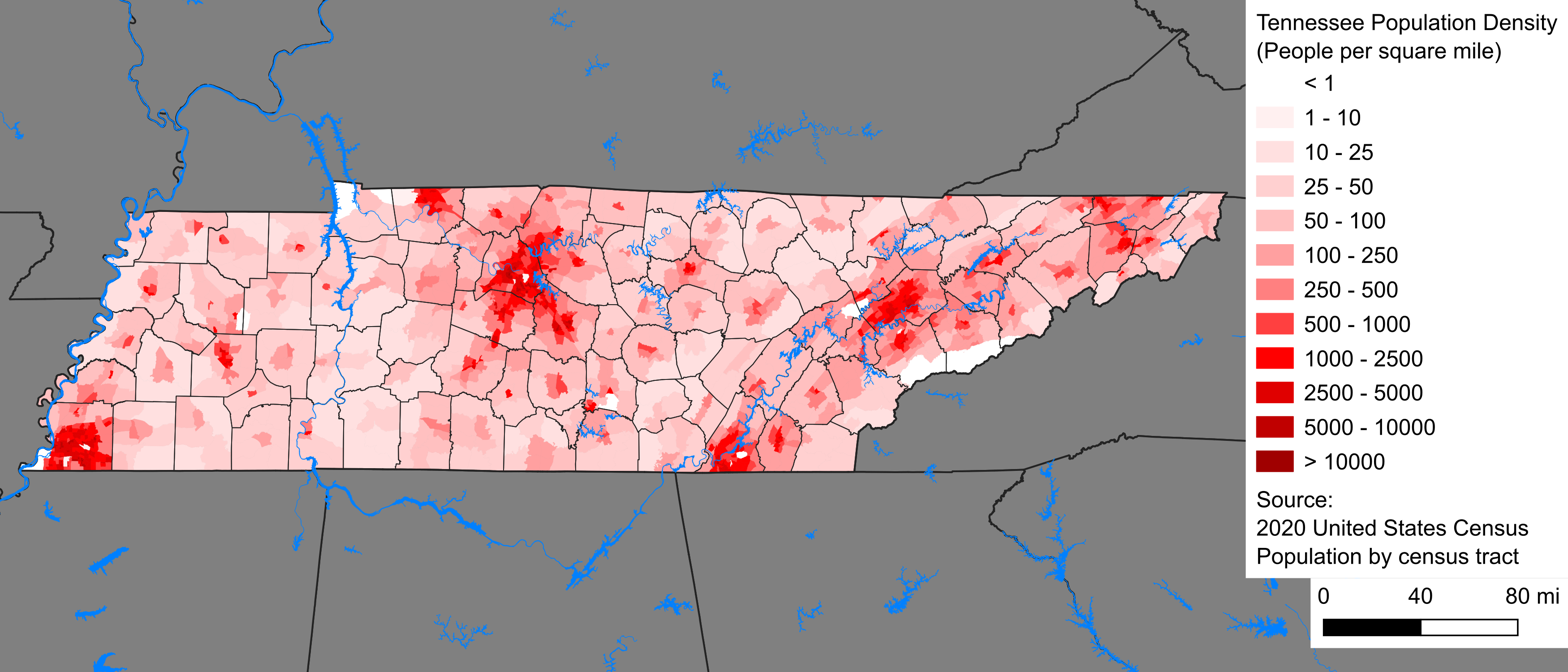
Map showing the population density of Tennessee

Some of the counties were formed in part or completely from lands previously controlled by American Indians. The "Indian lands" were territories that American Indians had occupied from pre-Columbian times and to which they were granted the legal right of occupancy in an act of the United States government. In cases where counties had been formed from that territory, the legal right of American Indian occupancy was revoked in a federal act prior to the formal establishment of the county. For Tennessee, ten treaties were negotiated between 1770 and 1835, defining the areas assigned to European settlers and to American Indians, regulating the right of occupancy regarding the lands. The remaining indigenous population was eventually removed from Tennessee to what became the state of Oklahoma.

The Federal Information Processing Standard (FIPS) code, which is used by the United States government to uniquely identify counties, is provided with each entry. FIPS codes are five-digit numbers; for Tennessee the codes start with 47 and are completed with the three-digit county code. The FIPS code for each county in the table links to census data for that county.

== Alphabetical list ==
County	FIPS code	County seat	Est.	Origin	Etymology	Population	Area	Map
Anderson County	001	Clinton	December 13, 1801	Knox and Grainger Counties	Joseph Anderson (1757–1837), U.S. Senator from Tennessee and first Comptroller of the U.S. Treasury.	82,066	338 sq mi (875 km^{2})	State map highlighting Anderson County
Bedford County	003	Shelbyville	December 3, 1807	Rutherford County	Revolutionary War officer Thomas Bedford, a large landowner in the area	55,273	474 sq mi (1,228 km^{2})	State map highlighting Bedford County
Benton County	005	Camden	January 1, 1836	Humphreys County	Creek War veteran David Benton (1779–1860), an early settler in the county.	16,183	394 sq mi (1,020 km^{2})	State map highlighting Benton County
Bledsoe County	007	Pikeville	November 30, 1807	Roane County and Indian lands	Anthony Bledsoe (1739-1788), Revolutionary War soldier, surveyor, and early settler in Sumner County	15,920	406 sq mi (1,052 km^{2})	State map highlighting Bledsoe County
Blount County	009	Maryville	August 2, 1795	Knox County	William Blount (1749–1800), governor of the Southwest Territory and later U.S. Senator	143,820	559 sq mi (1,448 km^{2})	State map highlighting Blount County
Bradley County	011	Cleveland	February 10, 1836	Indian lands	Tennessee state legislator Edward Bradley.	115,465	329 sq mi (852 km^{2})	State map highlighting Bradley County
Campbell County	013	Jacksboro	September 11, 1806	Anderson and Claiborne counties	Virginia House of Burgesses member Arthur Campbell (1743–1811), who was a negotiator of Indian treaties.	40,290	480 sq mi (1,243 km^{2})	State map highlighting Campbell County
Cannon County	015	Woodbury	January 31, 1836	Rutherford, Smith and Warren counties	Governor of Tennessee Newton Cannon (1781–1841).	15,296	266 sq mi (689 km^{2})	State map highlighting Cannon County
Carroll County	017	Huntingdon	November 7, 1821	Indian lands	William Carroll (1788–1844).	29,200	599 sq mi (1,551 km^{2})	State map highlighting Carroll County
Carter County	019	Elizabethton	April 9, 1796	Washington County	Speaker of the "Lost State of Franklin" Senate; Landon Carter (1760–1800).	57,361	341 sq mi (883 km^{2})	State map highlighting Carter County
Cheatham County	021	Ashland City	April 5, 1856	Davidson, Dickson, Montgomery and Robertson counties	Tennessee state legislator Edward Cheatham and possibly Confederate General Benjamin F. Cheatham.	42,778	303 sq mi (785 km^{2})	State map highlighting Cheatham County
Chester County	023	Henderson	April 1, 1882	Hardeman, Henderson, McNairy and Madison counties	Tennessee state legislator Robert I. Chester.	17,994	289 sq mi (749 km^{2})	State map highlighting Chester County
Claiborne County	025	Tazewell	December 6, 1801	Grainger and Hawkins counties	Governor of Louisiana and Governor of Mississippi Territory William C. C. Claiborne (1775–1817).	33,229	434 sq mi (1,124 km^{2})	State map highlighting Claiborne County
Clay County	027	Celina	December 7, 1870	Jackson and Overton counties	U.S. Speaker of the House and Secretary of State Henry Clay (1777–1852).	7,821	236 sq mi (611 km^{2})	State map highlighting Clay County
Cocke County	029	Newport	October 9, 1797	Jefferson County	William Cocke (1747–1828), one of Tennessee's first U.S. Senators.	37,889	434 sq mi (1,124 km^{2})	State map highlighting Cocke County
Coffee County	031	Manchester	January 8, 1836	Bedford, Warren and Franklin counties	John Coffee (1772–1833), frontiersman, planter, and veteran of Creek War and War of 1812.	62,419	429 sq mi (1,111 km^{2})	State map highlighting Coffee County
Crockett County	033	Alamo	February 19, 1872	Haywood, Madison, Dyer and Gibson counties	Davy Crockett (1786–1836), frontier humorist, Congressman, and defender of the Alamo.	14,006	265 sq mi (686 km^{2})	State map highlighting Crockett County
Cumberland County	035	Crossville	November 16, 1855	White, Bledsoe, Rhea, Morgan, Fentress and Putnam counties	The Cumberland Mountains.	66,300	682 sq mi (1,766 km^{2})	State map highlighting Cumberland County
Davidson County	037	Nashville	May 17, 1783	Part of North Carolina	William Lee Davidson (1746–1781), a Brigadier General who died at the Revolutionary War Battle of Cowan's Ford.	745,904	502 sq mi (1,300 km^{2})	State map highlighting Davidson County
Decatur County	039	Decaturville	April 6, 1846	Perry County	U.S. naval officer and War of 1812 hero Stephen Decatur (1779–1820).	11,820	333 sq mi (862 km^{2})	State map highlighting Decatur County
DeKalb County	041	Smithville	January 13, 1838	Franklin, Cannon, Jackson and White counties	Johann de Kalb (1721–1780), a German-born baron who assisted the Continentals during the American Revolutionary War.	21,873	304 sq mi (787 km^{2})	State map highlighting DeKalb County
Dickson County	043	Charlotte	October 25, 1803	Montgomery and Robertson counties	U.S. Representative William Dickson (1770–1816).	58,662	490 sq mi (1,269 km^{2})	State map highlighting Dickson County
Dyer County	045	Dyersburg	October 16, 1823	Indian lands	Tennessee state legislator Robert Henry Dyer.	36,320	510 sq mi (1,321 km^{2})	State map highlighting Dyer County
Fayette County	047	Somerville	September 29, 1824	Indian lands	Gilbert du Motier, marquis de La Fayette (1757–1834), a French-born general in the American Revolutionary War.	45,071	705 sq mi (1,826 km^{2})	State map highlighting Fayette County
Fentress County	049	Jamestown	November 28, 1823	Morgan, Overton and White counties	Tennessee state legislator James Fentress.	20,322	499 sq mi (1,292 km^{2})	State map highlighting Fentress County
Franklin County	051	Winchester	December 3, 1807	Rutherford County and Indian lands	Publisher, scholar, orator, and Founding Father Benjamin Franklin (1706–1790).	45,579	553 sq mi (1,432 km^{2})	State map highlighting Franklin County
Gibson County	053	Trenton	October 21, 1823	Indian lands	John H. Gibson, a soldier of the Natchez Expedition and the Creek War.	51,779	603 sq mi (1,562 km^{2})	State map highlighting Gibson County
Giles County	055	Pulaski	January 1, 1810	Indian lands	U.S. Senator and Governor of Virginia William B. Giles (1762–1830).	31,433	611 sq mi (1,582 km^{2})	State map highlighting Giles County
Grainger County	057	Rutledge	April 22, 1796	Hawkins and Knox counties	Mary Grainger Blount, wife of William Blount and "first lady" of the Southwest Territory, which later became Tennessee.	25,739	280 sq mi (725 km^{2})	State map highlighting Grainger County
Greene County	059	Greeneville	May 17, 1783	Washington County	American Revolutionary War general Nathanael Greene (1742–1786).	73,831	622 sq mi (1,611 km^{2})	State map highlighting Greene County
Grundy County	061	Altamont	May 27, 1844	Coffee, Warren and Franklin counties	U.S. Attorney General Felix Grundy (1777–1840).	14,116	361 sq mi (935 km^{2})	State map highlighting Grundy County
Hamblen County	063	Morristown	July 19, 1870	Jefferson, Grainger and Greene counties	Early settler Hezekiah Hamblen.	68,843	161 sq mi (417 km^{2})	State map highlighting Hamblen County
Hamilton County	065	Chattanooga	October 25, 1819	Rhea County and Indian lands	First U.S. Secretary of the Treasury and Founding Father Alexander Hamilton (1755 or 1757–1804).	390,833	543 sq mi (1,406 km^{2})	State map highlighting Hamilton County
Hancock County	067	Sneedville	January 29, 1846	Hawkins and Claiborne counties	President of the Continental Congress John Hancock (1737–1793).	7,075	222 sq mi (575 km^{2})	State map highlighting Hancock County
Hardeman County	069	Bolivar	October 16, 1823	Hardin County and Indian lands	Thomas Jones Hardeman, Creek War and War of 1812 soldier, later a member of the Republic of Texas legislature.	25,274	668 sq mi (1,730 km^{2})	State map highlighting Hardeman County
Hardin County	071	Savannah	November 13, 1819	Indian lands	Joseph Hardin, legislator of the Southwest Territory and State of Franklin.	27,983	578 sq mi (1,497 km^{2})	State map highlighting Hardin County
Hawkins County	073	Rogersville	January 6, 1787	Sullivan County	U.S. Senator Benjamin Hawkins (1754–1816).	59,559	487 sq mi (1,261 km^{2})	State map highlighting Hawkins County
Haywood County	075	Brownsville	January 1, 1824	Indian lands	Judge John Haywood (1762–1826), called "the father of Tennessee history."	17,042	533 sq mi (1,380 km^{2})	State map highlighting Haywood County
Henderson County	077	Lexington	November 7, 1821	Indian lands	James Henderson, an officer of the War of 1812.	28,518	520 sq mi (1,347 km^{2})	State map highlighting Henderson County
Henry County	079	Paris	November 7, 1821	Indian lands	Revolutionary-era orator and Virginia legislator Patrick Henry (1736–1799).	32,896	562 sq mi (1,456 km^{2})	State map highlighting Henry County
Hickman County	081	Centerville	January 1, 1808	Dickson County	Edwin Hickman, a longhunter killed by Native Americans near the present-day site of Centerville.	26,219	613 sq mi (1,588 km^{2})	State map highlighting Hickman County
Houston County	083	Erin	February 23, 1871	Dickson, Humphreys, Montgomery and Stewart counties	Sam Houston (1793–1863), Tennessee governor and congressman, president of the Republic of Texas, U.S. Senator from Texas, and Texas governor.	8,479	200 sq mi (518 km^{2})	State map highlighting Houston County
Humphreys County	085	Waverly	October 19, 1809	Stewart County	U.S. Representative Parry Wayne Humphreys (1778–1839).	19,646	532 sq mi (1,378 km^{2})	State map highlighting Humphreys County
Jackson County	087	Gainesboro	November 6, 1801	Smith County and Indian lands	U.S. President Andrew Jackson (1767–1845).	12,466	309 sq mi (800 km^{2})	State map highlighting Jackson County
Jefferson County	089	Dandridge	June 15, 1792	Greene and Hawkins counties	U.S. President and Founding Father Thomas Jefferson (1743–1826).	60,024	274 sq mi (710 km^{2})	State map highlighting Jefferson County
Johnson County	091	Mountain City	January 2, 1836	Carter County	Thomas Johnson, an early settler of Carter County along the Doe River.	18,718	299 sq mi (774 km^{2})	State map highlighting Johnson County
Knox County	093	Knoxville	June 15, 1792	Greene and Hawkins counties	Henry Knox (1750–1806), the first U.S. Secretary of War.	511,453	509 sq mi (1,318 km^{2})	State map highlighting Knox County
Lake County	095	Tiptonville	June 24, 1870	Obion County	Reelfoot Lake	6,249	163 sq mi (422 km^{2})	State map highlighting Lake County
Lauderdale County	097	Ripley	November 24, 1835	Haywood, Dyer and Tipton counties	James Lauderdale, who was killed in the War of 1812.	24,617	470 sq mi (1,217 km^{2})	State map highlighting Lauderdale County
Lawrence County	099	Lawrenceburg	October 21, 1817	Hickman County and Indian lands	U.S. naval officer and War of 1812 hero James Lawrence (1781–1813).	46,914	617 sq mi (1,598 km^{2})	State map highlighting Lawrence County
Lewis County	101	Hohenwald	December 21, 1843	Hickman, Lawrence, Maury and Wayne counties	Meriwether Lewis (1774–1809), explorer of the American West.	13,487	282 sq mi (730 km^{2})	State map highlighting Lewis County
Lincoln County	103	Fayetteville	January 1, 1810	Bedford County	U.S. Secretary of War Benjamin Lincoln (1733–1810).	36,853	570 sq mi (1,476 km^{2})	State map highlighting Lincoln County
Loudon County	105	Loudon	June 18, 1870	Roane, Monroe, Blount and McMinn counties	Fort Loudoun, which was named for John Campbell, 4th Earl of Loudoun, who led British and American forces during the French and Indian War.	63,764	229 sq mi (593 km^{2})	State map highlighting Loudon County
Macon County	111	Lafayette	January 18, 1842	Smith and Sumner counties	U.S. Senator Nathaniel Macon (1758–1837).	27,663	307 sq mi (795 km^{2})	State map highlighting Macon County
Madison County	113	Jackson	November 7, 1821	Indian lands	U.S. President James Madison (1758–1836).	100,790	557 sq mi (1,443 km^{2})	State map highlighting Madison County
Marion County	115	Jasper	December 26, 1817	Indian lands	Francis Marion (1732–1795), the "Swamp Fox" of the American Revolutionary War.	29,804	500 sq mi (1,295 km^{2})	State map highlighting Marion County
Marshall County	117	Lewisburg	April 7, 1836	Giles, Bedford, Lincoln and Maury counties	U.S. Chief Justice John Marshall (1755–1835).	38,071	375 sq mi (971 km^{2})	State map highlighting Marshall County
Maury County	119	Columbia	December 15, 1807	Williamson County and Indian lands	Tennessee state senator Abram Maury, Sr. (1766–1825), father of U.S. Representative Abram Poindexter Maury.	118,131	613 sq mi (1,588 km^{2})	State map highlighting Maury County
McMinn County	107	Athens	November 13, 1819	Indian lands	Governor of Tennessee Joseph McMinn (1758–1824).	57,404	430 sq mi (1,114 km^{2})	State map highlighting McMinn County
McNairy County	109	Selmer	January 1, 1824	Hardin County	John McNairy, judge of the U.S. District Court for the District of Tennessee.	26,236	560 sq mi (1,450 km^{2})	State map highlighting McNairy County
Meigs County	121	Decatur	January 20, 1836	Rhea County	Return Jonathan Meigs (1740–1823), an officer in the Continental Army who was for many years a federal Indian and military agent in Tennessee.	14,186	195 sq mi (505 km^{2})	State map highlighting Meigs County
Monroe County	123	Madisonville	November 13, 1819	Indian lands	U.S. President James Monroe (1758–1831).	49,730	635 sq mi (1,645 km^{2})	State map highlighting Monroe County
Montgomery County	125	Clarksville	April 9, 1796	Tennessee County	John Montgomery (c. 1750–1794), leader of the Nickajack Expedition.	249,935	539 sq mi (1,396 km^{2})	State map highlighting Montgomery County
Moore County	127	Lynchburg	April 13, 1872	Bedford, Lincoln and Franklin counties	Tennessee state legislator William Moore.	6,920	129 sq mi (334 km^{2})	State map highlighting Moore County
Morgan County	129	Wartburg	January 1, 1818	Anderson and Roane counties	American Revolutionary War officer Daniel Morgan (1736–1802).	22,160	522 sq mi (1,352 km^{2})	State map highlighting Morgan County
Obion County	131	Union City	October 24, 1823	Indian lands	The Obion River.	30,067	545 sq mi (1,412 km^{2})	State map highlighting Obion County
Overton County	133	Livingston	September 11, 1806	Jackson County and Indian lands	John Overton (1766–1833), one of the cofounders of Memphis, Tennessee.	23,787	433 sq mi (1,121 km^{2})	State map highlighting Overton County
Perry County	135	Linden	November 18, 1819	Humphreys and Hickman counties	U.S. naval officer and War of 1812 hero Oliver Hazard Perry (1785–1819).	9,126	415 sq mi (1,075 km^{2})	State map highlighting Perry County
Pickett County	137	Byrdstown	April 30, 1881	Fentress and Overton counties	Tennessee state legislator Howell L. Pickett (1847 - 1914).	5,219	163 sq mi (422 km^{2})	State map highlighting Pickett County
Polk County	139	Benton	November 28, 1839	McMinn and Bradley counties	U.S. President James K. Polk (1795–1849).	18,592	435 sq mi (1,127 km^{2})	State map highlighting Polk County
Putnam County	141	Cookeville	February 2, 1842	Fentress, Jackson, Smith, White and Overton counties	American Revolutionary War officer Israel Putnam (1718–1790).	86,612	401 sq mi (1,039 km^{2})	State map highlighting Putnam County
Rhea County	143	Dayton	November 30, 1807	Roane County	U.S. Representative John Rhea (1753–1832).	34,844	316 sq mi (818 km^{2})	State map highlighting Rhea County
Roane County	145	Kingston	December 20, 1801	Knox County and Indian lands	Governor of Tennessee Archibald Roane (1759 or 1760–1819).	57,395	361 sq mi (935 km^{2})	State map highlighting Roane County
Robertson County	147	Springfield	April 9, 1796	Tennessee and Sumner counties	James Robertson (1742–1814), Tennessee state legislator and founder of the Watauga Settlements.	80,175	477 sq mi (1,235 km^{2})	State map highlighting Robertson County
Rutherford County	149	Murfreesboro	October 25, 1803	Davidson, Williamson and Wilson counties	Griffith Rutherford, chairman of the legislature of the Southwest Territory.	386,352	619 sq mi (1,603 km^{2})	State map highlighting Rutherford County
Scott County	151	Huntsville	December 17, 1849	Anderson, Campbell, Fentress and Morgan counties	US. Army general and hero of the Mexican–American War Winfield Scott (1786–1866).	22,671	532 sq mi (1,378 km^{2})	State map highlighting Scott County
Sequatchie County	153	Dunlap	December 9, 1857	Hamilton, Marion and Warren counties	Cherokee word believed to mean, opossum, he grins or runs.	17,861	266 sq mi (689 km^{2})	State map highlighting Sequatchie County
Sevier County	155	Sevierville	September 27, 1794	Jefferson County	John Sevier (1745–1815), governor of the State of Franklin and first Governor of Tennessee.	101,342	592 sq mi (1,533 km^{2})	State map highlighting Sevier County
Shelby County	157	Memphis	November 24, 1819	Chickasaw Nation lands acquired through the Jackson Purchase.	Isaac Shelby (1750–1826), commander at Kings Mountain, first governor of Kentucky, and negotiator of the purchase of the western district from the Chickasaws.	910,226	755 sq mi (1,955 km^{2})	State map highlighting Shelby County
Smith County	159	Carthage	October 26, 1799	Sumner County and Indian lands	American Revolutionary War officer and U.S. Senator Daniel Smith (1748–1818).	20,981	314 sq mi (813 km^{2})	State map highlighting Smith County
Stewart County	161	Dover	November 1, 1803	Montgomery County	Duncan Stewart, Tennessee state legislator and lieutenant governor of Mississippi Territory.	14,439	458 sq mi (1,186 km^{2})	State map highlighting Stewart County
Sullivan County	163	Blountville	November 10, 1779	Washington County	Governor of New Hampshire John Sullivan (1740–1795).	163,759	413 sq mi (1,070 km^{2})	State map highlighting Sullivan County
Sumner County	165	Gallatin	January 6, 1787	Davidson County	Jethro Sumner (1733–1785), an American colonist who defended North Carolina against the British in 1780.	215,538	529 sq mi (1,370 km^{2})	State map highlighting Sumner County
Tipton County	167	Covington	October 29, 1823	Shelby County (previously Chickasaw lands)	Jacob Tipton, father of Armistead Blevins, who supervised the organization of Shelby County; Tipton was killed by Native Americans in 1791 in a conflict over the Northwest Territory.	62,287	459 sq mi (1,189 km^{2})	State map highlighting Tipton County
Trousdale County	169	Hartsville	July 12, 1870	Wilson, Macon, Smith and Sumner counties	William Trousdale (1790–1872), Creek and Mexican–American War soldier and officer, state senator and Governor of Tennessee.	12,623	114 sq mi (295 km^{2})	State map highlighting Trousdale County
Unicoi County	171	Erwin	October 21, 1875	Washington and Carter County	Native American word for the southern Appalachian Mountains, probably meaning white or fog-draped	17,856	186 sq mi (482 km^{2})	State map highlighting Unicoi County
Union County	173	Maynardville	January 26, 1854	Grainger, Claiborne, Campbell, Anderson and Knox counties	Either for its creation from parts of five counties or to memorialize East Tennessee's support for preservation of the Union	21,450	224 sq mi (580 km^{2})	State map highlighting Union County
Van Buren County	175	Spencer	January 3, 1840	Warren and White counties	U.S. President Martin Van Buren (1782–1862)	6,874	247 sq mi (640 km^{2})	State map highlighting Van Buren County
Warren County	177	McMinnville	November 26, 1807	White, Jackson, Smith counties and Indian lands	American Revolutionary War officer Joseph Warren (1741–1775), who sent Paul Revere on his famous midnight ride	43,717	433 sq mi (1,121 km^{2})	State map highlighting Warren County
Washington County	179	Jonesborough	December 24, 1777	Part of North Carolina	U.S. President George Washington (1732–1799)	141,199	326 sq mi (844 km^{2})	State map highlighting Washington County
Wayne County	181	Waynesboro	November 24, 1817	Hickman County	American Revolutionary War General "Mad" Anthony Wayne (1745–1796)	16,416	734 sq mi (1,901 km^{2})	State map highlighting Wayne County
Weakley County	183	Dresden	October 21, 1823	Indian lands	U.S. Representative Robert Weakley (1764–1845).	33,261	580 sq mi (1,502 km^{2})	State map highlighting Weakley County
White County	185	Sparta	September 11, 1806	Jackson and Smith counties	John White, Revolutionary War soldier and the first European-American settler in the county	29,612	377 sq mi (976 km^{2})	State map highlighting White County
Williamson County	187	Franklin	October 26, 1799	Davidson County	U.S. Representative Hugh Williamson (1735–1819).	272,061	582 sq mi (1,507 km^{2})	State map highlighting Williamson County
Wilson County	189	Lebanon	October 26, 1799	Sumner County	David Wilson, a member of the legislatures of North Carolina and the Southwest Territory.	175,033	571 sq mi (1,479 km^{2})	State map highlighting Wilson County

== Racial / Ethnic Profile of counties in Tennessee (2020 Census) ==
Racial / Ethnic Profile of counties in Tennessee (2020 Census)
Following is a table of counties in Tennessee by race/ethnicity. The majority racial/ethnic group is coded per the key below.

Majority minority with no dominant group
Majority White
Majority Black
Majority Hispanic
Majority Asian

Racial and ethnic composition of counties in Tennessee (2020 Census) (NH = Non-Hispanic) Note: the US Census treats Hispanic/Latino as an ethnic category. This table excludes Latinos from the racial categories and assigns them to a separate category. Hispanics/Latinos may be of any race.
County	Location of County	Total Population	White alone (NH)	%	Black or African American alone (NH)	%	Native American or Alaska Native alone (NH)	%	Asian alone (NH)	%	Pacific Islander alone (NH)	%	Other race alone (NH)	%	Mixed race or Multiracial (NH)	%	Hispanic or Latino (any race)	%
Anderson		77,123	66,044	85.63%	2,841	3.68%	217	0.28%	975	1.26%	53	0.07%	272	0.35%	3,901	5.06%	2,820	3.66%
Bedford		50,237	36,499	72.65%	3,563	7.09%	127	0.25%	337	0.67%	13	0.03%	140	0.28%	1,893	3.77%	7,665	15.26%
Benton		15,864	14,378	90.63%	316	1.99%	50	0.32%	107	0.67%	4	0.03%	30	0.19%	604	3.81%	375	2.36%
Bledsoe		14,913	13,129	88.04%	781	5.24%	48	0.32%	37	0.25%	0	0.00%	2	0.01%	457	3.06%	459	3.08%
Blount		135,280	117,952	87.19%	3,552	2.63%	339	0.25%	1,280	0.95%	23	0.02%	439	0.32%	5,986	4.42%	5,709	4.22%
Bradley		108,620	87,830	80.86%	5,105	4.70%	271	0.25%	1,188	1.09%	117	0.11%	348	0.32%	5,300	4.88%	8,461	7.79%
Campbell		39,272	37,101	94.47%	130	0.33%	77	0.20%	94	0.24%	0	0.00%	87	0.22%	1,283	3.27%	500	1.27%
Cannon		14,506	13,064	90.06%	192	1.32%	25	0.17%	38	0.26%	4	0.03%	41	0.28%	747	5.15%	395	2.72%
Carroll		28,440	23,744	83.49%	2,445	8.60%	75	0.26%	124	0.44%	5	0.02%	104	0.37%	1,174	4.13%	769	2.70%
Carter		56,356	51,790	91.90%	702	1.25%	153	0.27%	231	0.41%	7	0.01%	108	0.19%	2,184	3.88%	1,181	2.10%
Cheatham		41,072	36,299	88.38%	815	1.98%	92	0.22%	184	0.45%	25	0.06%	127	0.31%	1,691	4.12%	1,839	4.48%
Chester		17,341	14,471	83.45%	1,494	8.62%	52	0.30%	70	0.40%	0	0.00%	62	0.36%	664	3.83%	528	3.04%
Claiborne		32,043	29,966	93.52%	314	0.98%	58	0.18%	148	0.46%	11	0.03%	87	0.27%	969	3.02%	490	1.53%
Clay		7,581	7,202	95.00%	76	1.00%	17	0.22%	5	0.07%	1	0.01%	4	0.05%	146	1.93%	130	1.71%
Cocke		35,999	32,733	90.93%	582	1.62%	126	0.35%	150	0.42%	9	0.03%	46	0.13%	1,399	3.89%	954	2.65%
Coffee		57,889	48,983	84.62%	2,097	3.62%	145	0.25%	611	1.06%	37	0.06%	171	0.30%	2,586	4.47%	3,259	5.63%
Crockett		13,911	10,056	72.29%	1,879	13.51%	19	0.14%	25	0.18%	1	0.01%	50	0.36%	383	2.75%	1,498	10.77%
Cumberland		61,145	56,313	92.10%	299	0.49%	130	0.21%	366	0.60%	12	0.02%	102	0.17%	1,987	3.25%	1,936	3.17%
Davidson		715,884	386,835	54.04%	171,489	23.95%	1,309	0.18%	27,660	3.86%	303	0.04%	3,210	0.45%	26,959	3.77%	98,119	13.71%
Decatur		11,435	10,462	91.49%	270	2.36%	9	0.08%	42	0.37%	5	0.04%	15	0.13%	274	2.40%	358	3.13%
DeKalb		20,080	17,526	87.28%	234	1.17%	44	0.22%	76	0.38%	5	0.02%	53	0.26%	693	3.45%	1,449	7.22%
Dickson		54,315	46,994	86.52%	1,931	3.56%	181	0.33%	310	0.57%	4	0.01%	160	0.29%	2,153	3.96%	2,582	4.75%
Dyer		36,801	28,272	76.82%	5,335	14.50%	81	0.22%	213	0.58%	11	0.03%	100	0.27%	1,486	4.04%	1,303	3.54%
Fayette		41,990	27,558	65.63%	11,038	26.29%	59	0.14%	269	0.64%	18	0.04%	158	0.38%	1,460	3.48%	1,430	3.41%
Fentress		18,489	17,541	94.87%	25	0.14%	26	0.14%	33	0.18%	0	0.00%	18	0.10%	530	2.87%	316	1.71%
Franklin		42,774	36,864	86.18%	1,962	4.59%	117	0.27%	348	0.81%	17	0.04%	237	0.55%	1,727	4.04%	1,502	3.51%
Gibson		50,429	37,930	75.21%	8,929	17.71%	97	0.19%	200	0.40%	15	0.03%	112	0.22%	1,707	3.38%	1,439	2.85%
Giles		30,346	24,920	82.12%	2,927	9.65%	113	0.37%	176	0.58%	9	0.03%	75	0.25%	1,398	4.61%	728	2.40%
Grainger		23,527	21,748	92.44%	118	0.50%	42	0.18%	53	0.23%	2	0.01%	33	0.14%	758	3.22%	773	3.29%
Greene		70,152	63,143	90.01%	1,308	1.86%	142	0.20%	299	0.43%	14	0.02%	194	0.28%	2,517	3.59%	2,535	3.61%
Grundy		13,529	12,620	93.28%	38	0.28%	33	0.24%	44	0.33%	0	0.00%	22	0.16%	597	4.41%	175	1.29%
Hamblen		64,499	49,197	76.28%	2,106	3.27%	130	0.20%	712	1.10%	268	0.42%	152	0.24%	2,451	3.80%	9,483	14.70%
Hamilton		366,207	249,939	68.25%	63,979	17.47%	770	0.21%	8,139	2.22%	131	0.04%	1,269	0.35%	14,905	4.07%	27,075	7.39%
Hancock		6,662	6,391	95.93%	33	0.50%	25	0.38%	1	0.02%	0	0.00%	11	0.17%	161	2.42%	40	0.60%
Hardeman		25,462	13,970	54.87%	10,150	39.86%	46	0.18%	162	0.64%	6	0.02%	68	0.27%	566	2.22%	494	1.94%
Hardin		26,831	24,272	90.46%	805	3.00%	81	0.30%	148	0.55%	0	0.00%	53	0.20%	907	3.38%	565	2.11%
Hawkins		56,721	52,824	93.13%	671	1.18%	104	0.18%	256	0.45%	13	0.02%	110	0.19%	1,854	3.27%	889	1.57%
Haywood		17,864	7,554	42.29%	8,993	50.34%	33	0.18%	26	0.15%	6	0.03%	56	0.31%	358	2.00%	838	4.69%
Henderson		27,842	23,890	85.81%	1,931	6.94%	53	0.19%	90	0.32%	2	0.01%	81	0.29%	1,076	3.86%	719	2.58%
Henry		32,199	27,250	84.63%	2,307	7.16%	76	0.24%	202	0.63%	7	0.02%	125	0.39%	1,355	4.21%	877	2.72%
Hickman		24,925	22,086	88.61%	931	3.74%	101	0.41%	72	0.29%	1	0.00%	53	0.21%	1,000	4.01%	681	2.73%
Houston		8,283	7,491	90.44%	200	2.41%	32	0.39%	16	0.19%	8	0.10%	40	0.48%	294	3.55%	202	2.44%
Humphreys		18,990	17,102	90.06%	494	2.60%	43	0.23%	57	0.30%	0	0.00%	74	0.39%	771	4.06%	449	2.36%
Jackson		11,617	10,778	92.78%	31	0.27%	35	0.30%	17	0.15%	0	0.00%	28	0.24%	483	4.16%	245	2.11%
Jefferson		54,683	48,975	89.56%	787	1.44%	159	0.29%	257	0.47%	20	0.04%	157	0.29%	1,936	3.54%	2,392	4.37%
Johnson		17,948	16,126	89.85%	724	4.03%	28	0.16%	27	0.15%	9	0.05%	8	0.04%	510	2.84%	516	2.87%
Knox		478,971	373,790	78.04%	39,853	8.32%	1,079	0.23%	11,881	2.48%	300	0.06%	1,776	0.37%	21,724	4.54%	28,568	5.96%
Lake		7,005	4,755	67.88%	1,832	26.15%	15	0.21%	12	0.17%	5	0.07%	5	0.07%	206	2.94%	175	2.50%
Lauderdale		25,143	15,016	59.72%	8,385	33.35%	133	0.53%	53	0.21%	0	0.00%	62	0.25%	907	3.61%	587	2.33%
Lawrence		44,159	40,368	91.42%	694	1.57%	92	0.21%	167	0.38%	1	0.00%	120	0.27%	1,600	3.62%	1,117	2.53%
Lewis		12,582	11,510	91.48%	184	1.46%	31	0.25%	55	0.44%	5	0.04%	36	0.29%	435	3.46%	326	2.59%
Lincoln		35,319	29,803	84.38%	2,198	6.22%	116	0.33%	178	0.50%	16	0.05%	81	0.23%	1,659	4.70%	1,268	3.59%
Loudon		54,886	46,419	84.57%	578	1.05%	95	0.17%	450	0.82%	2	0.00%	161	0.29%	1,825	3.33%	5,356	9.76%
McMinn		53,276	45,993	86.33%	1,842	3.46%	140	0.26%	430	0.81%	17	0.03%	107	0.20%	2,586	4.85%	2,161	4.06%
McNairy		25,866	22,847	88.33%	1,545	5.97%	55	0.21%	78	0.30%	0	0.00%	51	0.20%	852	3.29%	438	1.69%
Macon		25,216	22,439	88.99%	120	0.48%	60	0.24%	44	0.17%	8	0.03%	34	0.13%	827	3.28%	1,684	6.68%
Madison		98,823	53,264	53.90%	35,837	36.26%	175	0.18%	1,227	1.24%	13	0.01%	359	0.36%	3,226	3.26%	4,722	4.78%
Marion		28,837	25,689	89.08%	1,033	3.58%	93	0.32%	148	0.51%	2	0.01%	53	0.18%	1,218	4.22%	601	2.08%
Marshall		34,318	28,255	82.33%	2,018	5.88%	103	0.30%	142	0.41%	7	0.02%	93	0.27%	1,465	4.27%	2,235	6.51%
Maury		100,974	76,182	75.45%	11,241	11.13%	248	0.25%	934	0.92%	45	0.04%	383	0.38%	4,281	4.24%	7,660	7.59%
Meigs		12,758	11,823	92.67%	131	1.03%	58	0.45%	26	0.20%	1	0.01%	38	0.30%	461	3.61%	220	1.72%
Monroe		46,250	41,185	89.05%	736	1.59%	141	0.30%	194	0.42%	2	0.00%	85	0.18%	1,970	4.26%	1,937	4.19%
Montgomery		220,069	131,294	59.66%	43,349	19.70%	757	0.34%	5,039	2.29%	936	0.43%	1,207	0.55%	14,553	6.61%	22,934	10.42%
Moore		6,461	5,999	92.85%	103	1.59%	17	0.26%	29	0.45%	1	0.02%	10	0.15%	201	3.11%	101	1.56%
Morgan		21,035	19,029	90.46%	971	4.62%	54	0.26%	41	0.19%	8	0.04%	64	0.30%	569	2.71%	299	1.42%
Obion		30,787	24,736	80.35%	3,137	10.19%	50	0.16%	103	0.33%	0	0.00%	67	0.22%	1,120	3.64%	1,574	5.11%
Overton		22,511	21,223	94.28%	86	0.38%	60	0.27%	61	0.27%	0	0.00%	31	0.14%	706	3.14%	344	1.53%
Perry		8,366	7,700	92.04%	195	2.33%	41	0.49%	26	0.31%	1	0.01%	21	0.25%	255	3.05%	127	1.52%
Pickett		5,001	4,811	96.20%	8	0.16%	8	0.16%	15	0.30%	1	0.02%	5	0.10%	70	1.40%	83	1.66%
Polk		17,544	16,313	92.98%	61	0.35%	59	0.34%	33	0.19%	10	0.06%	23	0.13%	748	4.26%	297	1.69%
Putnam		79,854	66,782	83.63%	2,161	2.71%	161	0.20%	1,086	1.36%	33	0.04%	179	0.22%	3,196	4.00%	6,256	7.83%
Rhea		32,870	28,641	87.13%	598	1.82%	100	0.30%	195	0.59%	6	0.02%	69	0.21%	1,301	3.96%	1,960	5.96%
Roane		53,404	48,094	90.06%	1,302	2.44%	161	0.30%	341	0.64%	19	0.04%	157	0.29%	2,319	4.34%	1,011	1.89%
Robertson		72,803	57,049	78.36%	5,091	6.99%	139	0.19%	447	0.61%	21	0.03%	246	0.34%	2,932	4.03%	6,878	9.45%
Rutherford		341,486	219,194	64.19%	53,270	15.60%	789	0.23%	12,394	3.63%	219	0.06%	1,642	0.48%	15,661	4.59%	38,317	11.22%
Scott		21,850	20,957	95.91%	32	0.15%	36	0.16%	51	0.23%	0	0.00%	6	0.03%	563	2.58%	205	0.94%
Sequatchie		15,826	14,409	91.05%	72	0.45%	49	0.31%	65	0.41%	4	0.03%	42	0.27%	564	3.56%	621	3.92%
Sevier		98,380	83,801	85.18%	766	0.78%	312	0.32%	1,103	1.12%	24	0.02%	254	0.26%	3,506	3.56%	8,614	8.76%
Shelby		929,744	316,740	34.07%	475,074	51.10%	1,561	0.17%	27,960	3.01%	256	0.03%	3,614	0.39%	26,832	2.89%	77,707	8.36%
Smith		19,904	18,054	90.71%	356	1.79%	61	0.31%	84	0.42%	0	0.00%	20	0.10%	811	4.07%	518	2.60%
Stewart		13,657	12,321	90.22%	171	1.25%	74	0.54%	76	0.56%	2	0.01%	45	0.33%	632	4.63%	336	2.46%
Sullivan		158,163	143,354	90.64%	3,197	2.02%	350	0.22%	1,270	0.80%	36	0.02%	457	0.29%	5,951	3.76%	3,548	2.24%
Sumner		196,281	155,169	79.05%	15,537	7.92%	476	0.24%	2,932	1.49%	116	0.06%	655	0.33%	8,526	4.34%	12,870	6.56%
Tipton		60,970	44,925	73.68%	10,760	17.65%	180	0.30%	393	0.64%	39	0.06%	190	0.31%	2,797	4.59%	1,686	2.77%
Trousdale		11,615	8,786	75.64%	1,917	16.50%	26	0.22%	27	0.23%	0	0.00%	20	0.17%	464	3.99%	375	3.23%
Unicoi		17,928	16,175	90.22%	44	0.25%	38	0.21%	37	0.21%	0	0.00%	21	0.12%	506	2.82%	1,107	6.17%
Union		19,802	18,642	94.14%	53	0.27%	33	0.17%	36	0.18%	5	0.03%	41	0.21%	588	2.97%	404	2.04%
Van Buren		6,168	5,866	95.10%	20	0.32%	7	0.11%	10	0.16%	1	0.02%	0	0.00%	181	2.93%	83	1.35%
Warren		40,953	33,980	82.97%	1,090	2.66%	84	0.21%	258	0.63%	10	0.02%	138	0.34%	1,450	3.54%	3,943	9.63%
Washington		133,001	112,606	84.67%	5,511	4.14%	289	0.22%	1,980	1.49%	53	0.04%	606	0.46%	5,820	4.38%	6,136	4.61%
Wayne		16,232	14,503	89.35%	878	5.41%	18	0.11%	27	0.17%	1	0.01%	54	0.33%	372	2.29%	379	2.33%
Weakley		32,902	27,813	84.53%	2,593	7.88%	52	0.16%	192	0.58%	3	0.01%	79	0.24%	1,265	3.84%	905	2.75%
White		27,351	24,833	90.79%	405	1.48%	75	0.27%	132	0.48%	10	0.04%	56	0.20%	1,104	4.04%	736	2.69%
Williamson		247,726	200,408	80.90%	9,709	3.92%	393	0.16%	12,879	5.20%	115	0.05%	1,020	0.41%	8,941	3.61%	14,261	5.76%
Wilson		147,737	118,889	80.47%	10,099	6.84%	405	0.27%	3,086	2.09%	44	0.03%	602	0.41%	6,237	4.22%	8,375	5.67%

== Defunct counties ==
There are two defunct counties in Tennessee:

- James County, Tennessee (1870–1919): Now part of Hamilton County. The county seat was Ooltewah.
- Tennessee County, Tennessee (1788–1796): When Tennessee achieved statehood, the previous Tennessee County in North Carolina became Tennessee County, Tennessee, and was divided into Montgomery and Robertson Counties.

== Consolidated counties ==
Three Tennessee counties operate under consolidated city–county governments, a city and county that have been merged into one jurisdiction. As such, these governments are simultaneously a city, which is a municipal corporation, and a county, which is an administrative division of a state.

- City of Nashville and Davidson County
- City of Lynchburg and Moore County
- City of Hartsville and Trousdale County

== See also ==
- List of municipalities in Tennessee
- List of United States counties and county equivalents
