= Bledsoe's Station =

- U.S. National Register of Historic Places
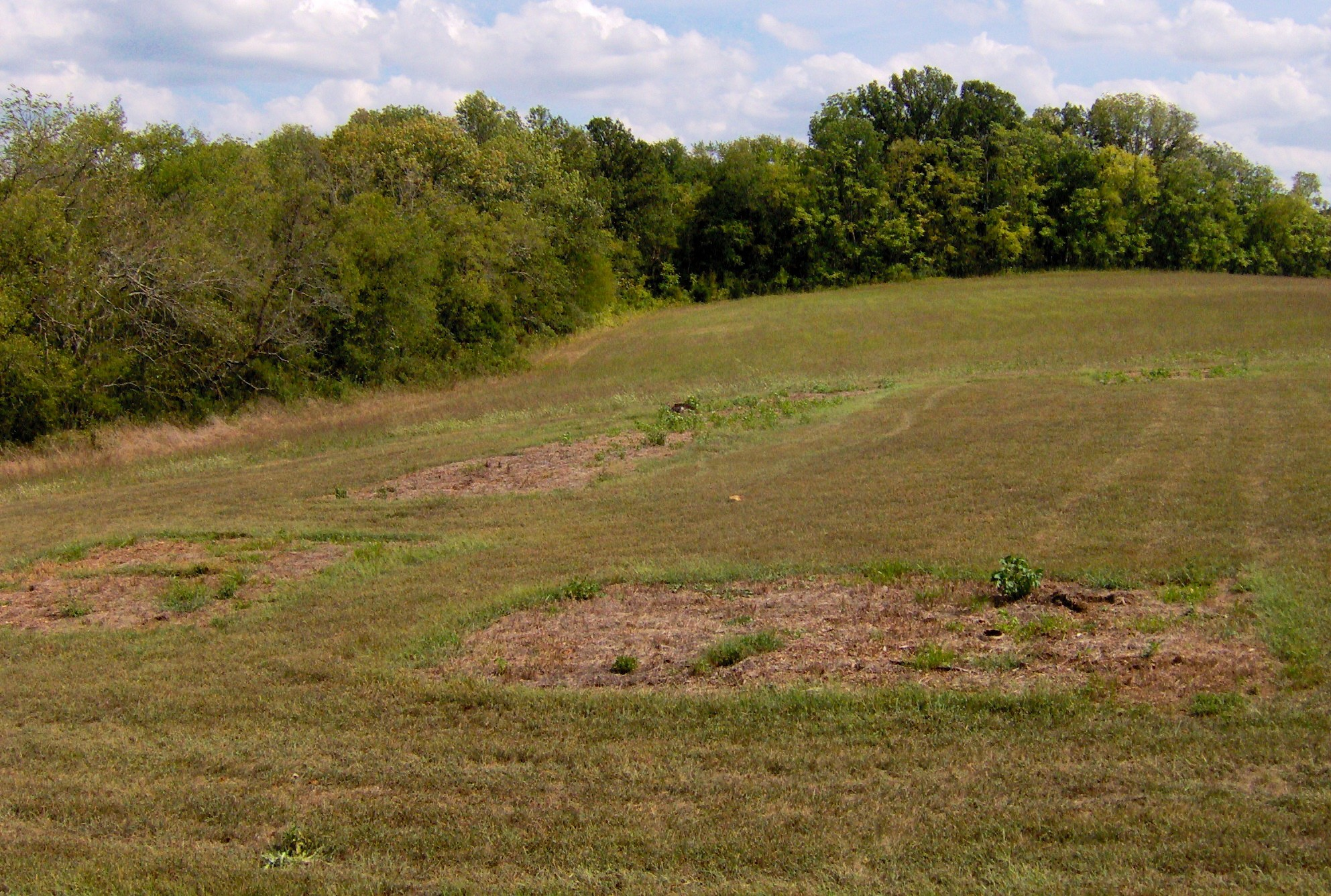
- The site of Bledsoe's Station
- Location: Castalian Springs, Tennessee, US
- Nearest city: Gallatin, Tennessee, US
- Coordinates: 36°23′58″N 86°19′14″W
- Built: c. 1781–1783
- NRHP reference No.: 92000970
- Added to NRHP: July 30, 1992

Bledsoe's Station, also known as Bledsoe's Fort, was an 18th-century fortified frontier settlement located in what is now Castalian Springs, Tennessee. The fort was built by longhunter and Sumner County pioneer Isaac Bledsoe (c. 1735–1793) in the early 1780s to protect Upper Cumberland settlers and migrants from hostile Native American attacks. While the fort is no longer standing, its location has been verified by archaeological excavations. The site is now part of Bledsoe's Fort Historical Park, a public park established in 1989 by Sumner County residents and Bledsoe's descendants.

Bledsoe's Station was one of a series of frontier outposts built in the Upper Cumberland during the first major migration of Euro-American settlers into the Middle Tennessee area following the American Revolution. The fort was a convenient stopover along Avery's Trace—the main road connecting East and Middle Tennessee at the time. The flood of settlers into the region brought inevitable conflict with the region's Native American inhabitants, and dozens of settlers were killed in the late 1780s and early 1790s. Isaac Bledsoe's brother Anthony was killed in an ambush at the fort in 1788, and Isaac was killed while tending a field outside the fort in 1793. The end of the Cherokee–American wars in 1794 ended much of the violence in the region and reduced the fort's necessity.

Bledsoe's Fort Historical Park protects the fort's excavation site, as an outline of the fort's walls can be discerned from former excavation trenches, as well as several historic structures, including the Nathaniel Parker Cabin and Hugh Rogan Cottage, who were compatriots of Isaac Bledsoe and a pioneer cemetery, with a large obelisk, dedicated to the Bledsoe brothers. The Castalian Springs Mound Site and the Wynnewood State Historic Site are located immediately east of the park, and the Cragfont State Historic Site is located immediately to the west.

== Geography ==
Bledsoe's Station was located on a hill slope between Bledsoe Creek to the west and Bledsoe Lick Creek to the east. Both streams empty into the Old Hickory Lake impoundment of the Cumberland River just over a mile to the south. The hill is relatively blunt and consists of open fields alternating with densely forested areas. The top of the hill is used as a flying zone for radio-controlled airplanes. The spring that furnished the minerals for Bledsoe's Lick flows at the base of the hill a few hundred yards east of the fort site.

Bledsoe's Fort Historical Park covers most of the hill between the Sumner County RC Flyers airfield and Rock Springs Road. Tennessee State Route 25, also known as Hartsville Pike, provides the park's southern boundary and main access. The park is roughly halfway between Hartsville to the east and Gallatin to the west and lies approximately 35 miles (56 km) northeast of Nashville.

== History ==
=== Native-American settlements ===
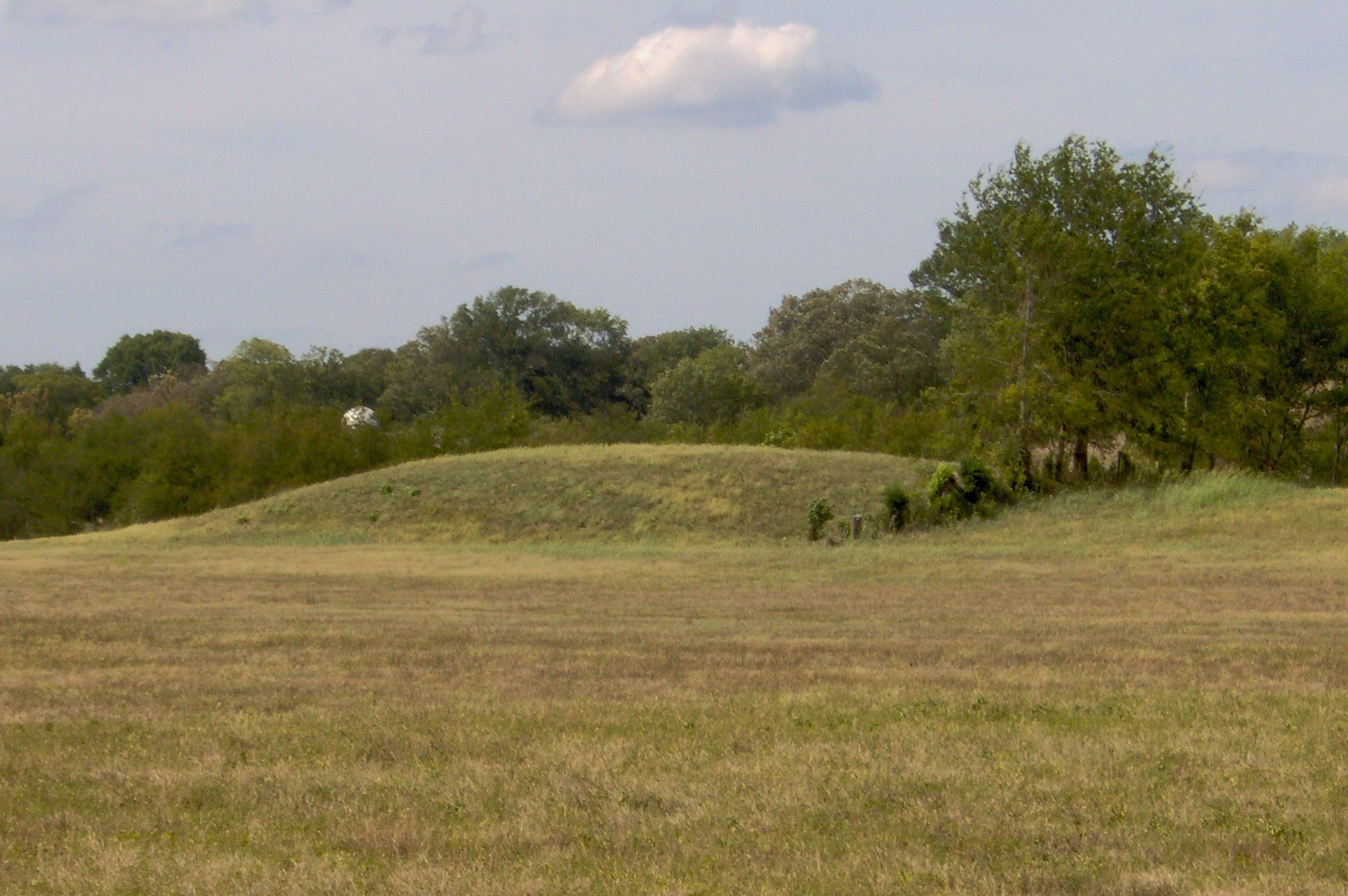
Castalian Springs Mound Site

For thousands of years, the mineral springs at Bledsoe's Lick, as natural mineral licks, attracted buffalo and other large animals and subsequently drew Native American hunters to the area. Native Americans were hunting around Bledsoe's Lick as early as 12,000 years ago during the Paleo-Indian period and camped sporadically in the area throughout the Archaic (8000-1000 BC) and Woodland (1000 BC - 1000 AD) periods. During the Mississippian period (c. 1000–1450 AD), a substantial village had been established at the Castalian Springs Mound Site, a few hundred yards from the mineral springs. The village covered 40 acres (0.16 km^{2}) and contained at least 12 mounds. By the time the first Euro-American explorers arrived in the area in the mid-18th century, the Cherokee, Chickasaw, and Creek claimed the area as a hunting ground.

=== European-American exploration ===
Among the first documented English-American explorers, in the Upper Cumberland region, were the longhunters, so-called because of the long durations of their hunting expeditions. The longhunters typically followed the Cumberland River and its headwaters, from southwestern Virginia into Middle Tennessee. Expeditions led by Henry Skaggs in 1765 and James Smith in 1766 passed through what is now Sumner County, Tennessee, and hunted extensively in the Upper Cumberland region. In 1769, an expedition led by Kasper Mansker spent several months in the Upper Cumberland area, eventually sending two canoes full of furs downriver to Natchez, Mississippi. Mansker returned to the Upper Cumberland in 1771 with a larger group of hunters—among them Isaac Bledsoe—and collected several thousand skins. In 1772, Mansker and Bledsoe led a third expedition to the Upper Cumberland region. This group established a base camp along Station Camp Creek (giving the creek its name) a few miles to the west near Gallatin. It was during this third expedition that Bledsoe followed the ancient buffalo paths to the creek and salt lick that now bear his name, and where he would eventually construct his fort.

In the late 1770s, longhunter and explorer Thomas "Bigfoot" Spencer led a hunting expedition that camped near Bledsoe's Lick. Spencer remained throughout 1778, spending the winter in a hollowed-out sycamore tree just south of the mineral springs. Spencer spent much of the year building cabins in the area, believing (mistakenly) that if he constructed cabins on certain tracts of land, he could lay claim to these tracts.

=== European-American settlement and Indian hostilities ===
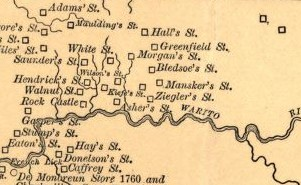
Map of the Upper Cumberland frontier

The Bledsoe brothers, Isaac and Anthony, were born in Virginia in the early 1730s. Anthony Bledsoe, the older of the two, served in the French and Indian War and in various capacities with the Virginia militia. He commanded Fort Patrick Henry at Long Island of the Holston in 1776 and was elected to the Virginia House of Delegates the following year. Isaac Bledsoe also served in the French and Indian War, and following the long hunting excursions of the early 1770s, he joined William Christian's 1776 punitive expedition against the Cherokee. In 1779, North Carolina appointed Anthony Bledsoe to lead a surveying party to Middle Tennessee. Isaac Bledsoe followed in 1781.

Isaac Bledsoe probably began building Bledsoe's Station shortly after his arrival, although he did not move his family into the fort until 1783. Around the time Bledsoe's Station was completed, Anthony completed a fort at Greenfield 2.5 miles (4.0 km) north of Bledsoe's Station. As settlers poured into the Upper Cumberland region, conflict with the region's Native American inhabitants intensified. The Chickamaugas—a renegade branch of the Cherokee—had for the most part been at war with the United States since 1776 and opposed land concessions that would allow Euro-American settlers to move into the Middle Tennessee area permanently.

In 1782, frontiersman Hugh Rogan (1747–1814) was nearly killed in an ambush in the vicinity of what is now Cragfont. A hunting party led by Thomas Spencer was attacked at Drake's Creek in 1784. Spencer survived but was later killed in an ambush near Crab Orchard. In 1786, Anthony Bledsoe wrote a letter to North Carolina governor Richard Caswell reporting that 14 settlers had been killed that year and sought permission to attack the Chickamaugas. A schoolmaster named George Hamilton was shot and badly wounded at Bledsoe's Station in 1787. As attacks increased, Anthony moved his family from Greenfield to Bledsoe's Station, which afforded better protection, but in 1788 he was shot and mortally wounded when he accidentally stepped into a section of the fort vulnerable to hostile fire.

Conflict between the Chickamaugas and the Upper Cumberland settlers continued into the early 1790s. Ziegler's Fort (at what is now Bledsoe Creek State Park a few miles southwest of Bledsoe's Lick) was overrun in 1792, and Morgan's Station (northwest of Bledsoe's Lick) was nearly burned a few months later. In 1793, Isaac Bledsoe was shot and killed while walking through a field near Bledsoe's Station. The following year, a son of Anthony Bledsoe (named Anthony) and a nephew of Anthony and Isaac (also named Anthony) were both ambushed and killed near Rock Castle at what is now Hendersonville. Thomas Bledsoe, another son of Anthony Bledsoe, was ambushed and killed a few months later. Hostilities between the settlers and the Chickamaugas finally subsided when the 1794 Treaty of Tellico brought an end to the Cherokee–American wars.

=== Avery's Trace ===
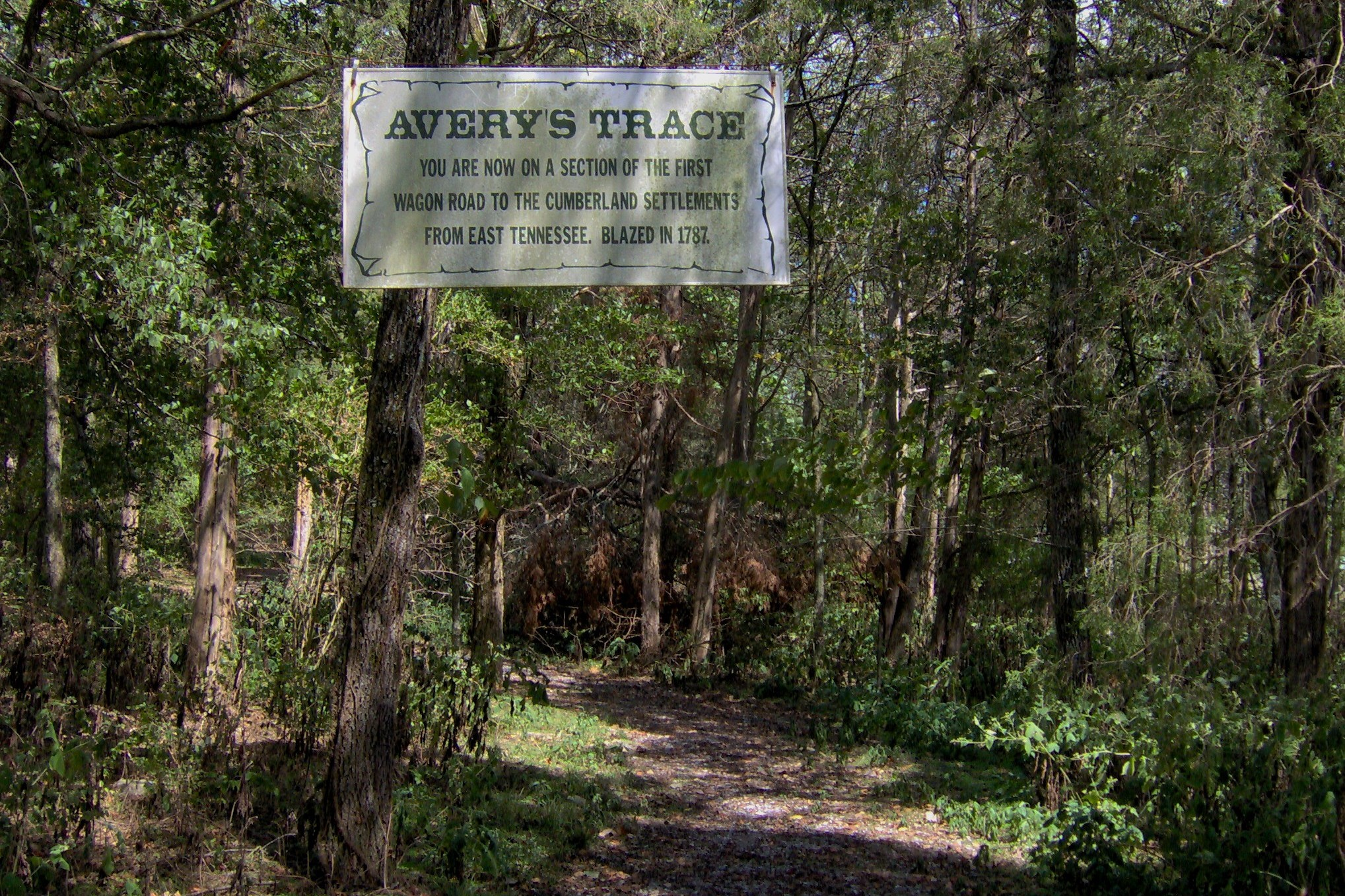
Sign marking what was once a section of Avery's Trace

The first major road connecting the Upper Cumberland region with settlements to the east, known as Avery's Trace, was completed in 1788. The road, which connected Fort Southwest Point with Nashville, passed a few hundred feet east of Bledsoe's Station. Guests at Bledsoe's Station in the 1790s included French botanist André Michaux and Louis-Philippe, Duke of Orléans and later king of France.

General James Winchester, who helped establish Cairo to the southwest and was later instrumental in the founding of Memphis, purchased Bledsoe's Station in 1797. The following year, Winchester completed Cragfont near Bledsoe Creek about a mile to the west. In 1807, a pioneer from North Carolina named Jeremiah Belote purchased Bledsoe's Lick, and his descendants retained possession of the property for several decades.

== Bledsoe's Fort Historical Park ==
Following Winchester's death in 1826, his daughter, Almira Wynne, inherited what is now the Wynnewood State Historical Site. Wynnewood—the largest extant log structure in the state—was completed in 1830 and operated as an inn. During this period, the Winchester family also managed to change the name of Bledsoe's Lick to "Castalian Springs", the name being derived from the spring of mythological importance near Delphi in Greece. Castalian Springs thrived sporadically as a health resort until 1914.

The Bledsoe's Station site was purchased by Sumner County in 1989. Bledsoe's Fort Historical Park consists of approximately 80 acres (0.32 km^{2}), and includes the Bledsoe's Station site and several other features important to the early history of the Upper Cumberland region. The park is owned by Sumner County and maintained by the Bledsoe's Lick Historical Association. A short loop trail—part of which follows a section of Avery's Trace—provides access to the fort site and other features.

=== Historical features ===
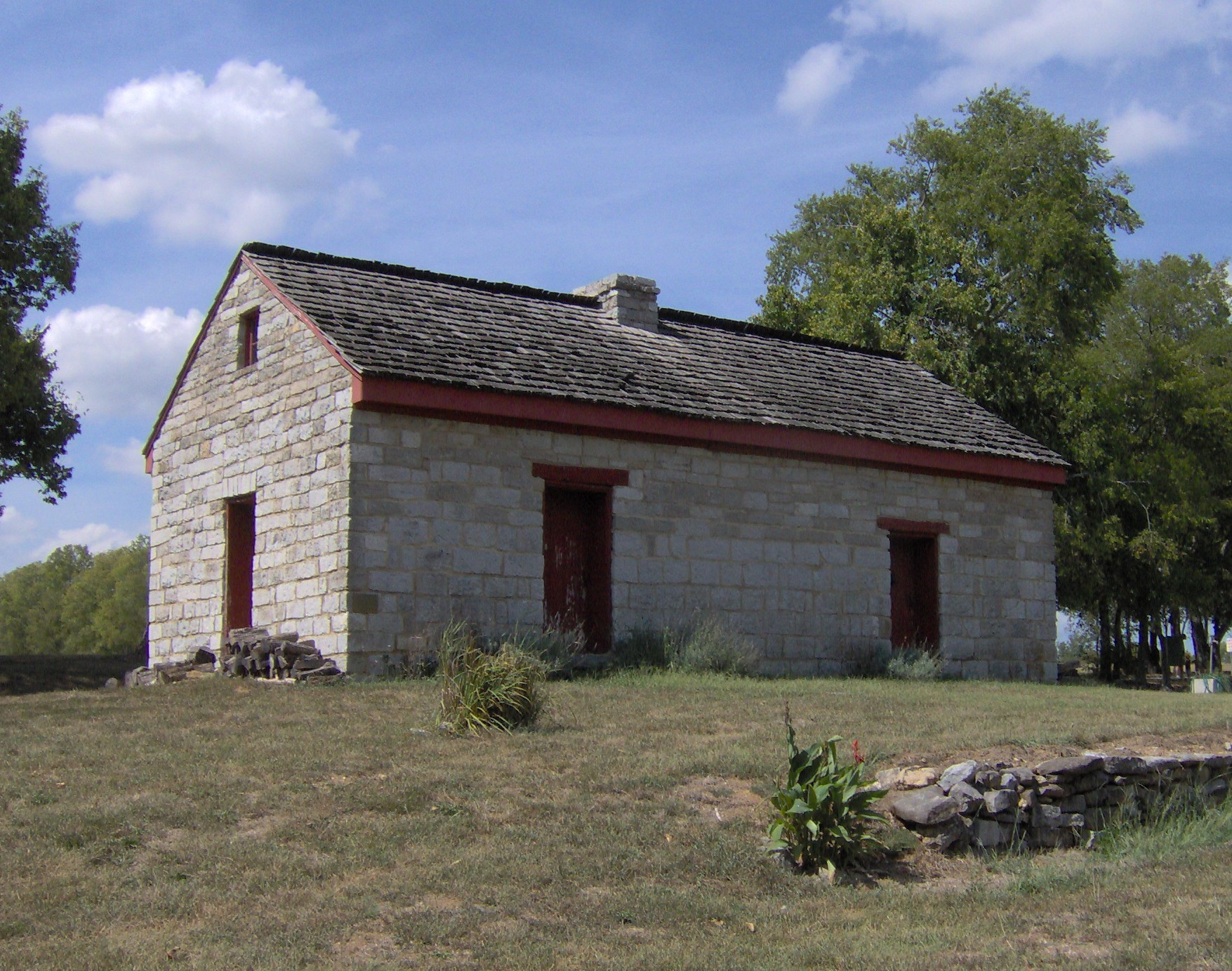
Hugh Rogan Cottage

- Bledsoe's Station site — the site of Bledsoe's Station was excavated by Middle Tennessee State University (MTSU) in the late 1990s. Excavators discovered several root cellars (indicating the presence of log cabins) and the fort's stockade. The excavation trench lines remain, and a small platform overlooks the site.
- Hugh Rogan Cottage — Hugh Rogan's stone cottage was built a few miles north of Bledsoe's Lick around 1800. The cottage's architecture was heavily influenced by folk traditions of Rogan's native Ireland, namely the low gabled roof and corresponding doors and windows. The cottage was dismantled and moved to the park in 1998.
- Nathaniel Parker Cabin — Nathaniel Parker's cabin is a typical pioneer log cabin, built in the 1780s. The cabin was originally located a few miles north of Bledsoe's Lick and later dismantled and moved to the park. Parker married Mary Ramsey Bledsoe—the widow of Anthony Bledsoe—in the 1790s and commanded the fort at Greenfield.
- Belote Cemetery — the Belote Cemetery (also called the "Pioneer Cemetery") is located along a section of Avery's Trace a few hundred yards southeast of the fort site and contains the graves of various early settlers in the Bledsoe's Lick area. The cemetery's most prominent feature is a 15-foot (4.6 m) obelisk erected by the Bledsoe family in 1908 as a monument to Isaac and Anthony Bledsoe.
- Long hunter camp — the long hunter camp is a demonstration area located along a spring near the ancient salt lick. MTSU has constructed a "lean-to" structure believed to be typical of shelters used at 18th-century long hunter base camps.
- Belote springhouse — the ruins of a springhouse used by the Belote family in the 19th century are located along a spring in the Bledsoe's Lick area, near the Long hunter camp.
- The Cavern of the Skulls — a cave is located a few hundred feet east of the fort site. The cave's entrance, which is approximately 5 feet (1.5 m) x 10 feet (3.0 m), is closed to the public. 19th-century cave explorers reported the presence of human skulls in the cave, suggesting that the inhabitants of the Cheskiki Mound village may have used the cave to store "trophy" skulls. A ritual scene depicted on a shell gorget uncovered at the mound site lends some credence to this hypothesis.

== Gallery ==
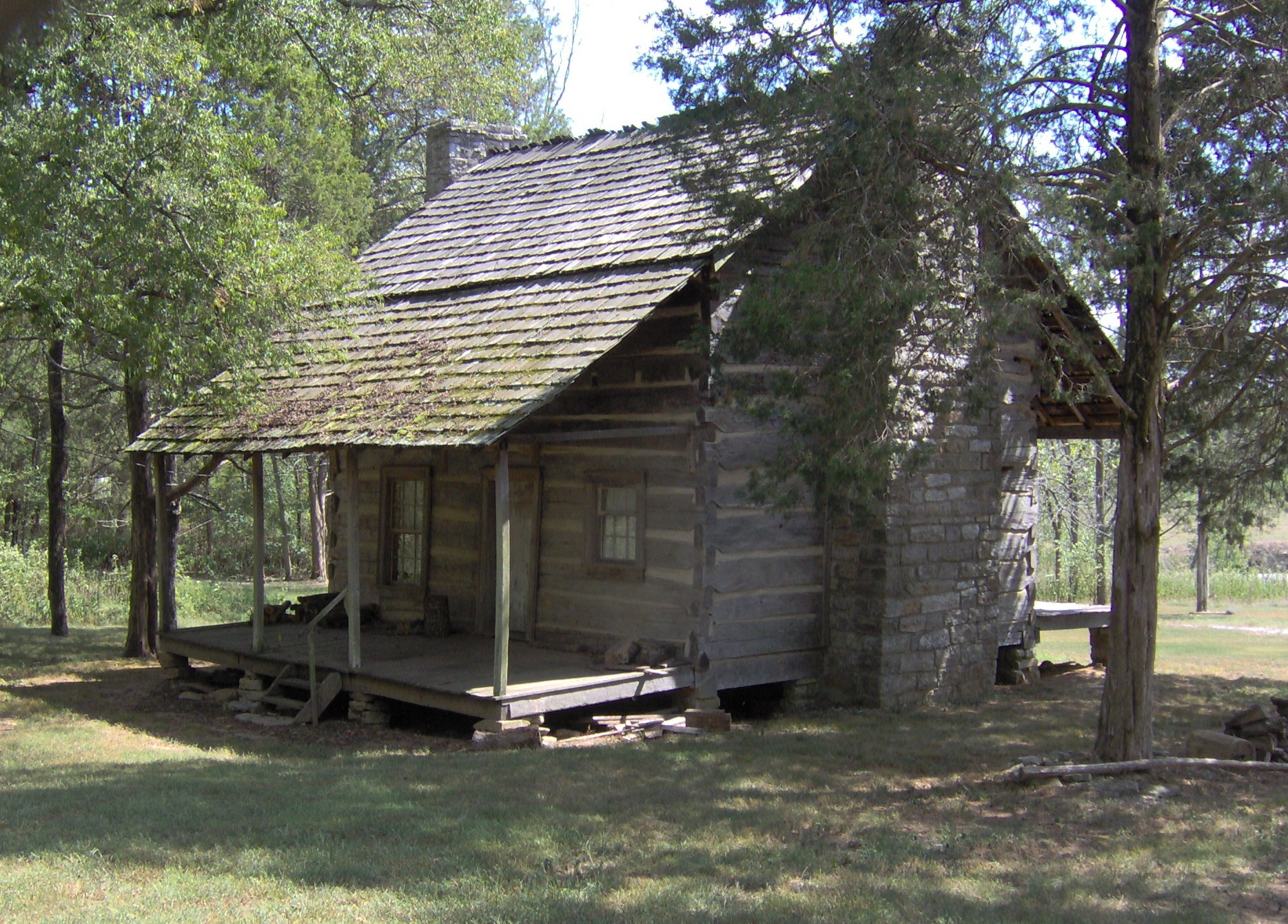
Nathaniel Parker Cabin

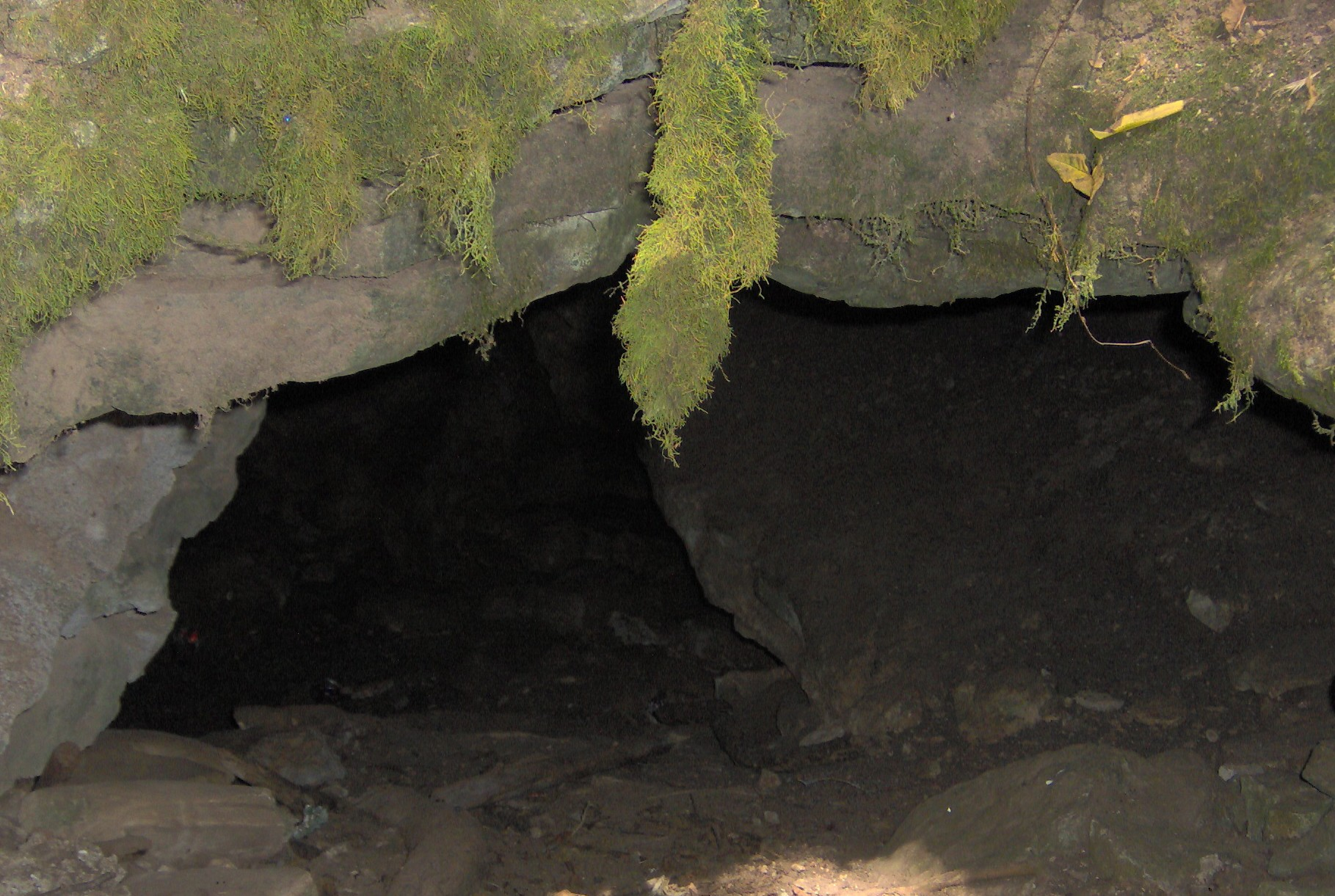
Cavern of the Skulls

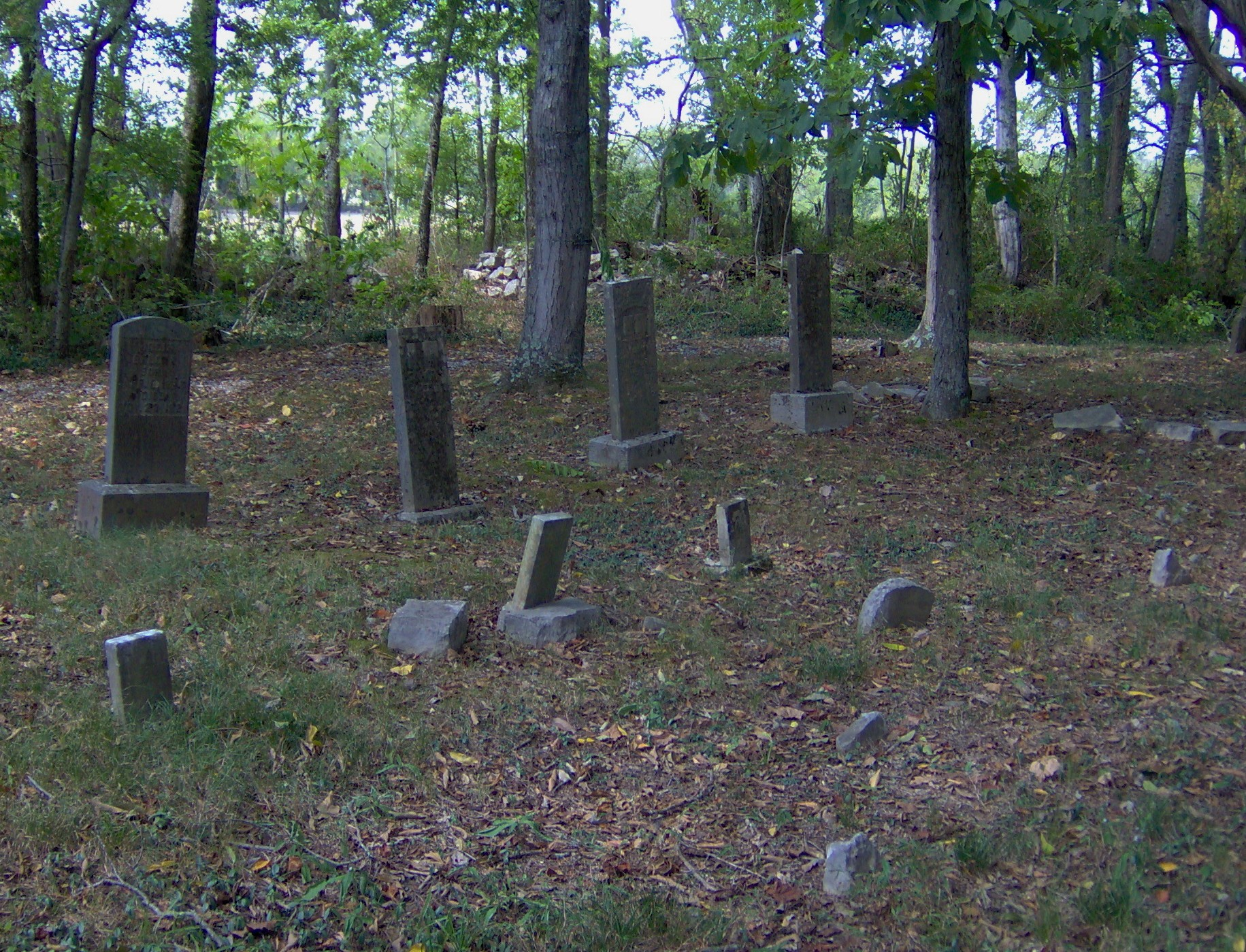
Belote Cemetery

== See also ==
- Fort Blount
- Tellico Blockhouse
