= Nickajack Expedition =

Battle between American frontiersmen and the Chickamauga Cherokee

The Nickajack Expedition in 1794 was a long-running battle fought from late summer to fall between American frontiersmen and the Chickamauga Cherokee. This Cherokee band had resisted the increasing American encroachment into their territory and raided American settlements in the region.

The military expedition was a decisive success for the American settlers of what was then called the Southwest Territory and surrounding regions. It eventually became known to Americans as the "Last Battle of the Cherokee". Other Cherokee defeats followed shortly, and the US forced them to agree to another treaty ceding some of their land. A total of 39 Cherokee chiefs and leaders, including Chickamauga, signed the 1798 Treaty of Tellico, ceding a large territory in East Tennessee to the United States.

== Background ==
Following a 1777 peace treaty between Native Americans and the American settlers of the Overhill settlements west of the Appalachian Mountains during the American War of Independence, followers of the Cherokee chief Dragging Canoe (who opposed the peace), separated from the tribe and relocated to what is today southeastern Tennessee, near the borders with Georgia and the area later known as Alabama.

They were joined by bands of Shawnee and Creek at this new settlement, which had been established along Chickamauga Creek; it became their namesake. During the Revolutionary War, the Chickamauga Cherokee engaged in ongoing raids against American settlers, often with British and Spanish military aid.

Shortly after the conclusion to the war, the Cherokee moved again, this time west of Lookout Mountain, using Nickajack Cave as a stronghold. Violence between them and European Americans continued for decades.

Notwithstanding the December 1791 Treaty of Holston between Territorial Governor William Blount and most Cherokee bands, settlers in the "Cumberland Region" (especially around the Nashville area) still feared for their lives. They had been frequently raided by the Chickamauga and their allies to the south. By 1792, Blount was engaged in continuing peace negotiations with the Chickamauga. In September 1792 when the Nickajack native peoples launched their attack against the Mero District that was foiled at the Battle of Buchanan's Station those negotiations failed, and resulted in two more years of defensive engagements on the part of the American settlers. When the sons of Colonel Anthony Bledsoe (1739-1788) and Major General George Winchester were killed in 1794, however, Blount finally sanctioned military action.

== The expedition ==
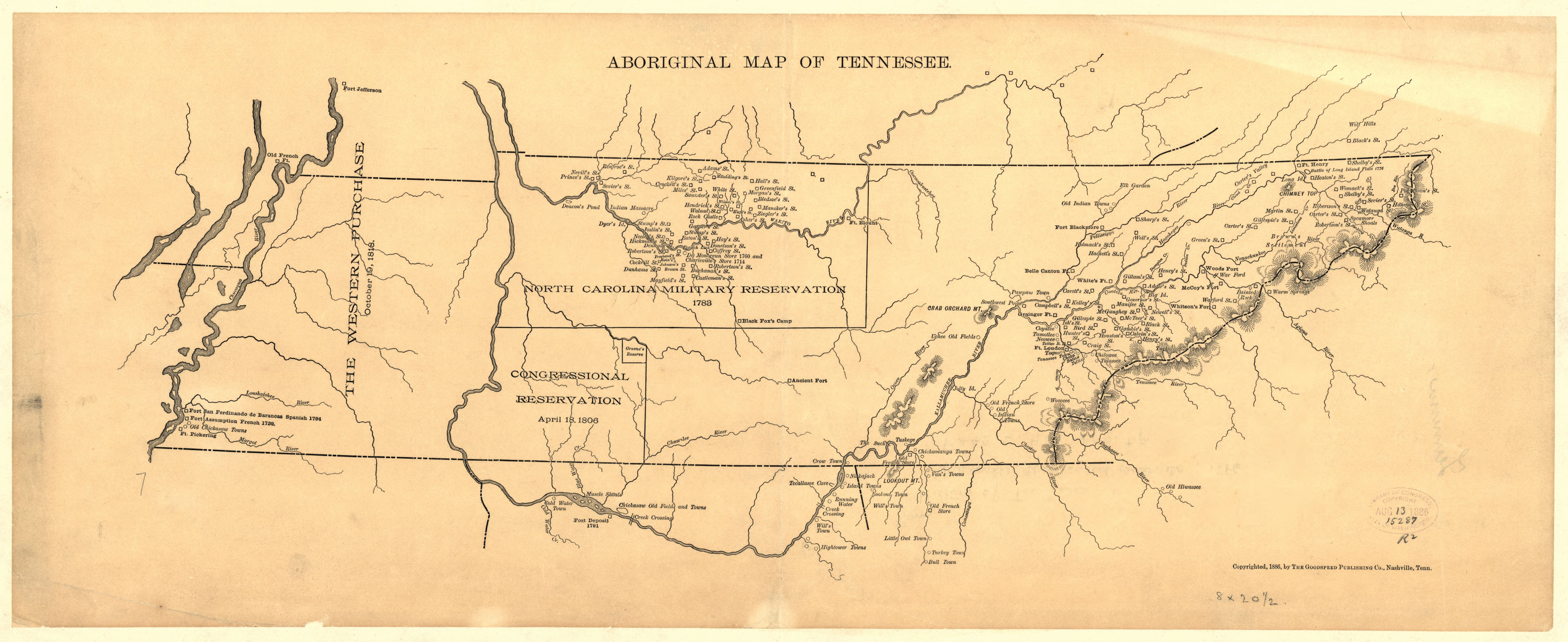
"Aboriginal map of Tennessee" showing the Chickamauga towns (LOC 2006626014)

Governor Blount appointed Major James Ore to head an expedition against the Chickamauga, or "Lower Cherokee" as they had come to be known. Col. John Montgomery commanded the territorial militia, and Col. William Whitley of Kentucky (whose state had also been subject to Cherokee attack from this area ) commanded his 6th Regiment of militia. They singled out two Chickamauga villages, Nickajack Town and Running Water Town, as targets, as these had been the source of many raiding parties. In the mountainous areas, the American force struggled to find the sites and plan attacks.

The expeditions finally reached Nickajack Town in mid-August, but found only a hundred or so warriors present. Many of the villagers had heard of the army's approach and had fled to Running Water Town before Ore's men could reach the village. Warriors from Running Water Town were on their way to Nickajack to investigate the activity and encountered the fleeing villagers. The Nickajack warriors joined with those from Running Water, and together they returned to engage the Americans.

By this time the militias had begun to pursue the fleeing villagers. The soldiers and warriors met at "the Narrows" along the Tennessee River and engaged in battle. It proved to be a disaster for the Chickamauga. They were routed after wounding only three Americans, and killing none. The state militias left 70 dead and destroyed both villages, including food stores.

== Aftermath ==
Coupled with other military victories by the Americans after the Cherokee defeat at Nickajack and Running Water towns, the Cherokee agreed to treaty. A total of 39 Cherokee chiefs and leaders, including those representing the Chickamauga band, finally signed the 1798 Treaty of Tellico, ceding a large amount of land in East Tennessee to the United States.
