= Longhunter =

Frontier hunters in Kentucky and Tennessee

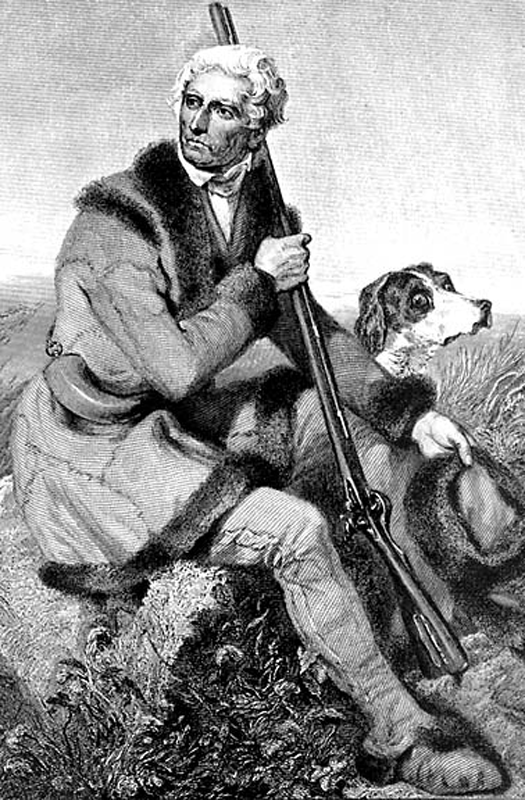
- Daniel Boone, one of the most famous longhunters, on the early American frontier

Occupation
- Names: Longhunter, long hunter

Description
- Competencies: Trapping, hunting, fishing, skinning, marksmanship, self-defense, trading, canoeing, horsemanship, tracking, exploring, mental and physical toughness, wilderness survival skills, folk medicine, frontier doctoring, diplomacy, English, French, Spanish, and Native American languages
- Related jobs: Coureur des bois, Mountain man

Longhunter with dead deer

A longhunter (or long hunter) was an 18th-century explorer and hunter who made expeditions into the American frontier for as much as six months at a time.

While historian Emory Hamilton says that "The Long Hunter was peculiar to Southwest Virginia only...", many also hailed from North Carolina's western piedmont. The term has also been used loosely to describe any unofficial European American explorer of the period. Many long hunts started in the Holston River Valley near Chilhowie, Virginia. Parties of men usually started their hunts in October and ended toward the end of March or early in April, going west into the territory of present-day Kentucky and Tennessee. These were the hunting grounds of the Cherokee and Shawnee people.

The longhunters gathered information about the western lands in the 1760s and early 1770s that would prove critical to early European American settlement in Tennessee and Kentucky. Many longhunters were employed by land surveyors seeking to claim new lands ceded to the British by the French in the Ohio River Valley following France's defeat in the Seven Years' War. Some later helped guide settlers to what became Middle Tennessee and southeastern Kentucky.

== History ==
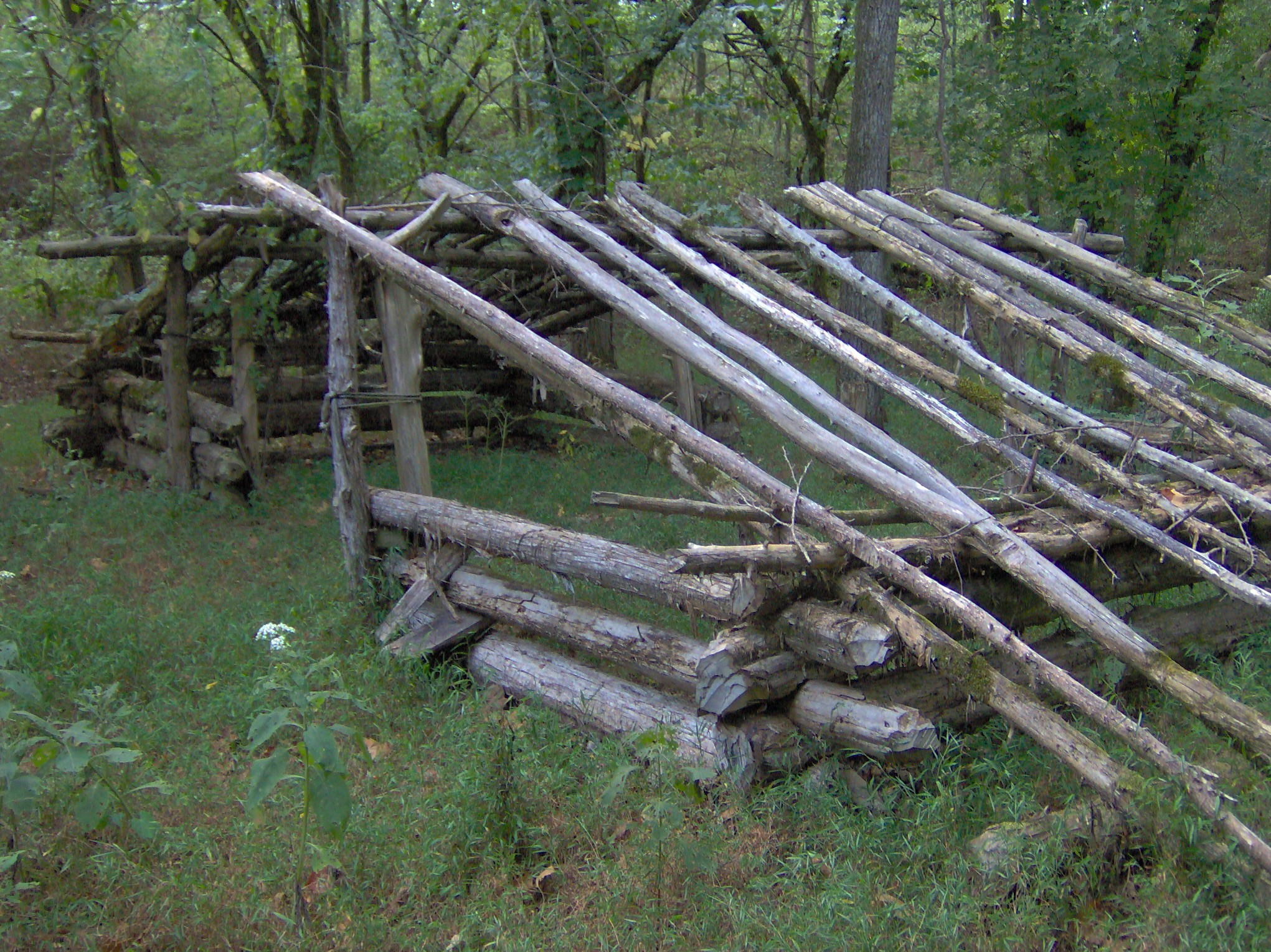
Reconstructed "lean-to" at the longhunter camp demonstration area at Bledsoe's Fort Historic Park in Sumner County, Tennessee

=== Tennessee ===
As colonial settlement approached the eastern base of the Appalachian Mountains in the early 18th century, game in the Piedmont region became more scarce. Merchants returning from trade missions to Overhill Cherokee villages in the Tennessee Valley brought back news of the abundance of game west of the range and began taking hunters along on their trade expeditions. In 1748 and 1750, Thomas Walker crossed the mountains and explored the Holston River valley, recording and widely publicizing the location of Cumberland Gap—a pass near the modern border of Virginia, Kentucky, and Tennessee. This allowed relatively easy access to the headwaters of the Tennessee and Cumberland rivers, by which travelers could enter the territories downriver.

In 1761, Elisha Wallen (spelled variously "Walden", "Wallin", and "Walling") led the first major recorded long hunt into what is now Tennessee. Wallen set up a station camp in Lee County, Virginia, and trekked into the Clinch and Powell valleys in what is now Hawkins County, Tennessee. That same year, Colonel Adam Stephen led regiments of Virginia and North Carolina soldiers to Long Island of the Holston, in what is now Sullivan County, Tennessee. The expedition was to act in conjunction with a combined British and South Carolina force commanded by Lieutenant Colonel James Grant. Grant's force destroyed 18 Cherokee towns, ending the Anglo-Cherokee War before Stephen's campaign could get underway.

With the end of the Seven Years' War in 1763, the French ceded their claims to lands east of the Mississippi River to Great Britain. After the Anglo-Cherokee War, longhunters (some of whom may have been veterans of Stephen's expedition) began crossing the Appalachians into Tennessee and Kentucky in greater numbers. In 1764, Daniel Boone, Richard Callaway and Benjamin Cutbirth explored the upper Holston Valley as agents for Richard Henderson, a land speculator who later played an important role in the early settlement of Tennessee. One of their camps later was used by Boone's friend William Bean, Tennessee's first known permanent Euro-American settler. He built a cabin at the site around 1769.

King George III issued the Royal Proclamation of 1763 prohibiting colonists from encroaching on Native lands. This effectively barred hunting west of the Appalachian range. Both the Cherokee and the British, however, had considerable difficulty enforcing this ban. In 1769, Cherokee Chief Oconastota complained to the British Superintendent of Indian Affairs that the entire Cherokee Nation was "filling with Hunters, and the guns rattling every way on the path." While some longhunters had their pelts confiscated by the Cherokee, and a rare few were even killed, most managed to avoid detection.

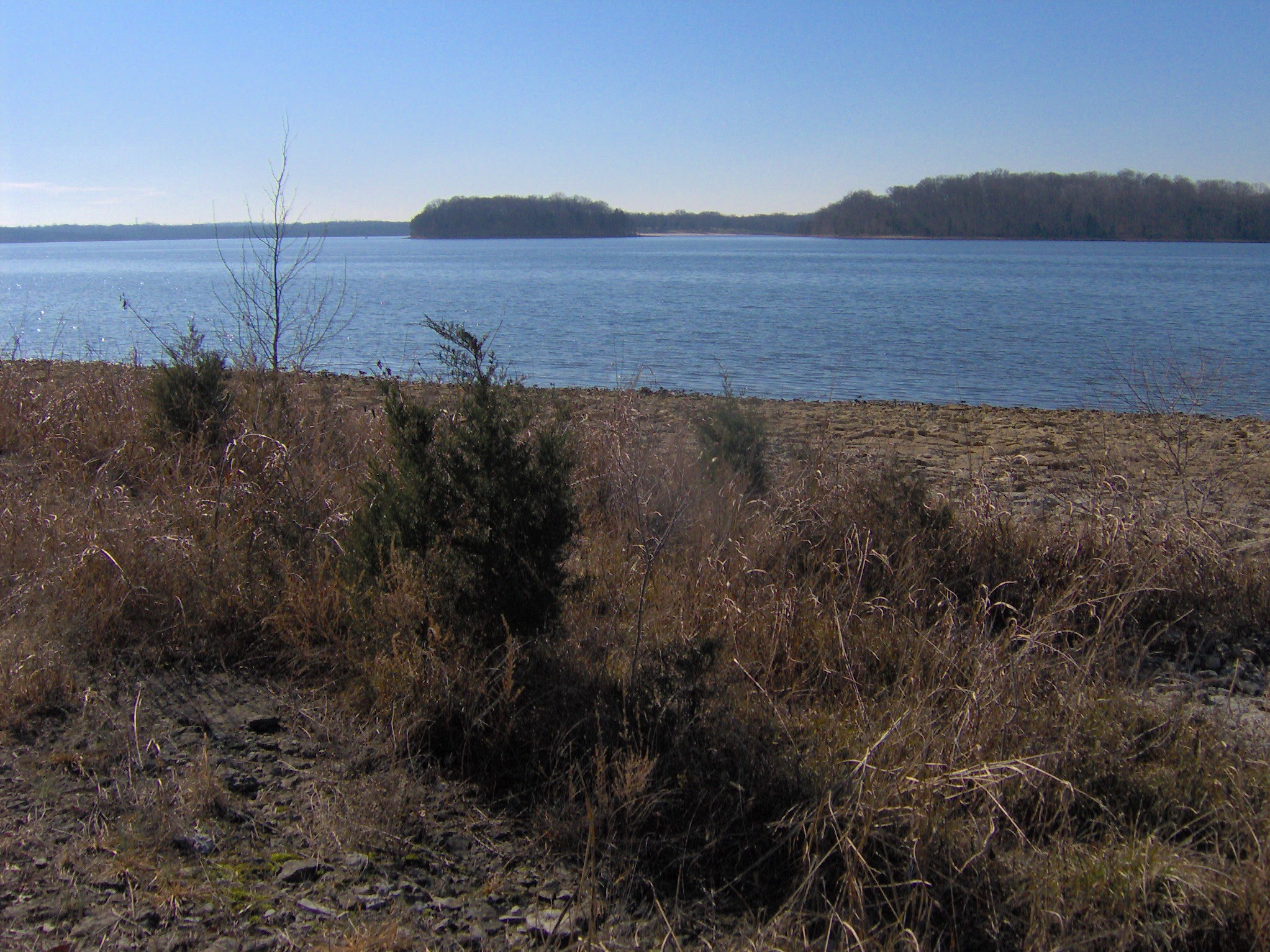
Stones River

In 1766 James Smith led an ambitious long hunt into Middle, West Tennessee, and Kentucky, following the Cumberland River all the way to its mouth on the Ohio River (in present-day, Kentucky). While a member of this expedition, Uriah Stone, was hunting along a tributary of the Cumberland a colonial French hunting companion stole all his furs. The tributary was subsequently named Stones River. Stone returned to the Cumberland valley in 1769, along with fellow hunters Kasper Mansker, Isaac and Abraham Bledsoe, Joseph Drake, and Robert Crockett. Although Crockett was killed that year, the 1766 and 1769 expeditions identified various trails, salt licks, and camping areas that later helped guide the first Anglo-American settlers to the Middle Tennessee area.

==== Legacy ====
Various geographical entities in Tennessee are named for longhunters. Walden Ridge, the eastern escarpment of the Cumberland Plateau in Tennessee, is named for Elisha Wallen, one of the first Anglo-Americans to observe it. A high school and dozens of geographical features in Tennessee have been named for Boone, whose exploits came to symbolize frontier life in Tennessee and Kentucky. Isaac Bledsoe was the namesake of Bledsoe Creek in Sumner County, Tennessee, now the site of Bledsoe Creek State Park. Isaac's brother, Anthony, later became the namesake for Bledsoe County.

In 1780, Mansker built a frontier station in what is now Goodlettsville, just north of Nashville. In 1986, the city of Goodlettsville built a replica of Mansker's Station (it is based on historic examples, as the fort's original layout is unknown). It is now open to the public. In the 1970s, Tennessee established Long Hunter State Park along the J. Percy Priest Lake impoundment of Stones River, in the area where Uriah Stone had his furs stolen more than 200 years earlier.

=== Kentucky ===
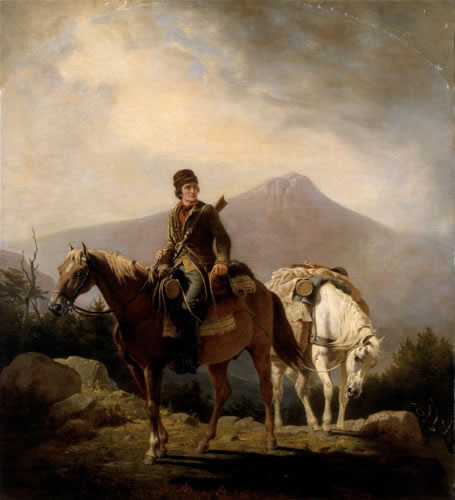
1852 painting of Squire Boone crossing the mountains

The end of King George's War in 1748 left control of the territory between the Appalachian Mountains and the Mississippi River in dispute. The French wanted the region to connect their holdings in Canada with Illinois Country and New Orleans, and the British sought to establish a foothold in the Ohio Valley. French commander Pierre-Joseph Celoron de Blainville conducted maneuvers in 1749 that discouraged British trade west of the Appalachians, although American colonial land speculators remained interested in the region. Walker's 1750 expedition briefly explored what is now southeastern Kentucky, and explorer Christopher Gist managed to reach the mouth of the Kentucky River in 1751.

In the opening years of the French and Indian War, the French gained control of the Ohio Valley with the defeat of George Washington at Fort Necessity in 1754. With the fall of Fort Duquesne and the construction of Fort Pitt in 1758, however, the French were forced to evacuate the region. The French departure and a relative state of peace with the Cherokee during the same period opened up the region to explorers and hunters from the Thirteen Colonies.

John and Samuel Pringle, two deserters from Fort Pitt, spent much of the early 1760s hunting in the Tygart Valley and likely ranged into what is now Kentucky. Part of Elisha Walden's 1761 party hunted along the Rockcastle River from their station camp in southwestern Virginia. In 1767, an expedition led by James Harrod and Michael Holsteiner (Michael Stoner) crossed Kentucky from north to south, reaching the Nashville area several weeks after departing from the Illinois Country. Around the same time, an expedition led by Benjamin Cutbirth crossed Cumberland Gap and pushed all the way to the Mississippi River, where they shipped the pelts they had collected down to New Orleans.

In 1768, John Finley passed through the Yadkin Valley and visited Daniel Boone, with whom he had served in the French and Indian War. Finley told Boone of the natural splendor of Kentucky's Bluegrass region, which he had visited as a merchant before the French and Indian War. The following year, the two led an expedition into Kentucky, traveling up the Rockcastle River and establishing a station camp at Red Lick Fork. While Boone and his companion John Stuart were hunting along the Kentucky River, they were captured by the Shawnee, and their pelts were confiscated. They returned to their station camp to find it plundered and learned that Finley and the rest of the expedition had returned to North Carolina. Undeterred, Boone and Stuart continued hunting in the region. Boone was later joined by his brother, Squire, and the Boone brothers remained in the Kentucky wilderness until 1771. Although they again had their pelts confiscated when they were intercepted by the Cherokee at Cumberland Gap, the Boones were nevertheless eager to return to settle in the region. Daniel Boone's vivid accounts of his hunting exploits helped draw a flood of settlers to Kentucky in subsequent years.

==== Legacy ====
Numerous natural and political entities in Kentucky bear the names of longhunters, including Boone County and Boonesborough, named for Daniel Boone, and Harrodsburg, named for James Harrod. Kenton County is named for Simon Kenton, who, believing he was a fugitive, spent the mid-1770s hunting in eastern Kentucky. Longhunter James Knox named the Dix River after Cherokee leader Captain Dick, who gave Knox permission to hunt along the river in 1770. The U.S. government established Daniel Boone National Forest in 1937 in the eastern part of the state.

== Notable people ==
- Isaac Bledsoe
- Daniel Boone
- Squire Boone
- Richard Callaway
- Samuel Dale
- John Duff
- James Harrod
- Simon Kenton
- Kasper Mansker
- Henry Skaggs
- John 'Jack' Blevins
- William Blevins
- James Smith
- Elisha Wallen (Walden)
- Edward Worthington
