= Cragfont =

Historic house in Tennessee, United States

- U.S. National Register of Historic Places
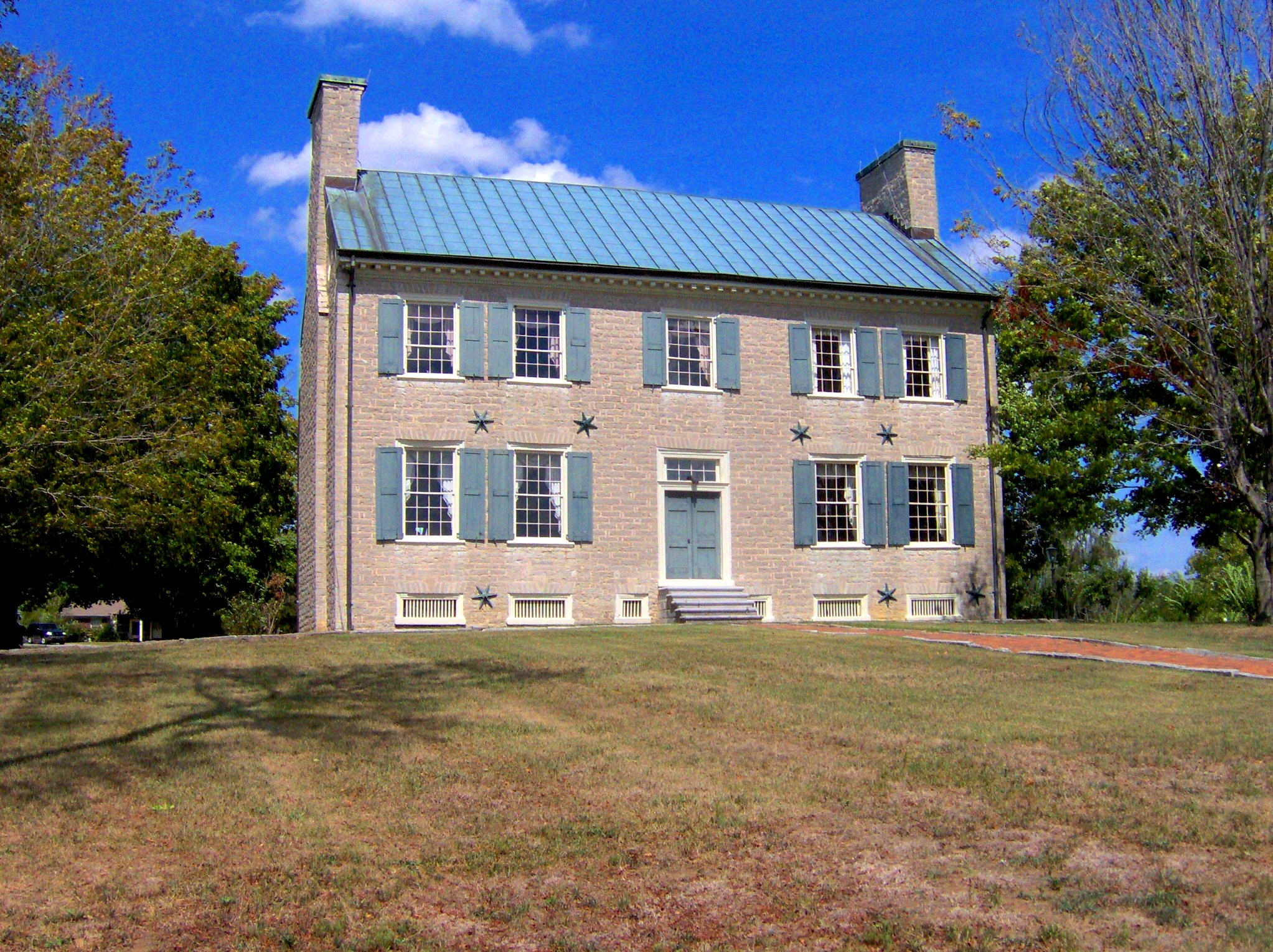

- Location within Tennessee Location within the United States
- Location: 200 Cragfont Road, Castalian Springs, Tennessee 37031 (East of Gallatin off TN 25)
- Nearest city: Gallatin, Tennessee
- Coordinates: 36.4046°N 86.3422°W
- Built: 1802
- Architectural style: Georgian
- NRHP reference No.: 70000618
- Added to NRHP: February 26, 1970

Cragfont (or Cragfont State Historic Site) is a state historic site and historic house located in Castalian Springs, Sumner County, Tennessee. It was the home of Revolutionary War protagonist and Middle Tennessee pioneer General James Winchester.

== History ==
Construction was started in 1798 and completed in 1802 by artisans from James's home state of Maryland. During the time, Cragfont was the finest mansion on the Tennessee frontier and typified the grandeur and style of the best architecture of the late Georgian period. Named Cragfont because it stood on a rocky bluff with a spring at its base, the house is furnished with Federal antiques, some of which are original to the Winchester family. The basement of the house features an authentic weaving room.

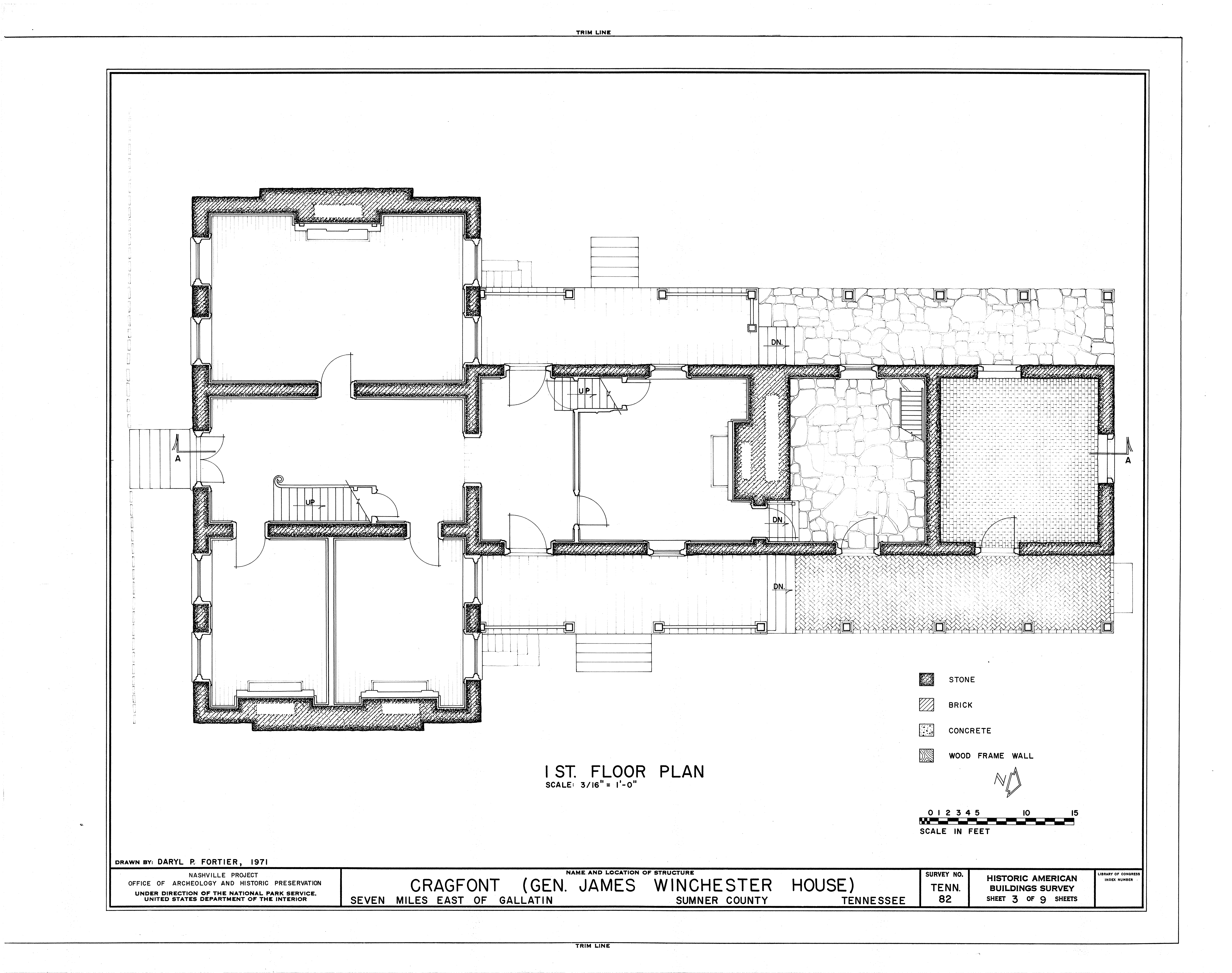
First floor floorplan of Cragfont, Highway 25, Gallatin, Sumner County, TN

Cragfont is listed with the National Register of Historic Places and is open to the public. It is owned by the State of Tennessee and administered in partnership with the Tennessee Historical Commission by the non-profit group Historic Castalian Springs.

== James Winchester ==
Winchester served as a brigadier general in the War of 1812 and a soldier against indigenous Native Americans. He is also credited with founding the city of Memphis, Tennessee along with Andrew Jackson and Judge John Overton. Winchester, who died at the home in 1826, is buried in the family plot behind the house.

== In popular culture ==
=== Television ===
Cragfont was featured as a haunted location on Haunted Live on 2018 on the Travel Channel, where the paranormal team Tennessee Wraith Chasers were the first ever to investigate the house.
