= Anthony Bledsoe =

American surveyor, politician and military colonel

- Born: 1733; Culpeper County, Virginia
- Died: July 20, 1788 (aged 54–55); Castalian Springs, Sumner County, Tennessee
- Occupations: Surveyor; Politician; Military officer
- Title: Colonel
- Spouse: Mary Ramsey Bledsoe
- Children: 10
- Relatives: Isaac Bledsoe (brother); Jacob Bledsoe, Sr. (brother)

Anthony Bledsoe (1733–July 20, 1788) was an American surveyor, politician and military colonel. He served in the French and Indian War and the American Revolutionary War.

== Biography ==
=== Early life ===
Anthony Bledsoe was born in 1733 in Culpeper County, Virginia (or Spotsylvania County, Virginia). His father was Abraham Bledsoe. His brothers included Isaac Bledsoe (1735–1793) and Jacob Bledsoe Sr. (1724–1817).

=== Career ===
He served in the French and Indian War of 1754–1763 in the Virginia militia.

After the war, he served as a justice of the peace for Augusta County in 1769, Botetourt County in 1770 and 1771, and Fincastle County in 1773 and 1774. He also served on the Fincastle Committee of Safety from 1775 to 1776. In 1776, he commanded Fort Patrick Henry on Long Island of the Holston in Tennessee. The following year, in 1777, he was elected to the Virginia House of Delegates.

In 1779, he became a surveyor of the Western parts of Virginia and North Carolina to establish borders for further explorations to come. The following year, in 1780, he became a justice of the peace for the newly created county of Sullivan County, North Carolina; in 1781 and 1782, he served as its state Senator. In 1783, he was one of the surveyors of the North Carolina military land grant reservation. The same year, in 1783, he became a justice of the peace for new Davidson County, Tennessee, then part of North Carolina and named after North Carolina General William Lee Davidson (1746–1781). During the American Revolutionary War of 1775–1783, he served as a Colonel over the Davidson County Regiment of the North Carolina militia. Units that he served in During the American Revolution include:

- Major in a Virginia unit (1776)
- Major in the Washington County Regiment of Militia (1777–1779)
- Major in the Sullivan County Regiment of the North Carolina militia (1779–1781)
- Lt. Colonel in the Sullivan County Regiment of Militia (1781–1783)
- Colonel over the Davidson County Regiment of Militia (1783)

Shortly after the war, 1785 to 1786, he served as a state Senator for Davidson County. He also became an early settler of Sumner County, Tennessee, building what came to be known as Bledsoe's Station in Castalian Springs, Tennessee. By 1787, he served as the Chairman of the Sumner County court. He also served as a surveyor of the area, trying to keep Indians at bay.

=== Personal life ===
He married Mary Ramsey Bledsoe (1734–1808) of Augusta County, Virginia, in the 1760s. They had five sons and six daughters:

- Abraham Bledsoe
- Thomas Bledsoe
- Sarah Bledsoe
- Anthony Bledsoe Jr.
- Isaac Bledsoe
- Henry Ramsey Bledsoe
- Rachael Bledsoe
- Polly Bledsoe
- Prudence Bledsoe
- Susan Bledsoe

=== Death ===
He was killed by Native Americans on July 20, 1788, in Castalian Springs, Tennessee.

== Legacy ==
- Bledsoe County, Tennessee, was named in his honor when it was created in 1807 with land from Roane County and land formerly owned by Native Americans.
- A chapter of the Sons of the American Revolution located in Sumner County, Tennessee, is named in his honor.
