= National Register of Historic Places listings in Sumner County, Tennessee =

Location of Sumner County in Tennessee

This is a list of the National Register of Historic Places listings in Sumner County, Tennessee.

This is intended to be a complete list of the properties and districts on the National Register of Historic Places in Sumner County, Tennessee, United States. Latitude and longitude coordinates are provided for many National Register properties and districts; these locations may be seen together in a map.

There are 38 properties and districts listed on the National Register in the county, including 1 National Historic Landmark. Another 3 properties were once listed but have been removed.

See also National Register of Historic Places listings in Davidson County, Tennessee for additional properties in Goodlettsville, a city that spans the county line.

Contents: Counties in Tennessee
Anderson – Bedford – Benton – Bledsoe – Blount – Bradley – Campbell – Cannon – Carroll – Carter – Cheatham – Chester – Claiborne – Clay – Cocke – Coffee – Crockett – Cumberland – Davidson – Decatur – DeKalb – Dickson – Dyer – Fayette – Fentress – Franklin – Gibson – Giles – Grainger – Greene – Grundy – Hamblen – Hamilton – Hancock – Hardeman – Hardin – Hawkins – Haywood – Henderson – Henry – Hickman – Houston – Humphreys – Jackson – Jefferson – Johnson – Knox – Lake – Lauderdale – Lawrence – Lewis – Lincoln – Loudon – Macon – Madison – Marion – Marshall – Maury – McMinn – McNairy – Meigs – Monroe – Montgomery – Moore – Morgan – Obion – Overton – Perry – Pickett – Polk – Putnam – Rhea – Roane – Robertson – Rutherford – Scott – Sequatchie – Sevier – Shelby – Smith – Stewart – Sullivan – Sumner – Tipton – Trousdale – Unicoi – Union – Van Buren – Warren – Washington – Wayne – Weakley – White – Williamson – Wilson

This National Park Service list is complete through NPS recent listings posted May 1, 2026.

== Current listings ==
	Name on the Register	Image	Date listed	Location	City or town	Description
1	Ashcrest Farm	Ashcrest Farm	April 14, 1992 (#92000349)	410 Gallatin Rd. 36°19′12″N 86°35′29″W	Hendersonville	
2	Bledsoe's Station	Bledsoe's Station	July 30, 1992 (#92000970)	Off State Route 25 west of Castalian Springs; 36°23′58″N 86°19′14″W	Castalian Springs	
3	Bowen-Campbell House	Bowen-Campbell House	July 25, 1977 (#77001295)	705 Caldwell Drive; 36°19′19″N 86°41′22″W	Goodlettsville	
4	Bridal House	Bridal House	February 4, 1982 (#82004059)	Red River Rd. 36°27′04″N 86°32′18″W	Cottontown	
5	Brown-Chenault House	Brown-Chenault House	July 25, 1985 (#85001614)	Chenault Lane; 36°25′33″N 86°18′10″W	Castalian Springs	
6	Cairo Rosenwald School	Cairo Rosenwald School	November 15, 1996 (#96001359)	Zieglers Fort Rd., approximately 2.5 miles (4.0 km) south of State Route 25; 36°21′48″N 86°21′49″W	Cairo	
7	Castalian Springs	Castalian Springs	July 14, 1971 (#71000838)	Gallatin-Hartsville Pike, State Route 25; 36°23′39″N 86°18′59″W	Castalian Springs	
8	Cragfont	Cragfont	February 26, 1970 (#70000618)	East of Gallatin off State Route 25; 36°24′11″N 86°20′27″W	Castalian Springs	
9	Daniel Smith Donelson House	Daniel Smith Donelson House	January 4, 1983 (#83003071)	178 Berrywood Dr. 36°17′51″N 86°35′44″W	Hendersonville	
10	Douglass-Clark House	Douglass-Clark House	March 21, 2011 (#11000098)	Long Hollow Pike at Lower Station Camp Creek Rd. 36°22′57″N 86°33′30″W	Gallatin vicinity	
11	Durham's Chapel School	Durham's Chapel School	November 8, 2006 (#06000652)	5055 Old State Route 31E; 36°28′26″N 86°19′50″W	Bethpage	
12	Leonard B. Fite House	Leonard B. Fite House	March 25, 1982 (#82004061)	1154 W. Main St. 36°18′38″N 86°39′43″W	Hendersonville	
13	Gallatin Commercial Historic District	Gallatin Commercial Historic District	October 23, 1985 (#85003369)	Roughly bounded by Town Creek, N. Water Ave., and Boyer and College Sts., E. Main St, S. Water Ave., and Trimble St. 36°23′21″N 86°26′40″W	Gallatin	
14	Gallatin Presbyterian Church	Gallatin Presbyterian Church	March 25, 1982 (#82004060)	167 W. Main St. 36°23′14″N 86°26′55″W	Gallatin	
15	Greenfield		November 7, 1990 (#90001579)	683 Rock Springs Rd. 36°26′02″N 86°19′00″W	Castalian Springs	
16	Hawthorne Hill	Hawthorne Hill	June 14, 2013 (#13000401)	470 Old Hwy 25; 36°23′27″N 86°17′55″W	Castalian Springs	
17	Hazel Path	Hazel Path	April 5, 1984 (#84003713)	175 E. Main St. 36°18′20″N 86°36′25″W	Hendersonville	
18	James B. Jameson House	James B. Jameson House	November 25, 1985 (#85002968)	2458 Hartsville Pike; 36°23′57″N 86°20′59″W	Gallatin vicinity	
19	King Homestead	King Homestead	January 30, 1978 (#78002640)	West of Cottontown off State Route 25; 36°27′06″N 86°34′14″W	Cottontown vicinity	
20	Locust Grove		January 8, 1979 (#79002484)	North of Castalian Springs; 36°25′30″N 86°18′24″W	Castalian Springs	
21	Maple Cottage		March 15, 2000 (#00000229)	1335 Long Hollow Pike; 36°23′05″N 86°30′34″W	Gallatin	
22	Maple Shade		April 22, 2003 (#03000303)	1755 State Route 31E; 36°25′24″N 86°23′47″W	Gallatin vicinity	
23	Moye Boarding House	Moye Boarding House	March 27, 2013 (#13000124)	Northeast corner of Wheeler & N. Russell Sts. 36°34′55″N 86°30′54″W	Portland	
24	Oakland	Oakland	October 2, 1992 (#92000841)	1995 Hartsville Pike; 36°23′55″N 86°22′08″W	Gallatin vicinity	
25	Oakley	Oakley	July 25, 1985 (#85001615)	2243 Nashville Pike; 36°21′09″N 86°30′27″W	Gallatin	
26	Parker's Chapel Missionary Baptist Church and Cemetery		October 29, 2021 (#100007121)	387 Airport Rd. 36°35′09″N 86°28′49″W	Portland	
27	Parker-Bryson Historic District		June 25, 1987 (#87001036)	Greenfield Lane; 36°25′54″N 86°19′51″W	Castalian Springs	
28	Rascoe-Harris Farm		July 19, 1996 (#96000772)	1135 Liberty Ln. 36°24′24″N 86°30′42″W	Gallatin vicinity	
29	Rock Castle	Rock Castle	July 8, 1970 (#70000619)	139 Rock Castle Lane; 36°16′45″N 86°35′47″W	Hendersonville	
30	Rosemont	Rosemont	April 26, 1978 (#78002641)	810 S. Water St. 36°22′35″N 86°26′33″W	Gallatin	
31	Scattersville Public School	Scattersville Public School	February 7, 2024 (#100009970)	227 Scattersville Road; 36°35′36″N 86°34′05″W	Portland	
32	Shackle Island Historic District	Shackle Island Historic District	January 30, 1978 (#78002643)	North of Hendersonville at Shackle Island Rd. and Long Hollow Pike; 36°22′14″N 86°37′03″W	Hendersonville vicinity	
33	Trousdale-Baskerville House	Trousdale-Baskerville House	July 30, 2009 (#09000577)	211 W. Smith St. 36°23′11″N 86°26′57″W	Gallatin	
34	Trousdale Place	Trousdale Place	June 5, 1975 (#75001793)	183 W. Main St. 36°23′14″N 86°26′56″W	Gallatin	
35	Wall Spring	Wall Spring	April 8, 1994 (#94000334)	931 Red River Rd. 36°23′40″N 86°28′11″W	Gallatin	
36	Walnut Grove	Walnut Grove	December 29, 1978 (#78002642)	911 Laura St. 36°23′30″N 86°28′18″W	Gallatin	
37	Westmoreland Tunnel	Westmoreland Tunnel	January 20, 1978 (#78002644)	Off State Route 52; 36°33′23″N 86°15′03″W	Westmoreland	
38	Williamson and Adams Carriage Factory	Williamson and Adams Carriage Factory	May 12, 1987 (#87000488)	326 E. Main St. 36°23′22″N 86°26′33″W	Gallatin	

== Former listings ==
	Name on the Register	Image	Date listed	Date removed	Location	City or town	Description
1	Mary Felice Ferrell House	Mary Felice Ferrell House	April 14, 1992 (#92000348)	November 4, 2024	2144 Nashville Pike; 36°20′28″N 86°32′06″W	Gallatin	House partially burned in August 2021 which led to the eventual demolition in June 2023.
2	Fairvue	Fairvue	June 10, 1975 (#75002162)	April 4, 2005	4 mi. S of Gallatin on U.S. 31E (Rozella Way below Plantation Blvd); 36°20′41″N 86°29′36″W	Gallatin vicinity	Formerly a National Historic Landmark (note: home still exists, but it was delisted after residential development on plantation grounds)
3	Talley-Beals House		August 22, 1977 (#77001296)	June 5, 1990	N of Hendersonville off Saunderville Rd.	Hendersonville vicinity	House burned to the ground due to lightning strike on May 28, 1990.

== See also ==
- List of National Historic Landmarks in Tennessee
- National Register of Historic Places listings in Tennessee
