= Attorney General Head =

Attorney General Head may refer to:

- Douglas M. Head (1930–2011), Attorney General of Minnesota
- John W. Head (1822–1874), Attorney General of Tennessee
