= James B. Jameson House =

Historic house in Tennessee, United States

- U.S. National Register of Historic Places
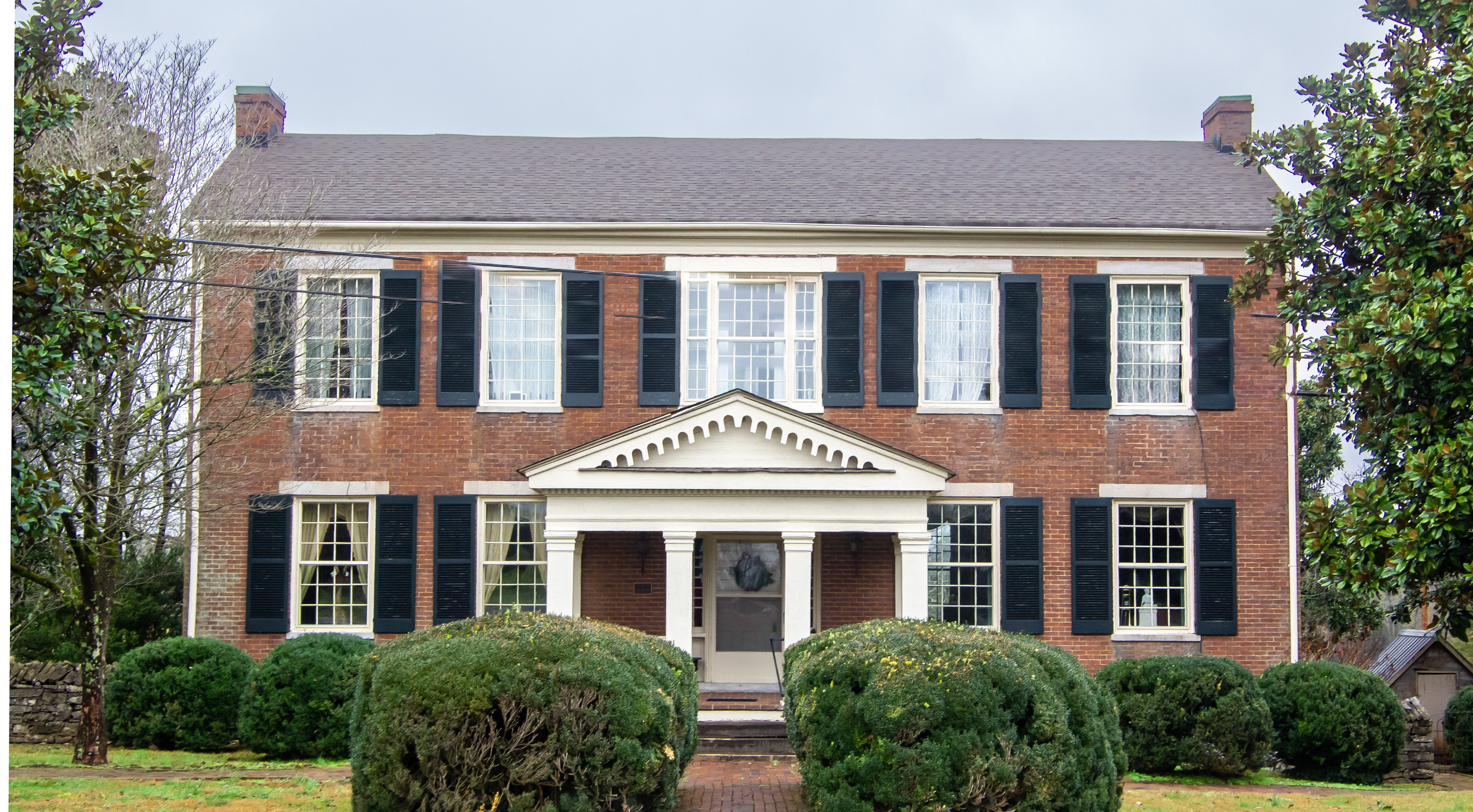

- Location within Tennessee Location within the United States
- Nearest city: Gallatin, Tennessee
- Coordinates: 36°23′57″N 86°20′59″W
- Area: 6.5 acres (2.6 ha)
- Built: 1844
- Architectural style: Greek Revival, Federal
- NRHP reference No.: 85002968
- Added to NRHP: November 25, 1985

The James B. Jameson House, also known as the Jameson-Harsh House, is a historic house in Sumner County, Tennessee near Gallatin.

The house was built circa 1844 by John Fontville, who also built Oakland in Gallatin and Greenfield in Castalian Springs. The original owner, James B. Jameson, was a plantation owner who owned 19 slaves in 1860. It was later owned by his granddaughter Eliza, who lived here with her husband, physician Edward Carr. The house remained in the Jameson family until 1920.

The house was designed in the Federal architectural style, with a Greek Revival portico. It has been listed on the National Register of Historic Places since November 25, 1985.
