= Haunted Live =

American television series

- Genre: Paranormal; Reality TV
- Presented by: Jesse Blaze Snider; Jamie Kaler
- Country of origin: United States
- Original language: English
- No. of seasons: 1
- No. of episodes: 10

Production
- Executive producers: Colleen Needles Steward; Shannon Keenan Demers; Rob Hammersley; T.C. Conway; Eddie Delbridge
- Editor: Marcus Miller
- Running time: 45 minutes

Original release
- Network: Travel Channel
- Release: September 14, 2018 – present

Related
- Ghost Asylum; Haunted Towns

Haunted Live is an American paranormal television series that premiered on September 14, 2018 in the United States on Travel Channel. The series features the Tennessee Wraith Chasers, a group of paranormal investigators who are famous for trying to "trap ghosts" during their investigations. This time, TWC are joined by viewers around the country who participate in live-on-air paranormal investigations through social media. The show initially aired on Fridays at 10 p.m. EST.

== Premise ==
With Jesse Blaze Snider as their host in the first two episodes, hosting duty continued with Jamie Kaler, viewers participate in a live interactive ghost hunts via social media as the Tennessee Wraith Chasers (TWC) need their help to investigate some of the most haunted locations in America. James McDaniel was in charge of the social media command center where all the live-streaming cameras and feeds were used during the viewers findings online.

During their live, unfiltered investigations, TWC perform various experiments to capture proof of paranormal activity while fans watch video feed streaming live to help lead the team to different areas needed for further investigation through Travel Channel's Facebook page. Afterwards, there is a Q&A sessions with TWC where fans can chat about their own findings.

Opening introduction:

We're the Tennessee Wraith Chasers. A band of brothers heading into the shadows and deep into the darkness to unravel the country's deepest and darkest mysteries. We're doing it live. And anything can happen.

== Cast ==
Tennessee Wraith Chasers:

- Chris Smith
- Steven "Doogie" McDougal
- Scott Porter
- Brannon Smith
- Mike Goncalves

Guest member:

- Angel Leigh - 'spiritual messenger' (Episode 1.2)

== Episodes ==
No.	Title	Location	Original release date
1	"Into the Fire"	Franklin, Kentucky	September 14, 2018
In the series premiere, the Tennessee Waith Chasers are back hunting for ghosts, this time they are investigating live with viewers from all over the country through social media. Their first interactive investigation takes them to Octagon Hall, an eight-side home that was once a safe house for Confederate troops. It's reported that slaves, soldiers and civilians are all buried and the grounds, causing plenty of paranormal activity.
2	"The Silver Scream"	Gallatin, Tennessee	September 21, 2018
TWC head to their home state for their live investigation of the historic Palace Theatre, where the ghosts of actors past still perform.
3	"Paranormal Powerhouse"	Castalian Springs, Tennessee	September 28, 2018
TWC stay in Tennessee to investigate the Cragfont House, an antebellum-style home which witnessed bloody battles and the oppression of slavery right on the property.
4	"Caught in the Crossfire"	Franklin, Tennessee	October 5, 2018
TWC continue their paranormal journey in their home state to investigate the Lotz House, a home that's haunted by the unsettled spirits who died in the bloody Battle of Franklin in the American Civil War.
5	"Where You Never Sleep Alone"	Wartrace, Tennessee	October 12, 2018
TWC and virtual viewers check into the Walking Horse Hotel, a historic inn established in 1917, currently closed to the public that's considered to be one of the most haunted hotels in the country.
6	"Spirits Unearthed"	Nashville, Tennessee	October 19, 2018
TWC live investigation leads them to the Two Rivers Mansion, where the remains of Native Americans were found during construction. They explore claims of a 'lady in black', who is endlessly searching for her daughter.
7	"A Grave Mistake"	Castalian Springs, Tennessee	October 26, 2018
TWC investigate the Wynnewood Estate, an antebellum home built in 1828 that was built on an Indian burial ground and plagued by paranormal activity.
8	"Headmaster's House of Horror"	Columbia, Tennessee	November 2, 2018
TWC investigate The Athenaeum, a grand house built in 1835 which housed the headmaster's of an all-girls school. It's also where the tragic deaths of six of the headmaster's twelve children occurred, and the deserted graves of Civil War soldiers leaves a heavy presence.
9	"The Soul Collector"	Gallatin, Tennessee	November 9, 2018
TWC conduct their live investigation at the Rose Mont, a 1836 plantation house where local legend says that the ghost of an old hag paralyzes visitors, trying to feed off their souls.
10	"The Curse of the Bell Witch"	Adams, Tennessee	November 16, 2018
TWC has their biggest live investigation when they invite viewers to the infamous Bell Witch farm, an 1800s cabin on the property that's said to still be haunted by the Bell Witch.

== See also ==
- Ghost hunting
- Apparitional experience
- Parapsychology
