= Trousdale-Baskerville House =

Historic house in Tennessee, United States

- U.S. National Register of Historic Places
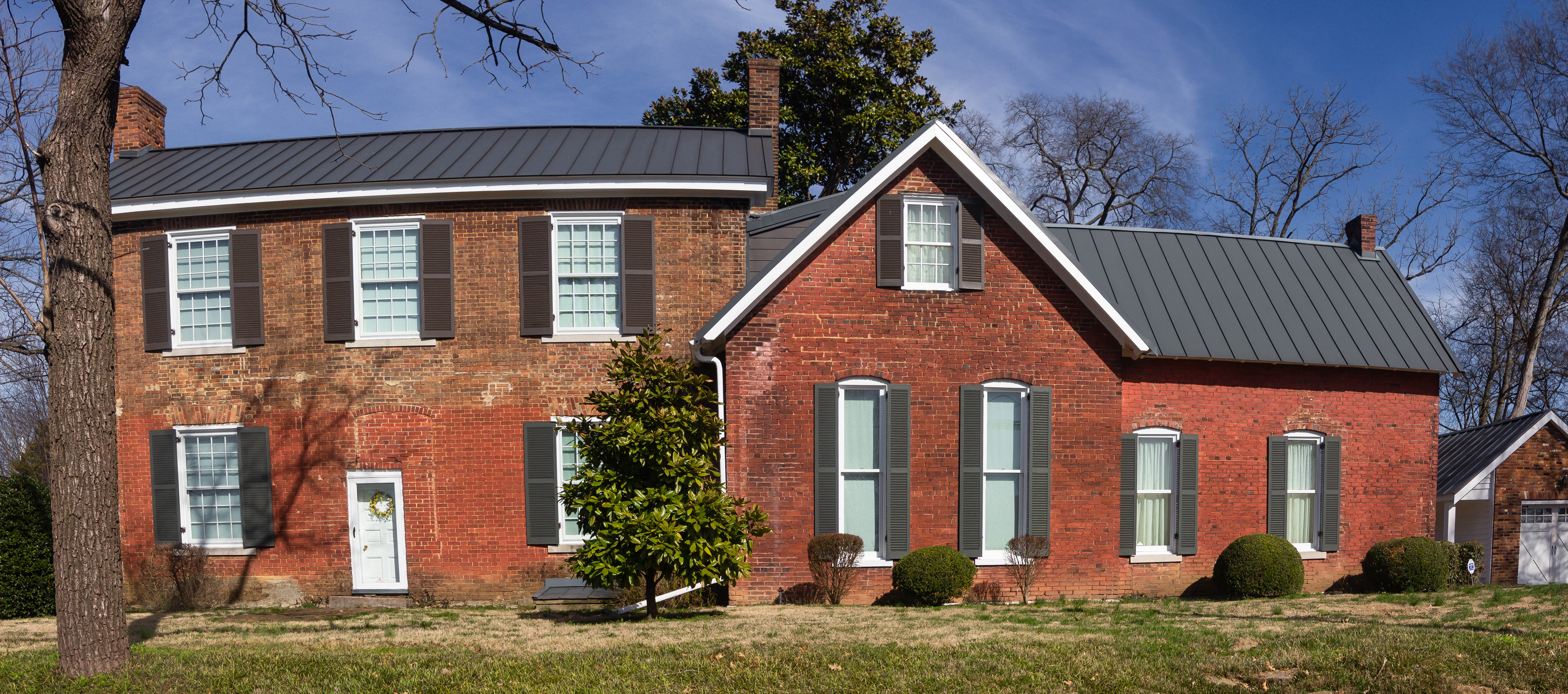

- Location within Tennessee
- Location: 211 West Smith Street, Gallatin, Tennessee
- Coordinates: 36°23′16″N 86°26′57″W
- Area: 1.2 acres (0.49 ha)
- Built: 1838
- Architectural style: Federal, Late Victorian
- NRHP reference No.: 09000577
- Added to NRHP: July 30, 2009

The Trousdale-Baskerville House, also known as Baskerville House and Maywood, is a historic house in Gallatin, Tennessee, U.S..

== History ==
The house was built in 1838 for Richard H. May, the owner of plantations near Natchez, Mississippi who sold it to Benjamin Franklin Simpson in 1839. It was owned by Colonel George Elliott, a veteran of the War of 1812 and the First Seminole War who owned Wall Spring, from 1842 to 1846, when it was purchased by Dr. John Washington Franklin. During the American Civil War of 1861–1865, Franklin joined the Confederate States Army as a surgeon.

From 1869 to 1900, the house belonged to Charles Trousdale, a Confederate veteran who was the son of Tennessee Governor William Trousdale. It belonged to Rebecca Donelson Dismukes from 1901 to 1911, when it was purchased by J.T. Baskerville.

== Architectural significance ==
The house was designed in the Federal architectural style. It was later redesigned in the Late Victorian and Colonial Revival architectural styles. It has been listed on the National Register of Historic Places since July 30, 2009.
