= Greenfield (Castalian Springs, Tennessee) =

Historic house in Tennessee, United States

- U.S. National Register of Historic Places
- U.S. Historic district
- Nearest city: Castalian Springs, Tennessee
- Area: 26 acres (11 ha)
- Built: 1840
- Architectural style: Federal
- NRHP reference No.: 90001579
- Added to NRHP: November 7, 1990

Greenfield, also known as the David Chenault Home, is a historic farmhouse in Castalian Springs, Tennessee, U.S..

The house was built in 1840 by John Fontville, who also built the James B. Jameson House and Oakland in Gallatin. David Chenault, the original owner, was the son of a French immigrant; he lived here with his wife Louisa Quisenberry and their children. Chenault later purchased the Brown-Chenault House, and the Chenaults lived on both farms. Greenfield was inherited by their son Milton in 1883, and it remained in the Chenault family until 1913.

The house has been listed on the National Register of Historic Places since November 7, 1990.
