= Oakland (Gallatin, Tennessee) =

Historic house in Tennessee, United States

- U.S. National Register of Historic Places
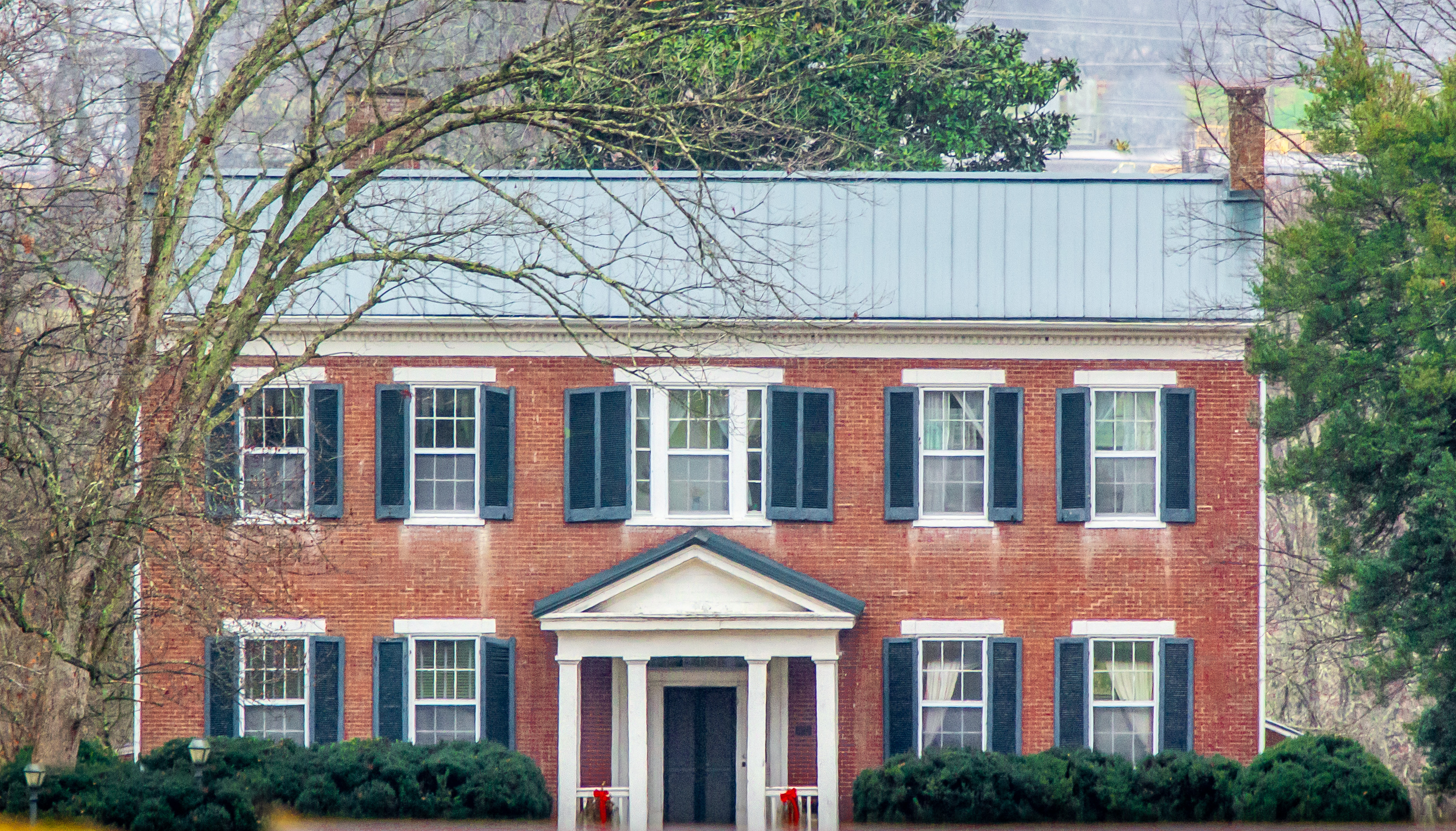

- Location within Tennessee Location within the United States
- Nearest city: Gallatin, Tennessee
- Area: 12.4 acres (5.0 ha)
- Built: 1850
- NRHP reference No.: 92000841
- Added to NRHP: October 2, 1992

Oakland is a historic mansion on a farm in Sumner County, Tennessee near Gallatin, U.S. It was built circa 1850 by John Fontville, who also built the James B. Jameson House in Gallatin and Greenfield in Castalian Springs. The original owner, Daniel Wade Mentlo, was a physician who owned 23 slaves in 1850.

The house was designed in the Federal architectural style, with Greek Revival features. It has been listed on the National Register of Historic Places since October 2, 1992.
