= Humphrey Bate =

American musician (1875–1936)

- Born: Humphrey Bate; May 25, 1875; Castalian Springs, Tennessee
- Died: June 12, 1936 (aged 61) Castalian Springs, Tennessee
- Genres: Old-time music
- Instruments: Harmonica, vocals
- Years active: 1925–1936
- Labels: Brunswick

Humphrey Bate (May 25, 1875 – June 12, 1936) was an American harmonica player and string band leader. He was the first musician to play old-time music on Nashville-area radio. Bate and his band, which had been given the name "Dr. Humphrey Bate & His Possum Hunters" by Opry founder George D. Hay, were regulars on the Grand Ole Opry until Bate's death in 1936. The band's recordings, while scant, are considered some of the most distinctive and complex string band compositions in the old-time genre.

== Early life ==
Humphrey Bate was born in Castalian Springs, Tennessee on May 25, 1875, to a prominent Middle Tennessee family. Several of Bate's relatives had served as Confederate officers in the American Civil War, including a captain— also named Humphrey Bate— who was killed at the Battle of Shiloh. Bate's cousin, William Brimage Bate, served as Governor of Tennessee in the 1880s. The Bate family owned several plantations throughout the southeast, and Humphrey probably learned to play dance tunes from freed slaves living on his father's plantation in Castalian Springs.

Throughout his teen years, Bate collected pocket change by playing harmonica on steamboats travelling up and down the Cumberland River. He eventually attended medical school at Vanderbilt University in Nashville and served as a surgeon in the Spanish–American War (1898). While Bate worked primarily as a physician for most of his life, he never lost his passion for playing music. He likely formed his first string band sometime around 1900, and subsequently acquired a reputation in the Nashville area by playing at various rallies and silent movie theaters.

== The Opry years, 1925–1936 ==
In September 1925, Bate and his band became the first musicians to play old-time music on Nashville radio when they performed on the small local station WDAD. A month later, William Craig, a purchasing agent for the National Life and Accident Insurance Company, invited Bate to play on the company's new radio station, WSM, which could reach a much wider audience than WDAD. Bate happily accepted, and over the following weeks, he and his band— which was typically called "Dr. Bate's Band" or some similar variation— played on WDAD in the afternoon and WSM in the evening.

In November 1925, WSM hired announcer George Hay, who had developed a popular program called National Barn Dance for Chicago radio station WLS. Hay kept the barn dance format for WSM, and sought rural musicians from the Nashville area to play on the program. WSM's Barn Dance first aired on November 28, 1925, with legendary fiddler Uncle Jimmy Thompson as its first performer. Bate made his appearance on this particular program three weeks later. The band was first introduced as "Dr. Humphrey Bate and His Augmented String Orchestra," but Hay eventually changed the name to the more rural-sounding "Dr. Humphrey Bate and His Possum Hunters."

In 1927, Hay changed the name of WSM's Barn Dance to the "Grand Ole Opry." Over the next several years, Bate— dubbed the "Dean of the Opry" by Hay— performed regularly on the program. Bate's band was unusually large for a string band, typically consisting of two fiddles, two guitars, a banjo, a cello, and a bowed bass. Regular bandmates included guitarists Burt Hutcherson and Staley Walton, fiddlers Oscar Stone and Bill Barrett, banjo player Walter Liggett, and bassist Oscar Albright. Bate's daughter Alcyone Bate Beasley often performed with the band as a ukulele player. The band's set usually opened with the song, "There'll Be a Hot Time in the Old Town Tonight," and the band's repertoire included "Old Joe," "Greenback Dollar," "Going Uptown," and "Eighth of January."

Dr. Humphrey Bate and His Possum Hunters held their only major recording session on March 3, 1928, in Atlanta, when they recorded twelve sides for Brunswick Records. In 1931, the band became the first Opry band to go on tour. Bate was also instrumental in introducing Hay to various Nashville-area musicians, including the Crook Brothers and DeFord Bailey. On June 12, 1936, Bate died of a heart attack at his home in Castalian Springs. The Possum Hunters continued playing with various line-ups (some of which included Bate's son, Humphrey, Jr.) until the 1960s.

Bate's home in Castalian Springs, Hawthorn Hill, is listed on the National Register of Historic Places. Built c. 1805, it is a Tennessee State Historic Site. Tours for Hawthorn Hill in Castalian Springs, TN, are special, limited, guided tours offered only one Saturday per month from April through October, requiring advance reservation.[https://www.historiccastaliansprings.org/plan-your-visit.

== Discography ==
- Harmonica Masters (Yazoo, 1996) — contains the track, "Take Your Foot Out of the Mud & Put it in the Sand"
- Nashville - Early String Bands, Vol. 1 (County, 2000) — contains the tracks "Green Backed Dollar Bill," "Eighth of January," "Throw the Old Cow Over the Fence," and "My Wife Died Saturday Night"
