= Octagon Hall =

Historic house in Kentucky, United States

- U.S. National Register of Historic Places
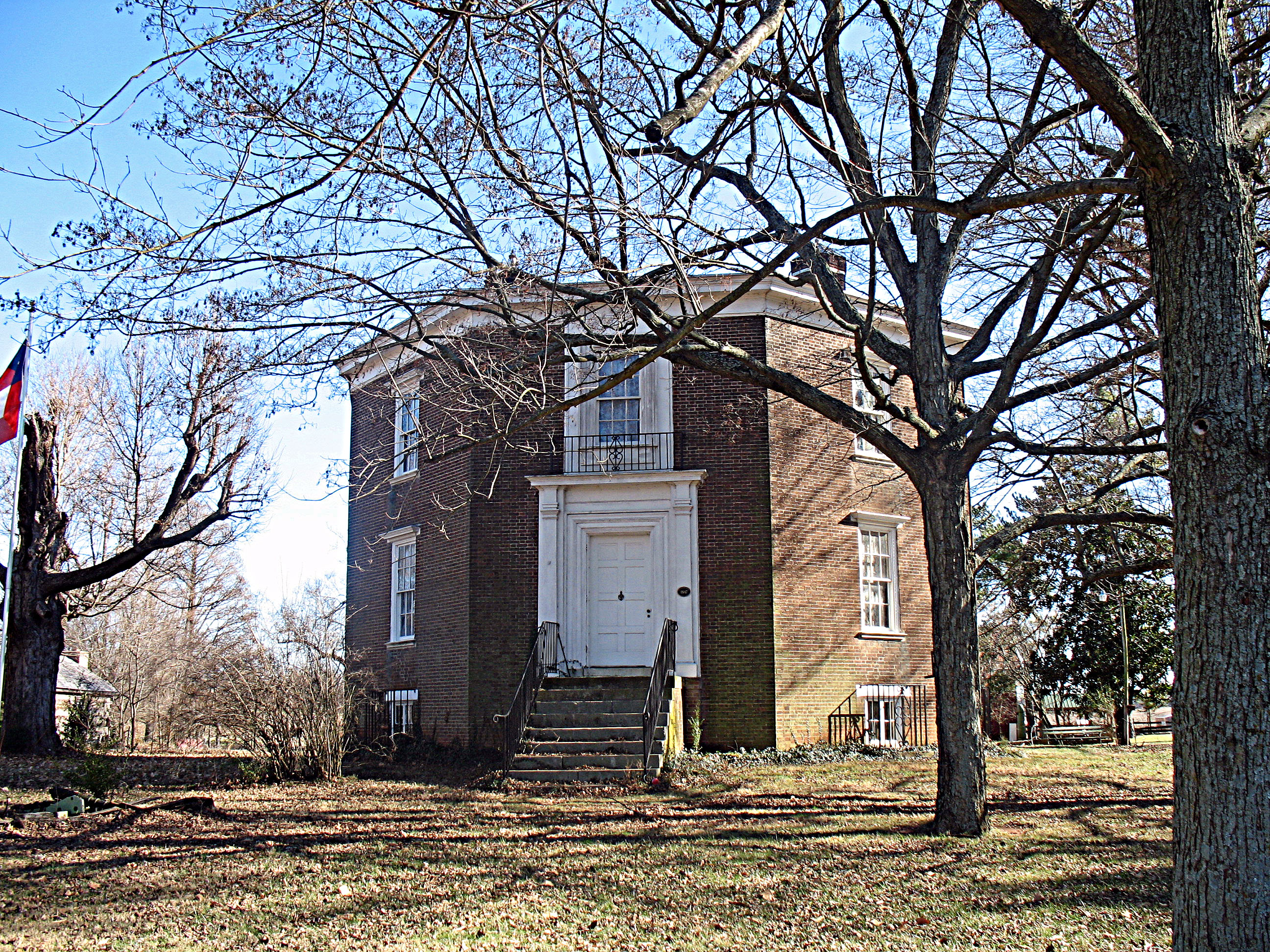

- Location within Kentucky Location within the United States
- Nearest city: Franklin, Kentucky
- Coordinates: 36°48′25″N 86°33′25″W
- Area: 1.8 acres (0.73 ha)
- Built: 1862
- NRHP reference No.: 80001667
- Added to NRHP: April 10, 1980

Octagon Hall is an eight-sided house in Simpson County, Kentucky near Franklin, Kentucky completed around 1860. It was listed on the National Register of Historic Places in 1980. It has also been known as the Andrew Jackson Caldwell House after the man who built the house. There is a second contributing building on the property, a detached summer kitchen.

Octagon Hall is located northeast of Franklin, Kentucky on U.S. Route 31W.

== Architecture ==
It is a red brick, two-story octagonal house with a high basement. The octagonal plan was likely inspired by Orson Squire Fowler's 1848 book, The Octagon House: A Home for All, which developed a trend in American architecture starting in the 1850s. It is one of two surviving octagonal structures in Kentucky.

The three front facades have brick laid in Flemish bond, while brickwork is common bond elsewhere.

== History ==
In 1847, Andrew Jackson Caldwell laid out the foundation for a distinctive new family home. By 1860, Caldwell was living there with his wife Harriet Morton Caldwell, daughters Frances, Mary, and Martha, and son Henry.

During the Civil War, Octagon Hall served as a hospital for both Confederate and Union soldiers. It also doubled as a hideout for Confederate troops on the run from the Union army.

Harriet Caldwell lived in the house after her husband's death in 1866. After 1916, the property was sold to Miles Williams, a Nashville doctor.

In 2001, the property was purchased by the Octagon Hall Foundation. Director Billy D. Byrd has operated the site as a non-profit museum and local attraction, highlighting the paranormal experiences he has reported there. Currently, it is the site of the Octagon Hall Museum & Kentucky Confederate Studies Archive. It includes a library, a display of Civil War artifacts, Native American artifacts, and genealogical and historical research material. A slave cemetery and historic gardens are on the grounds.

== In popular culture ==
Octagon Hall has been promoted and popularized as a haunted place. Octagon Hall has been featured on A&E, Syfy, History Channel, Discovery Channel, and many others. It was featured on Haunted Live on the Travel Channel in 2018.
