= Two Rivers Mansion (Nashville, Tennessee) =

Historic house in Tennessee, United States

- U.S. National Register of Historic Places
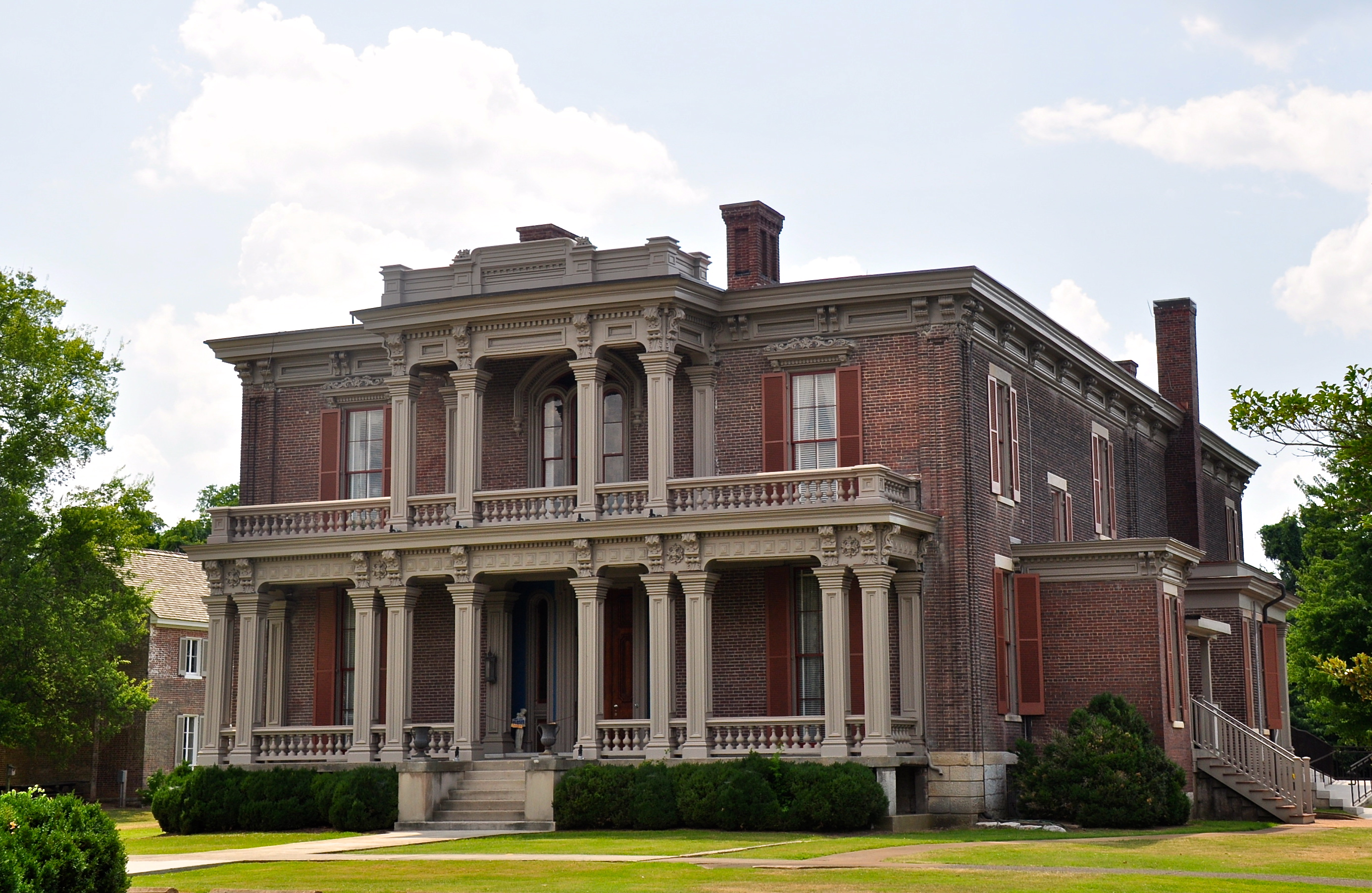
- Two Rivers Mansion, July 2014

- Location within Tennessee Location within the United States
- Location: 3130 McGavock Pike, Nashville, Tennessee
- Coordinates: 36°11′23″N 86°40′39″W
- Built: 1859
- Architectural style: Italianate
- NRHP reference No.: 72001238
- Added to NRHP: February 23, 1972

Two Rivers Mansion is an Antebellum historic house in Nashville, Tennessee, United States.

== History ==
The mansion was built in 1859 for David H. McGavock (1826–1896), a cousin of the McGavocks who owned the Carnton plantation in Franklin, Tennessee, and his wife William "Willie" Elizabeth Harding (1832–1895), whose family owned the Belle Meade Plantation. During construction of the mansion, the McGavock family lived in the adjacent house named 'The 1802 House', a Federal-style red brick home. Both properties were once the centerpiece of an 1,100-acre plantation in Donelson, Tennessee.

Two Rivers was inhabited by the McGavock family for three generations until 1965, when it was purchased by the Metropolitan Government of Nashville and Davidson County from Mary Louise Bransford McGavock.

The land was turned into the Two Rivers Park and Golf Course, with eighteen holes of golf, baseball and softball diamonds, six tennis courts and a playground.

== Architectural significance ==
Two Rivers was designed in the Italianate architectural style. It was listed on the National Register of Historic Places on February 23, 1972.

== Location ==
The mansion is located at 3130 McGavock Pike in Nashville, Tennessee. It is located between the Stones River and the Cumberland River, hence the name.

== In popular culture ==
Two Rivers Mansion and The 1802 House were featured as a haunted location on the paranormal series, Haunted Live which aired in 2018 on the Travel Channel. The paranormal team, the Tennessee Wraith Chasers investigated both buildings which are said to be highly haunted.

== Bibliography ==
- Leona Taylor Aiken, The McGavocks of Two Rivers, Aiken, 1975, 51 pages.
