= Wynnewood (Tennessee) =

- Wynnewood State Historic Site
- U.S. National Register of Historic Places
- U.S. National Historic Landmark District
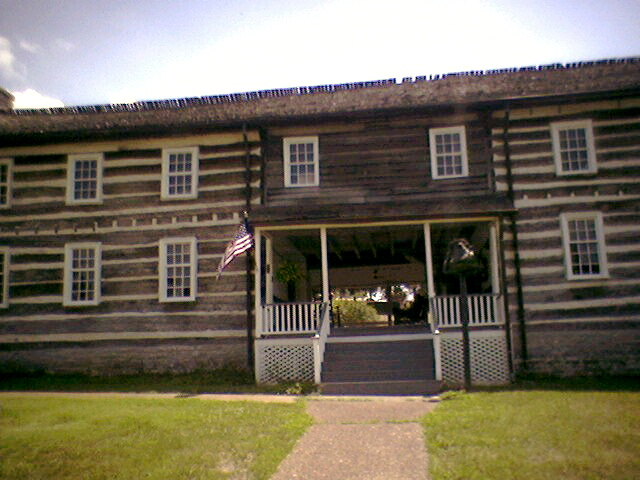

- Location within Tennessee Location within the United States
- Location: 205 Old TN 25, Castalian Springs, Tennessee
- Coordinates: 36°23′39″N 86°18′59″W
- Area: 8 acres (3.2 ha)
- Built: 1828
- NRHP reference No.: 71000838

Significant dates
- Added to NRHP: July 14, 1971
- Designated NHLD: November 11, 1971

Wynnewood, also known as Castalian Springs, is a historic estate in Castalian Springs, Sumner County, Tennessee. The property is owned by the state of Tennessee and its official name is the Wynnewood State Historic Site, it includes an 1828 former inn that is the largest existing log structure in Tennessee. The property is operated by the Historic Castalian Springs under an agreement with the Tennessee Historical Commission. It was designated a National Historic Landmark in 1971.

== Description ==
Wynnewood is located in southeastern Sumner County, and the west side of the hamlet of Castalian Springs, on the south side of Old Highway 25. Set on 8 acres (3.2 ha) overlooking Lick Creek to the north and west, its main feature is a group of six log buildings. The largest of these, the former inn, is two stories in height and measures 110 by 22 feet (33.5 m × 6.7 m). It is built in an oversized version of the traditional dogtrot house, with two separate white oak log structures joined via a central enclosed space under a common roof. Attached to this main building via a covered back porch are two kitchens. Other detached buildings, all built of cedar logs, include a smokehouse, office, and 20th-century garage.

== History ==
The main building was built in 1828 by A. R. Wynne, William Cage, and Stephen Roberts, to serve as a stagecoach inn for travelers between Nashville and Knoxville, and for people taking the waters of the nearby sulphur springs. In 1834, Wynne purchased his partners' shares in the property and moved into the inn with his family, where he resided until his death in 1893. The property was purchased from the Wynne family by the state in 1970 and developed as a historic site.

On February 5, 2008, during the 2008 Super Tuesday tornado outbreak, Wynnewood suffered major damage to much of the second story, roof, and trees on the property. It re-opened to the public on July 4, 2012 after a four-year, $4 million restoration project overseen by the Tennessee Historical Commission and funded by the Federal Emergency Management Agency (FEMA), insurance proceeds, and the state government of Tennessee. More of the property is now open to the public than was the case before the tornado.

== In popular culture ==
=== Television ===
Wynnewood was featured as a haunted location on the paranormal series, Haunted Live which aired in 2018 on the Travel Channel. The paranormal team, the Tennessee Wraith Chasers investigated the estate, which is said to be highly haunted.

== See also ==
- List of National Historic Landmarks in Tennessee
- National Register of Historic Places listings in Sumner County, Tennessee
