= Durham's Chapel School =

- U.S. National Register of Historic Places
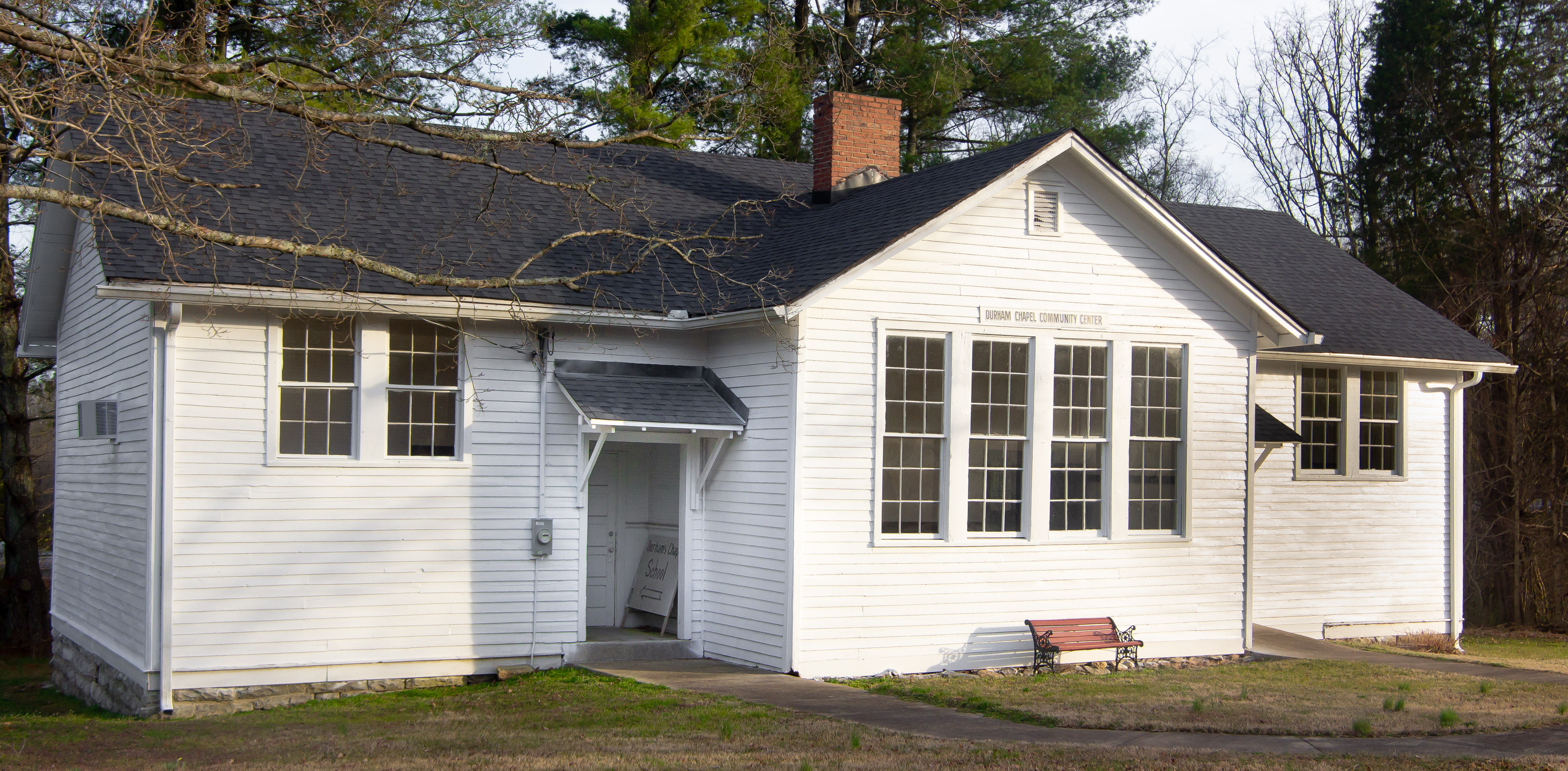

- Location within Tennessee Location within the United States
- Location: 5055 Old TN 31E
- Nearest city: Bethpage, Tennessee
- Coordinates: 36°28′16″N 86°19′51″W
- Area: 1.5 acres (0.61 ha)
- Built: 1923
- NRHP reference No.: 06000652
- Added to NRHP: November 8, 2006

Durham's Chapel School, also known as Durham's Chapel Rosenwald School, is a former school for African-American children located in Bethpage, Tennessee, that is listed on the National Register of Historic Places.

== Description ==
The school was built in 1923 as a Rosenwald school, one of seven such schools eventually built in Sumner County. Construction of Durham's Chapel School began shortly after the Cairo Rosenwald School was started. The Rosenwald Fund provided $700 toward the cost of construction, and the remainder of the $3750 cost was split evenly between the Tennessee public school fund and the local African-American community.

The building design was a standard Rosenwald Fund plan for a two-teacher school with an industrial room. It is a one-story building on a limestone block foundation with weatherboard siding and a shingled cross-gable roof. It has decorative details inspired by Craftsman architecture, including wide-overhanging eaves and exposed rafter tails.

The school interior includes two classrooms separated by moveable partitions that could be opened to create a larger space for school presentations and community events. An industrial room projects from the center of the building. The industrial room was used for home economics instruction. Heat for the building was provided by a single wood-burning stove. Most of the original elements of the building were extant as of 2006, including cabinets, doors, moldings, hardware, chalkboards, the wood-burning stove, and a wooden stage at the southwestern end of the building. The kitchen sink, refrigerator, and cooking stove in the industrial room were installed in 1955 after the Brown v. Board of Education decision led Sumner County officials to allocate some funds to improve facilities in the county's segregated African-American schools.

== History ==
The Durham's Chapel community was formed by former African-American slaves in the early years after the Civil War. Durham's Chapel Baptist Church was founded in 1866 by the Reverend Peter Vertrees, a mulatto who helped establish numerous African-American churches and schools in Middle Tennessee. Land for the church and school were donated by a local man named Rodney Durham. The Durham's Chapel church building, located adjacent to the school, was completed in 1870 and is still in use.

The Rosenwald school was the third black school to be established in the Durham's Chapel community. The earliest one-room school was destroyed by fire. The second school, known as "The Little Red School House", was built before 1900 at a site east of the church building; it was used until the Rosenwald school was completed.

Throughout its history, the school was closely associated with Durham's Chapel Church, while also receiving government support. White people in Sumner County supported the school's home economics training program for girls in order to qualify them for employment as domestic servants.

The school closed in 1962, but the building still stands and is currently used by the church for meetings. It was listed on the National Register of Historic Places in 2006. By that time, only three of the seven Rosenwald schools in Sumner County (including Cairo Rosenwald School and Durham's Chapel School) were still standing. A restoration project was completed in 2012 at a cost of $40,000.
