= Brown-Chenault House =

Historic house in Tennessee, United States

- U.S. National Register of Historic Places
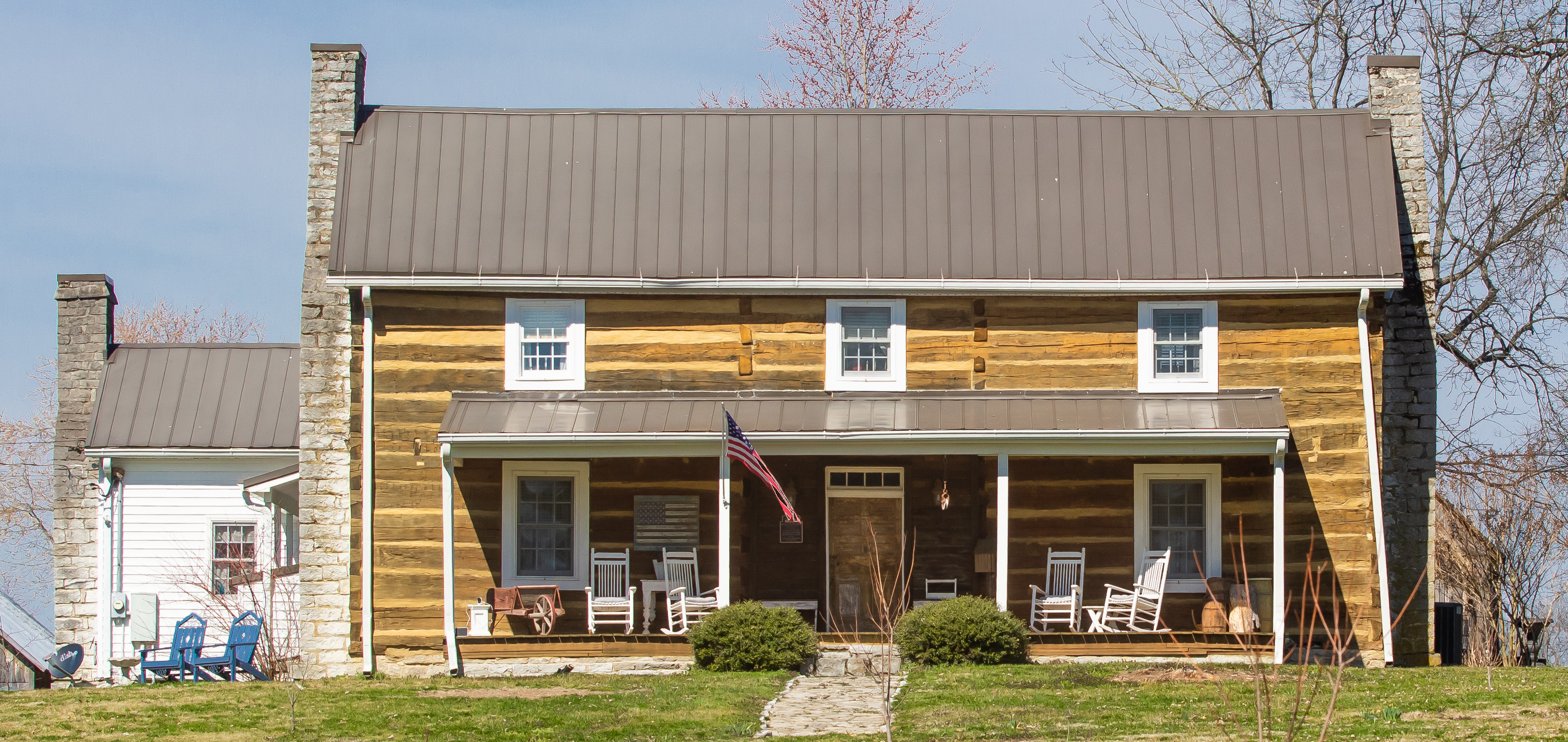

- Location within Tennessee
- Interactive map showing the location of Brown-Chenault House
- Nearest city: Castalian Springs, Tennessee
- Coordinates: 36°25′33″N 86°18′10″W
- Area: 1.3 acres (0.53 ha)
- Built: 1835
- NRHP reference No.: 85001614
- Added to NRHP: July 25, 1985

The Brown-Chenault House, also known as Campbell Farm, is a historic house in Castalian Springs, Tennessee, United States.

== History ==
The farmhouse was built as a log house circa 1835 for George T. Brown, his wife and their children. Brown was a farmer who owned 4 slaves in 1838.

The farm was purchased by David Chenault, the owner of Greenfield, in 1850. Chenault, whose father was a French immigrant, lived on the two properties with his wife, nine sons and four daughters. During the American Civil War of 1861–1865, his son Colby Chenault joined the Confederate States Army and served under General John Hunt Morgan. In 1867, Colby moved into the house, where he lived with his wife, Araminta Harper, and their nine children.

The farmhouse has been listed on the National Register of Historic Places since July 25, 1985.
