= Moye Boarding House =

- U.S. National Register of Historic Places
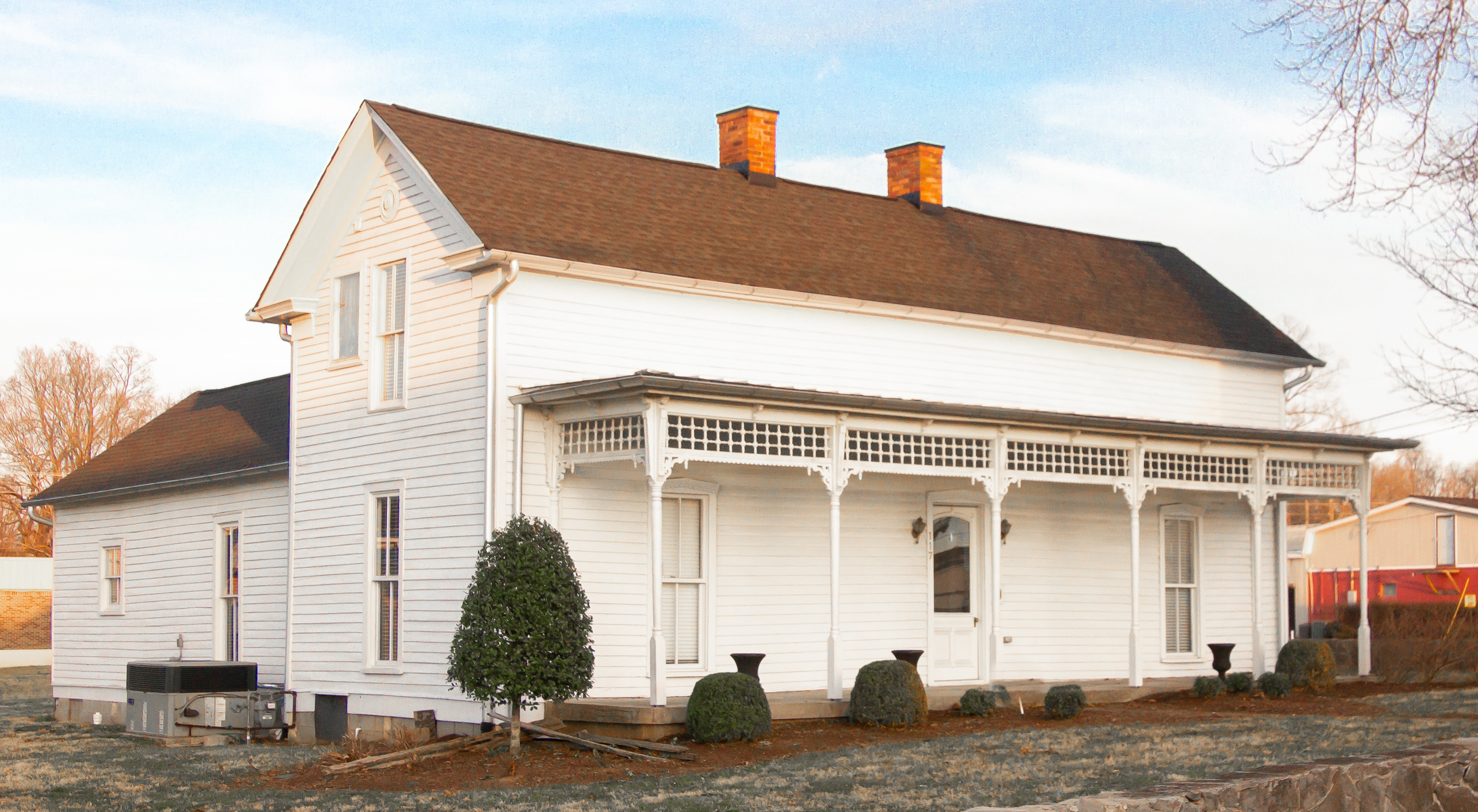

- Location within Tennessee
- Location: NE. corner of Wheeler & North Russell Streets, Portland, Tennessee
- Coordinates: 36°34′55″N 86°30′54″W
- Area: less than one acre
- Built: 1878
- Architectural style: Folk Victorian
- NRHP reference No.: 13000124
- Added to NRHP: March 27, 2013

The Moye Boarding House is a historic building in Portland, Tennessee. It was built in 1878–1892 for A.C. Butt or Kate Moye on land formerly owned by Thomas Buntin. It was a boarding house on the Louisville & Nashville Railroad from 1890 to 1945. It was acquired by the city of Portland in 2011, and it received $15,000 from the Tennessee Historical Commission and the Historic Preservation Fund to be restored in 2016. The building was designed in the Folk Victorian architectural style. It has been listed on the National Register of Historic Places since March 27, 2013.
