= Walnut Grove (Gallatin, Tennessee) =

Historic house in Tennessee, United States

- U.S. National Register of Historic Places
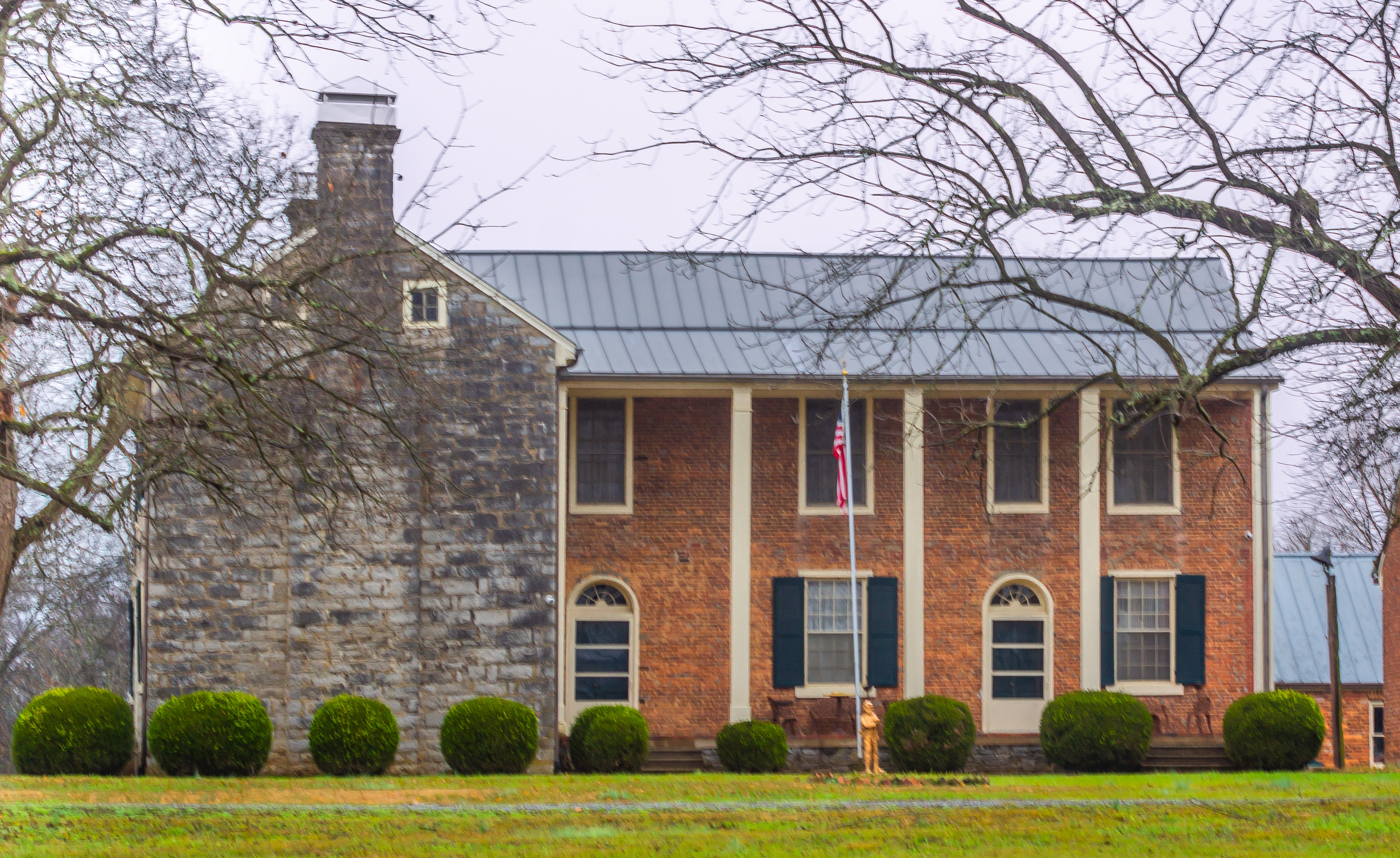

- Location within Tennessee
- Nearest city: Gallatin, Tennessee
- Coordinates: 36°23′30″N 86°28′18″W
- Area: 5.9 acres (2.4 ha)
- Built: 1792
- NRHP reference No.: 78002642
- Added to NRHP: December 29, 1978

The Walnut Grove is a historic mansion in Gallatin, Tennessee, U.S.. It was built in 1792 within what was, at the time, the Territory South of the Ohio River (before the formation of the State of Tennessee in 1796). The limestone construction is incredibly similar to Rock Castle in Hendersonville, which was built at the same time. The red brick expansion was built pre-1825 with interior architecture resembling Andrew Jackson’s Hermitage. The original builder was Pierce Wall, who bought 320 acres from Issac Bledsoe in 1790, before Bledsoe, the land was apart of John Wither’s 640 acre Revolutionary grant. After Wall’s death in 1798 the land was separated between his two sons, Simon and Hugh. Charles Elliot bought the property in the early 1800s, his brother George Elliot lived at Wall Spring nearby. It includes a portico, and a staircase designed in the Federal style. It has been listed on the National Register of Historic Places since December 29, 1978, at which time the property was the primary residence of Donald K. Wright and his wife. Wright was a former Senator for the state of Tennessee, accomplished author, and subsequent Mayor of Gallatin, Tennessee.

The mansion has three floors, one of which is completely underground (formerly a root cellar and kitchen). The bottom floor has since been remodeled and finished into a more modern bedroom, bathroom, closets, and den/kitchen. However, the original kitchen hearth and cellar entrance from the surface remains. The ground floor and second story are unmodified, minus modern HVAC and electrical systems. The house has a total of 5 bedrooms, 3 bathrooms, 2 kitchens, a dining hall, a living room, 2 sitting rooms, a grand foyer, and six wood fireplaces. The original plantation office, smokehouse, and carriage house also remain on the property, however the carriage house is now a four car garage. Slave quarters were also on the property, and evidence of slaves residing on the property have been found over the years, but the quarters themselves are no longer in existence. This is the case for many former plantations, as the slave quarters were torn down or fell into disrepair to the point of collapse after the end of the Civil War.

Many American Civil War era artifacts have been found on the grounds, left behind from the occupation of Union troops in the area. The walls of the original masonry-built house, pre 1825 red-brick addition, measure around two feet thick. The reason for this unusual thickness is because the house was constructed during a period of hostilities with Native American tribes in the area, and the thickness of the walls protected occupants from arrows and musket balls being fired at the house. The April term for the Sumner County Court was held here at this place in 1793.
