= Daniel Smith Donelson =

Confederate Army general

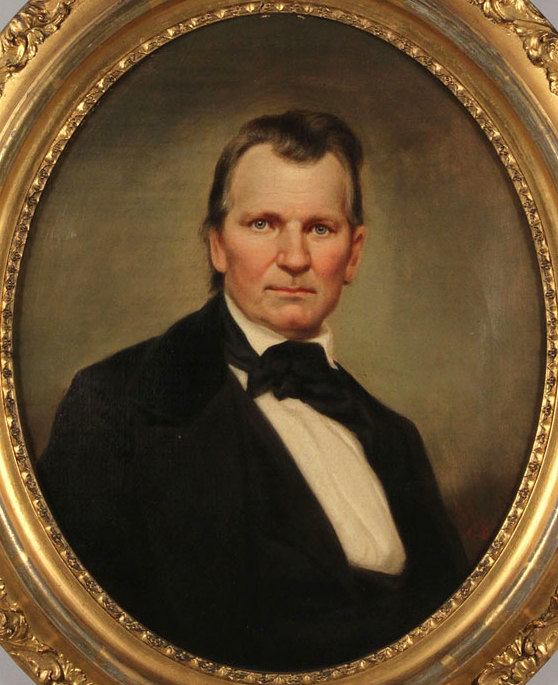
- Portrait of Donelson by George Dury, circa 1850
- Born: June 23, 1801; Sumner County, Tennessee, U.S.
- Died: April 17, 1863 (aged 61); Knoxville, Tennessee, C.S.
- Burial place: Presbyterian Cemetery Hendersonville, Tennessee
- Relatives: Andrew Jackson (Uncle); Rachel Jackson (Aunt); John Donelson Martin (cousin)
- Military career
- Allegiance: United States of America; Tennessee State Militia; Confederate States of America
- Branch: United States Army; Confederate States Army
- Service years: 1825–1834 (USA); 1861–1863 (CSA)
- Rank: Second Lieutenant (USA); Brigadier General (Tennessee); Major General (CSA)
- Conflicts: American Civil War: Battle of Perryville; Battle of Stones River

Daniel Smith Donelson (June 23, 1801 – April 17, 1863) was an American planter, politician, and military officer. The historic Fort Donelson was named for him when he was serving as a brigadier general in the Tennessee state militia during the American Civil War. He was commissioned as a Confederate general, serving notably at the battles of Perryville and Stones River.

After their father died when Donelson and his two brothers were young, the three boys were taken in and adopted by their paternal aunt Rachel Donelson Jackson and her husband Andrew Jackson, a future United States president.

== Early life and education ==
Daniel Smith Donelson was born in Sumner County, Tennessee, the youngest of three sons of Samuel and Mary "Polly" (Smith) Donelson. Donelson's father died when Daniel was about five. After their mother remarried, Donelson and his two brothers were taken in by their paternal aunt, Rachel Donelson Jackson, and her husband Andrew Jackson, a future president. Rachel and Andrew Jackson adopted Donelson and his two brothers and they grew up at The Hermitage.

His older brother, Andrew Jackson Donelson, who served as private secretary to Jackson during his presidency, was a vice presidential candidate in his own right in 1856.

Donelson's paternal grandfather was Colonel John Donelson, a frontiersman and founder of Nashville, Tennessee, and his maternal grandfather, Colonel Daniel Smith, was a Revolutionary War officer, an early leader in middle Tennessee and one of Tennessee's first U.S. Senators.

In 1821, Donelson entered West Point, and graduated in 1825, becoming a United States Army officer. He resigned his commission half a year later, on January 22, 1826, to become a planter in Sumner County, Tennessee.

== Planter, militia and politics ==
He became a member of the militia in that state. Starting as a brigade major in 1827, he was promoted to brigadier general in 1829.

In 1834, Donelson resigned his commission in the Tennessee militia and moved to Florida, where he worked as a planter until 1836. His stay there was brief, and he returned to Tennessee two years later, still a planter.

In 1841, Donelson was elected to the Tennessee House of Representatives. He left after one two-year term in 1841–1843. More than a decade later, he was elected again, serving from 1855–1861. He was chosen as Speaker for the term 1859–1861.

== Personal life ==
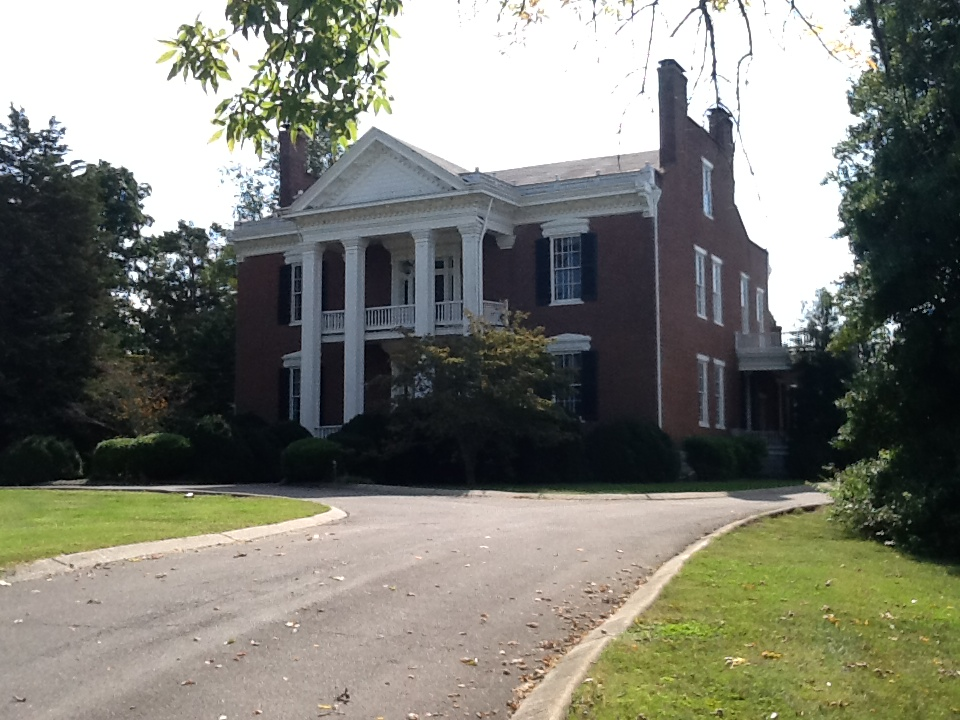
Hazel Path in Hendersonville, Tennessee.

Donelson and his wife Margaret had 10 children born between 1834 and 1854: Mary, Sarah, Emily, Rebecca, Samuel, Martha, James, Susan, John B., and Daniel.

They resided first at the Daniel Smith Donelson House and later at Hazel Path, both located in Hendersonville, Tennessee.

== Civil War ==
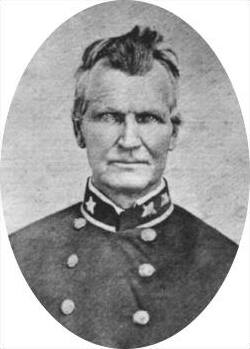
Photograph of Donelson as a Confederate general

With the outbreak of the Civil War in 1861, Donelson volunteered for the Tennessee militia. He left behind his plantation and service as Speaker of the Tennessee House of Representatives.

He was returned to his previous rank of brigadier general in the militia. That May he approved the sites for construction of Fort Henry and Fort Donelson, the latter named in his honor. (Fort Henry was a poor site, as it nearly flooded and was easily captured by Union General Grant.)

After Tennessee joined the Confederacy, Donelson became a brigadier general in the Confederate Army on July 9, 1861. In the following two years, he was active in several campaigns, including Robert E. Lee's Western Virginia Campaign of 1861. He led the initial assault at the Battle of Perryville, and fought at the Battle of Stones River. He was transferred briefly to help defend Charleston, South Carolina and the inner coastal region. Afterward he eventually rose to command of the Department of East Tennessee.

Donelson was promoted to major general on 5 March 1863 (to rank from 17 January); the Confederate Senate approved his appointment on April 22, prior to learning of his death a week earlier. He died of chronic diarrhea at the mineral water resort Montvale Springs, near Knoxville, Tennessee. He was buried in the Presbyterian Cemetery in Hendersonville, Tennessee.

== See also ==
- List of American Civil War generals (Confederate)
- Wards of Andrew Jackson
