= Daniel Smith Donelson House =

Historic house in Tennessee, United States

- U.S. National Register of Historic Places
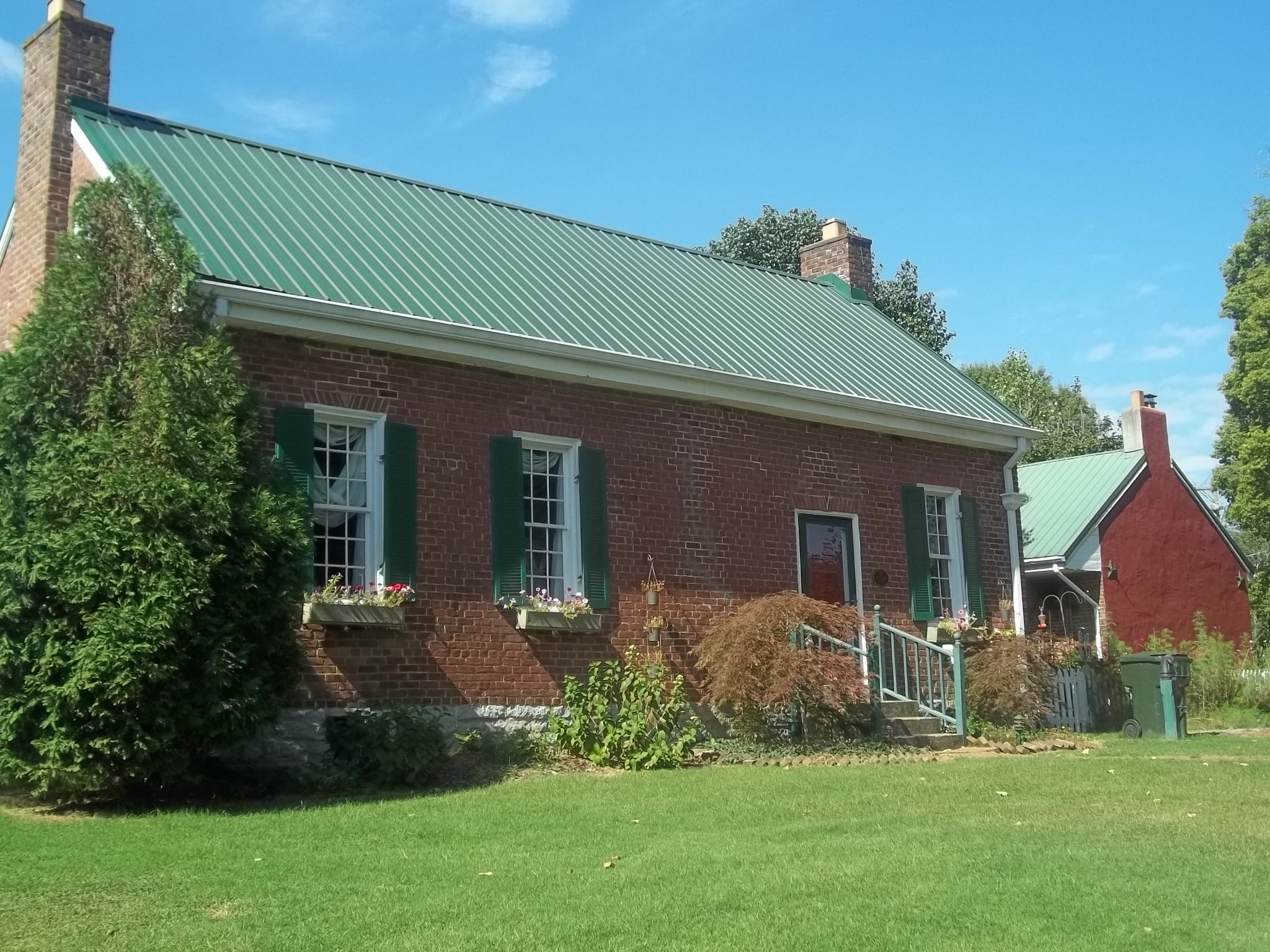
- The Daniel Smith Donelson House in 2014

- Location within Tennessee Location within the United States
- Location: 178 Berrywood Drive, Hendersonville, Tennessee
- Coordinates: 36°17′51″N 86°35′44″W
- Area: less than one acre
- Built: 1830
- Architectural style: Federal
- NRHP reference No.: 83003071
- Added to NRHP: January 4, 1983

The Daniel Smith Donelson House, also known as Eventide, is a historic house in Hendersonville, Tennessee, U.S..

The house was built circa 1830 for Daniel Smith Donelson, a nephew of U.S. President Andrew Jackson and son-in-law of U.S. Navy Secretary John Branch. The Donelsons resided here with their 11 children until they moved to Hazel Path in 1857. During the American Civil War of 1861–1865, Donelson served as a major general in the Confederate States Army. The house remained in the Donelson family until 1979.

The house was designed in the Federal architectural style. It has been listed on the National Register of Historic Places since January 4, 1983.
