= Wall Spring =

Historic house in Tennessee, United States

- U.S. National Register of Historic Places
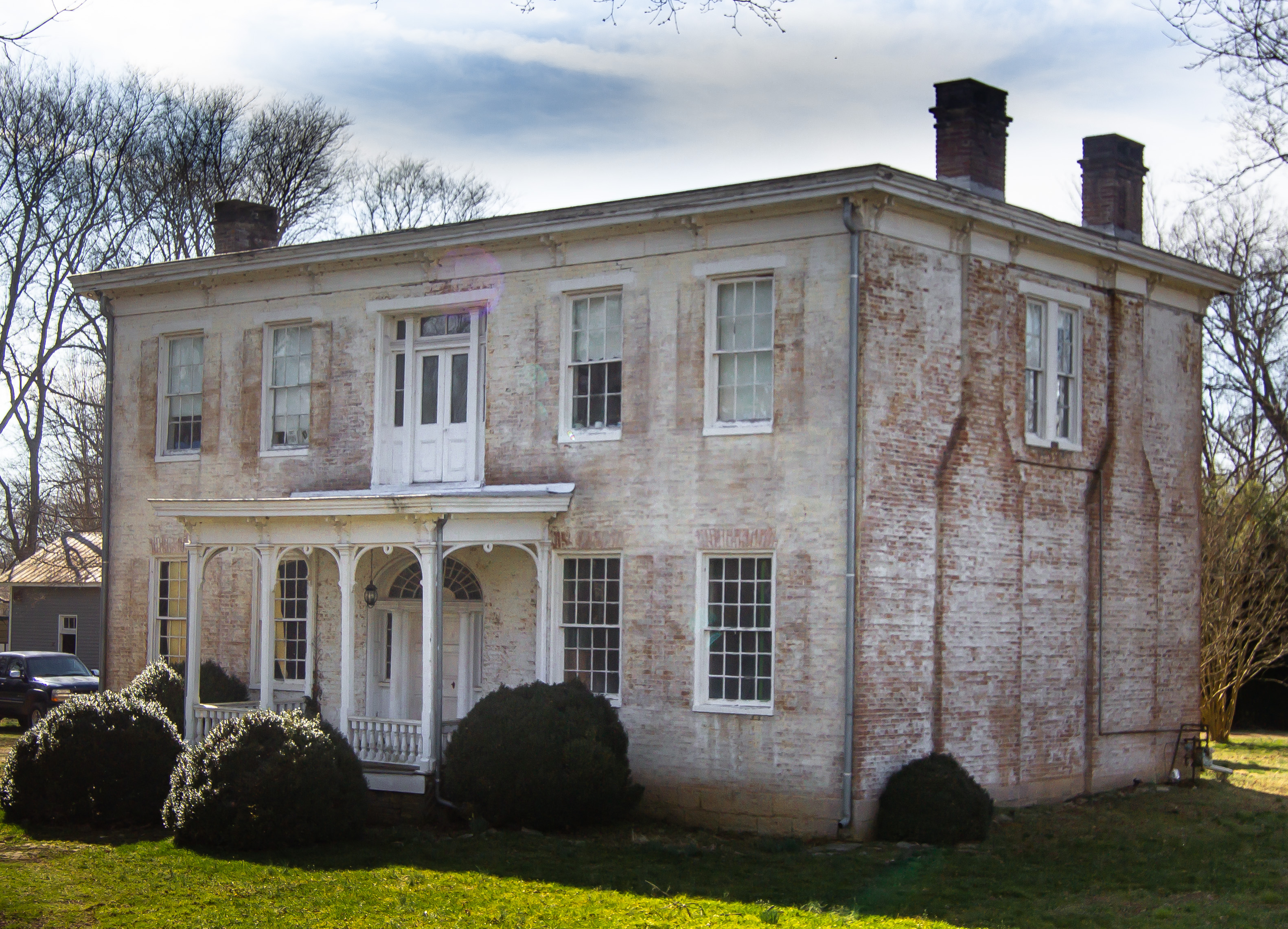

- Location within Tennessee
- Location: 931 Red River Road, Gallatin, Tennessee
- Coordinates: 36°23′40″N 86°28′11″W
- Area: 3.3 acres (1.3 ha)
- Built: 1827
- Architectural style: Italianate, Greek Revival, Federal
- NRHP reference No.: 94000334
- Added to NRHP: April 8, 1994

Wall Spring, also known as Elliott Springs, is a historic mansion on a farm in Gallatin, Tennessee, U.S.. It was a horse farm in the Antebellum Era.

== History ==
The house was built in 1827 for Colonel George Elliott, a veteran of the War of 1812 and the First Seminole War. Elliott bred horses on the farm. He was a co-founder of the Nashville Jockey Club in Nashville, Tennessee in 1807 alongside President Andrew Jackson and Governor Newton Cannon. His brother Charles lived at Walnut Grove nearby. Colonel Elliott died in 1861, and Wall Spring remained in the Elliott family until 1869.

== Architectural significance ==
The house was first designed in the Federal architectural style. It was redesigned in the Italianate and Greek Revival architectural styles in the 1850s. It has been listed on the National Register of Historic Places since April 8, 1994.
