= King Homestead =

Historic house in Tennessee, United States

- U.S. National Register of Historic Places
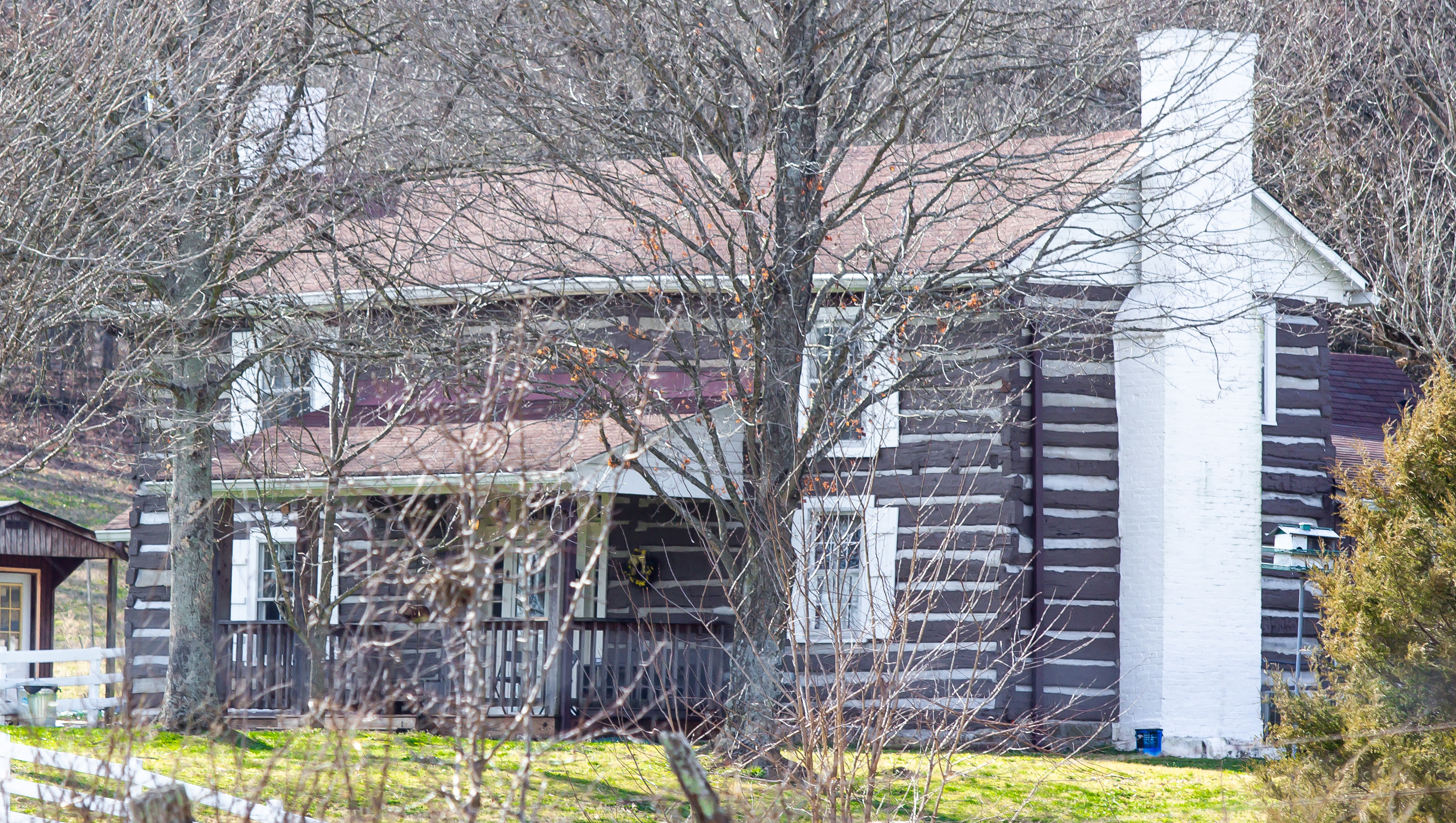

- Location within Tennessee Location within the United States
- Location: About 2 miles (3.2 km) west of Cottontown, Tennessee, off Tennessee State Route 25
- Coordinates: 36°27′6″N 86°34′14″W
- Area: 1 acre (0.40 ha)
- Built: 1796; 230 years ago
- Architect: King, William
- Architectural style: Log house
- NRHP reference No.: 78002640
- Added to NRHP: January 30, 1978

King Homestead, renamed New Moon Farm in 1954, is a log home off Tennessee State Route 25 located near Cottontown, in Sumner County, Tennessee. It was built in 1796 by William King as the first home for himself and his new bride, Caroline Hassell, married on Christmas Day of the same year. The home remained in the King family for one hundred years, and a large farming operation was conducted on the property with the use of up to 30 enslaved people. The property and home were sold numerous times, falling into disrepair. The home has undergone renovation and was placed on the National Register of Historic Places in January 30, 1978.

It was built originally as a single pen log house. In 1978 it was a two-story double pen with its front entrance into an enclosed former dogtrot.
