= Hazel Path =

Historic house in Tennessee, United States

- U.S. National Register of Historic Places
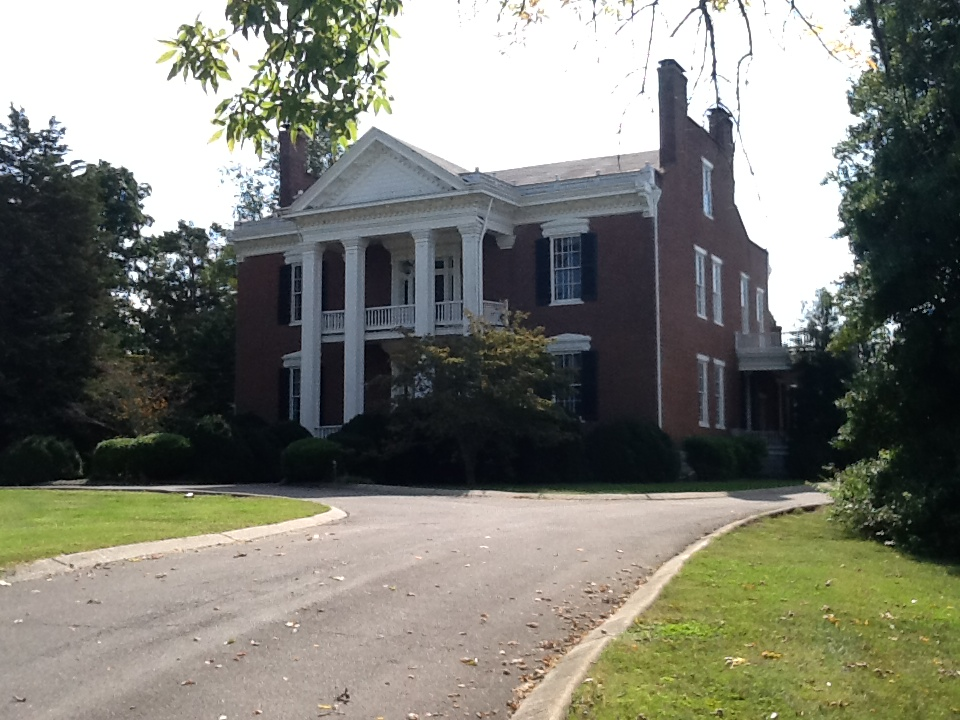

- Location within Tennessee
- Location: 175 E. Main St., Hendersonville, Tennessee
- Coordinates: 36°18′20″N 86°36′25″W
- Area: 2 acres (0.81 ha)
- Built: 1857
- Architectural style: Greek Revival
- NRHP reference No.: 84003713
- Added to NRHP: April 5, 1984

Hazel Path is a historic mansion in Hendersonville, Tennessee, U.S..

The house was built in 1857 for Daniel Smith Donelson, a nephew of U.S. President Andrew Jackson and son-in-law of U.S. Navy Secretary John Branch. Donelson previously lived at the Daniel Smith Donelson House. During the American Civil War of 1861–1865, he served as a major general in the Confederate States Army.

The house was designed in the Greek Revival architectural style. It has been listed on the National Register of Historic Places since April 5, 1984.
