= John W. Head =

American lawyer and politician

John Head

Member-elect of the U.S. House of Representatives from Tennessee's 4th district
- Died before taking office
- Preceded by: John Bright
- Succeeded by: Samuel Fite

Attorney General of Tennessee
- In office 1859–1862
- Governor: Isham G. Harris
- Preceded by: John Sneed
- Succeeded by: Thomas Coldwell

Personal details
- Born: John Waller Head; November 2, 1822 Castalian Springs, Tennessee, U.S.
- Died: November 9, 1874 (aged 52) Gallatin, Tennessee, U.S.
- Party: Democratic

John Waller Head (November 2, 1822 – November 9, 1874) was an American lawyer, legislator, and Tennessee attorney general.

== Background ==
Head was born in Castalian Springs, Tennessee. He was educated in Sumner County, Tennessee. Head studied law and was admitted to the Tennessee bar. He lived in Gallatin, Tennessee and practiced law. Head served in the Tennessee Senate from 1855 to 1857, and was a reporter for the Tennessee Supreme Court from 1858 to 1862. He then served as Tennessee Attorney General from 1858 to 1861. During the American Civil War, Head served in the Confederate Army, as a colonel, in the 30th Tennessee Regiment.

In 1874, Head was elected to the United States House of Representatives from the 4th Tennessee Congressional District. But he died from pneumonia at his home in Gallatin, Tennessee only six days after the election, long before the Congress convened again.

== See also ==
- List of United States representatives-elect who never took their seats

== Notes ==
Legal offices
Preceded by John Sneed	Attorney General of Tennessee; 1859–1862	Succeeded by Thomas Coldwell
U.S. House of Representatives
Preceded by John Bright	Member-elect of the U.S. House of Representatives from Tennessee's 4th congressional district 1874	Succeeded by Samuel Fite
