= Rose Mont =

Historic house in Tennessee, United States

- U.S. National Register of Historic Places
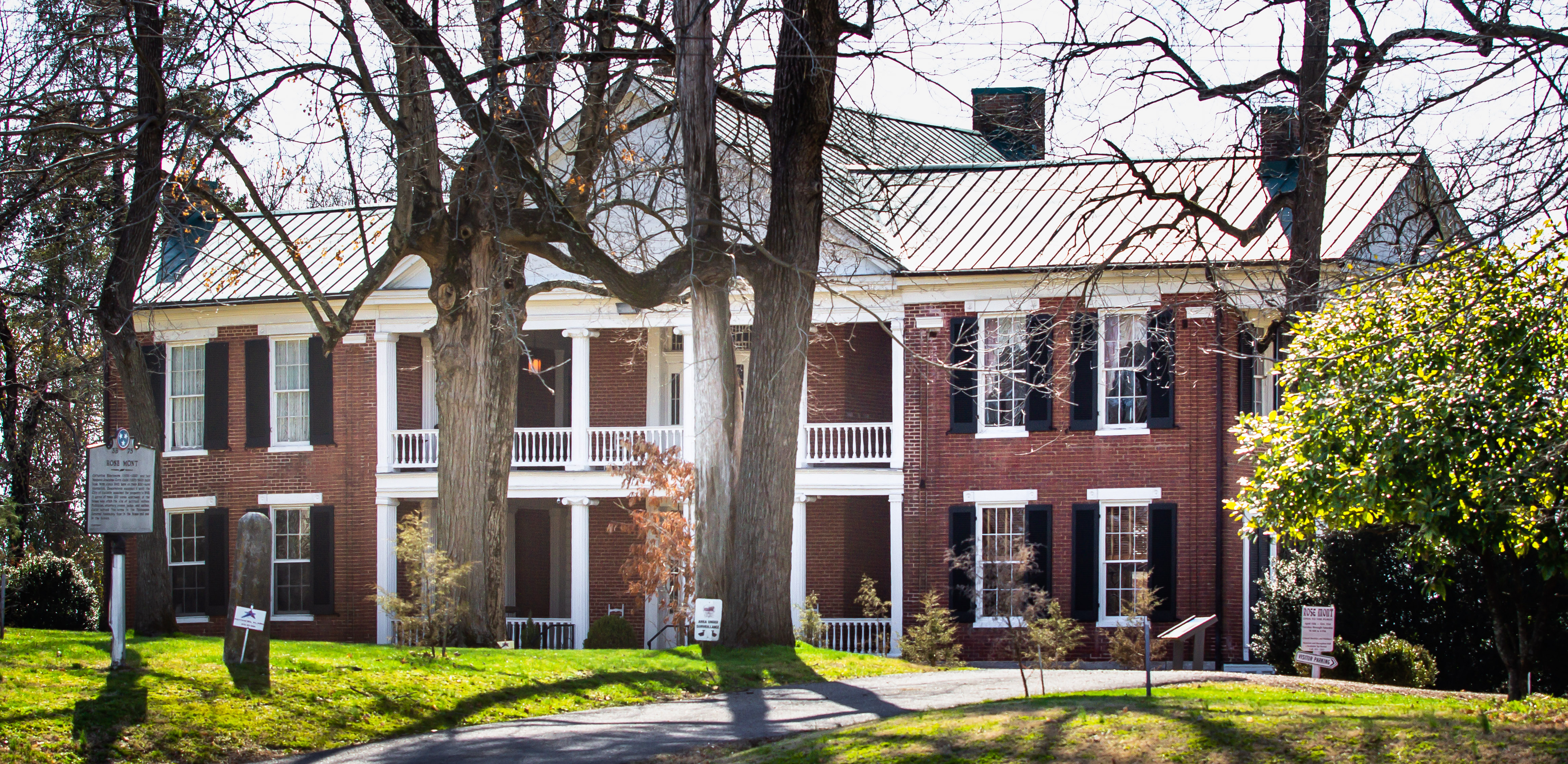

- Location within Tennessee Location within the United States
- Interactive map showing the location of Rose Mont
- Location: 810 S. Water St., Gallatin, Tennessee
- Coordinates: 36°22′35″N 86°26′33″W
- Built: 1842
- Architect: Josephus Conn Guild
- Architectural style: Greek Revival
- NRHP reference No.: 78002641
- Added to NRHP: April 26, 1978

Rose Mont is a Greek Revival style house built in Gallatin, Sumner County, Tennessee, United States. It was built by Judge Josephus Conn Guild for his family, and completed in 1842. Once the site of the area's largest thoroughbred horse farm with 500 acres (2.0 km^{2}), it is now listed on the National Register of Historic Places as Rosemont. In 1993 the property was purchased by the City of Gallatin and the Rose Mont Restoration Foundation. The house is open to the public.

== History ==
Rose Mont was built by Judge Josephus Conn Guild (1802–1883) for his family. It was begun in 1836 and completed in 1842. All of the materials for its construction were obtained on the property.

Rose Mont's architecture is a blend of Greek Revival and Palladian styles. These architectural styles not commonly seen in Middle Tennessee homes of the era, which is typified by Federal or Georgian-style houses with a front entry hall containing a staircase to the second floor. Judge Guild's departure from the local architectural fashions was due to his favorable impression of the Creole-style houses he had seen on frequent trips to Louisiana. Creole elements in Rose Mont include the use of loggias and galleries to connect separate wings, wide porches, open-air halls and staircases, large windows, a raised basement, and an over-hanging roof. The house's main facade employed a classic Italian design by Andrea Palladio, whose influence is seen in the design of many mid-19th century plantation houses in the southern United States.

Rose Mont faces the east, so hot summer sun never falls on the main parlor, keeping it cooler. The name of the house derived from a large rose garden that Judge Guild's wife, Catherine Blackmore Guild (1803–1875), maintained on the north side of the house.

In its early years, the house was the center for a 500-acre (2.0 km^{2}) working farm that raised thoroughbred horses and longhorn cattle. In 1978 it was listed on the National Register of Historic Places under the name "Rosemont". It was occupied by members of the Guild family from its construction until 1993, when it was acquired by the City of Gallatin and the Rose Mont Restoration Foundation.

It is open Tuesdays through Saturdays for guided tours from April 15 through October 31. The mansion and its reception hall are available for rental to the public.

== In popular culture ==
=== Television ===
Rose Mont was featured as a haunted location on the paranormal series, Haunted Live which aired in 2018 on the Travel Channel. The paranormal team, the Tennessee Wraith Chasers investigated reports of 'Nana', an Old Hag entity that attacks visitors to the home.
