= Gallatin Commercial Historic District =

Historic district in Tennessee, United States

- U.S. National Register of Historic Places
- U.S. Historic district
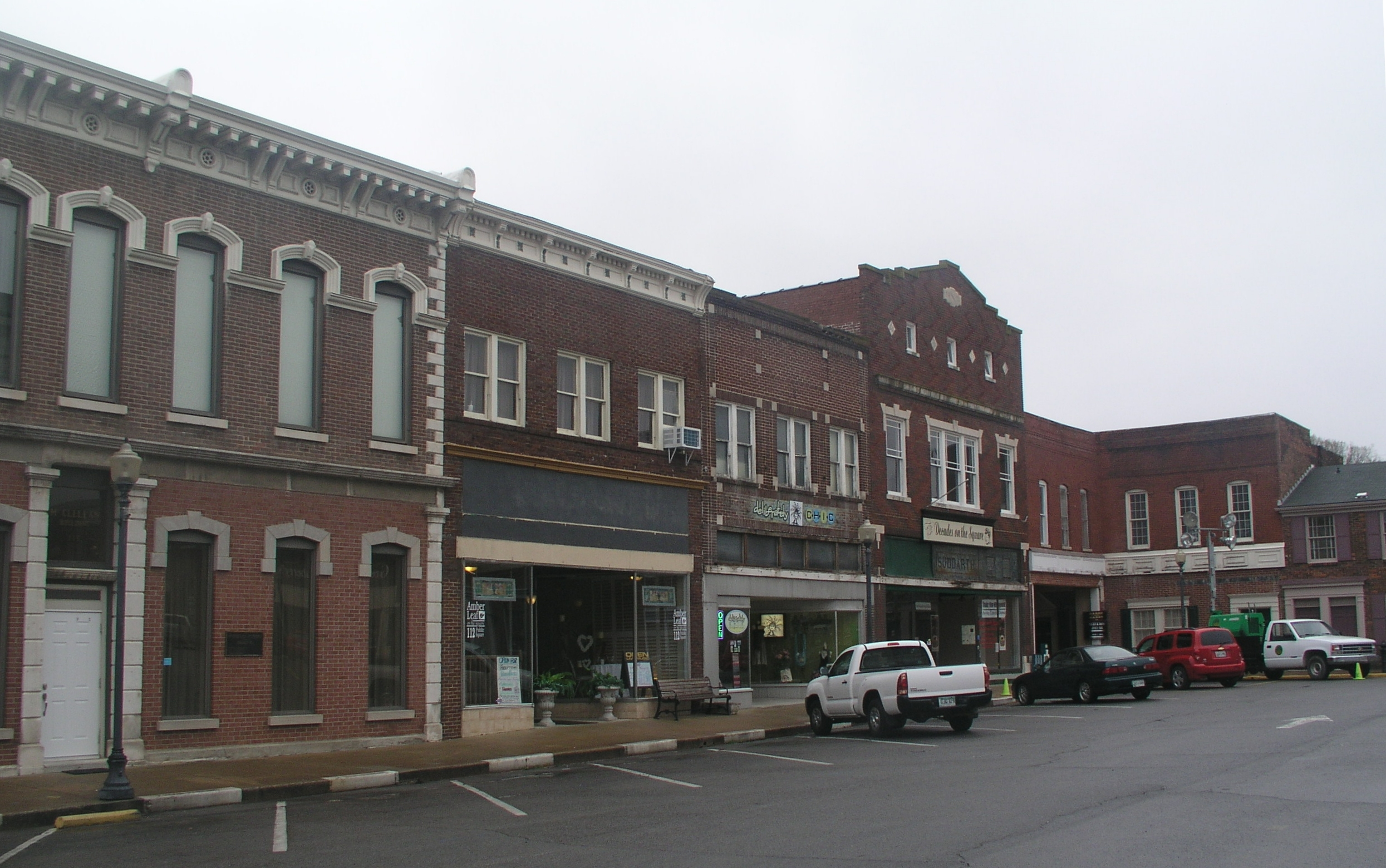

- Location within Tennessee Location within the United States
- Location: Roughly bounded by Town Creek, N. Water Ave. and Boyer and College Sts., E. Main St, and S. Water Ave. and Trimble St., Gallatin, Tennessee
- Coordinates: 36°23′20″N 86°26′43″W
- Area: 24 acres (9.7 ha)
- Architectural style: Gothic Revival; Late Victorian
- NRHP reference No.: 85003369
- Added to NRHP: October 23, 1985

The Gallatin Commercial Historic District is the downtown square area of Gallatin, Sumner County, Tennessee. It was listed as a historic district on the National Register of Historic Places in 1985. The 24 acres (9.7 ha) district included 66 contributing buildings and 22 non-contributing ones.
