= Cottontown, Tennessee =

- Census-designated place
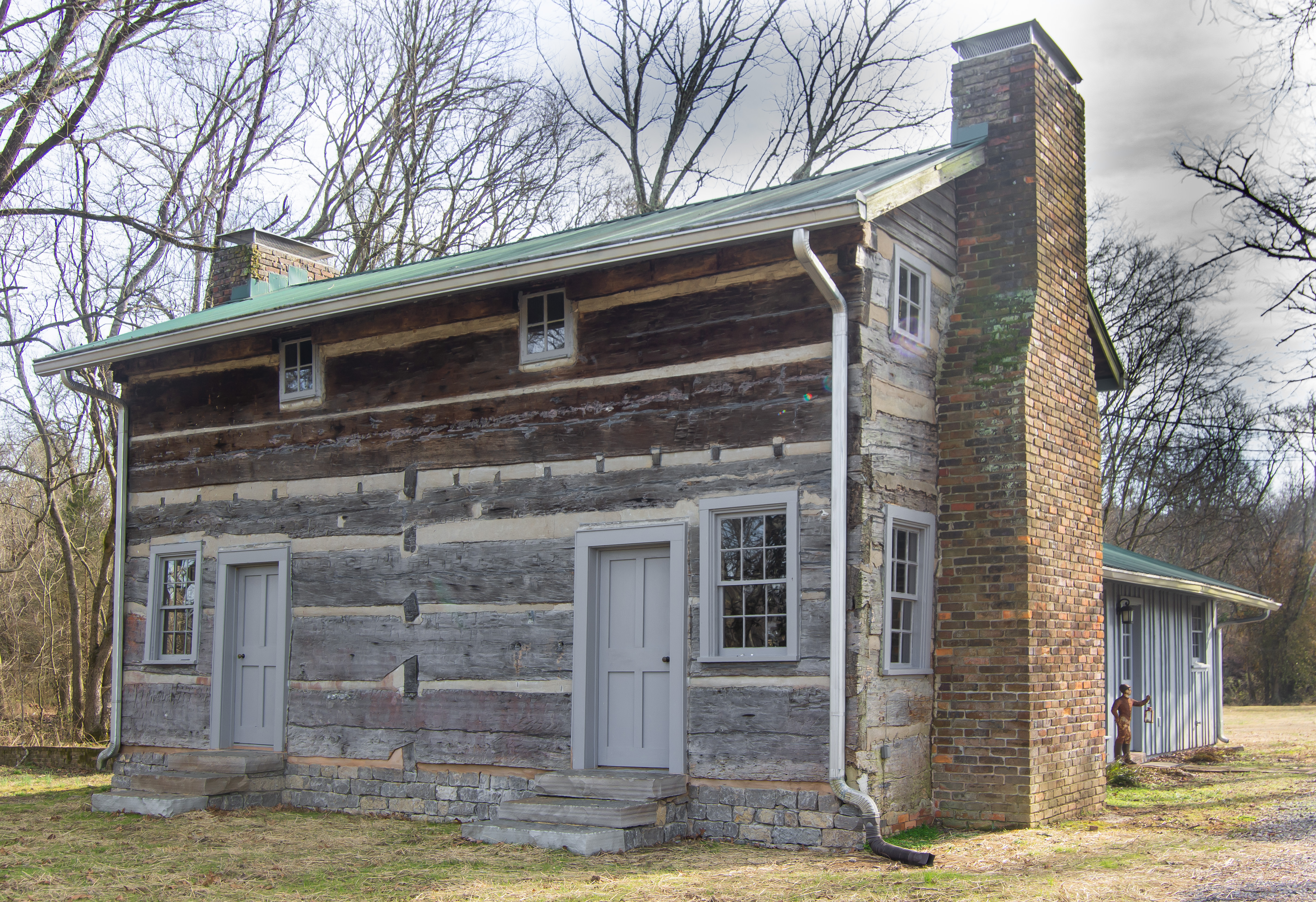
- The Bridal House

- Location within Tennessee
- Coordinates: 36°27′05″N 86°32′17″W
- Country: United States
- State: Tennessee
- County: Sumner, Robertson
- Founded: 1795
- Named after: Capt. Thomas Cotton (1748-1795)

Area
  - Total: 3.51 sq mi (9.09 km^{2})
  - Land: 3.51 sq mi (9.09 km^{2})
  - Water: 0 sq mi (0.00 km^{2})
- Elevation: 571 ft (174 m)

Population (2020)
  - Total: 397
  - Density: 113.1/sq mi (43.67/km^{2})
- Time zone: UTC-6 (Central (CST))
  - Summer (DST): UTC-5 (CDT)
- Area code: 615
- GNIS feature ID: 1281368

Cottontown is an unincorporated community and census-designated place in Sumner and Robertson counties, Tennessee, United States. As of the 2020 census, its population was 370. It is located along State Route 25, northwest of neighboring Gallatin. Cottontown has a post office with ZIP code 37048.

== History ==
=== Native Americans ===
The Cottontown Area was originally inhabited by the Mississippian Culture. One Mississippian site near Cottontown is the Castalian Springs Mound. The Shawnee hunted and traded in the Cumberland River area, but were pushed out by the Cherokee in the early 18th century.

=== Cotton family ===
Cottontown is named for Thomas Cotton (1748–1795), who founded the community in 1795. A Militia Captain from North Carolina, Cotton was one of several settlers rewarded land in the area for service in the Revolutionary War. According to 1792 Sumner County tax records, Cotton owned about 1,280 acres (520 hectares) of land.

== Significant properties ==
- King Homestead
- The Bridal House is a log cabin believed to have been built in 1819. It was built by Moore Carter Cotton for his daughter Elizabeth Frances "Betsy" Cotton (1804–1852) as a bridal gift on the occasion of her marriage to Richard Hobdy (1794–1851). The house is now a historic site preserved by the Tennessee Historical Commission.
