= Bethpage, Tennessee =

- Census-designated place
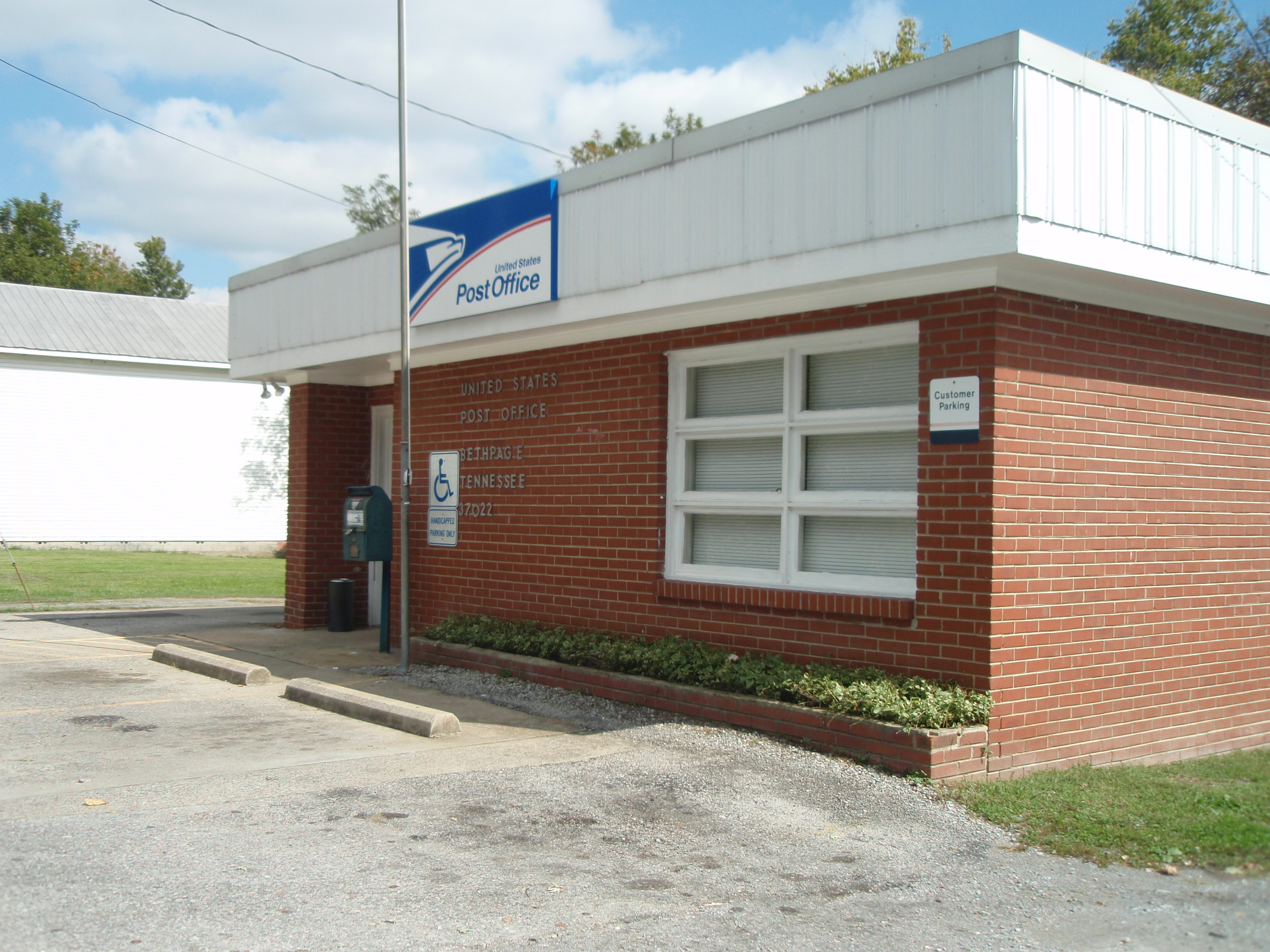
- Post office in Bethpage

- Location within Tennessee
- Coordinates: 36°28′54″N 86°18′43″W
- Country: United States
- State: Tennessee
- County: Sumner

Area
  - Total: 1.33 sq mi (3.44 km^{2})
  - Land: 1.33 sq mi (3.44 km^{2})
  - Water: 0 sq mi (0.00 km^{2})
- Elevation: 545 ft (166 m)

Population (2020)
  - Total: 313
  - Density: 235.6/sq mi (90.98/km^{2})
- Time zone: UTC-6 (Central (CST))
  - Summer (DST): UTC-5 (CDT)
- Area code: 615
- GNIS feature ID: 1277178

Bethpage is an unincorporated community and census-designated place (CDP) in Sumner County, Tennessee, United States. It is located along U.S. Route 31E, northeast of neighboring Gallatin. As of the 2020 census, its population was 313, up from 288 at the 2010 census. The area has its own Post Office. The United States Postal Service ZIP code for the Bethpage area is 37022.

== Demographics ==
Historical population
Census	Pop.	Note	%±
2010	288		—
2020	313		8.7%
U.S. Decennial Census

== Climate ==
Climate data for Bethpage, Tennessee
Month	Jan	Feb	Mar	Apr	May	Jun	Jul	Aug	Sep	Oct	Nov	Dec	Year
Mean daily maximum °F (°C)	46 (8)	49 (9)	59 (15)	69 (21)	77 (25)	86 (30)	88 (31)	88 (31)	83 (28)	71 (22)	60 (16)	48 (9)	25 (−4)
Mean daily minimum °F (°C)	27 (−3)	35 (2)	44 (7)	53 (12)	63 (17)	66 (19)	65 (18)	58 (14)	44 (7)	35 (2)	27 (−3)	45 (7)	36 (2)
Average precipitation inches (mm)	4.4 (110)	4.3 (110)	5.2 (130)	4.5 (110)	5.4 (140)	4 (100)	4.4 (110)	3.4 (86)	3.6 (91)	3.2 (81)	4.3 (110)	5 (130)	51.8 (1,320)
Source: Weatherbase

== See also ==
- Durham's Chapel School
