= Cairo, Sumner County, Tennessee =

Cairo, Tennessee
- Unincorporated community
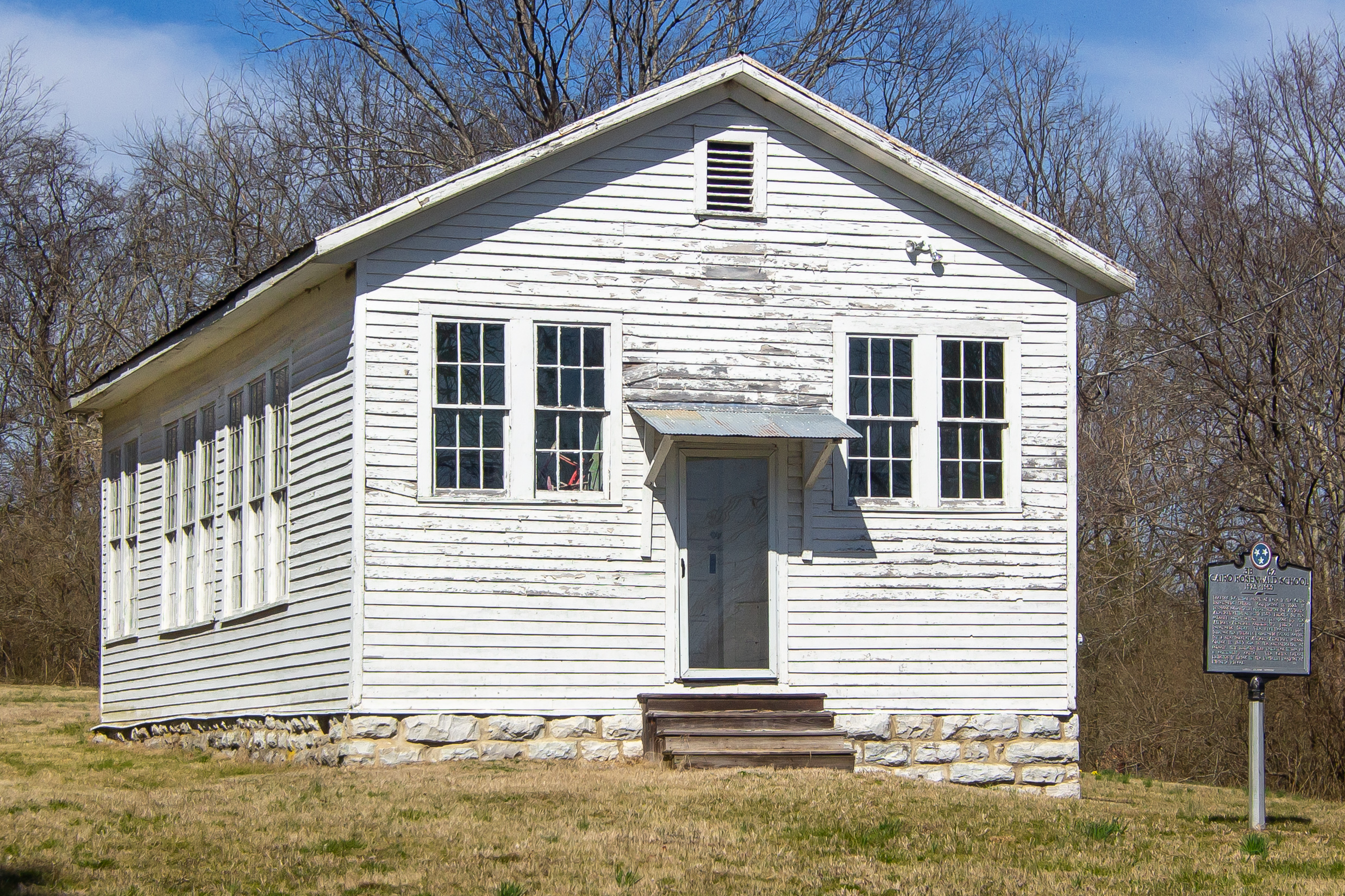
- Cairo Rosenwald School

- Location within Tennessee Location within the United States
- Coordinates: 36°21′39″N 86°21′49″W
- Country: United States
- State: Tennessee
- County: Sumner
- Elevation: 459 ft (140 m)
- Time zone: UTC-6 (Central (CST))
  - Summer (DST): UTC-5 (CDT)
- Area code: 615
- GNIS feature ID: 1279297

Cairo is an unincorporated community in Sumner County, Tennessee.

It is the location of Cairo Rosenwald School, a historic Rosenwald School open during 1923 to 1959 that is listed on the National Register of Historic Places.
