= Gallatin Presbyterian Church =

Historic church in Tennessee, United States

- U.S. National Register of Historic Places
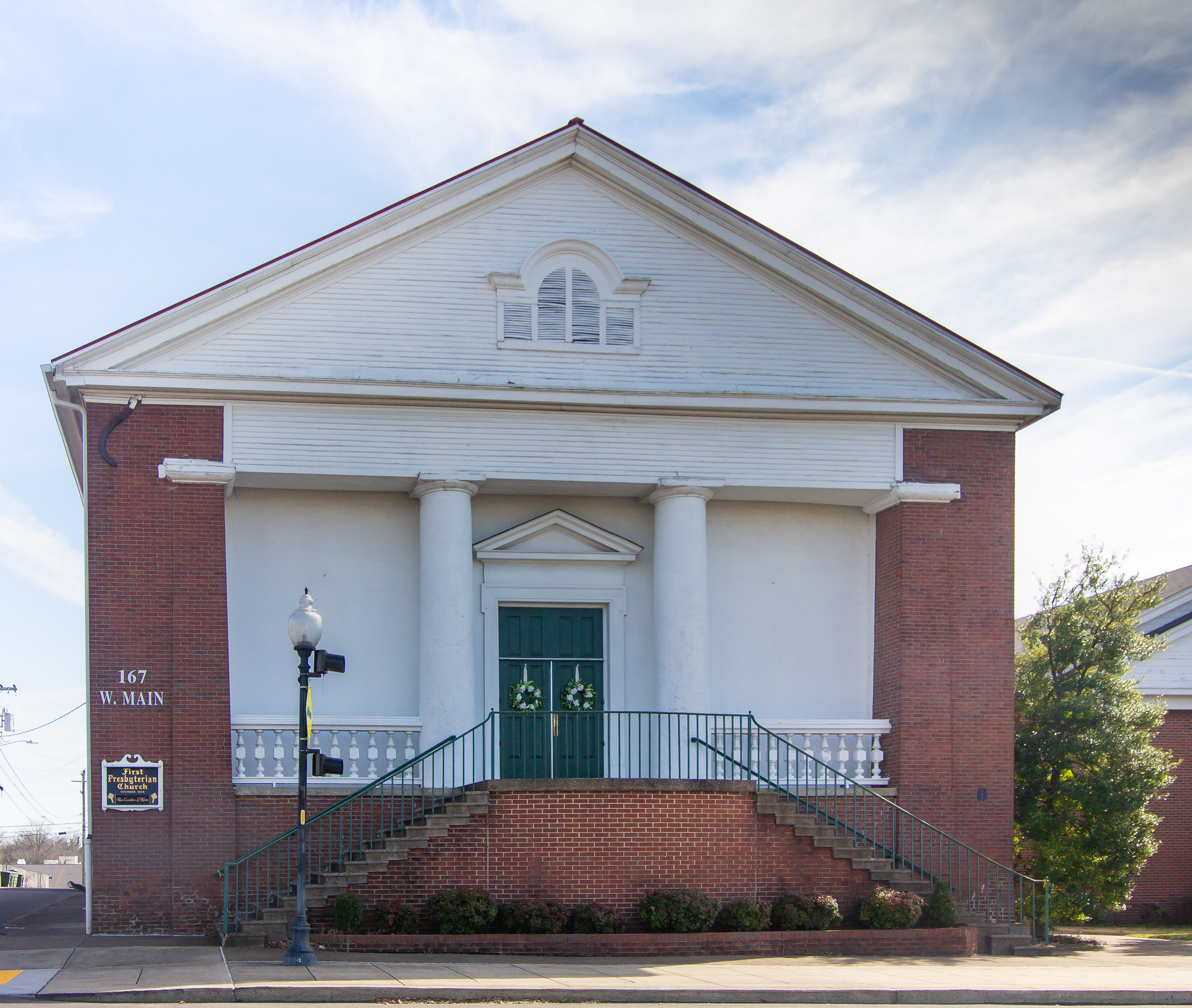

- Location within Tennessee Location within the United States
- Location: 167 W. Main St., Gallatin, Tennessee
- Coordinates: 36°23′14″N 86°26′55″W
- Area: 1.2 acres (0.49 ha)
- Built: 1836
- Architectural style: Greek Revival
- NRHP reference No.: 82004060
- Added to NRHP: March 25, 1982

Gallatin First Presbyterian Church is a historic church in Gallatin, Sumner County, Tennessee, affiliated with Presbyterian Church (USA).

It occupies the oldest church building in Gallatin in continuous existence. The congregation was organized on October 25, 1828. Church construction took place during 1836–1837. It is built in the early Greek Revival architectural style.

The sanctuary was used as a hospital for Federal troops during the Civil War. The same room suffered major fire damage, from an unattended candle, in December 2004. As a result, the sanctuary was gutted and rebuilt over the course of the following year.

The building was listed on the National Register of Historic Places in 1982. It is also registered with the Presbyterian Historical Society of Philadelphia, Pennsylvania, and is designated as an American Presbyterian and Reformed Historical Site.
