= Cairo Rosenwald School =

Historic building in Cairo, Tennessee

- U.S. National Register of Historic Places
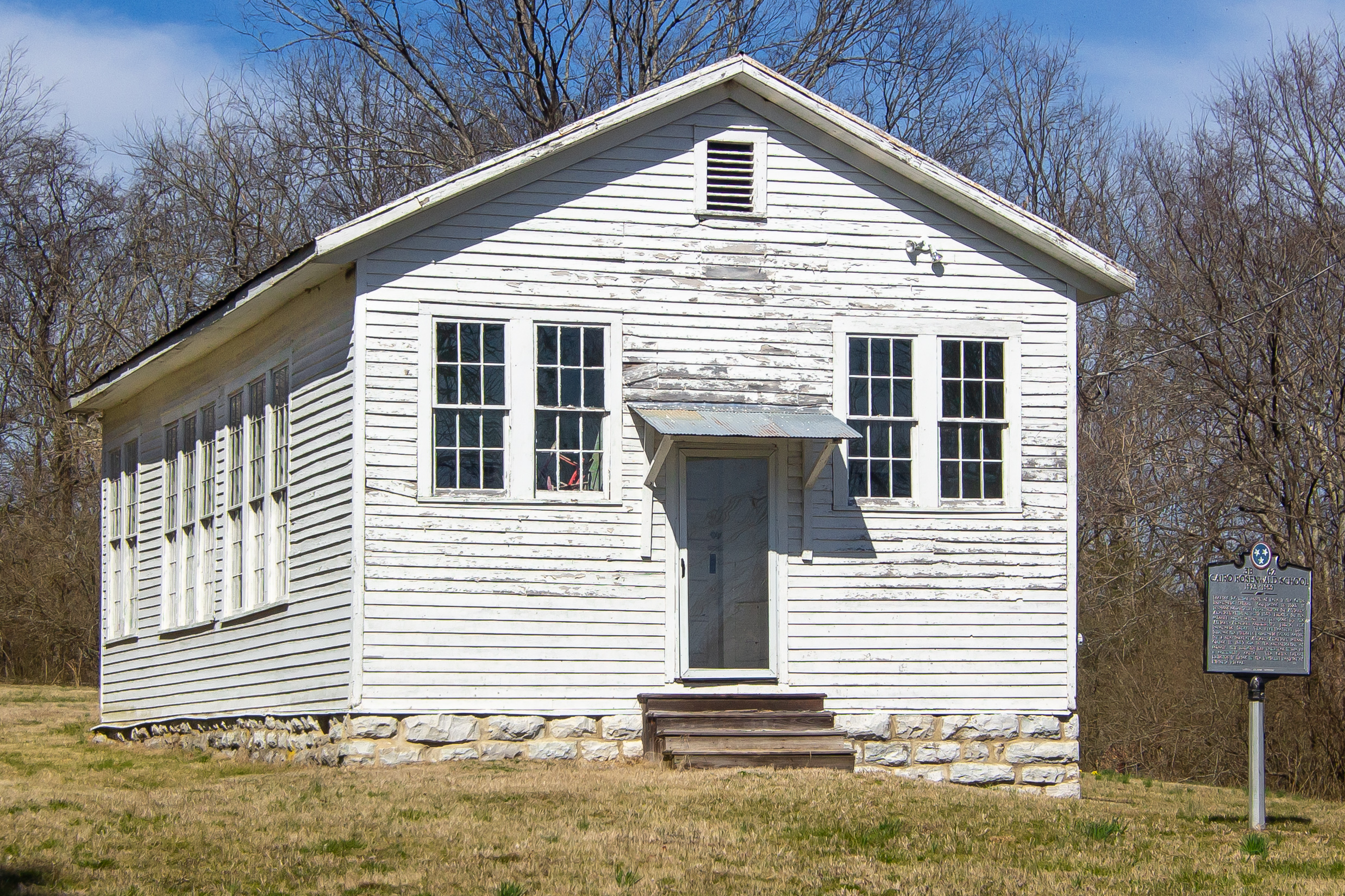

- Location within Tennessee Location within the United States
- Location: Zieglers Fort Rd., approximately 2.5 mi. S of TN 25, Cairo, Tennessee
- Coordinates: 36°21′48″N 86°21′49″W
- Area: 3.7 acres (1.5 ha)
- Built: 1923
- Architect: Julius Rosenwald
- Architectural style: rosenwald school plan
- NRHP reference No.: 96001359
- Added to NRHP: November 15, 1996

Cairo Rosenwald School is a former school for African-American children located in the unincorporated community of Cairo, Sumner County, Tennessee. It was one of seven Rosenwald schools built in the county.

== History ==
Construction of the school began in 1922 and was completed in 1923. The Julius Rosenwald Fund provided $500 toward the construction cost, the African-American community of Cairo raised $700 toward the project cost, and the Tennessee public school fund provided the remaining $700.

The school was built according to a standard design for a one-teacher Rosenwald school. Built on a stone foundation, it has a gable-end entrance and weatherboard siding. Its interior contains one classroom, with two cloak closets on either side of the entrance door and a platform across the end of the building opposite the door. Modernization efforts after World War II included addition of electric wiring and indoor plumbing, resulting in one of the cloak closets being converted to a restroom.

The school was operated until 1959, serving grades 1 through 8. After it closed due to school consolidation, it became a community center. In 1996, it was listed on the National Register of Historic Places due to efforts by the Cairo Improvement Club. The building underwent a major restoration in 2008–2009 under the direction of the Tennessee Preservation Trust and the Middle Tennessee State University Center for Historic Preservation. The restoration project was assisted by a grant award of $46,987 from Lowe's Charitable and Educational Foundation.
