= Castalian Springs, Tennessee =

- Census-designated place
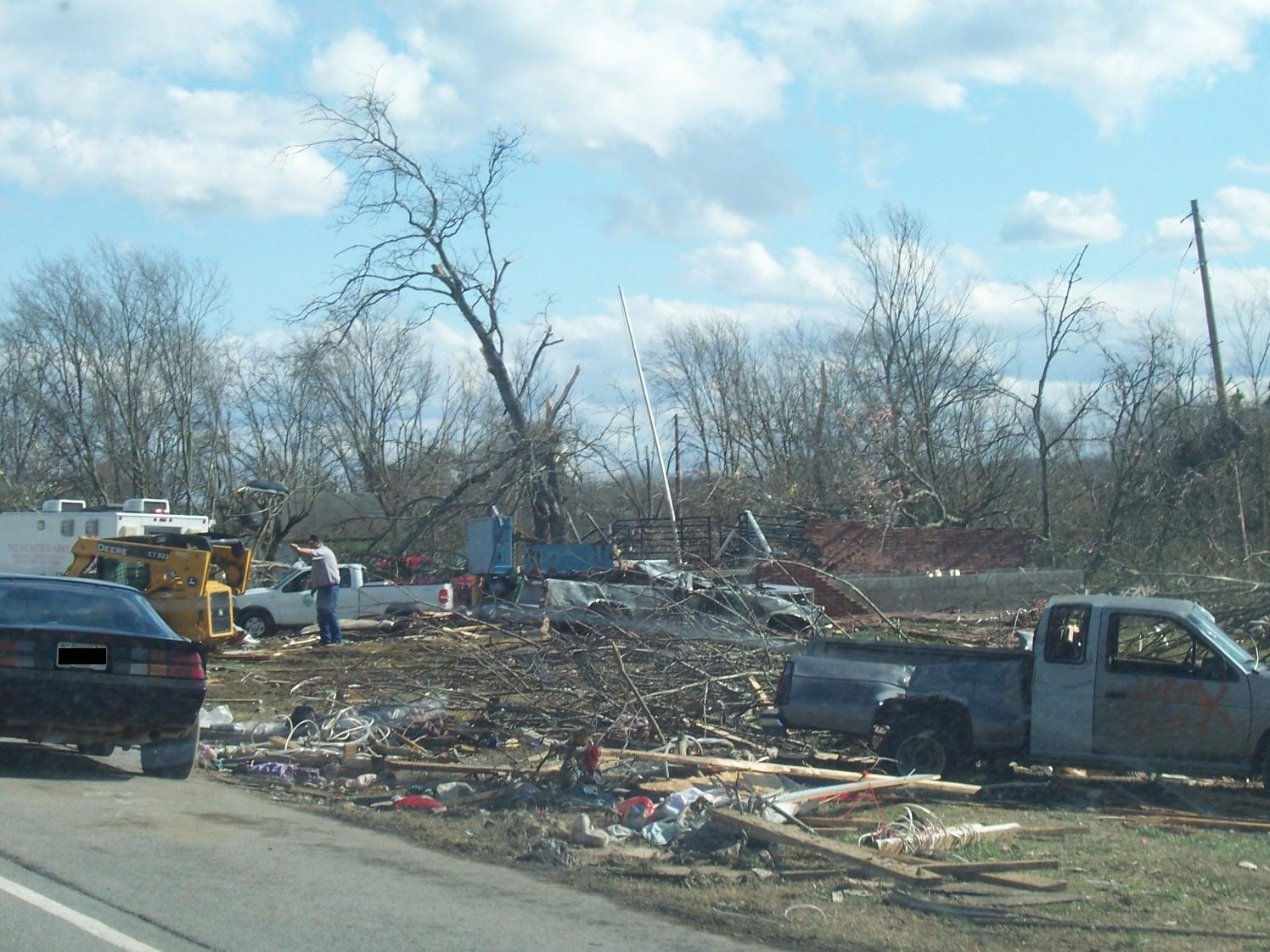
- Post office, destroyed by a tornado, in Castalian Springs, Tennessee, 2008

- Location within Tennessee
- Coordinates: 36°23′37″N 86°18′29″W
- Country: United States
- State: Tennessee
- County: Sumner
- Settled: 1780s
- Named for: The Castalian Spring of ancient Greece

Area
  - Total: 5.82 sq mi (15.07 km^{2})
  - Land: 5.82 sq mi (15.07 km^{2})
  - Water: 0 sq mi (0.00 km^{2})
- Elevation: 495 ft (151 m)

Population (2020)
  - Total: 608
  - Density: 104.5/sq mi (40.35/km^{2})
- Time zone: UTC-6 (Central (CST))
  - Summer (DST): UTC-5 (CDT)
- Area codes: 615 and 629
- GNIS feature ID: 1305723

Castalian Springs is an unincorporated community and census-designated place (CDP) in Sumner County, Tennessee, United States.

== History ==
In the early 19th century, it was known locally as Bledsoe's Lick, and was the location of Bledsoe's Station, a fortified trading post. As of the 2010 census, its population was 556.

=== Native American history ===
During the Mississippian culture period of prehistory, the Castalian Springs Mound Site was a major local earthwork mound center, built and occupied from about 950 into the 14th century. The Native Americans who built and occupied the complex site preceded the historic tribes later known to European-American settlers in the area. This was one of the sites constructed throughout the Mississippi Valley and its tributaries, connecting regions from the Great Lakes to the Gulf of Mexico.

The site was first excavated in the 1890s. It was excavated professionally in the 2005 to 2010 archaeological field school led by Dr. Kevin E. Smith from Middle Tennessee State University. A number of important finds have been associated with the site, most particularly several examples of Mississippian stone statuary and the "Castalian Springs shell gorget," now held by the National Museum of the American Indian.

=== 2008 Super Tuesday tornado ===
In the 2008 Super Tuesday tornado outbreak of February 5–6, the tiny village was hit by a strong tornado (an EF3) that claimed seven lives. The historic structure Wynnewood was heavily damaged by the storm and the United States post office was destroyed. Castalian Springs captured national news headlines when an 11-month-old boy, Kyson Stowell, was found alive in the debris of his house. Originally thought to be a children's doll, the boy moved just slightly, and rescuer David Harmon noticed the movement. He had been blown 150 yards from the house. Kyson's mother had shielded him but died in the storm.

== Demographics ==
Historical population
Census	Pop.	Note	%±
2020	608		—
U.S. Decennial Census

== Geography ==
Castalian Springs is located along Tennessee State Route 25, about 7 miles (11 km) east of Gallatin.

== Post office ==
The area has its own United States post office, designated by the ZIP code 37031.

== Notable sites ==
- Wynnwood State Historic Site – historic inn located in Castalian Springs.
- Bledsoe's Fort Historical Park – public park that protects the site of the 18th-century Bledsoe's Station and several other historic structures
- Cragfont State Historic Site – A historic home and the former home of James Winchester

== Notable natives and residents ==
- William B. Bate, a governor of Tennessee, U.S. Senator, and Confederate major general in the American Civil War
- Humphrey Bate, an early Grand Ole Opry string band leader
- A. M. Burton, insurance company founder and philanthropist
- Edward W. Carmack, a U.S. Senator for Tennessee and an early editor of The Tennessean.
- William Hall, who served briefly as Governor of Tennessee in 1829.
- John W. Head, Tennessee Attorney General and state senator
