= Roper's Knob Fortifications =

- U.S. National Register of Historic Places
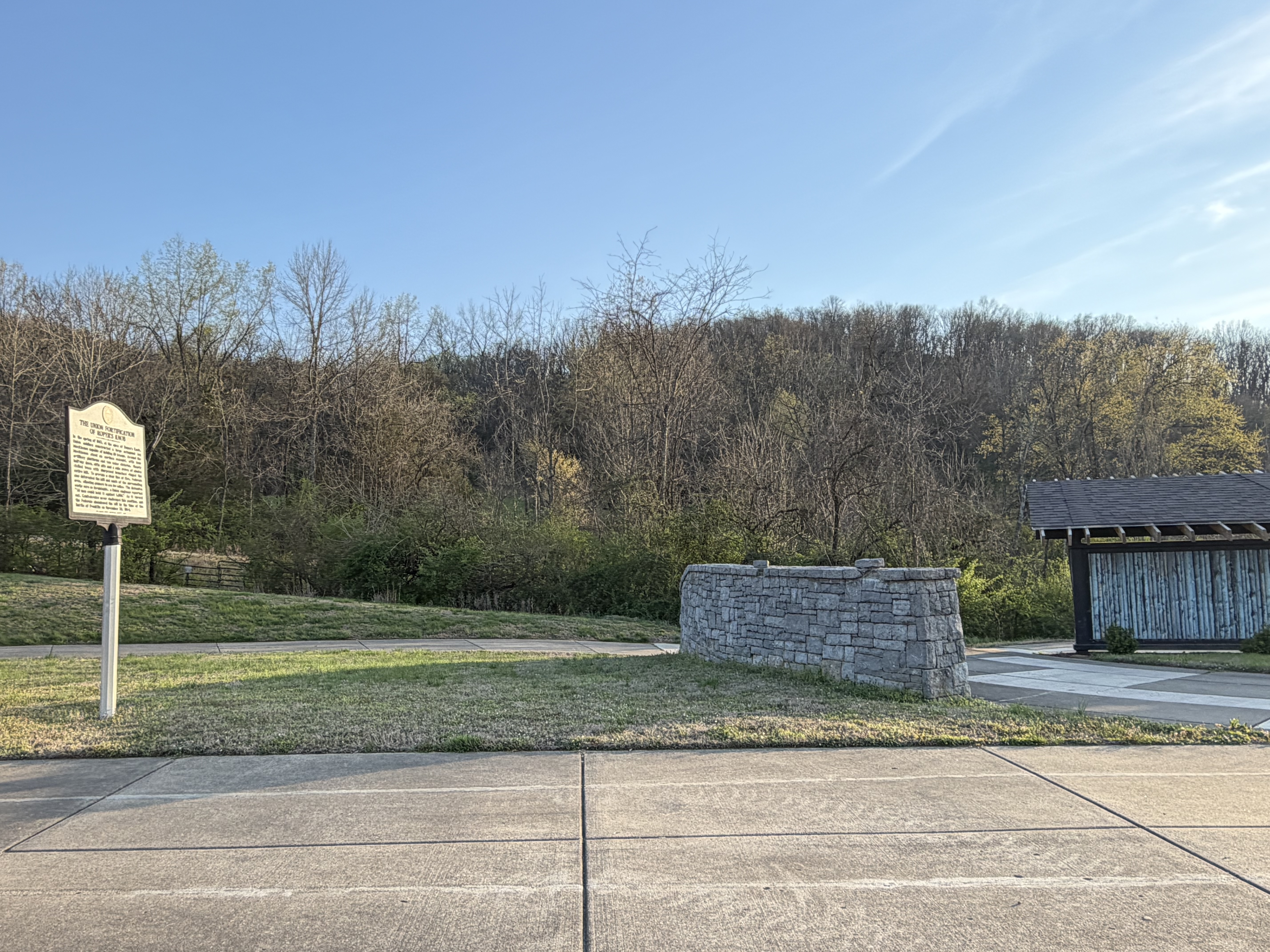
- A historical marker notes the site of the fortifications

- Location within Tennessee Location within the United States
- Location: Off Liberty Pike, Franklin, Tennessee
- Coordinates: 35°56′32″N 86°50′33″W
- Area: 58.4 acres (23.6 ha)
- Built: 1863
- MPS: Civil War Historic and Historic Archeological Resources in Tennessee MPS
- NRHP reference No.: 00000353
- Added to NRHP: April 6, 2000

Roper's Knob Fortifications were constructed by Union Army forces between February and May 1863 in Franklin, Tennessee. According to Tennessee Archaeology, "Roper's Knob served as part of a chain of signal stations that provided a communications link from Franklin to Murfreesboro. Additionally the knob had a large redoubt capable of holding four large artillery pieces, a blockhouse, cisterns, and a magazine. ... "

Artillery at Fort Granger, another fortification in Franklin, played a role in the November 1864 Battle of Franklin, but it is believed that Roper's Knob was not then occupied. It is nonetheless believed that artillery had at some point been hoisted into the fortification, in part on the archeological evidence of an artillery fuse found there, but was removed in 1864 when the battlefronts moved south. The area was investigated by an archeological dig in 2000.

A letter written by a 22nd Wisconsin soldier - Herman L. Cunningham - on June 28, 1863, from atop Roper's Knob, reveals in part, "Company H, K, & G occupy a Knob about three hundred feet high, with breastworks, stockade, and 125 pounder (cannon). The rest of the Regiment is over to the other fort [Fort Granger] 3/4 of a mile from here, that and the 85th Indiana command this post." The letter header says "Roper's Knob, Franklin."

In a study of Civil War Historic and Historic Archeological Resources in Tennessee, it is noted that Winstead Hill, Fort Granger, the Carter House, and Carnton comprise the Franklin Battlefield National Historic Landmark area, but Roper's Knob is not included. The document describes criteria for listing of fortifications on the National Register of Historic Places which applied to the later Roper's Knob nomination. The property was listed on the National Register of Historic Places in 2000. The listing was for an area of 58.4 acres (23.6 ha).
