= Most Terrifying Places in America =

American documentary television series

- Genre: Paranormal; Documentary
- Written by: Jeff Rotter
- Directed by: Anthony Kraus
- Narrated by: Mason Pettit
- Composer: Audio Network
- Country of origin: United States
- Original language: English
- No. of episodes: seven parts

Production
- Executive producer: Matt Sharp
- Producers: Alison Mouledoux; Rebecca Bruno; Deena Lysadt Greiner; Katie Iger; Glenn Waldman
- Editors: Mark C. Burns; Keith Krimbel; Sherman Lau; Daniel Lerner; Barney J. Schmidt
- Camera setup: Multiple-camera
- Running time: 60 minutes
- Production company: Sharp Entertainment

Original release
- Network: Travel Channel
- Release: October 9, 2009 – October 28, 2018

Most Terrifying Places in America is an American paranormal documentary television series that premiered on October 9, 2009, on the Travel Channel as a stand-alone special. The special was subsequently broken down into an episodic series. Each episode featured the legends and stories of several reportedly haunted locations throughout America.

In October 2018, a five-episode special series aired on the Travel Channel which gave the show episode titles instead of numbered volumes.

== Synopsis ==
The series is narrated by Mason Pettit. Each episode start off showing haunted "hotspots" on a map of the United States. A particular haunted location is then selected by each of the series' "ghost hunters", and investigated by them and their team. Paranormal investigators, historians, psychics, and mediums all present commentary on these sites. Historical footage is often shown, and any eyewitnesses interviewed. The show reports on the paranormal as told from purported personal encounters with the supernatural. At the beginning of each episode, a parental advisory is shown: "Warning: What you are about to see may be too extreme for the young, the impressionable, and the faint of heart. Parental discretion is advised."

== Series overview ==
No.	Part	Title	Airdate
	1	Most Terrifying Places in America 1	October 9, 2009
	2	Most Terrifying Places in America 2	October 9, 2009
	3	Most Terrifying Places in America 3	October 1, 2010
	4	Most Terrifying Places in America 4	October 1, 2010
	5	Most Terrifying Places in America 5	October 8, 2010
	6	Most Terrifying Places in America 6	October 15, 2010
	7	Most Terrifying Places in America 7	October 22, 2010

== Specials ==
Each episode tells the tales of haunted locations, which are reportedly haunted by the supernatural

=== Part 1 (Special) ===
Part	Title	Original Airdate
1	Most Terrifying Places in America 1	October 9, 2009
Locations	Stanley Hotel, Estes Park, Colorado; Ohio State Reformatory, Mansfield, Ohio; Lincoln Theater, Decatur, Illinois; Myrtles Plantation, St. Francisville, Louisiana; Waverly Hills Sanitorium, Louisville, Kentucky; St. Louis Cemetery No. 1, New Orleans, Louisiana; Axe Murder House, Villisca, Iowa	
Overview	In this one-hour special premiere, the episode tells the tales of seven haunted locations, which are reportedly haunted by the supernatural.	

=== Part 2 (Special) ===
Part	Title	Original Airdate
2	Most Terrifying Places in America 2	October 9, 2009
Locations	Shanghai Tunnels, Portland, Oregon; Old Town Tatu (haunted tattoo parlor), Chicago, Illinois; Lemp Mansion, St Louis, Missouri; Bobby Mackey's Music World, Wilder, Kentucky; Winchester Mystery House, San Jose, California; The Whaley House, San Diego, California; Clinton Road, West Milford, New Jersey	
Overview	In the second one-hour special, the episode tells the tales of seven more haunted locations, which are reportedly haunted by the supernatural.	

=== Part 3 (Special) ===
Part	Title	Original Airdate
3	Most Terrifying Places in America 3	October 1, 2010
Locations	Cheesman Park, Denver, Colorado; Fort Mifflin, Philadelphia, Pennsylvania; The Devil's Tree, Bernards Township, New Jersey; Manresa Castle, Port Townsend, Washington; Slater Mill, Pawtucket, Rhode Island; Archer Avenue, Justice, Illinois; Stone's Public House, Ashland, Massachusetts; Lizzie Borden Bed and Breakfast, Fall River, Massachusetts	
Overview	In the third one-hour special, the episode tells the tales of eight haunted locations, which are reportedly haunted by the supernatural.	

=== Part 4 (Special) ===
Part	Title	Original Airdate
4	Most Terrifying Places in America 4	October 1, 2010
Locations	Liar's Club, Chicago, Illinois; Watseka Wonder (Roff Family Homestead), Watseka, Illinois; Manteno State Hospital, Manteno, Illinois; Miss Molly's Bed & Breakfast, Fort Worth, Texas; Georgetown Castle, Seattle, Washington; USS Lexington Museum, Corpus Christi, Texas; Oak Alley Plantation, Vacherie, Louisiana; Cohoes Music Hall, Cohoes, New York	
Overview	In the fourth one-hour special, the episode tells the tales of eight more haunted locations, which are reportedly haunted by the supernatural.	

=== Part 5 (Special) ===
Part	Title	Original Airdate
5	Most Terrifying Places in America 5	October 8, 2010
Locations	Lake Shawnee Amusement Park, Lake Shawnee, West Virginia; Sorrel Weed House, Savannah, Georgia; Mount Misery, Long Island, Huntington, New York; Whispers Estate Bed & Breakfast, Mitchell, Indiana; Stepney Cemetery, Monroe, Connecticut; St. Augustine Lighthouse, St. Augustine, Florida; Willard Library, Evansville, Indiana; Jerome Grand Hotel, Jerome, Arizona; Presidio La Bahia, Goliad, Texas	
Overview	In the fifth one-hour special, the episode tells the tales of nine haunted locations, which are reportedly haunted by the supernatural.	

=== Part 6 (Special) ===
Part	Title	Original Airdate
6	Most Terrifying Places in America 6	October 15, 2010
Locations	Mineral Springs Hotel, Alton, Illinois; Lake Ronkonkoma, Long Island, New York; Morse Mill Hotel, Morse Mill, Missouri; Lotz House, Franklin, Tennessee; Holly Hotel, Holly, Michigan; Burlington County Prison, Mount Holly, New Jersey; St. Paul's Church, Key West, Florida; Hull House, Chicago, Illinois	
Overview	In the sixth one-hour special, the episode tells the tales of eight haunted locations, which are reportedly haunted by the supernatural.	

=== Part 7 (Special) ===
Part	Title	Original Airdate
7	Most Terrifying Places in America 7	October 22, 2010
Locations	Route 44, Rehoboth, Massachusetts; Octagon Hall, Franklin, Kentucky; Orpheum Theatre, Memphis, Tennessee; Bachelor's Grove Cemetery, Midlothian, Illinois; Cincinnati Music Hall, Cincinnati, Ohio; Marjim Manor, Appleton, New York; Captain Grant's Inn, Preston, Connecticut; White Eagle Saloon & Hotel, Portland, Oregon; One If By Land, Two If By Sea Restaurant, New York City, New York	
Overview	In the seventh one-hour special, the episode tells the tales of nine haunted locations, which are reportedly haunted by the supernatural.	

== Special ==
A Halloween special named Most Terrifying Places in America: Top 13 aired on Friday October 29, 2010. This special episode counted-down the 13 most terrifying places from past episodes.

Title	Original Air Date
Most Terrifying Places in America: Top 13	October 29, 2010
Haunted Locations	13 The Devil's Tree, Bernards Township, New Jersey; 12 Manteno State Hospital, Manteno, Illinois; 11 Slater Mill Pawtucket, Rhode Island; 10 Lake Shawnee Amusement Park, Lake Shawnee, West Virginia; 9 Georgetown Castle, Seattle, Washington; 8 Orpheum Theater, Memphis, Tennessee; 7 Cheesman Park, Denver, Colorado; 6 Morse Mill Hotel, Morse Mill, Missouri; 5 Fort Mifflin, Philadelphia, Pennsylvania; 4 Whispers Estate Bed & Breakfast, Mitchell, Indiana; 3 Liar's Club, Chicago, Illinois; 2 Lotz House, Franklin, Tennessee; 1 Lake Ronkonkoma, Long Island, New York

== Episodes ==
Ep. #	Episode Title	Original Airdate
1.1	Haunted Roadtrips	September 30, 2018
Locations	Ernestine & Hazel's Bar, Memphis, Tennessee; Old Man Stuckey's Bridge, Meridian, Mississippi; Marshall House, Savannah, Georgia; Donner Lake, Donner Memorial State Park, Truckee, California; "The Dead Zone", Interstate 4, Lake Monroe, Florida; Crescent Hotel, Eureka Springs, Arkansas	
Overview	This episode tells the tales of the open road by exploring terrifying roadside attractions and the haunted roads less traveled that will make drivers want to lock their doors and roll up their windows. A Memphis juke joint that featured blues and a brothel, an old bridge in Mississippi where a murderer was hanged for his crimes, Savannah's oldest operating hotel built before to the Civil War that was used as a hospital for amputations, a ghostly lake that tells the tale of what really happened to the Donner Party, Florida's highway to hell locals call the 'Dead Zone' and an Arkansas hotel that was operated as a cancer hospital run by a charlatan.	
1.2	Cursed Towns	October 7, 2018
Locations	New Orleans Pharmacy Museum, New Orleans, Louisiana; The Black Veil Tattoo Studio, (former Odd Fellows lodge), Beverly, Massachusetts; The Christmas Shootout of 1927, (Cedar Avenue and 3rd Street) South Pittsburg, Tennessee; Emily's Bridge, Stowe, Vermont; West Virginia State Penitentiary, Moundsville, West Virginia; Fort Knox, Prospect, Maine	
Overview	The episode ventures into towns across America that are reportedly haunted by their dark pasts. A museum dedicated to experimental medicine located in America's first apothecary is haunted by the spirit of a sadistic doctor, a tattoo parlor that was formally home to a secretly odd organization, a dangerous intersection in Tennessee which was the site of a deadly shoot out, an infamous bridge in Vermont where a heart-broken teenage girl leaped to her death, a prison near an ancient burial ground that its inmates believed cursed them to stay there for all eternity, and a Revolutionary War fort where visitors report the ghosts of long-dead soldiers still march on the grounds.	
1.3	Devil's Playground	October 14, 2018
Locations	The Clown Motel, Tonopah Cemetery, Tonopah, Nevada; "Annabelle", Warrens' Occult Museum, Monroe, Connecticut; Bonnie Springs Ranch, Blue Diamond, Nevada; Glenwood Cemetery, True Addiction Tattoo Studio, Yazoo, Mississippi; The Strand Cinema, Skowhegan, Maine; Fear Factory SLC (former Portland Cement Co. factory), Salt Lake City, Utah	
Overview	This episode explores scary attractions across the nation: a motel next to a cemetery that's a Coulrophobia's worst nightmare, a morbid museum that houses haunted artifacts like a demonic Raggedy Ann doll, an old western ranch with a 19th-century schoolhouse that's reportedly haunted by a schoolmarm and her students, a historic Mississippi town that locals claim is cursed by a witch who killed its citizens, a movie theater in Maine where a sorrowful woman starred in her own horror film when she leaped off the theater's balcony to her death, and a sinister cement factory-turned-haunted attraction that scares its patrons with real ghosts.	
1.4	Restless Dead	October 21, 2018
Locations	St. Augustine Lighthouse, St. Augustine, Florida; Madison Seminary, Madison, Ohio; Squirrel Cage Jail, Council Bluffs, Iowa; David Whitney Mansion, Detroit, Michigan; The Speakeasy (former General Store), Sacramento, Nebraska; Smallwood Store, Chokoloskee, Florida	
Overview	This episode features locations where the restless souls of the dead never sleep. A Florida lighthouse that's filled with darkness of those who died there, a former Victorian-era asylum for women where the insane were experimented on, one of the few remaining Rotary Jails where inmates tried to escape by severing their limbs, a majestic mansion in Detroit built by a lumber baron is claimed to be haunted by his two wives, a restaurant that was once a remote outpost in Nebraska where a scorned woman killed her unfaithful husband is reportedly haunted by a ghost called "Faceless Fred", and a small country store in the Florida Everglades is the site of a deadly shootout of a bloody outlaw who hid his victims in the swampy waters.	
1.5	Unnatural World	October 28, 2018
Locations	Seven Sisters Road, Nebraska City, Nebraska; Bennington Triangle, Glastenbury, Bennington County, Vermont; Hinsdale House, Hinsdale, New York; Colorado Grande Hotel and Casino, Cripple Creek, Colorado; Pierce Mansion, Gardner, Massachusetts; Wildwood Sanitarium, Salamanca, New York	
Overview	This episode explores supernatural locations linked to terrifying tales. A ghostly road in Nebraska where local legend suggests a farmer hanged his entire family that included seven daughters and his wife, a mysterious forest where hikers reportedly vanish without a trace, an Upstate New York farmhouse where it's claimed a demon resides, a creepy mining town in Colorado that was once called 'the wickedest town' in America, a New England Victorian-style mansion where its former owners possesses the living tenants, and a former sanitarium that performed medical experiments with electricity to cure its patients' ailments.	

== See also ==
- List of ghost films
