= Indian Burial Ground (novel) =

2024 horror novel by Nick Medina

- Author: Nick Medina
- Language: English
- Genre: Horror
- Publisher: Berkley Books
- Publication date: 16 Apr 2024
- Publication place: United States
- Pages: 384 (hardcover)
- ISBN: 9780593546888
- Preceded by: Sisters of the Lost Nation

Indian Burial Ground is a 2024 horror novel by American author Nick Medina.

== Plot ==
In the present day, Noemi lives on the Takoda reservation in Louisiana. Her boyfriend Roddy is killed after being struck by a car; it is unclear if this was a suicide or an accidental death. That day, Noemi's uncle Louie returns to the reservation for the first time since she was a child. Throughout the day, Louie discusses his reasons for returning and tells Noemi about the events of 1986.

In 1986, Louie is a teenager and in the previous years several tragedies took place at the reservation. A young man named Horace Saucier was rumored to have killed the entire Hensley family before he himself was murdered. Local legend links Horace to the Takoda Vampire, which frightens many of the young people on the reservation. Louie often babysits the young Noemi as well as a boy named Johnny. Louie's mother Mae is an alcoholic who is unable to parent effectively, but his Grandpa Joe is a stable role model. Louie is slowly growing apart from his childhood friend Jean-Luc, further complicating his life.

Three graves, including that of Horace Saucier, are desecrated. A local man named Aubrey dies. At his wake, Aubrey's body sits up and several mourners hear him speak. A woman named Miss Shelby disappears, and many suspect she fell into the river and drowned. Her son Ern is morbidly obese and homebound. Local townspeople begin to care for Ern. Ern teaches Louie about traditional Takoda myths during their conversations.

An elderly woman drowns in a septic tank. Her body also sits upright at her wake, and Louie hears the corpse speak. Various dead animals including an armadillo and a woodpecker come back to life. Johnny runs away from Louie and Jean-Luc. Johnny falls into a burning trash pit and dies. At Johnny's wake, his mother Rosie attacks Louie. They knock the casket over. Johnny's corpse sits up and tells Louie “Noemi’s next.”

Louie discovers that Jean-Luc desecrated the graves, hoping to gain power from their spirits. Louie decides not to turn him in. Noemi is possessed by an evil spirit called the Meli Omahka, which is related to an alligator from the Takoda origin myth. She bites Louie and the spirit transfers to him. He becomes an alligator. Louie performs a traditional warrior dance and becomes human again.

Ern reveals that he killed the Hensleys, throwing the reservation out of balance and causing the Meli Omahka to appear. He allowed Horace to take the blame for the death of the Hensleys and then killed him. Finally, Ern killed his mother Shelby and hid her body. The Meli Omahka began possessing children, animals, and elderly people; Louie was the first victim to have enough strength to fight back effectively. Ern is arrested for his crimes.

Back in the present day, Noemi discusses Roddy's death with his sister Sara. She learns that Roddy was not taking his prescribed Zoloft and that his death may have truly been a suicide. Louie argues with Jean-Luc and Rosie, but eventually hopes that they can forgive each other. Louie and Noemi discuss their experiences with death and begin therapy. Louie decides that he may remain on the reservation.

== Background ==
In an interview with The Nerd Daily, Medina discussed several inspirations for the story. He reported that an article from 2012 in which a toddler supposedly sat up in his coffin and spoke inspired a story that eventually became Indian Burial Ground. Medina was also inspired by the issues of alcoholism and suicide that are prominent issues with Native American communities.

== Reception ==
A review by Jennifer Embree in Library Journal praised Medina's characters, stating that he "consistently manages to humanize his characters even as readers witness their most monstrous moments." The review concludes that the novel is "another atmospheric, unsettling, and downright eerie read that will keep readers guessing until the last page." Writing for Booklist, Becky Spratford stated that "the story moves fluidly between past and present, enhancing the unease and layering the dread, allowing readers to feel the reverberations of both horrible secrets and reservation life over time." Stratford stated the novel "entertains without shying away from a direct portrayal of the generational trauma experienced by marginalized people".

Maren Longbella of The Seattle Times notes that several 1980s horror films such as Pet Sematary utilize the trope of the "Indian burial ground" to generate scares, often without any Indigenous input. The title of Medina's novel "nods to the theme but signals the intent to make it his own".

== See also ==
- Indian burial ground trope
