= Lotz House =

Historic house in Tennessee, United States

- U.S. National Register of Historic Places
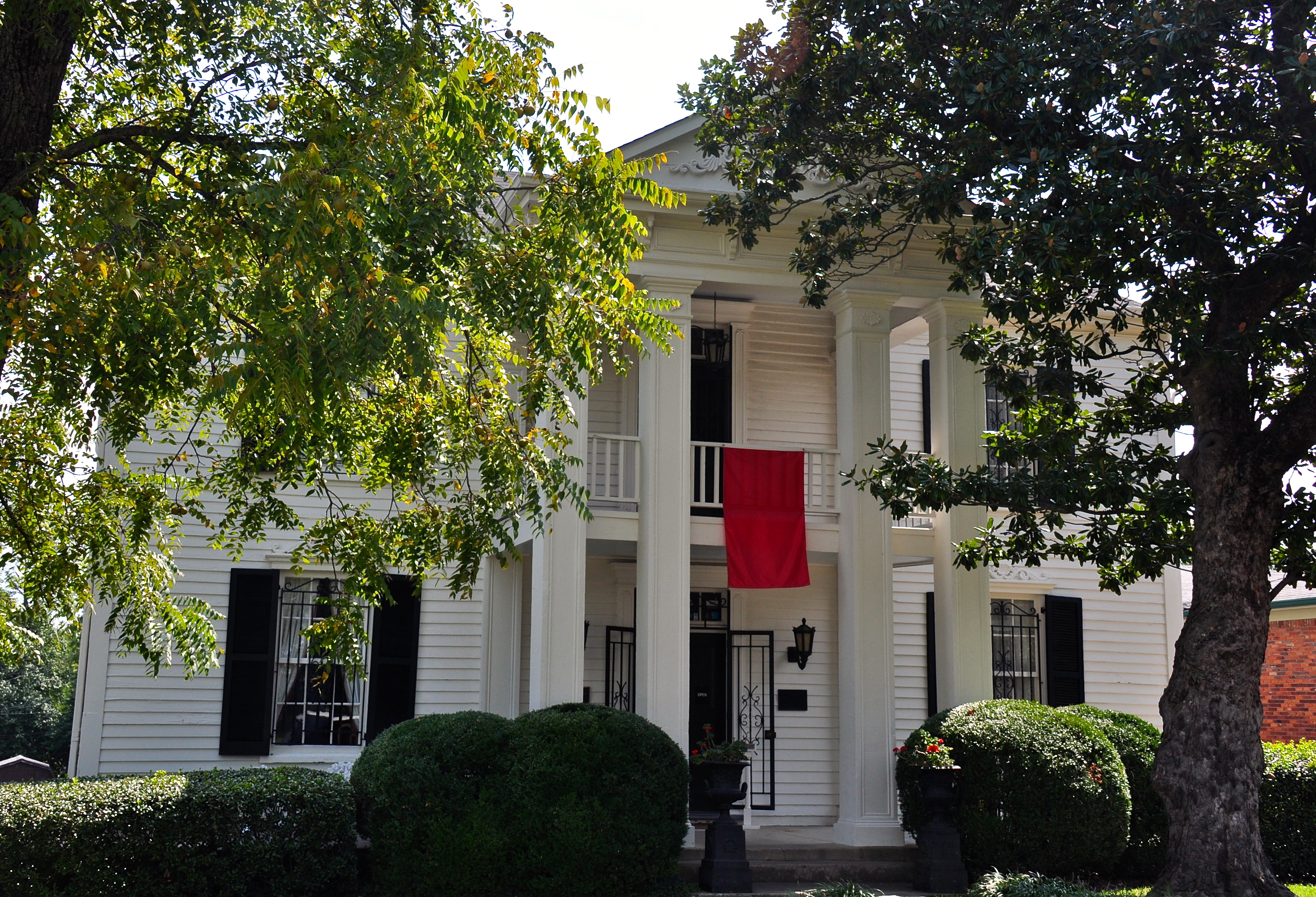
- Lotz House, September 2014.

- Location within Tennessee Location within the United States
- Location: 1111 Columbia Ave., Franklin, Tennessee
- Coordinates: 35°55′4″N 86°52′22″W
- Area: 0.3 acres (0.12 ha)
- Built: 1858
- NRHP reference No.: 76001809
- Added to NRHP: December 12, 1976

The Lotz House (Lotz rhymes with “boats") is a Greek Revival white frame two-story home built in 1858 in the middle Tennessee town of Franklin. The house is significant for being located at the epicenter of the Battle of Franklin in the American Civil War in 1864. The house's occupants, the family of German immigrant Albert Lotz, could see from their front yard a wave thousands of uniformed Confederate soldiers advancing toward them to engage Union soldiers who were in defensive positions in a line adjoining the Lotz' property. During the intense five-hour battle, which resulted in about 10,000 casualties, the Lotz family took shelter in a neighbor's basement.

== History ==
German immigrant Albert Lotz and his family were surprised at their home on Columbia Pike (US 31) on the morning of November 30, 1864, to find thousands of Federal troops marching in front of their house heading north toward Nashville, Tennessee, but unable to proceed across the swollen Harpeth River. Confederate troops attacked with 20,000 men at that point and the Union soldiers manned defensive fortifications on a line across the Lotz and adjacent Carter property.

The Lotz family fled across the street to the Carter House and the two families hid in the Carter's basement witnessing a five-hour battle consisting of intense hand-to hand combat, considered one of the bloodiest battles of the Civil War with 10,000 dead or wounded. The south wall of the Lotz's house was blasted away and cannon fire created holes in the roof and floors, but the structure could still serve as a field hospital later, with Lotz supervising the repairs.

Over the next 100 years, the house had many owners and gradually deteriorated until the Heritage Society of Franklin and Williamson Counties purchased it in 1974 to save it from demolition. It was listed on the National Register of Historic Places in 1976, marking the beginning of its restoration. In 2008, the Lotz House was opened to the public as a historical museum, a privately owned non-profit foundation.

== Johann Albert Lotz ==
Johann Albert Lotz was born in Germany in 1820. He was a skilled woodworker who had worked his way up in the German guild system to the designation of "master craftsman". He came to the United States because other family members had moved there. He arrived in New Orleans in 1848. Lotz met his wife Margaretha there. They eventually moved to Franklin, Tennessee, near Nashville and purchased 5 acres (2.0 ha) of land— a relatively small carve-out from a much larger 300 acres (120 ha) tract owned by Fountain Branch Carter who owned a brick home across the street. Lotz built his two-story frame house himself without the use of slave labor. Historians have wondered why Carter would sell this relatively small plot of land so close to his own home. Historian J.T. Thompson speculated that this narrow area was too rocky for farming saying, "Carter was willing to sell the unproductive real estate to Lotz and pocket the extra cash".

The house is a four-column Greek Revival white frame building at 1111 Columbia Avenue in Franklin. The construction and furnishings show details and woodcarving which attest to Lotz's skill: three fireplaces whose designs range from very simple to intricate; and a solid black walnut handrail that wraps around a staircase from the ground floor to the second floor. Lotz constructed furniture, cabinetry and made pianos.

== The Battle of Franklin ==
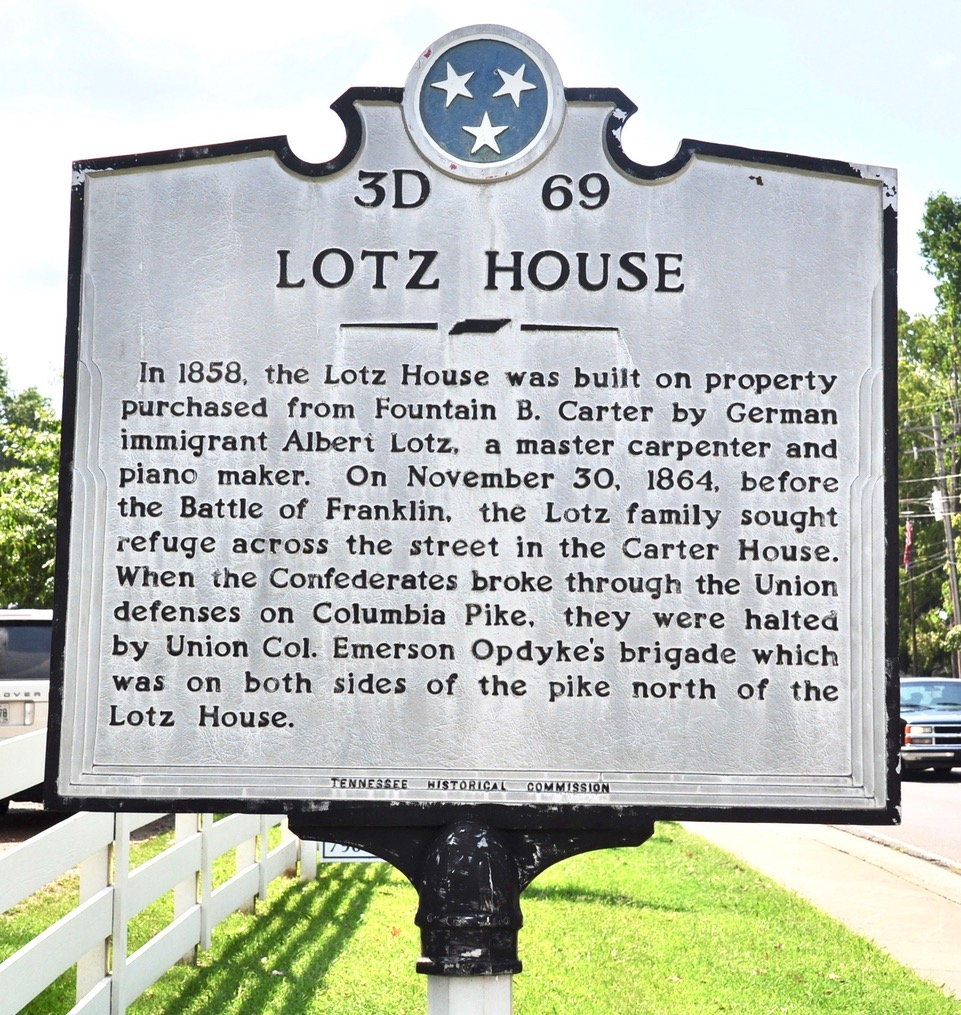

In early 1864, the Union Army, expecting a Confederate attack at some point, began to mobilize large numbers of soldiers in the general area of the Carter and Lotz houses. In their preparations, Union soldiers created defensive fortifications, and cut down every tree they could to prevent Confederate sniping and were said to have poisoned much of the water supply. The Lotz twins, Julius and Julia, went out to play at a nearby stream and were found dead, believed to have been killed by poison in the water according to available letters and diaries. Not all historians agree, saying it is possible that they drowned.

On the day of the battle, the Lotz family was at first surprised to see a seemingly endless line of troops and supply wagons going in front of their house. From their front yard, about 2 p.m., they could see in the distance a tidal wave of thousands of brown and gray uniformed Confederate soldiers covering two miles of open fields and took refuge in the cellar of the Carter house across the street because the Lotz house had insufficient shelter and no hiding place. Lotz salvaged as many of his tools as he could before hiding. The battle raged on for five hours and is considered one of the bloodiest battles of the Civil War. By dark, six Confederate generals were dead or mortally wounded. When the two families emerged from shelter, the area was a wasteland; hundreds of bodies and evidence of brutal hand-to-hand combat. Seventeen dead horses were among the casualties in the Lotz's yard. The Lotz house was still standing, although damaged. The south wall had been blasted away. Cannonball holes and burns can be seen inside the house to this day. Lotz was quick to repair the house, but was saddened that the repairs were done so hurriedly that the craftsmanship was shoddy. The house became a field hospital after the battle.

== After the Civil War ==
Family life went on as usual after the Confederate defeat. McGavock Confederate Cemetery, not far from the house, contains the remains of 1,481 Confederate soldiers. Lotz continued woodworking and his daughter Matilda, an avid artist since young childhood, began to expand her talents and specialized in painting portraits of animals. Her art skills would later be discovered as an adult (see section below). Later in life, Albert Lotz and his family were forced to flee the house after he constructed a piano with an American eagle holding an American flag upward in one claw; and a Confederate flag pointing downward in the other claw carved into it. Outraged Confederate sympathizers spread the word and Lotz became a pariah. After his life was threatened, he abruptly sold the house and contents at a financial loss and the family left the area in a covered wagon to travel west across Indian country to settle in San Jose, California.

Since that time the house has been a private residence, attorney's office, sandwich shop, bakery, flower shop, cooking school, apartment house and gift shop. It was converted into a "haunted house" during Halloween in 1974. In that year, the Heritage Foundation of Franklin and Williamson County bought the house for $25,000 to save it from demolition. They restored the exterior, then sold the house to a private individual who operated a gift shop there. In 2001, the property was bought by J. T. Thompson whose intent was restoring the house as a civil war museum. He contacted David Lotz (the great, great-grandson of the patriarch), who was interested in genealogy had much information about the family, including the proper pronunciation of the name. The museum and grounds of the Lotz House opened in 2008. Its close proximity to the Carter House, the Franklin Battlefield and Carnton Plantation makes it a popular destination for tourists. It was listed on the National Register of Historic Places in 1976. In the mid-2000s, the citizens of Franklin began a reclamation of the battlefield land, raising more than $19 million to buy back properties around the site, called Carter Hill Battlefield Park. In 2008 the Lotz House was opened to the public as a historical museum, a privately owned non-profit foundation.

== Matilda Lotz ==
Lotz's daughter Matilda, born in the house in 1858, was called "Tillie" as a youngster. She was six years old when she huddled with her family during the battle. After the family moved to California, Matilda's talent as an artist was discovered and nurtured by Phoebe Hearst, the mother of newspaper publisher William Randolph Hearst. Matilda completed a six-year study at the San Francisco School of Design graduating summa cum laude and winning several medals for her work. With Hearst's help, Matilda was accepted into the French academy to study in Paris and she received two gold medals by the academy, the first woman to be so rewarded. After returning to California, she painted portraits of Phoebe Hearst and former California Governor Leland Stanford, founder of Stanford University. In 2025, one of Matilda Lotz' paintings was donated to the Lotz House by her great-aunt who lived in New York City. The painting is entitled "Barnyard Christmas" and depicts a sheep and two chickens beside a holly tree. Lotz House Executive Director Thomas Y. Cartwright said the painting would be displayed in the entry way of the museum.

== In popular culture ==
=== Television ===
The Lotz House was one of the haunted locations that was showcased on Most Terrifying Places in America (special episode 6) which premiered in 2010 on the Travel Channel.

Lotz House was also featured as a haunted location on Haunted Live in 2018 on the Travel Channel, where the paranormal team, Tennessee Wraith Chasers, investigated the home and its reports of paranormal activity.
