= Fort Granger =

- U.S. National Register of Historic Places
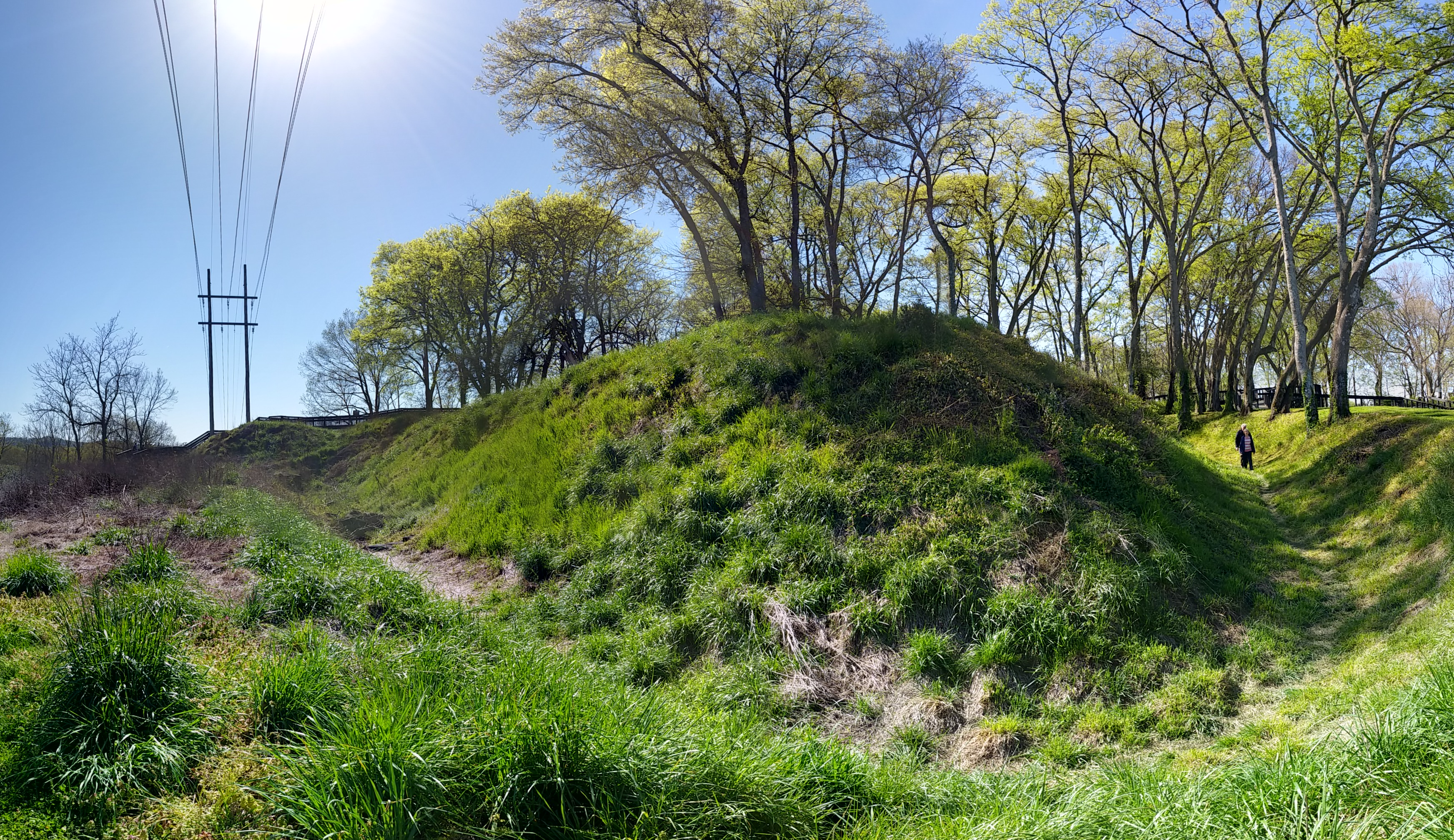
- Fort Granger's earthworks

- Location within Tennessee Location within the United States
- Location: 113 Fort Granger Franklin, TN 37065 Franklin, Tennessee
- Coordinates: 35°55′33″N 86°51′38″W
- Area: 20 acres (8.1 ha)
- Built: 1862
- NRHP reference No.: 73001858
- Added to NRHP: January 8, 1973

Fort Granger was a Union fort built in 1862 in Franklin, Tennessee, south of Nashville, after their forces occupied the state during the American Civil War. One of several fortifications constructed in the Franklin Battlefield, the fort was used by Union troops to defend their positions in Middle Tennessee against Confederate attackers. The Second Battle of Franklin in 1864, part of the Franklin-Nashville Campaign in the Western Theater, was the most notable engagement of this area during the Civil War.

Today, Fort Granger's remaining earthworks are preserved within a city park that is located near the center of Franklin. Fort Granger is listed on the National Register of Historic Places. The site is accessible to the public via a trail from Pinkerton Park. Its grounds include a boardwalk offering a view of the Harpeth River and extending through part of the fort's site.

== History ==
=== As a fort ===
==== Construction, early use ====
After the Union Army captured Nashville early in 1862, Union troops under the command of Major General Gordon Granger occupied Franklin within a few weeks The Union Army, fearful of local unrest and Confederate guerrillas, began planning and construction of an artillery position to protect the Nashville railroad line nearby. Construction of Fort Granger, named for Major General Gordon Granger, began in 1863, and was overseen by Captain W. E. Morrill.

Fort Granger was built on Figuer's Bluff, north of the Harpeth River and parallel to the railroad to Nashville. Siting it on the bluff enabled strategic military control over the Harpeth River bridge of the Tennessee and Alabama Railroad. The fort also had control over the southern and northern approaches to Franklin.

The completed fort comprised nearly 275,000 square feet. It is approximately 781 feet long and 346 wide. Its entrance was called the "sally port." The strongest part of the fortification, called "The Cavalier," was the location where the ground was the highest. This "fort within a fort" was meant for use during overpowering attacks where defenders could make a final stand against invaders. The Cavalier was ideal for artillery because it provided the best view of the surrounding landscape.

Union troops and some refugee contraband slaves built Fort Granger. James L. Rogers, 98th Ohio Infantry, wrote a letter dated June 4, 1863 that lists some of the Federal units who constructed Fort Granger. Rogers said,

"For the last 2 months and over we have been camped in, near Franklin, Tenn.. While our stay there, our time was principally occupied in working on the fortifications and scouting occasionally. And on the 2nd day of June General Grainger’s commenced including the 125th.O., 124th., O, 113th., O., 121st.O., 98th.O., 40th.O., 115th.ILL., 96th., ILL., 12ILL., & 84th Ind., and 2 or 3 regts of cavalry & 3 battries left Franklin at 6 a.m."

The Samuel Boyd Map shows the positions of the Federal unit's camp sites at Franklin in 1863.

The Union position in Franklin was initially secure, and Fort Granger had only a small garrison. Union troops hanged two Confederate spies on June 9, 1863. The fort's artillery was used twice in 1863 against Confederate cavalry forces.

==== During the Second Battle of Franklin ====
Fort Granger's most important time came during the Second Battle of Franklin. Confederate John Bell Hood led efforts in September 1864 with the Army of Tennessee to attack Union General William T. Sherman's supply lines, after Sherman had defeated Hood at Atlanta. Hood directed the army north into Tennessee.

Fort Granger served the Union cause. In the late afternoon of November 30, 1864, Confederate General John Bell Hood's army attacked Union General John M. Schofield's troops in a fierce battle. The fighting lasted for five hours, including widespread hand-to-hand combat and artillery fire, causing 10,000 casualties on both sides. Union General Schofield commanded Union forces from inside the fort, where he had an excellent view of the battlefield. At the same time, he ordered his men to build pontoon bridges across the Harpeth River, permitting the movement of supply wagons and troops to Nashville once the battle had ended.

Fort Granger's artillery delivered enfilading fire upon Confederate attackers on November 30, 1864. Four 3-inch rifled cannons in Fort Granger were fired by Capt. Giles J. Cockerill, Battery D, 1st Ohio Light Artillery. The Confederates suffered serious casualties under the 163 rounds fired by Cockerill's guns. The right wing of the Confederate line, commanded by Gen. A. P. Stewart's corps, suffered the most from these rounds. Confederate attackers were subject to massed fire from the Union artillery from the fort. Local topography made Fort Granger's fire all the more lethal. When Confederate General Stewart's men advanced under fire, their right flank was blocked by the Harpeth River. Confederate infantry regiments such as the 35th Alabama and the 12th Louisiana, General Thomas Scott's brigade, and the 43rd Mississippi, Gen. John Adams' brigade, were in particular had numerous casualties. Stewart's Corps suffered almost 3,000 casualties during the battle.

German immigrant and Union Lieutenant Frederick W. Fout described the scene: "From our post at Fort Granger, we could see every troop and every gun in our line, as long as it was day and the cloud of gun smoke allowed it. After sundown, the sparks of rifle fire and the lightning, thunder and groaning of the heavy cannons was splendid and awe-inspiring for the eye and ear."

==== Condition in 1864-5 ====
In 1864, James Willett found the fort to be in a "dilapidated condition" and noted that "no efforts had been made to keep it in proper order or repair." He noted further that the "magazines [were] very damp and entirely unfit to store ammunition." He further "noticed green mold on the ceiling." "The heavy guns," he noted, "were being remounted"; Willett believed that "the intention was to keep two field pieces in the fort." The site is accessible to the public via a trail from Pinkerton Park. Its grounds include a boardwalk offering a view of the Harpeth River and extending through part of the fort's site.

By June 1865, the fort's was inspected under the authority of Maj Gen George H. Thomas. It was then "in reality dismantled, both guns and gun platforms having been removed; yet there [was] a small detachment living in tents within the fort", of insufficient number to keep it "in order" Batteries constructed to the north had long been abandoned.

=== As a historical site ===
In 1973, a 20-acre (8.1 ha) area designated as the Fort Granger site, which included one contributing structure and one contributing site, was listed on the National Register of Historic Places. The site now contains several historical panels about the fort's history and the events surrounding its construction and use.

== Gallery ==
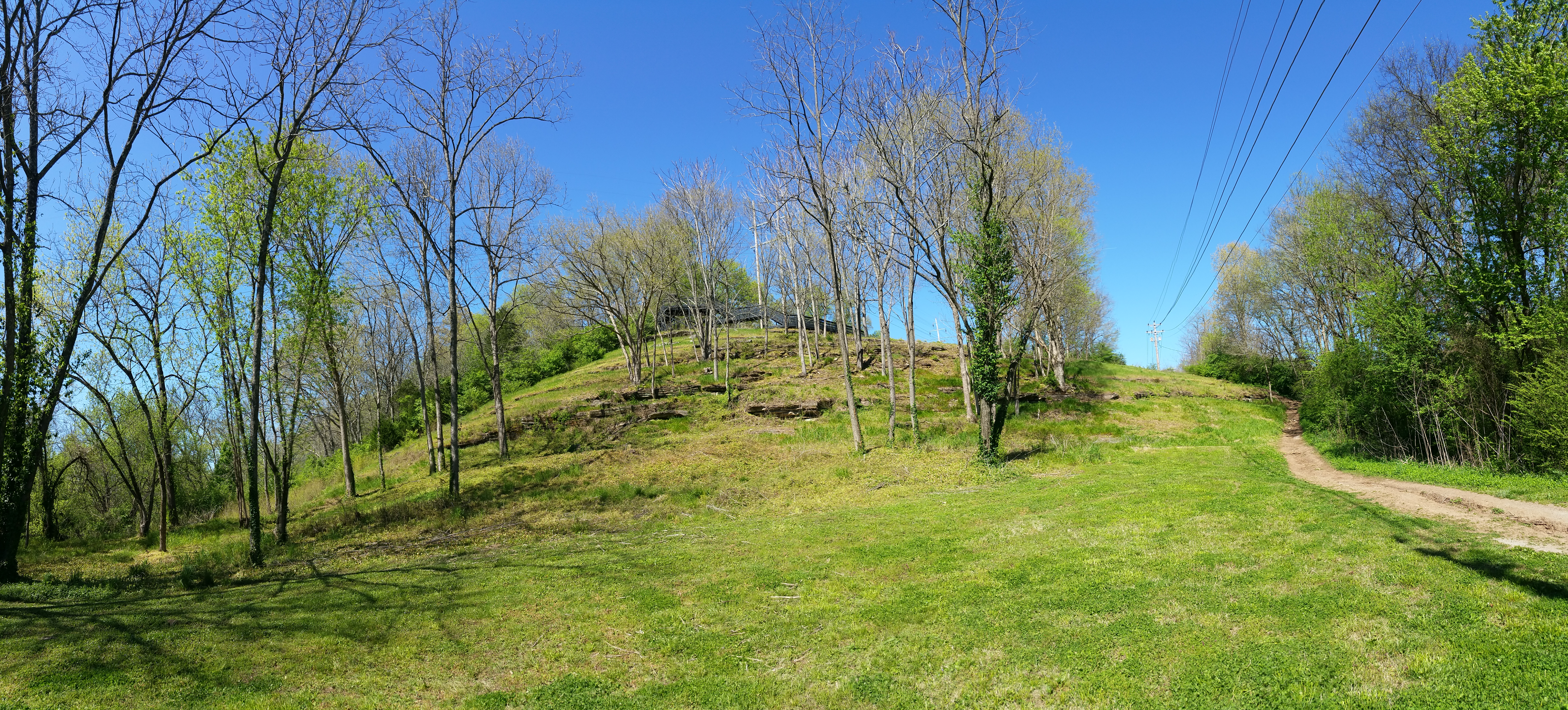
View of fort site from the bottom of the trail

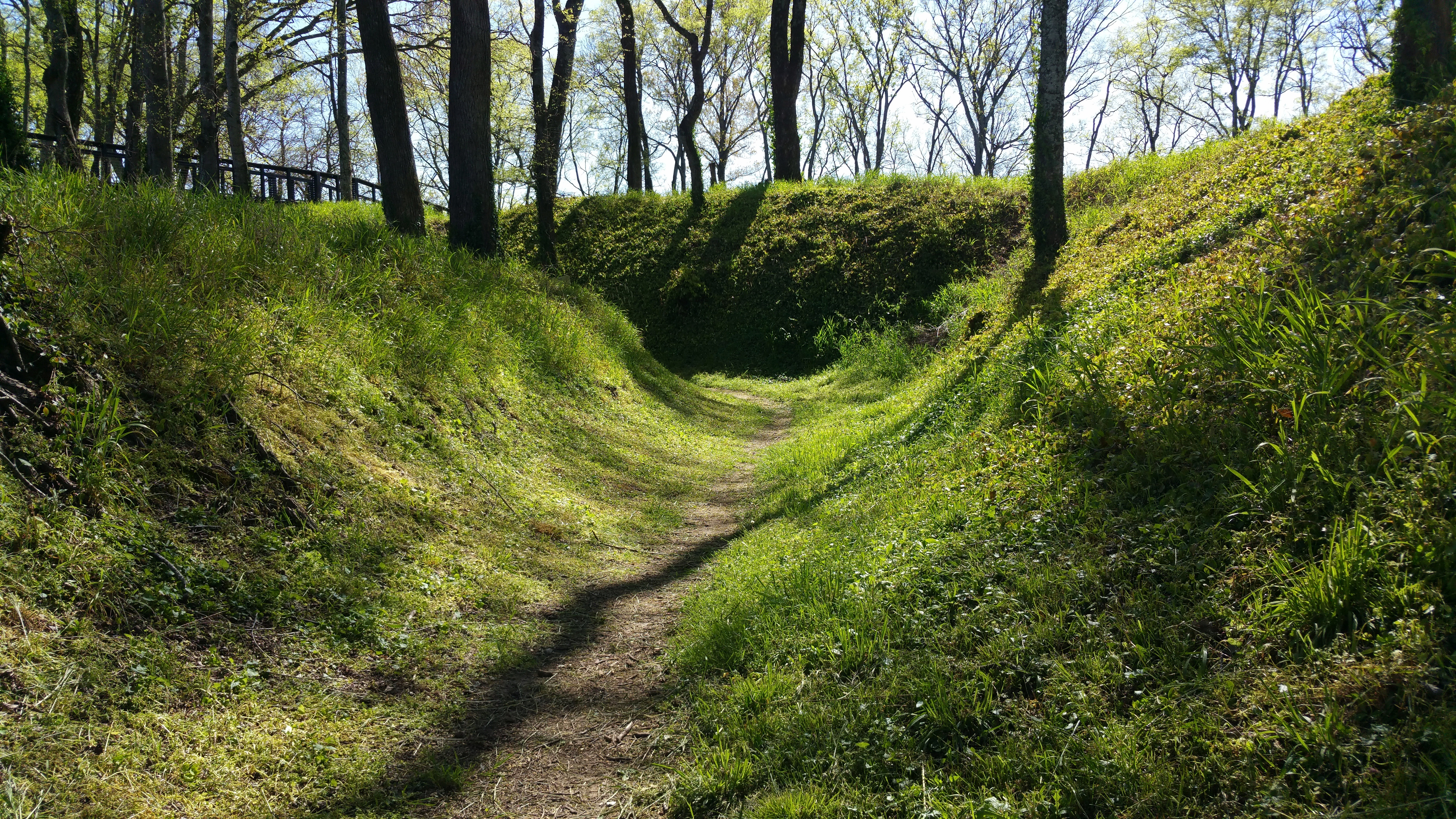
Fort Granger earthworks

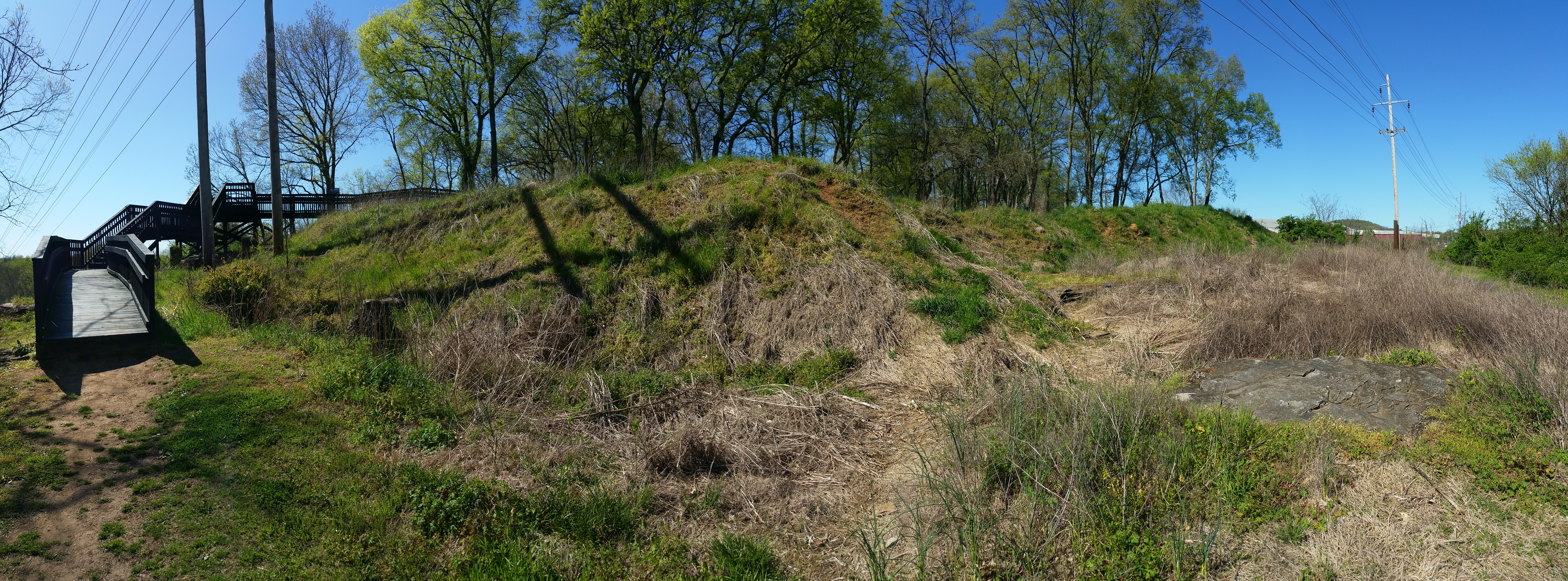
View of earthworks and observation deck

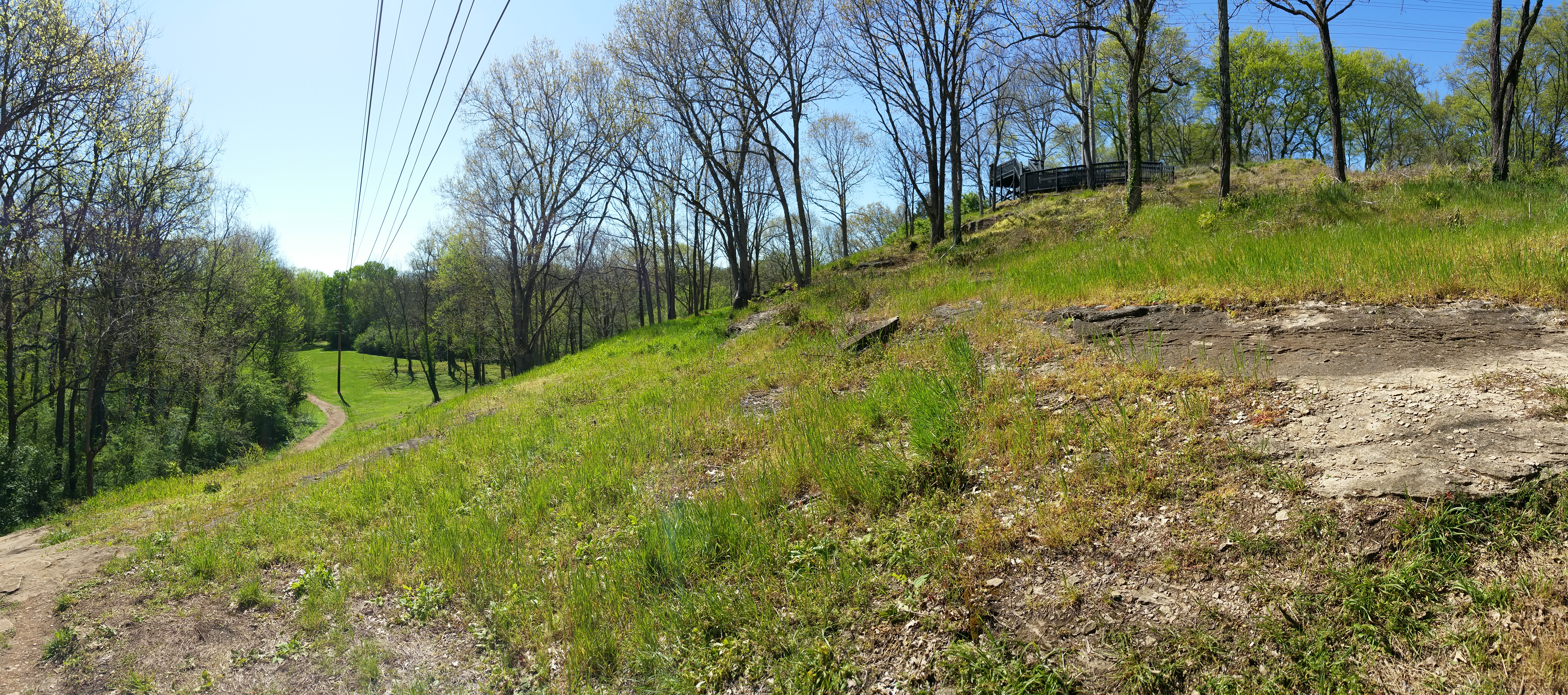
View of trail leading up to fort

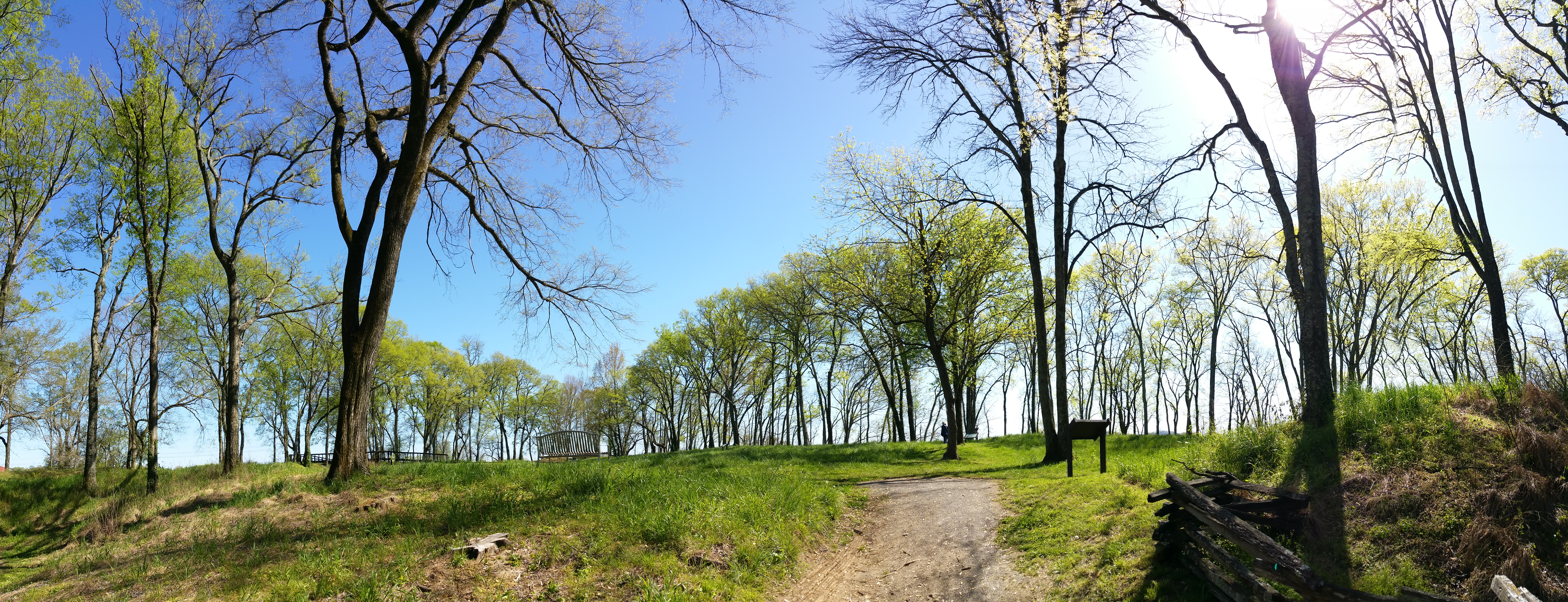
Center of the Fort Granger site

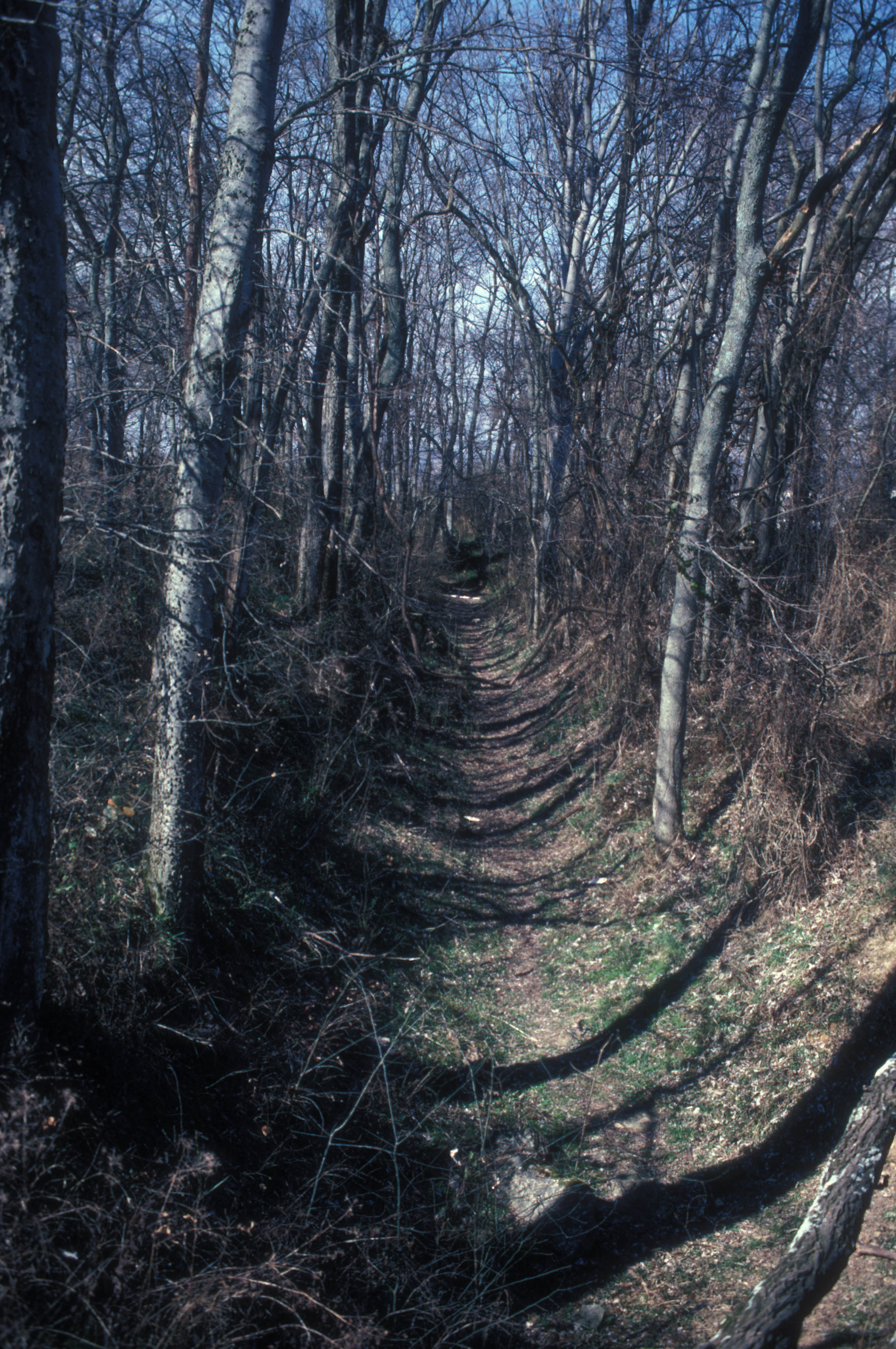

== See also ==
- Franklin Battlefield
- Winstead Hill, also NRHP-listed within the Franklin Battlefield area
- Carnton, also NRHP-listed in the battlefield
- Fountain Carter House, also NRHP-listed in the battlefield
- Roper's Knob Fortifications, another NRHP-listed fortification on the Franklin battlefield area
