= Marjim Manor =

Marjim Manor is a house in Appleton, New York in the United States.

== History ==
In 1834, Shubal Scudder Merrit bought 205 acres of land from the Holland Land Company. He built a log cabin and moved his family onto the property. Sophia Spencer Willson and he had been married in 1830 and their son Lewis Willson was born in 1832. Eventually, he built a frame house and two more children were born, Phebe Sophia and Cordelia Marie.

As he became more profitable, his wife wanted a house to reflect this. In 1854 he built a brick home. Lewis enrolled in the University of Rochester, but the two girls moved into the family home. Sophia died in the home in 1864. The following year, Lewis also died in the home. Shubal lived there until 1881, when he died on March 2.

The daughters inherited the house. Phebe Sophia and her husband, Lucius Adams, bought Cordelia's portion and ran the farm with a series of caretakers. They lived there for several years with their daughter, Elizabeth.

In 1895, Dr Charles A. Ring purchased the home. His wife, Hannah Denelia Ripley Farwell, wanted to move out of Buffalo and the two had the dream of farming. In Buffalo, they lived on Fargo Avenue, a few doors up from Hannah's father, Reverend Allen Plumb Ripley and his second wife, Florella Celesta Morse. They became very successful peach farmers, participating in many research projects through Cornell University. In June, 1907, Hannah died in the home. Charles remained in home he named Appleton Hall. In January 1908, he filed a new will naming Elia Estelle Morse (Florella's younger half sister) as the recipient of the home. On February 28, 1908, he died, supposedly of heart disease. Estelle, as she was called, promptly moved into the house with her widowed sister, Florella. Florella died in the home in September, 1908.

In 1909, Estelle married John Farmer Whitwill, a widower who had helped farm the property. They lived in the house until 1922, when they moved to West Somerset, NY. Various sales of the home fell through and it went into foreclosure.

On July 19, 1933, Mr Calahan from M & T Bank, visited Mother Constantia Driscoll of the Sisters of St. Joseph. The Sisters were at their summer home, St. Mary's, in Olcott. As teachers of the deaf, the Sisters were considering a vocational farm school for the boys in their school in Buffalo. Mother Constantia and a group of sisters looked at the property, just a few miles up the road. On the lake was a cabin that resembled the order's first home in Carondelet, Missouri. They promptly purchased the property to use as a camp for girls, farm school for deaf boys and summer retreat for themselves. They owned it until 1993.

== Present day ==
David P. Gardner of Gardner Graphics purchased the property for his business and later his residence. Ten years later, in 2003, Margo Sue Bittner bought it to use as a winery. On August 6, 2004, the winery opened with 10 different wines available. The winery produces fruit wines, and also rents out rooms for parties and receptions. It has a local reputation as a haunted house, and was featured on the television series Ghost Hunters and Most Terrifying Places in America.

== Bibliography ==
- Autobiography of Delilah Wisner Merritt, published 1930
- Union Journal obituary: Shubal Scudder Merritt, March 5, 1881
- New York World newspaper, June, 1908
- New York Tribune Farmer, June 1908
- Buffalo Advertiser Newspaper, December 1880
- Genesee Conference of the Methodist Church Annual, 1908
- Like a Swarm of Bees, the story of the Sisters of St. Joseph
