= Pinkerton Park =

Park in Tennessee, United States

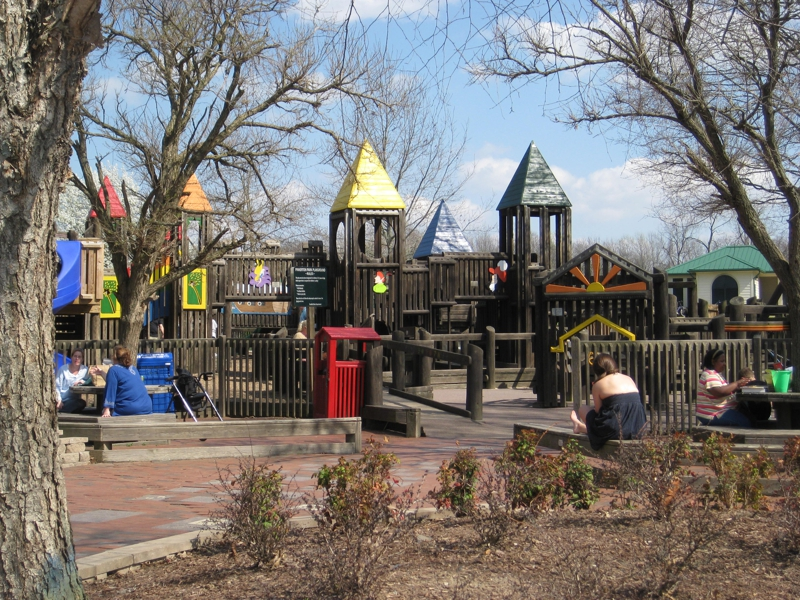
- Pinkerton Park in 2011
- Interactive map of Pinkerton Park
- Type: Public park
- Location: Franklin, Tennessee
- Coordinates: 35.921°N 86.861°W
- Area: 34-acre (0.14 km^{2})
- Operator: Department of Parks and Facilities, Franklin, Tennessee

Pinkerton Park is a 34-acre municipal park located in Franklin, Tennessee, United States at 405 Murfreesboro Road, east of the Harpeth River, near downtown Franklin.

The park includes a mile-long paved pedestrian track, with exercise equipment located at various points on the trail. A total of fourteen picnic tables are available, as well as grills, located in various parts of the park. Pinkerton Park has restrooms, as well as a pedestrian bridge across the Harpeth River. Two playgrounds are available for children; one of them, Tinkerbell playground, is self-contained.

Pinkerton Park is the most used park in the Franklin Park system.

Fort Granger is located to the north of the park, and may be reached by a trail.

In 2018, the Park debuted "Storybook Trail," a series of 20 panels along the park's walking trail, an open-air book about forest animals for parents to read aloud to children. The story will be changed annually.

== Redesign ==
In 2010, the park was redesigned and repaired by members of the City’s Parks Department. The playground area was renamed "Tinkerbell Playground" after the character from the Disney film. Wooden portraits of the characters can be seen inside of the playground.
