= Robert Hicks (American author) =

American novelist and battlefield preservationist (1951–2022)

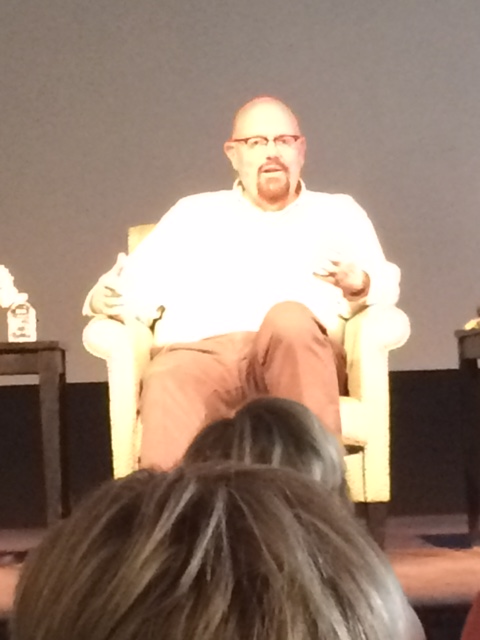
- Hicks at the 2016 Rancho Mirage Writers Festival
- Born: Robert Benjamin Hicks III; January 30, 1951; West Palm Beach, Florida, U.S.
- Died: February 25, 2022 (aged 71) near Franklin, Tennessee, U.S.
- Occupation: Novelist

Robert Benjamin Hicks III (January 30, 1951 – February 25, 2022) was an American author. He wrote the New York Times bestseller The Widow of the South and has played a major role in preserving the historic Carnton mansion, a focal point in the Battle of Franklin which occurred on November 30, 1864. The American Battlefield Trust named Hicks a Preservation Champion for his work on battlefield preservation. Nashville Lifestyles Magazine named Hicks among the top 100 Reasons to Love Nashville, describing him as Nashville's "Master of Ceremonies" and citing his passion for preservation of historic places.

== Life and career ==
Robert Hicks was born in West Palm Beach, Florida, on January 30, 1951. He moved to Williamson County, Tennessee, in 1974 and lived near the Bingham Community at "Labor in Vain," his late-eighteenth-century log cabin.

Hicks worked in the music publishing industry in Nashville, Tennessee.

Hicks was active in art and the field of historic preservation, serving on the boards of several organizations including the Tennessee State Museum, Carnton Plantation, the Williamson County Historical Society, the Museum of Early Southern Decorative Arts in Winston-Salem, North Carolina, and the Ogden Museum of Southern Art in New Orleans. He was an internationally recognized collector of Southern antiques and folk art. He curated the landmark exhibition “Art of Tennessee” at the Frist Center for Visual Arts in Nashville in 2003.

Hicks died from cancer near Franklin, Tennessee, on February 25, 2022, at the age of 71.

== Historic preservation ==
The American Battlefield Protection Program has called his work to preserve the site of the Battle of Franklin "the largest battlefield reclamation in North American history." By the end of 2005, Franklin's Charge had already raised over 5 million dollars toward this goal. As Jim Lighthizer, President of the Civil War Preservation Trust has said, "There is no 'close second' in any community in America, to what Robert Hicks and Franklin's Charge has done in Franklin." The Governor named Hicks as a commissioner to plan out the 150th Anniversary of the Civil War in Tennessee.

For his work in battlefield preservation in 2018 Hicks was awarded the Edwin C. Bearss Lifetime Achievement Award by the American Battlefield Trust.

== Novels ==
=== The Widow of the South ===
Hicks became fascinated by the Battle of Franklin, Tennessee, a major battle which occurred in the final months of the Civil War. During his many years working at Carnton, he began to develop a book idea, and during an accidental meeting with civil war historian and author Shelby Foote, he received further encouragement to complete a historic novel about the battle.

The result was Hicks' first novel, The Widow of the South (Grand Central Publishing, 2005; ISBN 9780759514430 The Widow of the South was launched September 1, 2005, entering the New York Times Bestseller List after only one week out.

The novel is centered around the Carnton Plantation and mansion which was commandeered by officers of the Confederate States Army as a hospital during the Battle of Franklin II. Hicks creates a cast of characters including the madame of the mansion, Carrie Winder McGavock, and soldiers wounded during this monumental battle. The novel has been critically acclaimed as comparable to other literary works on the Civil War including The Killer Angels, Rifles for Watie and Shiloh.

In December 2005, Nashville's The Tennessean named him "Tennessean of the Year" for the impact The Widow of the South had on Tennessee, heritage tourism and preservation.

=== A Separate Country ===
Hicks' second novel, A Separate Country (Grand Central Publishing, 2009; ISBN 9780446558365), was released on September 23, 2009.

=== The Orphan Mother ===
Hicks' third novel, The Orphan Mother (Grand Central Publishing, 2016, ISBN 139781455541737) was published on September 13, 2016.

== Other writings and presentations ==
Several of Hicks's essays on have been published. Hicks wrote op-eds for The New York Times on contemporary politics in the South. He was also a regular contributor to Garden & Gun.

He traveled, throughout the nation, speaking on a variety of topics ranging from "Why The South Matters to The Importance of Fiction in Preserving History to Southern Material Culture" to "A Model for the Preservation of Historic Open Space for Every Community".

Hicks's first book, a collaboration with French-American photographer Michel Arnaud, came out in 2000: Nashville: the Pilgrims of Guitar Town (New Line Books, 2005; ISBN 9781597640596).

He was co-editor (with Justin Stelter and John Bohlinger) of a collection of short stories, A Guitar and A Pen: Stories by Country Music's Greatest Songwriters (Center Street, 2008; ISBN 9781599951386).

He has also written the introduction to two books on historic preservation authored by photographer, Nell Dickerson: GONE: A Photographic Plea for Preservation (BelleBooks, 2011; ISBN 9781611940039) and Porch Dogs (John F. Blair, 2013; ISBN 9780895875976)

In January 2016 Hicks was a panelist and featured speaker at the third annual Rancho Mirage Writers Festival in Rancho Mirage, CA. Along with American historian H.W. Brands, Hicks took part in the panel discussion "The War that Forged a Nation: Why the Civil War Matters."

== Battlefield Bourbon ==
To commemorate the 150th anniversary of the Battle of Franklin, in 2014 Hicks released the first small batch of his bourbon whiskey Battlefield Bourbon. Each of the 1,864 bottles is numbered and signed by Hicks. About his decision to release Battlefield Bourbon he said, "My decision to only produce 1,864 bottles of Battlefield Bourbon this year makes it pretty much the smallest batch of small batch bourbon anywhere. Yet, it only seemed right as I promised myself that whatever I produced would be really good and really rare. Besides, as I am signing and numbering every bottle, I figured that I needed to protect the old signing hand and 1,864 bottles seemed like enough. Of course, 1864 is the year of the Battle of Franklin, which this sesquicentennial commemoration is all about."
