= Winstead Hill =

- U.S. National Register of Historic Places
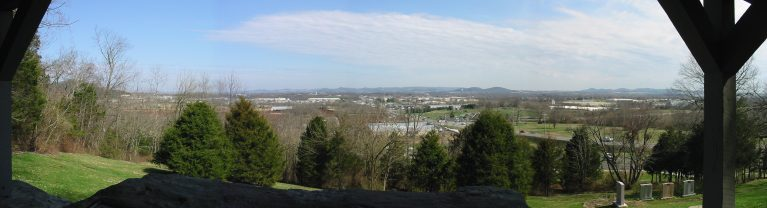

- Location within Tennessee Location within the United States
- Location: 2 mi. S of Franklin on U.S. 31, Franklin, Tennessee
- Coordinates: 35°53′17″N 86°52′45″W
- Area: 9.8 acres (4.0 ha)
- Built: 1864
- NRHP reference No.: 74001930
- Added to NRHP: November 29, 1974

Winstead Hill is a property in Franklin, Tennessee that has significance in 1864 for being in the Second Battle of Franklin battlefield. It is located within the Franklin Battlefield, a U.S. National Historic Landmark area.

In the battle, Confederate troops under General Hood attacked from Winstead Hill.

It was listed on the National Register of Historic Places in 1974.

== See also ==
- Carnton, also NRHP-listed in the battlefield
- Fountain Carter House, also NRHP-listed in the battlefield
- Fort Granger, also NRHP-listed in the battlefield
