= Lake Shawnee Amusement Park =

Defunct amusement park in West Virginia

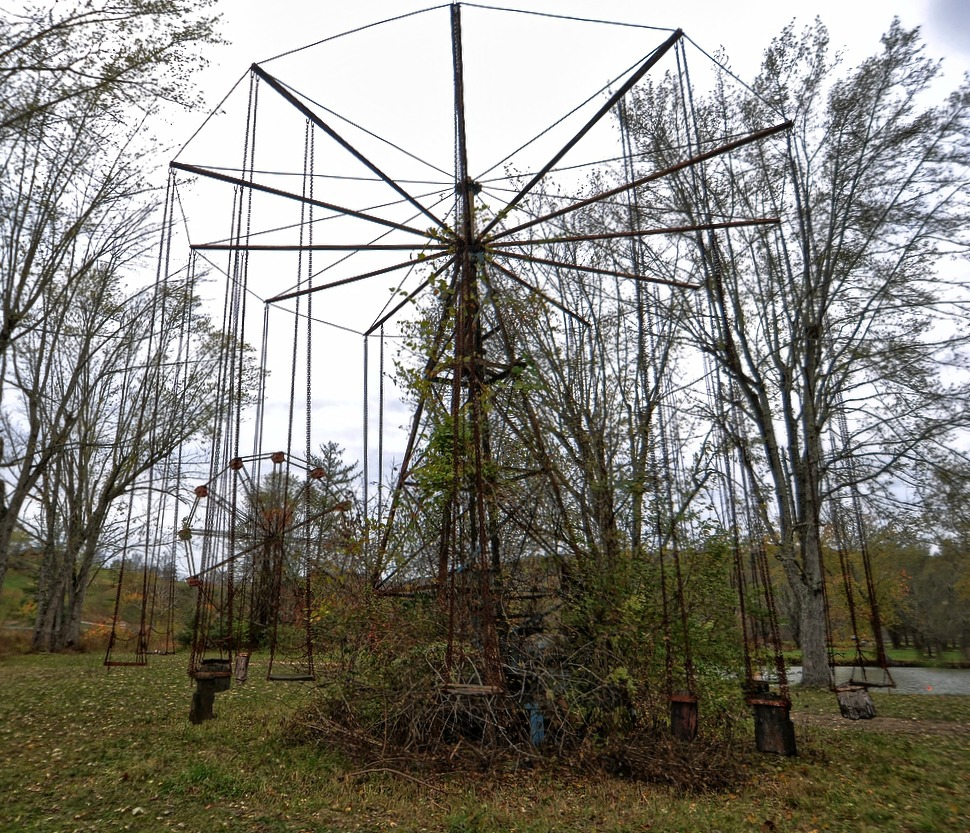
- Amusement park in 2013
- Interactive map of Lake Shawnee Amusement Park
- Location: Princeton, West Virginia, U.S.
- Coordinates: 37.406050°N 81.142372°W
- Status: Defunct
- Opened: 1926
- Closed: 1988

The Lake Shawnee Amusement Park is a defunct amusement park in Princeton, West Virginia, United States, located along Lake Shawnee. Opened in 1926, the park operated for 62 years before closing in 1988. It received public attention for urban legends regarding the park being haunted due to accidental deaths supposedly caused by "cursed land".

== History ==
The land on which the amusement park was built was the site of a massacre in which three members of landowner Mitchell Clay's family were murdered by Native Americans in 1783. A daughter and son (aged 16 and 18) had been killed and scalped while another son (aged 16) was captured and taken to Chillicothe and burned at the stake. Clay sought revenge, and with the help of other landowners, he killed several of the Native American raiding party. Some accounts state that Clay did not seek revenge against the Shawnee and instead desired to give his children a proper burial, making a deal with the Shawnee Chief and ending the dispute.

In 1926, an entrepreneur named Conley Trigg Snidow, Sr. purchased the land and began developing an amusement park for the people of Mercer County, West Virginia. The park, which featured a ferris wheel and a swing ride, was popular among locals in the county, particularly families of coal miners who resided in the area. It also featured a swimming pool, race track, concession stands, dance hall, and cabins for overnight stays. Two drowning deaths were reported during Snidow's ownership, as well as the death of a young girl on the swing ride in 1966. The park was closed in 1967 because of a failed health inspection.

In 1985, former employee Gaylord White purchased the land and reopened the park in the summer of 1987. After increasing insurance rates forced the park to close in 1988, White sought other uses for the location, such as fishing tournaments and off-road motorsports. In the early 1990s, White's work crews uncovered numerous Native American artifacts on the property dating to before the arrival of Anglo-European settlers. Archeologists from Marshall University spent several years uncovering artifacts and graves, and a total of thirteen Native American skeletons were uncovered, mostly of elderly people and young children. Shortly after, White began hosting Halloween week guided paranormal tours of the property.

== In the media ==
=== Television ===
The park was featured on the television series Scariest Places on Earth in 2002 which aired on ABC Family.

The abandoned Lake Shawnee Amusement Park was also showcased on the part 5 episode of Most Terrifying Places in America which aired on the Travel Channel in 2010.

In 2010, Everyday Paranormal featured Lake Shawnee Amusement Park in Season 2 of Discovery Channel's Ghost Lab.

In 2018 lake Shawnee was featured on The Dead Files: Season 9, Episode 12 - Rotten Tomatoes episode titled "Terrorland"

In 2019, Lake Shawnee Amusement Park was also featured in a haunted locations on the paranormal TV series, Most Terrifying Places which aired on Travel Channel.

The park was also featured on the paranormal TV series, The UnXplained which aired on History Channel in 2019.

The park was featured in a 2021 episode of Portals to Hell with Jack Osbourne.
