= Frederick William Fout =

German soldier who fought in the American Civil War

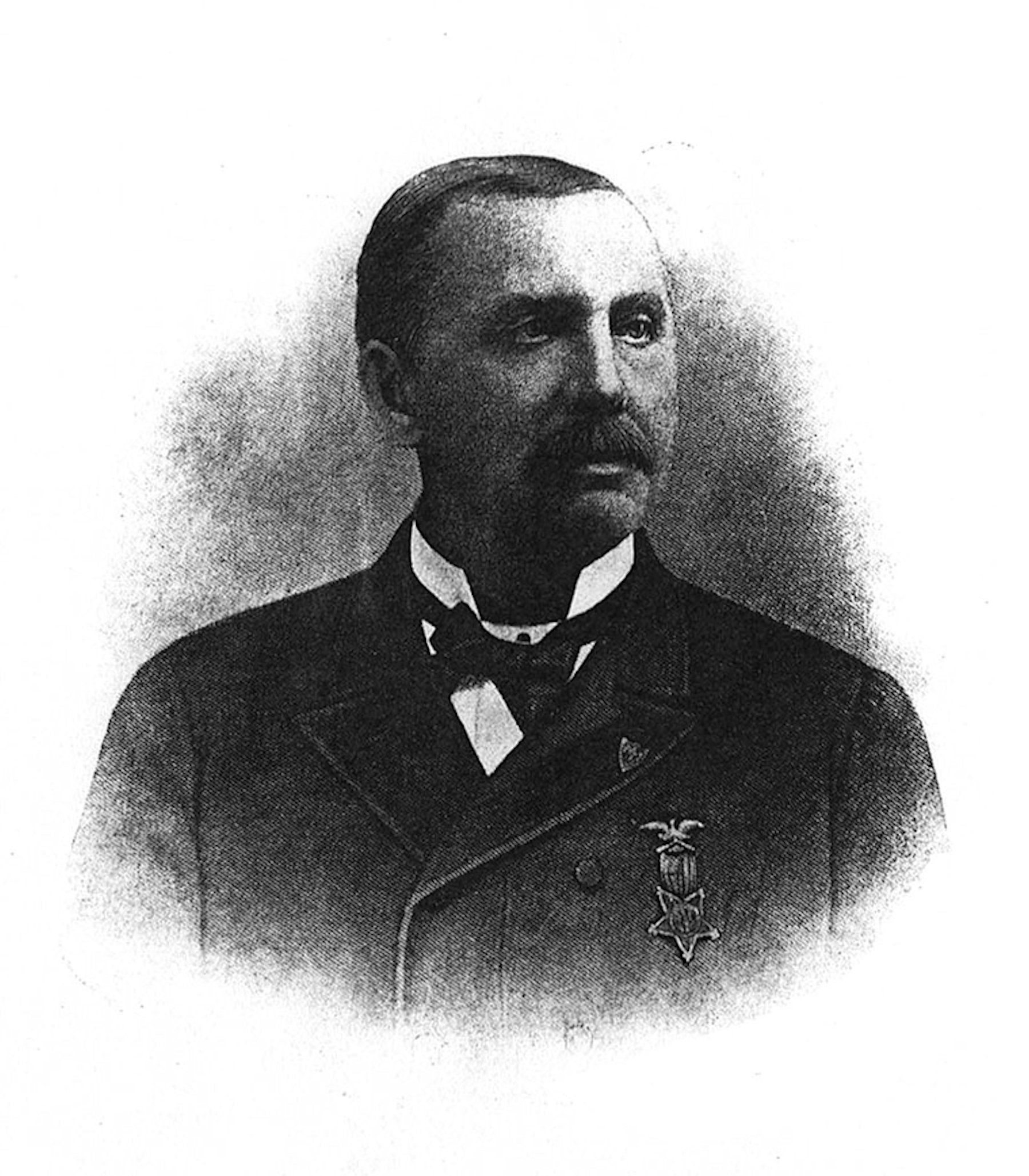
- Medal of Honor recipient Frederick W Fout, c. 1896
- Born: October 30, 1839 or sometime in 1840; Meissen, Germany
- Died: June 6, 1905; St. Louis, Missouri, US
- Burial place: Bellefontaine Cemetery
- Military career
- Allegiance: United States of America
- Branch: United States Army
- Service years: 1861–1865
- Rank: Second Lieutenant
- Unit: 15th Independent Battery, Indiana Light Artillery
- Awards: Medal of Honor

Second Lieutenant Frederick William Fout (October 30, 1839 or 1840 – June 6, 1905) was a German soldier who fought in the American Civil War. Fout received the United States' highest award for bravery during combat, the Medal of Honor, for his action near Harpers Ferry in West Virginia on September 15, 1862. He was honored with the award on November 2, 1896.

== Biography ==
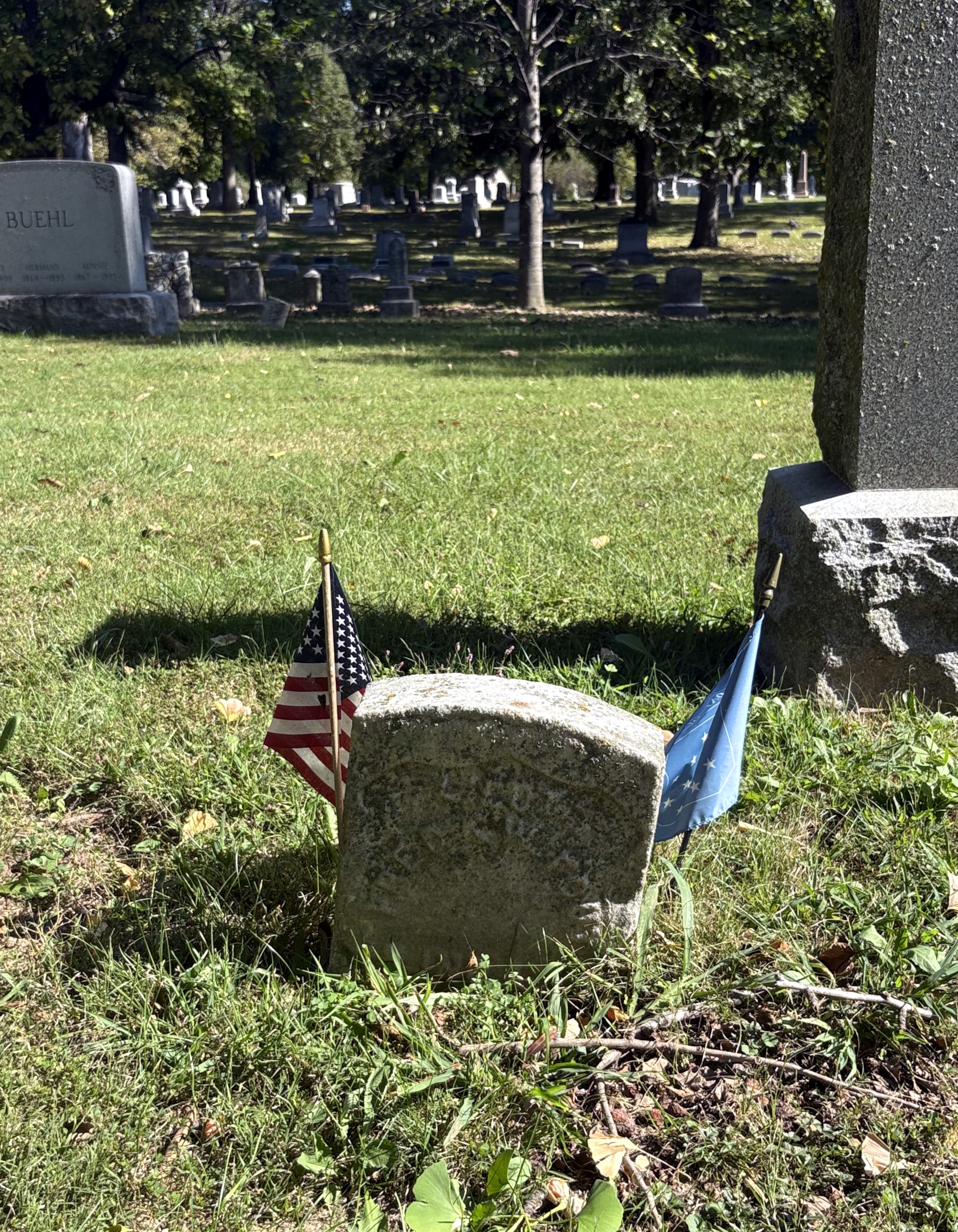
Fout's grave at Bellefontaine Cemetery

Fout was born in Meissen, Germany, on October 30, 1839 (according to some accounts), as Friedrich Wilhelm Fout. Other sources state he was born in 1840. At about age 15, Fout left Germany for the United States, where he stayed with an uncle in New Palestine, Indiana, anglicizing his name to Frederick William upon entry.

A carpenter at the outbreak of the war, Fout first enlisted for a three-month service with the 7th Indiana Infantry Regiment in April 1861. After involvement in the Battle of Philippi (West Virginia), and the Battle of Laurel Hill his company was mustered out in August of that year. Fout re-enlisted into the Indiana Light Artillery. It was during his service in this regiment that he performed the act of gallantry that earned him the Medal of Honor. He was promoted to first lieutenant in January 1864 and put in command of his battery. In his personal papers, William Tecumseh Sherman mentioned that Fout's battery fired the first shell into Atlanta.

Fout officially became an American citizen in 1865. Following the war, Fout moved to New York, where he married his former schoolteacher's daughter. After moving to Indianapolis, he started a glass manufacturing business. Several years later, he moved to St. Louis, Missouri, continuing his trade there. In his later life he moved into pensions and claims and also constructing houses.

He died on June 6, 1905, and his remains are interred at the Bellefontaine Cemetery in St. Louis, Missouri.

== Medal of Honor citation ==
The President of the United States of America, in the name of Congress, takes pleasure in presenting the Medal of Honor to Second Lieutenant Frederick W. Fout, United States Army, for extraordinary heroism on 15 September 1862, while serving with Battery 15, Indiana Light Artillery, in action at Harpers Ferry, West Virginia. Second Lieutenant Fout voluntarily gathered the men of the battery together, re-manned the guns, which had been ordered abandoned by an officer, opened fire, and kept up the same on the enemy until after the surrender.

== See also ==
- List of American Civil War Medal of Honor recipients: A–F
