= Carter House (Franklin, Tennessee) =

Historic house in Tennessee, United States

- U.S. Historic district – Contributing property
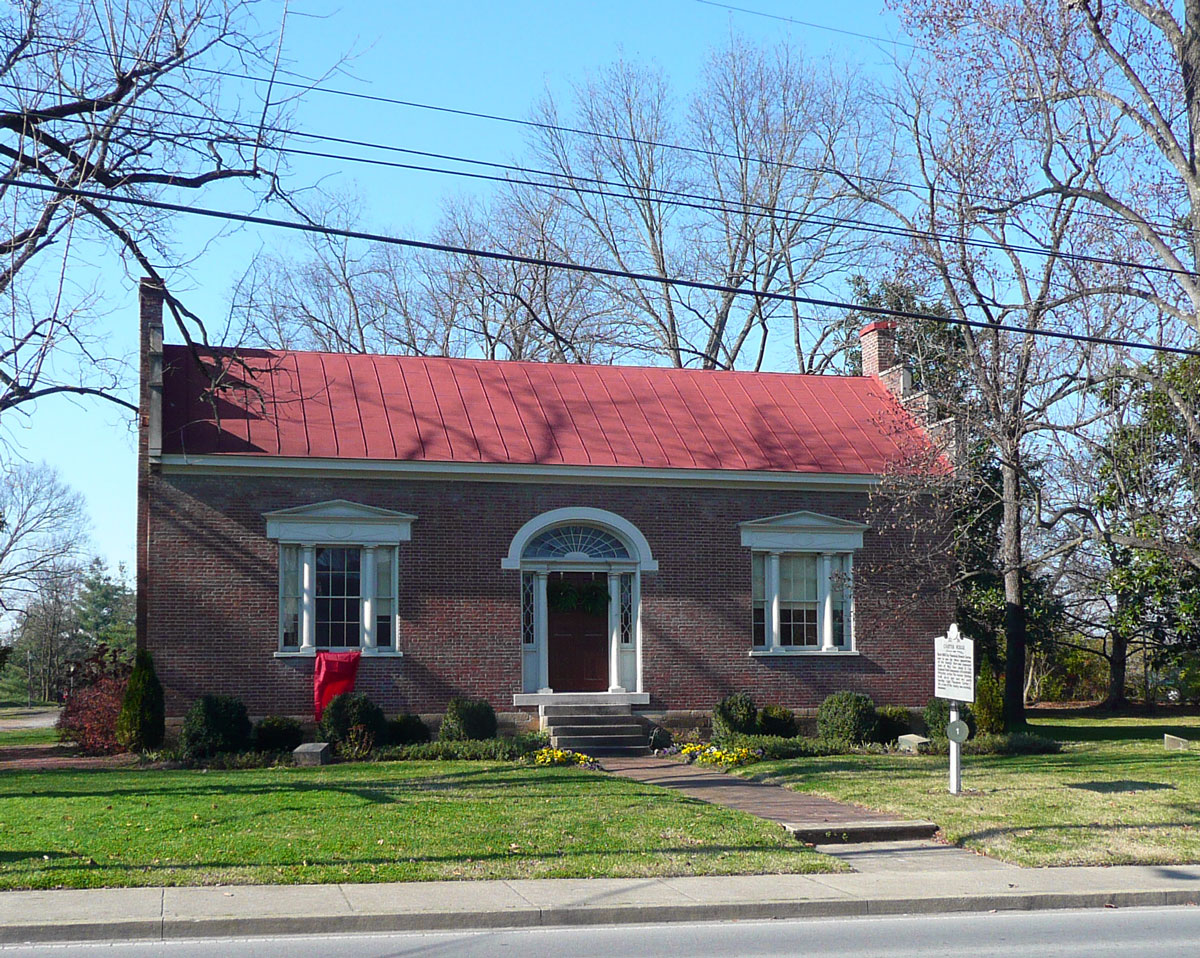
- Carter House

- Location within Tennessee Location within the United States
- Location: Franklin, Tennessee
- Coordinates: 35°54′13″N 86°51′58″W
- Part of: Franklin Battlefield (ID66000734)
- Designated CP: December 19, 1960

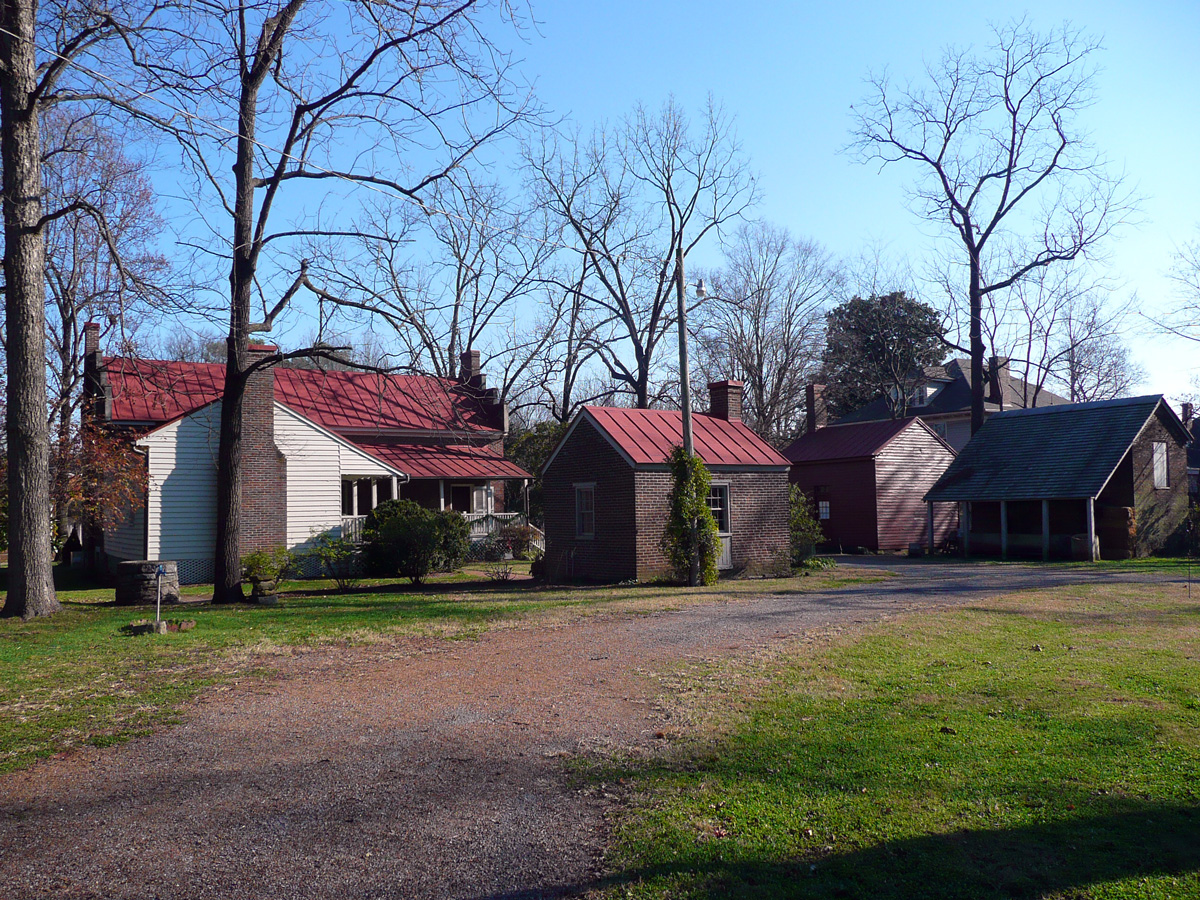
Rear view of Carter House (left) and outbuildings

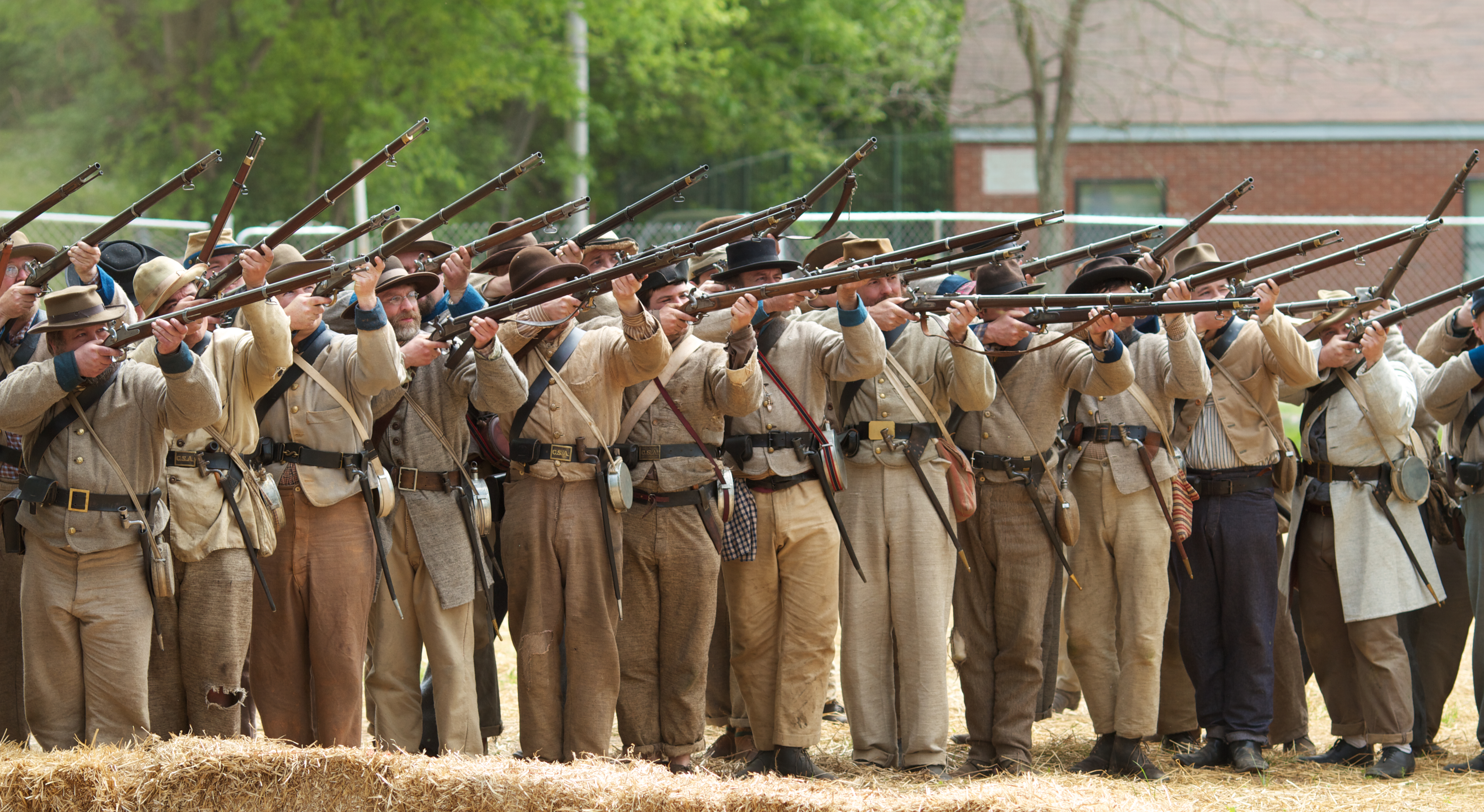
Battle of Franklin reenactment, 2010, Carter House

The Carter House State Historic Site is a historic house at 1140 Columbia Avenue in Franklin, Tennessee. In that house, the Carter family hid in the basement waiting for the second Battle of Franklin to end. It is a Tennessee Historical Commission State Historic Site, managed by the non-profit organization The Battle of Franklin Trust under an agreement with the Tennessee Historical Commission. The house is a contributing property and centerpiece of the Franklin Battlefield, a U.S. National Historic Landmark historic district.

Fountain Branch Carter completed construction of the house in 1830. The federal style brick farm house was accompanied by several other outbuildings such as the farm office, smokehouse, and kitchen. In the 1850s, Carter built a cotton gin on his property that became a much-remembered landmark during the Second Battle of Franklin in 1864. Though the cotton gin no longer stands, the house and the other three buildings are still intact and illustrate the horror of the Civil War battle with over a thousand bullet holes still visible.

The Carter House played a very important role in the Second Battle of Franklin. Prior to the fight, the house was taken over as the headquarters of the Twenty-Third Army Corps commanded by Brigadier General Jacob D. Cox. Federal breastworks were erected just south of the home extending to both the east and west of Columbia Pike. The Carter family took refuge in the basement of their home during the battle.

The middle son of Fountain Branch Carter, Tod Carter, was mortally wounded in the battle. He was still alive the morning after the battle when he was found and brought to the house. There he lived for several more hours, surrounded by his distraught family. Tod Carter died of his wounds December 2, 1864, and was buried in Rest Haven Cemetery just north of town. He came home for the first time in over three years when he fought at the Battle of Franklin in the 20th Tennessee Infantry. The room where Tod Carter died is one of the highlights of the guided tour of the home today.

Tours of the Carter House and grounds are available daily. The State of Tennessee has owned the house since it was purchased to save it from demolition in 1953. As one of the Tennessee Historical Commission's 18 State Historic Sites, the property is administered by the Battle of Franklin Trust, a non-profit organization that also oversees Carnton Plantation.

== See also ==
- Winstead Hill, also NRHP-listed within the Franklin Battlefield area
- Carnton, also NRHP-listed in the battlefield
- Fort Granger, also NRHP-listed in the battlefield
- Lotz House, also NRHP-listed in the battlefield
