= Lake Shawnee, West Virginia =

- Unincorporated community
- Location within the state of West Virginia Lake Shawnee, West Virginia (the United States)
- Coordinates: 37°24′28″N 81°08′26″W
- Country: United States
- State: West Virginia
- County: Mercer
- Elevation: 2,077 ft (633 m)
- Time zone: UTC-5 (Eastern (EST))
  - Summer (DST): UTC-4 (EDT)
- Area codes: 304 & 681
- GNIS feature ID: 1557242

Lake Shawnee is an unincorporated community in Mercer County, West Virginia, United States. Lake Shawnee is located along U.S. Route 19, 3.5 miles (5.6 km) northwest of Princeton.

Lake Shawnee Amusement Park, abandoned in 1966, occupies a desecrated native burial ground which was the site of the 1783 Mitchell Clay settler farm. Three of the Clay children (Bartley, Tabitha, Ezekial) were killed by a band of natives; Mitchell Clay led a group of settlers in bloody retaliation, killing several natives. In the 1920s, businessman Conley T. Snidow purchased the site of the Clay farm for development as an amusement park. At least six amusement patrons were killed while the park was in operation; a little girl on the circling swing set was hit after a truck backed into the path of the swing, and a boy drowned in the amusement park's swimming pond. The park's structures and rides are still standing, abandoned and in disrepair. Tours are offered in the days leading up to Halloween, in which the site is described as being "cursed" or "haunted".
