= The Devil's Tree =

Oak in New Jersey, United States

Coordinates: 40.6300°N 74.5831°W

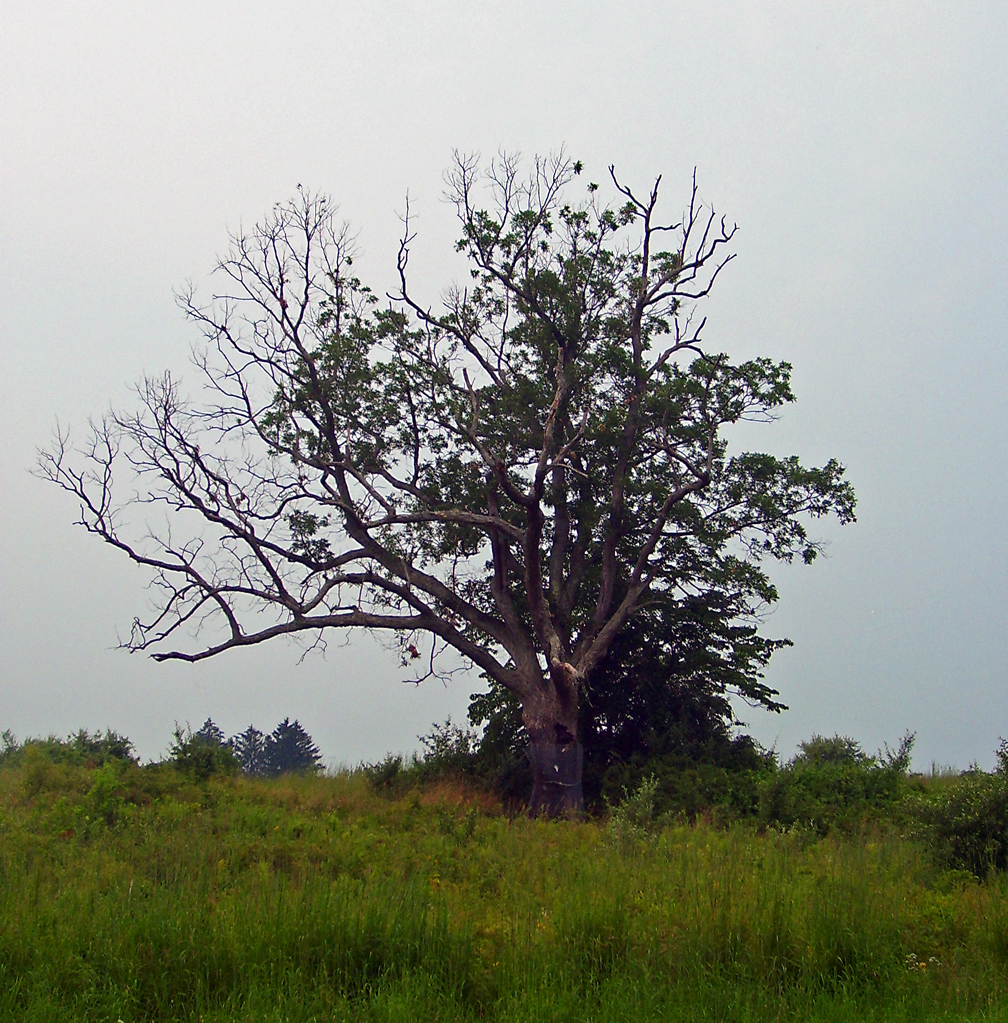
The Devil's Tree in 2006

The Devil's Tree is a solitary oak tree, with some dead limbs, growing in an undeveloped field on Mountain Road in the Martinsville section of Bernards Township in Somerset County, New Jersey, United States, across from a private housing development. Local legend suggests the tree is cursed: those who damage or disrespect the tree (usually by urinating on it, or making disparaging remarks about it while nearby) will soon thereafter come to some sort of harm, often in the form of a car accident or major breakdown as they leave.

== Claims ==
Various legends surround the tree. A common claim is that Bernards Township was one of the central headquarters for the Ku Klux Klan in New Jersey and that the tree had been used to lynch Africans and rebellious slaves since colonial times. Another claim is that a farmer hanged himself from the tree after killing his family and that anyone trying to cut the tree down will "come to an untimely end". Other legends surrounding the tree allege that visitors who get too close to the tree will get chased by a black Ford pickup truck that will then disappear at a certain point, or that anyone who touches the tree will find that their hands have turned black if they try to eat at a restaurant.

In winter, the ground beneath the tree is allegedly free from snow, no matter how much has fallen or how recently. A nearby boulder called "Heat Rock", and sometimes the tree itself, are said to be warm to the touch regardless of the season or time of day, and is claimed to be a portal to hell.

== Protection ==
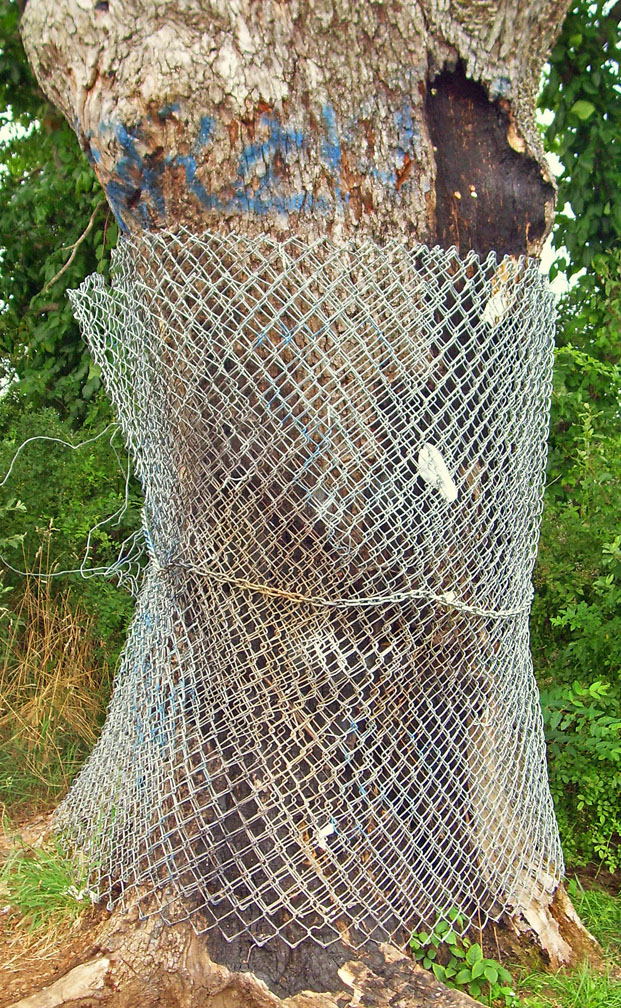
Chain-link fence around the trunk

The township's plans to develop the land where the tree is located might have required its removal, but the township decided to protect the tree and keep it intact. In 2007, a sign was posted at the site stating when it is open to the public. The Devil's Tree was surrounded by a chain-link fence following vandalism. A local family also tried to reduce the damage by irresponsible visitors by chasing them away with their pickup, which subsequently gave rise to the legend of a haunted truck that guards the tree.

== See also ==
- List of individual trees
