= Franklin Battlefield =

- U.S. National Register of Historic Places
- U.S. National Historic Landmark District
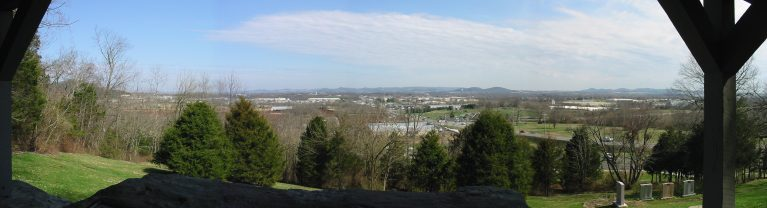
- View of the battlefield from atop Winstead Hill, which served as General Hood's headquarters

- Location within Tennessee Location within the United States
- Location: Franklin, Tennessee
- Coordinates: 35°54′13″N 86°51′58″W
- Architectural style: Greek Revival, Federal
- NRHP reference No.: 66000734

Significant dates
- Added to NRHP: October 15, 1966
- Designated NHLD: December 19, 1960

Franklin Battlefield was the site of the Second Battle of Franklin, which occurred late in the American Civil War. It is located in the southern part of Franklin, Tennessee, on U.S. 31. It was declared a National Historic Landmark in 1960.

The Carter House, which stands today and is open to visitors, was located at the center of the Union position. The site covers about 15 acres (61,000 m^{2}). The house and outbuildings still show hundreds of bullet holes. Across the street from the Carter house, the Lotz House was similarly damaged, and the Lotz family huddled in the Carter House basement while the battle raged above. The Carnton Plantation, home to the McGavock family during the battle, also still stands and is likewise open to the public. Confederate soldiers swept past Carnton toward the left wing of the Union army, and the house and outbuildings were converted into the largest field hospital present after the battle. Adjacent to Carnton is the McGavock Confederate Cemetery, where 1,481 Southern soldiers killed in the battle are buried.

Adjacent to the 48 acres (190,000 m^{2}) surrounding Carnton is another 110 acres (0.45 km^{2}) of battlefield, which is currently being converted to a city park. Much of the rest of the Franklin battlefield has been lost to commercial development. The spot where Gen. Patrick Cleburne fell, for instance, was covered until late 2005 by a Pizza Hut restaurant. Although the restaurant was purchased by a preservation group and demolished, the Civil War Preservation Trust continues to rank the Franklin battlefield as one of the ten most endangered sites. City officials and historic-preservation groups have recently placed a new emphasis on saving what remains of the land over which this terrible battle raged.

Fort Granger is preserved in a 20-acre (8.1 ha) section that is listed on the National Register of Historic Places.

The battlefield is now preserved as part of the 110-acre (45 ha) Eastern Flank Battle Park, which is operated by the city of Franklin.

== See also ==
- List of National Historic Landmarks in Tennessee
- National Register of Historic Places listings in Williamson County, Tennessee
