= Carnton =

Historic house in Tennessee, United States

- U.S. National Register of Historic Places
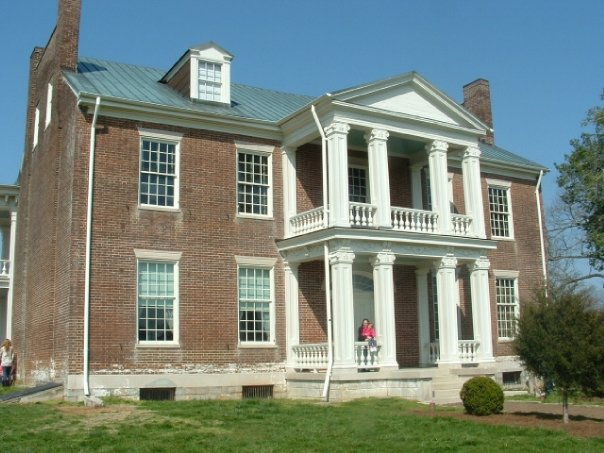
- Carnton

- Location within Tennessee Location within the United States
- Location: 1345 Eastern Flank Circle, Franklin, Tennessee
- Coordinates: 35.90309°N 86.85834°W
- Area: 48 acres (19 ha)
- Built: 1826
- Architectural style: Federal; Greek Revival
- NRHP reference No.: 73001857
- Added to NRHP: January 18, 1973

Carnton is a historic plantation home built in 1826 in Franklin, Williamson County, Tennessee, United States. The property, comprising 1,420 acres (5.7 km^{2}), played an important role during and immediately after the Battle of Franklin during the American Civil War. Carnton was situated less than one mile (1.6 km) from the location of the 1864 battle's Union Army eastern flank, and it became the principal temporary field hospital for tending the wounded. More than 1,750 Confederate soldiers lost their lives at Franklin, and on Carnton's back porch four deceased Confederate generals' bodies were laid out for a few hours after the battle. The life of Carrie McGavock, who lived at Carnton during the civil war, was the subject of a best-selling novel in 2005 by Robert Hicks, entitled The Widow of the South. The house was listed on the National Register of Historic Places in 1973, and became a museum managed by The Battle of Franklin Trust, a non-profit organization.

== Mansion and grounds ==
=== Architecture ===
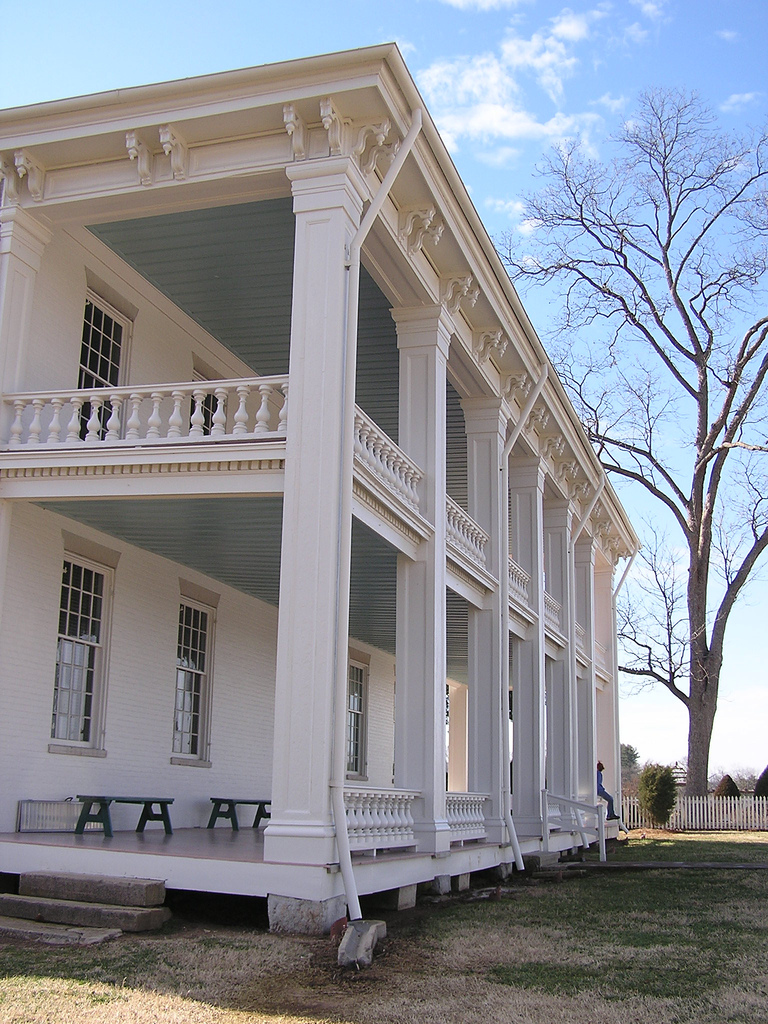
Carnton's Greek Revival style back porch

Carnton is a red brick Federal-style 11-room residence, that was completed in 1826 by Randal McGavock using slave labor. Built on a raised limestone foundation, the southern facing entrance façade is a two-story, five-bay block with a side-facing gabled roof, covered in tin, with two dormer windows, and slightly projecting end chimneys. A central two-story pedimented portico in the Greek Revival-style was added in 1847 by McGavock's son John McGavock. The two-story portico contains four, square Ionic columns with beveled recessed panels, and a simple vase shape balustrade on each level. The balustrade encloses the second-story balcony. Decorative corbels and scrollwork are found on the fascia above the first level, and the columns at the corners of the portico are matched by pilasters on the front façade. The doorway is flanked by engaged columns and sidelights, with a semi-circular fanlight above. A two-level Greek Revival gallery with seven two-story Doric columns, and using the same balustrade as seen on the front portico, is located on the rear of the house. The gallery runs the length of the house, extending at one end to take advantage of southerly breezes.

=== Interior ===
The interior has Greek Revival touches due to the remodeling done by John McGavock in 1847, including then-fashionable wallpapers, faux-painting and carpets in most every room. Three distinct wallpaper patterns have been discovered on the third floor. The central passage downstairs appears much as it did in 1864 during the Civil War. The wallpaper design, though a reproduction, is based on a popular design for the time. The parlor also saw a Greek Revival upgrade in the form of a fireplace mantel, new wallpaper and carpeting. The working clock on the parlor mantel and the 200-piece china set in the dining room is original to the McGavock family, as well as a rocking chair given by President Andrew Jackson. Many of the floors in Carnton are stained due to the house being used as Confederate hospital after the Battle of Franklin. The heaviest stains are found in one of the southern facing bedrooms which was used as an operating room, as a result of the blood soaking through the carpets and seeping into the wood floors.

=== Grounds ===
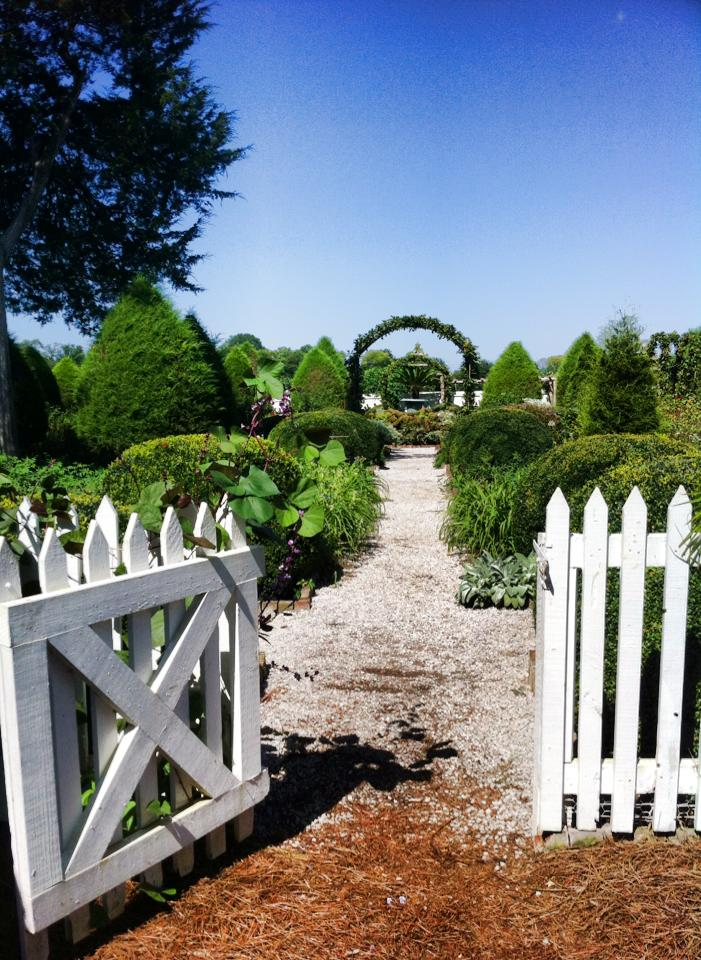
Garden at Carnton

Randal McGavock planted cedars along the driveway leading up to the house, while his son extended the planting of cedars and boxwood along the herringbone patterned brick walkway that he had installed between the portico and the driveway. In preparation for his marriage in 1847 to Carrie Winder, John McGavock created a 1-acre (0.40 ha) garden to the west of the house based on the writings of Andrew Jackson Downing, the "father of American landscape architecture." The working garden had vegetable squares, each surrounded by ornamental borders, but the presence of a large Osage orange tree in the center of the southeast quadrant suggests that vegetable growing was eventually discontinued in garden plots nearest the house. The garden was surrounded by a white picket fence as well as a high board fence on the north side, to protect the plants from animals and severe weather. The fence also gave a degree of privacy to the occupants of the house from the outbuildings and the many slaves moving about on the grounds.

The garden was neglected throughout the 20th-century, but enough physical evidence remained through archeological research, photographs and letters to indicate its extent and layout, that the garden was recreated in 1996–97 to how it looked in 1869. The daffodil, hosta, and peony collection is composed entirely of varieties available in Middle Tennessee prior to 1869. Carnton is believed to house the largest historic daffodil collection in the South, representing 40 varieties in use before 1869.

==== McGavock Confederate Cemetery ====
To the northwest of the house on a 2-acre (0.81 ha) section of the property is the McGavock Confederate Cemetery, the largest privately owned military cemetery in the United States. Donated by the McGavock family as a permanent burial ground for the soldiers killed in the Battle of Franklin, the cemetery is organized by state resulting in thirteen sections separated by a 14-foot (4.3 m) pathway. The cemetery is maintained by The Franklin Chapter of the United Daughters of the Confederacy.

== History ==
=== 19th century ===
Randal McGavock (1768-1843), migrated from Virginia and settled in Nashville, Tennessee becoming a prominent local politician. He served as Mayor of Nashville for a one-year term in 1824 and was acquainted with President James K. Polk and good friends with President Andrew Jackson, who resided at The Hermitage near Nashville. Jackson was a guest of the McGavocks on more than one occasion. McGavock named his property near Franklin after his father's birthplace in County Antrim, Ireland. The name "Carnton" was derived from the Gaelic word cairn which means "a pile of stones." A cairn sometimes marks a burial site.

The first construction at Carnton was a smokehouse constructed in 1815 that was adjoined to the main house built in 1826 by a two-story kitchen wing. The mansion sat on 1,400 acres (6 km^{2}) of which 500 acres (2 km^{2}) was used for farming. Among the crops the McGavocks grew in the mid-19th century in middle Tennessee were wheat, corn, oats, hay, and potatoes. The McGavocks were also involved in raising and breeding livestock and thoroughbred horses. Randal McGavock's daughter, Elizabeth, married William Giles Harding of Belle Meade Plantation that became an internationally renowned thoroughbred farm.

Randal McGavock died in 1843, leaving Carnton to his son John (1815–1893). In December 1848, John married his cousin Carrie Winder (1829–1905) of Ducros Plantation in Thibodaux, Louisiana. Carrie Winder McGavock became the subject of a 2005 Robert Hicks novel entitled "The Widow of the South" based on her life. The book became a New York Times bestseller. She brought with her the slave Mariah Reddick. The couple had five children but only two would survive to adulthood. Upon marriage the McGavocks started renovating the house, preferring the then fashionable Greek Revival-style. Just prior to the Civil War, John McGavock's net worth was about $339,000 in 1860, which is about $6 million in 2007 dollars.

==== Battle of Franklin ====
John McGavock was 46 when the Civil War began and was too old to enlist, but he helped outfit and organize groups of Southern soldiers. Carrie contributed to the war effort by sewing uniforms for relatives and friends. As the war got closer to home, John McGavock sent most of his slaves to Louisiana so they wouldn't be taken by Federal authorities. When Federal troops took control of Middle Tennessee, and learned of the McGavocks' efforts to aid the South, they took thousands of dollars' worth of grain, horses, cattle and timber from the plantation.

On November 30, 1864, Carnton became the largest temporary field hospital for tending the wounded and dying after the Battle of Franklin. The home was situated less than one mile (1.6 km) from the location of the activity that took place on the far Union Eastern flank. More than 1,750 Confederates lost their lives at Franklin, and on Carnton's back porch four Confederate generals' bodies—Patrick Cleburne, John Adams, Otho F. Strahl and Hiram B. Granbury—were laid out for a few hours after the battle.

The McGavocks tended for as many as 300 soldiers inside Carnton alone, though at least 150 died the first night. Hundreds more were spread throughout the rest of the property, including in the slave cabins. Carrie McGavock donated food, clothing and supplies to care for the wounded and dying, and witnesses say her dress was blood soaked at the bottom. Carrie's two children, Hattie (then nine) and son Winder (then seven) witnessed the carnage as well, providing some basic assistance to the surgeons.

McGavock Cemetery with Carnton in background

After the battle, on December 1, Union forces under Maj. Gen. John M. Schofield evacuated toward Nashville, leaving all the dead, including several hundred Union soldiers, and the wounded who were unable to walk as well. The residents of Franklin were then faced with the task of burying over 2,500 soldiers, most of those being Confederates. According to George Cowan's "History of McGavock Confederate Cemetery," "All of the Confederate dead were buried as nearly as possible by states, close to where they fell, and wooden headboards were placed at each grave with the name, company and regiment painted or written on them." Many of the Union soldiers were re-interred in 1865 at the Stones River National Cemetery in Murfreesboro, Tennessee.

Over the next eighteen months many of the markers were either rotting or used for firewood, and the writing on the boards was disappearing. To preserve the graves, John and Carrie McGavock donated 2 acres (8,100 m^{2}) of their property to be designated as an area for the Confederate dead to be re-interred. The citizens of Franklin raised the funding and the soldiers were exhumed and reburied in the McGavock Confederate Cemetery for the sum of $5.00 per soldier. A team of individuals led by George Cuppett took responsibility for the reburial operation of 1,481 soldiers, and one civilian, Marcellus Cuppett, George's brother who had died during the process of the reburials, in the spring of 1866. The original names and identities of the soldiers were recorded in a cemetery record book by Cuppett, and the book fell into the watchful hands of Carrie McGavock after the reinterments.

After the war, McGavock continued to farm Carnton under sharecropping arrangements with former slaves until his death in 1893.

=== 20th century ===
Carrie McGavock managed the maintenance of the cemetery with African-American workers for 41 years until her death in 1905. A prayer in the Confederate Veteran magazine mentioned Carrie McGavock in 1905:

We thank thee for the . . . feeble knees she lifted up, for the many hearts she comforted, the needy ones she supplied, the sick she ministered unto, and the boys she found in abject want and mothered and reared into worthy manhood. In the last day they will rise up and call her blessed. Today she is not, because thou hast taken her; and we are left to sorrow for the Good Samaritan of Williamson County, a name richly merited by her.

— Rev. John W. Hanner

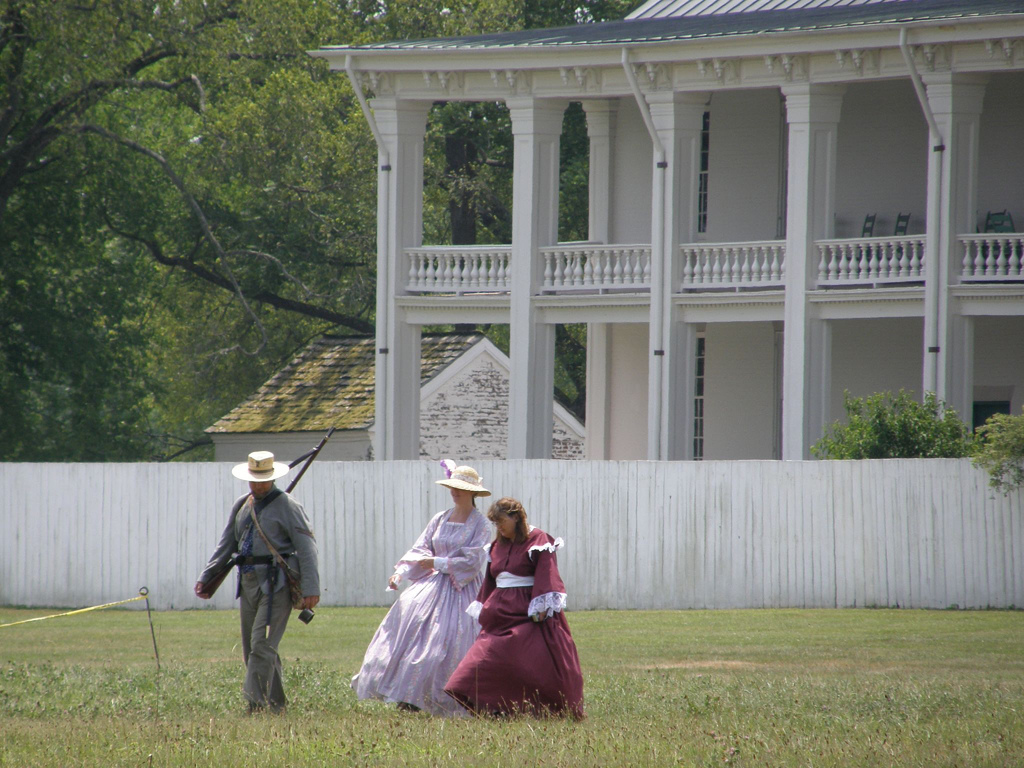
Living history re-enactors

The McGavock's son, Winder, inherited the home on the death of his mother, however he died only two years later in 1907. His widow and children then left Carnton and moved into Franklin. In 1909, the eastern kitchen wing of the house was destroyed by a tornado, and the roofline can still be clearly seen where it abutted the mansion. Winder's widow sold the house in 1911 ending a century of family ownership. Carnton then passed through the hands of several owners, and by the late 1960s and 1970s, the property was in disrepair. In 1977, the Carnton Association was formed to raise money to buy, restore and maintain the mansion. The following year, the house and ten acres were given to the association by Dr. and Mrs. W.D. Sugg who had owned the property since the 1950s. Subsequently, the Association acquired an additional 38 acres (150,000 m^{2}), and began a restoration of the house and grounds that were completed by the late 1990s.

=== 21st century ===
Listed on the National Register of Historic Places in 1973, Carnton has never received any funding or support from local, state or the Federal government. The site is maintained and managed by The Battle of Franklin Trust, a non-profit organization which also manages another historic Battle of Franklin historic home, the Carter House. Today, Carnton receives visitors from all over the world as many people visit to learn the true story of the Widow of the South, Carrie McGavock.

== In popular culture ==
- The Widow of the South (2005) Carnton is the setting for the novel by author Robert Hicks.

== See also ==
- Winstead Hill, also NRHP-listed within the Franklin Battlefield area
- Fountain Carter House, also NRHP-listed in the battlefield
- Fort Granger, also NRHP-listed in the battlefield
- Claiborne Kinnard House NRHP listed in the battlefield
