= William Giles Harding =

American general and planter (1808–1886)

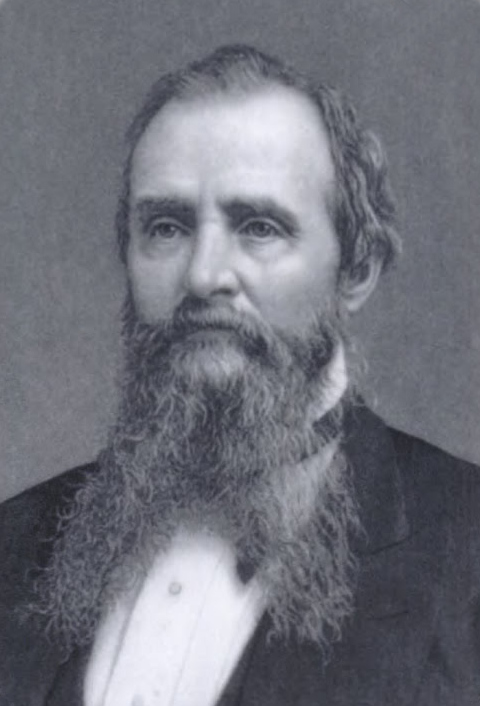
- Portrait of William Giles Harding
- Born: 1808; Belle Meade, Tennessee, U.S.
- Died: December 15, 1886 (aged 77–78); Nashville, Tennessee, U.S.
- Education: University of Nashville Norwich University
- Occupation: Planter
- Spouses: Mary Selena McNairy; Elizabeth Irwin McGavock
- Children: John Harding II; Selene Harding; Mary Elizabeth Harding
- Parent: John Harding
- Relatives: William Hicks Jackson (son-in-law), Howell Edmunds Jackson (son-in-law)
- Military career
- Allegiance: Confederate States of America (1861–1865)
- Branch: Confederate States Army
- Service years: 1861–1865
- Rank: Brigadier General (CSA)

William Giles Harding (1808 – December 15, 1886) was a Southern planter, attorney, and horse breeder who was made a Brigadier General in the Tennessee militia before the American Civil War. He took over operations of Belle Meade Plantation near Nashville from his father in 1839. During the course of his management, he acquired more property, expanding it from 1300 acres to 5,400 acres (22 km^{2}) in 1860. He specialized in breeding and raising Thoroughbred horses, as well as other purebred livestock. In 1862 after Union forces took over Nashville, Harding was arrested as a leader and imprisoned at Fort Mackinac in northern Michigan on Mackinac Island for six months. He was released on a $20,000 bond. After being imprisoned at Fort Mackinac, he took the oath of allegiance to the Union and did not take an active part in the conflict from 1862 onwards.

Following his daughter Selene's marriage to William Hicks Jackson, Harding collaborated with his son-in-law to co-manage the Belle Meade plantation through much of the late 19th century. It flourished as a center for high-quality racehorses and other livestock. After Jackson's death in 1903, the executor of the estate sold most of the plantation to a land development company in 1906 because of debt. Development from 1938 created a residential suburb known as the independent city of Belle Meade, Tennessee, near Nashville.

Used as a private residence until 1953, the mansion, with 30 acres and associated outbuildings, was bought by the state for preservation. This property is now operated as a museum known as Belle Meade Plantation, and is listed on the National Register of Historic Places.

== Early life ==
William Giles Harding was born in 1808 near Nashville, Tennessee to John Harding, a Virginian, who one year earlier (1807) purchased 250 acres (1.0 km^{2}) near Richland Creek. He was educated at the old University of Nashville, the Partridge's American Literary, Scientific and Military Academy at Norwich University, Northfield, VT, and he studied law in Litchfield, Connecticut.

== Career ==
After college, Harding settled at his father's McSpadden's Bend (now known as Pennington Bend) property, River Farm, which his father had bought for him. It was located between the Stones and Cumberland rivers in Nashville. He had married Mary Selena McNairy in 1829. They had a son together, John Harding II, before she died of yellow fever in the epidemic of 1837. It caused many deaths in towns along the waterways of the South.

In 1839 at the age of 31, Harding took over management of the Belle Meade Plantation, which then consisted of 1300 acres. His father was working with some of the enslaved from Belle Meade in Mississippi County, Arkansas, where at the age of 60 he was developing a 10,000-acre cotton plantation near Plum Point Bend along the Mississippi River.

In 1840 the widower Harding married Elizabeth McGavock, daughter of Randal McGavock, a former mayor of Nashville. They had daughters Selene and Mary Elizabeth Harding together.

Harding acquired additional property around Belle Meade, enlarging the plantation to 5300 acres by 1850. In the census that year his father was recorded as the third-largest enslaver in Davidson County, Tennessee, holding 93 enslaved persons at Belle Meade and 34 at McSpadden's Bend plantation, named Bellevue.

At the age of forty-five, from 1853 to 1854, Harding began construction of a larger Greek Revival mansion on the Belle Meade Plantation that incorporated some of his father's brick house. It later became known as the Belle Meade Mansion (listed on the National Register of Historic Places since December 30, 1969).

While Harding raced some of his horses, he was most interested in the practice of breeding high-quality blood stock. He also raised purebred cattle, sheep, and cashmere goats. In 1856, he served as the President of the Nashville Jockey Club. He enslaved 136 people at Belle Meade in 1860. He began a practice of holding yearling sales at Belle Meade, which attracted attention to the quality of his horses.

Harding was a staunch supporter of the Confederate States of America and donated US$500,000 to the Confederate States Army to support the war. Prior to the American Civil War of 1861–1865, he had attained the rank of Brigadier General in the Tennessee State Militia. He headed the Military and Financial Board of Tennessee at the beginning of the Civil War, until his arrest by Union authorities in 1862 after Union forces took over the state and occupied it. Harding was imprisoned by Federal authorities in Fort Mackinac on Mackinac Island in Lake Huron, Michigan for six months.

While he was imprisoned, Elizabeth Harding worried about supporting all the people at Belle Meade. In addition to her own family of three, her sister Mary McGavock Southall; stock manager William Hague; farm manager James Beasley and his family of seven; Rachael Noris, a free mulatto woman; and 137 enslaved were all living at Belle Meade. Harding was released on $20,000 bond and returned to Nashville.

After the Civil War, Harding inherited the plantation after his father died in 1867. He adapted to the emancipation of the enslaved and paying them for work. While some 72 freedmen chose to continue to work for him, only 15 were living on the plantation in 1870. Some moved to a nearby African-American community that formed and was known as Tolbert. It still exists.

Harding agreed to the marriage of his daughter Selene to the widower William Hicks Jackson, a Confederate general, if the couple lived at Belle Meade Plantation. After that, he co-managed the property with his son-in-law. The Harding-Jackson men became world-renowned Thoroughbred horse breeders, later purchasing a top stallion named Iroquois (1878–1899); in 1881 he had been the first American horse to win the prestigious English Epsom Derby.

== People He Enslaved ==
According to the Nashville Public Library’s Enslaved and Free People of Color Database, Giles Harding is recorded as having enslaved the following people. Their ages, when known, and the year the record was created are included.

- Hannah – 1803
- Tom – 1803
- Dick – 1803
- Cate – 1803
- Davy – 1803
- Ellick – 1803
- Sylvia – 1803
- George – 1803
- Hanner – 1803
- Nancy – 1803
- Sam – 1803
- Tamer – 1803
- Will – 1803
- Nelly – 1803
- Bob – 1803
- Bet – 1803
- Charlotte – 1803
- Moses – 1803
- Harry – 1803
- Rachel – 1803
- Sarah – 1803
- Frank – 1803
- Abram – 1803
- Patience – 1803
- Joe – 1803
- Charles – 1803
- Maria – 1803
- Little Bob – 1803
- Jack – 1803
- Jenny – 1803
- Venus – 1803
- Isaac – 1803
- Peter – 1803
- Daniel – 1803
- Henry – 1803
- Polly – 1803
- Jude – 1803
- Peggy – 1803
- William – 1803
- Nancy (16) – 1804
- John – 1804
- Moses – 1804
- Matilda – 1804
- Kitty – 1804
- Phil – 1804
- Solomon – 1804
- Lucy – 1804
- Simon – 1804
- Sukey – 1804
- Dinah – 1804
- Peggy – 1804
- Mary – 1804
- Tom – 1804
- Jenny – 1804
- Ellick – 1804
- Frank – 1804
- Harry – 1804
- Charlotte – 1804

== Personal life ==
In 1829 Harding married Mary Selena McNairy, and they had a son, John Harding II. She died in 1837 in the yellow fever epidemic that affected much of the region.

He married again to Elizabeth Irwin McGavock, daughter of Randal McGavock (1766–1843) and his wife. Her father served as Mayor of Nashville from 1824 to 1825 and owned the Carnton plantation in Franklin, Tennessee. They had two daughters, Selene and Mary Elizabeth.

After the Civil War, his daughter Selene Harding married Confederate General William Hicks Jackson, commonly known as General "Red" Jackson. He was the son of Dr. Alexander Jackson and Mary W. Hurt Jackson.

His older brother was Howell Edmunds Jackson, an attorney and politician. After Howell's first wife Sophia Malloy died in 1873, perhaps in the cholera epidemic, Howell also married into the Harding family: to Mary Elizabeth, Selene's sister. He worked with his brother on the horse breeding operation. He was elected by the state legislature to serve as United States Senator from Tennessee, serving from 1881 to 1886. Later in life, he was appointed as a Justice of the Supreme Court of the United States, serving from 1893 to 1895.

== Death and legacy ==
Harding died on December 15, 1886. His obituary in the Chattanooga Times Free Press called him 'a monarch in his own domain'. First interred in the mausoleum on the plantation, his remains and those of other family were removed and reinterred in a family plot at Mount Olivet Cemetery in Nashville, Tennessee after the 1906 sale of the plantation.

After his death, the Belle Meade Estate went in equal shares to his three children:

- John Harding II. His first wife, Sophia W. Merritt, whom he married in 1853, died in 1855. He married his second wife, Margaret A. L. Owen, in December 1856.
- Mary Elizabeth (Harding), General Harding's second daughter, and her husband Howell Edmunds Jackson (8 April 1832 – 8 August 1895). They lived in West Meade, which they built in 1886 after Harding had given them a tract of 2,600 acres.
- Selene (Harding) and her husband General William Hicks Jackson (1835–1903). They had a son named William Harding Jackson Sr. (1874–1903), who married Anne (Davis) Richardson (1897–1950). They also had a daughter named Selene Harding Jackson (1876–1913), who married William Robert Elliston. She was known as Selene Elliston.

"Red" Jackson and his brother Howell took over co-management of the Belle Meade Plantation. "Red" Jackson later bought out his brother's interest.

In 1903, after William Harding Jackson Sr. died following his father, his son William Harding Jackson (1901–1971) and daughter Selene (Jackson) Elliston inherited the Belle Meade Estate. James B. Richardson, Jackson's maternal grandfather, was named Executor of the estate. He sold the plantation in 1906 because of debt. The younger Jackson became an attorney who served in US Army intelligence during World War II and contributed to the formation of the CIA, modeled after the British OSS. He later served as the deputy director of the Central Intelligence Agency from October 7, 1950, to August 3, 1951, under President Harry S. Truman and as U.S. National Security Advisor to President Dwight D. Eisenhower in 1956.

Much of the large former Belle Meade plantation was developed as a residential suburb by a land company, starting in 1938; today that area is called Belle Meade and is an independent city. The mansion and 30 acres were reserved for use as a private residence until 1953, when it was purchased by the state of Tennessee. It is now operated as a museum and event space known as Belle Meade Plantation and was listed on the National Register of Historic Places.
