= Belle Meade Links =

Coordinates: 36.101°N 86.865°W

Belle Meade Links, more properly known as the Belle Meade Golf Links Historic District (or Belle Meade Links subdivision), in Nashville, Tennessee, USA, is one of the city's most historically significant residential enclaves. The neighborhood of 149 properties, characterized by curved streets, small parks, and Tudor Revival cottages, began in 1915 as one of the earliest subdivisions arising from the dissolution of the vast Belle Meade Plantation. It is an example of early 20th century “planned suburb” design. The neighborhood remains one of Nashville's few surviving examples of subdivision planning influenced by the Garden City Movement, a planning philosophy first outlined by Ebenezer Howard in his 1902 book Garden Cities of To-Morrow. The neighborhood was officially placed on the National Register of Historic Places on July 7, 2004.

== Early history ==
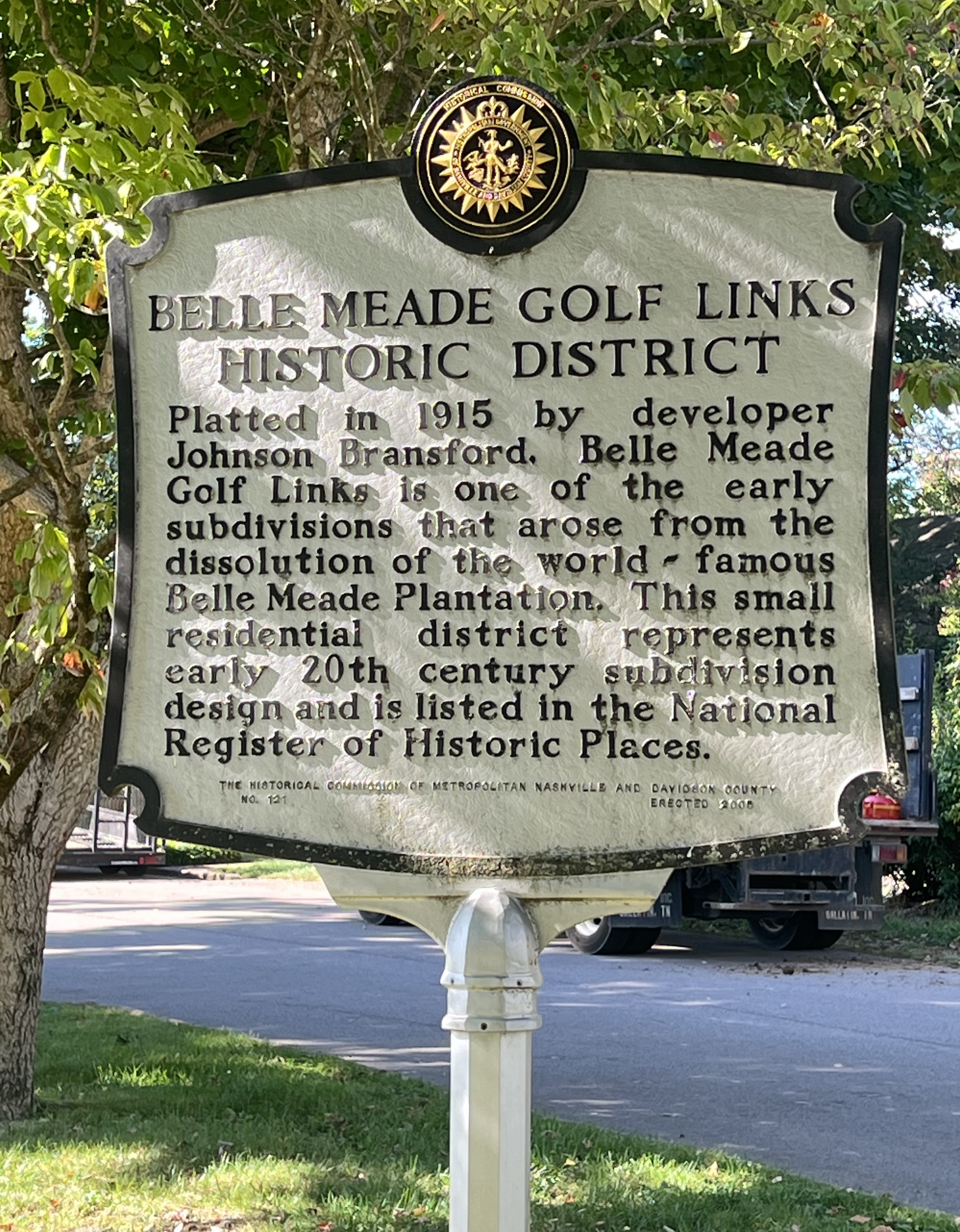
Belle Meade Links, Nashville, Tennessee, historical marker

In the early 20th century a unique real estate opportunity emerged in Nashville, Tennessee. On the west side of town, Belle Meade Plantation—an eight-square-mile estate nationally renowned for its thoroughbred horse breeding—was offered for sale after falling into financial distress. The vast property was divided into tracts that later became Cheekwood Botanical Gardens, Percy Warner Park, the city of Belle Meade, Belle Meade Country Club, and upscale residential developments.

In 1906, the Johnson Bransford Realty Company, acquired roughly 70 acres (28 ha) of land from the Belle Meade Land Company. Over the next nine years (1906–1915), Bransford methodically assembled contiguous parcels of two areas, Belle Meade Links and Deer Park, for a new residential subdivision. It was called the Belle Meade Golf Links— platted Nov. 17, 1915.

Simultaneously, another land company led by U.S. Senator Luke Lea envisioned building an upscale residential community adjoining Bransford's, but the offering was not attracting much interest. Lea recognized the prestige that would be added by having a country club and a golf course nearby. He offered to donate a 144 acres (58 ha) parcel that included Richland Creek to the Nashville Golf and Country Club, at the time located at the western edge of the city. The conditions were that the club agree to relocate about two miles further west to Lea's property, to build a clubhouse, and to establish an eighteen-hole golf course. On June 10, 1914, the members accepted the proposal despite complaints by some about the muddy unpaved roads and lack of a water line at the site. This move helped the aims of both Lea and Bransford; with the golf course surrounding a large portion of his project Bransford now began calling his development "Belle Meade Golf Links" to highlight the proximity of the golf course.

== Planning ==
Bransford knew he did not want a traditional grid with rectangular blocks of streets when he set out in the 1910s to develop the 42-acre (17ha) Belle Meade Links and the nearby Deer Park subdivision. He engaged landscape architects and city planners of national reputation— people who were familiar with Frederick Law Olmsted's models. He hired O.C. Simonds, with James Roy West as co-planner and engineer, to create a "garden suburb". Simonds, a Chicago-based landscape architect, is today considered a pioneer in the field of landscape architecture; He co-founded (with Olmstead) the American Society of Landscape Architects in 1889. It was a prestige move by Bransford that set his development apart from Nashville's grid neighborhoods.

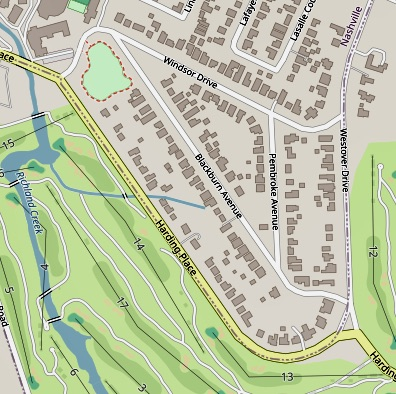
Belle Meade Links neighborhood map, Nashville, Tennessee (from OpenStreetMap)

Belle Meade Links was laid out according to principles of the Garden City Movement, an early twentieth-century planning philosophy emphasizing curving streets and integrated green space. The curved streets are rooted in 19th suburban cemetery plans with their curvilinear roads that hugged the topography. The movement had been promoted by British urban planner Ebenezer Howard in his 1902 work, Garden Cities of To-morrow, but in the U.S., the practical precedents came primarily from Olmsted. These curvilinear streets slowed traffic, and allowed green spaces. A variety of public spaces was created throughout the neighborhood.

Belle Meade Links' hallmarks included:

- Narrow, winding streets designed to discourage heavy traffic and create a park-like feel.
- Pocket parks and a central triangular commons, later called Belle Meade Links Triangle, as a focal point for community identity.
- Restrictive covenants written into the plats, ensuring that homes built within the subdivision adhered to stylistic and setback guidelines.

In the Links, there were three neighborhood parks designed for residents. One of these parks, today known as the Triangle Park, was established for the exclusive use of the subdivision. The other two were established for the private use of residents whose lots abutted them. While common areas have now become commonplace, in 1915 they were quite unusual.

Another aspect of the Links, a radical departure in the early twentieth century, was the use of restrictive covenants. The restrictive covenant was borrowed by Simonds from cemetery design. The Links restrictive covenants specified, among other things, certain setbacks from the street, “no swine,” and a prohibition on fencing except for those that were concealed by a hedge and were no higher than 4 feet.

The design choices of Bransford and Simonds have had lasting impact. The neighborhood has maintained its original scale and layout, shielding it from nearby commercial development along Harding Road.

== Architecture ==
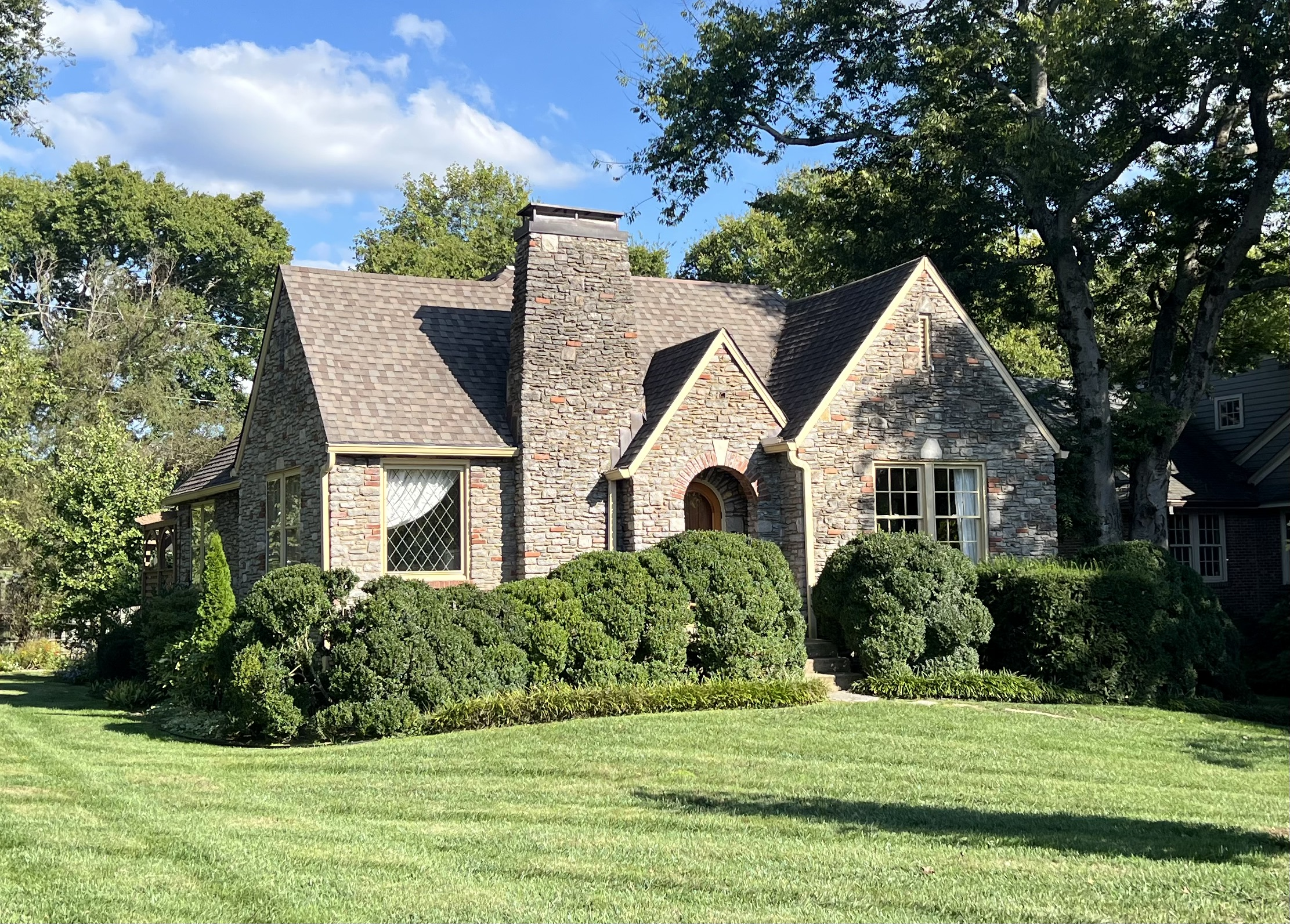
An example of Tudor Revival architecture in the Belle Meade Links neighborhood

Now influenced by the automobile, suburbs fulfilled the utopian vision of living in a pastoral setting, but close enough to the city to make a daily commute feasible. The houses constructed in Belle Meade Links in 1915 drew largely from the Arts and Crafts movement that was in fashion at the time. During the 1920s and 1930s, Tudor Revival architecture became more dominant (see example left). Tudor Revival cottages remained as defining features of Belle Meade Links, typified by steeply pitched roofs, entry porches with a round or Tudor arch, and a large front-facing gable. The choice of such Anglophile names as "Windsor, Pembroke, Westover" was perhaps to fit with an “English garden suburb” atmosphere.

== The Belle Meade Links–Harding Academy dispute ==
Around 2003, a legal dispute arose over zoning and historic preservation. Harding Academy, a private K–8 school, (founded 1971) located just across Windsor Drive from the Belle Meade Links, had become landlocked and needed space for athletic fields. School leaders began assembling 3.2 acres (1.3 ha) for this purpose by purchasing eight houses within Belle Meade Links between Blackburn Avenue and Harding Place. They spent about $3.5 million from 1991 to 2003, planning to demolish the houses for athletic fields. The school had previously tried to do something similar in 1998 at another park, Parmer Park, seeking permission to reserve a portion of the park for soccer and softball practices and home games in exchange for making improvements, but the measure failed.

Residents opposed the plan arguing that sports fields, if used for physical education classes and after-school sports, are really an extension of the school rather than a community park. They sought a conservation overlay to stop the project in order to protect the neighborhood's historic character. Harding secured demolition permits from Metro Codes, but the permits were shortly revoked under the “pending legislation doctrine,” since the overlay was already under consideration. Harding sued, claiming the revocations were invalid because the overlay had not yet been enacted. A chancery judge ordered the permits reinstated for use as a “park,” though demolition and redevelopment remained subject to overlay restrictions and design review. Harding ultimately regained its permits and demolished several houses, but the conservation overlay blocked further redevelopment. The land was ultimately used by the school to create "Kever Park" on Blackburn Avenue. The park is owned by the school and is closed to the public during school hours. As of 2025, the school relies on off-site athletic fields along Highway 70, about a mile away.
