= West Meade =

Historic house in Tennessee, United States

- West Meade (historic home)
- U.S. National Register of Historic Places
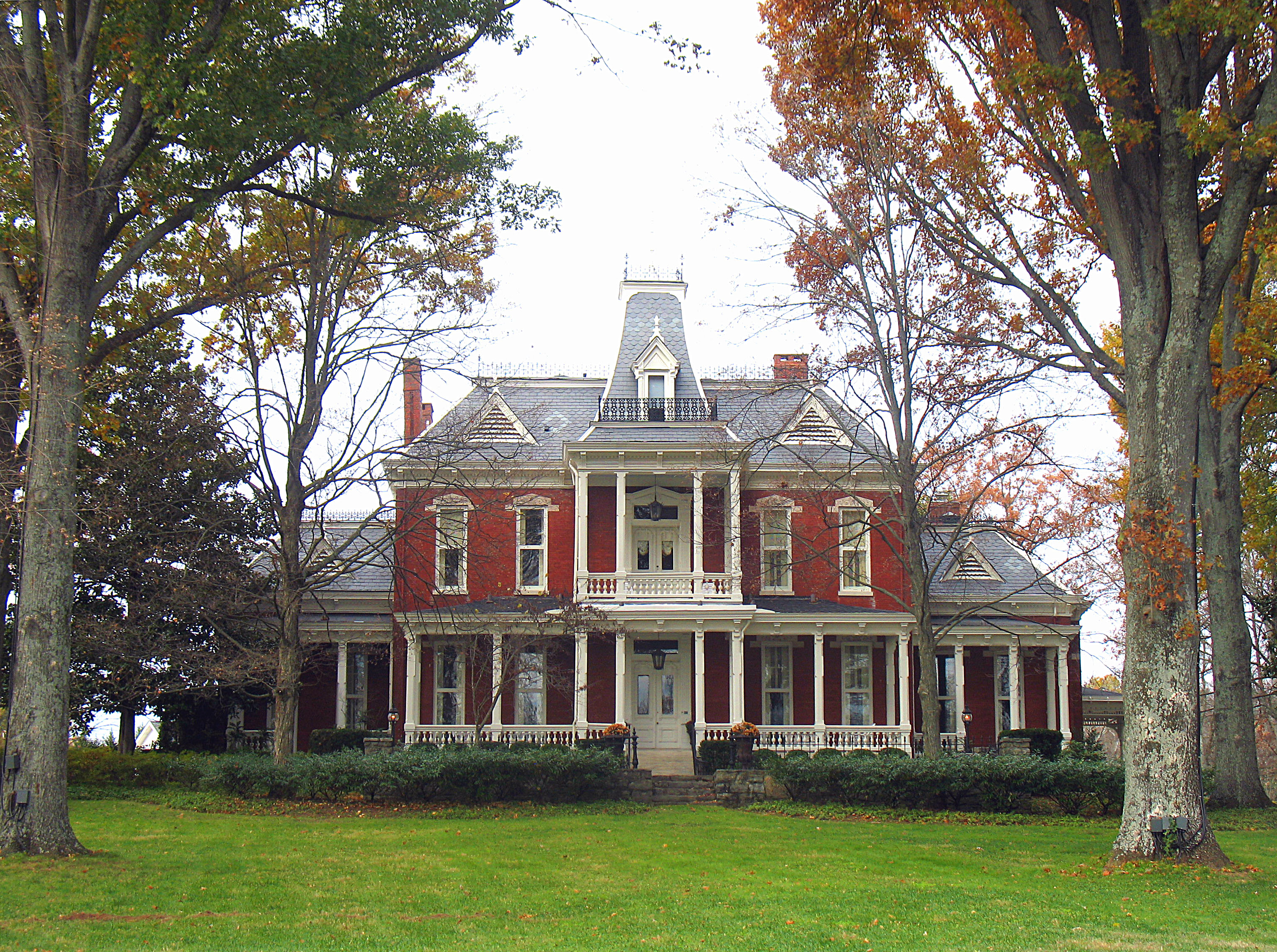

- Location within Tennessee Location within the United States
- Location: Old Harding Pike, Nashville, Tennessee, U.S.
- Coordinates: 36°5′51.4″N 86°52′38.6″W
- Area: 8 acres (3.2 ha)
- Built: 1886
- Architectural style: Victorian
- NRHP reference No.: 75001750
- Added to NRHP: March 4, 1975

West Meade is a historic mansion in Nashville, Tennessee, United States.

== Location ==
The mansion is located on Old Harding Pike in Nashville, Tennessee. The road was named for the Harding family that owned Belle Meade Plantation until 1906. It had thousands of acres that have since been developed as parts of the city and Belle Meade, Tennessee.

== History ==
The mansion was built in 1886 for Howell Edmunds Jackson (1832–1895) and his wife Mary Elizabeth (née Harding), second daughter and last child of William Giles Harding (1808–1886), owner of the Belle Meade Plantation. Harding had given them a tract of 2600 acres in the western section of his 5400-acre plantation. They had the mansion built and called the property "West Meade". The red brick mansion has a French Victorian-style porch.

After Belle Meade Plantation was sold in 1906, this area was developed as a residential neighborhood called West Meade after the mansion. The house is listed on the National Register of Historic Places. To this day, the house is privately owned.

== Architectural significance ==
The three-story house is made of red, hand-polished brick. There are 20 rooms on the first two floors; the third contains a ballroom and includes a widow's walk. It was listed on the National Register of Historic Places on March 4, 1975, as an example of the elaborate Victorian mansions built in Nashville in the late 1800s.
