= Belle Meade Gun Club =

American sport-shooting organization

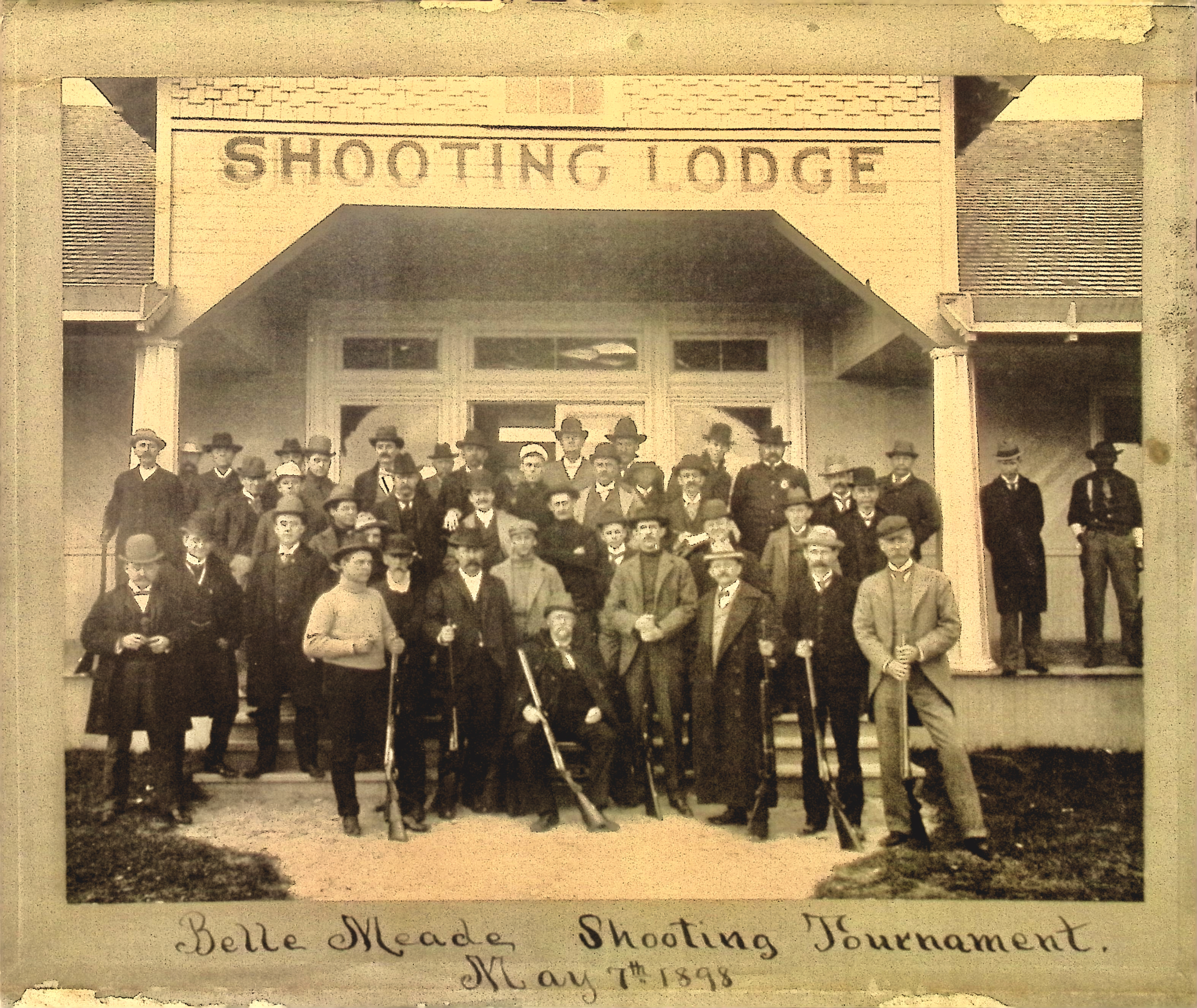
Belle Meade Gun Club, May 7, 1898

The Belle Meade Gun Club was a sport-shooting organization founded in 1897 on the grounds of Belle Meade Plantation on the west side of Nashville, Tennessee. The land, a small parcel of the farm's vast acreage, was donated by its owner, former Confederate General William Hicks Jackson, who enjoyed the sport of shotgun live-bird wing shooting. Jackson created a shooting club with the purpose of hosting competitions and increasing its members' skill in trap shooting. The targets included live pigeons as well as artificial targets. The members were primarily young society men, but there were also lady members.

The club became popular quickly, and soon hosted the state championship (The Tennessee Wing-shot Championship) and the 1898 U.S. National Wing Shot Championship. In 1899, it featured celebrity sharpshooter Annie Oakley in a competition. The Belle Meade estate fell on hard times near the turn of the 19th century and became insolvent, leading to a dispersal sale of its assets in 1906. Today there is no remaining physical trace of the gun club; a private country club now occupies the site.

== Club founding ==
In 1897, General Jackson was a man of wealth and influence in Nashville who had developed the Belle Meade Stud farm, achieving a national reputation for breeding thoroughbred horses. His avocation was the sport of live bird wing shooting, and this club offered him means to pursue it. The land for the club was part of the 5,400 acres (8.4 sq mi) Belle Meade Plantation, which he controlled; he donated a small parcel of it in 1897 for shooting. For a lodge, he found a structure that had been used in Nashville's Tennessee Centennial Exposition, one of nearly 100 buildings built for the six-month Expo that were never intended to be permanent. When the Expo concluded in October,1897, Jackson purchased one of these buildings and had it moved to the gun club site. The house was finished in hardwood and furnished in wicker. The club's officers included Jackson himself as president and W.R.Elliston as secretary-treasurer. Other prominent members were C.B.Cullom, W.H. Jackson Jr., Alex Hunter, W.T. Peyton, Dr. William White, Edgar Foster, and Joe Warner. The members were primarily young society men, but there were also lady members. Lady members included Mrs. William Elliston, Misses Anne Dallas, Louise McClure, and Mildred Williams.

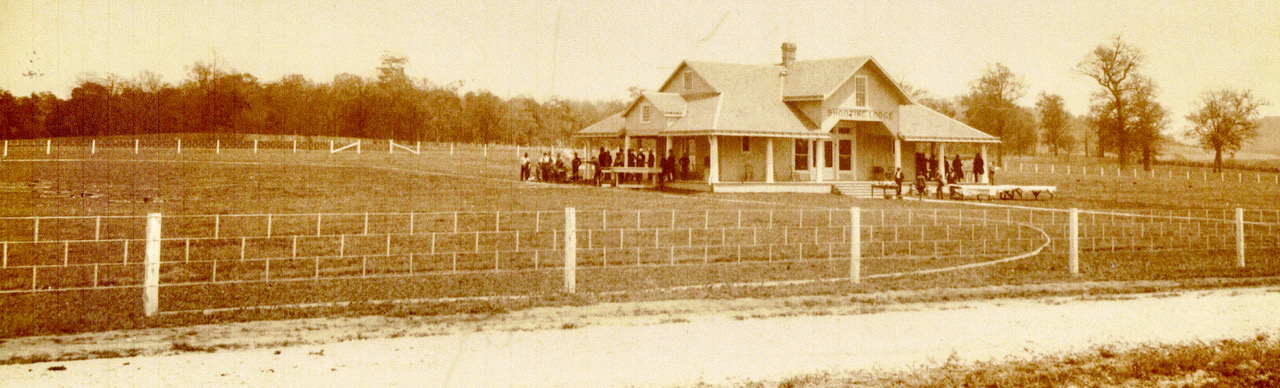
Belle Meade Gun Club Lodge, Nashville, ca 1898

Trap shooting, using live pigeons on the wing as targets, was introduced into the U.S. about 1825. Live birds were used at the Belle Meade Gun Club for certain matches. The pigeons were counted and placed in boxes down-range. The shooter, at a distance of 30 yards, gave a command and the box opened; a spring loaded device catapulted the birds upward where they took flight. Live pigeons were expensive, and members sought artificial targets for trap competitions when possible. Alternate targets included glass balls containing feathers, and clay targets. For decades, animal rights activists attempted to ban live pigeon shoots. As of 2017, pigeon shooting in this manner was unlawful in 14 U.S. states.

== Competitions ==
Beginning on February 17, 1897, the gun club members started meeting on Saturday afternoons to shoot targets of both clay pigeons and live birds. With Jackson's influence, the club gained popularity rapidly, to the extent of hosting the Tennessee Wing-shot Championship on May 11, 1899, won by J.D.B. DeBow from Memphis who hit 24 of 25 pigeons in flight. The shooters were handicapped by yardages from which they shot, typically 30 yards, but the less skilled (higher handicappers) shot one or two yards closer to the target.

In October, 1898, the club hosted a four-day shooting tournament featuring elite U.S.marksmen. The Nashville American reported the following facts:

- "All of the most famous trap shooters in the country will be here to participate."
- "A watchman and 3 bulldogs will be at the club-house at night, and guns, etc., can be left there in perfect safety."
- "The Southern Turf Company offers a handsome silver loving cup to the winner of this event."
- "Every day during the shoot lunch and barbecue will be served on the grounds free of charge."
- "On the final day the National Championship will be decided."

The final day, a match with 100 live birds for each side produced the "Wing Shot Champion of the United States", with a cast-iron medal attesting the winner, Charles W. Budd, of Des Moines, Iowa. The contest for national champion was also referred to as the "American Field Cup". From 1899, annual trapshooting championships have been hosted in various locations around the United States and led to the formation of the American Trapshooting Association(ATA) in 1900. Its name was changed in 1923 to the Amateur Trapshooting Association . Composer John Philip Sousa was a trapshooting enthusiast and served as president of the ATA; he was inducted into the Trapshooting Hall of Fame.

Celebrity exhibition marksman, Annie Oakley, age 39, visited the Belle Meade Gun Club on October 26, 1899, as a special guest in a shooting competition. She competed in the "Court-House Handicap". Oakley was familiar with Nashville, having performed there as part of Buffalo Bill's Wild West Show.

== Demise ==
The Harding estate (Belle Meade Plantation), despite its national recognition, had increasing financial difficulties during the late 19th century. The Civil War resulted in the estate's occupation by Union troops and imprisonment of the owner. The estate was pillaged by the soldiers, but recovered after the war with reduced means. It received another blow in the financial "Panic of 1893" in which hundreds of banks closed, numerous U.S. farms ceased operation. These and other factors eventually resulted in bankruptcy of the farm leading to a dispersal sale of its assets between 1903 and 1906. Gen. William Hicks Jackson died in 1903 at age 67 and his son, William Harding Jackson (1874–1903), died of typhoid fever just 3 months later at age 49, leaving a two year old son.

A land-developing syndicate purchased a large portion of the estate to create a residential community called "Belle Meade." The Nashville Golf and Country club was attracted to move out to Belle Meade, four miles west of its existing downtown location. Land developers created incentives for the move because a golf course would enhance the desirability for the lots. The country club later built a clubhouse on the former site of the gun club. In 1938, most of the estate's former acreage was incorporated into the independent city of Belle Meade, Tennessee. Today, there is no physical trace of the Belle Meade Gun Club.
