= West Meade, Nashville, Tennessee =

West Meade
- Neighborhood
- Location within Tennessee Location within the United States
- Coordinates: 36°07′04″N 86°53′14″W
- Country: United States
- State: Tennessee
- County: Davidson
- City: Nashville
- Elevation: 499 ft (152 m)
- Time zone: UTC-6 (Central (CST))
  - Summer (DST): UTC-5 (CDT)
- ZIP Code: 37205
- Area codes: 615, 629
- GNIS feature ID: 1274212

West Meade is a neighborhood in Nashville, Tennessee. It is governed by the Metropolitan Council of Nashville and Davidson County, due to the fact that the government of Davidson County is consolidated with that of Nashville

== Location ==
The West Meade neighborhood is "… that sector of Nashville, Davidson County, Tennessee denoted by the Metropolitan Nashville Davidson County Government neighborhood map as “West Meade," including "West Meade Park." The northern boundary begins at Charlotte Avenue at Davidson Drive, including Brook Meade School and continues to the portion of Davidson Road east of the intersection of the two, then to Harding Pike. The eastern boundary consists of Harding Pike at Davidson Road through the fork of Harding Pike and Highway 100. The southern boundary is Harding Pike from the fork of Harding Pike and Highway 100 to Carnavon Parkway. The western boundary includes all property including the ridges behind and all streets leading to and including Carnavon Parkway, Rolling Fork Drive and Rodney Drive, with the northern point at Charlotte Avenue at Davidson Drive."

== History ==
The West Meade neighborhood includes land which was once part of the Belle Meade Plantation. West Meade, named because it was the Western portion of Belle Meade Plantation, was the home of Justice Howell Edmunds Jackson and his wife, Mary Elizabeth (née Harding). It was not until 1944 that Mary and Howell Jackson's children sold West Meade to a group of investors headed by E. A. Wortham and Brownlee O. Currey. Those Nashville businessmen had incorporated a company under the name West Meade Farms, Inc., to take title to the property they acquired. At the time of the sale, the purchasers announced plans for the development of part of the 1,700 acre tract, with the remainder to be cut up into small farms. The small farms have long since disappeared in favor of the post World War II homes comprising today's West Meade.

Typical of its era, West Meade is a suburban, automobile-oriented neighborhood. It originally consisted primarily of masonry veneer "ranch" style detached houses on large lots. "Some of the ranch homes original to the neighborhood are still not renovated and can be scooped up for around $250,000. However, the growing trend in the area is for investors to buy the ranch homes, demolish them and construct what [Susan] Niles called "McMansions" on the large lots. Currently (2014) homes are on the market in West Meade with square footage ranging from about 1,300 square feet to 9,000 square feet and price tags from $249,000 to $2,695,000."

The West Meade Community is made up of a group of neighborhoods that were formed from the original farm. Examples are West Meade Farms, West Meade Hills, West Meade Park.

"Best known for its true connection to nature, West Meade residents enjoy wildlife in their yards, as well as at neighboring Percy and Edwin Warner Parks. Residents have managed to keep West Meade Waterfall a relative secret, and it's only one of the many special places to explore in the area."

== Education ==
Westmeade Elementary School and Abintra Montessori School are located in West Meade. Other schools nearby include Hillwood High School, H. G. Hill Middle School, Akiva School and Saint Henry School
