= Tennessee Performing Arts Center =

Arts center in Nashville, Tennessee, US

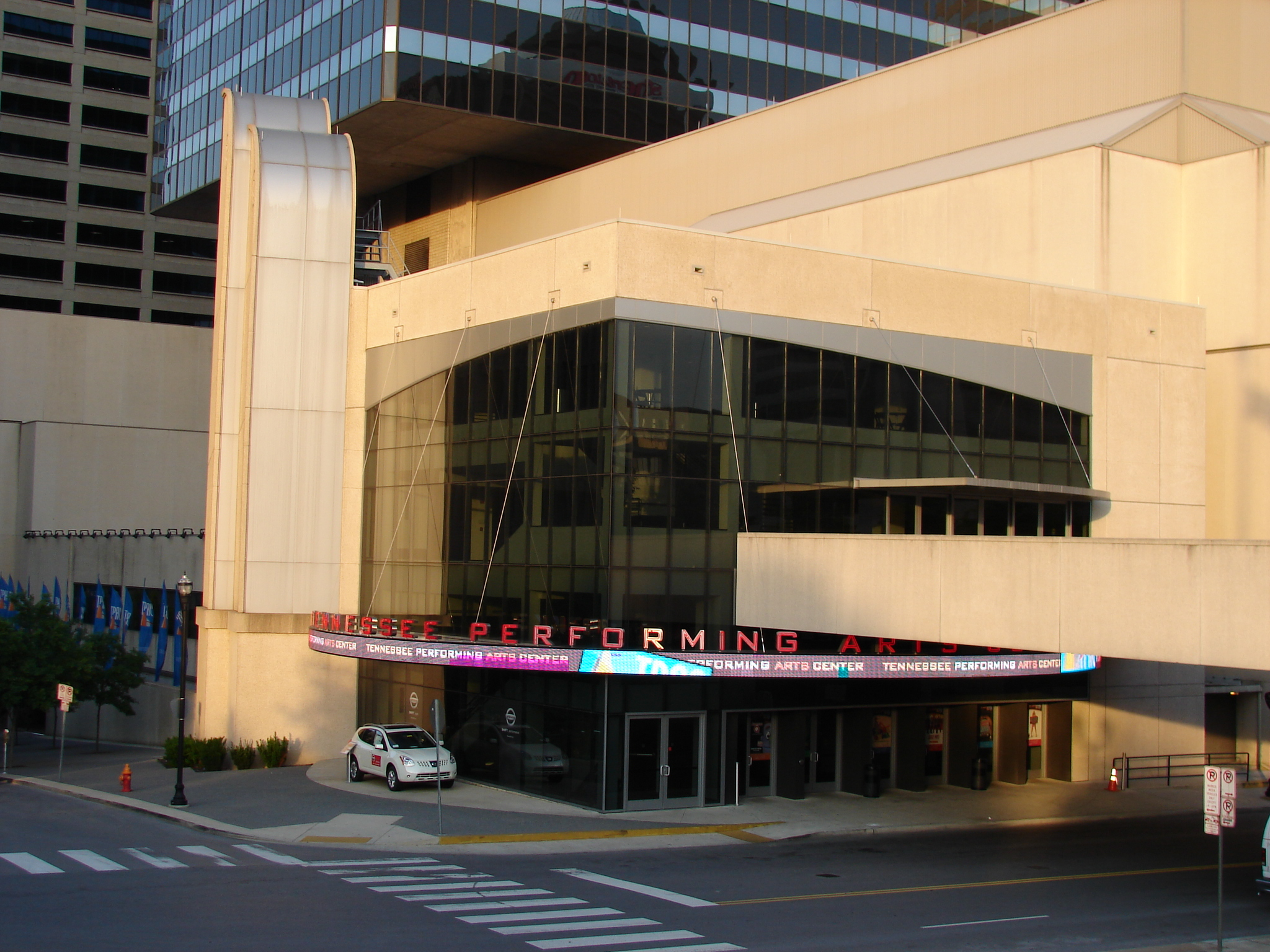
- Interactive map of Tennessee Performing Arts Center
- Address: 505 Deaderick Street; Nashville, Tennessee; United States
- Coordinates: 36.1649°N 86.7817°W
- Owner: Tennessee Performing Arts Center Management Corporation
- Capacity: Andrew Jackson Hall: 2,472; James K. Polk Theater: 1,075; Andrew Johnson Theater: 256
- Type: Performing arts center

Construction
- Opened: 1980

Tenants
- Nashville Ballet; Nashville Opera; Nashville Repertory Theatre; Broadway Across America

Website
- www.tpac.org

″

The Tennessee Performing Arts Center (TPAC) is located in the James K. Polk Cultural Center at 505 Deaderick Street in downtown Nashville, Tennessee. It occupies a city block between 5th and 6th Avenues North and Deaderick and Union Streets. The cultural center adjoins the 18-story James K. Polk State Office Building.

== History ==
In the early 1800s, the site was where the fourth mayor of Nashville, Joseph T. Elliston, lived with his wife Louisa and their son William R. Elliston until they moved to Burlington, their plantation in mid-town Nashville.

The idea for a large-scale performing arts facility developed in 1972, when Martha Rivers Ingram was appointed to the advisory board of the Kennedy Center for the Performing Arts in Washington, D.C., and proposed a similar center for her home city of Nashville. Ingram's proposal involved a public-private partnership that would operate within a state-owned facility. Her idea was met with considerable resistance, but she persevered for eight years and throughout the terms of three governors. The result is the Tennessee Performing Arts Center, a three-theater facility located beneath a state office building across the street from the Tennessee State Capitol. In 1980, TPAC opened as the state's premier theater venue.

Among its operations, TPAC presents a series of touring Broadway shows and special engagements, and administers a comprehensive education program.

Martha Rivers Ingram and her supporters also raised an endowment to defray operating losses and to fund a program that grooms future audiences for TPAC performances. The endowment goal was $3.5 million, and they surpassed it, raising $5 million. Today, the endowment has grown to $20 million. Each year, more than 100,000 students, from kindergarten through 12th grade, are brought to Nashville for performances by the Nashville Ballet, the Nashville Opera, and the Nashville Repertory Theatre, which are all resident performing arts groups of TPAC and provide year-round programming. Other companies also use TPAC's facilities for plays, dance performances, concerts, and other cultural programs.

The Tennessee Performing Arts Center Management Corporation is governed by a 27-member Board of Directors. Directors serve for a term of three years.

== Performance venues ==
The performance venues are named for the three Presidents of the United States who hailed from Tennessee:

=== Andrew Jackson Hall ===
Andrew Jackson Hall is the largest of TPAC's multi-purpose theaters with a seating capacity of 2,472 seats, including 47 pit seats. The stage is more than 130 feet wide by 53 feet deep. The stage has a proscenium opening of more than 57 feet by 36 feet.

=== James K. Polk Theater ===
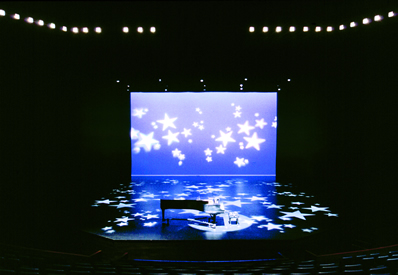
TPAC's Polk Theater

James K. Polk Theater has a seating capacity of 1,075 seats, including 44 pit seats. The stage is more than 87 feet by 50 feet, with a proscenium opening of nearly 47 feet by 30 feet.

=== Andrew Johnson Theater ===
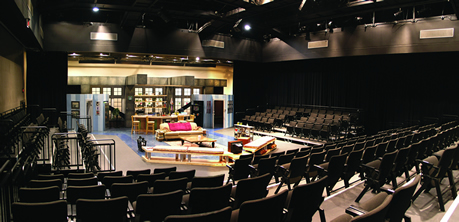
TPAC's Johnson Theater

Andrew Johnson Theater is TPAC's smallest theater. The 59' x 54' center open floor performing space is surrounded by three sides with banks of theater seating. With seating up to 256 configurable seats.

=== War Memorial Auditorium ===
TPAC also governs the War Memorial Auditorium (1,661 seats), a historic building that anchors the War Memorial Plaza, adjacent to Nashville's capitol building and across 6th Avenue from the Tennessee Performing Arts Center.
