= William Hicks Jackson =

Confederate Army general (1835–1903)

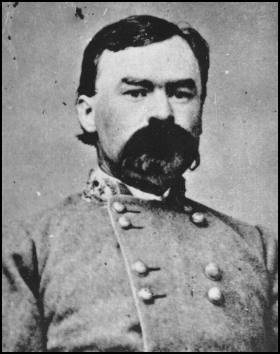
- Born: October 1, 1835; Paris, Tennessee, U.S.
- Died: March 30, 1903 (aged 67); Belle Meade, Tennessee, U.S.
- Alma mater: West Tennessee College; United States Military Academy
- Relatives: Howell Edmunds Jackson (brother)
- Military career
- Allegiance: United States of America; Confederate States of America
- Branch: United States Army; Confederate States Army
- Service years: 1856–1861; 1861–1865
- Rank: Second Lieutenant (USA); Brigadier General (CSA)
- Commands: 1st Tennessee Cavalry Regiment; W.H. Jackson's Cavalry Brigade; W.H. Jackson's Cavalry Division
- Conflicts: Indian Wars; American Civil War
- Other work: Planter

William Hicks "Red" Jackson (October 1, 1835 – March 30, 1903) was a career United States Army officer who graduated from West Point. After serving briefly in the Southwest and resigning when the American Civil War broke out, he served in the Confederate Army, gaining the rank of brigadier general by the end of the war.

Afterward he became a major planter and horse breeder in Middle Tennessee. As a widower he married Selene Harding, daughter of the owner of the 5300-acre Belle Meade Plantation near Nashville. Jackson co-managed the operations with his father-in-law William Giles Harding. They expanded the raising of purebred horses, cattle, sheep, and goats.

Jackson and his wife inherited an interest in the plantation, and Belle Meade was known for the quality of horses he bred. He shared some decisions with his brother Howell Edmunds Jackson, who as a widower had married Selene's sister Mary Harding in 1873; they also inherited an interest in Belle Meade.

== Early life and career ==
Jackson was born in Paris, Tennessee, a son of Dr. Alexander Jackson and Mary (Hurt) Jackson, the daughter of a Baptist minister; both his parents were natives of Virginia whose families had migrated to Middle Tennessee. When he was five, his family moved to Jackson, Tennessee. His older brother Howell Edmunds Jackson became an attorney, politician and later served as a US senator and, late in life, as a United States Supreme Court Justice. Their father was elected as a Whig to the state legislature and subsequently as Jackson's mayor.

He attended West Tennessee College (now Union University) before accepting an appointment to the United States Military Academy. Jackson graduated from West Point in 1856 and was brevetted as a second lieutenant in the U.S. Army.

Jackson studied at the cavalry school at Carlisle Barracks before being assigned to the Regiment of Mounted Rifles. He served on frontier duty at Fort Bliss in Texas in 1857, and engaged in a skirmish with Kiowa near Fort Craig in New Mexico Territory. He participated in the Comanche and Kiowa Expedition of 1860.

== Civil War ==
When word came of Tennessee's secession, Jackson resigned from the Army on May 16, 1861, and returned to the South to enroll in the Confederate army. He was commissioned as a captain of artillery. He served as an aide-de-camp to General Gideon Pillow and at the Battle of Belmont in November. In early 1862, Jackson was appointed as colonel of the 1st Tennessee Cavalry and rose to be chief of cavalry, serving under John C. Pemberton, Earl Van Dorn, and lastly Sterling Price. On December 29, 1862, he was promoted to brigadier general.

He served with distinction in the Vicksburg Campaign in early 1863. In February 1864, he commanded the cavalry of Leonidas Polk in the campaign around Meridian, Mississippi. During the Atlanta campaign that summer, Jackson commanded the cavalry division of the Army of Mississippi. His troopers repeatedly skirmished in August with the Union cavalry of H. Judson Kilpatrick, which was attempting to destroy railroads south of the city. Jackson won a significant victory at the Battle of Brown's Mill near Newnan, Georgia.

He continued to lead his division through the Nashville and Murfreesboro campaign before retreating to Mississippi. In February 1865, he was assigned command of all cavalry from Tennessee in the force of Nathan Bedford Forrest. He successfully isolated the Union brigade of John T. Croxton during Wilson's Raid in April.

== Postbellum career ==
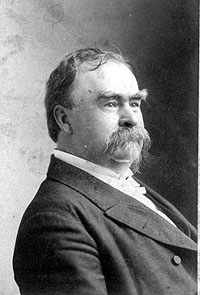
William Hicks Jackson

Following the war, Jackson returned to Tennessee and managed his father's cotton plantation. In 1868, he married Selene Harding. They had five children: William Harding Jackson (1874–1903), Eunice, Elizabeth, Selene (1876–1913) and infant son (b/d 1872) Jackson. With his father-in-law William Giles Harding, the senior Jackson learned to co-manage the latter's Belle Meade Stud near Nashville.

In the 1870s, Jackson became heavily involved in The Grange movement. He also belonged to the Tennessee Agricultural and Mechanical Association, and sat on the Tennessee Bureau of Agriculture.

His older brother, jurist Howell Edmunds Jackson, married Selene's younger sister Mary Harding after the death of his first wife in 1873, likely in the widespread cholera epidemic. In 1886 Jackson and his brother Howell took over control of Belle Meade following the death of their father-in-law William G. Harding. Jackson and his brother expanded the breeding operations and raised prize race horses. General Jackson purchased a stallion named Iroquois in 1886; the horse had been the first American winner of the British Epsom Derby in 1881.

Jackson continued Harding's practice of holding yearling sales at Belle Meade, but in 1892 he expanded his sales to New York, taking his yearlings there. That year was the most successful, and he sold 53 yearlings for $110,050. But the financial Panic of 1893 and the ensuing economic depression adversely affected his operations. In addition his horse breeding business suffered because of reform efforts by the evangelical movement in Tennessee, which resulted in closing down racetracks and ending associated gambling.

"By many accounts, "Billy" Jackson was gregarious, entertaining, and liked to "live Large", said historian Lynne Bachleda. The Jacksons were generous hosts, and many notable guests visited the plantation during the late 19th and early 20th century. They included President Grover Cleveland and his wife Frances, Robert Todd Lincoln, President Ulysses S. Grant, General William T. Sherman, General Winfield Scott Hancock, and Adlai E. Stevenson, who served as vice-president of the US from 1893 to 1897. The guests enjoyed country pursuits in the fenced deer park, barbecues, and tours of the thoroughbred paddocks. Jackson was fond of the sport of live bird wing shooting, and he founded the Belle Meade Gun Club on his farm in 1897. It hosted the Wing Shot Championship of the United States in 1898.

William Hicks Jackson died at Belle Meade in 1903 and was buried in the family's mausoleum in the plantation's cemetery. His son William Harding Jackson died that same year, survived by his wife Annie and a son of the same name. The youngest Jackson later served as an intelligence officer in World War II, and was part of the establishment of the CIA, serving as its deputy director.

In 1906, after the plantation was sold, Jackson's remains and those of other members of the Harding-Jackson family were reinterred in Mount Olivet Cemetery in Nashville, Tennessee.

== See also ==
- List of American Civil War generals (Confederate)
