= Joseph Thorpe Elliston =

American silversmith

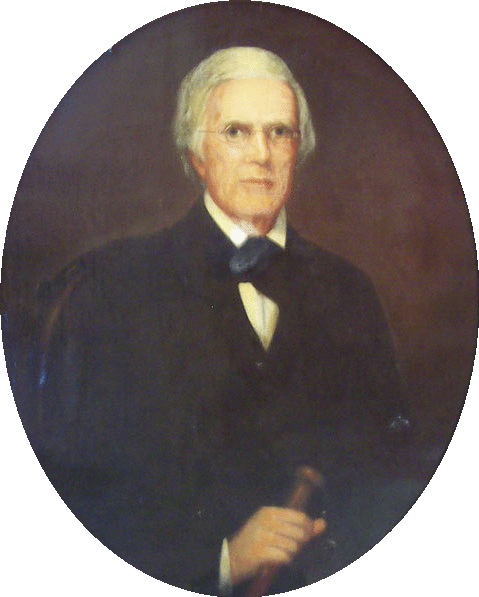
- Portrait of Elliston by Washington Bogart Cooper, circa 1840
- Born: 1779; Culpeper, Virginia, U.S.
- Died: November 10, 1856 (aged 76–77); Nashville, Tennessee, U.S.
- Resting place: Mount Olivet Cemetery
- Occupations: Silversmith, planter, politician
- Spouses: Louisa Mullen Elliston; Elizabeth Odom Blackman
- Children: 2 sons (including William R. Elliston), 3 daughters
- Relatives: Alexander Little Page Green (son-in-law)

Joseph Thorpe Elliston (1779 – November 10, 1856) was an American silversmith, planter and politician. He served as the fourth mayor of Nashville, Tennessee, from 1814 to 1817. He owned land in mid-town Nashville, on parts of modern-day Centennial Park, Vanderbilt University, and adjacent West End Park.

== Early life ==
Elliston was born in 1779 in Culpeper, Virginia. He moved to Lexington, Kentucky, where he was trained as a silversmith by Samuel Ayers from 1795 to 1798, when he moved to Nashville, Tennessee.

== Career ==
Elliston began his career as a silversmith in Nashville in 1798. He was the owner of a store on the corner of Union Street and 2nd Avenue in modern-day Downtown Nashville, which he ran with his nephew, also called John Elliston. The store burnt down in March 1814, but he opened a new one shortly after. He designed cutlery for President Andrew Jackson, which later became part of the collection of The Hermitage. He also designed jewelry with silver and gold.

In 1811, Elliston purchased 208 acres for $11,435.75 in mid-town, from "what is now 20th Avenue to a line covering part of Centennial Park, and from a line well within the Vanderbilt campus today to Charlotte Avenue." He subsequently purchased 350 acres "along what is now Murphey Road, including the Acklen Park [West End Park] area." It ran across West End Avenue, which had not yet been built. Elliston built a small house, and he named it Burlington "after the Elliston homestead in Kentucky." The house stood on modern-day Elliston Place.

Elliston as a city alderman from 1806 to 1814. He served as the fourth mayor of Nashville from 1814 to 1817. He also served on the committee for the construction of the Tennessee State Capitol, and he was a co-founder of the Nashville Female Academy and the McKendree Methodist Church.

== Personal life, death and legacy ==
Elliston married Louisa Mullen on August 20, 1800. They had two sons, William and Joseph, and three daughters, Jane, Harriet and Adeline. She predeceased him in 1816, and Elliston married Elizabeth Odom, widow of Charles Elliott and Rev. Learner Blackman. They resided on Sixth Avenue in Downtown Nashville, where the Tennessee Performing Arts Center was later built. His son-in-law, Alexander Little Page Green, was a Methodist minister.

Elliston died on November 10, 1856, in Nashville. His funeral was conducted by John Berry McFerrin at the McKendree United Methodist Church. He was first buried in the Nashville City Cemetery and later in the Mount Olivet Cemetery.

Elliston's son William R. Elliston married Elizabeth Boddie, a granddaughter of his stepmother, inherited the Burlington plantation, and served as a member of the Tennessee House of Representatives. Elliston's portrait, done by Washington Bogart Cooper, is in the Nashville Public Library.

Political offices
Preceded by William Tait	Mayor of Nashville, Tennessee; 1814–1817	Succeeded by Stephen Cantrell Jr.
