= William R. Elliston =

American politician

William Robert Elliston

Member of the Tennessee House of Representatives from Davidson County
- In office 1845–1847
- Preceded by: John Trimble; Charles W. Moorman
- Succeeded by: John Bell

Personal details
- Born: 1815
- Died: 1870 (aged 54–55)
- Party: Whig
- Spouse: Elizabeth Boddie
- Children: Elijah Boddie Elliston, Lizinka (Elliston) Buford
- Parent(s): Joseph Thorpe Elliston; Louisa Mullen
- Occupation: Planter, politician

William R. Elliston (1815–1870) was an American planter, slaveholder and politician. He served as a member of the Tennessee House of Representatives from 1845 to 1847. He owned Burlington Plantation in what is now Nashville, Tennessee. An investor in railroads and real estate, Elliston entered his horses in equestrian competitions. The former plantation property was later developed as modern-day Centennial Park, Vanderbilt University and West End Park.

== Early life ==
Elliston was born in 1815. His father, Joseph Thorpe Elliston, was a silversmith and planter who served as the fourth mayor of Nashville from 1814 to 1817. The young Elliston grew up on Sixth Avenue in Downtown Nashville. In the twentieth century, the Tennessee Performing Arts Center was built on this site.

== Career ==
Elliston was a member of the Whig Party. He was elected and served one term as a member of the Tennessee House of Representatives from 1845 to 1847.

Elliston inherited Burlington Plantation from his father in 1856. The land included 208 acres in "what is now 20th Avenue to a line covering part of Centennial Park, and from a line well within the Vanderbilt campus today to Charlotte Avenue", as well as 350 acres "along what is now Murphey Road, including the Acklen Park [West End Park] area." It ran across what is today West End Avenue.

Elliston and his wife Elizabeth arranged to build a new mansion in 1859 to replace his father's plantation house. Elliston continued to depend on slave labor to operate the plantation.

During the American Civil War of 1861–1865, the Union Army used the west wing of the Burlington mansion as a base, after it had occupied Nashville. Elliston had hid "the valuables of Nashville merchants" in his basement. After the war, Elliston was among several businessmen who called for the construction of a chapel in Lexington, Virginia, in honor of Stonewall Jackson.

Elliston invested in the Louisville and Nashville Railroad, the Nashville and Chattanooga Railroad, and the Tennessee and Pacific Railroad. He was an investor in the Richland Turnpike Company in Nashville as well as municipal bonds for the city of Memphis, Tennessee. He was also a shareholder in the Union Bank, the Commercial Insurance Company, the Old Tennessee Marine and Fire Insurance Company, and the New Tennessee Marine and Fire Insurance Company.

Elliston was a horsebreeder, and he entered his stallions in equestrian competitions such as the ones held by the Tennessee Agricultural and Mechanical Association, on whose board he served until 1870. His avocation was sport shooting; he was an officer in Nashville's Belle Meade Gun Club, and participated in many pigeon-shooting competitions. At one time he represented a rifle company in tournaments across the U.S.

== Personal life and legacy ==
Elliston married Elizabeth Boddie. She was a granddaughter of his stepmother. They resided at the Burlington mansion, which they had built in 1859 to incorporate a house built by his father Joseph. Then within a 208-acre plantation, its former site is on what is today modern-day Elliston Place. Their children included a son Elijah Boddie Elliston and daughter Lizinska (see below).

Their son Elijah Boddie Elliston (1841–1879) married Leonora née Chapman (1846–1899). Among their children was William R. Elliston (1872–1909), named for his grandfather. He married Selene Harding Jackson, a daughter of General William Hicks Jackson. The younger Elliston was active in competing in trap shooting, with tournaments being held at private sporting clubs.

Their daughter Lizinska married Edward Buford, a Confederate veteran, in November 1875. They had five children, four of whom survived to adulthood, including Edward Buford III.

Elliston died in 1870. His and Harding-Jackson descendants lived in the mansion until 1932, when it was razed.
