= John Harding (Southern planter) =

American planter and thoroughbred breeder (1777–1867)

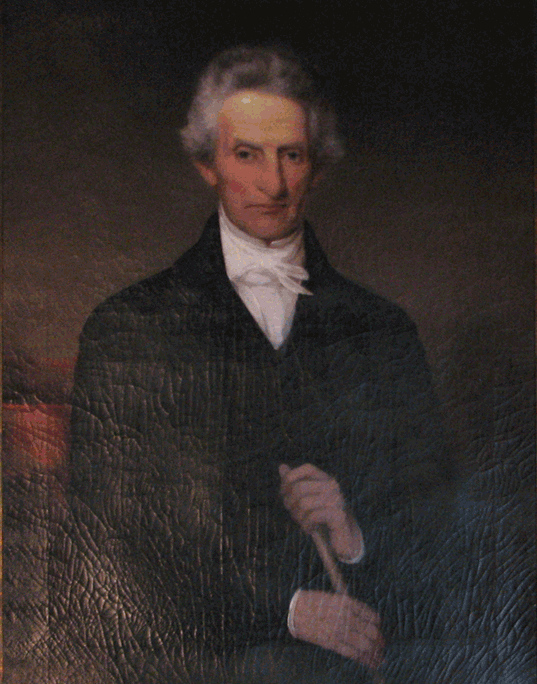
- Portrait of John Harding by Washington Bogart Cooper, 1846
- Born: November 2, 1777; Goochland County, Virginia
- Died: September 16, 1867; Nashville, Tennessee
- Occupations: Planter; Horsebreeder
- Spouse: Susannah Shute
- Children: William Giles Harding
- Parent(s): Giles Harding and his wife

John Harding (November 2, 1777 – September 16, 1867) was an American Southern planter and thoroughbred breeder in Middle Tennessee, near Nashville. He developed Belle Meade Plantation from 250 acres to 1300 in Davidson County; Bellevue at McSpadden's Bend on the Cumberland River, also in the county; and a 10,000-acre cotton plantation at Plum Point Bend in Mississippi County, Arkansas.

In 1850 Harding was the third-largest enslaver in Davidson County, given the total of enslaved Black Americans at his two Tennessee plantations. At Belle Meade he began to specialize in breeding and racing thoroughbred horses, and registered his silks with the Nashville Jockey Club.

His son William Giles Harding acquired additional lands to enlarge Belle Mead to 5400 acres by the late 19th century, and began to breed purebred cattle, sheep, cashmere goats and other livestock. Due to debt, in 1906 most of the property was sold to a land development company, and later suburban housing was built, and the independent city of Belle Meade, Tennessee was founded. Belle Meade Plantation, which was listed on the National Register of Historic Places in the late 20th century, now consists of the 1853 mansion, and outbuildings on 30 acres. It is operated as a museum and event space

== Early life ==
John Harding was born in Goochland County, Virginia on November 2, 1777. His family moved to Davidson County, Tennessee in 1798, in what was known as Middle Tennessee of the Grand Divisions. His grandfather had owned slaves in Virginia, and his father, Giles Harding, brought several with the family to Tennessee. John Harding also owned slaves and became the third-largest slaveholder in Davidson County by 1850.

== Career ==
In 1807, Harding purchased a 250-acre farm and log cabin from Daniel Dunham; it was called Dunham Station at Richland Creek on the Natchez Trace, six miles west of Nashville. By 1820, he expanded the farm to 3800 acres and constructed a brick Federal style home. He invested in thoroughbreds, and developed it as the Belle Meade Plantation, devoted to raising high-quality blooded livestock. In 1823, he registered his silks with the Nashville Jockey Club and was racing some of his thoroughbred horses. The plantation also included businesses: a blacksmith shop, grist mill, and saw mill.

Harding also owned four other plantations in the South: a sugar plantation in Louisiana, and cotton plantations in Mississippi County, Arkansas, Alabama, and in the Pennington bend between the Stones and Cumberland rivers in Nashville.

Harding invested in the Nashville Female Academy and sent his two daughters there. By 1839, he turned the Belle Meade Plantation operations over to his son William Giles Harding, as he was busy developing a 10,000-acre cotton plantation in Mississippi County, Arkansas in the lowland delta of the Mississippi River. After returning to Nashville, he moved with his wife into a townhouse at 85 Spring Street in Nashville.

== Personal life ==
Harding married Susannah Shute on August 6, 1806. They had six children. Three survived infancy: son William Giles Harding (1808–1886), and two daughters, Elizabeth and Amanda.

== Death ==
Harding died on September 16, 1867, in Nashville.
