= Burlington (Nashville, Tennessee) =

Coordinates: 36.1496°N 86.8070°W

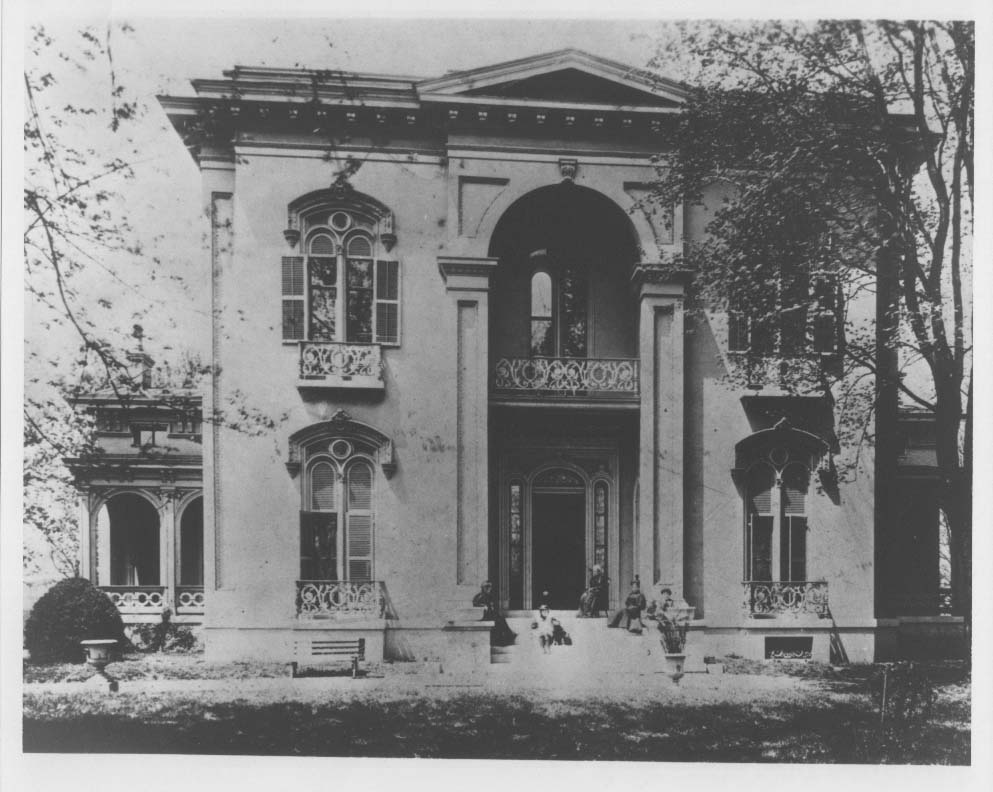
- Alternative names: Elliston-Farrell House

General information
- Architectural style: Renaissance architecture
- Location: Nashville, Tennessee, United States
- Completed: 1816; 1859
- Demolished: 1932
- Client: Joseph Thorpe Elliston; William R. Elliston

Design and construction
- Architect: William Strickland

Burlington, also known as the Elliston-Farrell House, was a historic mansion on a plantation in mid-town Nashville, Tennessee, US. It stood on modern-day Elliston Place.

== History ==
The plantation was established by Joseph T. Elliston, a silversmith who served as the fourth mayor of Nashville from 1814 to 1817. In 1811, Elliston purchased 208 acres for $11,435.75 (~$251,306 in 2024) in mid-town, from "what is now 20th Avenue to a line covering part of Centennial Park, and from a line well within the Vanderbilt campus today to Charlotte Avenue." He subsequently purchased 350 acres "along what is now Murphy Road, including the Acklen Park [West End Park] area." It ran across West End Avenue, which had not yet been built.

Elliston built a small house in 1816 and named it Burlington "after the Elliston homestead in Kentucky." The house stood on modern-day Elliston Place. It was designed by William Strickland in the Renaissance architectural style.

His son William R. Elliston, who served as a member of the Tennessee House of Representatives from 1845 to 1847, inherited the plantation in 1856. He built a bigger house on his father's old house in 1859 with his wife Elizabeth Boddie. The Ellistons were enslavers.

Their daughter, Lizinka, inherited the plantation. With her husband, Edward Buford, a Confederate veteran, she built a new house in 1887. By 1889 they had sold most of the land to the West End Land Company for development. Part of the land was also donated to build the campus of Vanderbilt University.

The house was dismantled in 1932. However, the materials were used by the Shepherds, who were descendants of the Ellistons, to build a new mansion called Burlington in Green Hills, designed by architect Bryant Fleming.

In 2012, Vanderbilt University named Elliston Hall for Elizabeth Boddie Elliston. In a 2017 article, USA Today questioned their decision to honor an enslaver on their campus.
