= Richland Creek (Nashville, Tennessee) =

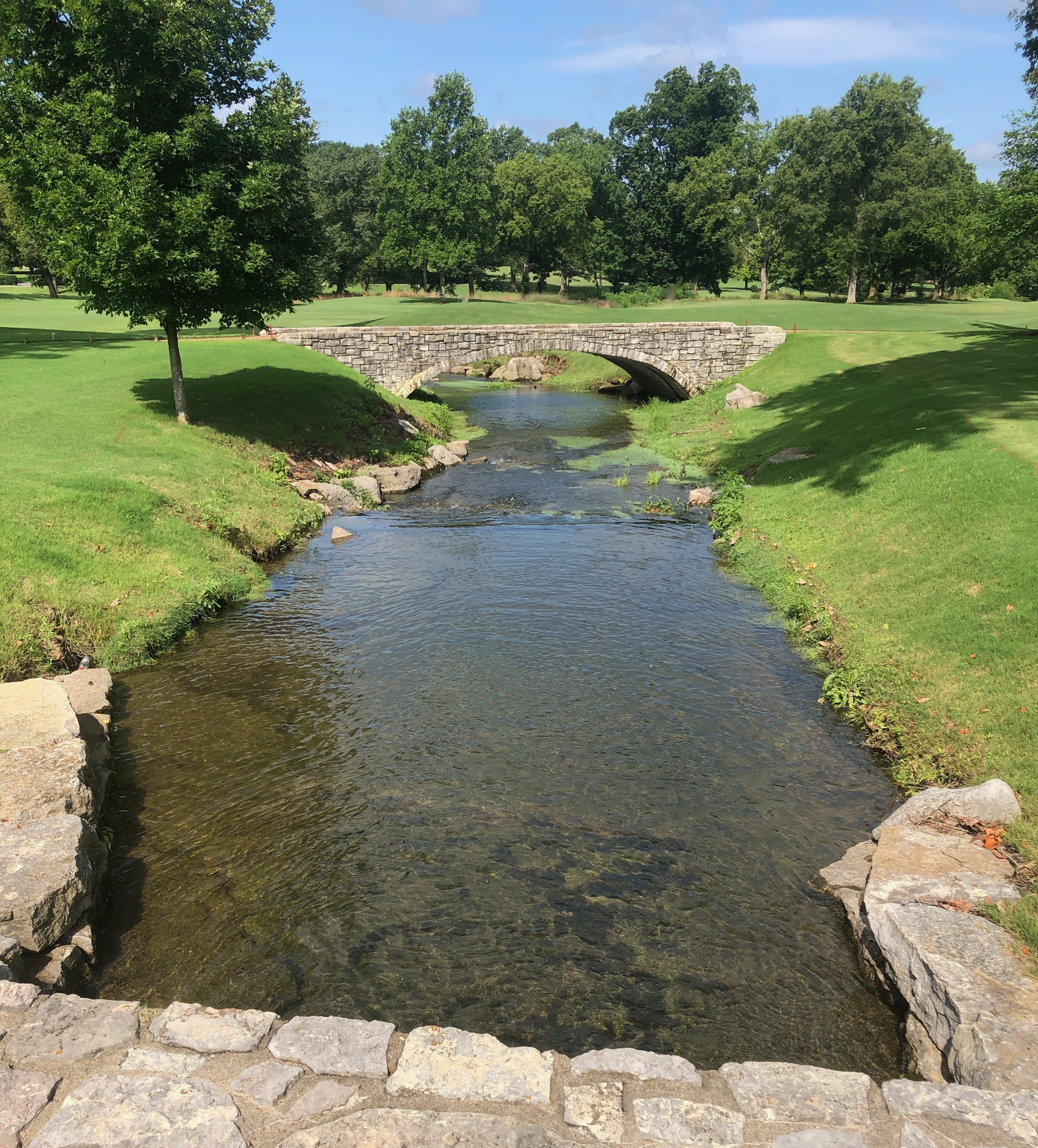
- Richland Creek near Belle Meade Boulevard, Nashville, 2020

Location
- Country: Davidson County, Tennessee, United States

Physical characteristics
- Mouth
  - location: Cumberland River
  - coordinates: 36°09′51″N 86°53′17″W
  - elevation: 385 feet (117 m)
- Length: 28 mi (45 km)
- Basin size: 17,712 acres (27.675 mi^{2})

Richland Creek is a stream on the west side of Nashville, Tennessee, formed by nine tributaries, all within the Nashville metropolitan area, flowing north to the Cumberland River. Draining some 28 square miles (73 km^{2}) via 24 miles (39 km) of streams, its watershed includes the suburban cities of Belle Meade and Forest Hills. It is among the most urbanized in the Cumberland River basin.

Once heavily polluted by industrial and municipal discharges, Richland has seen major restoration since 2009 but remains on the state’s list of impaired waterbodies. Severe flooding in 2010 caused fatalities along its course and inundated a nearby quarry. The Richland Creek Watershed Alliance, founded in 2007, advocates for its protection.

== Course and watershed ==
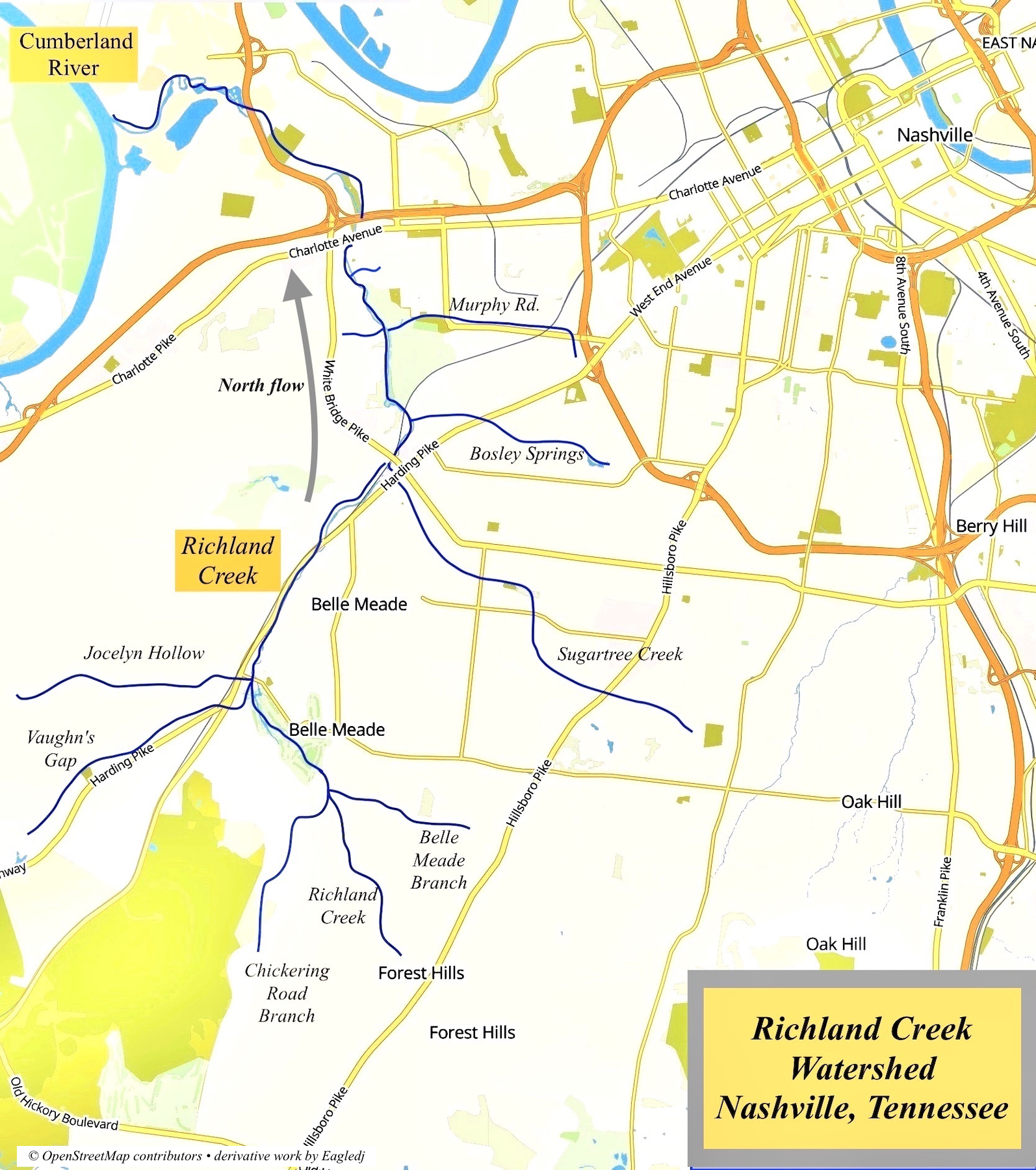
Map of the Richland Creek watershed in Nashville, Tennessee, showing tributaries, major roads, and nearby municipalities

The area of The Richland Creek Watershed is roughly 28 square miles (73 km^{2}), all within the Nashville metropolitan area. The drainage area includes nine tributaries, not all of which are named. Its elevations range from about 385 feet (117 m) at the creek's mouth to roughly 650 feet (200 m) in the upper reaches. The watershed contains approximately 24 miles (39 km) of streams.

The principal tributaries forming the Richland Creek mainstem are:

- Jocelyn Hollow Branch (roughly follows Jocelyn Hollow Road)
- Vaughn's Gap Branch (follows Harding Pike)
- Chickering Branch (along Chickering Road)
- Belle Meade Branch (follows Harding Place)
- Sugartree Creek (follows Woodmont Boulevard)
- Bosley Springs Branch (near St. Thomas Hospital)
- Murphy Road Branch (along Murphy Road)
- and two smaller unnamed tributaries

Four of these branches arise in uplands in southern Davidson County and flow north through the suburban cities of Forest Hills and Belle Meade before converging to form the main channel. From this confluence, Richland Creek passes by Belle Meade Plantation along Highway 70S (Harding Pike). Near the intersection with White Bridge Road it merges with Sugartree Creek, which generally follows the course of Woodmont Boulevard. From there, Richland Creek turns northwest along White Bridge Road before joining the Cumberland River near the end of Robertson Avenue at 36.1642237°N 86.8883339°W. (Note: Click on these coordinates to see a map showing the mouth of Richland Creek at the Cumberland River. Zoom the map for more detail.)

Development along the creek is primarily residential with some commercial areas at Belle Meade Plaza and along White Bridge Road. Richland flows by McCabe Golf Course, a Metro public course built in 1942. McCabe is a major source of water withdrawal from the creek with a daily average of about 400,000 gallons over a 60–155 day period. The creek's final mile runs through an industrial corridor that, in 2016, included a rock quarry, a concrete mixing plant, and several large petroleum bulk storage terminals.

== Stream characteristics and geology ==
Limestone bedrock typically makes up in streambeds throughout Richland Creek. In urbanized sections, structures have been built close to the watercourse, and some property owners have lined the banks with riprap to prevent erosion. Hydrologic studies note that this so-called "bank-hardening" can inhibit organic input from the riparian zone and reduce shade, woody debris, and finer organic material that support aquatic ecosystems. In less developed areas, the banks are typically bordered with grass, brush, or small trees. The floodplain of Richland Creek averages 600 to 800 feet in width, while those of its tributaries may reach from 150 feet (46 m) to 275 feet (84 m).

The bedrock of Richland Creek is characteristic of what is known as the "Nashville Group", a geologic formation described in 1851 that underlies much of middle Tennessee. It dates to the Ordovician Period—roughly 450 million years ago—and is a major component of the Central Basin’s limestone bedrock. In this stratum is a clouded blue limestone extensively used for building.

== Pollution and restoration ==
=== Early industrial era (1930s–1950s) ===
In 1936, millions of dead fish appeared in the Cumberland River near the mouth of Richland Creek. This was believed to be from the discharging of toxic dyestuffs by factories nearby. In 1946, the city of Nashville commissioned an engineering report which found inadequate sewage disposal and recommended a treatment plant and a new system of interceptor sewers. Interceptor sewers were the first steps in modern sanitation reform in the late 19th century. The sewer system in Nashville dates back to the late 1800s and originally consisted of sewage and stormwater combined. In 1946 The Tennessean stated, "the lower reaches of Richland Creek can be considered only as a open sewer". By 1950 Davidson County’s population increased, and the discharge of untreated waste and failure of septic systems represented a significant threat.

=== Metro sewer era (1960–1970) ===
In 1970, complaints of pollution in Richland Creek prompted an independent scientific study by a group of university professors called "The Nashville Committee for Scientific Information". The study found that Richland Creek was being polluted not only by private industries but also by the sewer system of Nashville's Metropolitan Government. A 1970 editorial by The Nashville Tennessean said the group was "a group of independent scientists whose only interest is preserving a clean environment." The committee reported massive pollution in Richland Creek by raw sewage from the Metro Government sewer system, as well as by bacteria and industrial wastes from the drainage ditches flowing into the creek.

=== Pollutants ===
The leading pollutants in Richland Creek are:

- Pathogen contamination, principally E. coli (fecal bacteria) arising from sewer overflows, aging sanitary infrastructure, and inputs from stormwater runoff
- Sediment—suspended fine particles from erosion
- Nutrients—Nitrogen, Phosphorus runoff from lawns, fertilization, paved surfaces

== Environmental Protection Agency mandates ==
As of 2016, there continued to be a public health and safety contact advisory placed on Richland Creek because of chronic sewer issues. It is on The Tennessee Department of Environment and Conservation (TDEC) 303(d) "List of Impaired Waterbodies". The U.S. Congress mandated that all states develop a Source Water Assessment Program in the "1966 Safe Drinking Water Act". Tennessee's program was approved by the Environmental Protection Agency (EPA) in 1999. The state produces a document every two years on the status of water quality, known as the 305(b) Report.

The impairment of Richland Creek is by several contaminants, primarily polluted stormwater runoff. Modern standards require sewage and stormwater to be kept separate, but outdated or defective systems can allow them to combine. When stormwater finds its way into the sewer system it overwhelms the capacity of the sewer, causing backup of sewage to overflow into nearby creeks.

In 2011, Montgomery Bell Academy began work on a geothermal installation on school property adjacent to West End Avenue. Sewage was discovered in the material below. Investigation revealed that a sewage line from a nearby fire station had been mistakenly routed to an old stormwater line into Richland Creek instead of to the sanitary sewer. The E. coli values dropped at that site after the repair was made, but further sources of contamination remained.

=== Equalization tanks ===
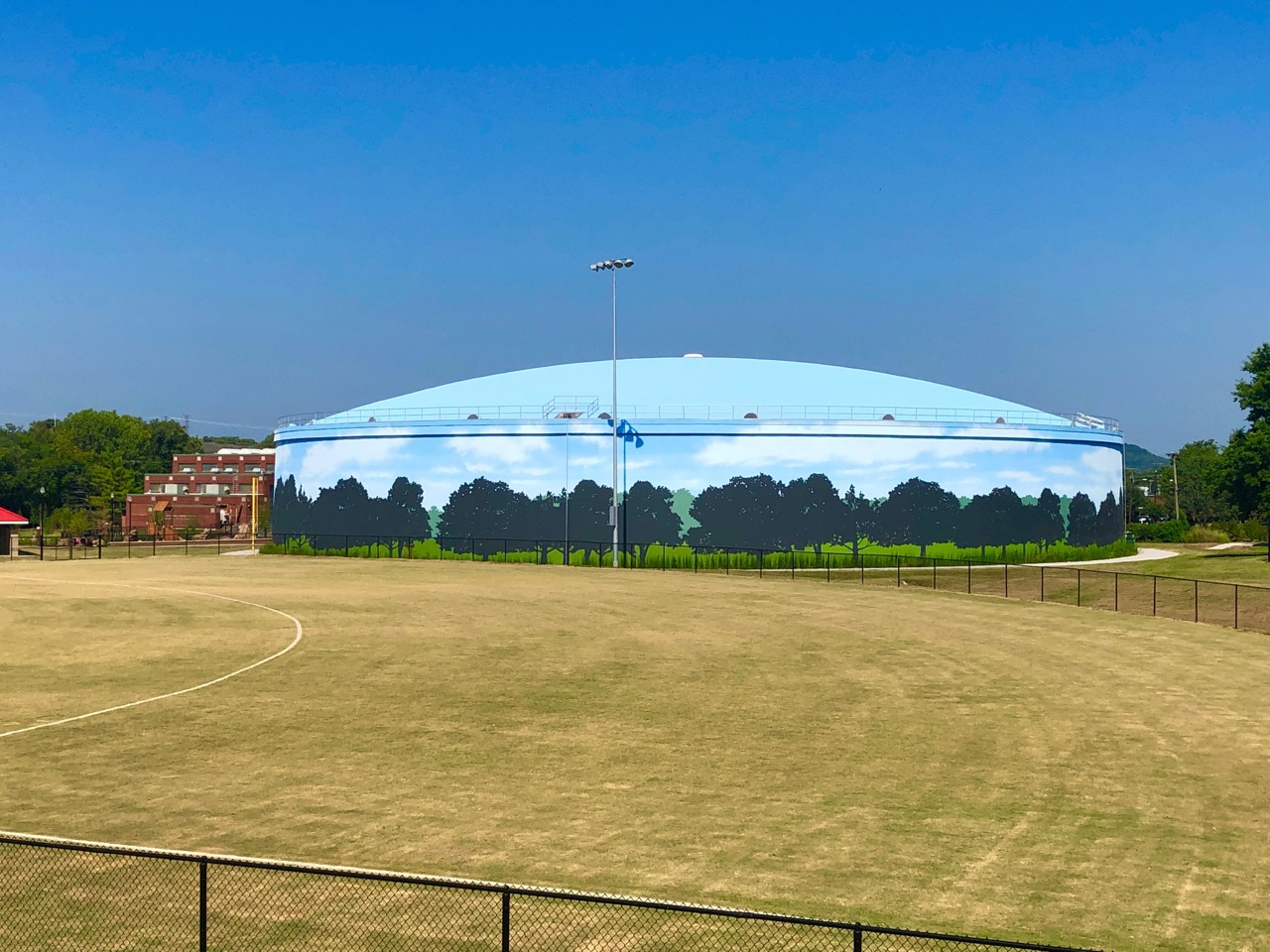
Wastewater equalization tank, West Park, Nashville, Tennessee. Pumping station to left of tank

In 2009 the EPA required correction of sanitary sewer overflows at Richland Creek and other sites in Nashville. The U.S. District Court for the Middle District of Tennessee approved a Consent Decree among the United States, the State of Tennessee, and the Metropolitan Government of Nashville and Davidson County that mandated correction of these sewer overflows, not just at Richland Creek, but at several other sites in the city.

Construction began in 2009 on the West Park Equalization Basin and Wet Weather pump station. Equalization facilities are large holding tanks designed to capture excess flow during wet weather events. The Richland Creek project includes two above-ground tanks large enough to temporarily hold 31,000,000 US gal (120,000,000 L) of liquid if sewer flow exceeds the capacity of the treatment plant. The equalization facilities hold the sewage until the stormwater recedes, then send it to the treatment plant at an optimal processing rate. The project is aided by a wet-weather pump that can handle 41,000,000 US gallons (160,000,000 litres) per day. The West Park Project was dedicated by Mayor David Briley on August 18, 2018, and its site includes recreational facilities such as a lighted softball field, basketball court, picnic area, a pavilion with public rest rooms and other amenities. Artist Eric Henn created a mural on the tank to add public art to the neighborhood.

=== Riparian buffers ===
The City of Belle Meade, Tennessee, that includes a portion of Richland Creek, established requirements that all new construction along community waters must include a riparian buffer of at least 30 feet. A riparian buffer is an uncultivated vegetation zone along a stream that contains a combination of trees, shrubs, or other perennial plants. According to the U.S. Forest Service, these buffers provide conservation benefits by stabilizing creek banks, filtering sediment from runoff, and providing shade, shelter, and food for fish and other aquatic organisms.

== Flooding ==
Richland Creek watershed index map from the Army Corps of Engineers showing increased size of the creek from flooding in 2010.

Richland Creek was involved in severe flooding in 2010, which caused ten deaths in Nashville's Davidson County. It was the largest in the area since 1926. In the aftermath, Metro Government acquired 61 flood-damaged homes in the Delray Drive area along the course of Richland Creek. The homes were demolished to develop England Park— a green space which helps absorb excess water from Richland Creek during any future flooding. The name, "England Park" was in honor of Martha and Andy England who drowned in their home in the flood of 2010. The project was financed by federal and state funding along with stormwater fees paid by residents in every part of the city.

In 2022, the U.S. Army Corps of Engineers received $650,000 for flood risk management design work on Richland Creek as part of the 2022 Disaster Relief Supplemental Appropriations Act, a $22.81 billion federal package supporting nationwide disaster-recovery projects. The funds included $650,000 for engineering and design work for flood risk management on Richland Creek.

=== Flood-related quarry mishap ===
A commercial stone quarry operates near the mouth of Richland Creek. In July 2010, following record flooding, a fault developed in the creek bedrock resulting in a collapse of the earthen divider separating the quarry from the creek. When the divider gave way, the quarry was suddenly inundated with an estimated seven billion gallons of water. To repair the breach, the quarry’s owner sought federal approval to reroute roughly 800 feet of the creek. Environmental groups, including the Richland Creek Watershed Alliance, opposed the plan, arguing that straightening the channel would accelerate flow and harm aquatic habitats. After much citizen input and press coverage, a revised plan was submitted, extending the re-route length to 1,000 feet, sufficient to allow the creek to take a more natural meandering course. The restoration work was completed roughly a year after the 2010 flood.

== Rerouting for commercial development ==
In 2023, the Metro Planning Commission approved rezoning for a proposed large, high-profile redevelopment of the Belle Meade Plaza shopping center near the intersection of White Bridge Road and West End Avenue. Richland Creek runs fairly close, parallel to the rear of the site. The plan includes a partial rerouting of the creek and the creation of a pedestrian “river walk” along its new alignment. The existing shopping center will be transformed into a multi-building mixed-use development featuring condo units, rental apartments, a small hotel and retail space.

The plan calls for demolition of existing buildings and surface parking that presently covers the creek path, thereby daylighting the stream. It creates a planted greenway within a floodway buffer. A Conservation Greenway Easement is proposed to secure public access and provide a pedestrian connection between the internal plaza and the creek-front greenway. Supporters cited the project’s potential to revitalize an aging retail area and improve pedestrian connectivity, while environmental groups and nearby residents voiced concern about traffic congestion and potential effects on the creek’s floodplain and water quality.

== Long-term stability ==
The Richland Creek Watershed Alliance, organized in 2007, is a conservation group to preserve the long term environmental stability of the watershed and has been an advocate of the creek on numerous occasions. As of 2016, the organization has engaged volunteers in removing 51 tons of trash and planted over 1,700 trees along stream corridors.

== Other "Richland Creeks" in Tennessee ==
- A tributary of the Tennessee River in Rhea County (northeast of Chattanooga).
- A branch of the Elk River arising in Maury County (south of Nashville), flowing by Pulaski in Giles County and into the Tennessee River below the border between Tennessee and Alabama.
- A northern branch of the Holston River, about 20 miles northeast of Knoxville, flowing by the town of Rutledge in Grainger County.
- An eastern tributary of the Tennessee River in Humphreys County, about 70 miles west of Nashville.

== See also ==
- Harpeth River
- List of rivers of Tennessee
- Water resource policy
