= Belle Meade, Tennessee =

Belle Meade
- City
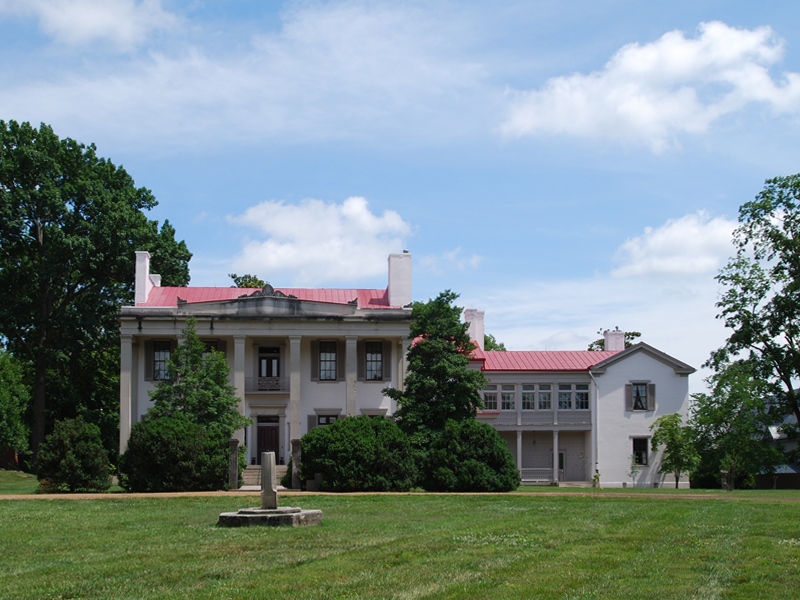
- The namesake of Belle Meade, Belle Meade Plantation

- Flag Seal Logo

- Location of Belle Meade in Davidson County, Tennessee.
- Coordinates: 36°05′45″N 86°51′25″W
- Country: United States
- State: Tennessee
- County: Davidson

Area
  - Total: 3.07 sq mi (7.95 km^{2})
  - Land: 3.07 sq mi (7.95 km^{2})
  - Water: 0 sq mi (0.00 km^{2})
- Elevation: 560 ft (170 m)

Population (2020)
  - Total: 2,901
  - Density: 944.9/sq mi (364.83/km^{2})
- Time zone: UTC-6 (Central (CST))
  - Summer (DST): UTC-5 (CDT)
- Postal code: 37205
- FIPS code: 47-04620
- GNIS feature ID: 1305087
- Website: www.citybellemeade.org

Belle Meade is a suburban city on the west side of Nashville, Tennessee in Davidson County. Its total land area is 3.1 square miles (8.0 km^{2}), and its population was 2,901 at the 2020 census. The city functions as an independent municipality with its own regulations, city hall, and police department, distinct from the Metropolitan Nashville Government (Metro). Residents pay property taxes for these services, and also pay taxes to Metro for fire protection, ambulance service, and other municipal functions. Belle Meade is the wealthiest city in Tennessee. The median annual income of Belle Meade residents is more than $250,000 according to the 2023 American Community Survey by the U.S. Census Bureau. This exceeds the median annual income in the U.S. by more than three times.

Belle Meade traces its origins to Belle Meade Plantation, a 5,300 acres (2,100 ha) estate established in 1807 by John Harding and expanded by his son William Giles Harding, who built an imposing mansion on the property with the labor of enslaved African people. The Civil War took a heavy toll on the plantation, and after subsequent financial setbacks the property was subdivided in 1906. The city of Belle Meade was incorporated in 1938 on part of that land, along with adjoining property that later became Cheekwood Botanical Gardens, portions of Percy Warner Park, the Belle Meade Country Club, and residential development.

Among the early developers, Johnson Bransford commissioned noted landscape architect Ossian Cole Simonds to design the Belle Meade Links subdivision, while Luke Lea, working independently, secured a country club and golf course to relocate there and guided the layout of broad Belle Meade Boulevard, a focal point of the city that terminates at the entrance to Percy Warner Park.

== History ==
Belle Meade Plantation— The Belle Meade Plantation once encompassed a vast estate known internationally for its thoroughbred horse breeding. It was founded by planter John Harding and was passed down to his son, William Giles Harding. Before the Civil War, the younger Harding more than doubled the property and in 1853 built a Greek revival mansion, with the labor of the 136 enslaved African people. At its height, the property grew to an eight-square-mile estate nationally renowned for its thoroughbred horse breeding, noted for a celebrated stallion, Iroquois.

The Civil War— In the Civil War, when the Union Army took control of Nashville, the mansion was pillaged and looted by soldiers who spent weeks quartered there; the owner was imprisoned. In the aftermath, the plantation recovered, but with greatly reduced capacity. Roughly half (72) enslaved persons returned as paid employees after emancipation and lived in their own homes nearby. After a financial downturn in 1893 and later the death of the owner and his heir, the estate was dismantled and sold in parcels in 1906. The property was divided into tracts that eventually would include the city of Belle Meade, Cheekwood Botanical Gardens, Percy Warner Park, Belle Meade Country Club, and various upscale residential areas.

Johnson Bransford— In 1906, the Johnson Bransford Realty Company, acquired roughly 70 acres (28 ha) of land from the Belle Meade Land Company. Over the next nine years (1906–1915), Bransford methodically assembled contiguous parcels of two areas, Belle Meade Links and Deer Park, for a new residential subdivision. Bransford did not want a traditional grid with rectangular blocks when he set out in the 1910s to develop the sites. He engaged landscape architects and city planners of national reputation— people who were familiar with Frederick Law Olmsted's models. He hired O.C. Simonds, with James Roy West as co-planner and engineer, to create a "garden suburb". It was called the Belle Meade Golf Links— platted Nov. 17, 1915.

Luke Lea— In 1910 Luke Lea, a former U.S. Senator and publisher of The Tennessean, joined Telfair Hodgson Jr. (the treasurer of Sewanee: The University of the South) and David Shepherd in purchasing the Belle Meade Company. They initiated the development of the area's principal streets, including Jackson Boulevard and Belle Meade Boulevard. The boulevard is linear, tree-lined thoroughfare was conceived as an extension of the Nashville Railway and Light Company’s West End line to the new subdivisions. In 1913, two lanes divided by a planned streetcar line were laid out, extending from Wilson Boulevard to the area now occupied by the Warner Parks, but the tracks were never built.

Initially, Lea's property sales were slow. The roads were muddy and unpaved, and there was no water line. Recognizing the marketing value of having a golf course nearby, Lea offered to donate a 144-acre (58 ha) tract along Richland Creek to the Nashville Golf and Country Club, then located at the city’s edge. In return for the land, the club agreed to relocate two miles west of its original location, construct a clubhouse and build an 18 hole golf course.

The country club's relocation in 1916 advanced the interests of both Lea and Bransford. With the golf course bordering a large portion of his project, Bransford now began calling his development "Belle Meade Golf Links" to emphasize its proximity to the course.

== Geography ==
According to the United States Census Bureau, the city has a total area of 3.1 square miles (8.0 km^{2}), all land. Belle Meade Boulevard ends at the main historic entrance to Percy Warner Park, the city's largest park, and Richland Creek flows through the neighborhood.

== Demographics ==
Historical population
Census	Pop.	Note	%±
1940	2,061		—
1950	2,831		37.4%
1960	3,082		8.9%
1970	2,933		−4.8%
1980	3,182		8.5%
1990	2,839		−10.8%
2000	2,943		3.7%
2010	2,912		−1.1%
2020	2,901		−0.4%

=== 2020 census ===
As of the 2020 census, Belle Meade had a population of 2,901 and 748 families residing in the city. The median age was 48.2 years, 24.7% of residents were under the age of 18, and 22.6% of residents were 65 years of age or older. For every 100 females there were 96.9 males, and for every 100 females age 18 and over there were 95.4 males age 18 and over.

There were 1,073 households in Belle Meade, of which 35.5% had children under the age of 18 living in them. Of all households, 76.7% were married-couple households, 7.5% were households with a male householder and no spouse or partner present, and 14.0% were households with a female householder and no spouse or partner present. About 15.4% of all households were made up of individuals and 11.0% had someone living alone who was 65 years of age or older.

There were 1,130 housing units, of which 5.0% were vacant. The homeowner vacancy rate was 1.0% and the rental vacancy rate was 1.5%.

95.7% of residents lived in urban areas, while 4.3% lived in rural areas.

Racial composition as of the 2020 census
Race	Number	Percent
White	2,773	95.6%
Black or African American	6	0.2%
American Indian and Alaska Native	1	0.0%
Asian	23	0.8%
Native Hawaiian and Other Pacific Islander	0	0.0%
Some other race	5	0.2%
Two or more races	93	3.2%
Hispanic or Latino (of any race)	52	1.8%

=== 2010 census ===
As of the 2010 census, Belle Meade was a small, densely settled city of 2,912 residents living in 1,074 households, including 872 families. With a population density of 944.2 inhabitants per square mile (364.6/km²), it ranked among the more compact residential communities in the Nashville area. Housing stock totaled 1,162 units, with an average density of 376.8 per square mile (145.5/km²). The racial makeup of the city was 98.2% White, 0.8% Asian, 0.2% African American, 0.1% Native American, 0.2% from other races, and 0.6% from two or more races. Hispanic or Latino residents of any race comprised 0.8% of the population. Households were predominantly married couples living together (77.2%), and more than one-third included children under the age of 18. Non-family households accounted for 18.8% of the total, while individuals living alone made up 17.3%, including 10.4% of households with residents aged 65 or older. The average household size was 2.71, and the average family size was 3.08. The city’s population skewed older than national averages. Residents under the age of 20 comprised 30.9% of the population, while 35.5% were between the ages of 45 and 64, and 18.5% were 65 years of age or older. The median age was 47.1 years. Males numbered 97.6 for every 100 females, a ratio that declined to 92.5 males per 100 females aged 18 and over. According to the American Community Survey 2012–2016 five-year estimates, Belle Meade ranked among the highest-income communities in Tennessee. Median household income was $195,208, and median family income was $228,472. Median income for males was $209,063, compared with $100,125 for females. Per capita income was $129,928, the highest in the state and among the highest in the United States. Despite these figures, 4.4% of families and 4.3% of the population lived below the poverty line, including 1.3% of those under age 18 and 5.1% of those aged 65 or older.

== Economy ==
According to The Wall Street Journal, Belle Meade is the wealthiest city in Tennessee. According to the 2016 five-year estimates of the American Community Survey conducted by the U.S. Census Bureau, the city’s workforce was concentrated primarily in healthcare and social assistance (22%), followed by professional, scientific, and technical services (17.6%), and finance and insurance (15.6%). Smaller shares of employment were found in education services (7.0%), real estate, rental, and leasing (6.9%), manufacturing (6.3%), and retail trade (5.1%)

Occupational data from the same survey showed that management positions accounted for the largest share of employment (28.2%), followed by sales occupations (16.7%) and healthcare practitioners (13.3%). Additional occupations represented in smaller proportions included business and financial operations (7.8%), legal occupations (7.7%), arts, design, and recreation (6.3%), and education, training, and library occupations (6.2%)

== Arts and culture ==
Belle Meade Mansion, built in the 1820s by John Harding,is a primary attraction for those interested in the history and culture of the area. Belle Meade Plantation, now renamed "Belle Meade Historic Site and Winery", is home to a number of historical buildings, including Dunham Station's cabin and a Victorian-style manor that houses a museum filled with artifacts that once belonged to the Harding family.

Cheekwood Estate and Gardens – now a 55-acre botanical garden and museum of art – is the former home of Leslie and Mabel Cheek. Located just outside the southwestern boundary of Belle Meade, the attraction hosts world-renowned art exhibits, festivals, and family events throughout the year.

== Parks and recreation ==
Belle Meade Country Club – This members-only club is home to an 18-hole, par 72, 6,885-yard golf course and various other amenities, including a fitness complex, tennis courts, and a pool. Use of the club requires membership – a lengthy and challenging process. The Wall Street Journal called the club "the hottest ticket in town among newly transplanted corporate executives and music entrepreneurs." Originally designed by architect Donald J. Ross and later renovated by architects Rees Jones and Bryce Swanson, the course has Bermuda grass fairways and bent grass greens and was rated by Golf Digest as a top Tennessee course in 2005–2006.

Percy Warner Golf Course – This golf course is located in the northeastern corner of Percy Warner Park at the southwestern edge of Belle Meade. It is a 9-hole, par 34, 2,600-yard course with tree-lined fairways. Historically, the site was called Camp Andrew Jackson an army training camp during WW I. The course uses a first-come, first-served, open play concept, and greens and rental cart fees are modest. Rental clubs and pull carts are also available, and private carts are allowed for a fee.

Percy Warner Park and Edwin Warner Park – They are technically two connecting parks, but Nashville locals often refer to Percy Warner Park and Edwin Warner Park simply as "The Warner Parks". Percy and Edwin Warner were brothers, sons of James C. Warner, president of Nashville Power and light Company (predecessor of Nashville Electric Service). The northern border of Percy Warner Park lies at the southwestern edge of Belle Meade. Combined, the parks include more than 3,100 acres. Amenities include picnic grounds and shelters, a nature center, hiking and biking trails, scenic overlooks, sports fields, horse trails, an equestrian center, and two golf courses, .

The parks also have historical significance and are listed in the National Register of Historic Places. Luke Lea and his second wife, Percie Warner, (Note: Percy Warner gave his daughter the same name, but spelled hers Percie. This often leads to confusion in later historical summaries) donated almost 900 acres of land – a large portion of which came from the former Belle Meade Plantation – to establish the park in 1927. Margaret Warner, the widow of Percy Warner, donated the funds to erect the sandstone gates and stone eagles that have marked the entrance of Percy Warner Park since 1932. The limestone staircase known as The Allée was designed by landscape architect Bryant Fleming and built in the mid-1930s to mark the entrance to Percy Warner Park at Belle Meade Boulevard.

Other historical sites in the park include 10 pre-Civil War cemeteries and a World War I memorial that honors Camp Andrew Jackson, a WWI army training site previously located at the site of Percy Warner Golf Course.

Parmer Park – Located on a section of land that used to be the home of Parmer School, which burned in the 1980s, this park consists of open green space, basketball courts, playground equipment, and a baseball field. The entrance of the former school still stands in the middle of the park.

== Government and politics ==
After its incorporation in 1938, the City of Belle Meade was absorbed into the metropolitan government of Nashville-Davidson County in 1963, but it retained its independent city status. Residents pay taxes both to the Metro government and to the City of Belle Meade. Belle Meade streets have distinct signage, and the city has its own police force, mayor, city hall, and weekly chipper service. Many houses in the city have been listed on the National Register of Historic Places since July 7, 2004.

The vast majority of the Belle Meade area is designated as ZIP code 37205. A few homes are in ZIP code 37215. Rusty Moore is the current mayor. His term expires in November 2026. Belle Meade has its own city charter separate from Metro Nashville. It is a city manager-commissioner structure. Policy is made and carried out by a board of commissioners, and the city manager serves as the chief administrative officer. Five commissioners are elected by the residents and serve four-year terms. Those commissioners then elect two members to serve as mayor and vice-mayor for shorter terms of two years.

The mayor of Belle Meade as of 2025 is Rusty Moore, and the vice-mayor is Haley Dale. The three other commissioners include:

- Louise Bryan – term ending November 2026
- Neil Clayton – term ending November 2026
- Tom Starkey – term ending November 2028

According to the annual audit report ending June 30, 2017, the City of Belle Meade had total annual revenues of $6,191,617 and total annual operating expenses of $3,918,521. The city's total net position as of June 30, 2017, was $20,412,803. The city's primary sources of revenue are property taxes and state sales and income taxes.

Belle Meade is part of State House District 56 for the Tennessee General Assembly. The city is part of State Senate District 20, with Heidi Campbell (politician) as the current state senator for the district. At the national level, Belle Meade is in Congressional District 5 in Tennessee, and Andy Ogles is the current representative for the district.

=== Political makeup ===
Belle Meade votes Republican in statewide elections and is one of the most Republican‑leaning incorporated cities in Davidson County.

Belle Meade Presidential election results
Year	Republican	Democratic	Third parties
2024	56.94% 1,120	41.08% 808	1.98% 39
2020	56.44% 1,108	41.57% 816	1.99% 39
2016	58.07% 1,051	35.58% 644	6.35% 115

== Education ==
Belle Meade is part of the Metropolitan Nashville Public Schools District. No public schools are located inside the city's boundaries, but various public schools are located nearby, including Julia Green Elementary (grades K-4), H.G. Hill Middle School (grades 5–8), and Hillwood Comp High School (grades 9–12). Additionally, several private schools are located very near the perimeter, including Harding Academy, Harpeth Hall School, Montgomery Bell Academy, and The Ensworth School.

- Harding Academy is a PreK-8, coeducational private school founded in 1971 during the period of public school desegregation in Nashville. The school has declared a policy of nondiscrimination. In 2018 enrollment was 493, with an average class size of 18 and an 8:1 student to teacher ratio. Approximately 68% of the teachers on staff had advanced degrees.
- Harpeth Hall School is a private school for girls in grades 5–12. Founded in 1865, in 2018 it had an enrollment of 689, with an average class size of 14. Various extracurricular activities are available in addition to academics.
- Montgomery Bell Academy is a private school founded in 1867 for boys in grades 7–12. Current enrollment is 850 students, with a student to teacher ratio of 7.5:1 and an average class size of 13. Approximately 74% of the faculty has advanced degrees.
- The Ensworth School's Lower/Middle School campus is located just northeast of Belle Meade. In 2018 it had an enrollment of 423 in the lower school and 248 in the middle school, and approximately 67% of teachers had advanced degrees. The student to teacher ratio was 7:1 with an average class size of 15. Extracurricular activities include swimming, ice hockey, and lacrosse.

Several colleges and universities are located within a few miles of Belle Meade, including Vanderbilt University, Nashville State Community College, Tennessee College of Applied Technology, and Aquinas College.

== Infrastructure ==
Belle Meade has its own Public Works Department offering trash pickup; recycling service for paper, boxes, some plastics, and metal and aluminum cans; and brush and chipper services for lawn and landscaping debris. The city also maintains its own pressure sewer system.

The city maintains its own police department and offers various services to the community in addition to routine policing. Those services include a neighborhood watch program, fingerprinting, prescription drug collection, house check service when owners are out of town, and hiring of off-duty officers for special events.

== Notable people ==
Belle Meade residents include former U.S. vice president and 2000 presidential candidate Al Gore; entertainers Vince Gill and Amy Grant; Sports announcer Jim Nantz; Pulitzer Prize winning author Jon Meacham; Chief Justice of the Tennessee Supreme Court Frank Drowota; co-founder and former CEO of Hospital Corporation of America Thomas F. Frist, Jr.; Frist's son, investor Thomas F. Frist, III; convicted cocaine smuggler Russell W. Brothers; fast food business executive C. Stephen Lynn; and chairman and CEO of Ingram Content Group John R. Ingram.
