= Belle Meade Plantation =

Historic house in Tennessee, United States

- Belle Meade Historic Site and Winery
- U.S. National Register of Historic Places
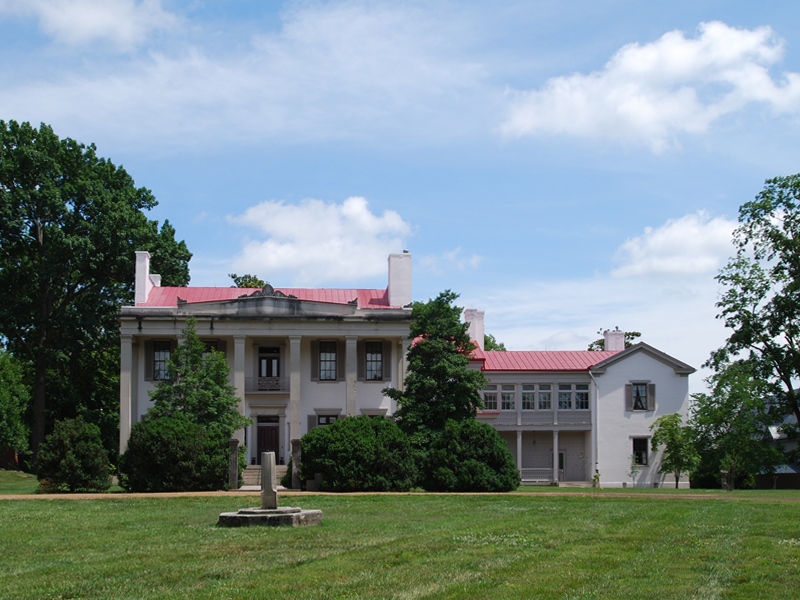
- Belle Meade Historic Site and Winery

- Location within Tennessee Location within the United States
- Location: 5025 Harding Pike; Belle Meade, Tennessee
- Coordinates: 36°6′20″N 86°51′54″W
- Built: 1807
- Architectural style: Greek Revival
- NRHP reference No.: 69000177
- Added to NRHP: December 30, 1969

Belle Meade Plantation, now officially titled Belle Meade Historic Site and Winery, is a historic farm established in 1807 in Nashville, Tennessee, built, owned, and controlled by five generations of the Harding-Jackson family for nearly a century. The farm, named "Belle Meade" (beautiful meadow), grew to encompass 5,400 acres (22 km^{2}) at its zenith and used a labor force of 136, including enslaved workers. The farm's centerpiece was a Greek revival mansion built in 1853. Belle Meade Farm gained a national reputation in the latter half of the 19th century for breeding thoroughbred horse racing stock, notably a celebrated stallion, Iroquois. In the Civil War, when the Union Army took control of Nashville, the mansion was pillaged and looted by soldiers who spent weeks quartered there; the owner was imprisoned. In the aftermath, the plantation recovered, but with greatly reduced capacity. Roughly half of the enslaved persons returned as paid employees after the war and lived in their own homes nearby. After a financial downturn in 1893 and later the death of the owner and his heir, the estate was dismantled and sold in parcels in 1906.

Much of the vast area of the original plantation became incorporated in 1938 as the City of Belle Meade that became an upscale residential area that included Nashville's Cheekwood Botanical Gardens, Percy Warner Park, and The Belle Meade Country Club. Since 1953, the mansion has been administered in trust by the Association for the Preservation of Tennessee Antiquities, a private non-profit corporation. In the 1970s, it was listed on the National Register of Historic Places.

The historic site is now operated as an attraction, museum, winery (non-profit), and onsite restaurant together with various outbuildings on 30 remaining acres of property. Many original outbuildings are preserved, including a dairy, gardener's house, carriage house, stable, mausoleum, and the original Harding Cabin. Since the 1990s, the management has made an effort to reconcile the past by featuring stories of African Americans who worked there before and after emancipation.

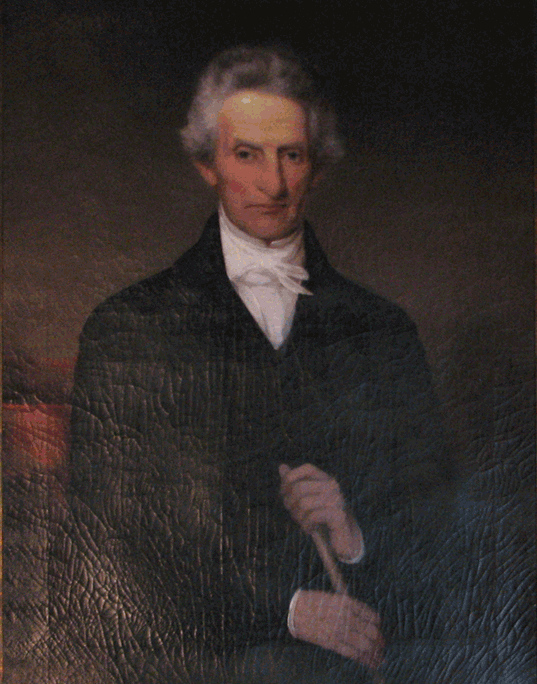
John Harding, the founder of Belle Meade.

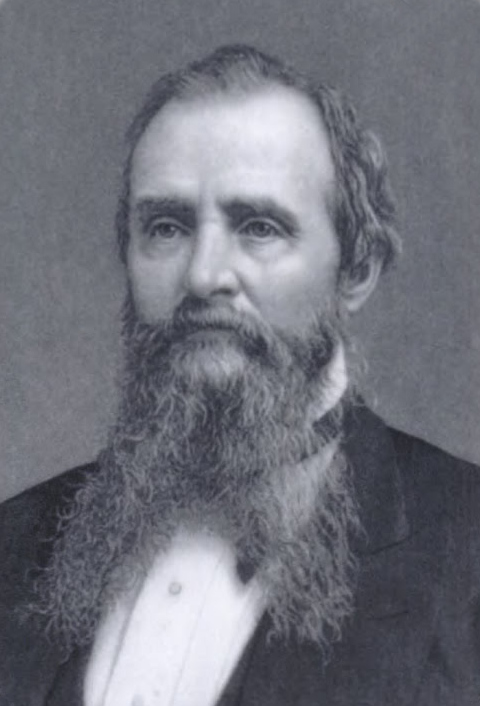
His son William Giles Harding, the second owner of Belle Meade, who inherited it in 1839 and greatly expanded it after the Civil War.

== Mansion and grounds ==
=== Architecture ===
John Harding bought a cabin and 250 acres (100 ha) near the Natchez Trace; enslaved people began to clear and develop the land. They also built their own slave quarters, which are documented as two-family cabins.

In the 1820s Harding commissioned the first red brick Federal-style house on a small hill near Richland Creek. The entrance façade featured a two-story, five-bay block constructed on a limestone foundation and flanked with symmetrical one-story wings. Chimneys flanked the central block as well as the two hyphens (wings).

His son William Giles Harding took over operating Belle Meade in 1839, as his father was developing another farm in Arkansas. William G. Harding began to acquire more land for breeding and raising high-quality livestock, first emphasizing thoroughbred horses and adding cattle, sheep, and other breeds. He ultimately owned 5,400 acres (2,200 ha). In 1853, he had the house altered and enlarged in a Greek-Revival style. Stucco was applied to cover the red bricks, and a two-story veranda was created on the central block, featuring six solid limestone pillars quarried at Belle Meade and styled in the Doric order. A solid limestone pediment entablature is set above the columns.

A two-story kitchen extension was attached to the house via a two-level breezeway. This was customary to keep the heat of the kitchen away from the main house. The breezeway was enclosed in the 20th century by successive families living at Belle Meade. Through the 1880s and 1890s a Dairy, Carriage House, and Stable were also added. William G. Harding had a mausoleum built in 1839 for the interment of family members.

=== Interior ===
The 14 feet (4.3 m) high central Entrance Hall runs the full length of the house from west to east, following the prevailing wind direction for natural cooling. The walls display thoroughbred horse paintings by 19th-century painters Edward Troye, Harry Hall, Henry Stull, Herbert Kittredge, and Henri De Lattre that depict some of the most famous horses. On the north end of the hall, double parlors feature wood of the tulip poplar, Tennessee's state tree. The library and dining rooms are found to the south. These rooms feature portraits of the Harding family and chandeliers that were once lit with methane gas.

The central hall configuration is found on the second and third floors as well, accessed by the winding cantilevered, Second Empire-style staircase carved from cherry. The second floor contains two connected bedrooms to the north and a guest bedroom and master bedroom to the south. William Hicks Jackson, son-in-law of William Giles Harding, modernized the interior of the house in 1883, adding three full bathrooms, complete with hot and cold running water. In 1907, just after being sold, the home was outfitted with an additional bathroom complete with a surrounding needlepoint shower which was believed to help circulation and those suffering from arthritis. The third level is known as a garret and has two single rooms flanking the central hall with 8 feet (2.4 m) high ceilings.

The Mansion also has a cellar, which was uncommon at the time. It contained a steam engine and a boiler to power the hot and cold running water for the home.

=== Grounds ===
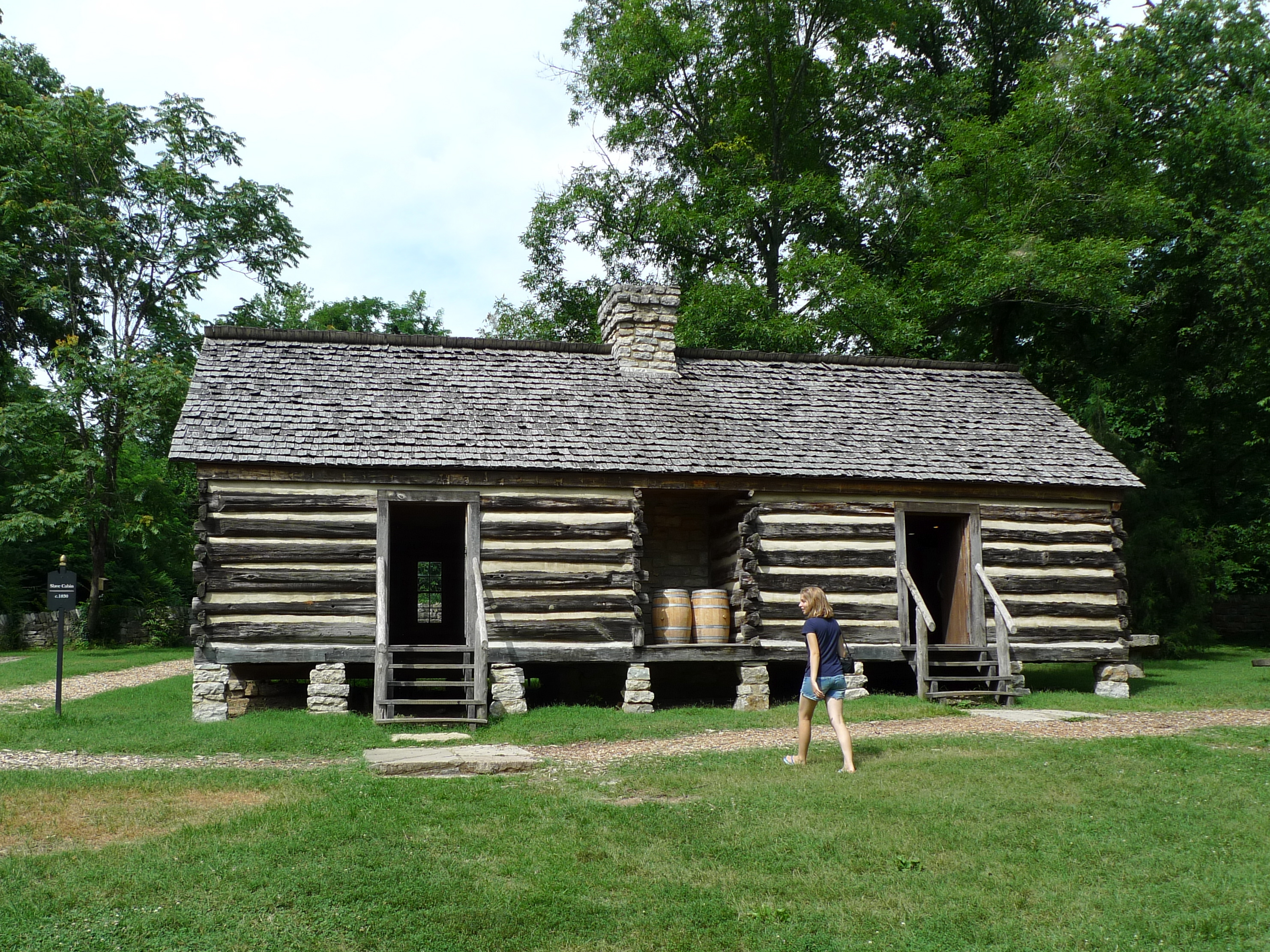
Reconstructed slave quarters

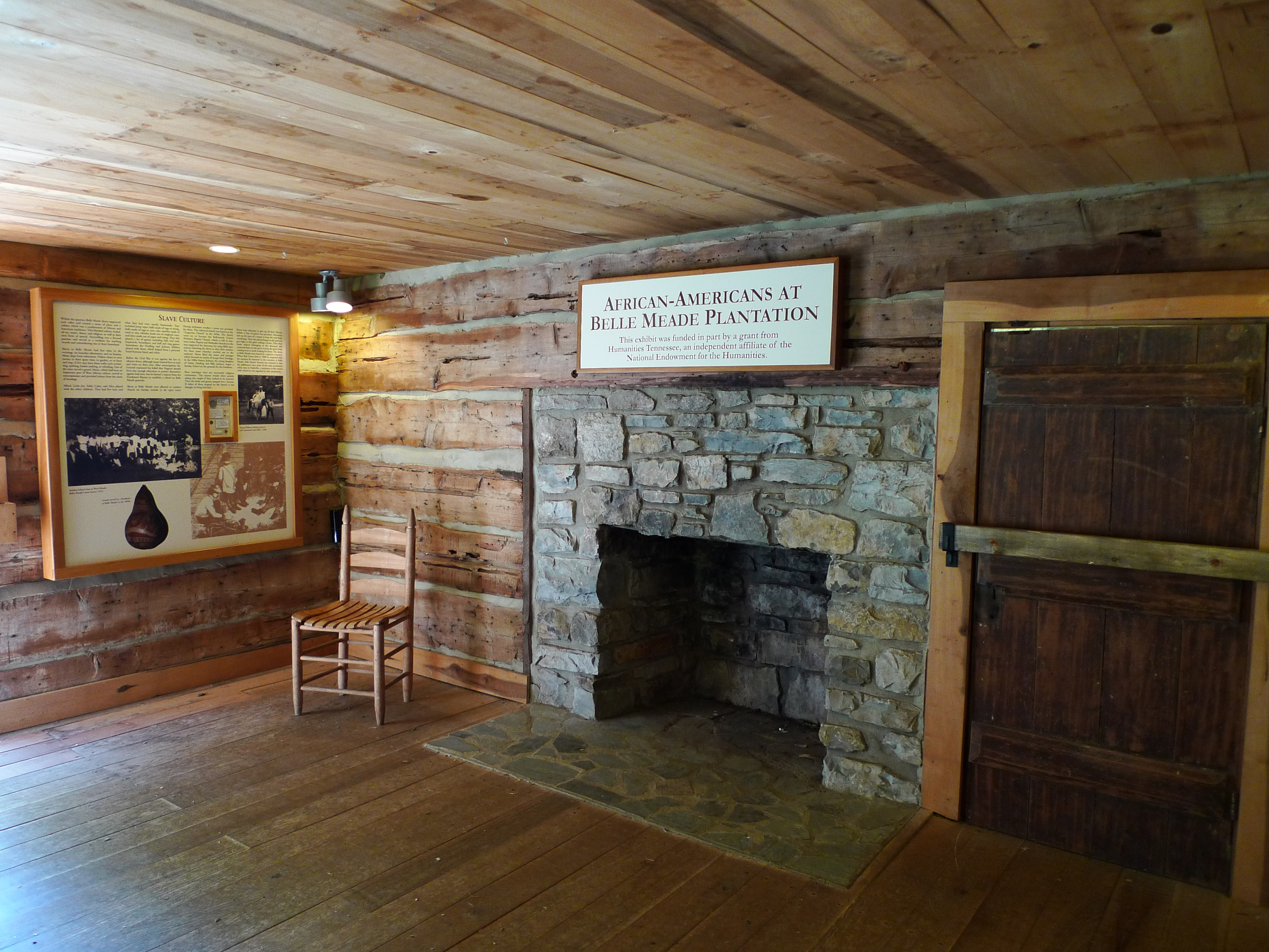
Interior of the reconstructed slave quarters

Today, Belle Meade's grounds cover 30 acres (120,000 m^{2}) and have 10 outbuildings scattered throughout the estate, including the original 1790s log cabin purchased by John Harding in 1807 with the property. Harding added the Smokehouse in 1826, and through various expansions, became the largest in the South. As much as 20,000 pounds (9 t) of pork was recorded as smoked here annually.

Other buildings that were added later by William G. Harding and his Harding-Jackson descendants include: an 1870s Children's Playhouse that was used by the Harding children, the 1884 Dairy that supplied fresh milk, cream, cheese, and produced up to 240 pounds (110 kg) of butter each week, the 1892 Carriage and Stable House showcases the Harding and Jackson families' carriage collection and includes one of the most impressive carriage collections to be found.

A Visitors' Center was constructed on the grounds in 1990 to serve as a central point for guests to arrive, sell tickets and serve as a Gift Shop. In 2009, Belle Meade opened Nashville's first Winery; it features Tennessee red and white wines made from the native southern grape, the muscadine, and blackberry fruit. Additionally, the onsite restaurant, the Belle Meade Meat and Three, offers smoked meats, fresh cooked vegetables, biscuits, cornbread and homemade desserts.

The landscape and drainage was designed by Ossian Cole Simonds in the 1910s. His design emphasized the landscape's topography and created the first pocket parks in Nashville.

== History ==
In 1807, Virginian John Harding bought Dunham's Station log cabin and 250 acres (100 ha) on the Natchez Trace, an ancient Native American path connecting their settlements in present-day Tennessee and Mississippi. He began to develop a farm, naming it "Belle Meade" — French/Old English for "beautiful meadow". Harding operated various businesses, such as a blacksmith shop, cotton gin, and grist and saw mills. By 1816, Harding was boarding horses for neighbors such as Andrew Jackson and breeding thoroughbreds, as well as racing them. Middle Tennessee became known for raising purebred livestock, including cattle, sheep and horses. In 1823 Harding registered his own racing silks with the Nashville Jockey Club (an association of thoroughbred owners). He trained horses on the track at his farm at McSpadden's Bend, which he bought for his son William.

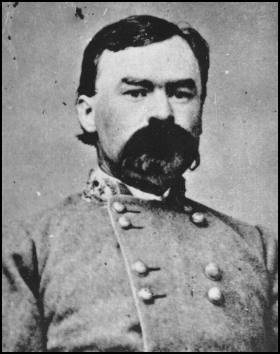
Confederate General William Hicks Jackson, husband of Selene (Harding); they were the third owners of Belle Meade.

William Giles Harding first worked the McSpadden Bend property along the Cumberland River. He inherited Belle Meade in 1839. During the following decades he acquired additional property to total 5,400-acre (22 km^{2}); by the time of the Civil War, he held 136 enslaved African Americans. In 1853 he incorporated his father's house into a much larger mansion. William Giles Harding would marry Elizabeth McGavock of Carnton; they had two daughters who survived to adulthood named Selene and Mary. With the onset of the Civil War in 1861, Harding had to suspend his racing and breeding operations. As a staunch supporter of the Confederate States of America, he donated $20,000 of his own money, and raised $500,000 total to the costs of the Confederate States Army. In return he was made a Brigadier General and placed in charge of the Nashville Munitions Factory. After Union forces took control of Nashville in April 1862, Harding was arrested. He was sent North and imprisoned in Fort Mackinac in Michigan for six months before paying a $20,000 bond and signing the oath of allegiance to the United States before being released under house arrest at Belle Meade.

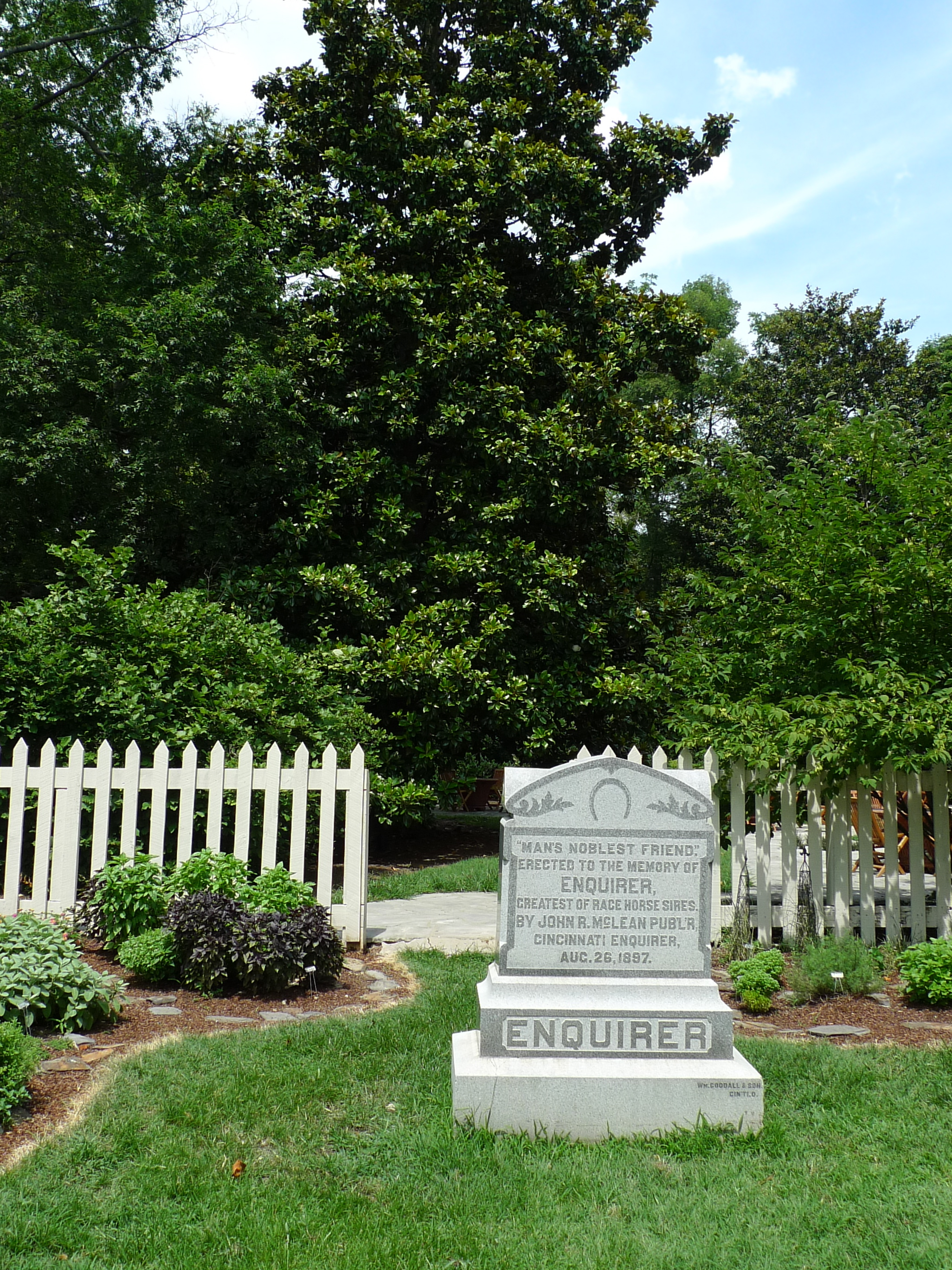
A gravestone for the stallion Enquirer

Confederate General James Chalmers occupied Belle Meade as his headquarters during the Battle of Nashville. Early on December 15, 1864, Union and Confederate forces fought at the family's racetrack about a mile northeast of the Mansion

After the Civil War, Harding resumed his successful horse farming operations with a reduced workforce. Of the 136 enslaved people who worked and lived at Belle Meade prior to the war, 72 chose to work for pay with Harding immediately after slavery's end. Most lived in housing off the property though some would continue to live in cabins on site. Everyone who remained as paid staff had to sign a contract of "18 Rules & Regulations" that included fines for breaking any of them.

In 1868, Harding's eldest daughter Selene married William Hicks Jackson, a friend of the family from before the Civil War. He had served in the Confederate Army, reaching the rank of Brigadier General. William Guiles Harding agreed to the marriage if the couple agreed to live at Belle Meade following their wedding. Selene managed the household affairs, and Jackson co-managed the farm with his father-in-law Harding. Among their children were son William Harding Jackson (1874–1903), Eunice Jackson Marks, and Selene Jackson Elliston.

In 1875, Harding and Jackson decided to retire the racing silks and focus exclusively on breeding. Harding held annual yearling sales, sometimes at Belle Meade, and on some occasions taking the horses by train to Long Island, New York. The two men developed Belle Meade into a nationally renowned thoroughbred farm and showplace for high-quality livestock. The farm also sold breeding stock of ponies, Alderney cattle, Cotswold sheep, and Cashmere goats. The estate also featured a 500-acre deer park. Belle Meade had many successful thoroughbred studs, including Bonnie Scotland and Enquirer, whose bloodlines long dominated racing in America. Jackson attracted international fame in 1886 by buying the stallion Iroquois to stand at stud; the horse was ranked in 1892 as the leading sire in the United States. In 1881, Iroquois was the first American-bred Thoroughbred to win the Epsom Derby in England.

Jackson enjoyed the sport of live bird wing shooting. He donated a parcel of land on the estate to build a shooting lodge, and founded the Belle Meade Gun Club in 1898. The club hosted the U.S. Wing Shot Championship in October, 1998. Celebrity exhibition marksman, Annie Oakley, visited the Belle Meade Gun Club on October 26, 1899, as a special guest in a shooting competition.

William Hicks Jackson died in 1903, and his adult son, William Harding Jackson, died later the same year from Typhoid fever.

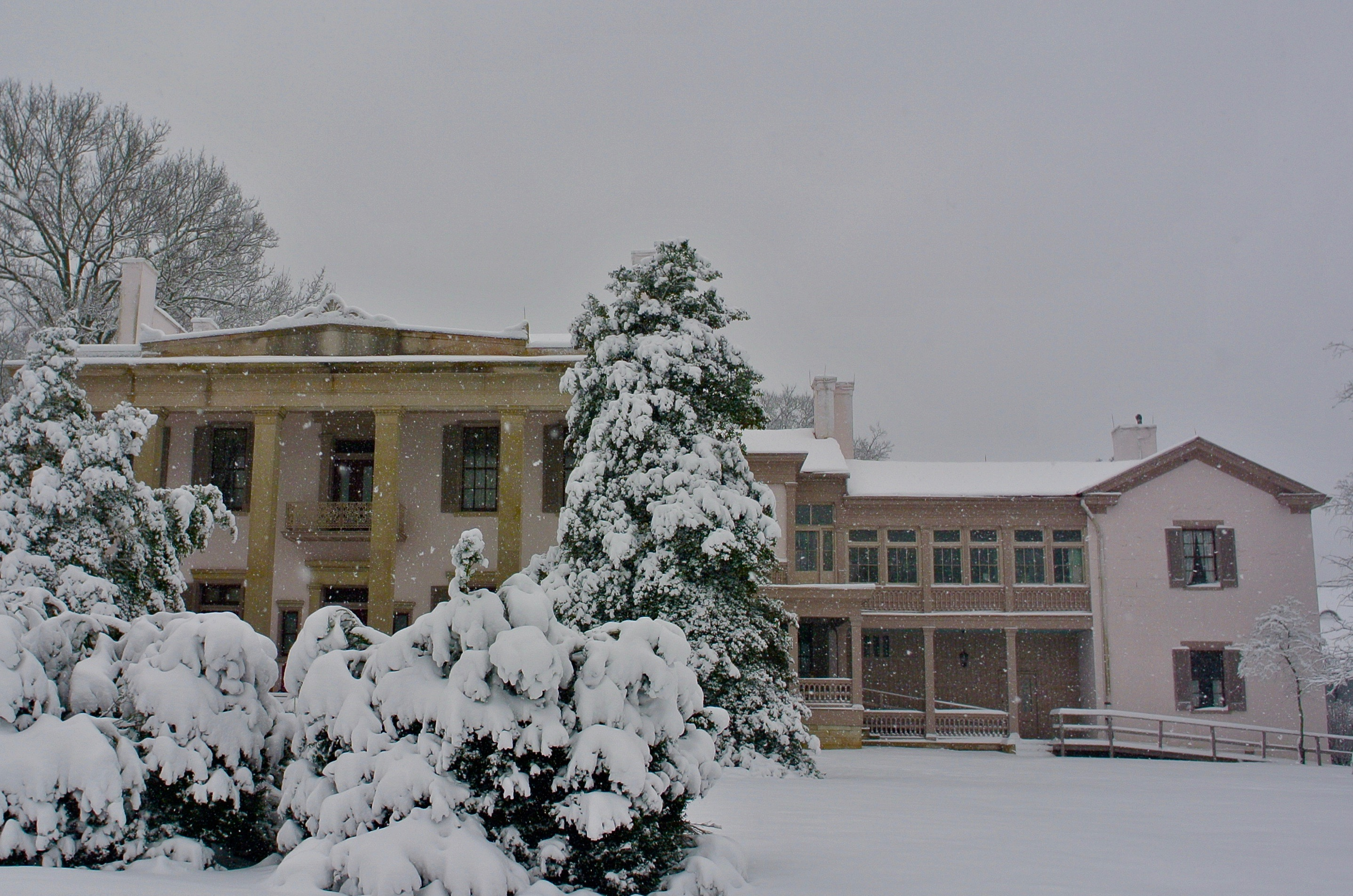
Snowfall at the Belle Meade Plantation from the 2016 blizzard.

Due to financial problems since the Panic of 1893 combined with the advent of baseball, which meant that horse racing was no longer the top American sport, and the temperance movement against horse racing and associated gambling, the trustee of the estate decided to sell Belle Meade in 1906.

A business syndicate called The Belle Meade Land Company purchased a large portion of the Belle Meade acreage to develop a residential community that would also be called "Belle Meade". After raising private donations, the company released the deer from the fenced park. In 1938, most of Belle Meade's former acreage was incorporated into the independent city of Belle Meade, Tennessee.

The Mansion and 30 acres (12 ha) were preserved by private owners. Five other families would live in the home until 1953, when the State of Tennessee bought the Mansion and eight outbuildings on the property to ensure its preservation. The state deeded the property to the Association for the Preservation of Tennessee Antiquities. It is operated as an attraction, museum, winery and onsite restaurant. In the 1970s, it was listed on the National Register of Historic Places.
