= McGavock =

McGavock may refer to:

== People ==
- Randal McGavock (1766–1843), Mayor of Nashville, Tennessee from 1824 to 1825
- John McGavock (1815–1893), Southern planter in Nashville, Tennessee
- Randal William McGavock (1826–1863), Southern planter, Mayor of Nashville, Tennessee from 1858 to 1859
- Jacob McGavock Dickinson (1851–1928), United States Secretary of War from 1909 to 1911.

== Places ==
- McGavock Family Cemetery, a cemetery in Fort Chiswell, Virginia
- David S. McGavock House, near Dublin, Virginia.
- McGavock Confederate Cemetery, a Confederate cemetery in Franklin, Tennessee
- McGavock–Gaines House in Franklin, Tennessee
- McGavock-Gatewood-Webb House, historic house in Nashville, Tennessee
- McGavock Elementary School, a public elementary school in Nashville, Tennessee
- McGavock Comprehensive High School, a public high school in Nashville, Tennessee
- McGavock Lake Water Aerodrome in Canada
