= Mariah Reddick =

American slave, nurse, and midwife

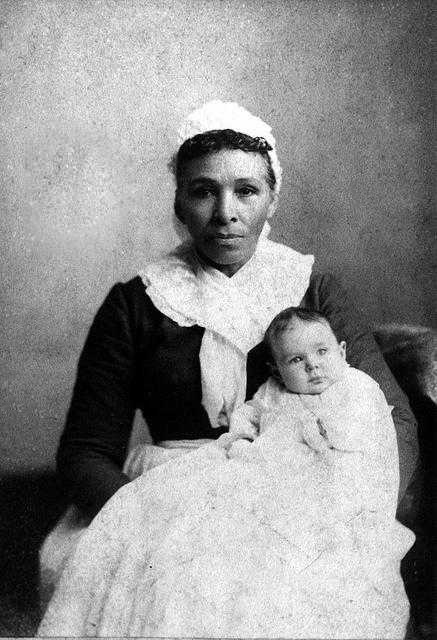
- Reddick holding Carrie Winder Cowan in 1885.
- Born: c. 1832; Mississippi, U.S.
- Died: December 14, 1922; Franklin, Tennessee, U.S.
- Resting place: Toussaint L'Ouverture County Cemetery
- Other names: Aunt Maria; Mariah Otey
- Occupations: slave, housekeeper, nurse, midwife
- Spouse(s): Harvey Otey (1818–1863; his death); Bollen Reddick (1835–1910; his death)
- Children: 11

Mariah Bell Otey Reddick (1832–1922) was an American midwife, nurse, and domestic worker who was held as a slave at Carnton Plantation in Franklin, Tennessee. She worked for the family of Colonel John McGavock for four generations, both as a house slave and as a freedwoman. At Carnton, Reddick was the head of the household staff and also worked as a maid, nanny, and midwife for the family. During the American Civil War, she was sent to Montgomery, Alabama to stay at the home of Varina Davis' mother, Margaret Kempe Howell. During this time, she was employed as a nurse by the surgeon W.M. Gentry. After the war, Reddick was a favorite midwife of the women of Franklin's high society.

== Biography ==
Reddick was born in Mississippi in about 1832. She was held as a slave by Colonel Van Perkins Winder and Martha Grundy Winder of Ducros Plantation in Schriever, Louisiana. In December 1848, she was given to the Winder's daughter, Carrie Elizabeth Winder, as a wedding present upon her marriage to Colonel John McGavock, son of Randal McGavock of Carnton Plantation in Franklin, Tennessee. Reddick was a personal house slave for Carrie Winder McGavock at Carnton and at St. Bridget, the McGavock's sugar plantation in Louisiana. Reddick worked for four generations of the McGavock family at Carnton as a nurse, maid, midwife, and head of the household staff.

The McGavocks arranged Reddick's marriage to her first husband, Harvey Otey, who was fourteen years her senior. They had eight children together. Two of their children, who were twins, were stillborn.

During the American Civil War, the McGavocks sent Reddick, who was pregnant at the time, to Montgomery, Alabama to prevent her from being freed by the Union Army. She went without her husband and children and stayed at the home of Margaret Louisa Kempe Howell, the mother of Confederate First Lady Varina Howell Davis and mother-in-law of Confederate President Jefferson Davis. Reddick gave birth to her eighth child in Alabama and, less than a month after she left Tennessee, her husband died.

While in Montgomery, Reddick worked for the surgeon Dr. W.M. Gentry, assisting him as a nurse. During this time, she met Bolen Reddick, whom she later married. They had one son, John Watt Reddick.

After the war, Reddick returned to Carnton as a freedwoman and continued to work for the McGavock family. She became the favorite midwife for Franklin's women of high society. She served as a nanny for the children of Hattie McGavock Cowan.

Reddick lived near the "Bucket of Blood" neighborhood in Franklin, close to the railroad depot, before moving to a house on Columbia Avenue, just north of the Carter House. In 1906, she purchased a portrait of Toussaint Louverture, leader of the Haitian Revolution, and hung it in her home.

She died on December 14, 1922, and is buried at Toussaint L'Ouverture County Cemetery.

== Legacy ==
Reddick is the basis of the fictional main character, with the same name, in the book The Orphan Mother by Robert Hicks.
