= Margaret Kempe Howell =

19th-century American planter and slaveowner

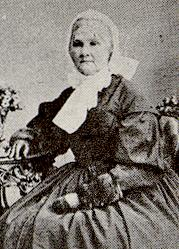
- Born: Margaret Louisa Kempe; January 6, 1806; Prince William County, Virginia, U.S.
- Died: November 24, 1867 (aged 61); Quebec, Canada
- Resting place: Cimetière Mont-Royal
- Occupations: heiress, planter, slave owner
- Spouse: William Burr Howell
- Children: 11 (including Varina Davis)
- Parents: James Kempe (father); Margaret Graham (mother)
- Relatives: Jefferson Davis (son-in-law)

Margaret Louisa Kempe Howell (January 6, 1806 – November 24, 1867) was an American heiress, planter, and slaveowner who was the mother of Confederate First Lady Varina Davis and mother-in-law of Confederate President Jefferson Davis. Upon her marriage to the son of New Jersey Governor Richard Howell, her father granted her a dowry of sixty slaves and two thousand acres of land in Mississippi. She and her husband faced financial difficulties throughout their lives and depended on the support of her family. After their plantation was seized by creditors, they rented a mansion known as The Briars from John Perkins Sr. Following the American Civil War, Howell fled to Canada, where she died.

== Early life and family ==
Howell was born Margaret Louisa Kempe on January 6, 1806, in Prince William County, Virginia to Colonel James Kempe and Margaret Graham Kempe. Her father, a Scots-Irish immigrant from Ulster, became a wealthy planter and major landowner in Virginia, Mississippi, and Louisiana. Her mother was the illegitimate daughter of George Graham, a Scottish immigrant and planter, and Susanna McAllister, a Virginian woman. Howell's father served as an officer in the Mississippi Commands during the War of 1812, commanding a company at New Orleans and at Pensacola.

The Howell family moved from Virginia to Mississippi before 1816 to reside at one of their plantations.

== Adult life ==
In 1823, she married William Burr Howell, the son of New Jersey Governor Richard Howell, in Natchez. Her father gave her a dowry of two thousand acres of land in Mississippi and sixty slaves. Joseph Emory Davis, a school friend of hers, was a groomsman at the wedding. She later named her first son after him. They had eleven children, seven of whom survived to adulthood. One of her daughters, Varina, would later marry Jefferson Davis, the brother of Joseph, and serve as First Lady of the Confederate States of America.

In 1825, Howell and her husband went north to improve the health of their eldest son, Joseph Davis Howell. The Howells were accompanied by Joseph E. Davis and their child's nurse. They traveled in a carriage led by two horse to the crossing of the Ohio River, where they took a boat to Brownsville. During their journey, they met English caricaturist George Cruikshank and the Indiana politician Robert Dale Owen. They eventually reached New York and visited the young Jefferson Davis at West Point.

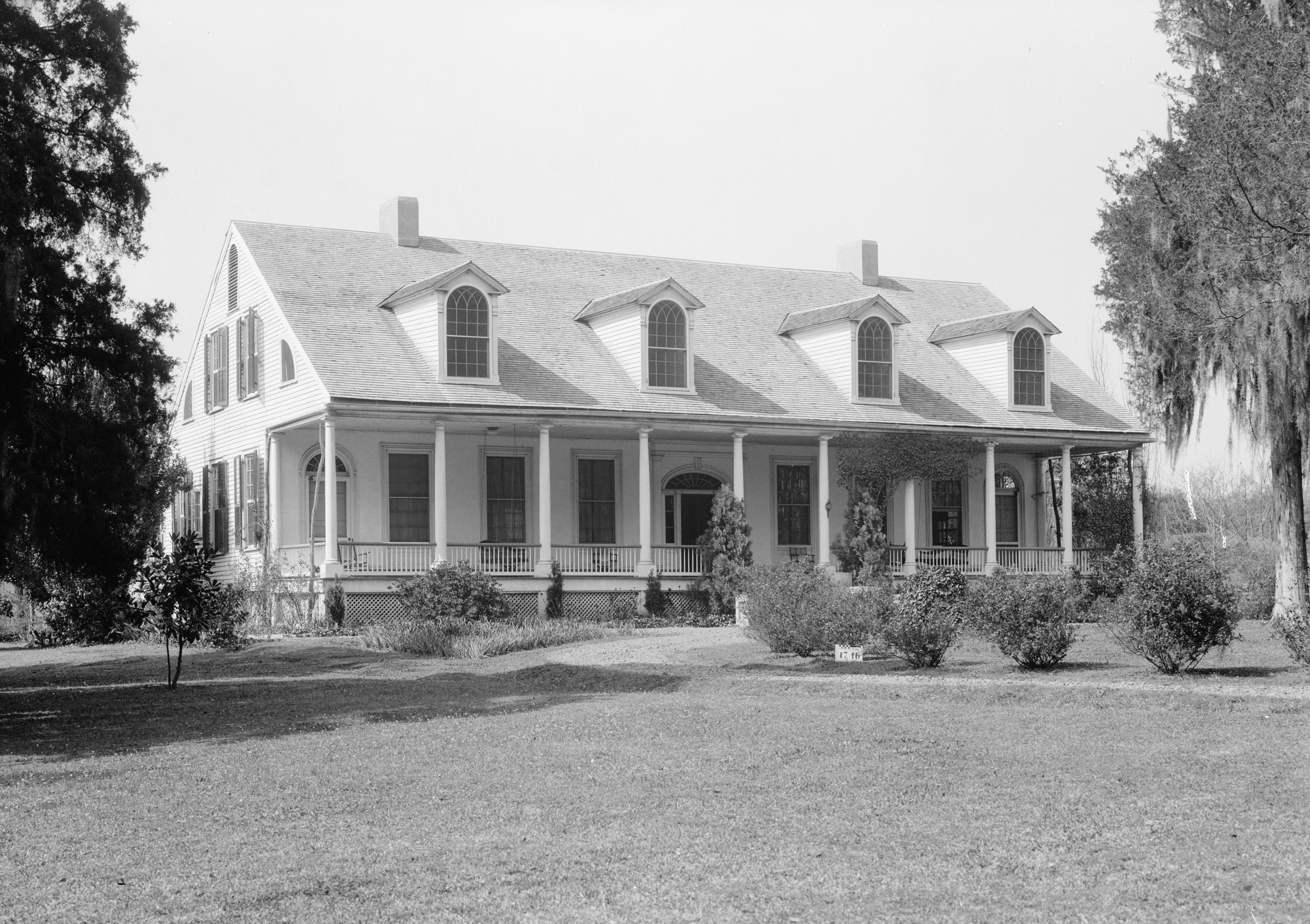
The Briars in Natchez, Mississippi, where Howell and her family lived.

Throughout their marriage, Howell's husband worked as a planter, merchant, politician, cotton broker, banker, postmaster, and military commissary manager, but never secured long-term financial stability. The majority of Howell's sizable dowry and her inheritance were lost through her husband's bad investments and the couple's lavish lifestyle. Howell's husband declared bankruptcy in 1825 and the family home, furnishings, and slaves were seized by creditors to be sold at public auction. Howell and her husband continued to have financial problems throughout their lives and depended on her wealthy relatives for support. Howell and her family took up residence at The Briars, a mansion in Natchez that was leased to them by John Perkins Sr. from 1828 to 1850.

During the American Civil War, Colonel John McGavock and Carrie Elizabeth Winder McGavock of Carnton Plantation sent one of their pregnant house slaves, Mariah Reddick, to stay with Kempe at her house in Montgomery, Alabama.

Following the South's defeat in the war, Howell fled to Canada. She helped care for her elder grandchildren while her son-in-law was imprisoned at Fort Monroe.

== Death and legacy ==
Howell died in Quebec on November 24, 1867. She was buried at Cimetière Mont-Royal in Outremont. Some of her belongings, including an étui and a floral needlework appliqué, are housed in the collection of the American Civil War Museum.

== Works cited ==
- Cashin, Joan (2006). First Lady of the Confederacy: Varina Davis's Civil War, Cambridge, MA: Belknap Press of Harvard University Press
