= Maney-Sidway House =

Historic house in Tennessee, United States

- U.S. National Register of Historic Places
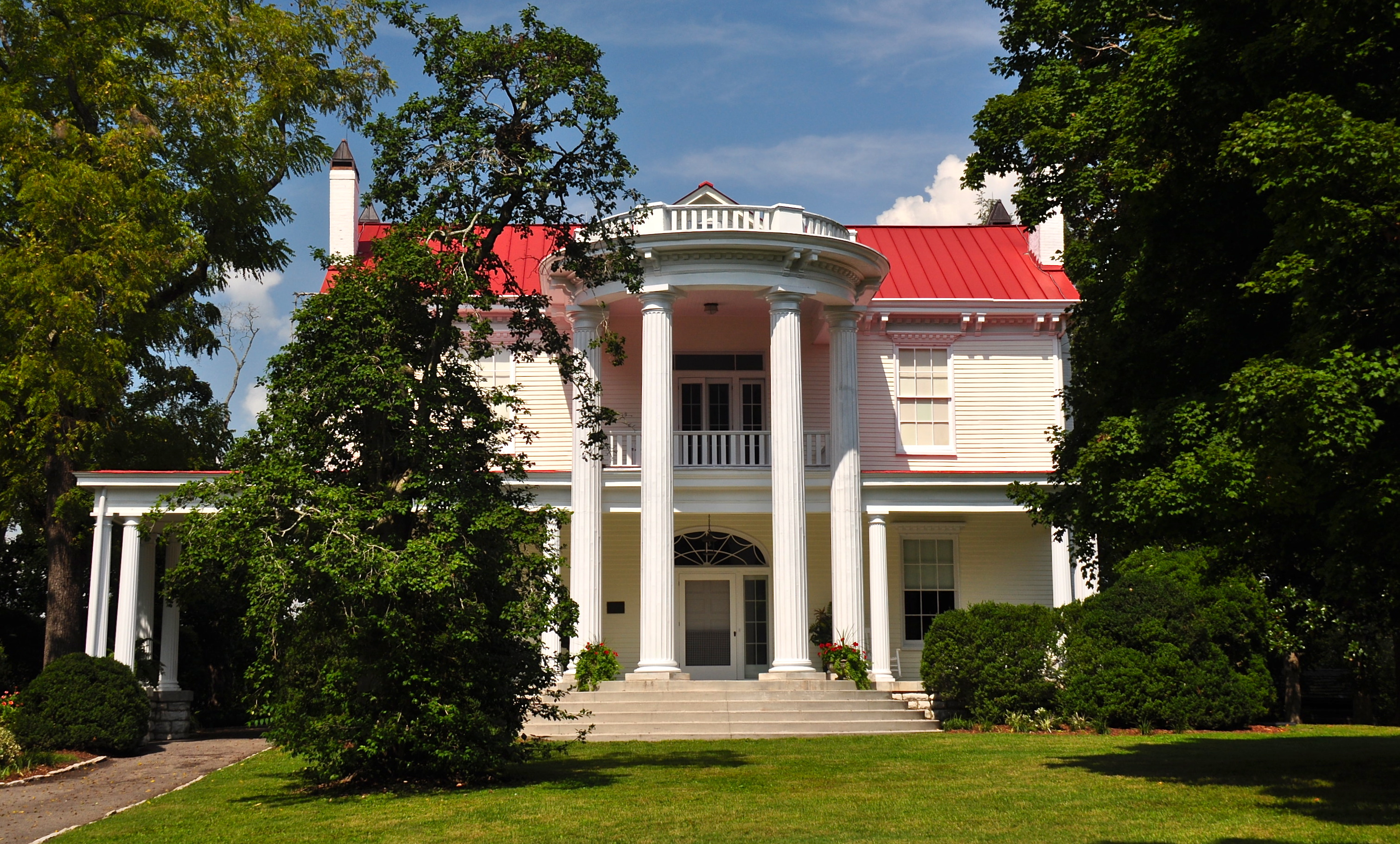
- Maney-Sidway House, September 2014.

- Location within Tennessee Location within the United States
- Location: Myles Manor Ct. W of Franklin Rd./US 31, Franklin, Tennessee
- Coordinates: 35°56′1″N 86°51′58″W
- Area: 11.9 acres (4.8 ha)
- Built: C 1850, 1900 and 1916
- Architect: Field, Marshall
- Architectural style: Classical Revival
- MPS: Williamson County MRA
- NRHP reference No.: 88000333
- Added to NRHP: April 13, 1988

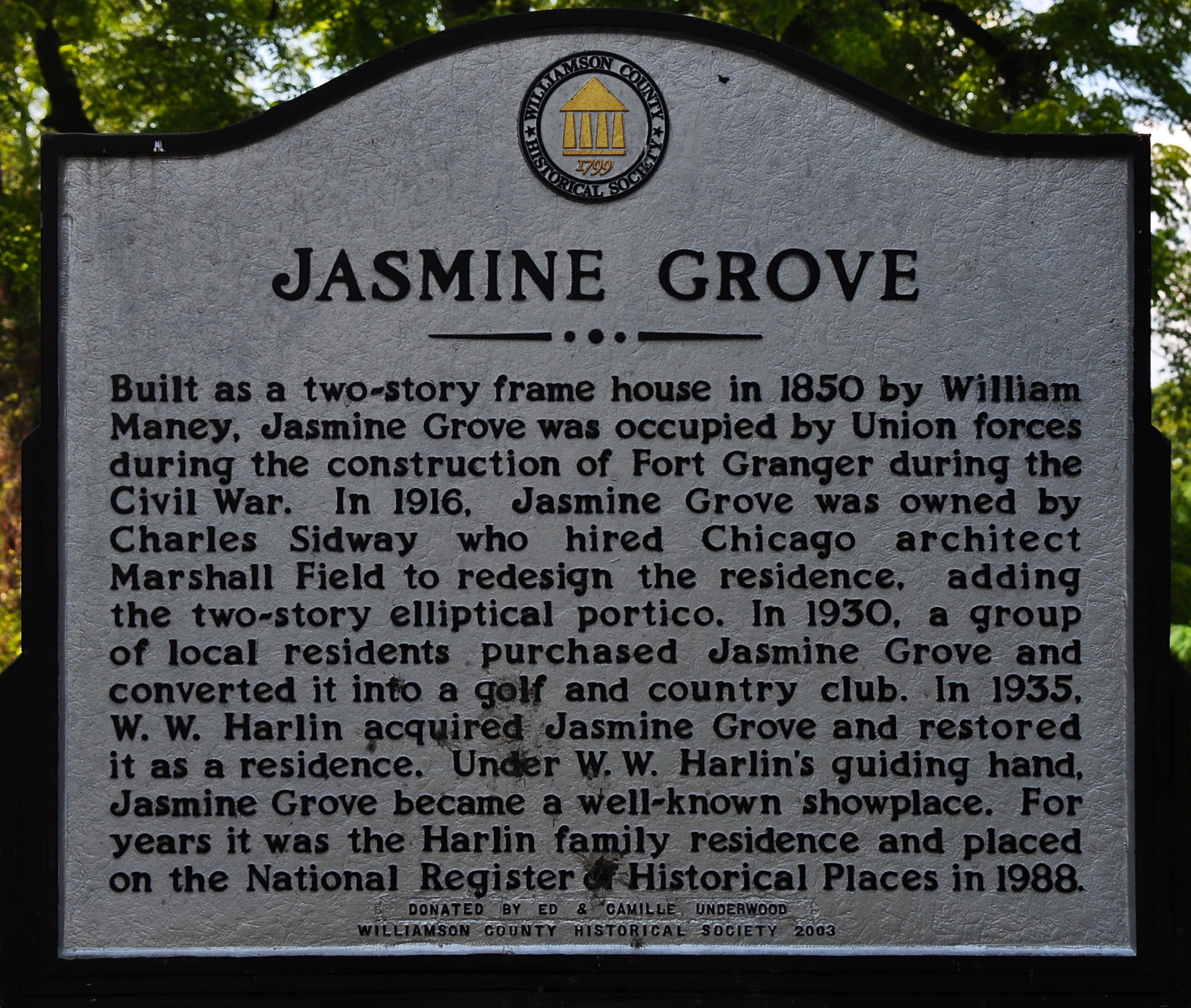
Williamson County Historical Society Sign for Jasmine Grove also known as the Maney-Sidway House.

The Maney-Sidway House, also known as Jasmine Grove and as Myles Manor, is a building in Franklin, Tennessee originally built c.1836, that was listed on the National Register of Historic Places in 1988.

The building served as a hospital for Union wounded following the Battle of Franklin.

It was extensively remodelled in 1916 in Neo-Classical style, including adding an elliptical, two-story portico to the main facade of the building. For the 1916 renovations of the property, it is included in a survey of historic resources of Williamson County as one of only a few notable residential structures in the county that were built during 1900–1935. Henry H. Mayberry House was another, as was a remodelling of the Randal McGavock House, both reflecting Neo-Classical style.

The National Register listing includes 11.9 acres (4.8 ha) with two contributing buildings, one contributing structure, and two non-contributing structures.
