= Henry H. Mayberry House =

Historic house in Tennessee, United States

- U.S. National Register of Historic Places
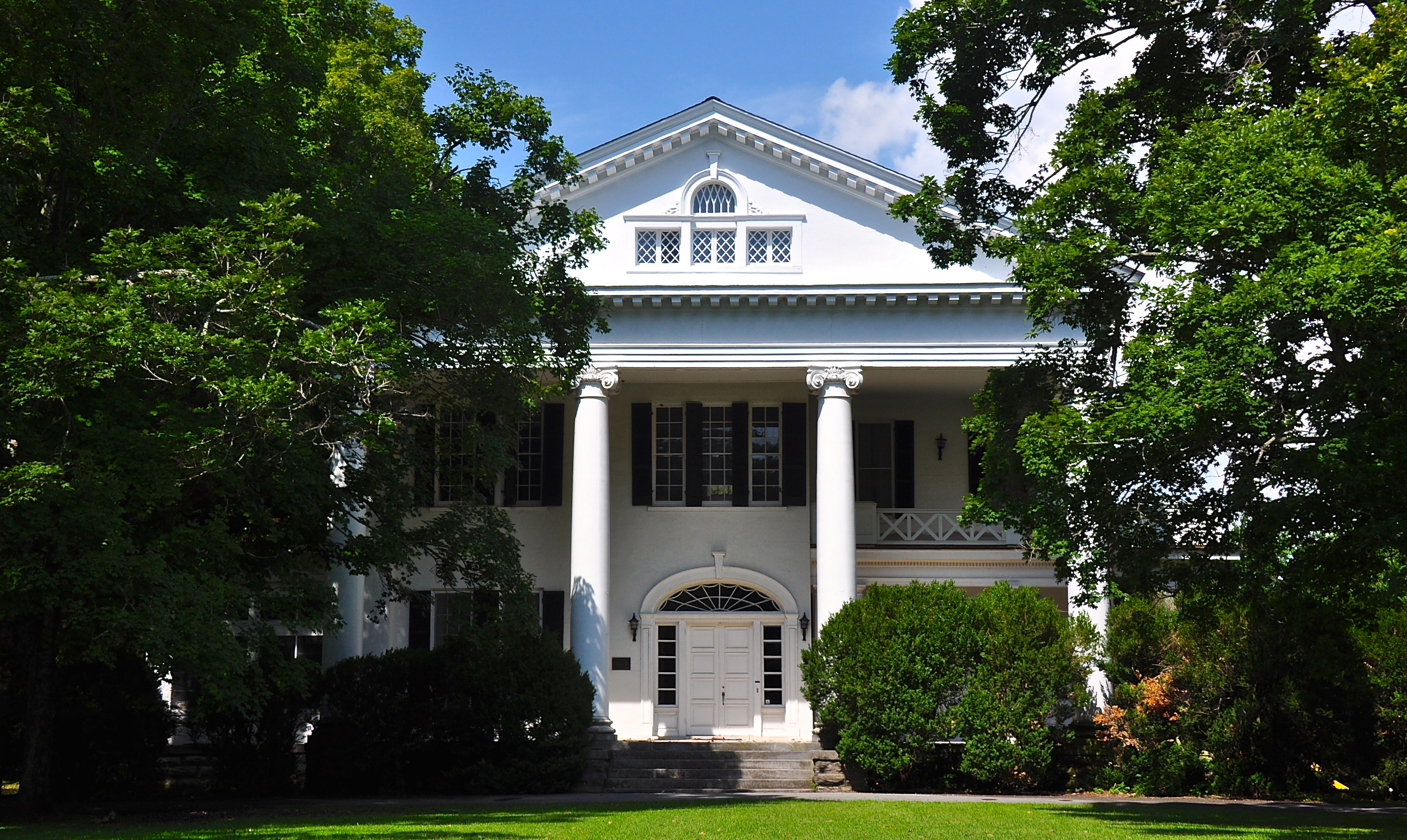
- Henry H. Mayberry House, September 2014.

- Location within Tennessee Location within the United States
- Location: US 31 just across the Harpeth River N of Franklin, Franklin, Tennessee
- Coordinates: 35°55′46″N 86°52′2″W
- Area: 26 acres (11 ha)
- Built: 1902
- Architectural style: Classical Revival
- MPS: Williamson County MRA
- NRHP reference No.: 88000335
- Added to NRHP: April 13, 1988

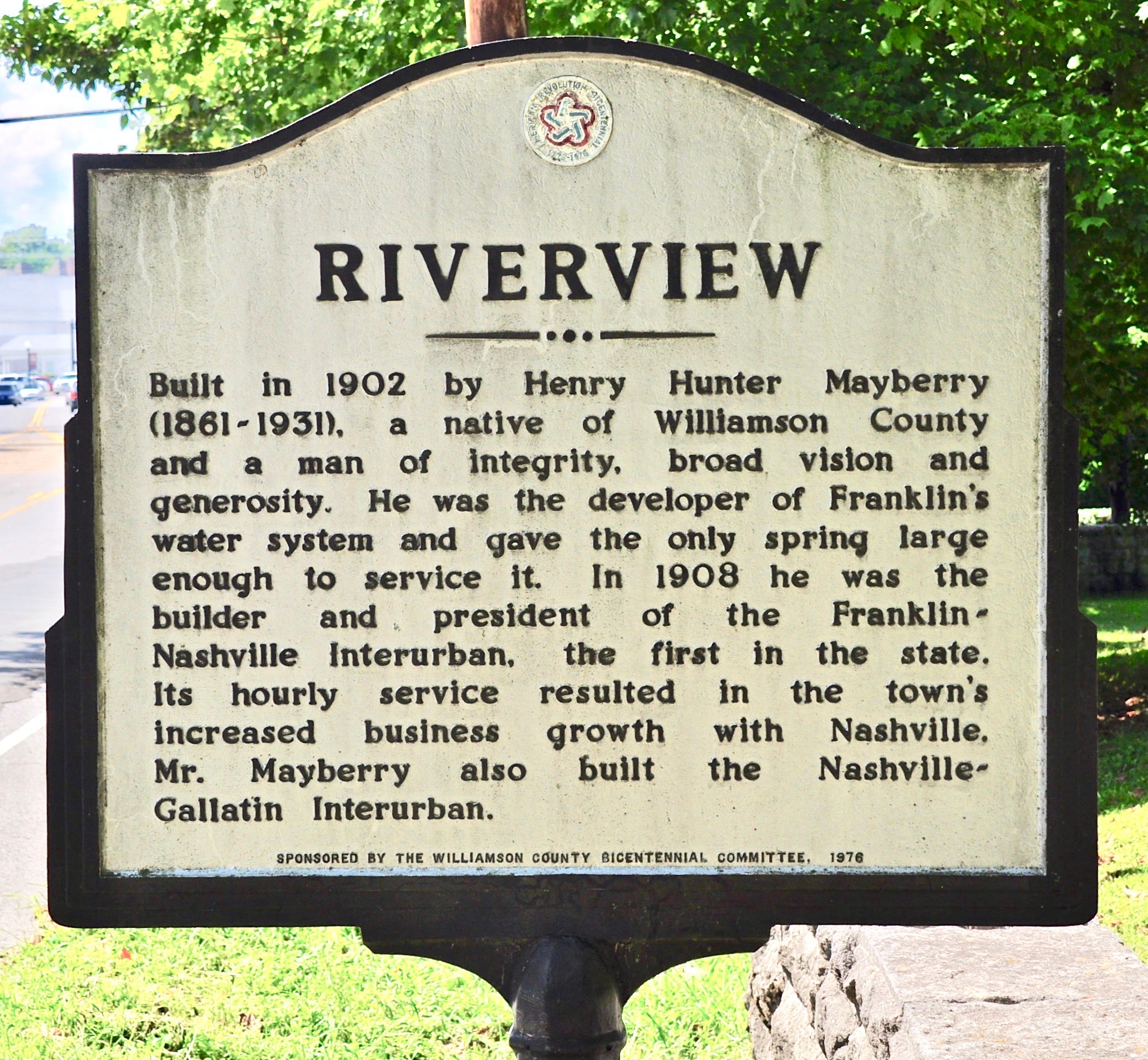
Williamson County Historical Society Marker for Riverview (Henry H. Mayberry House)

The Henry H. Mayberry House, also known as "Riverview", is a private home in Franklin, Tennessee located on Franklin Pike (US 31) just north of the Harpeth River Bridge. Built in 1902 in Neo-Classical or Classical Revival architecture, it is one of the notable residences of the 1900-1935 period in Williamson County. (Note: Others are the Maney-Sidway House and the Randal McGavock House.) At the time it was built it had the most technologically advanced utilities in the county, including electric lights and its own water works. It was listed on the National Register of Historic Places in 1988. When listed, the property included an area of 26 acres (11 ha).

== Henry Mayberry ==
The building of the house in 1902 was envisioned by Henry Hunter Mayberry who was born in Williamson County, Tennessee, Jan 5, 1861. His father was H.G.W. Mayberry and his mother was Lenora Hunter Mayberry, both members of widely connected families. Mayberry, a small man who wore large wire-rimmed glasses, was descended from a Revolutionary War veteran who had originally come from Germany. He grew up in Franklin and was educated at the Campbell School for Boys on West Main Street. After graduating from the University of Tennessee, he settled in Birmingham, Alabama, and amassed a considerable fortune after founding the Mayberry Hardware Company. He served as vice-president of the Alabama National Bank. While in Birmingham, he also helped organize a steel company that demonstrated that steel could be made from local iron ore. He retired in 1904 and moved back to Franklin, Tennessee, where became president and chief fundraiser for the Franklin Interurban Railway, Franklin's first major travel connection to Nashville. It was an electric-powered train running hourly from Franklin's town square to Nashville, a distance of about 20 miles (32 km). Mayberry died on December 27, 1931, at age 71, four days after an automobile accident in which he suffered a fractured hip.

== House details ==
The original property was about 95 acres (38 ha) purchased from C.R. Webb in 1901. Mayberry hired a Birmingham architect to design the house. There was an existing one-story brick house at the site, and the architect decided to incorporate its two front rooms to become the back part of the new house. When built, the Mayberry house was the most modern of any in Williamson County. It was the first home in Franklin to have a waterworks system, with water pumped from a spring by use of a gasoline engine to a storage tank, then to pipes into the house and surrounding outbuildings. There were four tiled bathrooms with tubs, lavatories and commodes. It also had an electric lighting system made by the Dayton Engineering Laboratories Company(Delco). Historian Virginia M. Bowman said there were "lights not only in the house but all outbuildings and on gate posts". Another advanced feature was central heat supplied by a basement furnace, but there were still fireplaces in every room. The third floor was a ballroom.

Mayberry donated another spring on land he owned in Still Hollow (near Leiper's Fork) to supply water to the city of Franklin. The city supplied the pipe and secured the rights of way. In exchange, Mayberry wanted the contract to lay the pipe. By 1906, Mayberry's spring system supplied, completely by gravity, 450,000 US gallons (1,700,000 L; 370,000 imp gal) of water per day to the town. This steady water supply ended Franklin's dependence on groundwater.

== See also ==
- H. G. W. Mayberry House, also NRHP-listed in Williamson County
