= Polmer Store =

- U.S. National Register of Historic Places
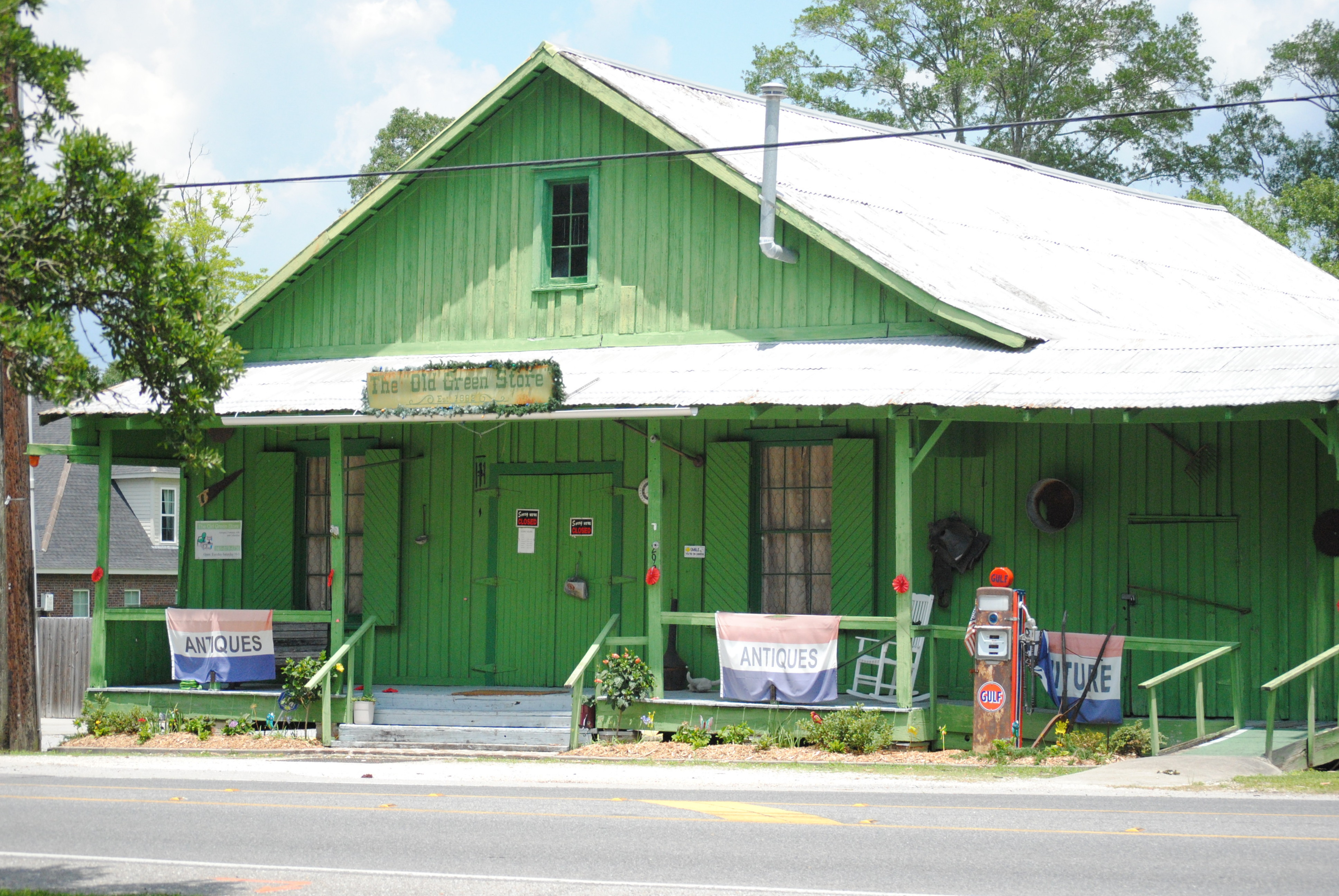
- The store's west facade, seen from Highway 311

- Location within Louisiana Location within the United States
- Nearest city: Schriever, Louisiana
- Coordinates: 29°38′32″N 90°48′50″W
- Area: 1.2 acres (0.49 ha)
- Architectural style: Stick/eastlake
- NRHP reference No.: 96000607
- Added to NRHP: May 30, 1996

The Polmer Store, built c. 1880, is a well-preserved example of the once-common plantation store, a type of company store used after slavery ended. The one-story frame structure in Terrebonne Parish, Louisiana, was added to the National Register of Historic Places in 1996.

== History ==
Samuel and Leon Polmer were two successful leaders within Terrebonne Parish, Louisiana. Before moving to Houma, Louisiana, the Polmer brothers immigrated from Austria to Donaldsonville, Louisiana. There, the Polmer brothers managed a factory that produced heavily leaded glass containers and soda pop. The brothers moved to Houma and purchased the Ducros Plantation from the Woods brothers, R. C. and R.S, in 1909. The Polmer brothers then opened four stores within the 1920s. The Waubun Store, known as the Big Waubun Store, was the first Polmer Store to open. They leased the property and building from the John T. Moore Company and later purchased the small location on the Waubun Plantation from Alfred P. Danzinger in the year 1924. The second store to open was located on the Ducros Plantation, which the Polmer's owned. In the next years to follow the Polmer brothers opened two more stores called the Bull Run Store, located on Bull Run Plantation, and the Central Store, the last Polmer Store standing to this day. The Central Polmer Store was purchased from original owner, Raoul Toups. These stores were convenient after the post-Civil War era to the people and plantations, such as, Ellendale, Ardoyne, Bull Run, and Waubun.

As their businesses grew, the Polmer Brothers created what was called a "rolling stores" to accommodate the community which made it easy for people who had limited transportation. The stores had horse-drawn wagons, later replaced by trucks, with merchandise that would go from house to house to either deliver goods or take orders for the next day. Women could order household items, such as, food, furnishing items, farming equipment, and even material to make clothing and bedding. The "rolling stores" had samples of these materials, which made it easily accessible. The next day the trucks would deliver the previous days order. The orders were placed on tabbed accounts that people would pay periodically.

Plantation workers were paid in scrip as a source of income until the harvesting period was over. In sugar-growing areas like Terrebonne Parish, this was a method of retaining the workforce as plantation owners feared the workers would leave during the harvest and leave plantations in a bind. Scrip was only accepted at plantation stores, such as, the Polmer stores. This allowed the workers to get everyday necessities they needed to live on. "Our first and strongest effort is to serve our patrons- to sell them everything they want to buy and save them money and all the trouble and worry we can." This was an Ad from the Directory of the Parish of Terrebonne. "No matter what you want ask us first. It is our pleasure and business to think for you and work for you. –Polmer Bros."

Leon Polmer was a businessman, so he ran the stores. Samuel Polmer was more of a politician and was known by most as "Uncle Sam". He was a powerful part of Huey P. Long Regime, but both brothers played a major role in the highway that connects Thibodaux to Houma, and also the highway from Schriever to Morgan City, Louisiana.

After World War II, the stores became general stores for the surrounding areas. Most plantation stores rapidly declined, but the Polmer Stores continued with business. The brothers sold the stores in the 1940s, after nearly thirty years. The Central Polmer Store was sold to an employee, Vital Porche. Samuel died in 1940 and eleven years later Leon died, leaving behind his twin sons, Irvin and Mervin Polmer, to continue on the Polmer's legacy. The twins continued caring for the Ducros Plantation and Irvin followed in his Uncle Samuel's footsteps into politics. After the twins died, the Ducros plantation has been owned by Dr. Jacob L. Fischman and later to its most recent owners, the Bourgeois Family, since 1994. The Ducros Store burned down in 1989 and the stores, Bull Run and the Big Waubun, were torn down. The Central Store is the last Polmer Store standing today.

== Architecture ==
The Central Polmer Store is a double door, one-story, rectangular-shaped building. The architecture style is known as vernacular architecture and was accommodated for Louisiana's humid and wet climate. The architecture of the store includes high vaulted ceilings and an open wooden floor plan within the interior. The original shelving was glass, wooden frame cabinets and a large countertop to display the merchandise. A rolling ladder is used to reach the merchandise on the high shelves. On the exterior of the green building there is a large porch in the front and wide white wooden trims that accent the plantation-style building. Big wooden shutters protected the windows from the weather. Gravity gas pumps were added around the 1920s - 1930s. The other Polmer Stores had similar features as the Central Store. The Big Waubun Store also sold fresh refreshments to traveling customers from the railroad tracks.

== Today ==
Today the Central Polmer Store is the only plantation store remaining in Terrebonne Parish. It is an easily recognizable building to locals as the green exterior building sits on Highway 311. It is now known as the Old Green Store and is an antique shop. It still holds the same characteristics as if it still was a plantation store.

== See also ==
- Burdette Plantation Company Store
- Caspiana Plantation Store
- Kong Lung Store
- National Register of Historic Places listings in Terrebonne Parish, Louisiana
