= Carrie Winder McGavock =

American slave owner and cemetery caretaker

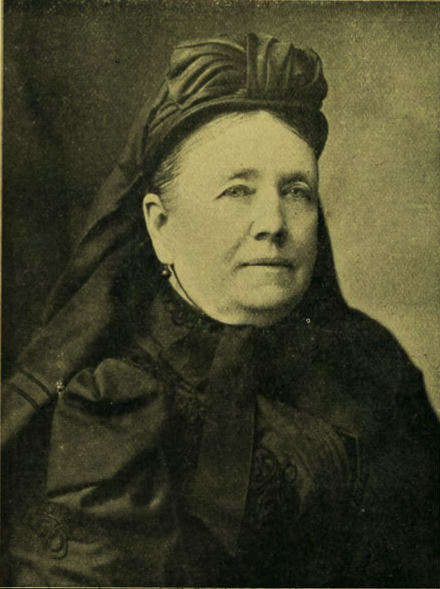
- Portrait photo of McGavock (Confederate Veteran, 1905)
- Born: Caroline Elizabeth Winder; September 9, 1829; Adams County, Mississippi, U.S.
- Died: February 22, 1905 (aged 75); Williamson County, Tennessee, U.S.
- Resting place: Carnton
- Occupations: cemetery caretaker wartime nurse
- Spouse: John McGavock (1848–1893; his death)
- Children: 5
- Parent(s): Van Perkins Winder (father); Martha Grundy (mother)
- Relatives: Felix Grundy (grandfather)

Caroline "Carrie" Winder McGavock (née Winder; September 9, 1829 – February 22, 1905) was an American and the caretaker of the McGavock Confederate Cemetery at Carnton, a historic plantation complex in Franklin, Tennessee. Her life was the subject of a 2005 best-selling novel by Robert Hicks, entitled The Widow of the South.

== Early life and education ==
Caroline (nickname "Carrie") Elizabeth Winder was born near Natchez, Mississippi, September 9, 1829 to Martha Grundy Winder and Colonel Van Perkins Winder. Her mother was a daughter of the Hon. Felix Grundy, thirteenth United States Attorney General. As an infant, she removed with her parents to Ducros Plantation, their plantation in Louisiana, west of New Orleans, where she was brought up. McGavock enjoyed the advantages of wealth and a high social position.

She received her education training through the Presbyterian Church.

== Career ==
On December 6, 1848, she married Col. John McGavock, son of Randal McGavock, of Franklin, Tennessee, and came to his home, Carnton, where she spent the remainder of her life, nearly sixty years. Five children were born to them: Martha (b. 1849), Mary (b. 1851), John (b. 1854), Harriet ("Hattie") (b. 1855), and Winder (b. 1857), with only two surviving to adulthood, a son, Winder McGavock (1857–1907), and a daughter, "Hattie", who married George Cowan.

Mariah Reddick was held as a slave by Carrie's parents, Colonel Van Perkins Winder and Martha Grundy Winder of Ducros Plantation in Schriever, Louisiana. In December 1848, Reddick was given to Carrie as a wedding present, working for her as a personal house slave at Carnton and at St. Bridget, the McGavock's sugar plantation in Louisiana. Reddick worked for four generations of the McGavock family at Carnton as a nurse, maid, midwife, and head of the household staff. In 1853, Van Winder gave Carrie four additional slaves.

McGavock Confederate Cemetery with Carnton in the background

It was around Carnton that the Battle of Franklin was fought on November 30, 1864. The home became filled with the wounded, to whom Col. McGavock and his wife ministered with all their resources. Mrs. McGavock was expected to take on the responsibilities of a nurse, assisting with the wounded soldiers. She led the efforts, supervising the logistics, and ordering her enslaved African-Americans to assist. She donated food, clothing, and supplies to care for the wounded and dying. Carrie's two surviving children, Hattie (age nine) and Winder (age seven), served as medical aides throughout the evening as well. On the morning after the battle, five Confederate generals lay dead on the wide gallery of the house. For weeks, the McGavocks nursed the wounded, cared for the dying, and buried the dead.

When the war was over, Col. McGavock gave part of the ground of Carnton for the McGavock Confederate Cemetery, in which were gathered the bodies of the Confederate Army soldiers who died on that field. The care of this cemetery became Mrs. McGavock's duty. She managed the maintenance of the cemetery with former African-American slaves until her death in 1905. She preserved the inscriptions recorded on the grave markers in her Cemetery Record Book.

== Personal life ==
She was an active member of Franklin's Presbyterian Church for 59 years.

In addition to her own children, McGavock brought up thirteen orphan children in her home.

== Death and legacy ==
Caroline McGavock was in failing health the last eighteen months of her life. She died at the home of her daughter, Mrs. George L. Cowan, on the Lewisburg Pike, near Franklin, Tennessee, on February 22, 1905, age 76. She was buried in the family burying ground at Carnton, near the graves of the Confederate dead.

McGavock's life was the subject of The Widow of the South, a 2005 novel by Robert Hicks.

== Selected works ==
- Cemetery Record Book
