= Franklin Interurban Railway =

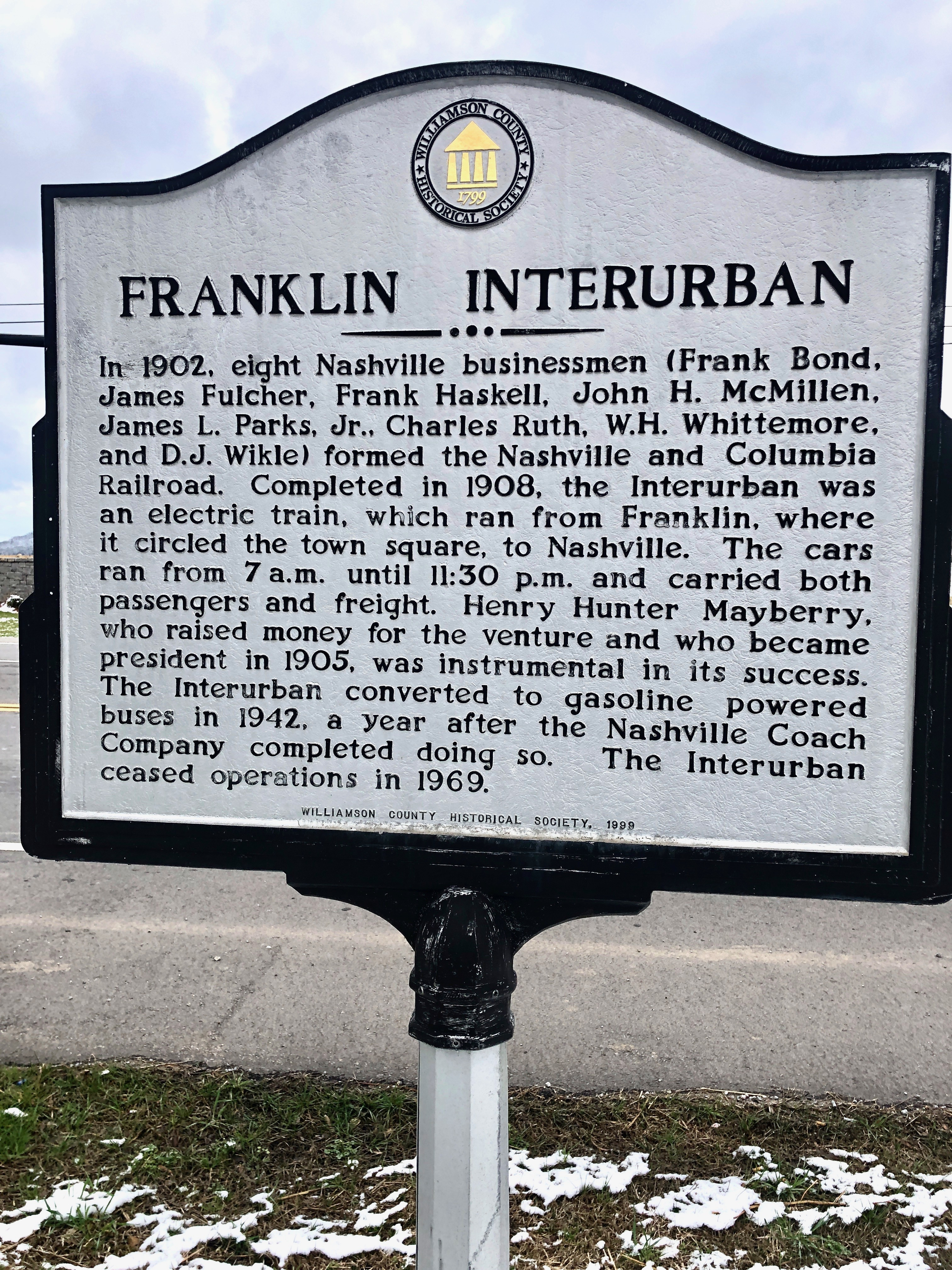
Franklin Interurban Historical Marker

The Franklin Interurban Railway, also known as the Nashville Interurban, was an electric interurban rail line that existed in central Tennessee between 1908 and 1942. It ran between Franklin, Tennessee and Nashville, a distance of 19 miles (31 km), and was Franklin's first major travel connection to Nashville. During this period in the United States, most cities already had or were developing streetcars. The next logical step was to use electric rail for longer runs to connect nearby cities. Interurban railways like the Franklin line capitalized on the advantages of electric rail technology over steam locomotives; for example, no smoke or cinders on passengers; electric trains could move both forward and in reverse, allowing for quicker turnaround times; furthermore, they used the American standard gauge track, enabling the interchange of existing rail cars if needed. These innovations bridged the gap between urban streetcars and long-distance rail services. Travelers' only other options in that era were steam locomotives which were ill-suited for frequent stops; or unpaved roads which were often rough, muddy, or dusty.

The train left hourly from 7 a.m. to 11:30 p.m. carrying passengers and freight between the two cities. There were 20 stations listed on line, but there were no official stops. Passengers could flag down the train at any point to board. Boarded passengers could pull a brake cord to be let off anywhere along the line.

The rail line was in operation until 1942 when the route was changed over from rail to gasoline powered buses on highways. The interurban buses were discontinued in 1969.

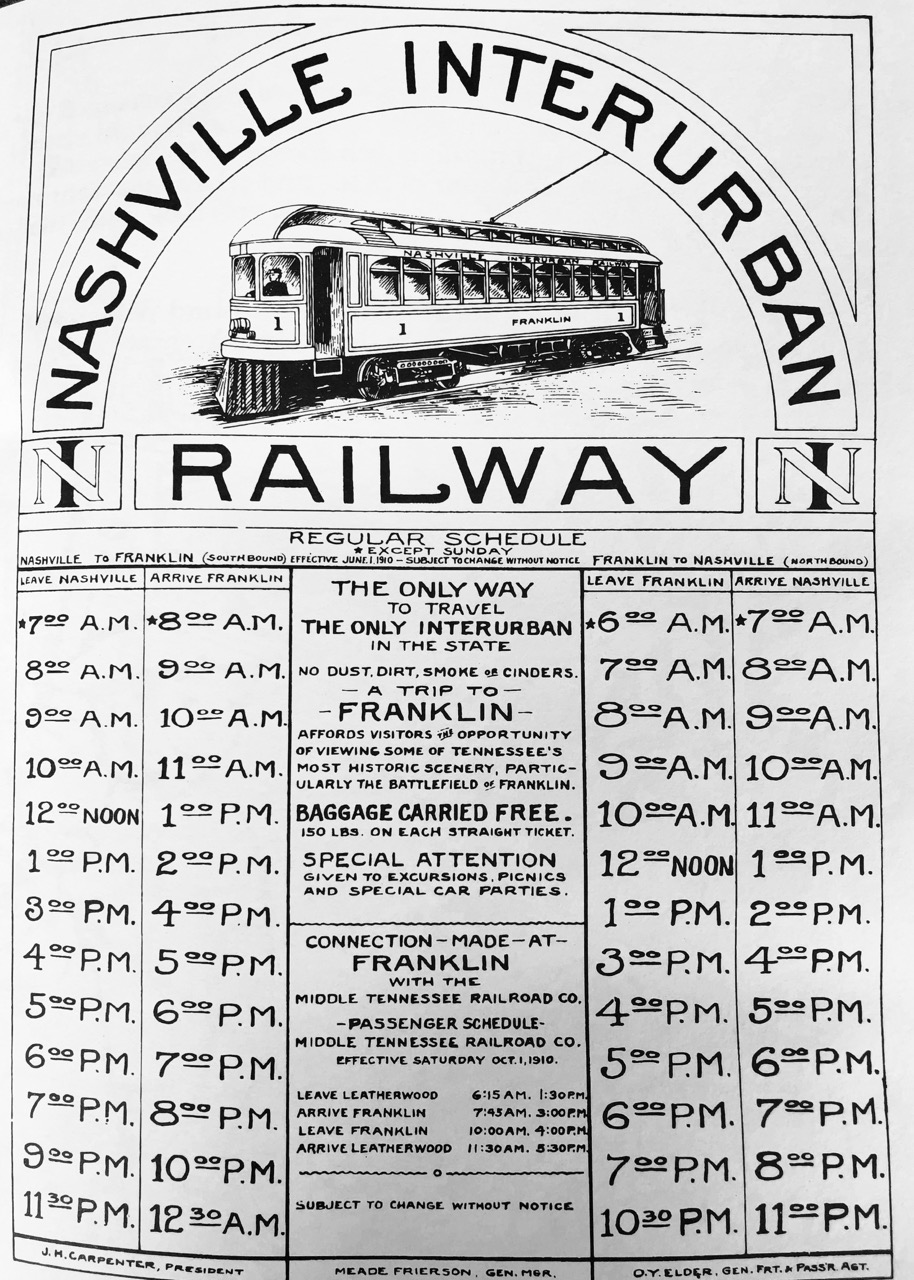
Nashville–Franklin, Tennessee interurban railway schedule, June 1, 1910

== Development ==
The Franklin project began with eight investors in 1902 who met to discuss the idea of an interurban railway. Not much progress was made until Henry H. Mayberry, a Franklin native, moved back to town after making his fortune in the hardware business in Birmingham, Alabama, where he was also vice-president of the Alabama National Bank. When he retired in 1902, he moved back to Franklin and became interested in the interurban railway. He was named president of the interurban project and facilitated financing from the Carnegie Trust Company of New York. When that bank failed, local investors raised the capital themselves. In May, 1907, investors met at the Henry H. Mayberry house to lift a spade of dirt to commemorate the occasion.

== Route ==
As the train's inaugural run from Nashville pulled into Franklin's town square a huge crown had gathered and a band played "Dixie". The train cars were overflowing. It was an immediate success. On the return trip, the route leaving Franklin went out 3rd Avenue, then north on Bridge Street to cross the Harpeth River; it went around the Harlinsdale Farm and generally followed Franklin Pike (US 31) to Nashville.

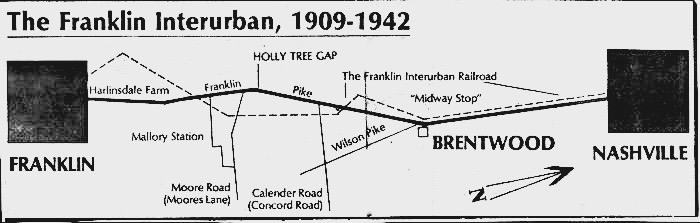
Source: Franklin, Tennessee, Archives & Museum

In order to follow the most level path, it crossed Franklin Pike twice before reaching Nashville: the first was near Mallory Station Road, where, as of 2020, the Vanderbilt Legends club stands. (the spot of the marker pictured above). Subsequent stops were Moore's Lane, the Tennessee Baptist Children's Home, Ashlawn, Murray Lane and Kirkman (today's Franklin Road Academy). It crossed Moore's Lane, then crossed back across Franklin Pike near what is now Concord Road. The Hayesland Station still stands. The power station to furnish electricity for the train was near the intersection of Franklin Road and Old Hickory Boulevard. The Nashville terminus was at Bransford Avenue and 8th Avenue South. At this point, passengers could connect with the Nashville Railway and Light Company, the existing Nashville streetcar line.

== Legacy ==
The railroad carried about 30,000 passengers per month until the 1920s when the main road (Franklin Pike) between the two towns was paved. Rail ridership then diminished, but the interurban was still profitable. Its demise was foreshadowed by Nashville's decision in 1941 to close its trolley system, the Nashville Railway & Light Co., depriving the interurban of its route to downtown. In 1942 the route was changed over from rail to gasoline powered buses on highways. The interurban bus service was discontinued in 1969.
