= William Brown Cooper =

American painter

- Born: 1811; Smith County, Tennessee
- Died: 1900 (aged 88–89); Chattanooga, Tennessee
- Education: National Academy Museum and School
- Occupation: Painter
- Relatives: Washington Bogart Cooper (brother)

William Brown Cooper (1811–1900) was an American portrait painter from the state of Tennessee.

== Early life ==
William Brown Cooper was born in 1811 near Carthage in Smith County, Tennessee. His brother was the painter Washington Bogart Cooper (1802–1888). He was educated at the National Academy Museum and School in New York City as well as in Paris and Rome for three years.

== Career ==
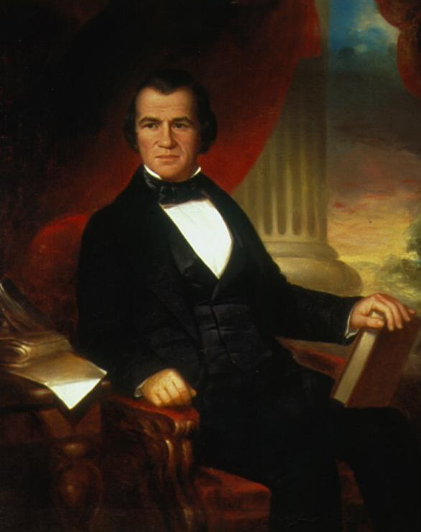
Attribution: William Brown Cooper, Sitter: Andrew Johnson, Date: 1856

Back in the United States, he started his career as a painter, and was active in Washington, D.C., St. Louis, Chicago, New Orleans, Little Rock, Arkansas, Natchez, Mississippi and Tennessee. In 1853, he painted a painting entitled Out of State. He had a studio in Memphis, Tennessee for fifteen years. He later moved to Nashville, followed by Chattanooga in 1885.

Cooper often signed his paintings the same way as his brother did, and he had a similar style, thus making it hard to know who painted which painting. However, one clue to distinguish their paintings is that he painted more portraits of children, and was more opulent in his choice of colors and painting material.

In about 1885 he moved to Chattanooga, Tennessee, with his son, Prof. John L. Cooper. They founded the Chattanooga School for Young Ladies, where William B. Cooper was in charge of the art department at the time of his death.

His portrait, painted by Johannes Adam Simon Oertel (1823–1909), is owned by Sewanee: The University of the South in Sewanee, Tennessee.

== Death ==
Cooper died on May 2, 1900, in Chattanooga, Tennessee. He was struck by an electric streetcar while crossing the street and attempting to dodge an automobile. "He was a very hale and hearty man at the time of his death," according to a death notice.
