= Caspiana Plantation Store =

Historic building, former plantation store

- U.S. National Register of Historic Places
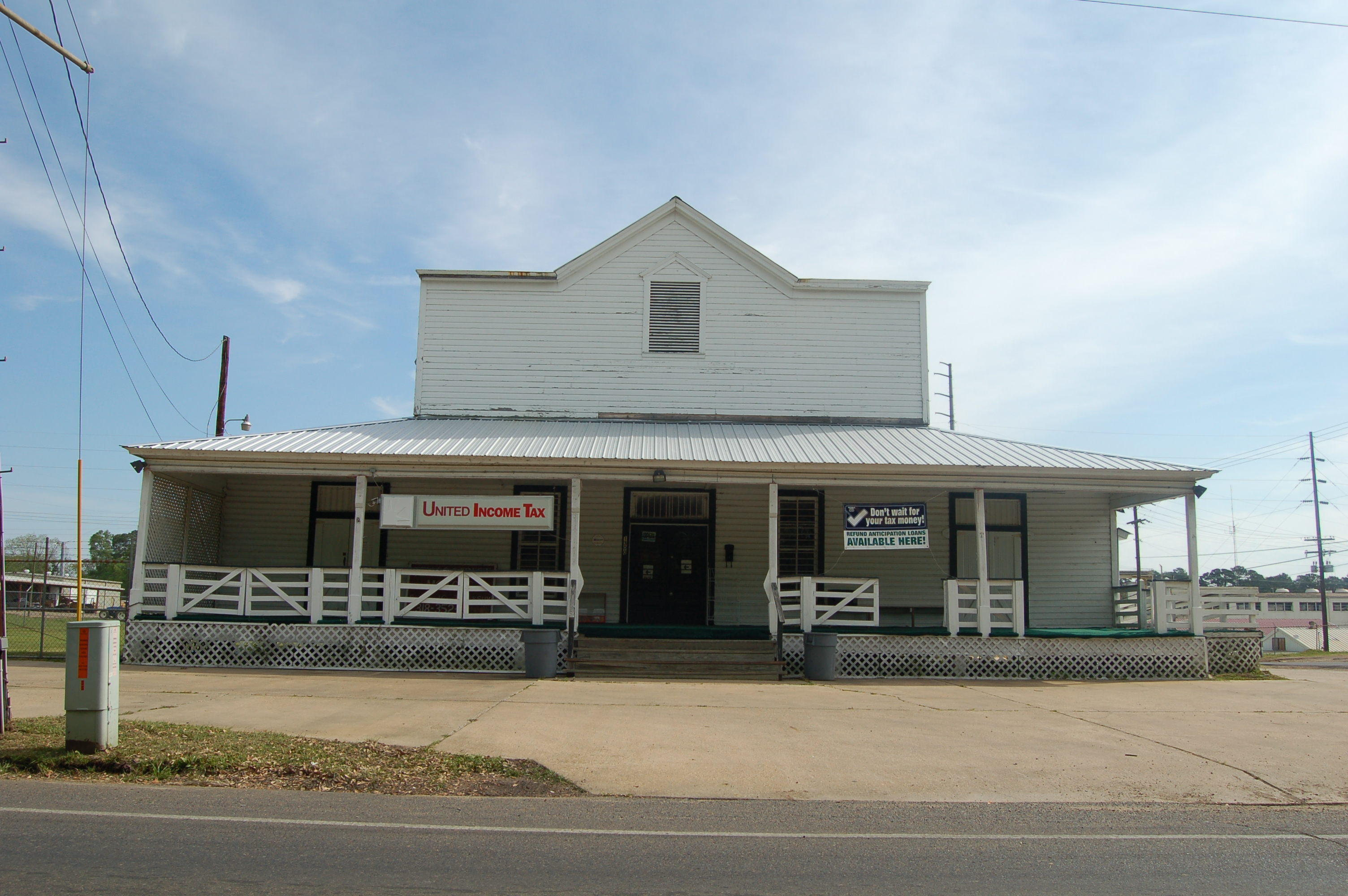

- Location within Louisiana
- Location: 1300 Texas Street, Natchitoches, Natchitoches Parish, Louisiana, U.S.
- Coordinates: 31.770278°N 93.096389°W
- Built: 1906
- NRHP reference No.: 92000583
- Added to NRHP: June 5, 1992

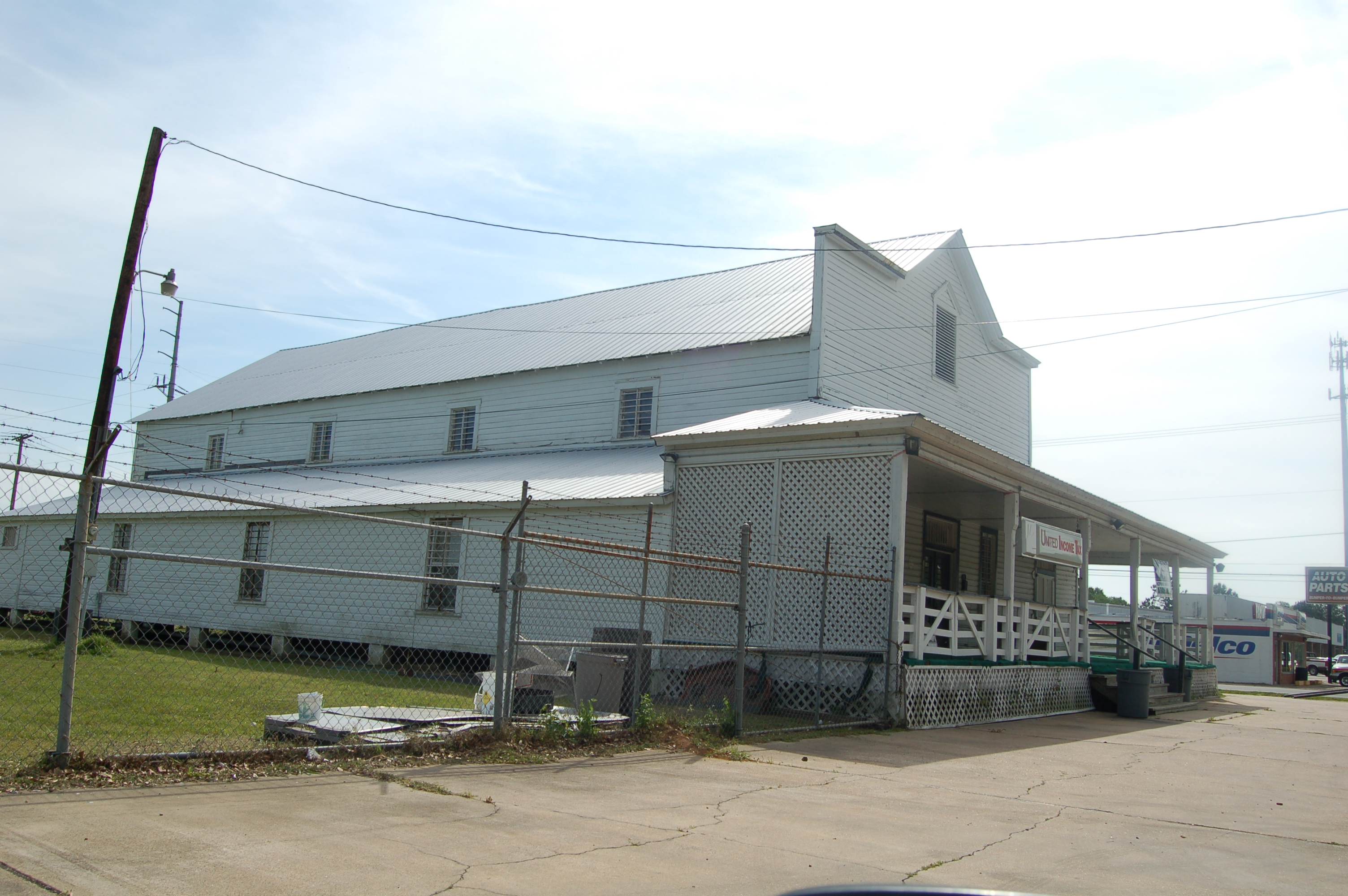
Caspiana Plantation Store side view

Caspiana Plantation Store is an American historic building and a former plantation store built in 1906, located at 1300 Texas Street in Natchitoches, Louisiana. The store served as part of the crop-lien system, during the time of sharecropping which impacted the lives of many African American workers.

It is listed as a National Register of Historic Places since June 5, 1992 for its agricultural history and significance.

== History ==
The Caspiana Plantation Store was part of the Caspiana Plantation, a Reconstruction-era cotton plantation built by William Joseph Hutchinson (1839–1913) and originally located in the unincorporated community of Caspiana in Caddo Parish, Louisiana. The main house at the Caspiana Plantation is named Caspiana House, and is now part of the Pioneer Heritage Center at Louisiana State University Shreveport.

The Caspiana Plantation Store allowed local sharecrop farmers to purchase seeds and equipment by using their future crop as collateral, which often trapped people in debt. This store was most active from 1906 until 1942. At one time there were hundreds of these plantation stores in the state, primarily found on the grounds of large plantations.

In 1991, the plantation store was moved to the city of Natchitoches after the sale of the property. The process of moving the building required it to be cut in half however despite the changes, it maintained much of its original features and is a rare example of plantation store architecture and history.

== See also ==
- Burdette Plantation Company Store
- Kong Lung Store
- Polmer Store
- National Register of Historic Places listings in Caddo Parish, Louisiana, includes the relocated house
- National Register of Historic Places listings in Natchitoches Parish, Louisiana
