= John Perkins Jr. =

American politician (1819–1885)

Member of the U.S. House of Representatives from Louisiana's 3rd district
- In office March 4, 1853 – March 3, 1855
- Preceded by: Alexander G. Penn
- Succeeded by: Thomas G. Davidson

Personal details
- Born: July 1, 1819 Adams County, Mississippi
- Died: November 28, 1885 (aged 66) Baltimore, Maryland
- Resting place: Natchez City Cemetery, Natchez, Mississippi
- Party: Democratic
- Spouse: Evelyn Perkins
- Parents: John Perkins Sr.; Mary Perkins
- Education: Yale College; Harvard University
- Occupation: Politician, planter, lawyer

John Perkins Jr. (July 1, 1819 – November 28, 1885) was an American politician who served as a U.S. representative from Louisiana.

== Biography ==
Perkins was born on July 1, 1819, in Adams County, Mississippi, to John and Mary (née Rives) Perkins. He received his early education from private tutors. He graduated from Yale College in 1840 and was initiated, his senior year, into the Skull and Bones Society. He then graduated from the law department of Harvard University in 1842. He was admitted to the bar in 1843 and commenced practice in New Orleans. He also engaged in cotton planting. He was appointed judge of the circuit court for the district comprising Tensas and Madison Parishes in 1851. He was elected as a Democrat to the Thirty-third Congress (March 4, 1853 – March 3, 1855). He was not a candidate for renomination in 1854. He served as chairman of the state secession convention in 1861. He served in the Confederate States Congress from 1862 to 1865. Following the American Civil War, he traveled extensively in Mexico and Europe. He returned to the United States in 1878 and spent the remaining years of his life in Louisiana and Canada. On November 28, 1885, he died in Baltimore, Maryland, and was interred in the Natchez City Cemetery.

== See also ==
- List of United States representatives from Louisiana

U.S. House of Representatives
Preceded by Alexander G. Penn	Member of the U.S. House of Representatives from Louisiana's 3rd congressional district 1853-1855	Succeeded by Thomas G. Davidson
