= Three States Lumber Company Mill Powerhouse =

- U.S. National Register of Historic Places
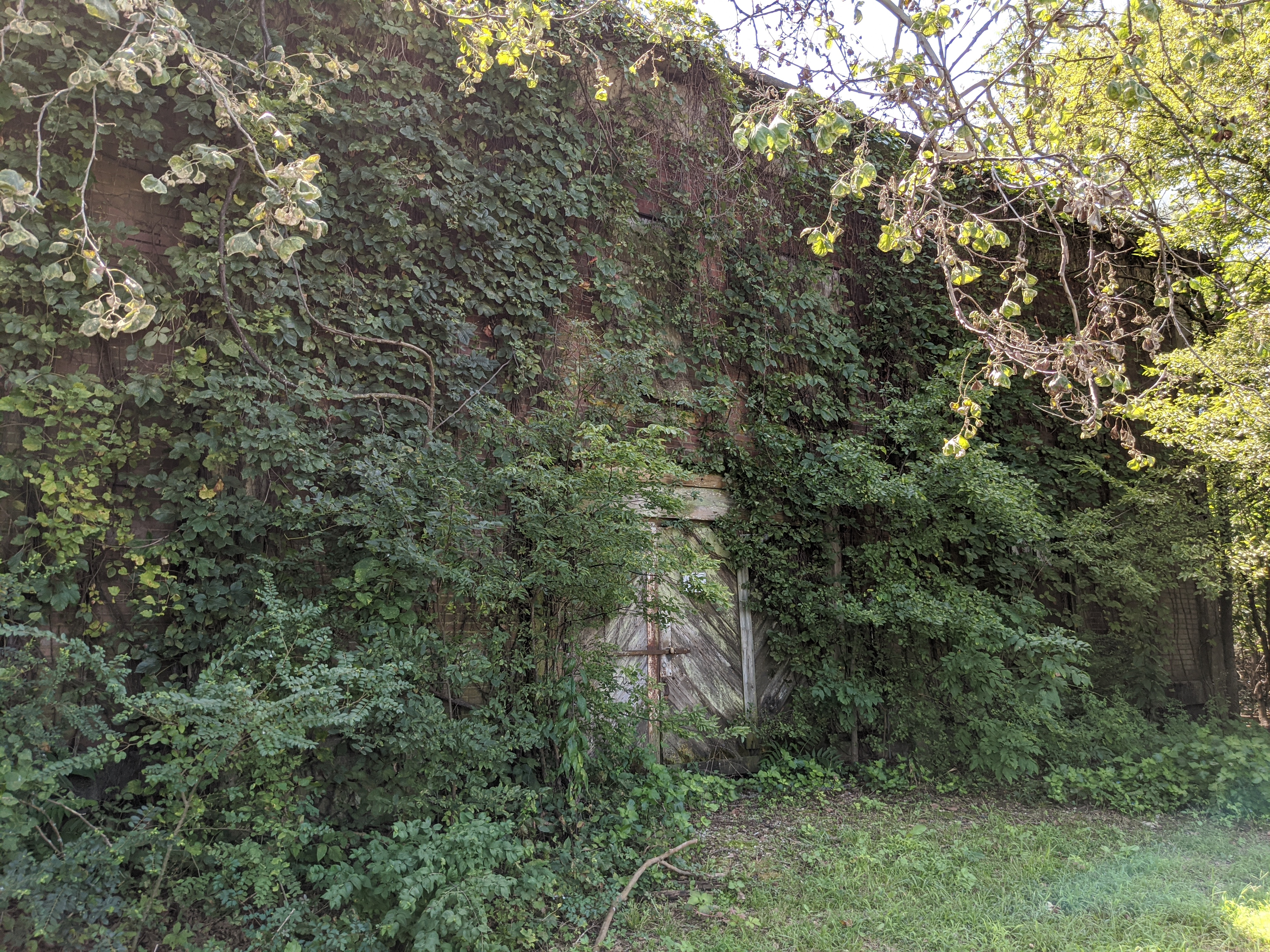

- Location within Arkansas Location within the United States
- Location: Old Mill Rd. Burdette, Arkansas
- Coordinates: 35°49′0″N 89°56′24″W
- Area: 2.8 acres (1.1 ha)
- Built: 1909
- Built by: Three States Lumber Company
- Architectural style: Early Commercial
- NRHP reference No.: 01001175
- Added to NRHP: October 28, 2001

The Three States Lumber Company Mill Powerhouse, also known as the Burdette Plantation Company Store, is a historic industrial site on Old Mill Road in Burdette, Arkansas. The only surviving element of what was once a much larger sawmill, the powerhouse is a two-part structure built in 1909 to provide electrical power to the Three States Lumber Company. The northern part of the building is a two-story brick structure with a gable roof, while the southern part is a single-story shed-roof concrete structure, which includes the remnants of a smokestack. The Three States Lumber Company ran a large sawmill on this site between 1906 and 1922, removing most of the structures when its operations shut down. The property was converted into a plantation when the company moved out, and this building became the company store.

The site was listed on the National Register of Historic Places in 2001.

== See also ==
- Caspiana Plantation Store
- Kong Lung Store
- Polmer Store
- National Register of Historic Places listings in Mississippi County, Arkansas
