= The Briars (Natchez, Mississippi) =

Historic house in Mississippi, United States

- U.S. National Register of Historic Places
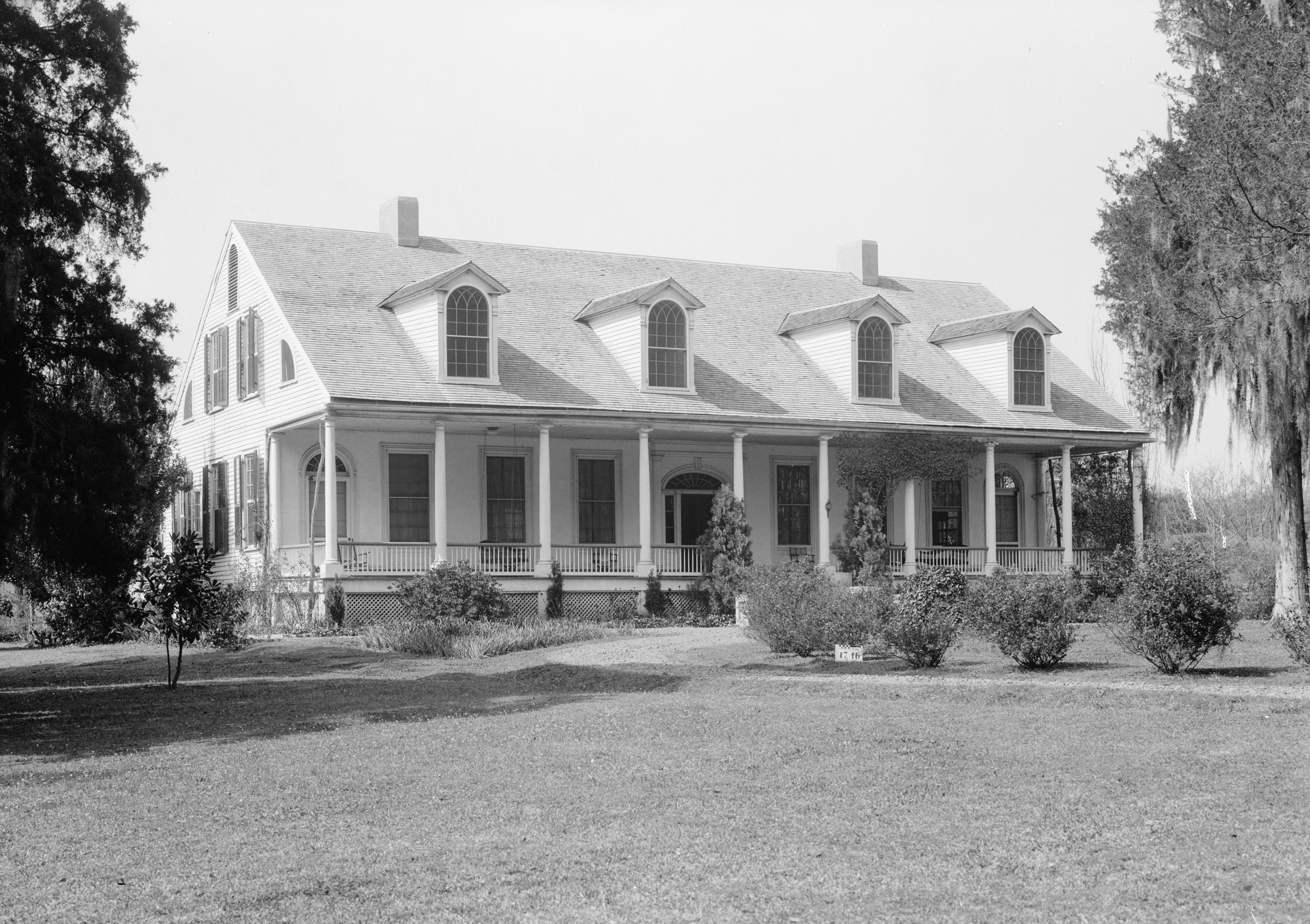

- Location within Mississippi Location within the United States
- Nearest city: Natchez, Mississippi
- Area: 17.7 acres (7.2 ha)
- Built: 1818
- NRHP reference No.: 77000778
- Added to NRHP: August 24, 1977

The Briars is a historic house in Natchez, Mississippi, USA. It was built in 1818 for a large planter. Varina Davis, the First Lady of the Confederate States of America, spent her adolescence in the house. It is listed on the National Register of Historic Places.

== History ==
The land was granted by Spain to Richard Bacon in 1784; it was purchased by Arthur Mahan in 1814.

The house was built in 1818 for Judge John Perkins, a large planter. It was designed by architect Levi Weeks. When his wife died in 1824, Perkins tried to sell the house, but he rented it to William Burr Howell, the son of New Jersey Governor Richard Howell, and Margaret Kempe Howell from 1828 to 1850 instead. Howell's daughter, Varina Howell, grew up at the house. She married Jefferson Davis at the Briars on February 26, 1845, later becoming the First Lady of the Confederacy.

The house was purchased by Walter Irvine in 1853, whose heirs sold it to Emma Augusta Wall in 1927. By the 1970s, it belonged to Robert E. Canon and Newton Wilds. It was subsequently repurposed as a bed and breakfast.

in January 2023 The Briars was sold to Chip and Clara Newman of Flora Ms., and will be fully restored for tours and special events

== Heritage significance ==
The house has been listed on the National Register of Historic Places since August 24, 1977.
