= Toussaint L'Ouverture County Cemetery =

Historic cemetery in Tennessee, United States

- U.S. National Register of Historic Places
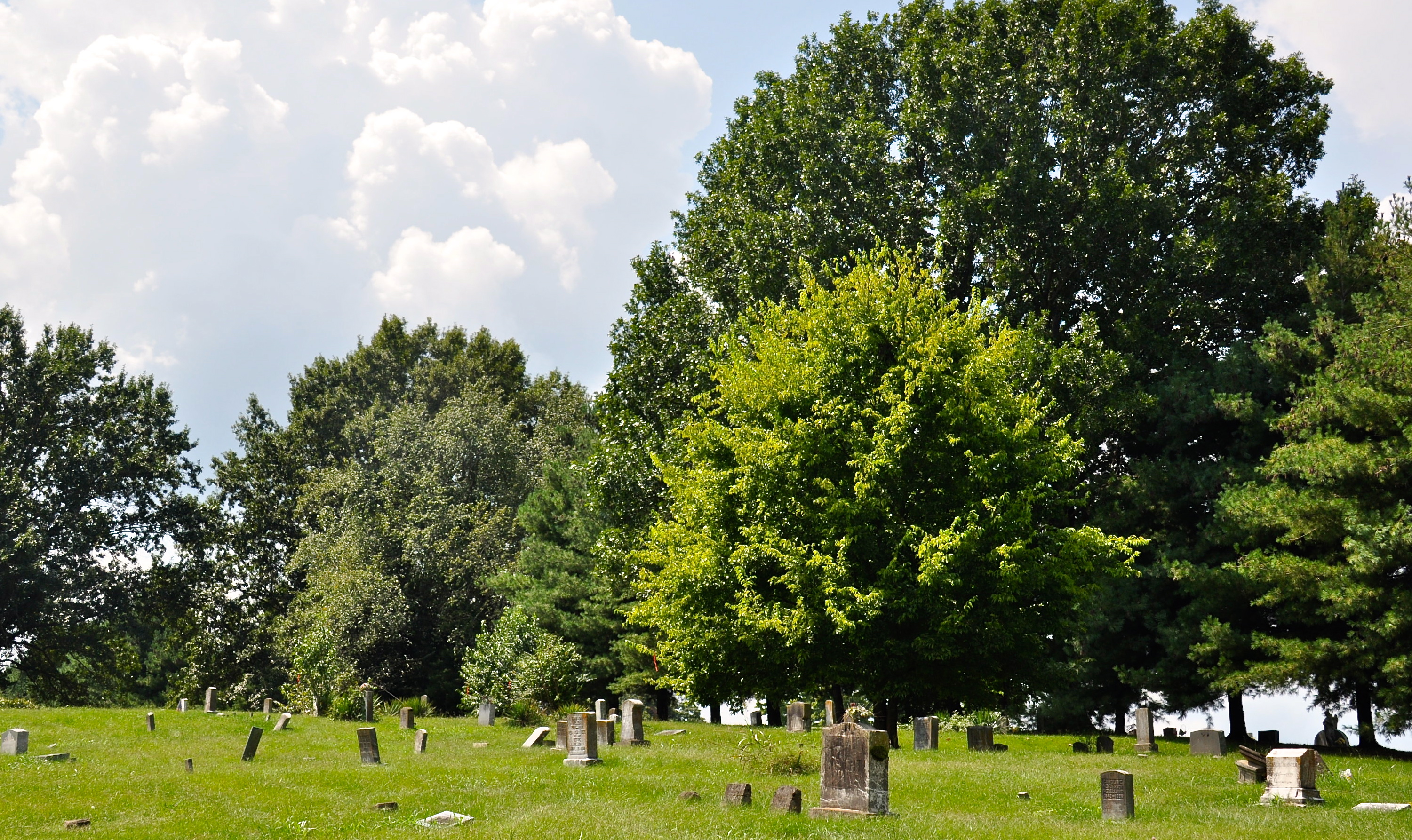
- Toussaint L'Ouverture County Cemetery, September 2014.

- Location within Tennessee Location within the United States
- Location: Del Rio Pike at jct. with Hillsboro Rd., Franklin, Tennessee
- Coordinates: 35°55′50″N 86°52′37″W
- Area: 4 acres (1.6 ha)
- Built: 1869 and 1884
- NRHP reference No.: 95001435
- Added to NRHP: December 13, 1995

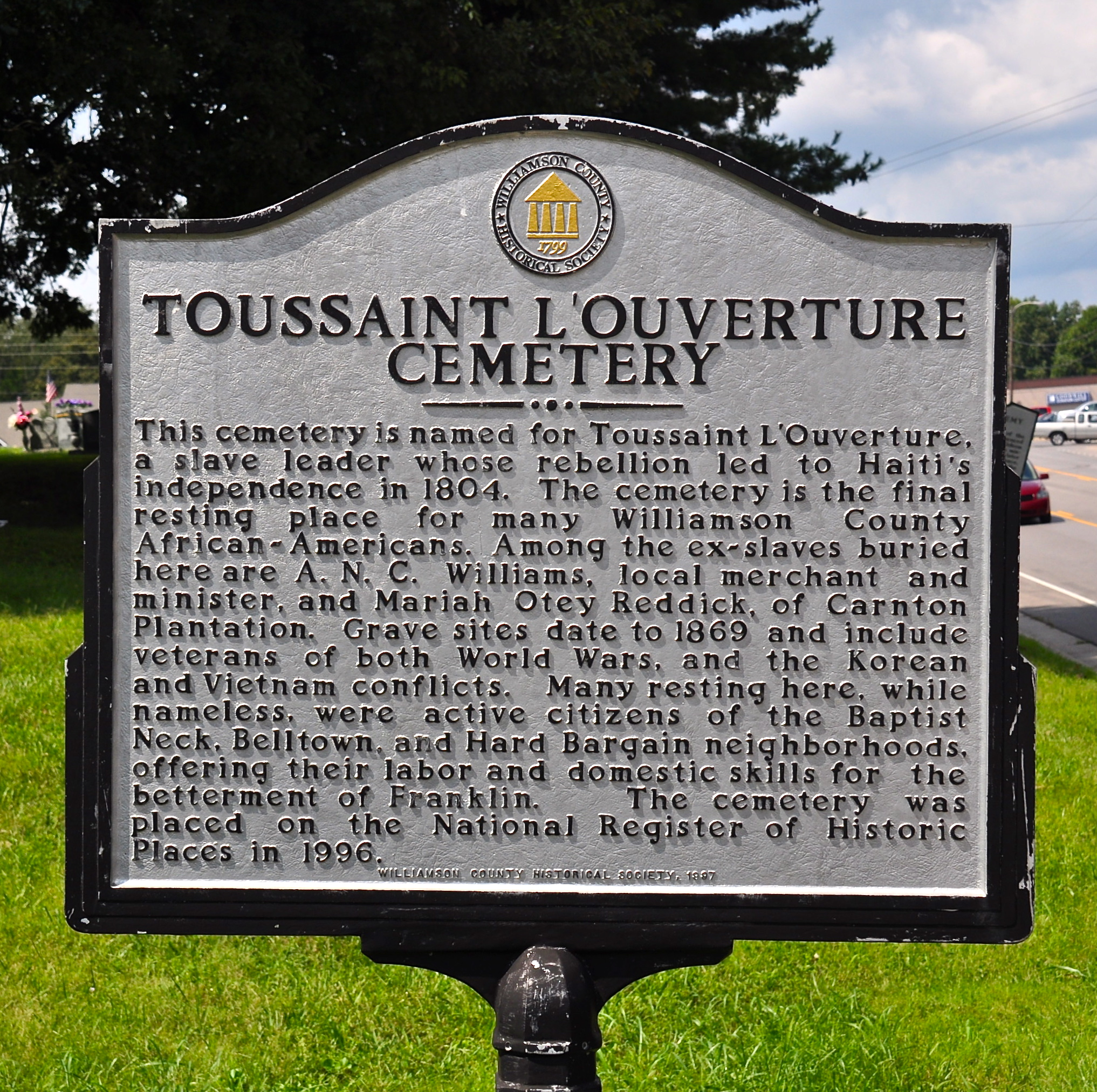
Williamson County Historical Marker for Toussaint L'Ouverture County Cemetery

The Toussaint L'Ouverture County Cemetery is an historical African-American cemetery located in Franklin, Tennessee. It was listed on the National Register of Historic Places in 1995. It is named for Toussaint Louverture, the leader of the Haitian Revolution. The earliest recorded burials date from 1869, but it wasn't officially incorporated until 1884. It is "the oldest African American institution in continuous use" in Williamson County.

The cemetery corporation which originally purchased the land and established the cemetery failed during the Great Depression in the United States. After the failure of the cemetery corporation, no entity was named successor and all the members of the original board of trustees have died. Consequently, ownership of the cemetery is unclear and no entity is legally responsible for its maintenance.

Care of the cemetery has been support by the Toussaint L'Ouverture Cemetery Club hosted by the Toussaint Louverture Org. located in Franklin, TN. The club is a volunteer organization funded by donations and was headed by Mattie B. Reeves. Starting in 2013, when the cemetery was added to the Historic Franklin Parks Cell Phone Tour, community support for the cemetery has expanded. On September 11, 2014, in cooperation with the United Way's Days of Caring program, about 150 community volunteers, many from the local Church of Jesus Christ of Latter Day Saints, cleaned the grounds of the cemetery and headstones. On October 24, 2015, the Cemetery Club held another clean-up day.

== Notable burials ==
- Mariah Reddick (1832–1922), slave and midwife
