= Kong Lung Store =

- U.S. National Register of Historic Places
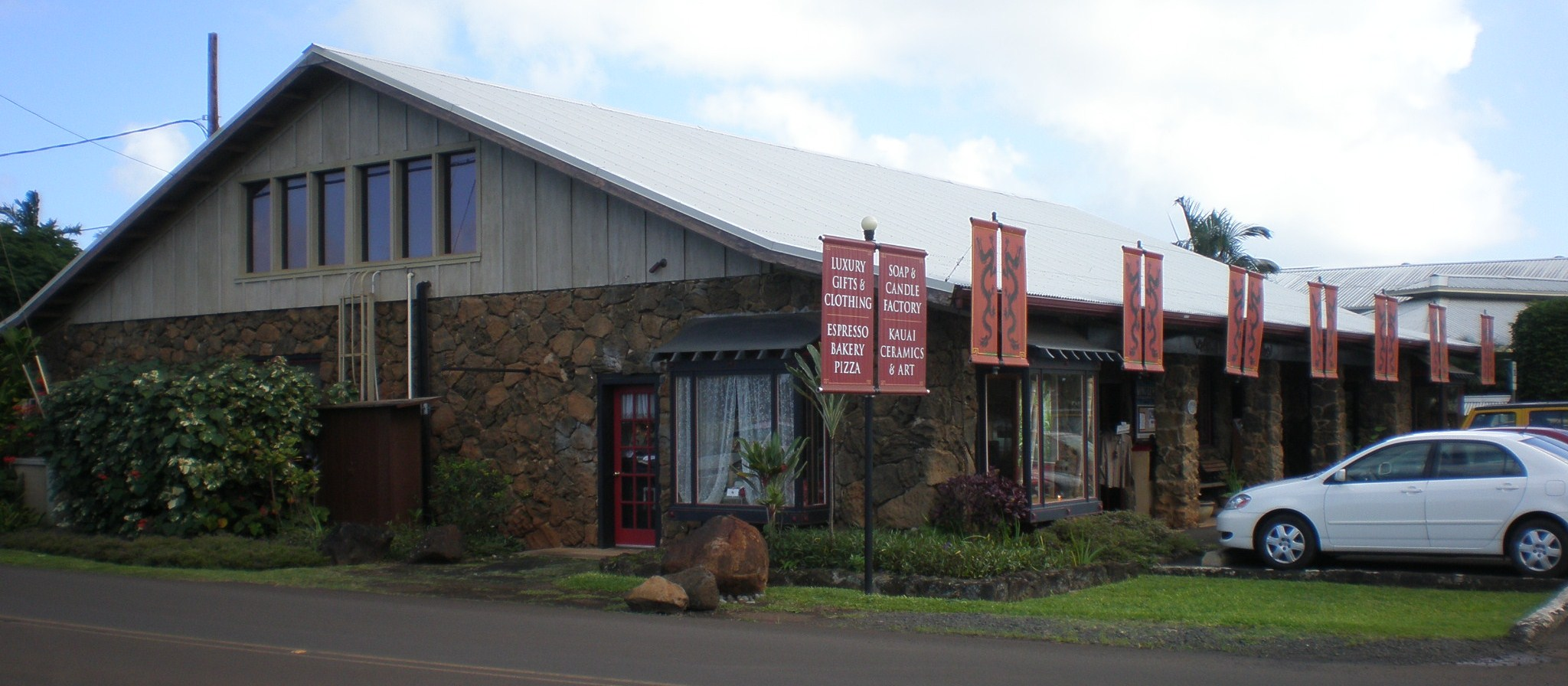

- Location within Hawaii
- Location: 2484 Keneke Street, on Kilauea Lighthouse Rd., half-mile north of Hawaii Route 56, Kilauea, Hawaii
- Coordinates: 22°12′55″N 159°24′35″W
- Area: less than one acre
- Built: c. 1941
- Built by: Allen, Ray M.
- MPS: Kilauea Plantation Stone Buildings MPS
- NRHP reference No.: 93000776
- Added to NRHP: August 5, 1993

The Kong Lung Store, in Kilauea, Hawaii was originally built, in c. 1941, to be the Kilauea Plantation store. It was listed on the National Register of Historic Places in 1993.

It is a 117-by-67-foot (36 m × 20 m) building, the last stone building built by the Kilauea Sugar Company, built of field stone up to its lower gable level, that was a replacement for a previous wood building.

It is deemed significant as an example of masonry construction in Kilauea, usually used for domestic architecture, here adapted for a commercial building. And it is significant for association with the sugarcane plantation and the provision of goods to its workers as a plantation store. The store was managed independently from the plantation, by Chew Lung, son of Lung Wan Chee (b. 1860) who managed the first, predecessor store. It was originally open from 2am to 5am, operated by workers who then went to work in the plantation fields.

== See also ==
- Burdette Plantation Company Store
- Caspiana Plantation Store
- Polmer Store
- National Register of Historic Places in Kauai County, Hawaii
