= Caspiana, Louisiana =

Caspiana
- Unincorporated community
- Location of Caspiana in Louisiana
- Coordinates: 32°17′21″N 93°33′23″W
- Country: United States
- State: Louisiana
- Parish: Caddo
- Elevation: 151 ft (46 m)
- Time zone: UTC-6 (CST)
  - Summer (DST): UTC-5 (CDT)
- Postal code: 71115 (Shreveport)
- Area code: 318
- GNIS feature ID: 541066

Caspiana is an unincorporated community in Caddo Parish. It is located on La-1 with the Prairie River to the east and the Red River to the west.

== History ==
The town of Caspiana was once home to the Caspiana Plantation built by William Joseph Hutchinson (1839–1913). Parts of the former plantation have been relocated and are listed on the National Register of Historic Places, including the Caspiana House in Shreveport, and Caspiana Plantation Store in Natchitoches.
