= Randal William McGavock =

American politician (1826–1863)

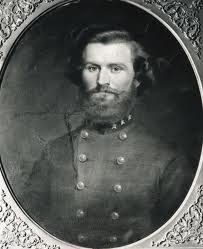
- McGavock c. 1863–1864

Mayor of Nashville, Tennessee
- In office 1858–1859

Personal details
- Born: August 10, 1826 Nashville, Tennessee
- Died: May 12, 1863 (aged 36) Raymond, Mississippi
- Resting place: Mount Olivet Cemetery
- Party: Democratic
- Spouse: Seraphina Deery
- Relatives: Randal McGavock (paternal great uncle); Felix Grundy (maternal grandfather)
- Education: University of Nashville; Harvard Law School
- Occupation: Politician; Planter

Military service
- Allegiance: Confederate States of America
- Branch/service: Confederate States Army
- Years of service: 1861–1863
- Rank: Colonel
- Battles/wars: American Civil War; Battle of Fort Donelson (POW); Battle of Raymond †

Randal William McGavock (1826–1863) was an American lawyer, Democratic politician, Southern planter, and colonel in the Confederate States Army. He served as the mayor of Nashville, Tennessee, from 1858 to 1859.

== Early life ==
Randal William McGavock was born on August 10, 1826, in Nashville, Tennessee. He was a fourth-generation Scotch-Irish-American. His paternal grandfather's brother was Randal McGavock, who served as Mayor of Nashville from 1824 to 1825 and owned the Carnton plantation. His father, Jacob McGavock, fought in the Creek War of 1813–1814 with Andrew Jackson. His mother was Louisa Caroline (Grundy) McGavock. His maternal grandfather was Felix Grundy (1775–1840), U.S. Congressman from Tennessee from 1829 to 1838 and 13th United States Attorney General from 1838 to 1840.

McGavock attended a private academy, The Classical and Mathematical Seminary run by Professor Moses Stevens (1790–1841) in Nashville, which closed down in 1846. From 1843 to 1846, he attended the University of Nashville. In 1847, he enrolled at the Harvard Law School, where he was active in the debating club called Kent Club and the Moot court. He received his law degree from the Harvard Law School in 1849. He then went on a twenty-month tour of Europe, Asia and Africa. He wrote articles about his experiences abroad for the Daily Nashville Union and published them in a book in 1854.

== Career ==
Upon his return from Europe, McGavock worked as a lawyer in Nashville. He joined the A.O.M.C., a fraternal organization whose members wore black robes and hoods during ceremonies. He also oversaw his family plantations in Arkansas, Tennessee, and Kentucky. His portrait was painted by Washington Bogart Cooper (1802–1888) c. 1850.

McGavock was active in the Tennessee Democratic Party. For example, he canvassed for James Buchanan in the 1856 campaign. He served as Mayor of Nashville from 1858 to 1859. He had won the election thanks to the Irish vote. In 1860, he campaigned for John C. Breckinridge. He was a strong proponent of states's rights.

Prior to the American Civil War of 1861–1865, McGavock established a militia in Tennessee among the Irish. Meanwhile, his wife founded the Ladies Soldiers' Friend Society, a patriotic group that included Sarah Childress Polk, the widow of President James Polk.

During the war, he organized, outfitted, and served as lieutenant colonel of the 10th Tennessee Infantry ("Sons of Erin") in the Confederate States Army. In 1862, he succeeded to command of the 10th Tennessee at Fort Donelson when its colonel, Adolphus Heiman, was given command of a brigade. He was captured in the ensuing siege and imprisoned in Fort Warren on Georges Island in Massachusetts for five months. He was paroled in September 1862 and re-elected lieutenant colonel when the regiment was exchanged and reorganized. Upon Heiman's death from illness in November, McGavock became colonel of the 10th Tennessee and was killed in action leading a counter-attack at the Battle of Raymond in Mississippi on May 12, 1863.

== Personal life ==
McGavock married Seraphina Deery in 1855.

== Death and legacy ==
After he was killed in combat on May 12, 1863, McGavock was first buried in Raymond, but his sister Ann and her husband, Judge Henry Dickinson made arrangements for the body to be brought to their home in Columbus, Mississippi. Finally, on St. Patrick's Day, 1866, he was buried in Mount Olivet Cemetery in Nashville during a ceremony conducted by the Masons.

McGavock's portrait, done by Washington Bogart Cooper, hangs in the Nashville Public Library.

== Bibliography ==
=== Primary source ===
- Randal William McGavock, A Tennessean Abroad (1854).

=== Secondary source ===
- Jack Allen, The Diary of Randal William McGavock, 1852–1862: An Interpretation of a Period (Nashville, Tennessee: George Peabody College for Teachers, 1941).

Political offices
Preceded by John A. McEwen	Mayor of Nashville, Tennessee; 1858–1859	Succeeded by Samuel N. Hollingsworth
