= Van Perkins Winder =

American sugar planter (1809–1854)

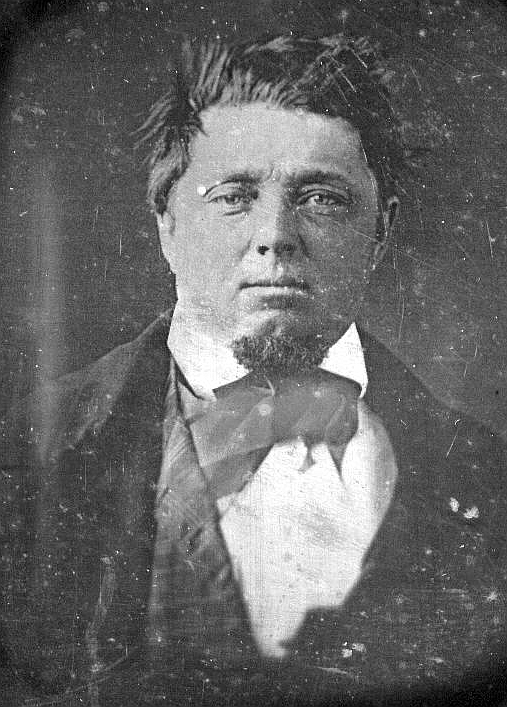
- Born: June 3, 1809; Natchez, Adams County, Mississippi
- Died: November 8, 1854 (aged 45); Schriever, Terrebonne Parish, Louisiana
- Cause of death: yellow fever
- Resting place: Nashville City Cemetery
- Occupation: Planter
- Spouse: Martha Grundy
- Children: Carrie Winder McGavock
- Parent(s): Thomas Jones Winder; Harriet Handy
- Relatives: Felix Grundy (father-in-law)

Colonel Van Perkins Winder (1809 – 1854) was an American sugar planter in the Antebellum South.

== Early life ==
Van Perkins Winder was born on June 3, 1809, in Natchez, Mississippi. His father was Dr Thomas Jones Winder (1772–1818) and his mother, Harriet Handy (1786–1820). He was a descendant of Colonel Nathaniel Littleton (1605–1654).

== Career ==
Winder acquired the Ducros Plantation in the Terrebonne Parish, Louisiana in 1845. That same year, he purchased slaves from Thomas Butler.

== Personal life ==
He married Martha Grundy, the daughter of a judge, Felix Grundy. By 1860, she owned 202 slaves and 4,550 acres of land.

== Death ==
He died of yellow fever on November 8, 1854, at his Ducros Plantation in Louisiana. He was buried at the Nashville City Cemetery in Nashville, Tennessee alongside his wife.
