= John Perkins Sr. =

American judge

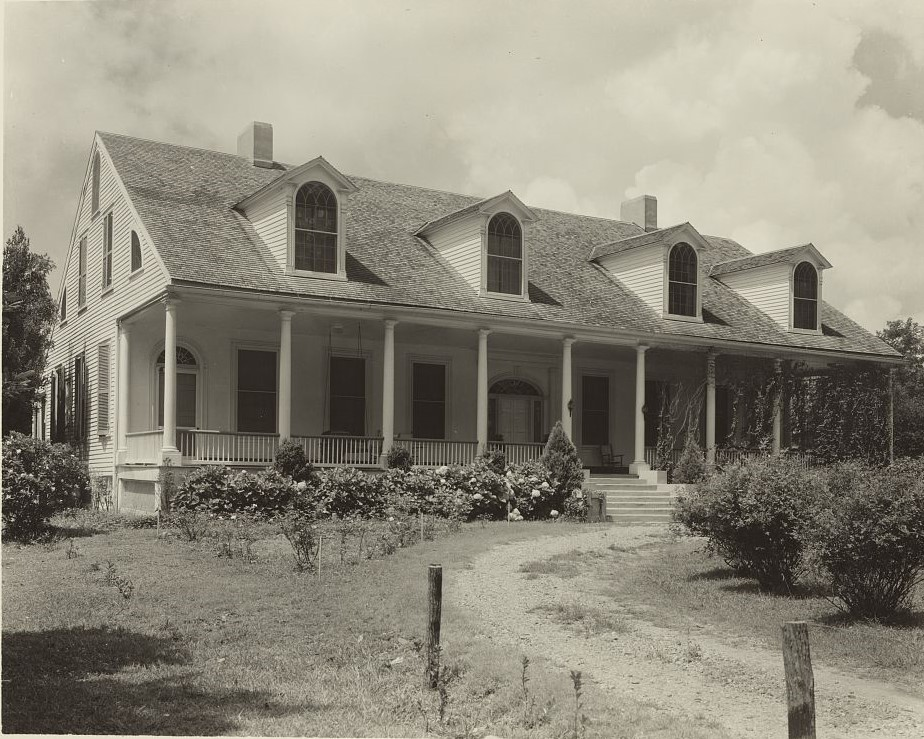
- The Briars, Natchez vic., by Frances Benjamin Johnston, 1938.

Personal details
- Born: John Perkins; May 17, 1781 Somerset County, Maryland
- Died: November 30, 1866 (aged 85) Adams County, Mississippi
- Resting place: Natchez City Cemetery, Natchez, Mississippi
- Relations: John Perkins Jr. (son)

John Perkins Sr. (1781–1866) was an American judge and planter.

== Biography ==
Perkins was born on May 17, 1781, in Somerset County, Maryland. His father was an English-born immigrant. He was the owner of a plantation in Vidalia, Louisiana, from 1807 to 1811. He eventually became the owner of "Somerset", an 18,000-acre estate in Madison Parish and Tensas Parish. He married Mrs. Bynum, a widow, in 1818. They had two sons, including John Perkins Jr., a politician, and William Perkins, who died at sea in 1854. After he was widowed, he married Mrs. Seaton of Port Gibson, Mississippi. They resided at "The Briars" in Natchez. Perkins died on November 30, 1866, in Adams County, Mississippi.
