= John McGavock =

- Portrait of John McGavock by Washington Bogart Cooper
- Born: April 2, 1815
- Died: June 7, 1893 (aged 78)
- Occupation: Farmer
- Spouse: Carrie Elizabeth Winder
- Children: Winder McGavock
- Parent: Randal McGavock

Col. John McGavock (1815–1893) was an American heir and Southern planter.

== Early life ==
John McGavock was born on April 2, 1815. His father was Randal McGavock (1766–1843), Mayor of Nashville from 1824 to 1825 and owner of the Carnton Southern plantation in Franklin, Tennessee. His sister Elizabeth Irwin McGavock was married to William Giles Harding, owner of the Belle Meade Plantation.

== Career ==
McGavock worked as private secretary for Felix Grundy in his Washington, D.C. office.

Upon his father's death, he inherited the Carnton plantation. He soon added a Greek Revival two-story portico at the front and a two-story gallery at the rear. Washington Bogart Cooper (1802–1888) painted his portrait circa 1850.

During the American Civil War, Carnton was damaged by the Battle of Franklin and served as a hospital for the Confederacy. On December 1, 1864, four Confederate Generals lay dead at Carnton: Patrick R. Cleburne, Hiram B. Granbury, John Adams, and Otho F. Strahl. In 1866, McGavock donated two acres of land to establish the McGavock Confederate Cemetery on the plantation.

== Personal life ==
He married Carrie Elizabeth Winder (1829–1905) in December 1848. They had a son, Winder McGavock (1857–1907), and a daughter, Hattie, who married George Cowan.

== Death ==
McGavock died on June 7, 1893, at the age of seventy-eight.
