= McGavock-Gatewood-Webb House =

Historic house in Tennessee, United States

- U.S. National Register of Historic Places
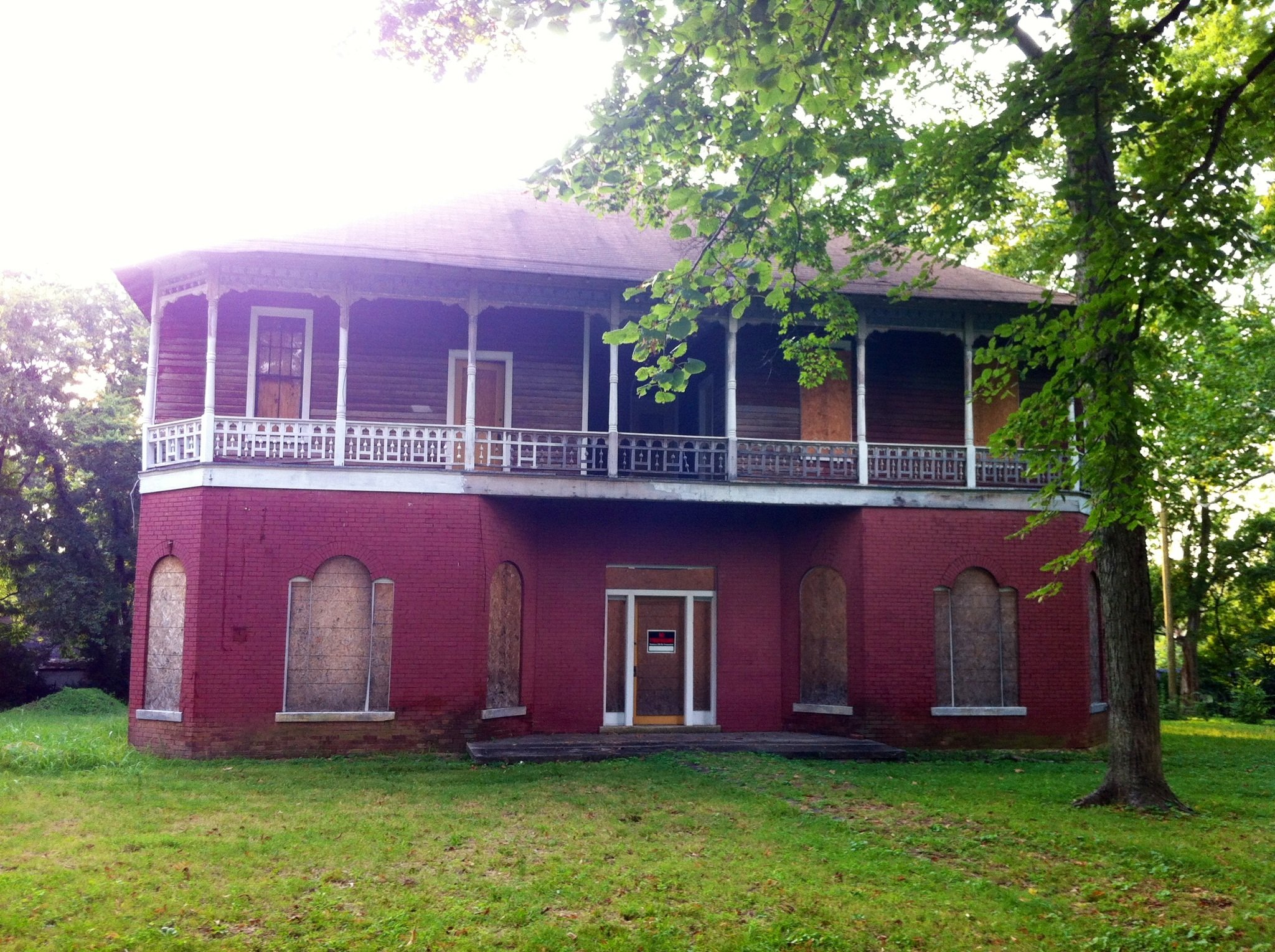
- The McGavock-Gatewood-Webb House in 2013

- Location within Tennessee Location within the United States
- Location: 908 Meridian Street, Nashville, Tennessee, U.S.
- Coordinates: 36.18779°N 86.76862°W
- Built: c. 1840
- NRHP reference No.: 07000688
- Added to NRHP: July 11, 2007

The McGavock-Gatewood-Webb House, also known as Blue Fountain, is a historic house in Nashville, Tennessee, USA. It was built in the 1840s.

== Location ==
The house is located at 908 Meridian Street in Nashville, the county seat of Davidson County, Tennessee. It is located opposite the Ray of Hope Community Church (formerly known as the Meridian Street United Methodist Church, built in 1925), between Vaughn Street and Cleveland Street. It is in the neighborhood of Cleveland Park, in East Nashville. It is East of Downtown Nashville, and East of the Cumberland River.

== History ==
The house is linked to the McGavock family. In 1754–1755, James McGavock moved from County Antrim, Ireland to Philadelphia. By 1765, his son, David McGavock, acquired 640 acres of land East of the Cumberland River, though he did not live here. (Another son, Randal McGavock, who served as the mayor of Nashville from 1824 to 1825, built the Carnton plantation in Franklin, Tennessee.) The estate was divided into two sections for each of his two sons: John McGavock inherited 320 acres, as did James McGavock.

Shortly before his death, James McGavock built this house, known as Fountain Blue upon its completion circa 1840. It was designed in the Federal architectural style. After James McGavock died in 1841, the 320 acres were divided into four for each of his children.

The 94 acres with the Fountain Blue house were inherited by his daughter Lucinda. Lucinda lived here with her husband, Jeremiah George Harris, the editor of the Nashville Union newspaper and a supporter of President James K. Polk, their son Joseph, and their daughter Lucie. Harris redesigned the house circa 1844, adding Greek Revival finishes and French wallpaper. After Lucinda died in 1847, husband and children continued to live in the house.

During the American Civil War of 1861–1865, the house was uninhabited, as Jeremiah served in the Union Navy while his son Joseph in the Confederate States Army in Knoxville, Tennessee, and his daughter Lucie was in the Northern states. After the war, in 1868, Lucie moved into the house with her husband, Professor Van Sinderen Lindsley, a Professor of Surgical Anatomy at the University of Nashville. They redesigned the house in the Italianate architectural style circa 1870, and Meridian Street was created a year later, in 1871.

The house was purchased by Leslie Emmett Gatewood in 1891. Gatewood lived here until 1905, when he sold it to Alonzo C. Webb. Webb rented the house to Professor J. J. Keys, the superintendent of Nashville public schools. By 1915, Webb house was converted into apartments for lease. After his death in 1939, the house changed ownership several times before it was owned by Webb's son, Hanor Webb, as a rental property.

In 2003, the house was purchased by the Ray of Hope Community Church to house the Better Tomorrows Adult Education Center.

== Architectural significance ==
It has been listed on the National Register of Historic Places since July 11, 2007.
