= McGavock–Gaines House =

Historic house in Tennessee, United States

- U.S. National Register of Historic Places
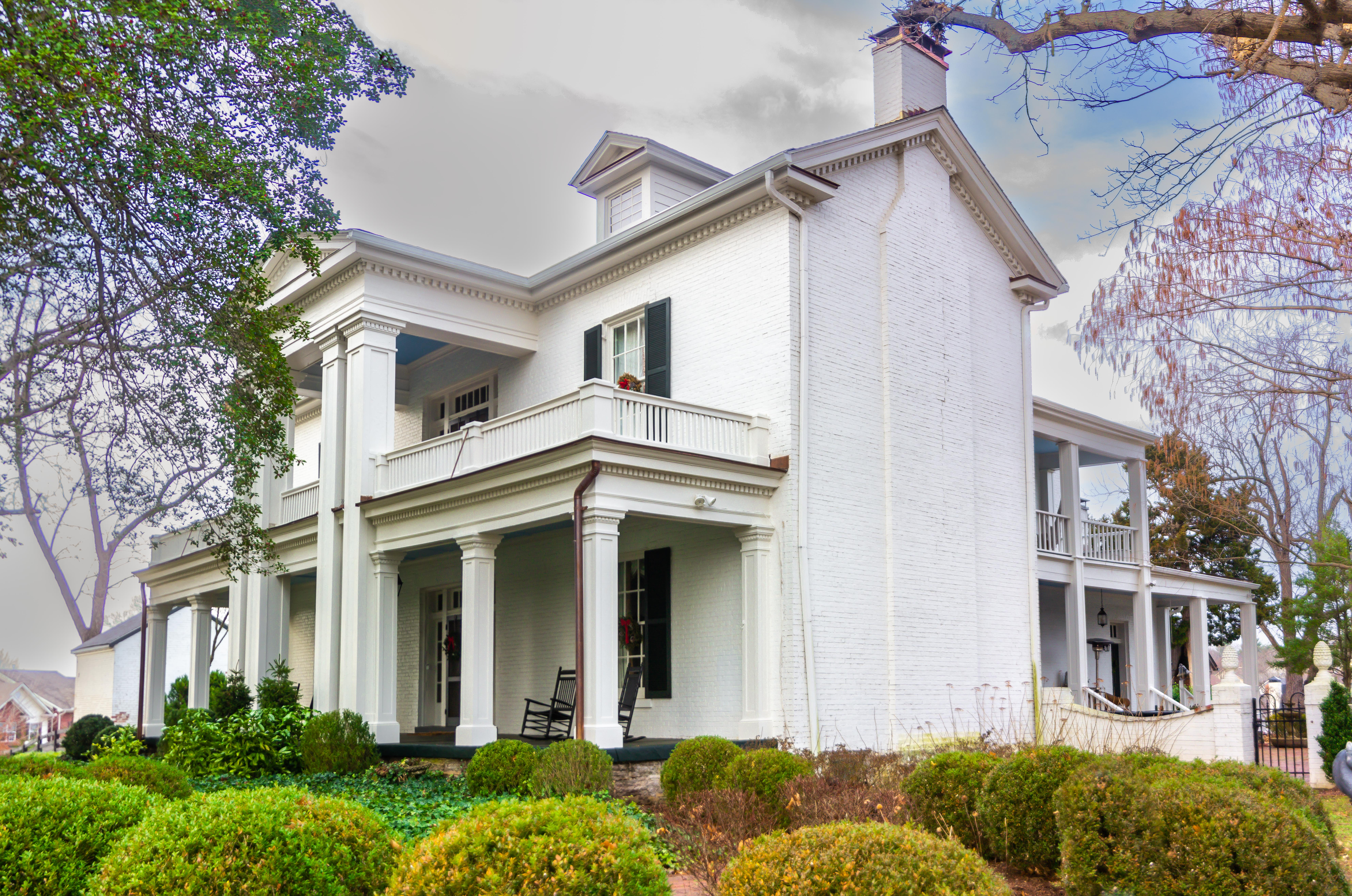

- Location within Tennessee Location within the United States
- Location: 1008 Culpepper Ln., Franklin, Tennessee
- Coordinates: 35°54′1″N 86°50′25″W
- Area: 3.2 acres (1.3 ha)
- Built: c.1840, c.1907 and c.1920
- Architectural style: Classical Revival
- MPS: Williamson County MRA
- NRHP reference No.: 88000329
- Added to NRHP: April 13, 1988

The McGavock–Gaines House, also known as Riverside, is a historic mansion in Franklin, Tennessee. It was listed on the National Register of Historic Places in 1988. The property then included two contributing buildings, one contributing structure, and one non-contributing building, on an area of 3.2 acres (1.3 ha).

== Location ==
The house is located on Caruthers Road, east of the Lewisburg Pike, in Franklin, a small town in Williamson County near Nashville, in the Southern state of Tennessee.

== History ==
The mansion was built circa 1835 for James Randal McGavock, the son of Randal McGavock, who served as the mayor of Nashville, Tennessee from 1824 to 1825 and owned the Carnton Plantation.

It was remodelled into Classical Revival style in 1902 and renamed as Riverside. This included adding the house's two-story portico and completely remodeling the interior.
