= McGavock Confederate Cemetery =

Burial ground for the Battle of Franklin, Tennessee

Coordinates: 35.9042240°N 86.8591626°W

- McGavock Cemetery with Carnton in background
- Interactive map of McGavock Confederate Cemetery

Details
- Established: June 1866
- Location: Franklin, Tennessee

The McGavock Confederate Cemetery is located in Franklin, Tennessee. It was established in June 1866 as a private cemetery on land donated by the McGavock planter family.

The nearly 1,500 Confederate soldiers buried there were casualties of the Battle of Franklin that took place November 30, 1864. They were first buried at the battleground, but were reinterred in 1866. While 780 of the soldiers have been identified, 558 are still unknown. Since 1905 the cemetery has been maintained by the Franklin chapter of the United Daughters of the Confederacy.

== History ==
The aftermath of the Battle of Franklin, which took place during the night of November 30, 1864, left a total of nearly 9,500 soldiers, Union and Confederate dead, wounded, captured or missing. More than 6,200 were Confederate troops. Their final losses were estimated at 1,750 dead; 3,800 wounded, and the remainder missing or captured.

The population of Franklin in 1860 was just over 900. When Franklin residents awoke on the morning of December 1, their concern was how to bury thousands of soldiers and care for the wounded. Colonel John and Carrie McGavock's plantation house, Carnton, was situated less than one mile (1.6 km) from the center of the action on the Union eastern flank at Franklin. Due to its geographical proximity, Carnton served as the largest field hospital in the area for hundreds of wounded and dying Confederate soldiers.

Carrie Winder McGavock led the efforts, supervising the logistics, and ordering her enslaved African-American workers to assist. She donated food, clothing and supplies to care for the wounded and dying. Carrie's two surviving children, Hattie (age nine) and Winder (age seven), served as medical aides throughout the evening as well. At least 150 Confederate soldiers died the first night at Carnton.

Most of the Confederate (and Union dead) were buried by soldiers and enslaved workers "near and along the length of the Federal breastworks, which spanned the southern edge of what was then Franklin.". Union dead were placed by twos in shallow graves in long rows by their comrades without marking the identities. Many of the Union dead were later removed either by family or loved ones, or by the military and relocated in graves at home. The Stones River National Cemetery was established in 1864 in Murfreesboro, Tennessee. The remains of Union soldiers from Franklin and other battlefields were reinterred here from 1865 to 1867 by the 11th United States Colored Troops.

It was not until December 1, 1864, that burial teams identified most of the 1,750 Confederate dead near Carnton. Soldier burial teams collected and identified their comrades. They placed makeshift wooden markers at the head of the graves to identify individuals by name, rank, regiment, and company.

Most of the Confederate dead were buried on properties owned by Fountain Branch Carter and James McNutt. Carter had the largest section of land occupied with interments. He lost his own son, Todd Carter, in the Battle of Franklin. The Carter-McNutt land was considered in temporary use as a cemetery. By the spring of 1866, the condition of the graves and markers on the Carter-McNutt lands were worsening. Many of the wooden markers were beginning to be hard to read, and some had been used as firewood at a time of shortages. The full identities of these men were at risk of being lost.

== New cemetery ==
The McGavocks of Carnton donated 2 acres (8,100 m^{2}) of their property to be used as a permanent burial ground for the soldiers. Citizens of Franklin began raising funds to exhume and re-bury nearly 1,500 Confederate soldiers to the field just northwest of the Carnton house. With enough money raised to get started, the group paid George Cuppett to manage the re-burial operation. He was paid $5.00 for each soldier. The work was "done in order to have removed from fields exposed to the plow-share, the remains of all those who were buried," according to Col. John McGavock.

Cuppett was assisted by his brother Marcellus and two others. The entire operation took ten weeks and was completed in June 1866. Marcellus, 25 years old, fell ill during the process and died. He was buried at the head of the Texas section in the cemetery. George Cuppett wrote, "My hole (sic) heart is with the brave & noble Confederate dead who fell whilst battling for their writes (sic) and Libertys (sic)." (Jacobson: McGavock, p. 25)

Soldiers from every Southern state in the Confederacy, except Virginia, are represented in the cemetery. Wooden headboards with the soldier's personal identification were installed. Footboards were added in 1867. The fence was added with the assistance of Georgia author Mary Ann Harris Gay, whose brother had died in the battle. She raised $5,000 to fund the iron fence and gate, which is marked with a plaque bearing her name.

== McGavock Cemetery book ==
Headstone of John Russell, 6th Arkansas, killed at Franklin

George Cuppett wrote the names and information related to the identity of each soldier in a cemetery book. After he finished the re-burials in mid-1866, he turned over the care of the book to the McGavocks.

In 1896, the "John McEweb Bivouac" veterans organization raised funds to replace the wooden headboards with granite markers. Carrie McGavock managed the maintenance of the cemetery with African-American workers until her death in 1905. The original cemetery book is on display upstairs in the Carnton great house.

After 1905, the Franklin Chapter of the United Daughters of the Confederacy took over financial responsibility to maintain the cemetery. Today 780 Confederate soldiers’ identities are positively identified, leaving some 558 as officially listed as unknown.

== The cemetery today ==
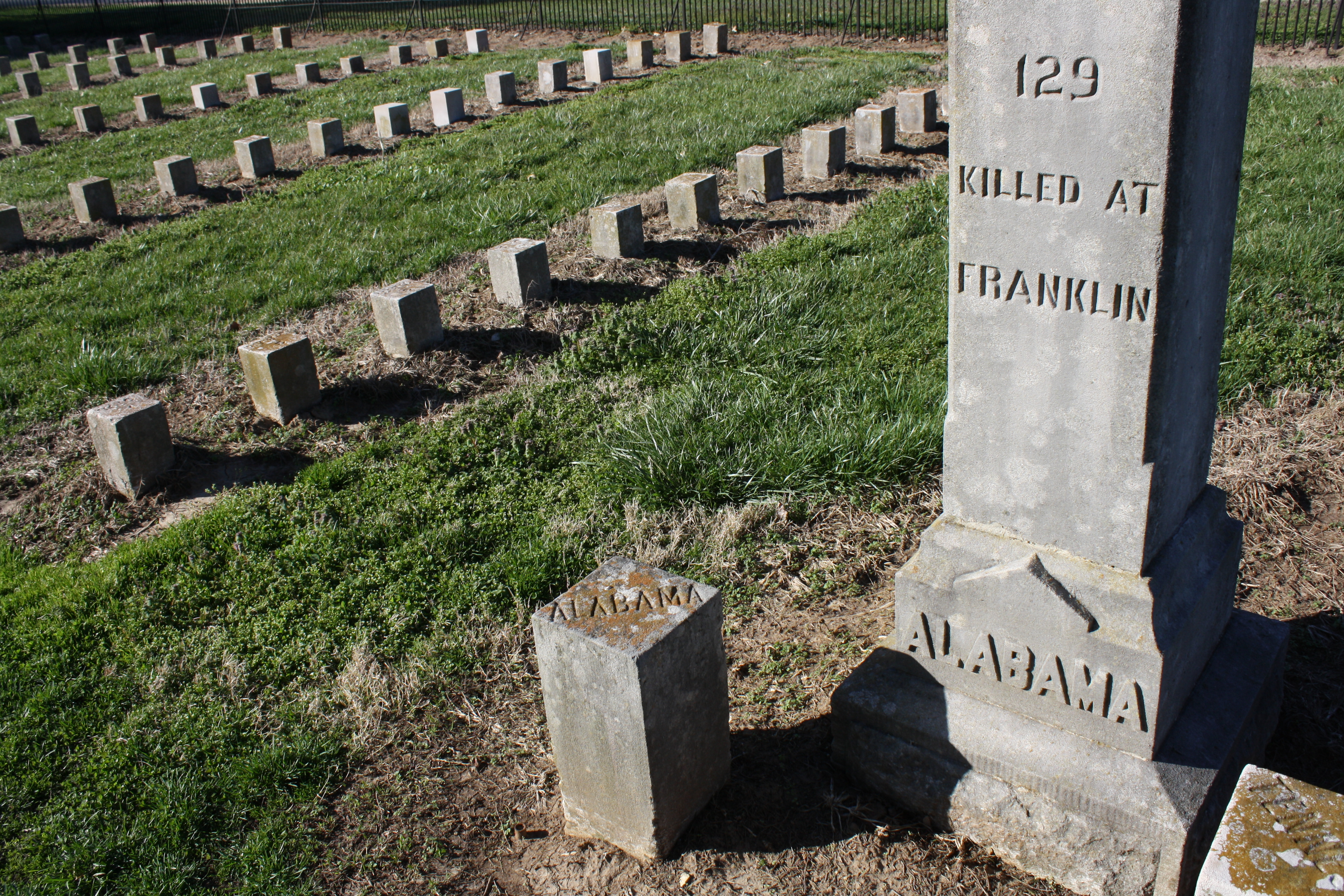

The cemetery is located off Lewisburg Pike just a few minutes from downtown Franklin. The graves take up a 2-acre (0.81 ha) section of the Carnton plantation property. The thirteen sections are organized by states. The two sections are separated by a 14-foot (4.3 m) pathway.

On the left side, upon entering are the following sections (with the number of dead buried in parentheses): left front row one will find North Carolina (2), Kentucky (5) and Florida (4). Next section, Unknown (225). Next section, Louisiana (19). Next section, South Carolina (51). Next section, Georgia (69). Next section, Alabama (129). Next section, Tennessee (230).

On the right side, upon entering are the following sections (with the number of dead buried in parentheses): Mississippi (424), the State with the largest number of men who died at Franklin. Next section, Arkansas (104). Next section, Missouri (130). Next section, Texas (89).
