= Randal McGavock =

American politician (1766–1843)

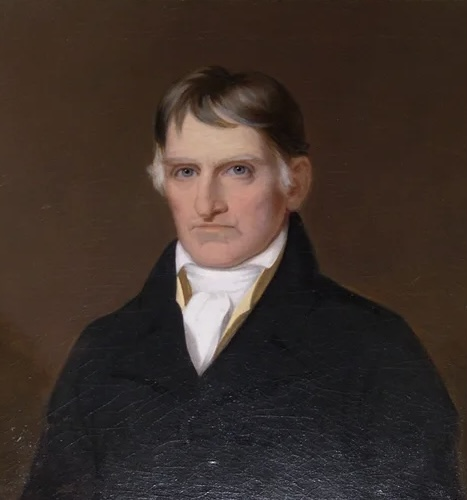
- McGavock by Washington Cooper
- Born: June 20, 1766; Rockbridge County, Virginia
- Died: September 1843 (aged 77); Davidson County, Tennessee
- Resting place: McGavock Family Cemetery
- Occupations: Politician; Planter
- Spouse: Sarah Dougherty Rodgers
- Children: James R. McGavock; William McGavock; John McGavock unnamed infant son Elizabeth McGavock; Mary Cloyd McGavock unnamed infant daughter
- Relatives: Felix Grundy (brother-in-law); William Giles Harding (son-in-law); Randal William McGavock (great-nephew)

Randal McGavock (1766–1843) was an American politician and Southern planter in Nashville, Tennessee. Identifying as a Jeffersonian Republican, he served as the Mayor of Nashville, Tennessee from 1824 to 1825.

His daughter Elizabeth married William Giles Harding of Nashville in 1840; he was a young widower and son of planter John Harding. He was running the 5300-acre Belle Meade Plantation and managing his father's slaves; in 1850 his father was ranked as the third-largest slaveholder in Davidson County, Tennessee.

== Early life ==
Randal McGavock was born on June 20, 1766, in Rockbridge County, Virginia. His father was James McGavock Sr., and his mother, Mary (Cloyd) McGavock.

== Career ==
McGavock served as Mayor of Nashville from 1824 to 1825.

In 1815, McGavock built Carnton. During the American Civil War, Carnton served as a field hospital after the Battle of Franklin. On December 1, 1864, four dead Confederate generals were laid on Carnton's gallery: Patrick R. Cleburne, Hiram B. Granbury, John Adams, and Otho F. Strahl.

== Personal life ==
In February 1811, McGavock married Sarah Dougherty Rodgers, whose brother-in-law was Felix Grundy (1775–1840), U.S. Congressman from Tennessee, from 1829 to 1838, and 13th United States Attorney General, from 1838 to 1839. They had four sons, James R., William, John, an unnamed infant son, and three daughters, Elizabeth, Mary Cloyd and an unnamed infant daughter.

In 1840, their daughter Elizabeth married Gen. William Giles Harding, heir and later owner of the Belle Meade Plantation, which was 5400 acres.

Their son John McGavock (1815–1893), who married Carrie Elizabeth Winder (1829–1905) in December 1848, inherited the Carnton plantation. His great-nephew, Randal William McGavock (1826–1863), the grandson of his brother Hugh, also became a politician. He served as Mayor of Nashville from 1858 to 1859, and died as a Confederate Lt. Col. in the Battle of Raymond.

His nephew, James McGavock, built Blue Fountain, now known as the McGavock-Gatewood-Webb House in East Nashville.

== Death ==
McGavock died in September 1843. He is interred at Mount Olivet Cemetery in Nashville.

Political offices
Preceded by Robert Brownlee Currey	Mayor of Nashville, Tennessee; 1824–1825	Succeeded by Wilkins F. Tannehill
