= Washington Bogart Cooper =

American painter

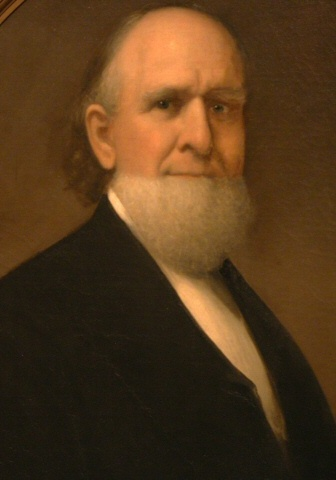
- Self-portrait, c. 1885
- Born: September 18, 1802 near Jonesborough, Tennessee, U.S.
- Died: March 30, 1888 (aged 85); Nashville, Tennessee, U.S.
- Resting place: Mount Olivet Cemetery
- Occupation: Painter
- Spouse: Ann Litton
- Children: James Cooper; James Litton Cooper; Kate Cooper; Joseph Litton Cooper
- Relatives: William Brown Cooper (brother)

Washington Bogart Cooper (September 18, 1802 – March 30, 1888) was an American portrait painter, sometimes known as "the man of a thousand portraits".

== Early life ==
Washington Bogart Cooper was born near Jonesborough, Tennessee, on September 18, 1802, one of nine children. A brother, William Brown Cooper (1811–1890), also became a painter. As a child, he lived near Carthage, Tennessee and Shelbyville, Tennessee. He studied art with Ralph Eleaser Whiteside Earl in Murfreesboro and settled in Nashville in 1830. In 1831, he went to Philadelphia, Pennsylvania, to study art with Thomas Sully and Henry Inman, and returned to Nashville in 1832.

== Career ==
From 1837 to 1848, Cooper averaged thirty-five portraits a year. His portraits of Tennessee governors, commissioned by the Tennessee Historical Society, can be seen in the Tennessee State Capitol and the Tennessee State Museum in Nashville. He also did portraits for the Methodist Episcopal Church, South, and the Grand Lodge of Tennessee, as well as a portrait of Alexander Campbell. The Tennessee State Museum holds fifty of his portraits. His account book can be found on microfilm in the Tennessee State Library and Archives. Some of his portraits are in Natchez, Mississippi, where he made a trip with his brother.

== Personal life ==
In 1839, Cooper married Ann Litton from Dublin, Ireland. The couple had four children: James (1840–1843), James Litton (1844–1924), Kate (1846–1919), and Joseph Litton (1849–1936). A portrait of the three younger children is displayed in the Tennessee State Museum. The artist's family has a portrait that Cooper painted of his wife in about 1842. It is unlike his typical work, in that it shows the subject in profile, reading. It is considered to resemble Jean-Honoré Fragonard's A Young Girl Reading.

== Death ==
Washington Cooper died of pneumonia on March 30, 1888, at the age of eighty-five, and he is buried in the Mount Olivet Cemetery in Nashville.

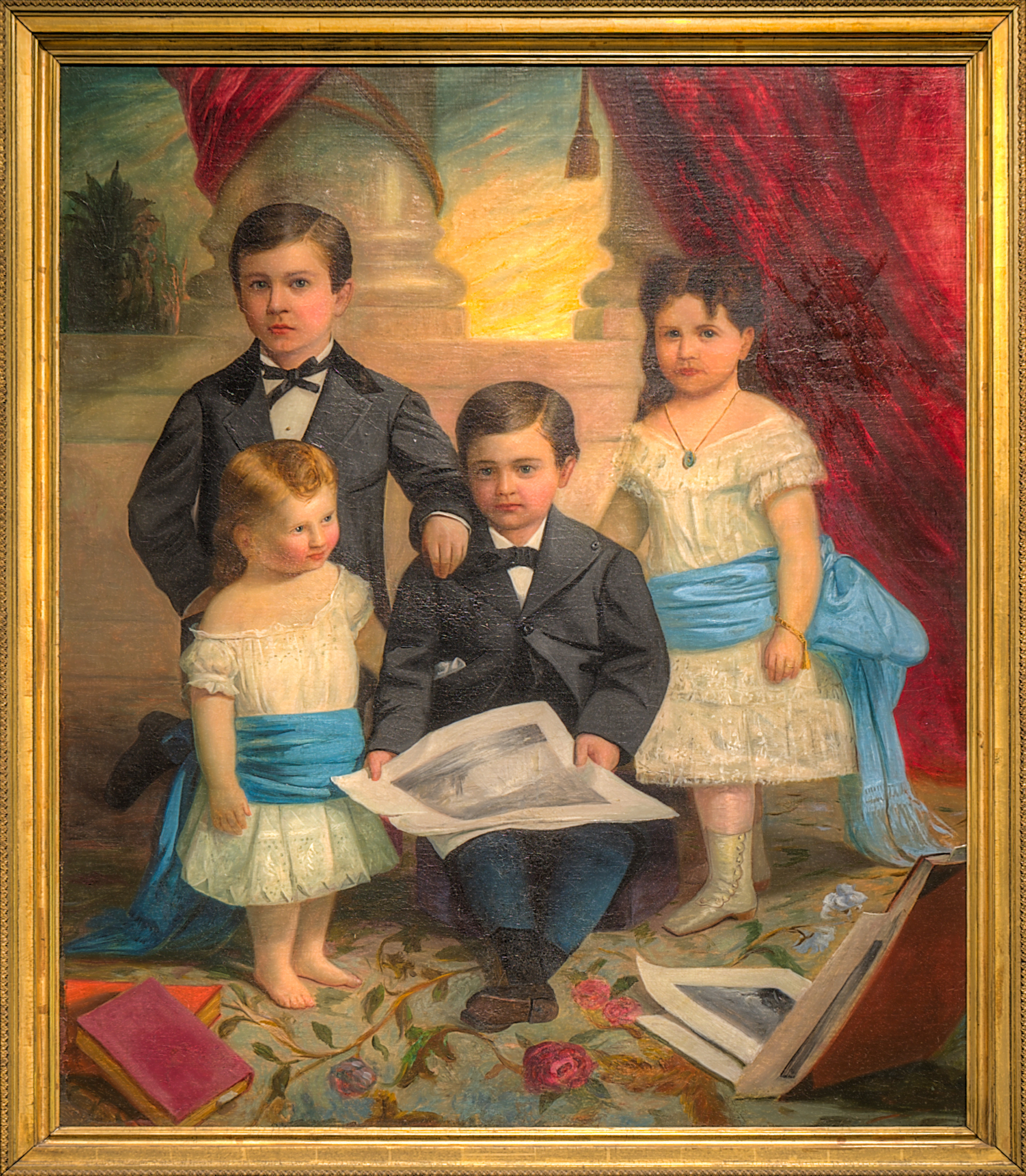
Painting of the Sykes Children at the Tennessee State Museum

== See also ==
- Lloyd Branson
