= Ducros Plantation =

Historic house in Louisiana, United States

- U.S. National Register of Historic Places
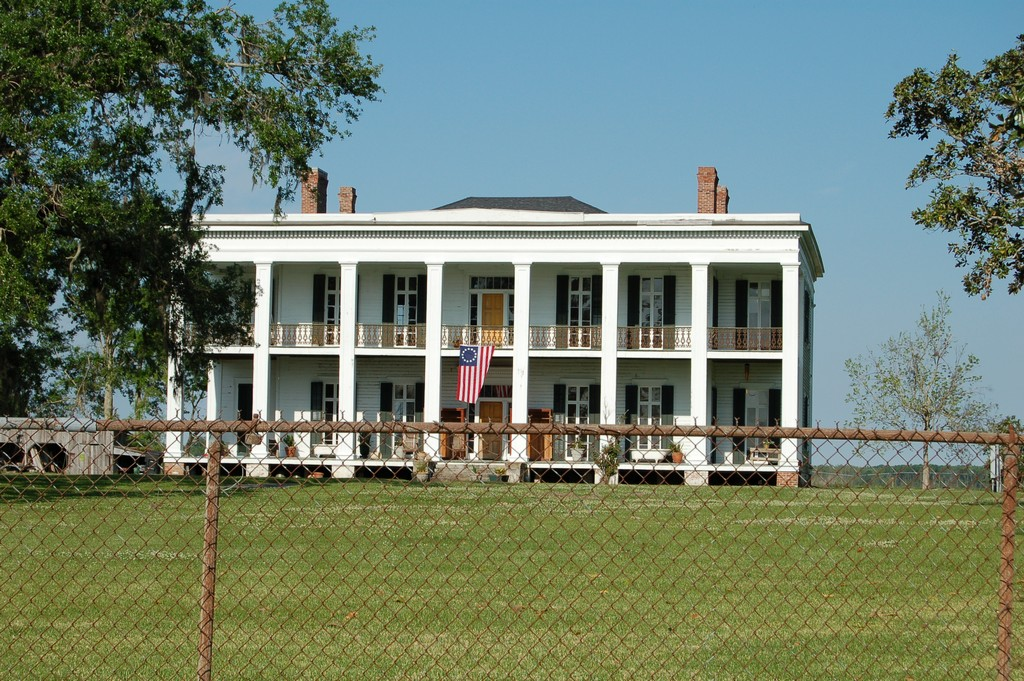
- The east facade, seen from Old Schriever Hwy

- Location within Louisiana Location within the United States
- Nearest city: Schriever, Louisiana
- Coordinates: 29°45′15″N 90°49′5″W
- Built: 1859-1860
- Architectural style: Greek Revival
- NRHP reference No.: 85002759
- Added to NRHP: November 7, 1985

The Ducros Plantation (a.k.a. Old Jackson Plantation or Polmer Plantation) is a Southern plantation located in Schriever, Louisiana.

== Location ==
The plantation is located in Schriever, Terrebone Parish, Louisiana. It is two miles and a half away from Thibodaux.

== History ==
The land was granted by Spain to Thomas Villanueva Barroso who, 10 years later, sold it to Pierre Denis de La Ronde whose son-in-law, Adolphe Ducros, developed it into the Ducros Plantation. In 1845, Ducros sold it to Colonel Van Perkins Winder. Winder expanded the acreage by purchasing adjacent land formerly owned by Thomas Butler and smaller farms.

The mansion was built by Winder's widow, Martha Grundy, who was Felix Grundy's daughter, shortly after her husband's death. Construction began in 1859 and was completed in 1860. It was designed in the Greek Revival architectural style. Martha hired a Louisiana architect named Evens and told him to model the mansion on The Hermitage, Andrew Jackson's plantation home in Nashville, Tennessee. Indeed, she had grown up in Nashville.

During the American Civil War of 1861–1865, the mansion was saved from a fire by Union General Godfrey Weitzel. However, the outbuildings burned down. Meanwhile, the fields were used as a camping ground by the Confederate States Army and the Unionists. The Texas Rangers hoisted Bonnie Blue Flag, a flag of the Confederate States of America, on top of the house.

In 1872, the plantation was purchased by two brothers, R.S. Woods and R.C. Woods, who were married to two sisters, Maggie Pugh and Fannie Pugh. It became known as the Old Jackson Plantation. It is two-story high, with a white facade.

It was purchased by Samuel and Leon Polmer in 1909. It was later inherited by Leon Polmer's sons, Irvin and Marvin. In 1974, it was inherited by J.L. Fischman of New Orleans.

The plantation is now owned by the Bourgeois family. It was featured on If These Walls Could Talk, a television program on HGTV, in 2002. Old wood with inscriptions about the secession of South Carolina and the presidential run of Stephen A. Douglas in 1860 have been found on the property.

== Heritage significance ==
It has been listed on the National Register of Historic Places since November 7, 1985.
