= Madagascar World Voice =

Madagascar World Voice (Callsign: MWV) is a shortwave radio station located in Mahajanga. The station began transmissions in 2016 and is operated by World Christian Broadcasting as a sister station of KNLS in Alaska, USA.

== History ==
Due to the extreme northerly location of KNLS, World Christian Broadcasting sought a second transmission site in the southern hemisphere. Work began on building the transmission site in 2006 but due to difficult circumstances (including cyclones, a coup and local instability), the work was curtailed for several years. Thanks to changes in the government, work began again on building the transmission site, with broadcasts beginning in 2016.

== KNLS today ==
KNLS is on the air each day for 13 hours each day in English, Spanish, Russian, Arabic and Chinese. Programming is produced at the station’s Operations Center in Franklin, Tennessee, a suburb of Nashville. Programs are presented in a magazine-style format and provide Bible and religious teaching segments, as well as practical subjects such as family life and the dangers of domestic abuse, as well as music.

KNLS never asks listeners to send money. The station is funded by individuals, churches and other groups. The Bibles and other materials that listeners request are sent free of charge.
