= March to Freedom =

Statue in Franklin, Tennessee, U.S.

- Artist: Joe F. Howard
- Year: 2021
- Location: Franklin, Tennessee; 35.92480°N 86.86898°W

March to Freedom is a statue by Joe F. Howard, installed outside the Williamson County Courthouse in Franklin, Tennessee. The bronze sculpture depicts a United States Colored Troops soldier.

== History ==
In recent years, as part of ongoing removal of Confederate monuments and memorials, there have been similar calls made for removal of the Confederate Monument in Franklin. However, a lawsuit arose between the city of Franklin and the United Daughters of the Confederacy over ownership of the Franklin Confederate Monument, as well as ownership of the city square on which the monument is located. Consequently, a local historian recommended the erection of historical markers to relate the experiences of African Americans during the Civil War era. Five such markers were erected in 2019 on the Williamson County Courthouse grounds, across the street from the Confederate Monument on the city square. On October 23, 2021, the bronze March to Freedom statue of an African American soldier from the U.S. Colored Troops, was unveiled and dedicated on the courthouse grounds. The historical markers and bronze statue were funded entirely through private donations.

== Description ==
The statue portrays a black soldier in a well-worn uniform of the Union Army. The soldier holds a rifle and has one foot on a tree stump to indicate that no black man will ever be lynched from the tree's branches. Broken shackles are connected to the tree stump to symbolize that no man will ever again be chained and sold. The name – March to Freedom – symbolizes the march of soldiers into battle, as well as marches that took place during civil rights movements.
