= O'More College of Design =

Former art school now part of Belmont University

Coordinates: 35.9200°N 86.8682°W

O’More College of Design was a private college in Franklin, Tennessee, United States. In February 2018, it merged with Belmont University in Nashville, Tennessee to become the O'More School of Design at Belmont University.

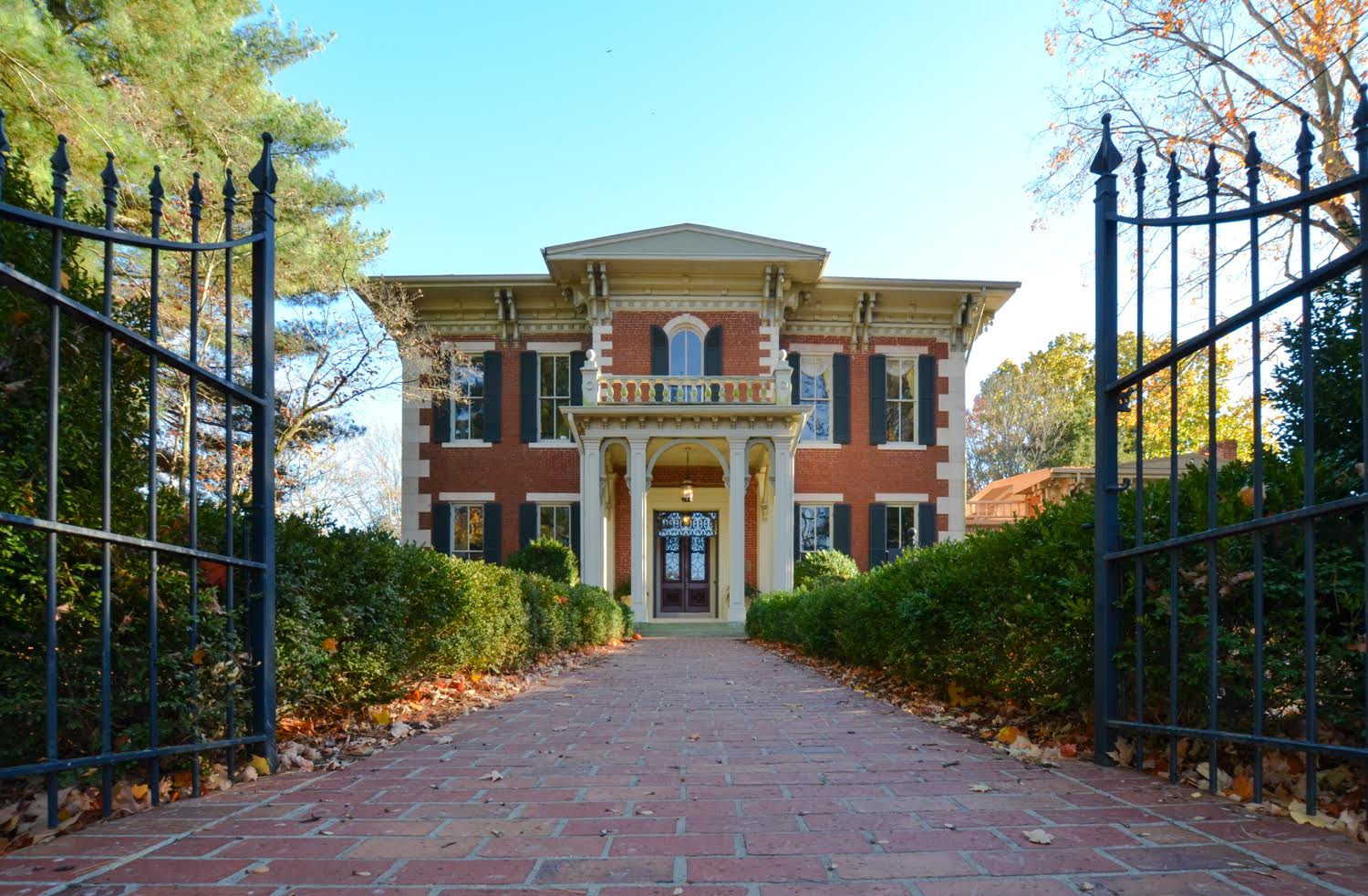
Abbey Leix Mansion, also known as the Winstead House, formerly the administration building for the O'More College of Design.

It was founded as O'More School of Interior Architecture and Design in 1970 in the historic district of Franklin. It awarded the Bachelor of Fine Arts degree in fashion design, fashion merchandising, graphic design, and interior design. It had an enrollment of about 200 students and was accredited by the Accrediting Commission of Career Schools and Colleges.
