= Williamson County Courthouse (Tennessee) =

Historic place in Tennessee, United States

- U.S. Historic district – Contributing property
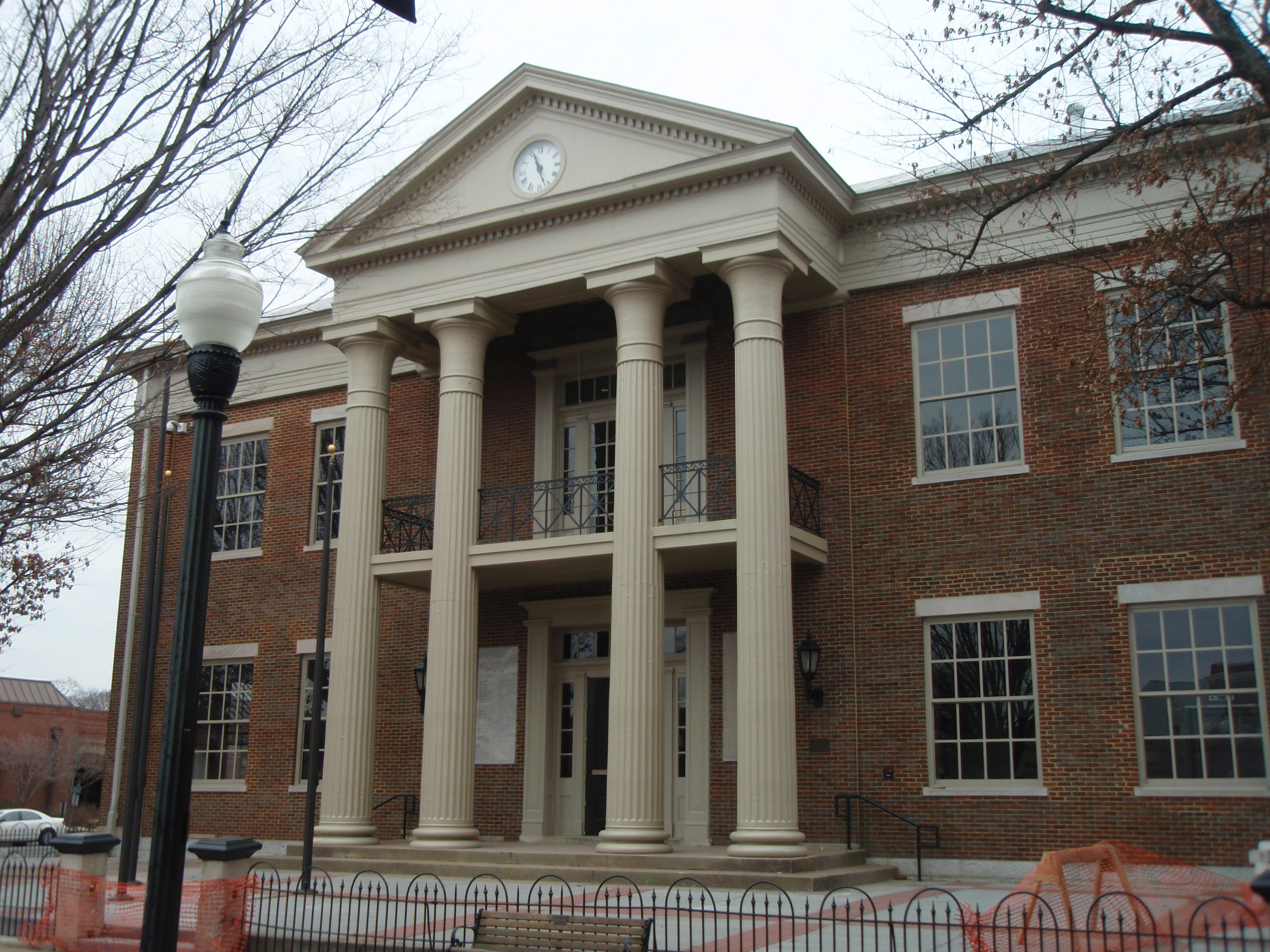
- Courthouse in 2009

- Location within Tennessee Location within the United States
- Interactive map showing the location of Williamson County Courthouse
- Location: Franklin, Tennessee
- Coordinates: 35°55′26″N 86°52′09″W
- Architectural style: Greek Revival
- Part of: Franklin Historic District (ID72001254)
- MPS: Williamson County MRA (AD)
- Designated CP: October 5, 1972

The Williamson County Courthouse in Franklin, Tennessee is a historic courthouse. It is a contributing building in the Franklin Historic District, listed on the National Register of Historic Places.

The courthouse was built in 1858 and is the third one to serve the county. It is Greek Revival in style and 65 by 90 feet (20 m × 27 m) in plan. Its portico has four Doric columns which were cast at a nearby foundry.

It was damaged in an 1871 tornado but was restored.

In 1888, a 23-year-old African-American suspect, Amos Miller, was lynched: hanged from the balcony of the courthouse after being taken by a mob from the courtroom before his trial was completed.

The courthouse can be seen in the closing scene of the 1986 film At Close Range starring Sean Penn.

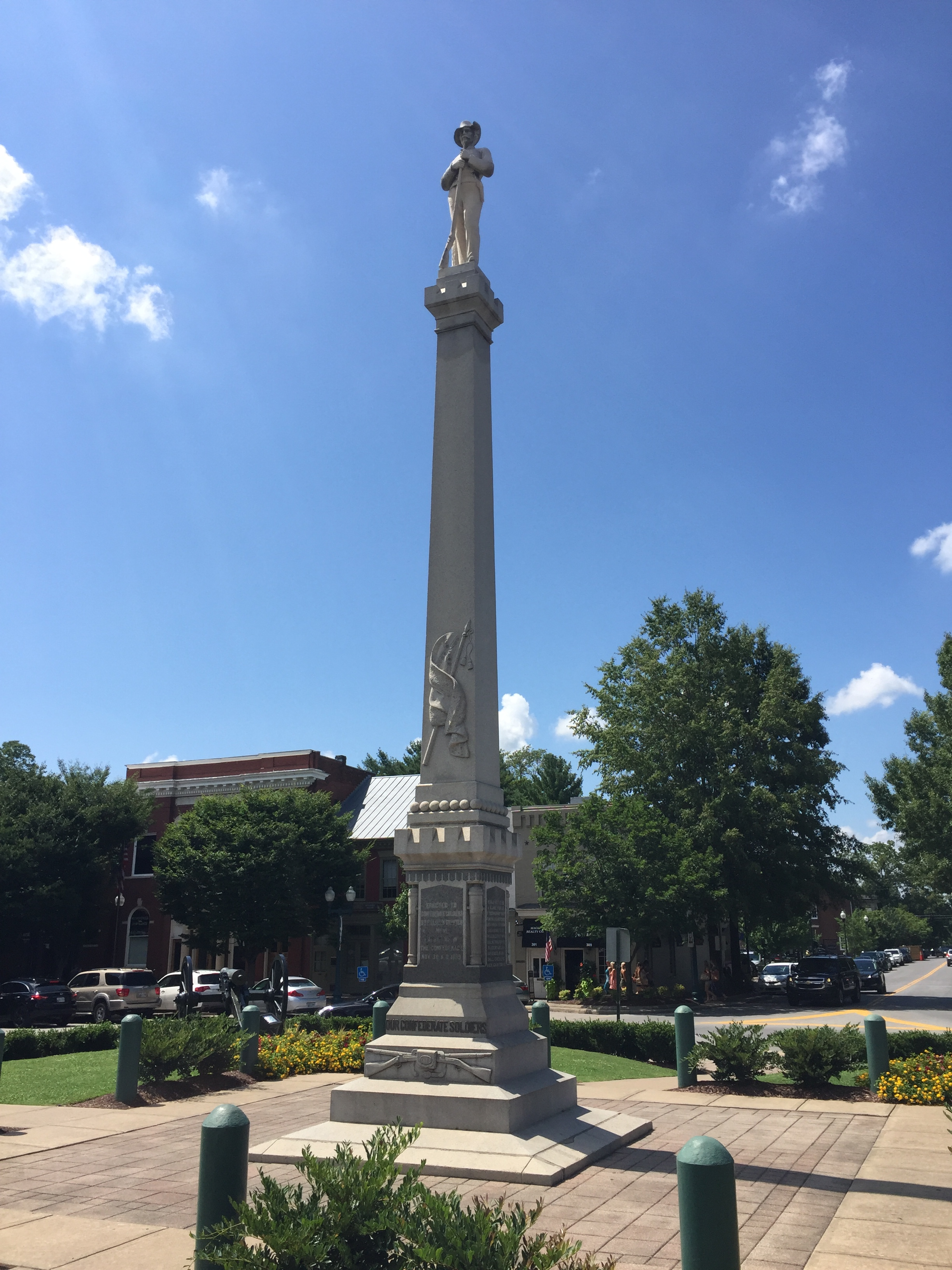
Confederate Monument

On the grounds of the courthouse is a Confederate Monument, which is separately listed on the National Register. A statue, March to Freedom was also installed outside.

== See also ==
- Lynching of Amos Miller
