= Franklin Historic District (Franklin, Tennessee) =

Historic district in Tennessee, United States

- U.S. National Register of Historic Places
- U.S. Historic district
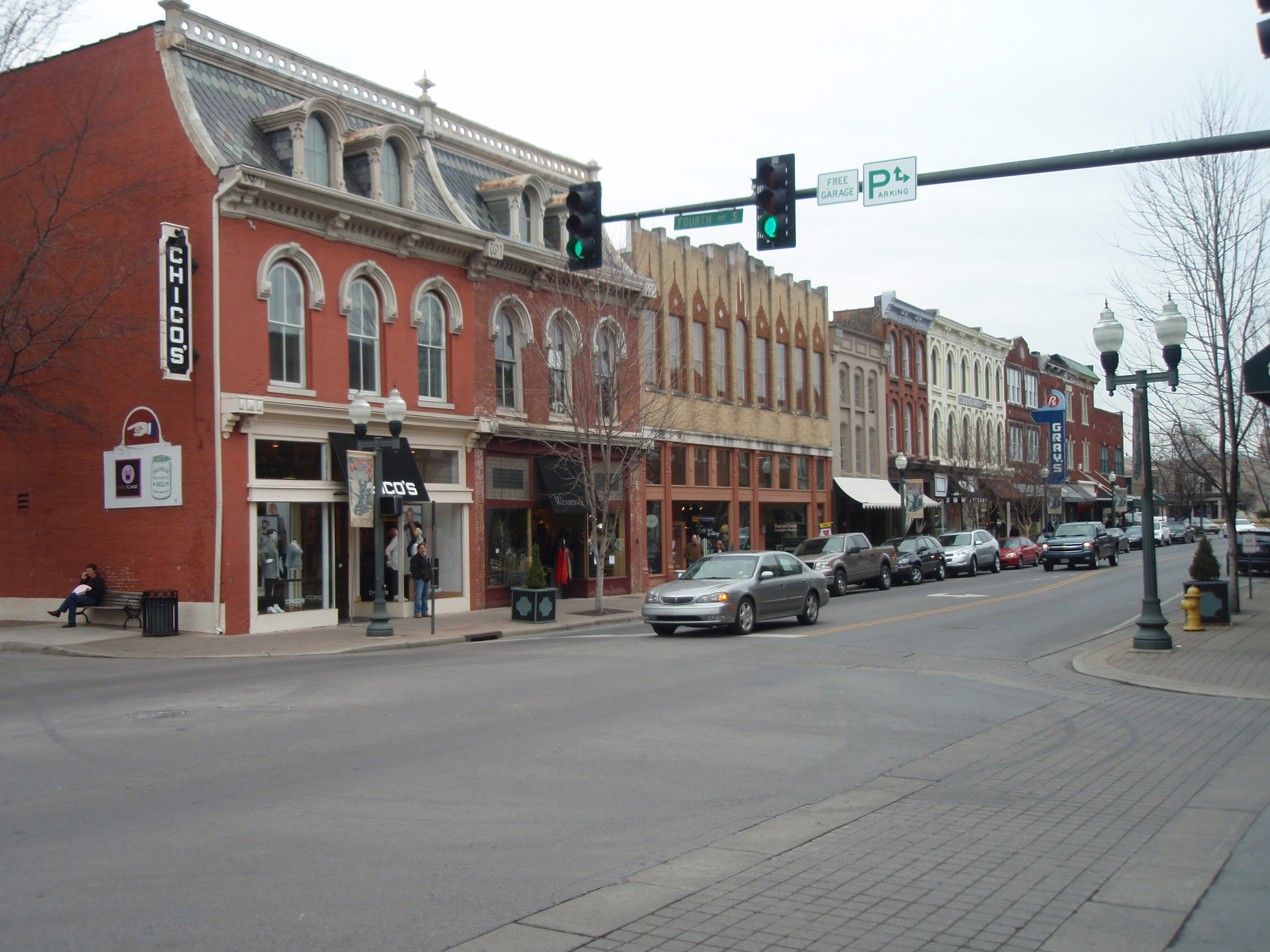
- Fourth Avenue in the Franklin Historic District

- Location within Tennessee Location within the United States
- Interactive map showing the location of Franklin Historic District
- Location: Centered around Main St. (TN 96) and 3rd Ave. (U.S. 31) (original); Third Ave. S between S. Margin St. and the RR (increase I); and 300 block of 4th Ave. S (increase II), in Franklin, Tennessee
- Coordinates: 35°55′30″N 86°52′9″W
- Area: 148 acres (60 ha)
- Architectural style: Gothic Revival, Federal, Queen Anne and Colonial Revival
- MPS: Williamson County MRA
- NRHP reference No.: 72001254 (original); 88000378 (increase 1); 00000232 (increase 2)

Significant dates
- Added to NRHP: October 5, 1972
- Boundary increases: April 13, 1988; March 15, 2000

Franklin Historic District is a historic district in Franklin, Tennessee that was listed on the National Register of Historic Places in 1972. It was created to preserve historic commercial and residential architecture in a 16-block area of the original, downtown Franklin around the north, west, and south of the town square.

The 140-acre (57 ha) area of the 1972-listed district includes two properties separately listed on the National Register, Winstead House and the Hiram Masonic Lodge No. 7 (which is also a U.S. National Historic Landmark). Architectural styles include Gothic Revival and Federal. When listed, the district included 211 contributing buildings and 65 non-contributing buildings, on an area of 140 acres (57 ha).

The boundaries of the district were increased in 1988 to add a 5.2-acre (2.1 ha) area. The increased area included 12 contributing buildings, one contributing structure and four non-contributing buildings, in architectural styles including Greek Revival, Italianate, and T-plan. The district was further increased in 2000 to add a 2.6-acre (1.1 ha) area including Queen Anne and Colonial Revival architecture. This increase included nine contributing buildings and two non-contributing buildings.

It includes the Williamson County Courthouse.

The Franklin historic district is one of five National Register historic districts in the city of Franklin. Four of these, including the Franklin historic district, are also designated as local historic districts by city ordinance, making them subject to design review. Franklin has seven local historic districts.

The first increase added a one-block area which includes 12 houses.

The second increase added nine contributing buildings.
