= MWV =

MWV may refer to:

- Madagascar World Voice, shortwave radio station in Mahajanga
- Man-wide vehicle, vehicle not much wider than a person
- Martin Werhand Verlag, German publishing house
- MeadWestvaco, American packaging company in Richmond, Virginia
- Mendelssohn-Werkverzeichnis, catalogue of the works of Felix Mendelssohn
- Mount Washington Valley, New Hampshire, United States
