= Winstead House (Franklin, Tennessee) =

Historic house in Tennessee, United States

- U.S. National Register of Historic Places
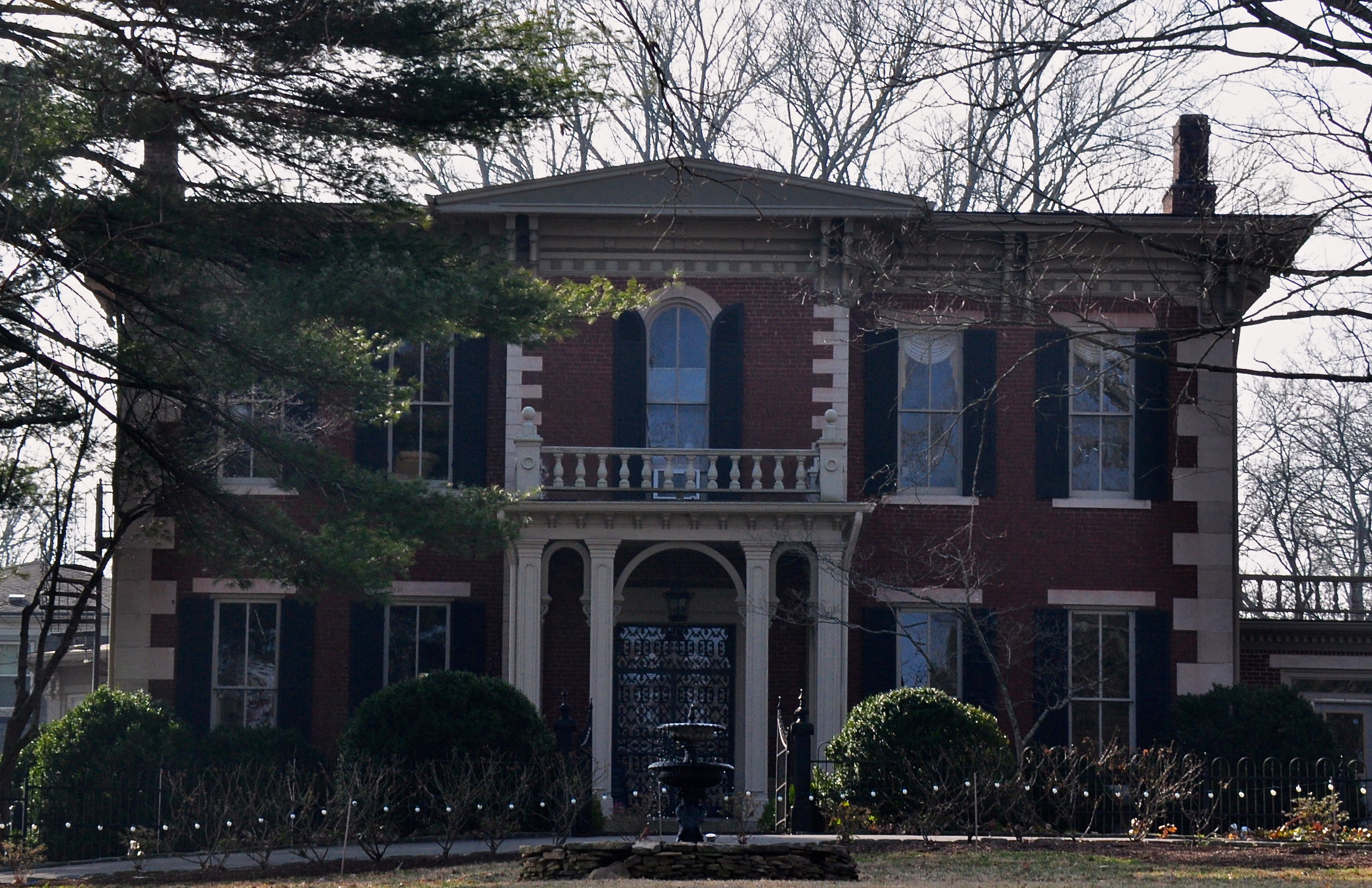
- The Winstead House, March 2014.

- Location within Tennessee Location within the United States
- Location: S. Margin St., Franklin, Tennessee
- Coordinates: 35°55′13″N 86°52′07″W
- Area: 3.7 acres (1.5 ha)
- Built: c.1870
- Built by: William O'Neal Perkins
- Architectural style: Italianate
- NRHP reference No.: 79002486
- Added to NRHP: April 18, 1979

Winstead House is a historic Italianate house in Franklin, Tennessee built c.1870 that was listed on the National Register of Historic Places in 1979 together with 3.7 acres (1.5 ha) of land. It is also a contributing property in the Franklin Historic District.

It was built by William O'Neal Perkins on the foundation of a former house, the McNutt House, which burned c.1865. Perkins used brick and stone materials from a building on the court square, Public Office, which he had bought and demolished. It is a two-story, five bay house. Its foundation, water table, and quoins are stone; the brick walls are laid in American common bond. It has a massive ornate cornice supported by heavy paired brackets.

It was owned by Asa Hickman Jewell, II and his wife, Margaret Loring Jewell.

It is now the administration building for the O'More College of Design.
