= Southern Stove Works, Manchester =

- U.S. National Register of Historic Places
- Virginia Landmarks Register
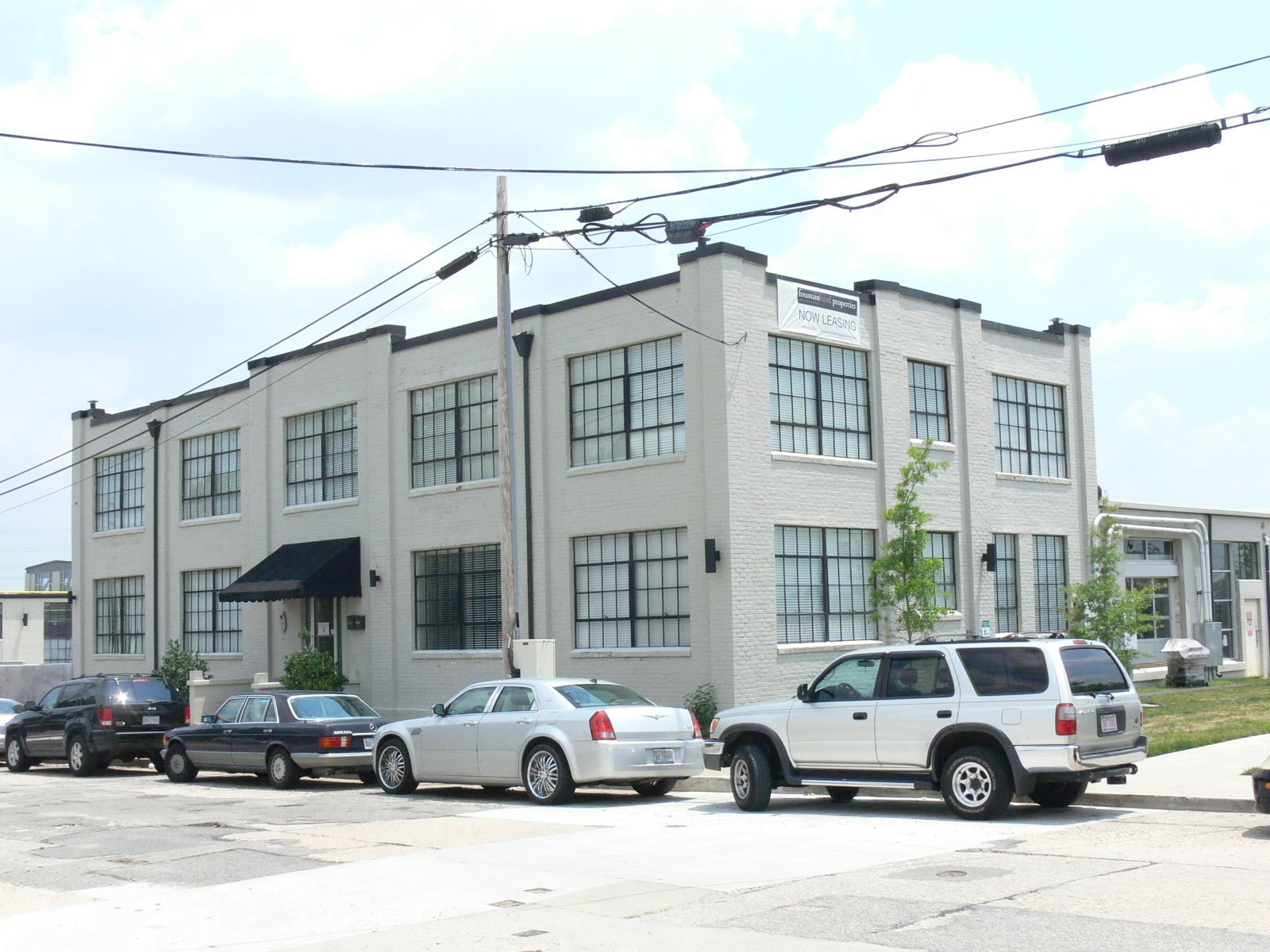
- Southern Stove Works, Manchester, July 2011

- Location within Virginia Location within the United States
- Location: 516-520 Dinwiddie Ave., Richmond, Virginia
- Coordinates: 37°31′4″N 77°25′57″W
- Area: 9.7 acres (3.9 ha)
- Built: 1920
- Built by: The Austin Company
- Architectural style: Modern Movement
- NRHP reference No.: 08000076
- VLR No.: 127-6193

Significant dates
- Added to NRHP: February 21, 2008
- Designated VLR: December 5, 2007

Southern Stove Works, Manchester is a historic factory complex located in Richmond, Virginia that replaced the company's original factory. The complex includes two contributing prefabricated steel frame buildings built in 1920. The west building contains the original two-story office building that has been connected by one-story infill to the long one-story warehouse building that contained the pressing and mounting departments and a three-part warehouse. The office is a five-by-three-bay, two-story, building measuring 40 by 80 feet (12 by 24 m) and brick curtain walls. The east building today consists of the foundry with attached original washrooms and office, charging room, and an expanded mill room.

It was listed on the National Register of Historic Places in 2008.
