= Southern Stove Works =

- U.S. National Register of Historic Places
- Virginia Landmarks Register
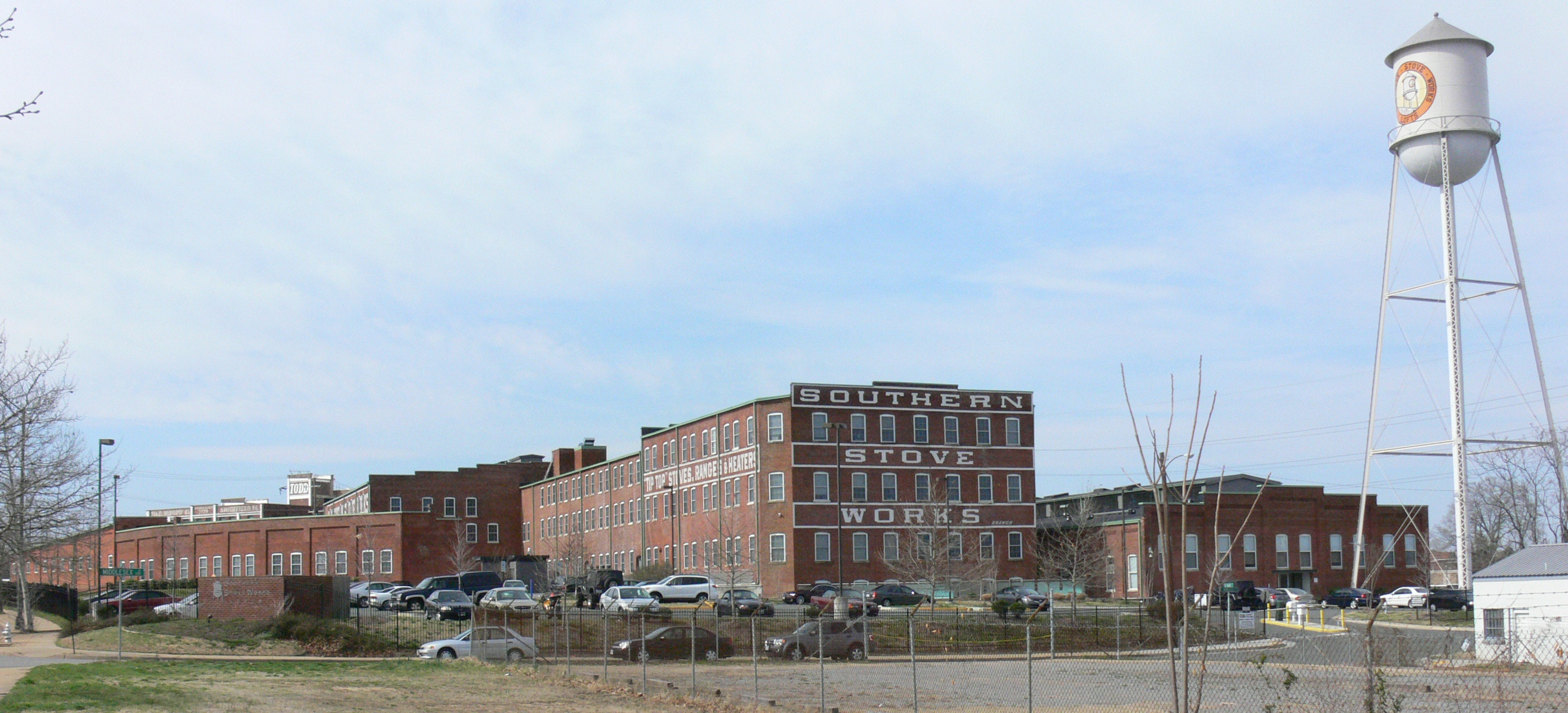
- Southern Stove Works, March 2011

- Location within Virginia Location within the United States
- Location: 1215 Hermitage Rd., Richmond, Virginia
- Coordinates: 37°33′41″N 77°27′34″W
- Area: 6.4 acres (2.6 ha)
- Built: 1902, 1905-1920
- NRHP reference No.: 05000480
- VLR No.: 127-6145

Significant dates
- Added to NRHP: May 26, 2005
- Designated VLR: March 16, 2005

Southern Stove Works is a historic factory complex located in the Three Corners District of Richmond, Virginia. The complex includes four contributing red brick buildings built between 1902 and 1920. The buildings housed the foundry, assembly operations, warehouse storage, and metal storage. In 1920, Southern Stove Works vacated the buildings and moved to their new facility, Southern Stove Works, Manchester. By 1921, these buildings were occupied by the J. P. Taylor Leaf Tobacco Company (later Universal Leaf Tobacco Company).

It was listed on the National Register of Historic Places in 2005. The building has been converted into loft-style apartments.

== See also ==
- Dortch Stove Works: NRHP-listed stove factory in Franklin, Tennessee
- Woods–Evertz Stove Company Historic District: NRHP-listed stove factory in Springfield, Missouri
