= Williamson College =

Private nondenominational Christian college in Franklin, Tennessee

- Former names: Williamson Christian College (1997–2013)
- Motto: Equipping Minds, Engaging Hearts, and Following Christ
- Type: Private college
- Established: 1997
- Accreditation: Association for Biblical Higher Education
- Affiliations: Evangelical Council For Financial Accountability
- Religious affiliation: Nondenominational Christian
- President: Ed Smith
- Academic staff: 2 full-time, 31 part-time
- Administrative staff: 12
- Students: 60
- Postgraduates: 9
- Location: Franklin, Tennessee, United States; 35.9562°N 86.8282°W
- Colors: Maroon and gold
- Nickname: Jaguars
- Website: Official website

Williamson College is a private nondenominational Christian college in Franklin, Tennessee. It was founded in 1997 as Williamson Christian College.

== History ==
Williamson Christian College was founded in 1997 by Kenneth Oosting. Oosting was the former dean of Milligan College and an educational business consultant. The college was named after Williamson County, where it is located. It has a focus on business, leadership, and ministry academics.

The college was initially incorporated with the Tennessee Secretary of State in December 1996, officially receiving approval from the Tennessee Higher Education Commission in April 1997, and classes starting in 1998. It first received accreditation in 2002. Oosting retired from his position as president in 2008. Stephen Higgins succeeded Oosting as President and retired in 2012. The current president of the college, Ed Smith, was sworn in on November 11, 2012.

For the college's 10th anniversary it hosted former Arkansas Governor and 2008 and 2016 presidential candidate Mike Huckabee to speak about the upcoming primaries and the importance of higher education.

In 2012, the college moved from its initial location to its current campus at 274 Mallory Station Road in the Cool Springs area of Franklin. The following year, the name of the school was changed to Williamson College.

In 2014, Williamson College began a program in partnership with the Williamson County Sheriffs Office to educate inmates in Williamson County jails.

A second campus was announced in Smyrna, Tennessee in 2018, to better serve Veterans, Nissan Smyrna Assembly Plant employees, and the surrounding communities.

== Academics ==
Williamson College offers studies in business, leadership, and ministry, and has undergraduate programs for both associate's and bachelor's degrees. The college also has multiple graduate programs for master's degrees in Organizational Leadership, an Entrepreneurial MBA, Theological Studies, and Worship Arts Leadership. Degrees are offered on campus and online.

Williamson College provides a class model in which each class meets one time per week for five weeks. This model was based on the Adult Learning MBA program at Trevecca Nazarene University, which Oosting developed before founding Williamson Christian College. These compact and accelerated courses allow both traditional and non-traditional students to earn their degree while still being a part of the workforce. This class model also allows for continuous enrollment, allowing for nine enrollment dates throughout the year.

=== Accreditation and affiliation ===
Williamson College is accredited by the Association for Biblical Higher Education (ABHE), which is recognized by the Council for Higher Education Accreditation. The college was accredited by the Transnational Association of Christian Colleges and Schools from 2002 to 2007 until it earned accreditation from ABHE. The college is authorized to grant degrees by the Tennessee Higher Education Commission. The college maintains its financial standards in accordance its membership in the Evangelical Council for Financial Accountability.

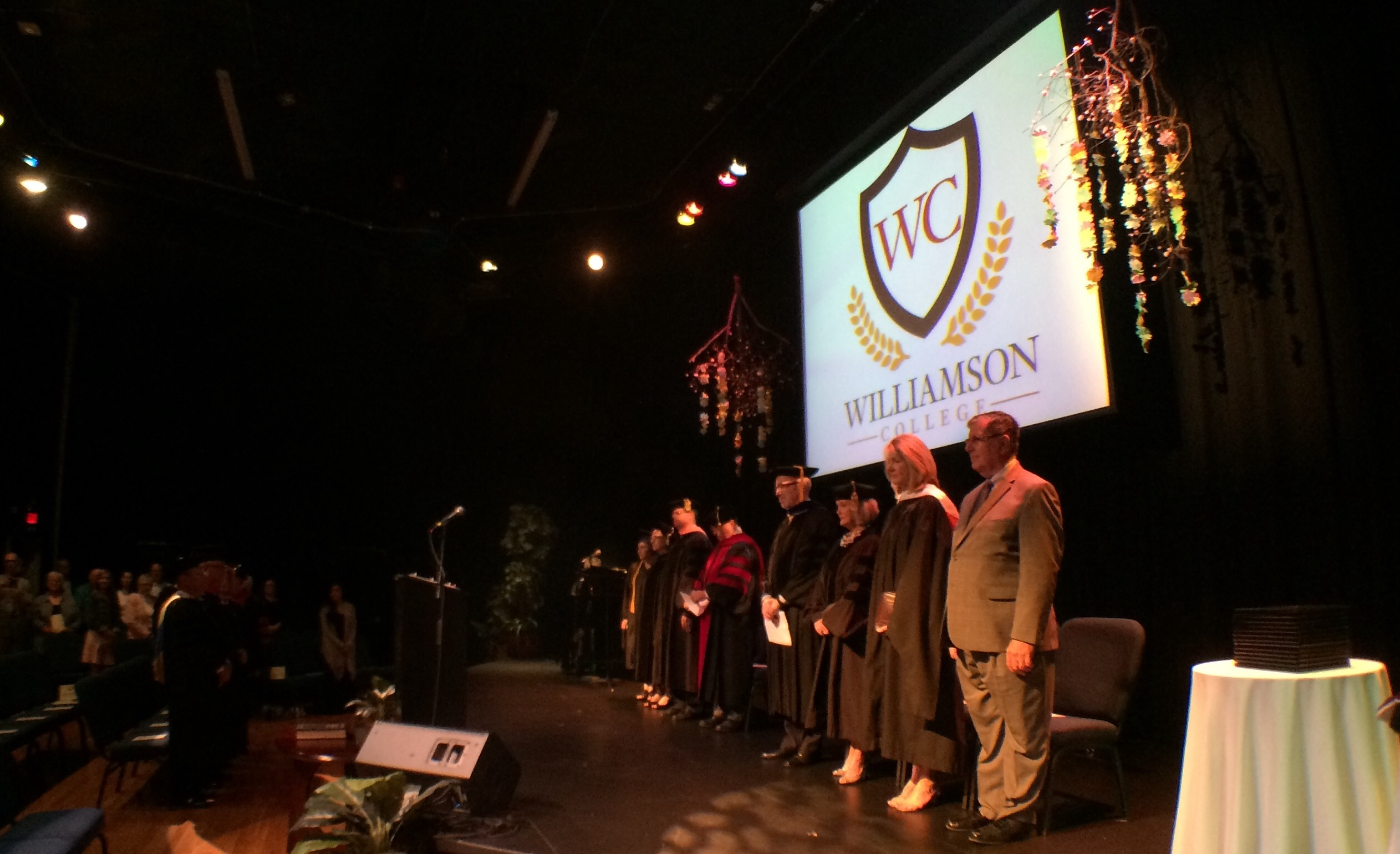
Williamson College 2016 Commencement Ceremony

Williamson College is a non-denominational Christian college and as such, holds no affiliation to any specific Christian denomination. It is guided by a 12-member board of trustees.
