= KNLS =

Shortwave radio station near Anchor Point, Alaska

Coordinates: 59.7483°N 151.7358°W

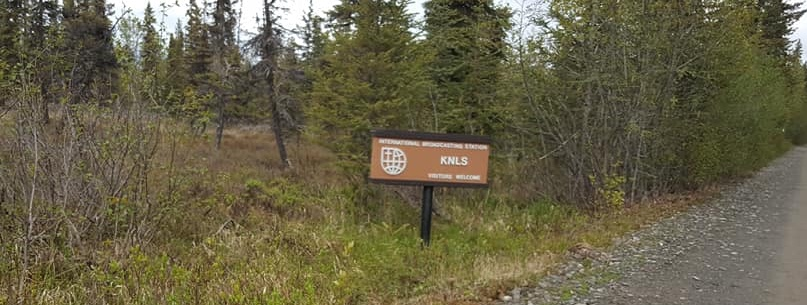
Welcome sign at KNLS compound

KNLS is an international shortwave radio station near Anchor Point, Alaska, United States. The station is operated by World Christian Broadcasting, a non-profit company based in the United States. KNLS broadcasts 20 hours a day of Christian-themed programming in Chinese, English and Russian.

== History ==
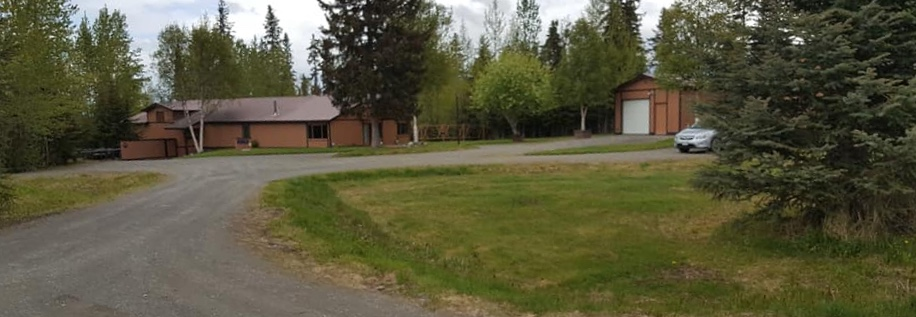
Offices of KNLS on Norman Lowell Road, outside of Anchor Point near the transmission towers.

The idea for KNLS came about during World War II, when Maurice Hall, a young Army Signal Corps officer, was involved in delivering shortwave radio transmitters to the Yalta Conference to keep President Franklin D. Roosevelt informed of news from Washington. Hall, a devout Christian, envisioned using shortwave radio to broadcast Christian programming worldwide. After the war, Hall pursued a career as a minister, educator, and missionary while nurturing his vision of an international shortwave station.

In 1976, the World Christian Broadcasting Corporation was formed and work began on making the station a reality. The following year, Lowell Perry, one of the founding directors, was killed in a plane crash during a mission to find a transmitter site. In 1979, land was purchased in Alaska and a transmitter was built.

KNLS commenced broadcasting on July 23, 1983, initially airing ten hours a day in Mandarin Chinese and Russian, later adding English programming. With the dissolution of the Soviet Union, listeners from former Soviet bloc countries began requesting religious materials, including Bibles. In 2005, a second transmitter was installed in Alaska.

Initially, contributors were located across the United States. However, in 1989, a new Programming Center was established in Franklin, Tennessee, featuring state-of-the-art recording studios and offices for permanent staff members. Writers from around the world now contribute to the broadcast schedule.

The organization has received responses from listeners in every country worldwide. In addition to the Alaska station, a new facility in Madagascar is being developed with three antennae to broadcast throughout Europe, Western Asia, the Middle East (in Arabic), Africa, India, and South America. Once operational in 2011, the station is expected to reach approximately eighty percent of the global population.

== KNLS today ==
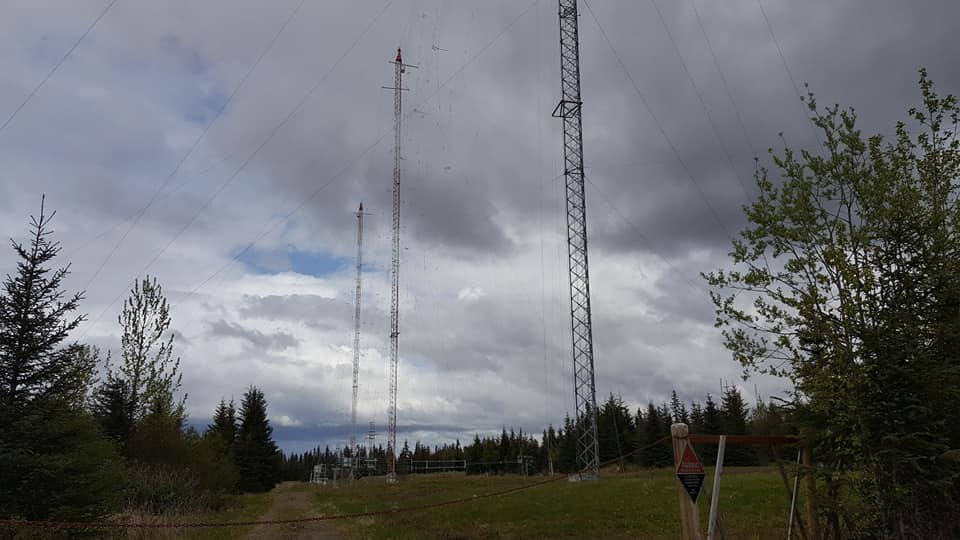
KNLS broadcast towers

KNLS broadcasts daily for ten hours in Mandarin, five hours in Russian, and five hours in English. The station's Operations Center in Franklin, Tennessee, near Nashville, produces the programming, which follows a magazine-style format featuring Bible teachings, religious segments, reports on life in America, and music.

Unlike many radio stations, KNLS does not solicit donations from its listeners. Instead, it is funded by contributions from individuals, churches, and other groups. Additionally, the station provides requested Bibles and other materials to listeners free of charge.

== Broadcasts ==
=== Chinese broadcast ===
Ed Ho is host for the Chinese hour and is assisted by contributors including Edward Short, Salina Ho and Shu-Mei Lee. Segments include Spiritual Stories, Daily Bread, Happy Family and an English tutorial, along with hymns.

=== Russian broadcast ===
Constantin Chernushenko, a physician by training, is host of the Russian broadcast. Features include Famous Russians, a spiritual biography series; Book of Books, a Bible teaching segment; Parables of Jesus; and feature reports from the worlds of science and entertainment and other topics of general interest. Contributors to the Russian broadcast include Marina Kabulova, Galina Koval, Igor Ponomarev.

=== English broadcast ===
Rob Scobey produces and co-hosts the English hour with Lucy Grant. Features include Author’s Journal, First Person and Profiles in Christian Music. Also on the English broadcast is a prayer lesson presented by evangelist Andy Baker, whose segment was heard by missionary Gracia Burnham during the time she was held captive by terrorist rebels in the Philippines. Burnham references the broadcast in her book, In the Presence of My Enemies.

== Bibliography ==
- “Broadcaster’s Dream Wins ACU Award.” Abilene Reporter-News, February 20, 1991
- Burnham, Gracia with Merrill, Dean. In the Presence of My Enemies. Wheaton, Illinois: Tyndale, 2003, pp. 255–256.
- “Indian Ocean Adventure” – World Christian Broadcasting brochure, 2008
