= Dortch Stove Works =

- U.S. National Register of Historic Places
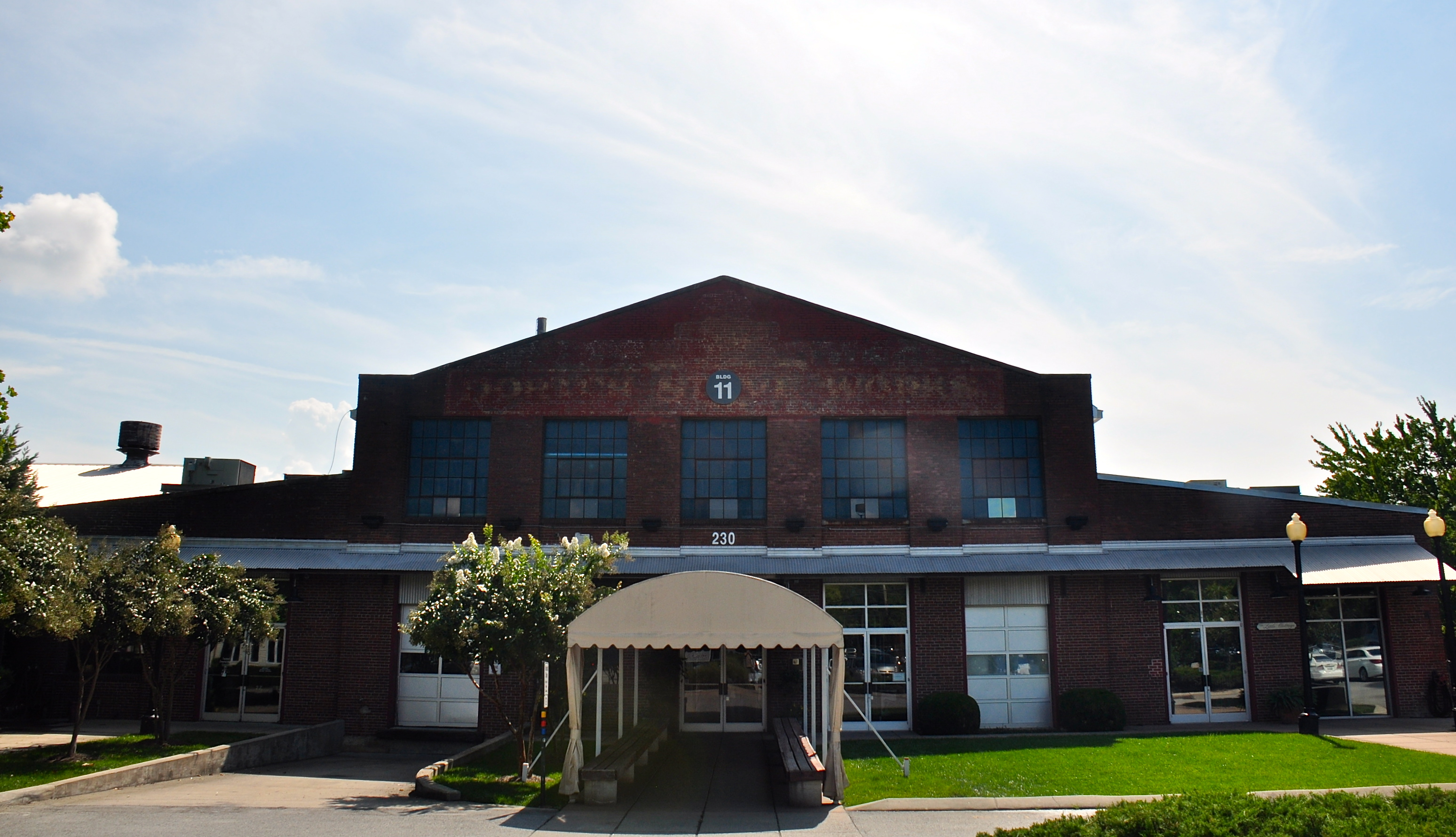
- Dortch Stove Works, September 2014

- Location within Tennessee Location within the United States
- Location: 230 N. Franklin Rd., Franklin, Tennessee
- Coordinates: 35°55′58″N 86°47′36″W
- Area: 30 acres (12 ha)
- Built: 1929
- Architect: Robert & Company
- Architectural style: Industrial
- NRHP reference No.: 97001438
- Added to NRHP: November 13, 1997

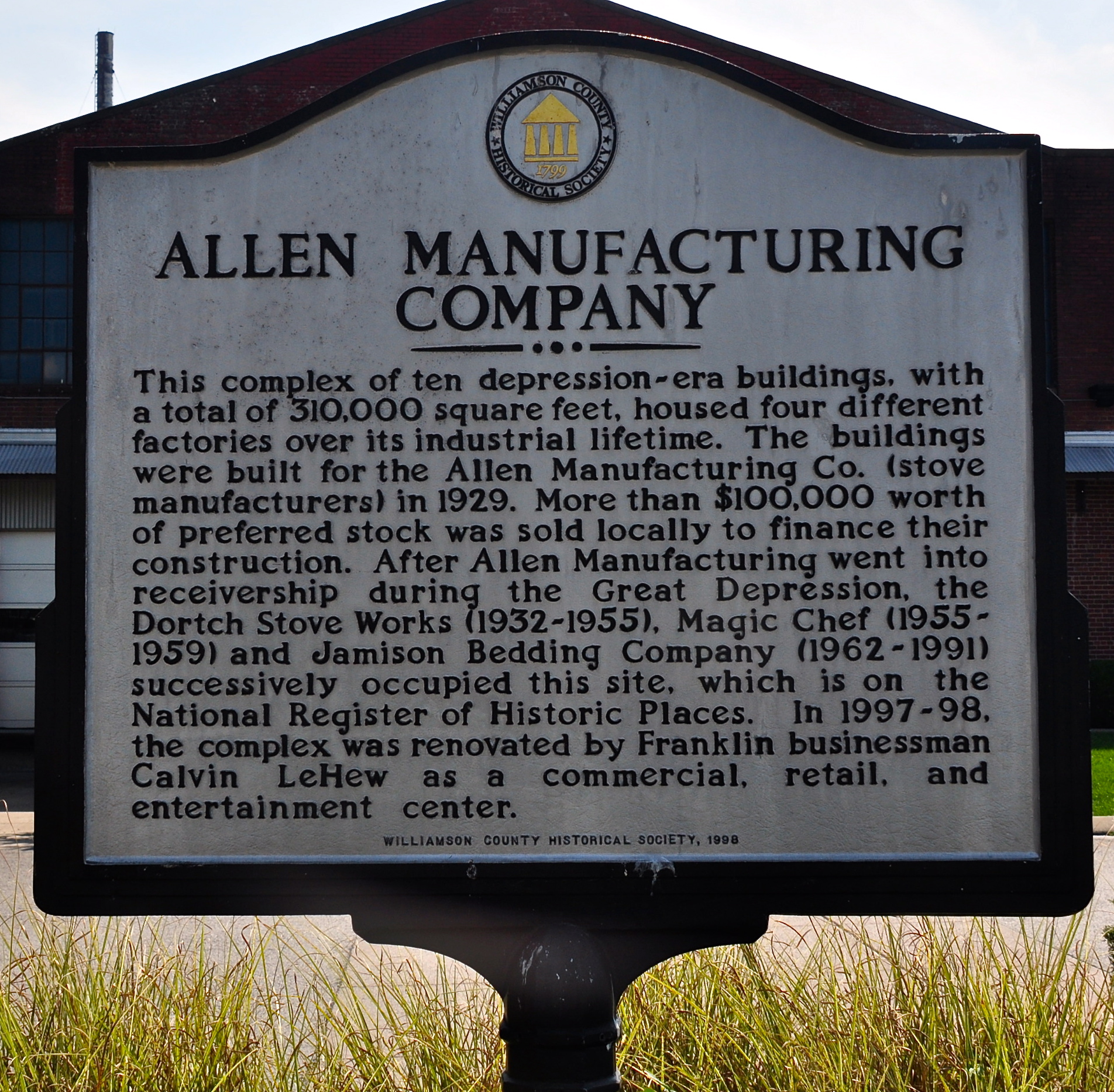
Williamson County Historical Society sign for Allen Manufacturing Company, also known as Dortch Stove Works

Dortch Stove Works is an historic stove manufacturing plant in Franklin, Tennessee. It was built in 1929 by Allen Manufacturing Company, then based in Nashville, Tennessee. During its manufacturing prime, the plant produced stoves and ranges under Allen Manufacturing Company, Dortch Stove Works, and Magic Chef, as well as bedding and furniture plant under Jamison Bedding Company. The plant is known as The Factory at Franklin, and operates as a mixed dining, retail, and entertainment center.

The property was listed on the National Register of Historic Places in 1997. When listed the property included five contributing buildings, one contributing structure, two non-contributing buildings, and one non-contributing structure, on 30 acres (12 ha).

== Description ==
The Dortch Stove Works plant is an industrial plant that was designed by Robert & Company of Atlanta in 1929. The main body of the plant consists of the large horseshoe shaped foundry, originally taking up around 245,000 square feet. To accommodate the intensive work involved in manufacturing, the foundry was built with immense stretches of unobstructed floor space, poured concrete floors, high ceilings, and rows of clerestory windows and skylights that were necessary for venting hot air from the building. Several additions were made by Dortch Stove Works between 1935 – 1940, as well as by Jamison Bedding Company in the early 1960s. Now, the open floor plan of the foundry has been converted into a mixed retail and dining center.

The plant also includes the original brick boiler room with a 1960s metal addition made by Jamison Bedding, as well as a spacious assembly room with a wood roof, wood support beams, and poured concrete flooring that was likely built between 1935 and 1940. Two buildings that were probably used for storage sit on the east end of the property and were likely built around the same time as the assembly room. The former front office building, now a restaurant, was built in 1929 with the rest of the foundry and renovated in 1997. Renovations included the addition of outdoor seating areas on the first and second floors.

The most prominent feature of Dortch Stove Works is its water tower. It stands at the front of the plant and has been repainted twice – once to a brick red in 1997, and then to a dark green in 2020.

The plant could be accessed by road, fronting Franklin Road (also known as U.S. Route 31, the Jackson Highway, and the Franklin and Nashville Highway), or by rail, fed by two spur tracks (no longer extant) that serviced the Louisville & Nashville Railroad and the Franklin Interurban Railway.

== History ==
=== Allen Manufacturing Company ===
Dortch Stove Works began as a stove manufacturing plant for Allen Manufacturing Company, then helmed by W. F. Allen. In the late 1920s, Nashville-based Allen Manufacturing Company decided to move its production to Franklin, citing a need for upgraded machinery and Franklin's appealing labor market. In 1929, Allen Manufacturing Company hired Robert & Company, an Atlanta architectural firm, to design their new plant. Construction began in October 1929 and finished in the spring of 1930. Limited production started as early as June 1930. The new plant was fully operational by February 12, 1931, and employed 250 people. At the height of production, Allen Manufacturing Company employed 300 people at their Franklin location, at least 75% of whom were locals, and could produce 65 stoves a day. Notable products of Allen Manufacturing Company were the Allen Parlor Furnace and Allen's Princess Range.

However, Allen Manufacturing did not remain in Franklin long. A combination of lawsuits, the high cost of construction, and the looming reality of the Great Depression resulted in Allen Manufacturing Company and the Allen Corporation (formed to sell stocks for the construction of the new plant), declaring bankruptcy in 1932. In late April, Allen Manufacturing Company entered receivership, naming Joe Briggs of the Williamson County Banking and Trust Company and Richard Herbert, the clerk and master of the Franklin chancery court, as the receivers.

=== Dortch Stove Works ===
The plant did not remain inactive long. In December 1932, O. L. Dortch, a prominent Tennessee businessman, purchased what was, at the time, one of the most modern stove manufacturing plants in the country. Dortch purchased the plant and most of the new machinery that Allen had installed for $60,000. In March 1933, Dortch Stove Works began operating out of the Franklin plant and quickly became the largest employer in Williamson County. At any given time throughout their 23 years in Franklin, Dortch Stove Works employed between 250-400 workers, reaching a peak of around 450 employees in 1949. O. L. Dortch also announced early in the process that he intended to hire locally as much as possible, encouraging potential employees to move to Franklin and advertising for housing for new employees in the local newspaper.

Dortch Stove Works drove the industrial and economic development of Franklin throughout its tenure. By December 1933, stoves had become the second largest export from Franklin behind flour, which was largely produced by Lillie Mill Flour Company, the county's oldest industry. Popular lines produced under Dortch were the Royal Line, the "Modern as Tomorrow" ranges, and the Pan-American. Throughout the Great Depression, Dortch helped to stabilize the economic landscape of Franklin and the greater Williamson County area by providing steady employment. Dortch was consistently the largest employer in Williamson County: in 1947 it was the only industry in Williamson County to employ 100 or more employees, and in 1949, with a peak of around 450 employees, Dortch was one of the country's largest stove works. The economic impact of Dortch Stove Works and its diversification of Franklin's agrarian economy aligned closely with the development of other towns across the South in the New South era.

=== Magic Chef ===
However, as technology evolved and electricity reached the countryside, the need for wood- and coal- burning stoves dropped. Households moved towards more modern electric appliances, and Dortch lacked diverse enough offerings to weather the drop in demand. In October 1955, it was announced that Dortch Stove Works would merge with Magic Chef Corporation of St. Louis, Missouri. Magic Chef produced a wide range of electric and gas appliances, as well as products like large signs and emblems that were made for Coca-Cola. By 1956, Magic Chef had moved the entirety of its domestic gas range production to Franklin. Ownership of the company changed hands twice during its time in Franklin, once in August 1957 to Food Giant Markets of Los Angeles, and again in October 1958 to Dixie Products Inc., of Cleveland, Tennessee. In 1958, in a bid to keep the industry from moving operations to Cleveland, the city of Franklin purchased the plant and offered to lease the property to Magic Chef at a more affordable rate. Magic Chef continued to operate out of Franklin until January 1961, at which point a recession in market appliances led to the closing of the plant. The city of Franklin was concerned about the loss of the industry and the potential impact it would have on other manufacturing powers in the area.

=== Jamison Bedding Company ===
Five months later, Nashville-based Jamison Bedding Company announced plans to expand into Franklin and solved the problem of the city's idle plant. Jamison leased the property from the city and modified the stove manufacturing plant for the production of upholstered furniture. Under Jamison, the plant continued to be a major source of employment in Franklin and the greater Williamson County area. Jamison operated out of the Franklin plant until 1991, and with 30 years of manufacturing was the longest running tenant at the plant. In 1991, Jamison's production moved to Tupelo, Mississippi. While Jamison maintained a few offices on the property until 1995, the rest of the plant sat dormant until 1996.

=== Adaptive reuse ===
In 1995, the city began accepting design ideas for the redevelopment of the site. By the summer of 1996, a plan for the adaptive reuse of the site that had been submitted by local businessman Calvin LeHew was accepted. Local news reported that he intended to rehabilitate the plant and convert it into a retail and entertainment center. Renovations on the property, to be known as The Factory at Franklin, began in 1997, with the first businesses opening in January 1998. Completion of the renovation was officially announced on January 18, 2005. During this time, the Factory was home to over 70 tenants.

In 2012, the plant was sold to billionaire Brad Kelley, who operated the Factory for nine years, until it was sold to Holladay Properties in 2021[8]. Today, the Factory operates as a mixed retail, dining, and entertainment space.

== Historic status ==
On November 13, 1997, Dortch Stove Works was entered in the National Register of Historic Places. The listing included nine buildings and structures, six contributing and three non-contributing. The plant was listed under Criteria A for its significance to the commercial and industrial development of Franklin. At the time of its entrance to the National Register, Dortch Stove Works was also entered into the Tennessee Register of Historic Places.

== Gallery ==
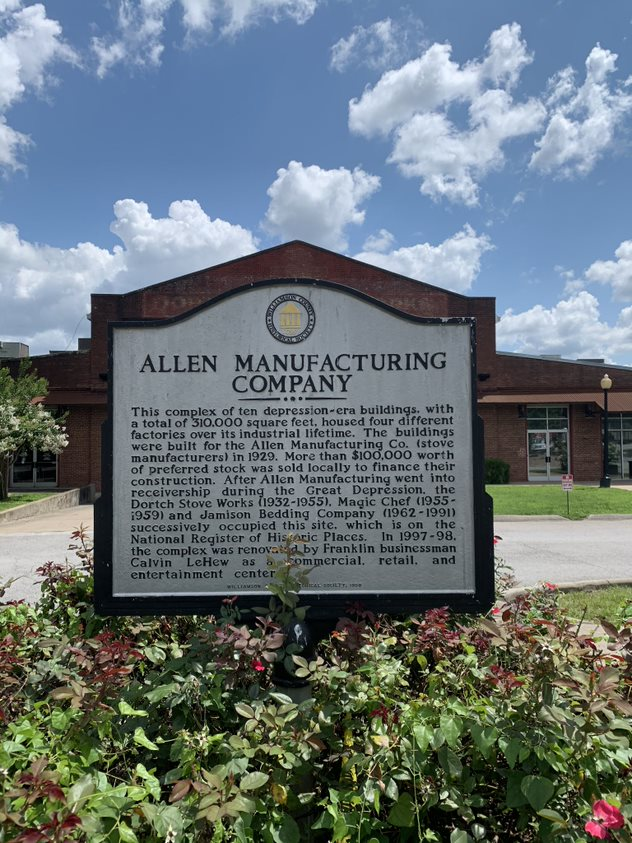
Williamson County Historical Society sign.

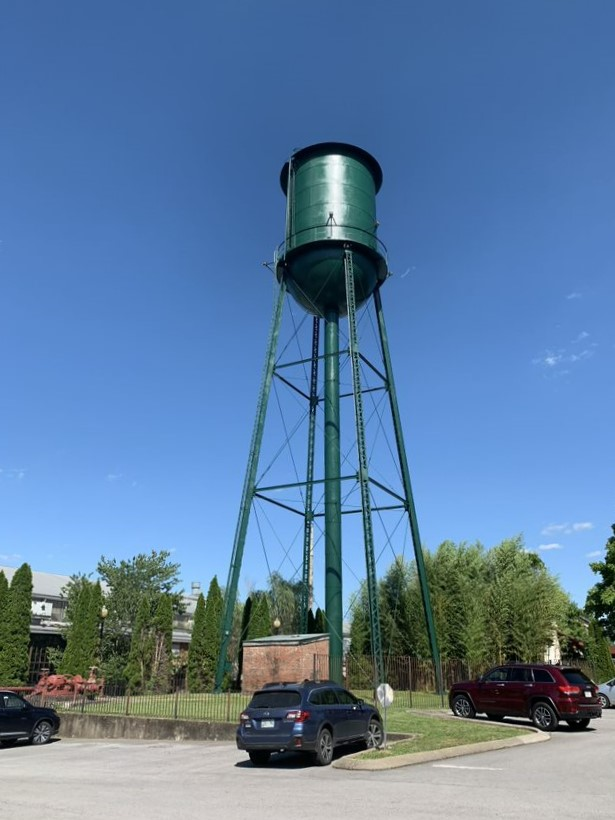
The water tower at Dortch Stove Works, painted green

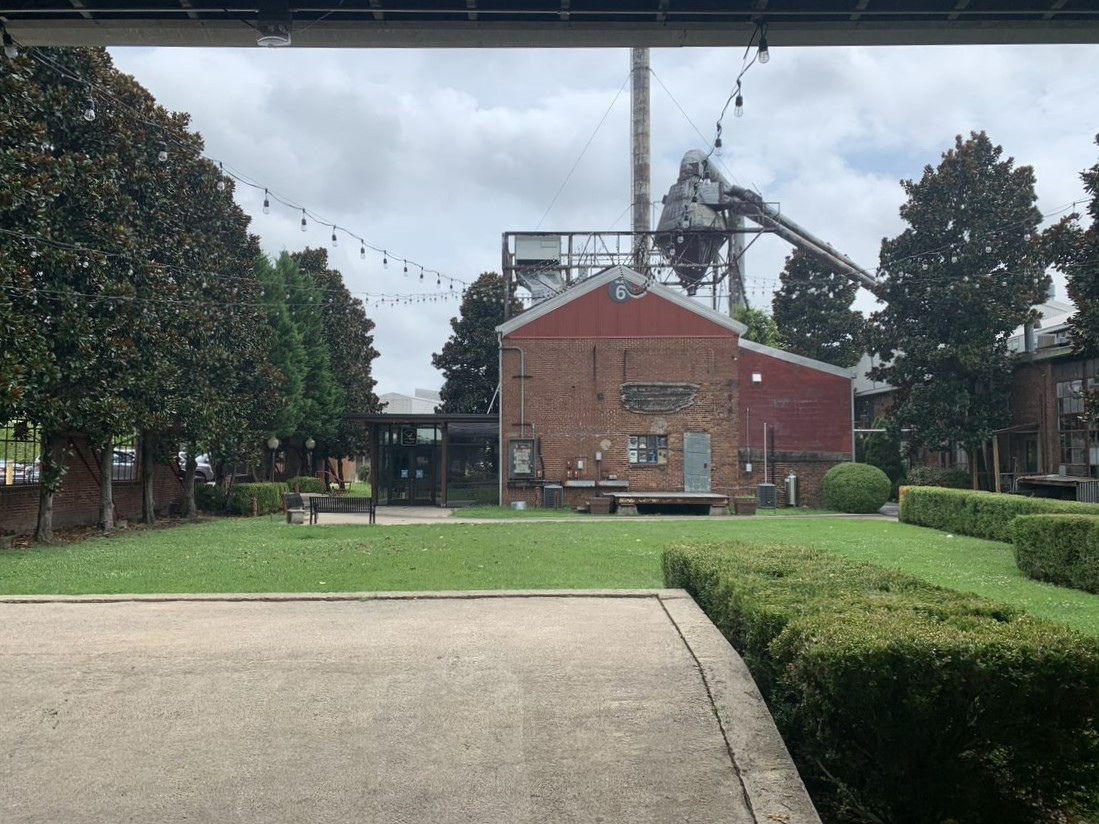
View of the old boiler room, now the Mockingbird Theater

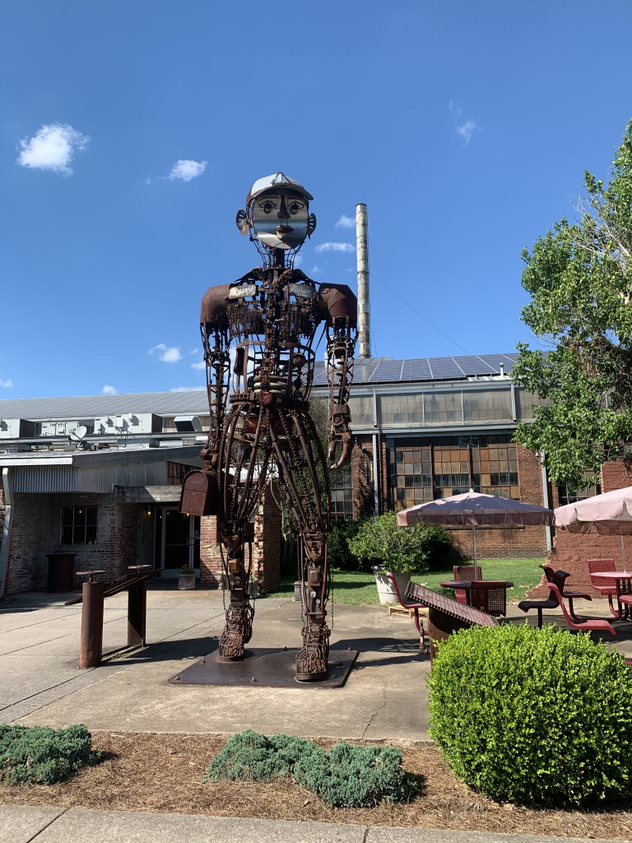
Rusty, the recycled factory man

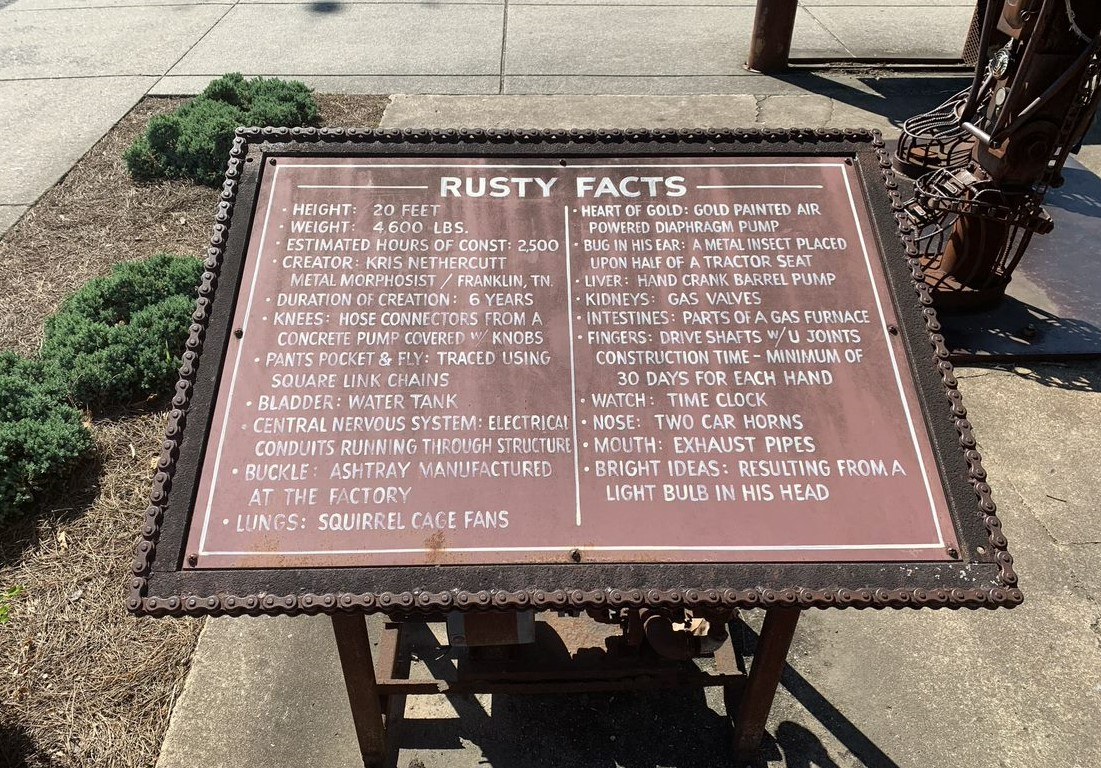
Plaque for Rusty

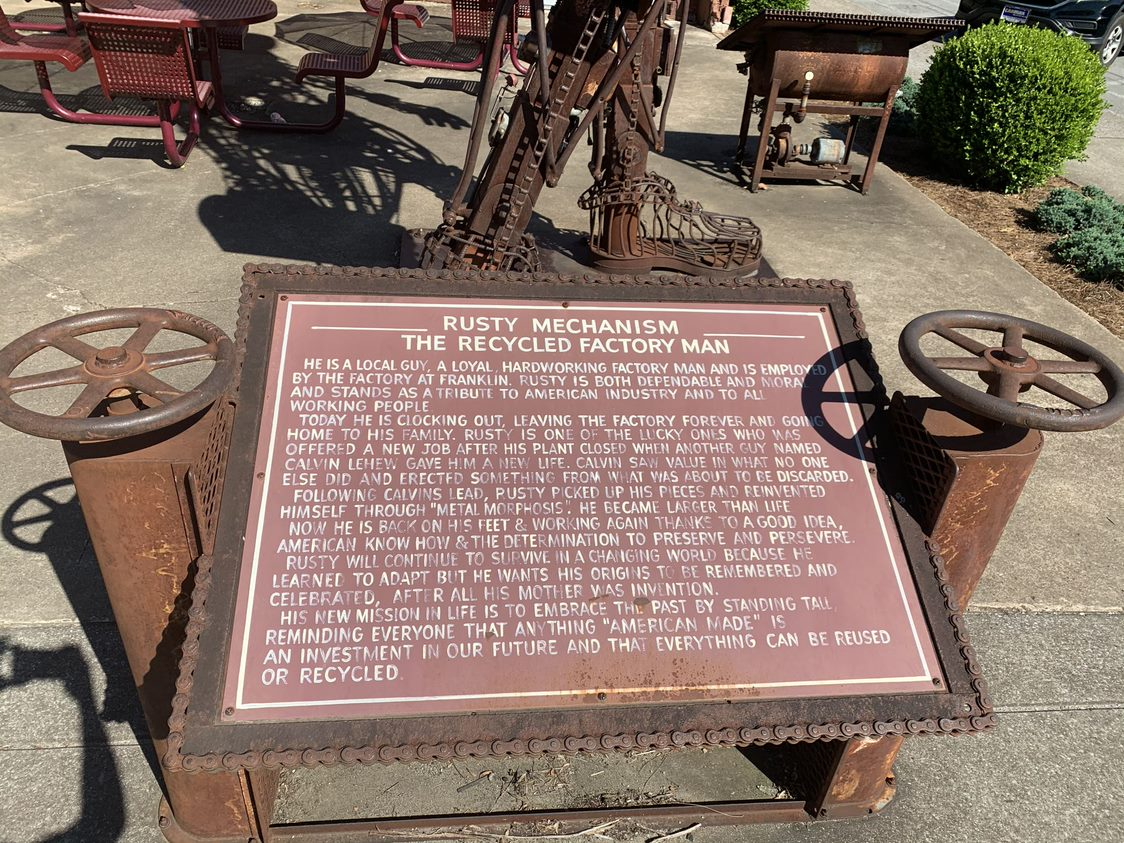
Second plaque for Rusty

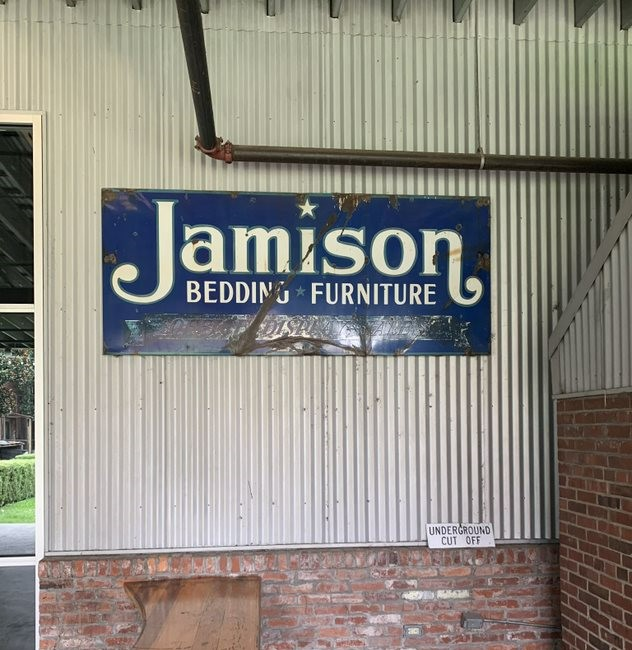
Jamison Bedding Company sign

== See also ==
- Southern Stove Works: NRHP-listed stove factory in Richmond, Virginia
- Woods–Evertz Stove Company Historic District: NRHP-listed stove factory in Springfield, Missouri
- Borden Powdered Milk Plant - Fayetteville, TN
- Harlinsdale Farm
- National Register of Historic Places listings in Tennessee
- National Register of Historic Places listings in Williamson County, Tennessee
- Adaptive Reuse
- Industrial Heritage
- TICCIH - The International Committee for the Conservation of the Industrial Heritage
