= Tennessee and Alabama Railroad Freight Depot =

Historic building in Franklin, Tennessee

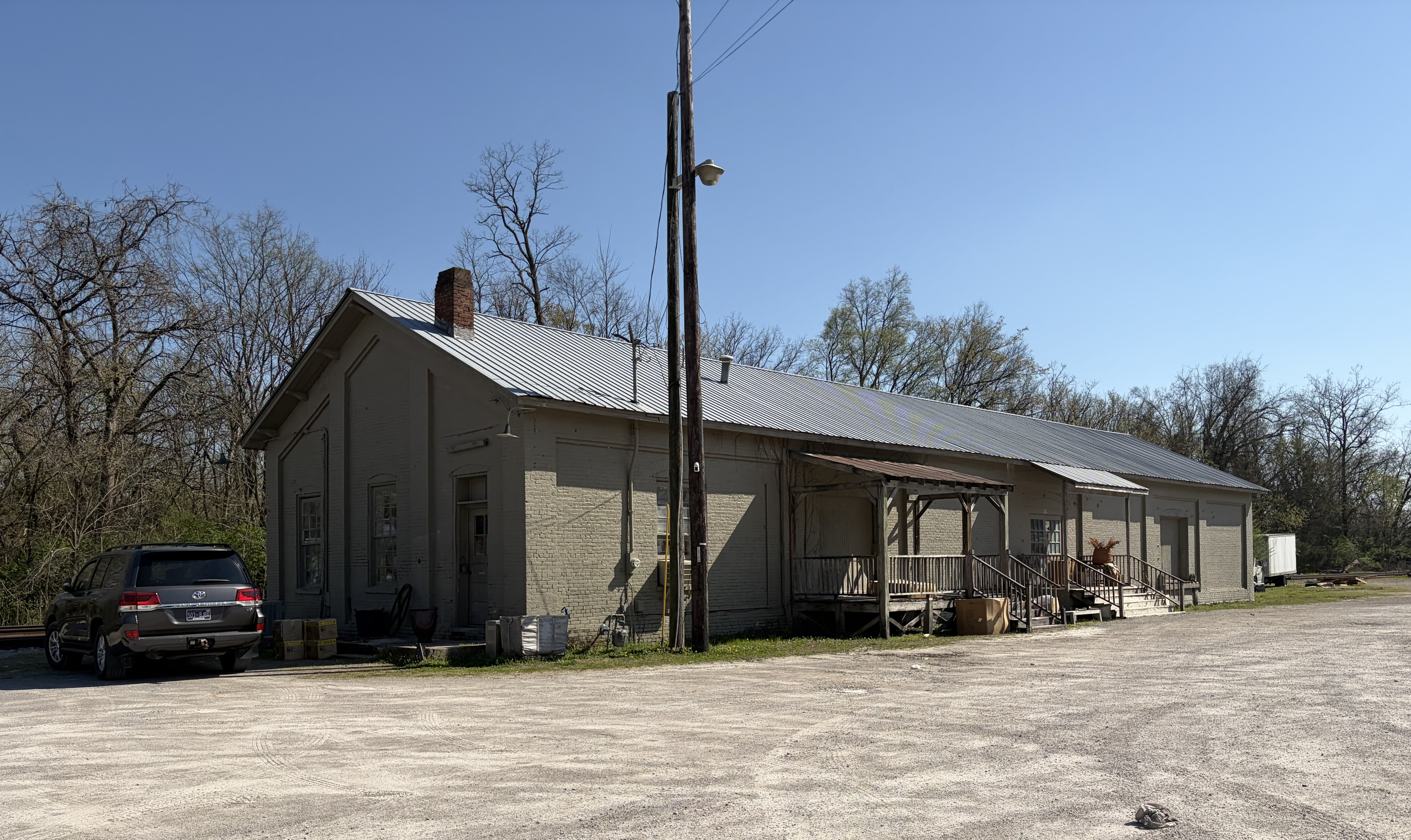
The former Tennessee and Alabama Railroad Freight Depot in downtown Franklin

The Tennessee and Alabama Railroad Freight Depot is a former railroad depot dating from c.1858 in Franklin, Tennessee that was evaluated for its historic merit and deemed eligible for listing in the National Register of Historic Places in 2000. It was not however listed due to owner objection. It has also been known as the Louisville and Nashville Railroad Freight Depot. Its NRHP reference number for the evaluation was 00000231.

The depot included Italianate architecture. The property's NRHP eligibility is addressed in a 1988 study of Williamson County historical resources.
