= Lynching of Jim Taylor =

African American man who was lynched in the U.S.

- Location: Murfreesboro Road, Franklin, Tennessee, U.S.
- Date: April 29, 1891
- Attack type: Lynching

Jim Taylor was an African-American man who was lynched on April 30, 1891, in Franklin, Tennessee.

== Lynching ==
Jim Taylor was an African American man who lived and worked as a sharecropper on a farm owned by James Hodge, two miles from Franklin. He was described as "a very large negro", who was "feared by his own race and regarded as desperate" by The Daily American, and as "a dangerous character" by The Leaf-Chronicle.

On April 29, 1891, a circus troupe with many African Americans was in Franklin. Taylor went to Franklin and reportedly shot a circus artist named Morrellton. A policeman named Charles Cook tried to arrest him, and Taylor reportedly shot him in the neck. Taylor was arrested. He reportedly carried two guns and a knife. He was taken to the Williamson County Jail in Franklin.

At 10p.m., a mob entered the jail and dragged him out of his cell. They took him to the bridge on Murfreesboro Road (near modern-day Pinkerton Park), where they hanged him and riddled his body with bullets. The mob, who were on horseback, left shortly after, and Taylor's body was found the next morning.

The lynchers were identified and were sent to 10 years in prison .
