= Woods–Evertz Stove Company Historic District =

Historic district in Missouri, United States

- U.S. National Register of Historic Places
- U.S. Historic district
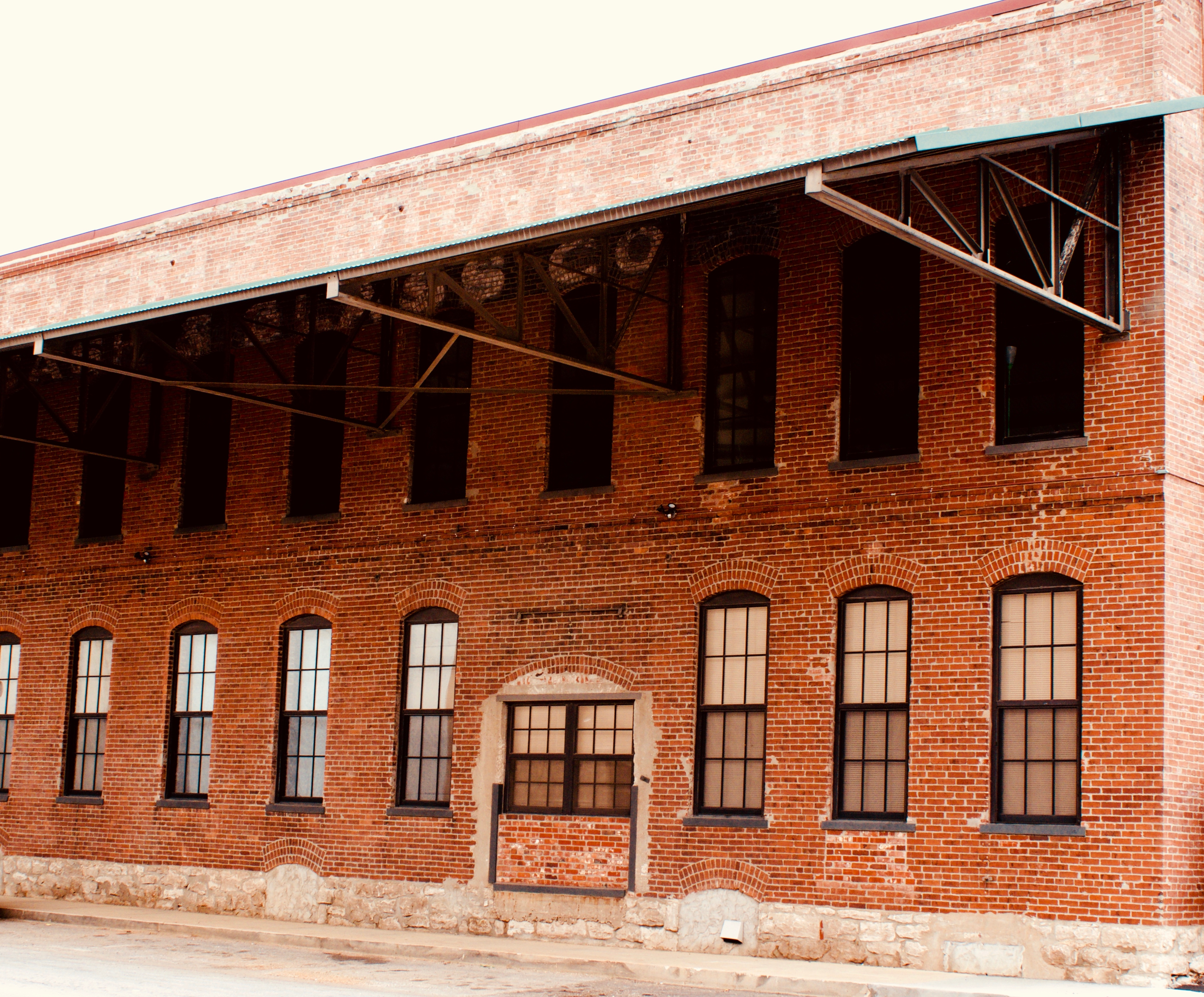

- Location within Missouri Location within the United States
- Location: Area bounded by N. Jefferson Ave., E Phelps St., N. Robberson Ave. and E. Tampa St., Springfield, Missouri
- Coordinates: 37°12′55″N 93°17′26″W
- Area: 3.2 acres (1.3 ha)
- Built: 1904
- Architectural style: Factory
- NRHP reference No.: 03001071
- Added to NRHP: October 23, 2003

Woods–Evertz Stove Company Historic District, also known as General Wesco Stove Company, is a historic industrial complex and national historic district located at Springfield, Greene County, Missouri. The district encompasses six contributing buildings associated with a large cast iron stove manufacturer. The district developed between about 1904 and 1953, and all six buildings are in a simple industrial, factory style, with minimal architectural embellishment and have flat, low-pitch and gabled roofs.

It was added to the National Register of Historic Places in 2003.

== See also ==
- Dortch Stove Works: NRHP-listed stove factory in Franklin, Tennessee
- Southern Stove Works: NRHP-listed stove factory in Richmond, Virginia
