= Confederate Monument (Franklin, Tennessee) =

Monument in Franklin, Tennessee, United States

- Chip
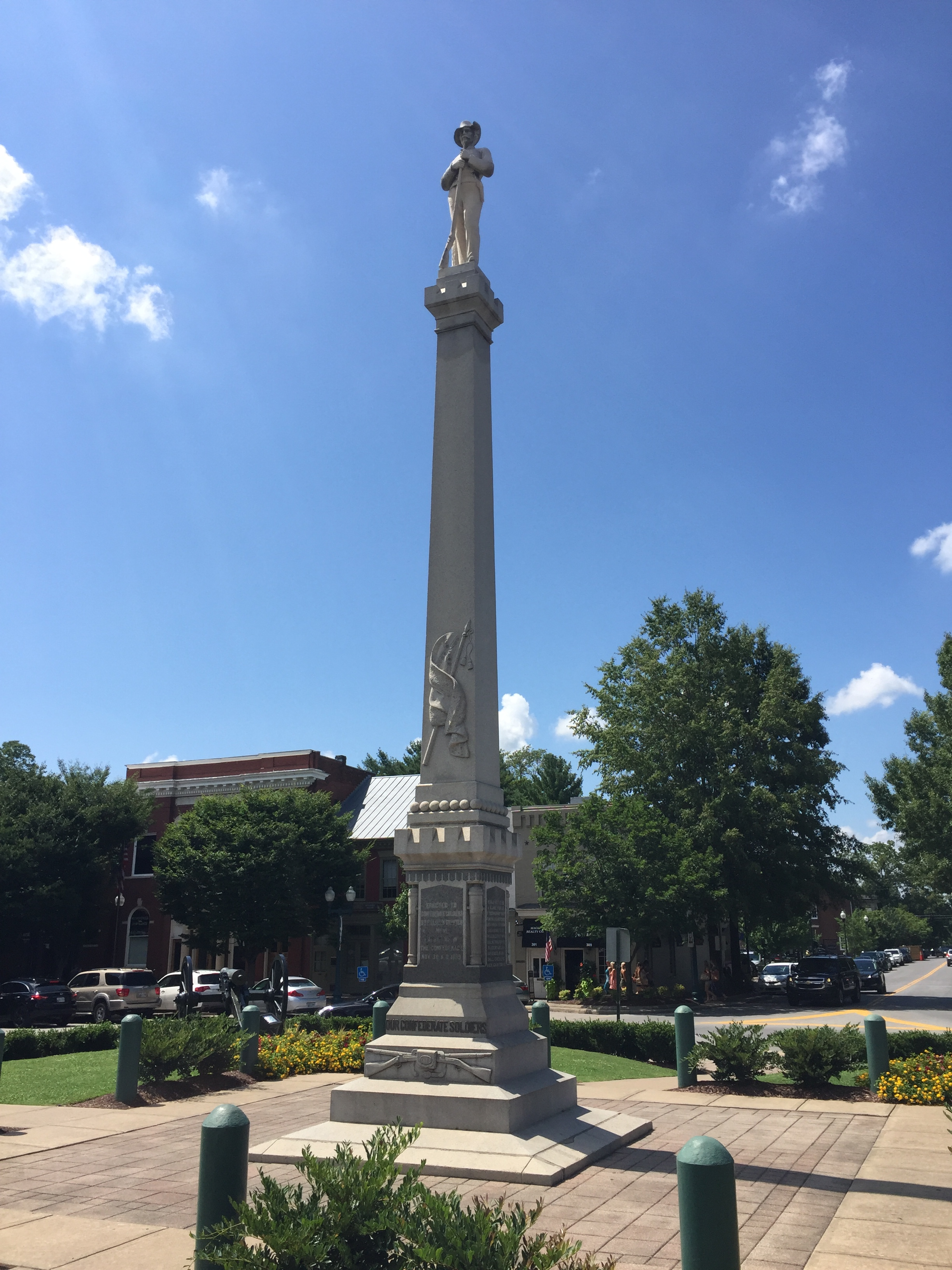
- The Confederate Monument in 2016
- Year: 1899
- Medium: Italian marble
- Location: Williamson County Courthouse, Franklin, Tennessee
- 35°55′31″N 86°52′08″W
- Owner: United Daughters of the Confederacy

The Confederate Monument, also known as Chip, or Our Confederate Soldiers, is located on the grounds of the Williamson County Courthouse in the county seat - Franklin, Tennessee, United States. Installed in 1899, it is an Italian marble statue portraying a single Confederate soldier atop a tall column and base. The Battle of Franklin took place here during the American Civil War, and was won by the Union.

== History ==
=== Dedication ===
The monument includes a 6 ft. 6 in.-tall Italian marble sculpture of a Confederate soldier shown at parade rest, on top of a tall column and base of granite and marble, which together are approximately 37 ft. 8 in. tall. The whole monument cost "nearly $2,700" to create in the late 1890s. It was dedicated by the local chapter of the United Daughters of the Confederacy on November 30, 1899. Confederate General George Gordon attended the dedication, as did the widows and children of Brigadier General John Adams, and Tennessee Governor Benton McMillin. The flag of the 32nd Tennessee Infantry Regiment was raised; The Tennessean noted that it had not been flown in Franklin since 1861.

Chapters of the UDC had developed across the South in the late 19th century, when the women were instrumental in getting Confederate cemeteries funded and organized, and in conducting the work of documenting and commemorating Confederate contributions. UDC members wrote memoirs and textbooks in addition to raising funds for monuments.

=== Restorations ===
The monument was restored by the City of Franklin at a cost of $750 in 1980. The city restored it again in 2010. At the time, Mayor John Schroer opined, "This is an important piece of the city of Franklin."

=== Call for its removal ===
On August 17, 2017 a petition was circulated calling for its removal. Another petition to keep the monument was also started. Both petitions had thousands of signatures by late August. Eric Stuckey, Franklin's city administrator, said the Tennessee Heritage Protection Act prevented the city from removing the monument without the consent of the Tennessee Historical Commission. As of May 2021, the issue is in litigation.

== Description ==
The monument's inscription reads:

“ERECTED TO / CONFEDERATE SOLDIERS / BY FRANKLIN CHAPTER / NO. 14 / DAUGHTERS OF / THE CONFEDERACY / NOV. 30, A.D. 1899” “ IN HONOR AND MEMORY / OF OUR HEROES / BOTH PRIVATE AND CHIEF / OF THE / SOUTHERN CONFEDERACY. / NO COUNTRY EVER HAD / TRUER SONS, / NO CAUSE / NOBLER CHAMPIONS, / NO PEOPLE / BOLDER DEFENDERS / THAN THE BRAVE SOLDIERS / TO WHOSE MEMORY / THIS STONE IS ERECTED.” “WOULD IT BE / A BLAME FOR US / IF THEIR MEMORY PART / FROM OUR LAND AND HEARTS / AND A WRONG TO THEM / AND A SHAME TO US. / THE GLORIES THEY WON / SHALL NOT WANE FROM US. / IN LEGEND AND LAY, OUR HEROES IN GRAY / SHALL EVER LIVE / OVER AGAIN FOR US.” “WE WHO SAW AND KNEW THEM WELL / ARE WITNESSES / TO COMING AGES / OF THEIR VALOR / AND FIDELITY. / TRIED AND TRUE. GLORY DROWNED / 1861-1865

The monument contains a USGS survey marker noting that in 1931 it was 648.82L Ft. above sea level.
