= World Christian Broadcasting =

US non-profit organization

World Christian Broadcasting is a non-profit Christian organization that operates international shortwave radio shortwave stations. The station's transmitters are in Alaska and the Indian Ocean, and all of its programs are produced at the company headquarters and broadcast operations center in Franklin, Tennessee, a suburb of Nashville.

== History ==
Although World Christian Broadcasting was formed in 1976, the idea came about 30 years earlier when Army Signal Corps officer Maurice Hall prepared shortwave transmitters for the Yalta Conference for use by President Franklin D. Roosevelt and his staff so they could keep up with news from Washington. Hall began to realize that if shortwave radio could transmit political news across long distances, it could also broadcast Gospel messages to large parts of the world.

Dr. Lowell G. Perry, a communications professor at Abilene Christian University, served as the first president of World Christian Broadcasting. In 1977, Perry died in a plane crash as he and others sought a location for the station's transmitter. Two years later, a site in Alaska was selected and construction began.

KNLS signed on the air July 23, 1983, broadcasting ten hours a day in Mandarin Chinese and Russian and reaching roughly one-third of the world. English broadcasts were added later. As the Soviet Union's empire fell apart, listeners from those countries began writing and requesting Bibles and other religious materials. In 2005, the station signed on a second 100 KW antenna in Alaska.

In 1991, World Christian Broadcasting presented a program called "The Reflection Hour" from Moscow over Russia's All-Union Radio network. The program reached all 15 republics of the former Soviet Union.

In 2016, a new station, MWV, was launched in the Indian Ocean. From this station, with its three 100 KW transmitters, all seven languages are broadcast.

== Programming ==
World Christian Broadcasting's approach to programming is different from many religious broadcasters. There is no preaching or regular minister on the programs. Most of the hour is filled with popular music, news commentary, health and family tips, travelogues, and other family-friendly programming. Interspersed throughout the hour are teaching segments with Gospel messages or Biblical topics. Most of the air staff are journalists or broadcasters by training. Programs are culturally sensitive and geared toward a secular audience, although Christian listeners may also enjoy the content. Some segments focus on hymns but most of the music is secular and is checked for lyrical content so that it is wholesome and positive. Every hour also includes an announcement encouraging listeners to write for their very own copy of the Bible.

World Christian Broadcasting never asks listeners to send money to support the stations. World Christian Broadcasting is funded by interested individuals, churches and other groups. Also, the Bibles and other materials that listeners can request are sent free of charge.

KNLS, in Alaska, and MWV, in Madagascar, are currently on the air a total of 36 hours each day with programs in English, Russian, Chinese, Arabic, Portuguese, Spanish, and English designed for our African audience. All programming is produced at the station's Operations Center in a suburb of Nashville, Tennessee. Programs are presented in a magazine-style format and provide Bible and religious teaching segments and reports about life in America as well as music. The station receives messages each month via email and postal mail from all over the world.

== Current stations ==
World Christian Broadcasting's current stations are in Anchor Point, Alaska, and on an island in the Indian Ocean. Each day programs are broadcast in English, Russian, Chinese, Arabic, Spanish, Portuguese, and English with an African accent.

== Leadership ==
Following Perry's death in 1976, Dr. B.E. Davis became president of World Christian Broadcasting. He was succeeded in 1980 by Dr. Robert E. Scott, who led the company for 13 years. In 1993, Charles H. Caudill was appointed as World Christian Broadcasting's fourth president and chief executive officer. In January, 2018, Andy Baker became the fifth president of World Christian Broadcasting. Dr. Gayle Crowe is Vice President of Programming, and Ben C. Powell serves as Chief Financial Officer.

World Christian Broadcasting is overseen by a board of directors who serve on a volunteer basis.
