= Franklin, Tennessee =

- City
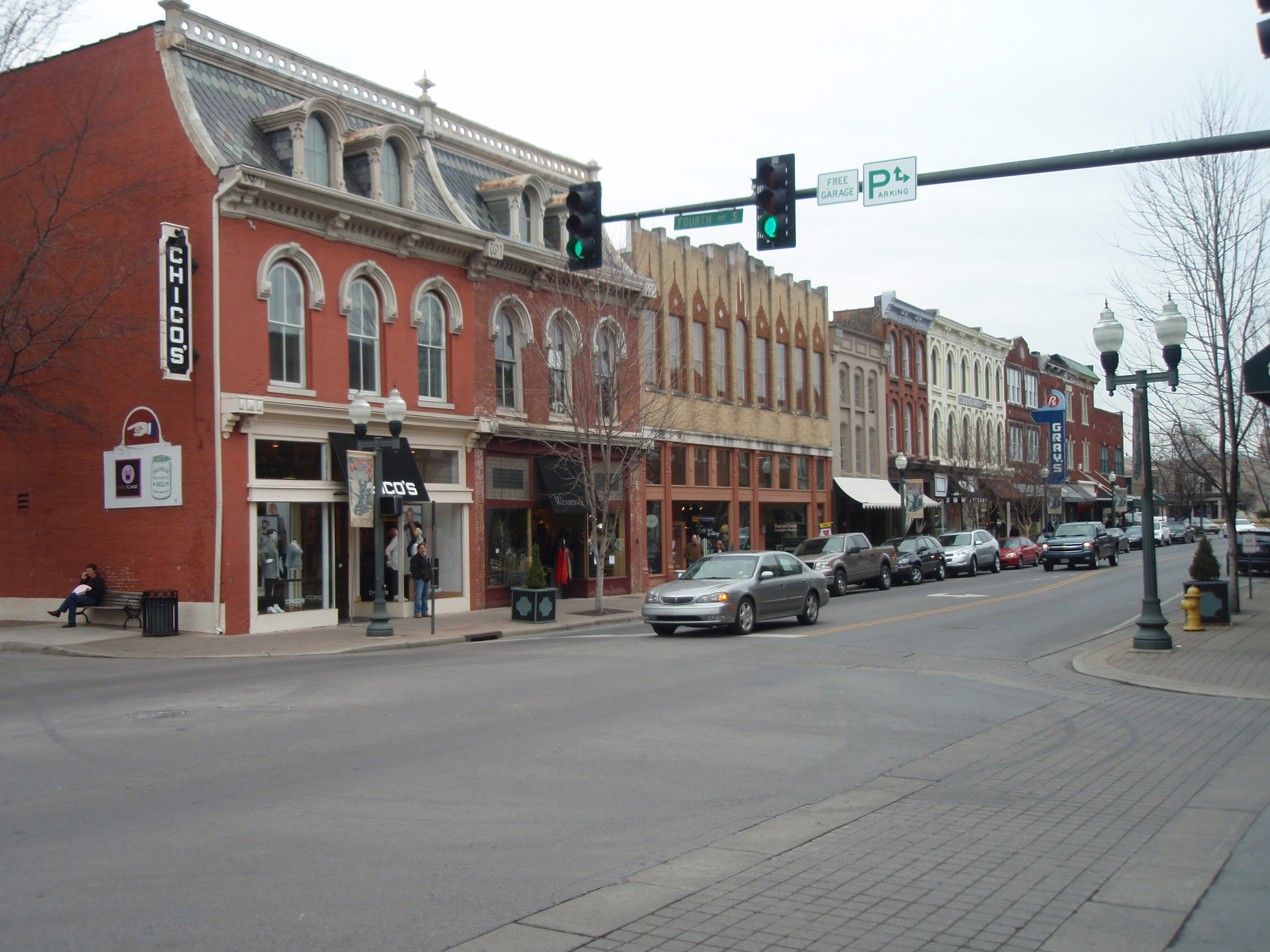
- Historic Downtown Franklin

- Flag Seal

- Location within Williamson County and Tennessee

- Location within Tennessee Location within the United States
- Coordinates: 35°55′45″N 86°51′27″W
- Country: United States
- State: Tennessee
- County: Williamson

Government
  - Mayor: Ken Moore
  - City Administrator: Eric Stuckey

Area
  - Total: 44.73 sq mi (115.86 km^{2})
  - Land: 44.52 sq mi (115.31 km^{2})
  - Water: 0.21 sq mi (0.55 km^{2})
- Elevation: 643 ft (196 m)

Population (2020)
  - Total: 83,454
  - Estimate (2024): 89,142 ▲
  - Rank: 7th in Tennessee
  - Density: 1,874.5/sq mi (723.74/km^{2})
- Time zone: UTC-6 (CST)
  - Summer (DST): UTC-5 (CDT)
- ZIP Codes: 37064, 37065, 37067, 37068, 37069
- Area codes: 615 and 629
- FIPS code: 47-27740
- GNIS ID: 1284816
- Website: www.franklintn.gov

Franklin is a city in and the county seat of Williamson County, Tennessee, United States. About 21 miles (34 km) south of Nashville, it is one of the principal cities of the Nashville metropolitan area and Middle Tennessee. As of 2020, its population was 83,454. It is the seventh-most populous city in Tennessee.

The city developed on both sides of the Harpeth River, a tributary of the Cumberland River. In the 19th century, Franklin (as the county seat) was the trading and judicial center for primarily rural Williamson County and remained so well into the 20th century as the county remained rural and agricultural in nature.

Since 1980, areas of northern Franklin have been developed for residential and related businesses, in addition to modern service industries. The population has increased rapidly as growth moved in all directions from the core. Despite recent growth and development, Franklin is noted for its many older buildings and neighborhoods, which are protected by city ordinances.

== History ==
The area was home to seven Native American tribes.

=== 18th century ===
The City of Franklin was founded October 26, 1799, by Abram Maury Jr. (1766–1825). Later a state senator, he is buried with his family in the current Founders Pointe neighborhood. Maury named the town after national founding father Benjamin Franklin.

Ewen Cameron built a log house in 1798, the first in the new settlement. Cameron was born February 23, 1768, in Bogallan, Ferintosh, Scotland. He emigrated to Virginia in 1785 and came to Tennessee shortly after it was admitted to the Union. Cameron died on February 28, 1846, after living 48 years in the same house. He and his second wife, Mary, were buried in the old City Cemetery.

=== 19th century ===
This area is part of Middle Tennessee, and farmers prospered in the pre-Civil War years, with the cultivation of tobacco and hemp as commodity crops, and raising of livestock.

During the Civil War, Tennessee was occupied by Union troops from 1862. Franklin was the site of a major battle in the Franklin–Nashville Campaign. The Second Battle of Franklin was fought on November 30, 1864, resulting in almost 10,000 casualties (killed, wounded, captured, and missing). Forty-four buildings were temporarily converted to use as field hospitals. The Carter, Carnton, and the Lotz houses from this era are still standing and are among the city's numerous examples of period architecture.

After the Civil War, slavery was abolished and the franchise was extended to African-American men. Most joined the Republican Party, which had gained their freedom.

On July 6, 1867, a political rally of Union League African American Republicans in Franklin was disrupted by Conservatives, who were mostly White but included some Blacks. Later that evening, what became known as the "Franklin Riot" broke out. Black Union League men were ambushed by Whites at the town square and returned fire. An estimated 25 to 39 men were wounded, most of them Black. One White man was killed outright, and at least three Black people died of wounds soon after the confrontation.

On August 15, 1868, in Franklin, Samuel Bierfield became the first Jewish man to be lynched in the United States. He was fatally shot by a large group of masked men believed to be Ku Klux Klan (KKK) members. They attacked him for treating Blacks equally to Whites in his store. Lawerence Bowman, a Black man who worked for Bierfield and was with him at his store, was fatally wounded in the attack and soon died.

After the Reconstruction era, white violence continued against African Americans, as the minority struggled to retain dominance. Violence increased toward the turn of the century, and whites used intimidation and attacks to keep Blacks away from voting.

Five African Americans were lynched in Williamson County from 1877 to 1950, most during the decades around the turn of the century. It was a time of high social tensions and legal racial oppression in the South. These murders took place in Franklin, when men were taken from the courthouse or county jail by mobs before trial.

Among them was Amos Miller, a 23-year-old Black man who was forcibly taken from the courtroom by a White mob during his 1888 trial in a sexual assault case. He was hanged from the railings of the balcony of the county courthouse. The alleged victim was a 50-year-old woman. On April 30, 1891, Jim Taylor, another African-American man, was lynched on Murfreesboro Road in Franklin by another mob, accused of killing a White man.

A memorial to Confederate soldiers was erected in 1899 by fourteen women of the United Daughters of the Confederacy to honor Confederate soldiers, including the 6,125 casualties of the Battle of Franklin. A news report described how as the last piece of the statue was being raised, a buggy ran into a rope, causing the statue to swing into the shaft, breaking out a piece from the hat of the figure. This event resulted in many nicknaming the monument as "Chip".

=== 20th century to present ===
Population growth slowed noticeably from 1910 to 1940 (see table in Demographics section), as many African Americans left the area in the Great Migration to northern industrial cities for jobs and to escape Jim Crow conditions.

Since the late 20th century, however, Franklin has rapidly developed as a suburb of Nashville, Tennessee. Franklin's population has increased more than fivefold since 1980, when its population was 12,407. In 2010, the city had a population of 62,487. As of 2017 Census estimates, it is the state's seventh-largest city. In 2017, the City of Franklin was ranked the 8th fastest-growing city in the nation by the U.S. Census Bureau, increasing 4.9 percent between July 1, 2016, and July 1, 2017.

==== Historic preservation and memorials ====
One of the first major manufacturers to establish operations in the county was the Dortch Stove Works, which opened a factory in Franklin in 1928. The factory was later developed as a Magic Chef factory, producing electric and gas ranges; Magic Chef was prominent in the Midwest from 1929. When the factory was closed due to extensive restructuring in the industry, the building fell into disuse. The factory complex was restored in the late 1990s adapted for offices, restaurants, retail and event spaces. It is considered a "model historic preservation adaptive reuse project".

After the passage of the National Historic Preservation Act of 1966, some Franklin residents have worked to identify and preserve its most significant historic assets. Five historic districts are listed on the National Register of Historic Places, as are many individual non-historic but older structures.

Historic preservation and church leaders developed the "Fuller Story", a project to recognize the lives and contributions of African Americans to Franklin. In October 2021 a statue of a soldier of the United States Colored Troops was installed in front of the old Williamson County Courthouse on Franklin Square. It marks the contributions of thousands of African Americans in ending the Civil War and reuniting the Union. The square was the site of a former slave market and it holds the Confederate monument.

The "Fuller Story" project was approved by the Franklin Board Of Mayor and Aldermen. Before the statue was erected, in 2018, the first of several planned historic plaques was installed; these mark the history of slavery, the Reconstruction era and Jim Crow, and civil rights in Franklin.

Franklin is home to an armed forces memorial, on the grounds of the Williamson County Archives. It honors Williamson County men who served in American wars from the Creek War to the Gulf War. Around the seal of Franklin are placed engraved bricks that radiate in a circle. The largest brick is in honor of George Jordan, an African-American man and former slave. As a Buffalo Soldier, he fought in the Indian Wars in New Mexico. He is the only man from Williamson County to receive the Congressional Medal of Honor.

== Geography ==
According to the United States Census Bureau, the city has a total area of 41.4 square miles (107.3 km^{2}), of which 41.2 square miles (106.8 km^{2}) is land and 0.2 square miles (0.6 km^{2}), or 0.52%, is covered by water.

=== Climate ===
Climate data for Franklin (Franklin Sewage Plant), Tennessee (1991–2020 normals, extremes 1893–present)
Month	Jan	Feb	Mar	Apr	May	Jun	Jul	Aug	Sep	Oct	Nov	Dec	Year
Record high °F (°C)	78 (26)	83 (28)	93 (34)	94 (34)	96 (36)	108 (42)	108 (42)	106 (41)	107 (42)	96 (36)	88 (31)	91 (33)	108 (42)
Mean maximum °F (°C)	66.9 (19.4)	71.8 (22.1)	78.1 (25.6)	83.7 (28.7)	88.1 (31.2)	93.4 (34.1)	96.1 (35.6)	95.8 (35.4)	92.8 (33.8)	85.3 (29.6)	76.9 (24.9)	68.7 (20.4)	97.7 (36.5)
Mean daily maximum °F (°C)	49.1 (9.5)	53.4 (11.9)	62.2 (16.8)	71.9 (22.2)	79.5 (26.4)	87.3 (30.7)	90.8 (32.7)	90.2 (32.3)	84.8 (29.3)	73.8 (23.2)	61.6 (16.4)	52.5 (11.4)	71.4 (21.9)
Daily mean °F (°C)	38.9 (3.8)	42.3 (5.7)	50.0 (10.0)	59.0 (15.0)	67.4 (19.7)	75.8 (24.3)	79.7 (26.5)	78.5 (25.8)	72.3 (22.4)	60.5 (15.8)	49.4 (9.7)	42.1 (5.6)	59.7 (15.4)
Mean daily minimum °F (°C)	28.6 (−1.9)	31.1 (−0.5)	37.8 (3.2)	46.2 (7.9)	55.4 (13.0)	64.3 (17.9)	68.5 (20.3)	66.9 (19.4)	59.8 (15.4)	47.2 (8.4)	37.1 (2.8)	31.8 (−0.1)	47.9 (8.8)
Mean minimum °F (°C)	10.4 (−12.0)	14.0 (−10.0)	20.9 (−6.2)	30.4 (−0.9)	40.4 (4.7)	53.0 (11.7)	59.3 (15.2)	57.3 (14.1)	44.8 (7.1)	31.6 (−0.2)	22.0 (−5.6)	16.4 (−8.7)	7.9 (−13.4)
Record low °F (°C)	−22 (−30)	−15 (−26)	0 (−18)	21 (−6)	30 (−1)	39 (4)	43 (6)	41 (5)	30 (−1)	21 (−6)	−3 (−19)	−11 (−24)	−22 (−30)
Average precipitation inches (mm)	4.25 (108)	4.76 (121)	5.16 (131)	5.16 (131)	5.39 (137)	4.39 (112)	4.57 (116)	3.61 (92)	4.00 (102)	3.47 (88)	3.83 (97)	5.20 (132)	53.79 (1,366)
Average snowfall inches (cm)	0.9 (2.3)	0.3 (0.76)	0.4 (1.0)	0.0 (0.0)	0.0 (0.0)	0.0 (0.0)	0.0 (0.0)	0.0 (0.0)	0.0 (0.0)	0.0 (0.0)	0.0 (0.0)	0.1 (0.25)	1.7 (4.3)
Average precipitation days (≥ 0.01 in)	11.9	11.2	12.7	11.1	12.3	11.2	10.6	9.0	8.4	9.1	10.0	12.2	129.7
Average snowy days (≥ 0.1 in)	0.5	0.3	0.3	0.0	0.0	0.0	0.0	0.0	0.0	0.0	0.0	0.2	1.3
Source: NOAA

== Demographics ==
Historical population
Census	Pop.	Note	%±
1870	1,552		—
1880	1,632		5.2%
1890	2,250		37.9%
1900	2,180		−3.1%
1910	2,924		34.1%
1920	3,123		6.8%
1930	3,377		8.1%
1940	4,120		22.0%
1950	5,475		32.9%
1960	6,977		27.4%
1970	9,497		36.1%
1980	12,407		30.6%
1990	20,098		62.0%
2000	41,842		108.2%
2010	62,487		49.3%
2020	83,454		33.6%
2025 (est.)	90,226	▲	8.1%

=== Racial and ethnic composition ===
Franklin city, Tennessee – Racial and ethnic composition Note: the US Census treats Hispanic/Latino as an ethnic category. This table excludes Latinos from the racial categories and assigns them to a separate category. Hispanics/Latinos may be of any race.
Race / Ethnicity (NH = Non-Hispanic)	Pop 2000	Pop 2010	Pop 2020	% 2000	% 2010	% 2020
White alone (NH)	34,377	50,104	62,607	82.16%	80.18%	75.02%
Black or African American alone (NH)	4,316	4,157	4,304	10.31%	6.65%	5.16%
Native American or Alaska Native alone (NH)	80	123	130	0.19%	0.20%	0.16%
Asian alone (NH)	663	2,352	6,395	1.58%	3.76%	7.66%
Pacific Islander alone (NH)	17	21	49	0.04%	0.03%	0.06%
Some Other Race alone (NH)	30	91	407	0.07%	0.15%	0.49%
Mixed Race or Multi-Racial (NH)	334	880	2,874	0.80%	1.41%	3.44%
Hispanic or Latino (any race)	2,025	4,759	6,688	4.84%	7.62%	8.01%
Total	41,842	62,487	83,454	100.00%	100.00%	100.00%

=== 2020 census ===
As of the 2020 census, there was a population of 83,454, with 32,749 households and 23,675 families residing in the city. The median age was 38.4 years, 24.5% of residents were under the age of 18, and 14.5% of residents were 65 years of age or older; for every 100 females there were 91.9 males, and for every 100 females age 18 and over there were 89.0 males age 18 and over.

99.6% of residents lived in urban areas, while 0.4% lived in rural areas.

There were 32,749 households in Franklin, of which 34.0% had children under the age of 18 living in them. Of all households, 56.2% were married-couple households, 14.4% were households with a male householder and no spouse or partner present, and 25.8% were households with a female householder and no spouse or partner present. About 26.5% of all households were made up of individuals and 8.9% had someone living alone who was 65 years of age or older.

There were 34,720 housing units, of which 5.7% were vacant. The homeowner vacancy rate was 0.9% and the rental vacancy rate was 7.3%.

=== 2010 census ===
As of the census of 2010, 62,487 people, 16,128 households, and 11,225 families resided in the city. The population density was 1,393.3 inhabitants per square mile (538.0/km^{2}). The 17,296 housing units averaged 575.9 per square mile (222.4/km^{2}). The racial makeup of the city was 84.53% White, 10.35% African American, 4.84% Latino, 1.61% Asian, 0.24% Native American, 0.05% Pacific Islander, 2.17% from other races, and 1.06% from two or more races.

Of the 16,128 households, 38.6% had children under the age of 18 living with them, 56.2% were married couples living together, 10.8% had a female householder with no husband present, and 30.4% were not families; 25.0% of all households were made up of individuals, and 5.4% had someone living alone who was 65 years of age or older. The average household size was 2.55 and the average family size was 3.09. In the city, the population was distributed as 27.9% under the age of 18, 7.5% from 18 to 24, 38.1% from 25 to 44, 19.2% from 45 to 64, and 7.4% who were 65 years of age or older. The median age was 33 years. For every 100 females, there were 93.6 males. For every 100 females age 18 and over, there were 90.2 males.

The median income for a household in the CDP was $75,871, and for a family was $91,931. Males had a median income of $66,622 versus $43,193 for females. The per capita income for the CDP was $36,445. About 5.0% of families and 7.0% of the population were below the poverty line, including 9.2% of those under age 18 and 6.9% of those age 65 or over. Less than 5.0% of the eligible workforce was unemployed.

== Economy ==
Franklin is home to health-care-related businesses such as Community Health Systems, Acadia Healthcare, Iasis Healthcare, Tivity Health, Home Instead Senior Care, MedSolutions Inc, and Renal Advantage Inc.

Nissan, Mitsubishi Motors, Clarcor, CKE Restaurants, Jackson National Life, Triangle Tyre Company, Provident Music Group, World Christian Broadcasting, Mars Petcare, Franklin American Mortgage, Kaiser Aluminum, Lee Company, Ramsey Solutions, Video Gaming Technologies, and Atmos Energy also have corporate or regional headquarters in Franklin.

In-N-Out Burger will open a hub and distribution center in Franklin by 2026; a privately-held company with its roots in the west, it will be their easternmost expansion. The company's hub will involve a $125.5 million investment.

=== Top employers ===
According to the city's 2024 Comprehensive Annual Financial Report, the top employers in the city were:

#	Employer	# of employees
1	Community Health Systems	3,923
2	Williamson Medical Center	1,900
3	Lee Company	1,616
4	Nissan North America	1,550
5	Cigna Healthcare	1,500
6	MARS Petcare US	1,240
7	Schneider Electric	1,080
8	Ramsey Solutions	1,054
9	eviCore Healthcare	653
10	Jackson National Life Insurance Co.	634

== Government ==
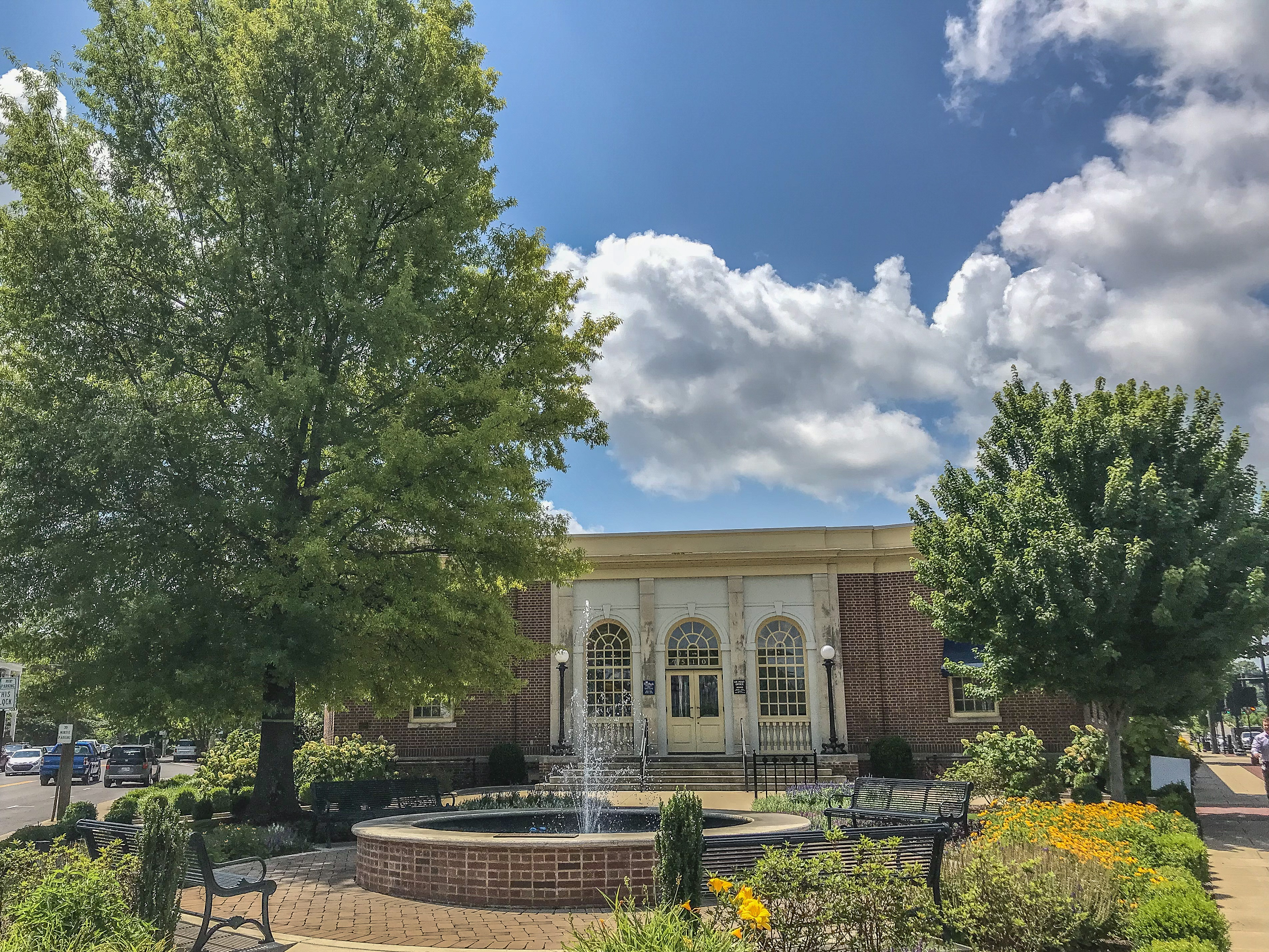
Franklin United States Post Office, built 1925 and restored 1965

The city is run by a mayor, elected at-large in the city, and a board of eight aldermen. Four of the latter are elected from single-member districts of roughly equal population, and four are elected at-large. All electoral offices are for four-year terms, with the ward alderman elected in one cycle, and the mayor and at-large aldermen elected two years later. The city's policies and procedures are decided by the Board of Mayor and Aldermen.

Resolutions, municipal ordinances, and the municipal code are carried out by the city's various departments. These are: Administration, Building and Neighborhood Services, Engineering, Finance, Fire, Human Resources, Information Technology, Law, Planning and Sustainability, Parks, Police, Sanitation and Environmental Services, Streets, and Water Management. These 14 departments are overseen by the City Administrator, a professional manager hired by the Board of Aldermen.

=== Political makeup ===
In the Tennessee House of Representatives, Franklin is divided between three districts; District 61, currently represented by Republican Gino Bulso, District 63, represented by Republican Glen Casada, and District 65, represented by Republican Lee Reeves. Franklin is included in Tennessee Senate District 27, which is coterminous with Williamson County, and held by Republican Jack Johnson, the current Senate Majority Leader.

Franklin is a majority conservative city and usually votes Republican in statewide elections.

Franklin Presidential election results
Year	Republican	Democratic	Third parties
2024	61.54% 28,212	36.78% 16,861	1.68% 768
2020	57.98% 26,242	40.21% 18,198	1.81% 821
2016	60.03% 21,423	32.72% 11,676	7.26% 2,591

== Education ==
=== Public schools ===
For grades K–8, most of the city is served by the Franklin Special School District; high school students attend Williamson County School District. Outerlying portions of the city are in the Williamson County district for grades K–12.

=== Private schools ===
Franklin's private schools include Battle Ground Academy, Franklin Classical School, Franklin Christian Academy, Montessori School of Franklin, New Hope Academy and Thales Academy.

=== Higher education ===
- Belmont University, Williamson Center campus
- Columbia State Community College, Franklin campus. This satellite campus of Columbia State was opened in 2016 after being constructed for this purpose. It is a two-year college, serving a nine-county area in Middle Tennessee
- Lipscomb University, a SPARK satellite campus, is here
- New College Franklin, a small private Christian liberal-arts college is based in Franklin.
- Williamson College

== Infrastructure ==
=== Transportation ===
Interstate 65 passes through the eastern part of the city and provides four exits in the city. U.S. Routes 31 and 431 intersect in the city, and form a concurrency, connecting the city to Nashville to the north. U.S. Route 31 connects the city to Spring Hill and Columbia to the south, and US 431 connects to Lewisburg to the south. State Route 96 connects the city to Murfreesboro to the east, and Dickson to the west. State Route 246 also connects the city to Columbia to the southwest, and serves as an alternative to US 31. State Route 441 begins in the northern part of the city, and connects to Brentwood. State Route 397, also designated as US 31/431 Truck and Mack Hatcher Memorial Parkway, serves as a bypass around the business district of the city to the east. Other major thoroughfares in Franklin include Cool Springs Boulevard and McEwen Drive, both of which have interchanges with I-65.

=== Utilities ===
The City of Franklin Water Management Department operates a system that provides water and wastewater services to a majority of city residents and some residents of surrounding areas. Some areas of Franklin may receive water and wastewater services from the Mallory Valley Utility District, the Milcrofton Utility District, and the HB&TS Utility District.

Electricity is provided by the Middle Tennessee Electric Membership Corporation (MTEMC), which serves several of the suburban counties of Nashville and purchases power from the Tennessee Valley Authority (TVA).

Natural gas service is provided by Atmos Energy.

== Parks ==
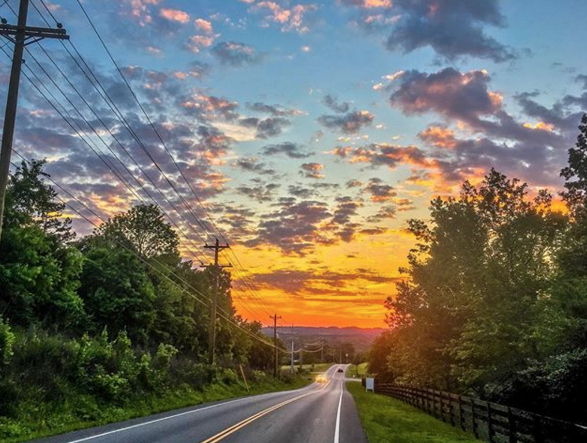
Sunset observed from Long Lane in Franklin

- Aspen Grove Park
- Bicentennial Park
- Carter's Hill Park
- Collins Farm
- Del Rio Park
- Eastern Flank Battlefield Park
- Fieldstone Park
- Fort Granger
- Liberty Park
- The Park at Harlinsdale Farm
- Pinkerton Park
- Jim Warren Park
- Winstead Hill
- New Southeastern Park Complex

== Festivals ==
=== Pilgrimage Music and Cultural Festival ===
Pilgrimage is a music festival put together by Kevin Griffin, who lives and works as a musician in Franklin. Premiering in 2015, it draws nationally prominent acts from a variety of genres. Pilgrimage is held in late September and takes place at The Park at Harlinsdale. In addition to musical acts, it features children's activities, food, and a marketplace showcasing local crafts.

=== Main Street Festival ===
Franklin's Main Street Festival involves artisans, four stages, two carnivals, and two food courts installed in the historic Franklin Square and Downtown District. Arts and crafts booths run from First to Fifth Avenue.

=== Pumpkinfest ===
Pumpkinfest is an annual fundraiser for the Heritage Foundation of Franklin and Williamson County, held on the Saturday before Halloween. The holiday theme is carried through activities including music, children's amusements, local artisans, and food.

=== Dickens of a Christmas ===
Dickens of a Christmas is an annual event that attracts approximately 50,000 visitors. It takes place in Historic Downtown Franklin and is celebrated during the second week in December. Costumed volunteers masquerade as figures from Charles Dickens' A Christmas Carol. Music and dancing are a big part of the festival, and local school and church musical groups often perform. Victorian cuisine is served to visitors, and an arts and crafts bazaar features prominently in Public Square.

== Notable people ==
- David Akers, Retired American football kicker (Philadelphia Eagles), resides in Franklin
- C. J. Beathard, American football player, born and raised in Franklin
- Luke Benward, actor and singer, born in Franklin
- Kenny Chesney, country musician, born in Franklin
- Miley Cyrus, singer-songwriter and actress, born in Franklin and owns a house there
- Duane Eddy, musician, died in Franklin
- David French, journalist and lawyer, resides in Franklin
- Sarah Ewing Sims Carter Gaut, Confederate spy and socialite, resided and died in Franklin
- Steffany Gretzinger, Christian musician based in Franklin
- Robert Knight, musician, born in Franklin
- Bill Lee, 50th governor of Tennessee, born in Franklin
- Garrison Mathews, basketball player, born in Franklin
- Carrie Winder McGavock, slave owner and caretaker of the McGavock Confederate Cemetery in Franklin
- Dustin Ortiz, mixed martial artist, born in Franklin
- Brad Paisley, country musician, resides in Franklin
- Paramore, rock band formed in Franklin
- Andrew Puzder, businessman, resides in Franklin
- Dave Ramsey, TV/radio personality and financial advisor, resided in Franklin
- Frazier Reams, U.S. representative from Ohio
- Mariah Reddick, slave at Carnton Plantation in Franklin
- Scott Stapp, rock musician, member of Creed
- Cal Turner Jr., billionaire heir, former CEO of Dollar General, resides in Franklin
- Darrell Waltrip, NASCAR Hall of Famer, 3x NASCAR Cup Series champion
- Hayley Williams, musician, co-founder of Paramore
- Oprah Winfrey, media personality, purchased her father's home in Franklin
- Ben Zobrist, former baseball player, resides in Franklin

== In popular culture ==
- Some scenes from the 1986 Orion Pictures movie At Close Range, starring Sean Penn, Christopher Walken, and Kiefer Sutherland, was filmed in downtown Franklin.
- The ABC television show Nashville (2012) filmed many concert show segments at the Franklin Theatre.
- Canadian singer Justin Bieber filmed the 2011 video for his song "Mistletoe" in Downtown Franklin.
- The 2015 Town Square Pictures movie The Secret Handshake, starring Kevin Sorbo, Amy Grant, and Mark Collie, was filmed in Franklin's Cottonwood subdivision.
- The 2017 EchoLight Studios movie Sweet Sweet Summertime, starring David DeLuise, Markie Post, and Jaci Velasquez, was filmed in Franklin.

== Sister cities ==
Franklin is an active participant in the Sister Cities program. Sister Cities of Franklin & Williamson County was founded as an outgrowth of Leadership Franklin in March 2002. The City of Franklin has relationships with the following municipalities:

- Carleton Place, Ontario, Canada (2005)
- County Laois, Ireland (2008)
- Bad Soden am Taunus, Hesse, Germany (2016)
- Ciudad Rodrigo, Spain (2024)

== See also ==
- Tennessee and Alabama Railroad Freight Depot
