= Eddy Brothers =

American mediums

The Eddy Brothers were William and Horatio Eddy, two American mediums best known in the 1870s for their alleged psychic powers. Magicians and skeptics dismissed the Eddy brothers "spirit" materializations as blatant frauds.

== Biography ==
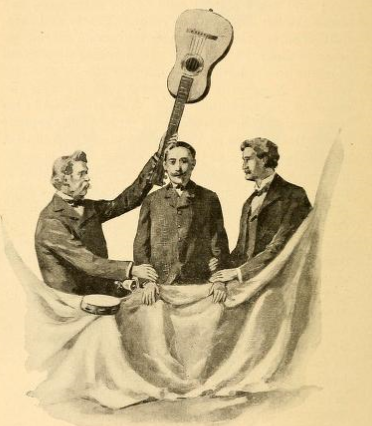
A sketch revealing the séance trick that Horatio (left) would use.

The brothers were sons of Zephaniah Eddy and his wife Julia Maccombs, natives of Vermont. It was alleged that their family could be traced back to the Salem witch trials, and that they had a long history of psychic ability. Growing up on a small farm in Chittenden, Vermont, both brothers claimed to have exhibited strong psychic abilities from an early age. Both the sons took up mediumship and held séances, in which it was alleged that they produced ectoplasm materializations and communicated with spirit guides. William would work in a séance cabinet on occasion and his brother Horatio would sit outside a cloth screen where it was alleged that spirits would play musical instruments behind the screen.

In 1870, William and Horatio were living with their widowed mother Julia in Chittenden. There, the Eddy family opened a small inn, called the Green Tavern. In addition to lodging travelers, the Green Tavern was also the spot of regularly scheduled séances that the brothers put on for visitors from around the world.

A typical séance of the Eddy Brothers would have the audience gathered in the "circle" room at the tavern. One of the brothers would enter a special spirit box at the front of the room (essentially just a small room with a chair in it) and lapse into a deep trance, at which point the show would start. It was alleged that instruments would start playing music on their own, various noises could be heard and strange lights would be seen.

The Eddy brothers convinced theosophists Henry Steel Olcott, Helena Blavatsky and hydrotherapist E. P. Miller that their materializations were genuine, although neurologist George M. Beard dismissed all their phenomena as fraudulent. Beard stated that with a few dollars' worth of drapery he could replicate the costumes of all the alleged materializations. In 1874, Olcott met Blavatsky at Eddy's family farm in Chittenden. Blavatsky defended the Eddy brothers against accusations of fraud from Beard.

== Tricks ==
The Eddy brothers séance trick was exposed by the magician Chung Ling Soo. The trick involved a curtain that was put across the room, with musical instruments placed on a table inside the curtain space. Two members of the audience would be selected and enter the curtain. Horatio would grasp the audience sitter's left arm and the other sitter would grasp his right arm. To the audience outside the curtain, various musical instruments would be seen floating in the air above the top of the curtain and tapping the trio on the head. A hand would also come through the curtain and write a message on a slate held by William who was sitting outside the curtain. The trick was performed by Horatio evading control and releasing his hand. He would do this by various methods such as using a fake hand made from a piece of heavy sheet lead which he would place in his left hand and grasp the audience sitter's arm. Horatio would quietly remove his real hand with the leaden hand remaining behind, giving the sense of touch that an actual hand was there. With his hands free Horatio would manipulate the instruments and perform the alleged supernatural phenomena.

The psychical researcher Hereward Carrington also revealed the sleight of hand tricks the Eddy brothers had used. Carrington described their tricks as "absurdly simple" and was surprised that people had been fooled by them.

== See also ==
- Davenport brothers
- Thomas brothers
