= John S. Irgens =

Norwegian-American politician (1832–1901)

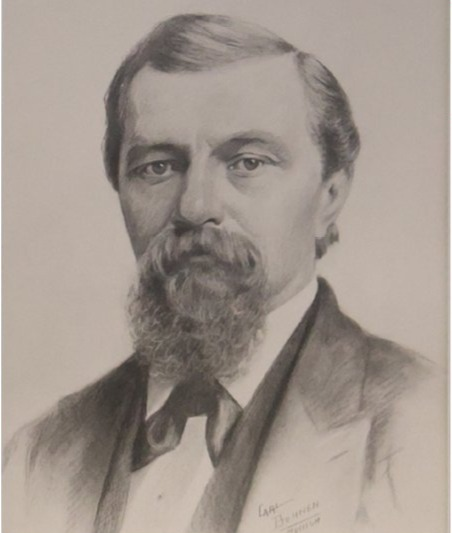
- Irgens c. 1910 by Carl Bohnen

7th Minnesota Secretary of State
- In office 1876–1880
- Governor: John S. Pillsbury
- Preceded by: Samuel P. Jennison
- Succeeded by: Frederick Von Baumbach

Member of the Minnesota House of Representatives
- In office 1875–1876

Personal details
- Born: Johannes Stephanus Olsen Irgens; February 10, 1832 Christiania, United Kingdoms of Sweden and Norway
- Died: December 31, 1901 (aged 69) Jamul, California, U.S.
- Resting place: Mount Hope Cemetery, San Diego, California, U.S.
- Party: Republican
- Spouse: Louisa Petronelle Arentz
- Children: 7

Military service
- Allegiance: United States of America
- Branch/service: Union Army
- Years of service: 1862-1862
- Rank: Second Lieutenant
- Unit: 15th Wisconsin Infantry Regiment
- Commands: Company K, 15th Wisconsin Infantry Regiment
- Battles/wars: American Civil War: Battle of Island Number Ten

Johannes Stephanus Olsen Irgens (February 10, 1832 – December 31, 1901), sometimes anglicized as John S. Irgens, was a Norwegian-American farmer, soldier, and politician. During his political career Irgens served as a member of the Minnesota House of Representatives as well as two consecutive terms as Minnesota Secretary of State from 1876 to 1880.

== Early life ==
Johannes Stephanus Irgens was born on February 10, 1832, in Christiania, Norway (now Oslo), to parents Ole Irgens and Henrietta Christina Calmeyer. Irgens' father Ole was the paymaster of the mines in Modum. Irgens was privately educated and spoke a total of four languages. Irgens left Norway on June 8, 1849, aboard the ship Lyna which sailed from Drammen to New York. Irgens arrived in New York on August 14, 1849, and immediately worked as a mercantile clerk in New York before moving west to Chicago. In 1857 Irgens moved to St. Ansgar, Iowa, although he often worked in Adams, Minnesota. While in Iowa Irgens began working as a farmer.

== Military service ==
At the outbreak of the American Civil War Irgens volunteered for service in the Union Army on March 1, 1862, and was enrolled as a Private into Company K of the 15th Wisconsin Infantry Regiment, nicknamed the "Scandinavian Regiment". Company K despite being a Wisconsin regiment was primarily made up of volunteers from southern Minnesota and northern Iowa and was led by Captain Mons Hansen Grinager. Irgens was originally appointed as the First Sergeant of Company K before being commissioned to the rank of Second Lieutenant on June 5, 1862. Due to damage to his ear and hearing loss following the Battle of Island Number Ten, Irgens resigned his commission and was mustered out of service due to disability on September 3, 1862.

== Political career ==
Following his military service Irgens became the railroad station master in Adams, Minnesota before entering politics. Irgens first political office was serving as the treasurer of Mower County, Minnesota from 1870 to 1874. Irgens later served in the Minnesota House of Representatives in the 17th Minnesota Legislature from 1875 to 1876 as a member of the Republican Party of Minnesota. In 1875 Irgens ran in the 1875 Minnesota Secretary of State election and soundly defeated both Adolph Biermann and John H. Stevens. Irgens won a second term in the 1877 Minnesota Secretary of State election against Peter T. Lindholm and Albert E. Rice among others. Irgens served as the seventh Minnesota Secretary of State from 1876 to 1880 under Governor of Minnesota John S. Pillsbury. Following his term as Minnesota Secretary of State, Irgens was elected as the postmaster of Adams, Minnesota in Mower County.

== Personal life ==
Irgens was married to Louisa Petronelle Arentz (1826–1916) of Stavanger, Norway on December 18, 1853, in Chicago, together they had a total of seven children, two of which died at young ages. Irgens was a follower of Lutheranism and was one of the founding members of the St. Olaf Evangelical Lutheran church in Austin, Minnesota. Irgens died on December 31, 1901, in Jamul, California, at the age of 69. He is buried at Mount Hope Cemetery in San Diego.
