= Carl Giers =

American politician

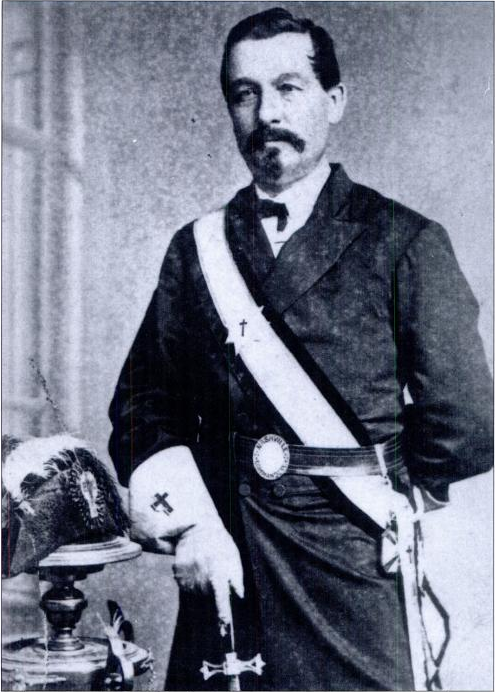
- Self-portrait
- Born: April 28, 1828; Bonn, Kingdom of Prussia
- Died: May 24, 1877 (aged 49); Nashville, Tennessee, United States
- Resting place: Mount Olivet Cemetery, Nashville, Tennessee
- Occupation: Photographer
- Political party: Liberal Republican
- Spouse: Pauline Giers
- Children: 2

Carl Caspar Giers (April 28, 1828 – May 24, 1877) was a Kingdom of Prussia-born American photographer active primarily in Nashville, Tennessee, in the mid-19th century. In documenting Nashville's rapid postwar growth and expansion, he photographed numerous prominent individuals, including political leaders, Civil War generals, and important business and cultural figures. A popular resident of the city, he served one term in the Tennessee House of Representatives (1874–1875), having been the nominee of both the Democratic and Republican parties.

Giers was the adopted father of Otto Giers (1858–1940), who continued the family trade into the 20th century.

== Life ==
Giers was born in Bonn, and immigrated to the United States in 1845. He moved to Nashville in 1852, where he initially he worked as a conductor for the Nashville and Chattanooga Railroad (he reportedly piloted the first passenger train in Murfreesboro). In January 1855, he opened a daguerreotype studio at the corner of Deaderick and College streets that featured "powerful side and sky lights" and rooms "fitted up in elegant style," and catered to "the ladies particularly." Later that year, he exhibited his work at Nashville's Mechanics' Fair. In 1859, Giers overhauled his studio and renamed it the "Southern Photographic Temple of Fine Arts." Along with daguerreotypes, the new studio offered ambrotypes and miniatures, and provided photographic enlargement services.

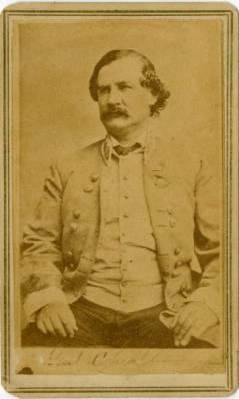
Benjamin F. Cheatham, photographed by Giers c. 1860

During the Civil War, Giers photographed both Confederate and Union soldiers. After the Union Army occupied Nashville in early 1862, Giers was given a pass to move about freely in the city, and to travel outside the city. By October 1863, he had moved to a new gallery on Union Street, selling his old gallery to Thomas Farquar Saltsman. In late 1865, Giers became a founding member of the German Union Committee, which cooperated with the American Central Union Committee to "secure the election of competent and uncompromising Union men to the offices of the State."

During the decade following the end of the war, Giers was a persistent advocate for immigration, and frequently encouraged state officials to advertise the state in Europe. He was a member of the inaugural Board of Directors of the Tennessee Colonial and Immigration Society in 1866, and served as President of the German Immigration Society during the same period. In 1870, he helped convince thirty-eight German families to move to Tennessee. He was a frequent presence at Nashville German-American festivals and events during this period, and was "Worshipful Master" of the Masons' Germania Lodge.

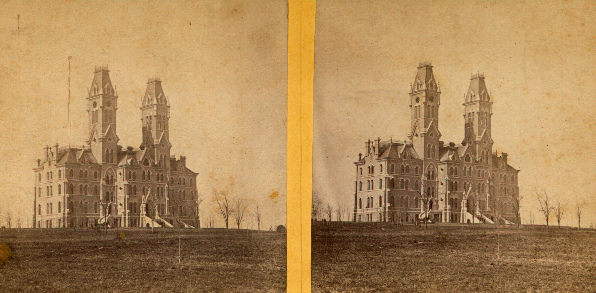
Stereocard of the main building (now Kirkland Hall) at Vanderbilt University (1875)

During the presidential campaign of 1872, Giers supported the Liberal Republican Party, which opposed the renomination of President Ulysses S. Grant. In March 1872, Giers signed a petition calling on state Republicans to send delegates to the Liberal Republican convention in Cincinnati. In June 1872, Giers presided over a Nashville German-American convention that endorsed Liberal Republican candidate Horace Greeley for president.

In September 1874, Nashville Democrats nominated Giers for one of Davidson County's four seats in the Tennessee House of Representatives. Shortly afterward, the city's Republicans also endorsed Giers, and he was easily elected in November. Giers opposed repudiation of the state's out-of-control debt (the state debt was becoming one of the most contentious issues in Tennessee politics), and argued in favor of reorganizing the state bureaucracy to eliminate unnecessary offices. He continued to champion immigration, and called for the state to appoint a commissioner to advertise Tennessee in Europe. He also opposed the controversial convict lease system. He served only one term (39th General Assembly), and did not seek reelection.

Giers died at his home on Granny White Pike on the outskirts of Nashville on May 24, 1877, "after a long and painful illness." He is buried in Nashville's Mount Olivet Cemetery. His family sold his studio to photographer W.E. Armstrong. Giers' adopted son, Otto Giers (1858–1940), took up photography in 1883, and continued the trade into the early 20th century.

== Works ==
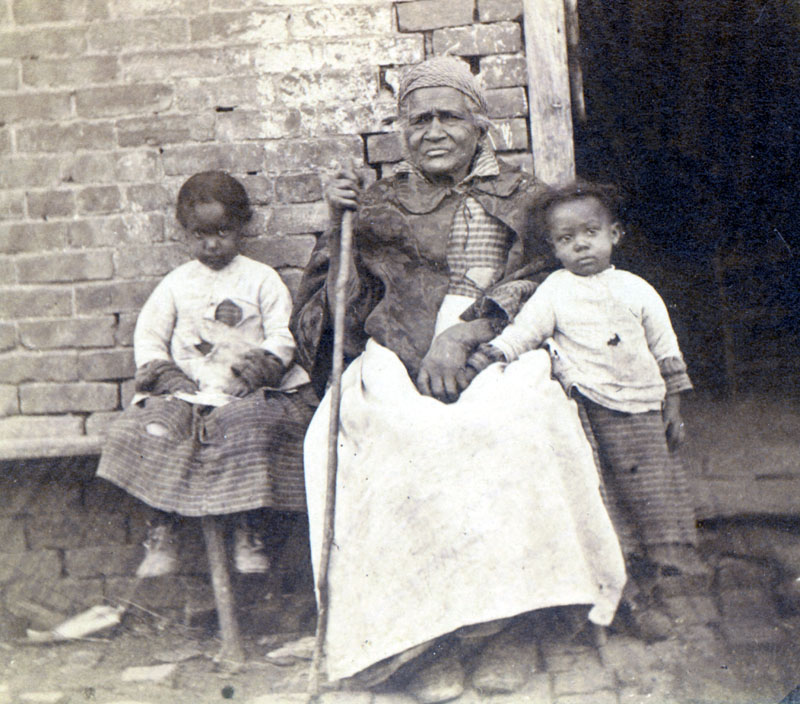
Betty Jackson, a former slave of Andrew Jackson, with her two great-grandchildren, photographed by Giers in 1867

Giers initially worked with daguerreotypes, but was offering ambrotypes and miniatures by the end of the 1850s. During and after the Civil War, he specialized in carte de visite, a popular type of portraiture at the time. He offered colored photographs (manually colored with oil and ink) as early as 1864. In 1871, he advertised miniature photographs that fit on the faces of watches. Giers made frequent trips to the eastern United States, where he acquainted himself with the latest photographic techniques.

Giers' studio, located at 43-45 Union Street in Nashville, was described by the local newspaper as a "mammoth art gallery" and one of the city's key tourist attractions in the early 1870s. The studio featured a large exhibition gallery with an elaborate display window facing Union Street. A sitting room and dressing rooms for men and women were located toward the back of the building on the first floor. Operators' rooms were located on the second floor. Giers kept a negative of each photograph, and provided patrons with a unique number that would allow them to easily order a duplicate at any time.

At its height, Giers' studio employed over two dozen artists, assistants, and other workers. Artists and photographers who worked at Giers studio at various times included T. M. Schleier, Andrew Bulot, and Charles A. Paret. Paret, who joined the studio in the mid-1860s, colored many of the photos produced by the studio. Colonel Lee Crandall (1832–1926), a former officer in the Confederate Army, managed the studio when Giers was away on trips.

Prominent individuals photographed by Giers included presidents Andrew Johnson and Ulysses S. Grant, former First Lady Sarah Childress Polk, governors Isham G. Harris, William G. Brownlow, and John C. Brown, and numerous railroad executives and other business officials. During his term in the Tennessee House of Representatives, he created portraits of each member of the state legislature. Giers photographed both Confederate and Union generals during the Civil War, including Benjamin F. Cheatham, Felix K. Zollicoffer, John Hunt Morgan, Joseph F. Knipe, George Henry Thomas, and Thomas H. Ruger. Other prominent individuals photographed by Giers included outlaw Jesse James, whiskey dealer George A. Dickel, abolitionist Frederick Douglass, and several former slaves of Andrew Jackson.

Giers displayed his photographs at various fairs in the Nashville region. He nearly swept the photography prizes at the Tennessee Agricultural and Mechanic Association Fair in October 1871. He exhibited his work at the Vienna Exposition in 1873 and the United States Centennial Exposition in Philadelphia in 1876. His photographs are now part of the collections of the Tennessee State Library and Archives, the Calvin M. McClung Collection in Knoxville, and the New York Public Library. A self-portrait of Giers is part of the collections of the National Portrait Gallery in Washington.

== Gallery ==
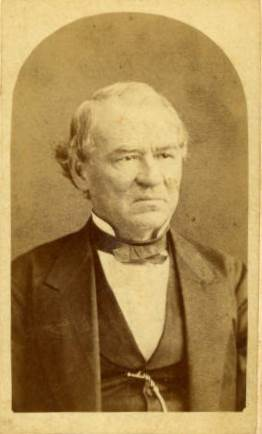
Andrew Johnson

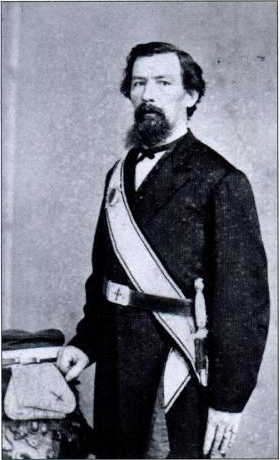
George A. Dickel

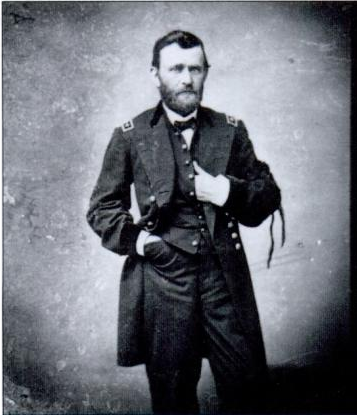
Ulysses S. Grant

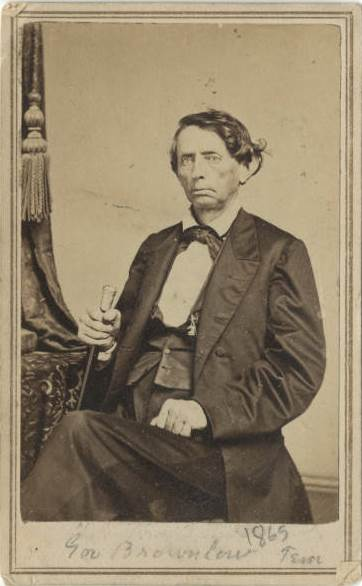
William G. Brownlow
