= Emma Louise Ashford =

American composer and organist

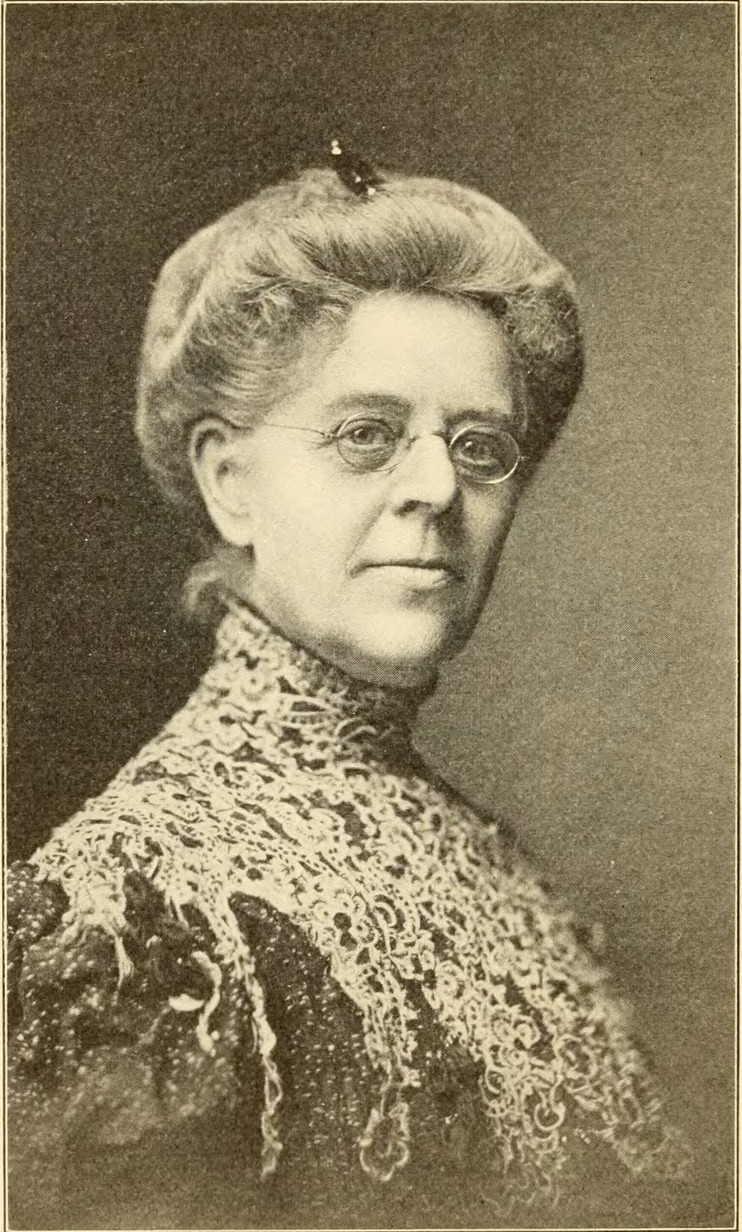
- Born: Emma Louise Hindle; March 29, 1850; Newark
- Died: September 22, 1930; Nashville
- Occupations: Composer, organist

Emma Louise Ashford (born Hindle, March 27, 1850 – September 22, 1930) was an American organist, composer, and music editor. She wrote over 600 compositions. From 1894 to 1930 she was an editor at Lorenz Publishing Company, and at its periodicals The Choir Leader and The Organist.

== Early life ==
Emma Louise Ashford (born Emma Louise Hindle) was born in Newark, Delaware, the only child of English parents. She received her first musical training at an early age from her father, James Hindle, who was a singing teacher. At eight years old she was admitted to her local Episcopal Church choir as an alto. She came to be known as "the best sight reader in the choir." From the choir director she also received instruction on piano and organ. In 1864, at age fourteen, her family moved to Ballard Vale, Massachusetts. Here she met and became acquainted with composer James Ramsey Murray (famous for his music to the Christmas carol Away in a Manger).

The following year her family moved to Connecticut, where she took the organist position at St. Peter's Episcopal Church in Seymour, Connecticut. At that time she also studied piano with a Mrs. Street, and pipe organ with Dr. Anderson of St. Paul's Church, New Haven, CT.

== Marriage ==
At one of her family's musical evenings, Hindle, now age seventeen, met John Ashford (1837–1930), a young engineer and amateur singer who had recently relocated to Connecticut from Bath, England. They married in 1867, and eventually moved to Chicago, Illinois. Mrs. Ashford was chosen out of twenty-eight applicants to fill the solo alto position at St. John's Episcopal Church, whose director was the renowned Dudley Buck. She also became the church's organist and harmony teacher. Emma considered the year she spent under the guidance of Professor Buck to be most significant and influential for her musical development.

In 1884, the Ashfords moved to Nashville, Tennessee, where John Ashford had been appointed the Superintendent of Buildings and Grounds at Vanderbilt University. Here he founded the Vanderbilt Glee Club. The couple lived at 2105 Dixie Place which has since been torn down and replaced with a parking garage.

Together the Ashfords led the choirs of some of the largest churches in Nashville. She also put more energy into composing her own music. She had, from the time of her youth, studied harmony and counterpoint with a number of teachers, most notably Henri Weber and Dr. R. H. Peters, Mus.D., who noted her "deep and clear insight into things musical" and was impressed with her "intense musical temperament."

== Later life and musical development ==
In Nashville Emma began to be noticed as a composer. The university's dean, Herbert Tolman (1865–1923) said of her: "Of the women of our town, some have distinguished themselves in literature and some in art, but in the field of musical composition there is one name par excellence. It is the name of Mrs Emma L. Ashford."

For many years Emma and John could be found directing the music at the First Cumberland Presbyterian Church and the Ohabai Sholom Jewish Temple and for several years Emma filled the place of organist at various churches, including the First Baptist, Tulip Street (Methodist), and Christ Church (Episcopal).

All the while, Emma was also pursuing her own studies in harmony, counterpoint, canon and fugue with Christian Heinrich Weber (b.1812–d?), co-leader of the Nashville Academy of Music, and Dr R.H. Peters, Director of Music at Converse College. Spartanburg. Peters would later remark: Her work was excellent in every respect, and showed unmistakably that behind it all there existed brains as well as intense musical temperament and appreciation. For Mrs. Ashford’s ability in matters musical I entertain a respect that borders on the profound. In 1894, 1897 and 1904 Emma made study trips to Europe.

Emma Ashford is buried in the Mount Olivet Cemetery in Nashville.

== Music editor ==
in 1894 Emma Ashford was appointed an editor for two periodicals published by the Lorenz Publishing Company - The Choir Leader (associate editor, and eventually editor), and The Organist — A Bimonthly Journal Devoted to the Pipe Organ and the Reed Organ (Editor). Many of her anthems were published in The Choir Leader, a long-running monthly magazine for small-to-medium size church choirs. Over the years many of Ashford's organ works appeared in The Organist, as well as in the numerous collections Ashford prepared for Lorenz Publishing Company. Some of these collections contained music exclusively by Ashford; others featured music from a wide range of classic and contemporary organ composers, in addition to pieces written by Ashford specifically for each collection.

== Published composer ==
In 1890 some of Ashford's vocal music - songs, quartets and trios - was published by the John Church Company. In 1893, renowned music publisher, compiler and editor E. O. Excell began publishing Ashford's anthems, including 17 in Excell's Anthems, Volume IV (1893) and 4 more in Excell's Anthems, Volume V (1896). These publications also included anthems from more than 20 other American composers. She made three trips abroad, in 1894, 1897, and in 1904, studying in England with the leading masters of the time. While abroad in 1894 she spent a large part of her time studying ecclesiastical music. In 1896 Ashford began publishing with Lorenz Publishing Company, and in 1902 she signed an exclusive contract to publish all her music with Lorenz.

== Selected works and publications ==
Ashford composed over 600 works, including 21 cantatas, over 250 anthems, vocal music for solo, duet, trio and quartet of voices, song cycles, and works for organ and piano. Among her works written specifically for Vanderbilt University, the most acclaimed was Vanderbilt Ode, written in 1901 for Vanderbilt's 25th birthday celebration.

=== Anthems ===
==== Collections ====
Ashford wrote over 250 anthems for chorus, beginning with those published by E.O. Excell in 1893. She continued to compose anthems and other choral works throughout her career.

- Excell's Anthems
  - 1893 Volume 4, includes 17 anthems by Ashford.
  - 1896 Volume 5, includes 4 anthems by Ashford.
- 1898 Regal Anthems, chorus ["a choice collection of music for quartet and chorus choirs"]
- 1899 Ashford's Anthems, "a collection of new anthems and new arrangements".

=== Cantatas ===
(written for church choirs, choral societies, and musical societies)

- 1895/1923 The Prince of Peace, 4-part Christmas cantata
- 1897? The Prince of Light, a Christmas cantata
- 1897 Cross and Crown, cantata
- 1898 Priest and King, Easter cantata [co-written with 7 other composers]
- 1898 The Light of Life, a Christmas cantata
- 1901 Easter Dawn, an Easter cantata
- 1902 Santa Claus in Wonderland, a Christmas cantata [based on "Alice in Wonderland"]
- 1903 The Beatitudes, cantata
- 1904 The Star of Promise, cantata
- 1904 The Life of a Leaf, secular cantata
- 1906 King of Glory, an Easter cantata
- 1908 Pan Among the Reeds, a short cantata
- 1908 Promise and Fulfilment, a Christmas cantata
- 1911 God with Us, cantata for Christmas
- 1911 The Passover (Das Passah), cantata
- 1912 Resurrection Light, cantata
- 1913 Holy Night, A Christmas cantata
- 1918 Our Risen Savior, an Easter cantata
- 1921 The Manger Prince, a Christmas cantata
- 1824 King Triumphant, an Easter cantata
- 1925 Tidings of Great Joy, a Christmas cantata

=== Hymn tunes ===
- 1892
  - Keep away, keep away, let my spirit have rest
  - O, erring one, say not too late (No, Not Too Late)
  - There is another, better world (A Better World)
- 1894
  - Come, and listen to the story (The Wondrous Story)
  - Jesus with you is pleading (Come, Sinner, Come) (pub. E.O. Excell)
  - Weary and heavy laden (O God Be Merciful) (pub. E.O. Excell)
- 1896 Many stories quaint and olden (Christmas Bells) (pub. E.O. Excell)
- 1898 We're soldiers in the army of the Lord (The Christian Soldier)
- 1900
  - Do you know a heart that hungers (Speak a Kind Word)
  - Hand in hand with Jesus I have prayed that I might go (With Jesus, Hand in Hand)
  - Out upon the barren mountain (Jesus Saves)
- 1903
  - Christ came to the world on Christmas morn (The Christmas Birthday Song)
  - To love someone more dearly every day
- 1905
  - Evelyn (They who seek the throne of grace)
  - Hear now the voice of the Savior (In the Golden Glow of Youth)
  - I'll have a drink of water cool (The Drink for Me)
  - Resting on the faithfulness of Christ our Lord (Resting on the Lord)
  - Ring the merry Christmas bells (Christmas Bells)
  - Sutherland (Holy, and true, and righteous Lord) (pub. Jennings & Graham Pub.)
- 1906
  - Life is for service in Jesus' dear name (The Good that I Can Do)
  - Lord, I hear of showers of blessings (Showers of Blessings)
  - Soldiers on the battle field (Fight to Win)
- 1911 A sure retreat, hymn, chorus (pub. Lorenz)
- 1913 Crossing the Bar (Sunset and evening star)
- 1921/26 Scarritt

=== Organ ===
Ashford composed hundreds of works for organ, as well as arranging and editing works by other composers which were published separately or in various collections from 1898 to 1927.

==== Collections ====
- The American Organist
  - 1912 Sacred Voluntaries, Volume 1
  - 1913 Sacred Voluntaries, Volume 2
- Ashford's Easy Organ Voluntaries for Reed or Pipe Organ (1903)
- Ashford's Hymn Voluntaries
  - 1901 Volume 1
  - 1910 Volume 2
- Ashford's Organ Instructor
  - 1901 Book 1
  - 1904 Book 2
  - 1906 Book 3
  - 1908 Book 4
- Ashford's Organ Voluntaries
  - 1898 Volume 1
  - 1899 Volume 2
- The Diapason (1906)
- Favorite Organ Voluntaries (1917) 3 volumes
- Forty-Three Organ Offertories for Pipe or Reed Organs (1907)
- Funeral Voluntaries (1910)
- Lorenz's Practical Voluntaries
  - 1918 Book 1
  - 1920 Book2
  - 1922 Book 3
  - 1924 Book 4
- Lorenz's Three-staff Organ Folio (1927)
- The Melodia
  - 1920 No.1
  - 1921 No. 2
- Organ Praise Series
  - 1909 No. 1
  - 1910? No. 2
  - 1911 No. 3
- The Organ Treasury
  - 1900 No. 1
  - 1901 No. 2
  - 1902 No. 3
  - 1903 No. 4 and No. 5
- The Organist's Helper
  - 1915 No. 1
  - 1916 No. 2 and No. 3
  - 1917 No. 4
- The Pedal Organ
  - 1908 No. 1
  - 1909? No. 2
  - 1910 No. 3
- Vox Celeste
  - 1905 No. 1
  - 1906? No. 2
  - 1907 No. 3
  - 1908 No. 4

=== Vocal music ===
Ashford composed more than 100 songs for 1, 2 or 3 voices and piano (or organ), including several song cycles and song collections.

- 1903
  - Labor and love (2 solos), voice and piano [which includes Ashford's most popular song "My Task"]
  - Moods (7 songs), high voice and piano ["a series of songs"]
- 1905 Springtime, song cycle (5 songs), unison children's chorus and piano (1905)
- 1911 Love's Dial, song cycle (5 songs), high voice and piano
- 1812 Smiles (8 songs), voice and piano ["A Collection of Humorous Encore Songs, etc"]
- 1913
  - Two Easter Solos, voice and piano
  - In my lady's garden, song cycle (5 songs), low voice and piano
- 1914 Love Lyrics, song cycle (3 songs), low voice and piano (1914)
