= Bruce Ryburn Payne =

American educator (1874-1937)

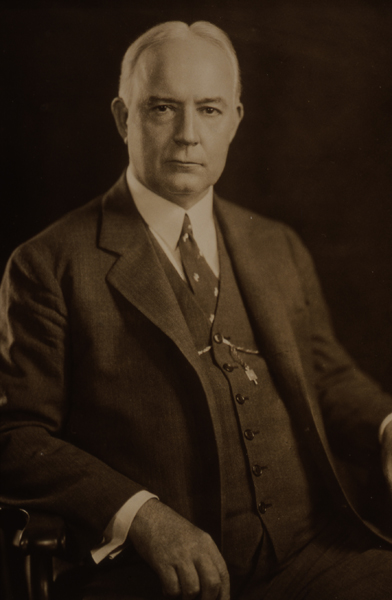
- Born: February 18, 1874; Catawba County, North Carolina, U.S.
- Died: April 21, 1937 (aged 63); Nashville, Tennessee, U.S.
- Resting place: Mount Olivet Cemetery
- Education: Patton School; Duke University; Columbia University
- Occupation: Educator
- Known for: Founding President of Peabody College
- Spouse: Lula Carr (m. 1897)
- Children: 1

Bruce Ryburn Payne (1874-1937) was an American educator. He was the founding president of Peabody College (now part of Vanderbilt University) from 1911 to 1937.

== Early life ==
Bruce Ryburn Payne was born on February 18, 1874, in Catawba County, North Carolina. His father, Jordan Nathaniel Payne, was a Methodist minister and teacher. His mother was Barbara Anne Eliza Warlick.

Payne was educated at the Patton School in Morganton, North Carolina, graduating in 1892. He graduated from Duke University in 1896. He received a master's degree from Duke University in 1902 and a PhD from Columbia University in 1904.

== Career ==
Payne taught at the Morganton Academy from 1896 to 1899, when he became superintendent for the county. He taught Latin and Greek at Durham High School in Durham, North Carolina, from 1899 to 1902.

Payne taught philosophy at the College of William & Mary from 1904 to 1905. He taught at the University of Virginia from 1905 to 1911. While he was at UVA, he created the summer school.

Payne served as the founding President of Peabody College in Nashville Tennessee from 1911 to 1937. He raised funds for the construction of the buildings and hired the initial faculty. He used the telephone to communicate with faculty and staff.

== Personal life ==
Payne married Lula Carr on December 7, 1897. They had a son, Maxwell Carr Payne.

== Death and legacy ==
Payne died of a heart attack on April 21, 1937, in Nashville, Tennessee. His funeral was conducted by Methodist Bishop Costen Jordan Harrell, and he was buried at the Mount Olivet Cemetery on April 23, 1937. In 1957, Peabody College dedicated a building on the north end of its campus to Dr. Payne, now called Payne Hall. Decades later, in 1979, Peabody College was acquired by Vanderbilt University.

== Bibliography ==
- —— (1903). The ethical standard and its educational implications (Master's thesis thesis). Columbia University. OCLC 56165146.
- —— (1905). Public elementary school curricula : a comparative study of representative cities of the United States, England, Germany and France. New York: Silver, Burdett. OCLC 7229479.
- —— (1910). Common words commonly misspelled. B.F. Johnson Pub. Co. OCLC 003773424.
- ——; Mims, Edwin (1910). Southern prose and poetry for schools. New York: Charles Scribner's Sons. OCLC 1319830.
- —— (1911). Five years of high school progress in Virginia. Charlottesville, VA. OCLC 7134816.
- ——; Garrison, Sidney Clarence (1931). The Payne-Garrison speller. Rand, McNally & Co. OCLC 613009403.
