= 1875 Minnesota Secretary of State election =

- November 2, 1875
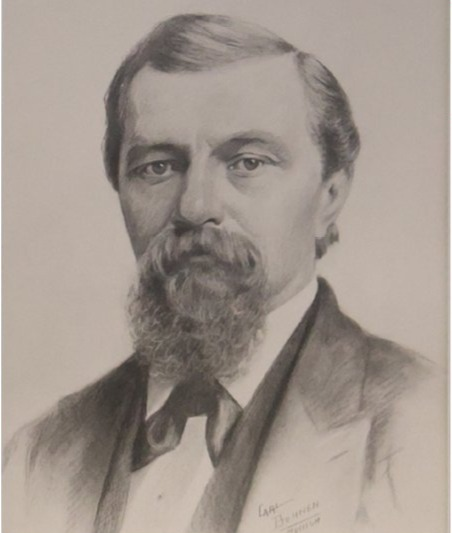

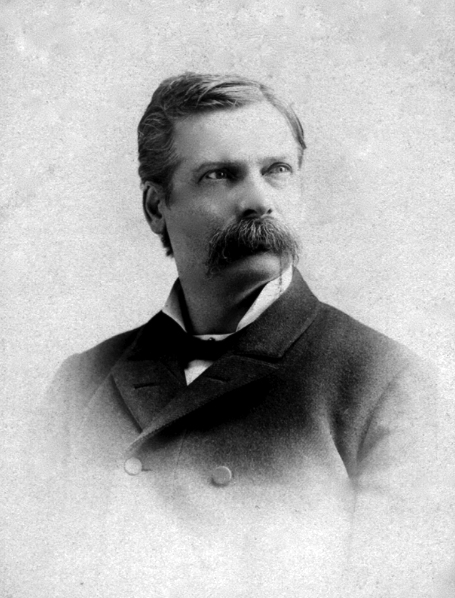
Nominee	John S. Irgens	Adolph Biermann
Party	Republican	Democratic
Popular vote	44,820	33,969
Percentage	55.81%	42.30%
Secretary of State before election
Samuel P. Jennison
Republican
Elected Secretary of State
John S. Irgens
Republican

The 1875 Minnesota Secretary of State election was held on November 2, 1875, in order to elect the Secretary of State of Minnesota. Republican nominee John S. Irgens defeated Democratic nominee Adolph Biermann and Temperance nominee and former member of the Minnesota Senate John H. Stevens.

== General election ==
On election day, November 2, 1875, Republican nominee John S. Irgens won the election by a margin of 10,851 votes against his foremost opponent Democratic nominee Adolph Biermann, thereby retaining Republican control over the office of Secretary of State. Irgens was sworn in as the 7th Minnesota Secretary of State on January 7, 1876.

=== Results ===
Minnesota Secretary of State election, 1875
Party	Candidate	Votes	%
Republican	John S. Irgens	44,820	55.81
Democratic	Adolph Biermann	33,969	42.30
Prohibition	John H. Stevens	1,521	1.89
Total votes		80,310	100.00
Republican hold			
