= 1877 Minnesota Secretary of State election =

- November 6, 1877
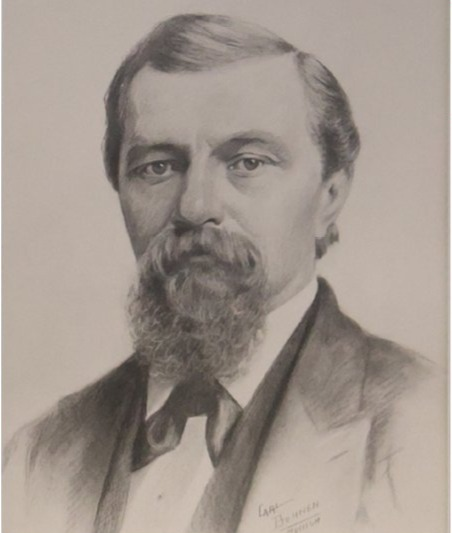

Nominee	John S. Irgens	Peter T. Lindholm
Party	Republican	Democratic
Popular vote	55,125	37,071
Percentage	57.62%	38.75%
Secretary of State before election
John S. Irgens
Republican
Elected Secretary of State
John S. Irgens
Republican

The 1877 Minnesota Secretary of State election was held on November 6, 1877, in order to elect the Secretary of State of Minnesota. Republican nominee and incumbent Secretary of State John S. Irgens defeated Democratic nominee Peter T. Lindholm, Temperance nominee Moses T. Anderson and Greenback nominee Charles H. Roberts. The Greenback Party originally nominated Albert E. Rice, but after Rice declined the nomination, he was replaced by Charles H. Roberts. Despite this, Rice still received 1,469 votes and ultimately performed better than the official Greenback nominee.

== General election ==
On election day, November 6, 1877, Republican nominee John S. Irgens won re-election by a margin of 18,054 votes against his foremost opponent Democratic nominee Peter T. Lindholm, thereby retaining Republican control over the office of Secretary of State. Irgens was sworn in for his second term on January 7, 1878.

=== Results ===
Minnesota Secretary of State election, 1877
Party	Candidate	Votes	%
Republican	John S. Irgens (incumbent)	55,125	57.62
Democratic	Peter T. Lindholm	37,071	38.75
Greenback	Albert E. Rice	1,469	1.54
Prohibition	Moses T. Anderson	1,267	1.32
Greenback	Charles H. Roberts	732	0.77
Total votes		95,664	100.00
Republican hold			
