= Samuel P. Jennison =

"Minnesota Brigadier General", "Minnesota Secretary of State"

Samuel Pearce Jennison
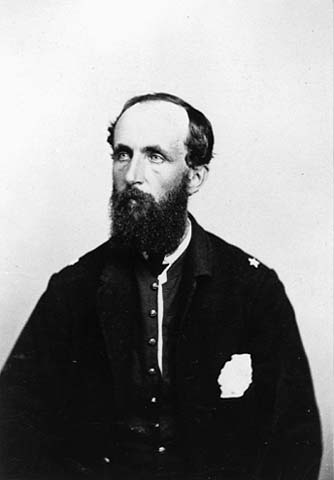
- Jennison c. 1865 by Joel Emmons Whitney

6th Minnesota Secretary of State
- In office 1872–1876
- Preceded by: Hans Mattson
- Succeeded by: John S. Irgens
- Governor: Horace Austin; Cushman K. Davis

Chief Clerk of the Minnesota House of Representatives
- In office 1867–1871
- Preceded by: Andrew C. Dunn
- Succeeded by: William R. Kinyon

Personal details
- Born: May 9, 1830 Stockbridge, Massachusetts
- Died: November 30, 1909 (aged 79) Covina, California
- Education: Harvard University
- Occupation: Lawyer, librarian, secretary, politician

Military service
- Allegiance: United States
- Branch/service: Union Army
- Years of service: 1861–1865
- Rank: Lieutenant Colonel; Brevet Brigadier General
- Unit: 2nd Minnesota Infantry Regiment; 10th Minnesota Infantry Regiment
- Commands: 10th Minnesota Infantry Regiment
- Battles/wars: American Civil War; Battle of Mill Springs; Siege of Corinth; Battle of Tupelo; Price's Missouri Expedition; Battle of Westport; Franklin-Nashville Campaign; Battle of Nashville (WIA); Mobile Campaign; Battle of Spanish Fort; Battle of Fort Blakeley; Dakota War of 1862; Sibley's 1863 Campaign; Battle of Big Mound; Battle of Dead Buffalo Lake; Battle of Stony Lake

Samuel Pearce Jennison (May 9, 1830 – November 30, 1909), sometimes written as Samuel Pierce Jennison, was a Minnesota politician, teacher, librarian, lawyer, and Brigadier General during the American Civil War. During his service in the Union army Jennison began his military career as the adjutant of the 2nd Minnesota Infantry Regiment, by the end of the war Jennison held the rank of Brigadier General. During his political career in Minnesota Jennison served as the Chief Clerk of the Minnesota House of Representatives, the Secretary of the Minnesota Senate, and served as the Minnesota Secretary of State.

== Early life ==
Samuel Pearce Jennison was born on May 9, 1830, in Stockbridge, Massachusetts, he was the son of James Jennison and Mary Lamb Jennison. Jennison received a common school education growing up and eventually studied at Harvard University. From a young age Jennison was an accomplished singer, although he did not seek a career in entertainment. Jennison first moved to New Hampshire where he was employed as a teacher and was later the principal of the high school in Concord, New Hampshire. Jennison eventually studied law under John B. Sanborn and C. C. Lund in New Hampshire and passed the New Hampshire bar in 1857.

In 1857 Jennison moved to Saint Paul in Minnesota Territory where he worked for the law office of Minnesota Associate Justice David Cooper. Together the two lawyers founded the law firm Cooper & Jennison. While in Minnesota Jennison also studied college-level law under Edward Duffield Neill. While in Minnesota Jennison became heavily involved in politics and was an ardent Republican. While visiting Concord, New Hampshire in August 1858 Jennison married Lucia A. Wood (1838–1922), together they had four sons.

In his free time Jennison helped to organize the Olympic Baseball Club of St. Paul alongside Russell C. Munger in December 1858, Jennison was also the first captain of the Olympic Baseball Club. The Olympic Baseball Club is recorded as one of St. Paul's first baseball teams. Governor Alexander Ramsey appointed Jennison as the head librarian of the Minnesota State Law Library from January 2, 1860 to January 24, 1861. From 1860 to 1861 Jennison also worked as the personal secretary of Governor Ramsey.

== American Civil War ==
=== 2nd Minnesota Infantry Regiment ===
At the outbreak of the American Civil War Jennison resigned from his clerical and library positions and enlisted into the Union army. On June 17, 1861 Jennison was enrolled into the ranks of Company D of the 2nd Minnesota Infantry Regiment as a Second Lieutenant under the command of Captain Horace Henry Western. Jennison was promoted to the rank of First Lieutenant on January 17, 1862 and was appointed as the Regimental Adjutant under Colonel Horatio P. Van Cleve. Jennison served with the 2nd Minnesota for its first two engagements at the Battle of Mill Springs and the Siege of Corinth. Jennison was eventually promoted to the rank of Lieutenant Colonel in August 1862 and was sent back to Minnesota to assist in raising the 10th Minnesota Infantry Regiment under Colonel James Heaton Baker.

=== 10th Minnesota Infantry Regiment ===
Jennison served as the Lieutenant Colonel of the 10th Minnesota from its muster in August 1862 until being mustered out in August 1865. The 10th Minnesota had been raised in Minnesota during the Dakota War of 1862 and portions of the unit, primarily Company B of the regiment, fought in several engagements including relieving the Battle of Fort Ridgely and the Battles of New Ulm, as well as fighting in the Battle of Acton, the Attack on Hutchinson, and the Battle of Wood Lake. Following the Dakota War Jennison fought in Sibley's 1863 Campaign against the Dakota people at the Battle of Big Mound where he led a battalion of the 10th Minnesota made up of companies A, C, F, and K. The 10th Minnesota would later take part in the Battle of Dead Buffalo Lake and the Battle of Stony Lake. In March 1864 Jennison was appointed by Clinton B. Fisk as the Provost marshal of Northern Missouri. Jennison later fought with the 10th Minnesota at the Battle of Tupelo from July 14–15, 1864 against Forrest's Cavalry Corps. During Price's Missouri Expedition Jennison and the 10th Minnesota fought under Colonel Joseph Jackson Woods as part of the First Division, 2nd Brigade of the XVI Corps at the Battle of Westport. Jennison later temporarily led the 10th Minnesota at the Battle of Nashville during the Franklin–Nashville campaign in December 1864 where he was shot in the head and wounded. Oscar Malmros, the Adjutant general of Minnesota notes the following about Jennison during Nashville:

"Every officer and man was at his post and nobly did his duty. Especially did its commander, Lieut. Col. Jennison, display a high order of those qualities requisite in an officer who wins battles over a brave and stubborn foe. His own personal bravery did very much in enabling him to carry, repeatedly, his regiment over the enemy's defenses. In the charge which decided the fate of the day, the last one made, he fell, severely wounded, in front of his command and within a yard of the enemy's works – Lieut. Col. Jennison, the commanding officer, was conspicuous for his high daring, and set a noble example to his officers and men. He fell, severely wounded, on the enemy's works – After Lieut. Col. Jennison fell, Captain Sanders was the ranking officer".

After being wounded at Nashville Jennison would recuperate until he rejoined the regiment on February 5, 1865. For his bravery at Nashville and continued leadership of the regiment Jennison was awarded with the brevet rank of Brigadier General on March 13, 1865. Jennison's appointment to Brigadier General, however, was not approved by the United States Senate until March 12, 1866. Jennison was mustered out of service with the rest of the 10th Minnesota at Fort Snelling on August 18, 1865.

In the immediate postwar era Jennison was a member of the Military Order of the Loyal Legion of the United States (MOLLUS), a Unionist fraternity and military order of Union Army officers which was founded on April 20, 1865 following the assassination of Abraham Lincoln. Jennison wrote an article in 1887 titled "The Illusions of a Soldier" which is featured in the 1887 book Glimpses of the Nations Struggle: a Series of Papers Read Before the Minnesota Commandery of the Military Order of the Loyal Legion of the United States.

== Political career ==
Following the war Jennison had an ample amount of influence, he used this to his advantage and worked in the field of Minnesota politics from 1867 until retiring to California in 1897. Jennison first served as the Chief Clerk of the Minnesota House of Representatives in 1867 during the 9th Minnesota Legislature, in 1868 during the 10th Minnesota Legislature, and in 1871 during the 13th Minnesota Legislature. Starting in 1871 Jennison ran for the office of Minnesota Secretary of State. Jennison won the 1871 Minnesota Secretary of State election against his Democratic political opponent Erik N. Falk. Jennison ran for a second term in the 1873 Minnesota Secretary of State election against Minnesota Democrat John H. Stevens. Later, from 1881 to 1882 Jennison served as the Secretary of the Minnesota Senate during the 22nd Minnesota Legislature. Aside from political offices, Jennison was also the private political secretary for the following Governors of Minnesota: Alexander Ramsey (1860–1861), William Rainey Marshall (1867–1870), and Lucius Frederick Hubbard (1882–1887).

== Other work and later life ==
In 1870 Jennison moved to Red Wing, Minnesota, where he worked for the Goodhue County Republican newspaper. He would ultimately be responsible for the consolidation of many of Red Wing's newspapers and started his own business, the Red Wing Printing Company. He later became the editor-in-chief of the Red Wing Republican newspaper until he resigned in 1894. Jennison moved to Covina, California in 1897, while in California he farmed citrus fruits and was the leader of the Covina Citrus Association of California. Jennison died on November 30, 1909 in Covina, California. His burial details are currently unknown.
