= Sidney Clarence Garrison =

American educator and psychologist (1885–1945)

- Born: October 17, 1885; Lincolnton, North Carolina, U.S.
- Died: January 18, 1945 (aged 59); Nashville, Tennessee, U.S.
- Resting place: Mount Olivet Cemetery
- Education: Wake Forest University
- Occupations: Educator, psychologist, university administrator
- Known for: Second President of Peabody College
- Spouse: Sara Elizabeth McMurry
- Children: 4 sons, 1 daughter

Sidney Clarence Garrison (October 17, 1885 –January 18, 1945) was an American educator and psychologist. He served as the second President of Peabody College (now part of Vanderbilt University) from 1938 to 1945. He was the (co-)author of several books about education.

== Early life ==
Sidney Clarence Garrison was born on October 17, 1885, in Lincolnton, North Carolina. His father was Rufus J. Garrison and his mother, Susie Elizabeth Mooney. He had a brother, Karl C. Garrison, who became a psychologist.

Garrison was educated at the Salem School in Lincolnton and South Fork Institute in Marion. He graduated from Wake Forest University in 1911, where he received a Bachelor of Arts degree, and he went on to receive a Master of Arts degree in 1913. During that time, he was also a schoolteacher and superintendent in Crouse, North Carolina, in the early 1910s. Planning to study medicine, Garrison enrolled at the Peabody College, where he changed his mind and received another master's degree in educational psychology in 1916 instead. During World War I, Garrison served as a captain in the United States Army. He served in the Walter Reed Hospital in Washington, D.C. and helped create the Alpha Intelligence Test. After his service, he returned to Peabody College, where he received a PhD in Psychology in 1919.

== Academic career ==
Garrison was professor of Educational Psychology at Peabody College from 1919 to 1934. He served as Dean of the Graduate School from 1934 to 1938. A few months after the 1937 death of President Bruce Ryburn Payne, Garrison was appointed President of Peabody College, serving from 1938 to 1945, in the midst of World War II. During his tenure as president, he expanded the Departments of Business Education, Home Economics, and Music. He helped establish the Joint University Library, which enabled faculty and students at Peabody College, Vanderbilt University, and Scarritt Bennett to borrow books from either library. Furthermore, he encouraged a closer collaboration between Peabody College and Vanderbilt University.

Garrison published several books. His 1919 PhD thesis, Variation in Achievement and Ability within the Grades, was published in 1922. Additionally, he co-authored two books of psychology with his brother, Karl C. Garrison. He also wrote spelling books with Bruce Ryburn Payne and Beatrice Irene Bryan.

Garrison was a Fellow of the American Association for the Advancement of Science. He was also a member of the American Psychological Association, the American Association of Psychology and Philosophy, and the American Educational Research Association. Moreover, he was a member of Phi Beta Kappa, Phi Delta Kappa, and Kappa Delta Pi.

== Business and philanthropy ==
Garrison served on the boards of directors of the Guaranty Trust Company and the Nashville Trust Company. Additionally, he served on the board of the Nashville Area Chamber of Commerce.

Garrison served on the Tennessee State Board of Education, the Nashville Area Council of the Boy Scouts of America, and the Board of Trustees of Meharry Medical College, a historically black medical school in Nashville. He served on the board of directors of the Southern Education Foundation, a non-profit organization which supports African-American education in the South.

== Personal life ==
Garrison married Sara Elizabeth McMurry of Guthrie, Kentucky, on October 16, 1918. They had four sons, Sidney Clarence Garrison Jr., William Louis Garrison, Frank McMurry Garrison, and Rufus James Garrison, and a daughter, Lucy Fuqua Garrison Crabb.

Garrison was a Southern Baptist. He was a member of the Baptist Sunday School Board, and a deacon of the First Baptist Church of Nashville.

== Death and legacy ==
Garrison died of a heart attack on January 18, 1945, in Nashville, Tennessee. His funeral took place in the Social-Religious Building of Peabody College, and he was buried at Mount Olivet Cemetery. On May 9, 1946, Horace Greeley Hill Jr. donated a portrait of Garrison painted by Max Westfield to Peabody College. Several decades later, in 1979, Peabody College was acquired by Vanderbilt University. His portrait can be seen in the Wyatt Center on the Peabody campus of Vanderbilt University.

== Works ==
- Garrison, S. C. (1922). Variation in Achievement and Ability within the Grades. Nashville, Tennessee: George Peabody College for Teachers. OCLC 1878946.
- Garrison, S. C.; Garrison, Karl C. (1929). The Psychology of Elementary School Subjects. Richmond, Virginia: Johnson Publishing Company. OCLC 1616526.
- Garrison, S. C.; Payne, Bruce Ryburn (1931). The Payne-Garrison Speller. New York: Chicago Rand, McNally & Co. OCLC 613009403.
- Garrison, S. C.; Bryan, Beatrice Irene (1932). A Language Speller for Junior High Schools. New York: Rand, McNally & Co. OCLC 679541904.
- Garrison, S. C.; Garrison, Karl C. (1936). Fundamentals of Psychology in Secondary Education. New York: Prentice-Hall. OCLC 764635.
