= Chittenden (CDP), Vermont =

Census-designated place in Vermont, United States

Chittenden, Vermont
- Census-designated place
- Location within Vermont Location within the United States
- Coordinates: 43°42′12″N 72°56′58″W
- Country: United States
- State: Vermont
- County: Rutland
- Town: Chittenden

Area
  - Total: 0.49 sq mi (1.27 km^{2})
  - Land: 0.49 sq mi (1.27 km^{2})
  - Water: 0 sq mi (0.0 km^{2})
- Elevation: 1,142 ft (348 m)

Population (2020)
  - Total: 136
- Time zone: UTC-5 (Eastern (EST))
  - Summer (DST): UTC-4 (EDT)
- ZIP Code: 05737
- Area code: 802
- FIPS code: 50-14275
- GNIS feature ID: 2807146

Chittenden is the primary village and a census-designated place (CDP) in the town of Chittenden, Rutland County, Vermont, United States. As of the 2020 census, it had a population of 136, out of 1,237 in the entire town.

== Geography ==
The CDP is in northeastern Rutland County, in the southwest part of the town. It sits at the western foot of the Green Mountains, in the valley of East Creek, which flows south through Rutland to join Otter Creek, a north-flowing tributary of Lake Champlain.

The village is served by East Pittsford-Chittenden Road, which leads south 2.5 miles (4.0 km) to East Pittsford. Downtown Rutland is 8 miles (13 km) south of Chittenden.
