= Francis Furman =

American businessman

- Born: 1816
- Died: 1899 (aged 82–83)
- Resting place: Mount Olivet Cemetery
- Occupation: Businessman
- Spouse: Mary J. Gilliam
- Children: Charles Furman; William G. Furman

Francis Furman (1816–1899) was an American businessman in Nashville, Tennessee.

== Early life ==
Francis Furman was born in 1816.

== Career ==
Furman was a successful dry goods merchant in Nashville, Tennessee. In 1850, he was a partner in a dry goods store with R. C. McNairy and George S. Whitman called McNairy, Furman & Co. By 1861, at the outset of the American Civil War, Furman dissolved his business, Furman & Co., which he co-owned with George Searight, James M. Goodloe, and Andrew Campbetl.

After the war, he was the co-owner of Furman, Green & Co., another drygoods store with Frank W. Green, until 1869, when they closed down the business. That same year, he opened another business on Cedar Street, Furman & Co. A year later, in 1870, he renamed it Furman & Co. Wholesale Dry Goods and Notions, and move it to Nashville's Public Square, where it existed until 1890.

== Personal life ==
Furman was married to Irish-born Mary J. Gilliam (1828-1900). They resided on North Cherry Street in Nashville. In 1859, they had a son, Charles Furman, who died as an infant. His funeral was conducted by Alexander Little Page Green. Their second son, William G. Furman, was born in 1856 and died in 1900.

== Death and legacy ==
Furman died in 1899. He was buried in the Mount Olivet Cemetery in Nashville, where his tomb was designed by Danish-born sculptor Johannes Gelert (1852-1923). It is the largest tomb in the cemetery.

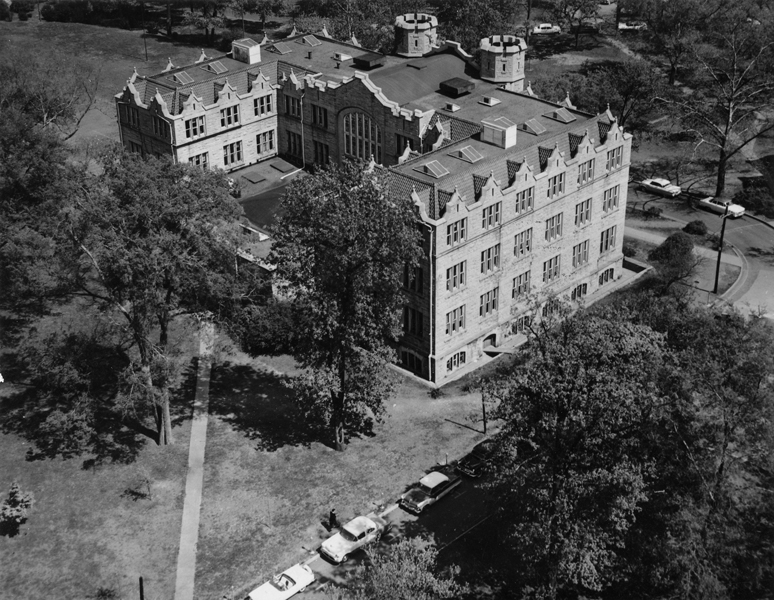
Furman Hall on the campus of Vanderbilt University

Furman Hall on the campus of Vanderbilt University in Nashville is named in his honor. It was the result of a US$100,000 donation by his widow after his death, even though he never attended the university. Inside the building, there is a sculpture of Francis Furman. From 1907 to 1967, it housed the Chemistry and Physics Department. Since 1967, it has been home to the Humanities Department.
