= 1871 Minnesota Secretary of State election =

- November 7, 1871
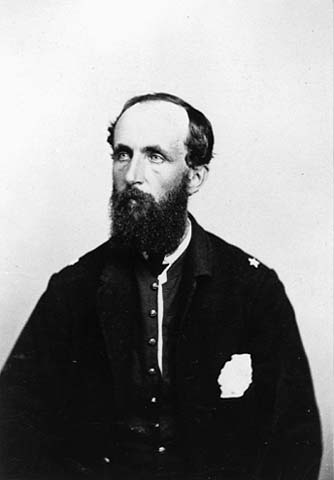

Nominee	Samuel P. Jennison	Erik N. Falk
Party	Republican	Democratic
Popular vote	44,789	32,287
Percentage	58.01%	41.82%
Secretary of State before election
Hans Mattson
Republican
Elected Secretary of State
Samuel P. Jennison
Republican

The 1871 Minnesota Secretary of State election was held on November 7, 1871, in order to elect the Secretary of State of Minnesota. Republican nominee Samuel P. Jennison defeated Democratic nominee Erik N. Falk and Temperance nominee Jonas Guilford.

== General election ==
On election day, November 7, 1871, Republican nominee Samuel P. Jennison won the election by a margin of 12,502 votes against his foremost opponent Democratic nominee Erik N. Falk, thereby retaining Republican control over the office of Secretary of State. Jennison was sworn in as the 6th Minnesota Secretary of State on January 9, 1872.

=== Results ===
Minnesota Secretary of State election, 1871
Party	Candidate	Votes	%
Republican	Samuel P. Jennison	44,789	58.01
Democratic	Erik N. Falk	32,287	41.82
Prohibition	Jonas Guilford	130	0.17
Total votes		77,206	100.00
Republican hold			
