= Johannes Gelert =

American sculptor

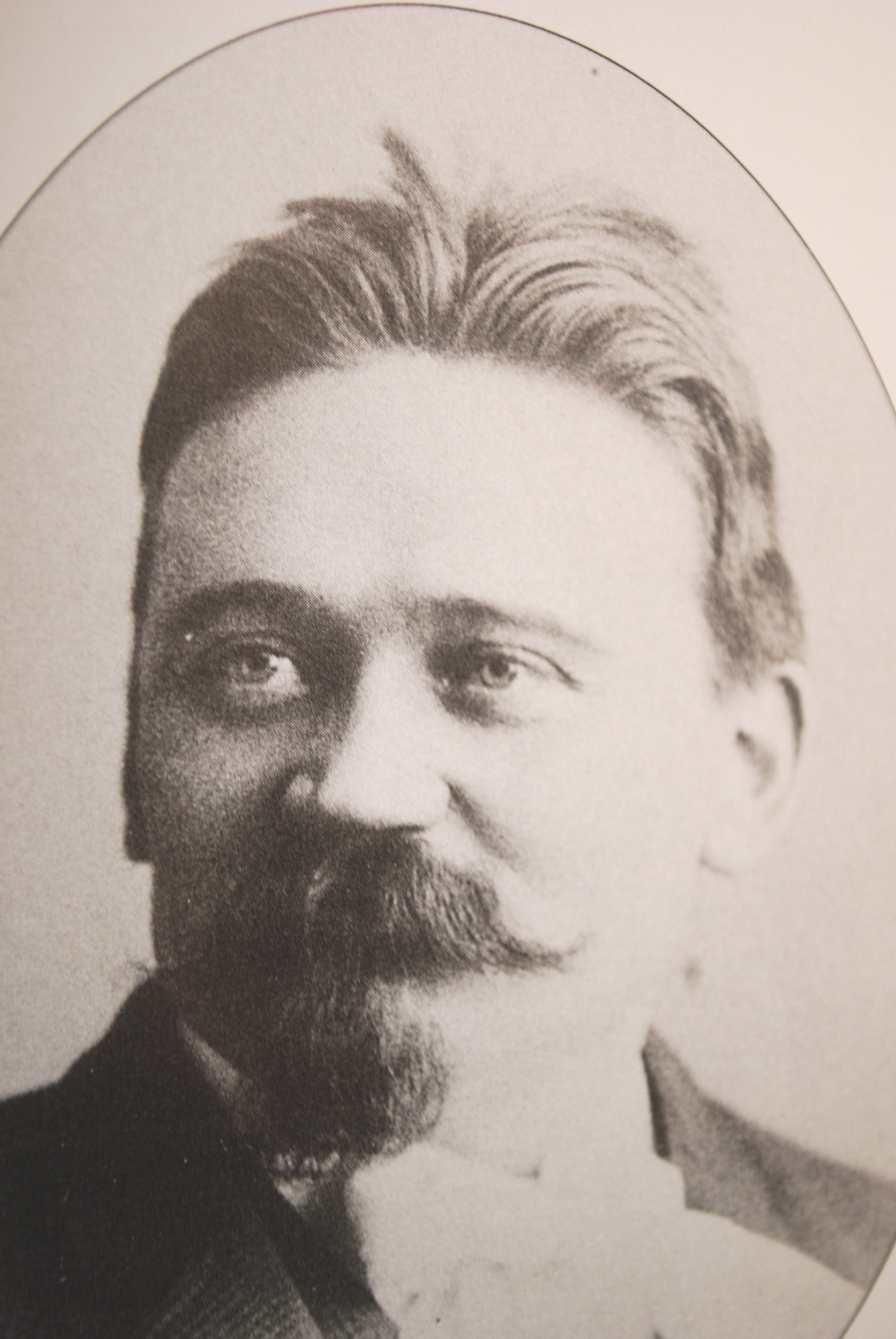
- Born: December 10, 1852; Nybøl, Sundeved (Denmark)
- Died: November 3, 1923 (aged 70); New York City, US
- Occupation: Sculptor
- Spouse: Georgine Sundberg (m. 1896)
- Children: 3

Johannes Sophus Gelert (1852–1923) was a Danish-born sculptor, who came to the United States in 1887 and during a span of more than thirty years produced numerous works of civic art in the Midwest and on the East Coast.

== Biography ==
Johannes Gelert was born December 10, 1852, in the town of Nybøl in southern Denmark. He demonstrated an early talent for art and, after moving with his family to Copenhagen in 1866, was apprenticed to a woodcarver. In 1870, he enrolled in the Royal Danish Academy of Fine Arts, where he graduated with honors in 1875. For the next ten years, he worked and studied in Denmark, Sweden, Germany, France and Italy, becoming a protégé of some of Europe's leading sculptors.

Immigrating to America in 1887, Gelert established his studios in Chicago. He became a citizen of the United States in 1892 and, four years later, married Georgine Sundberg, with whom he had three children. He moved his studios to New York City in 1898 and lived there until his death on November 3, 1923.

== Exhibitions and awards ==
Gelert exhibited his sculpture at several notable events: the 1893 World's Columbian Exposition in Chicago, the 1901 Pan-American Exposition in Buffalo, the 1904 Louisiana Purchase Exposition in St. Louis and the 1915 Panama–Pacific International Exposition in San Francisco.

A three-time gold medal winner, he received top honors for "Wounded American Soldier" at the 1897 Tennessee Centennial and International Exposition in Nashville, "Little Architect" at the 1899 Exhibition of the Art Club of Philadelphia and "Theseus, Victor over the Minotaur" at the 1902 Exhibition of the American Art Society in Philadelphia.

== Public displays of his art ==
In 1890 Gelert created a bronze statue of President Ulysses S. Grant. That statue was financed and commissioned by Chicago Time-Herald publisher, Herman H. Kohlsaat. Gelert had moved to New York at the time of his commission. Gelert's statue of Grant was displayed and dedicated at Grant Park in Galena Illinois on June 3, 1891. Grant is displayed as a citizen standing having his right hand in his pocket. Gelert told city officials that the statue was to depict Grant as a private citizen of Galena "as you knew him..." Grant's widow, Julia Grant, was critical of Grant holding his hand in his pocket, but she approved the final version of the statue.

Johannes Gelert's 1912 statue of John H. Stevens, an early settler in Minneapolis, was based on drawings by the Norwegian-born sculptor Jacob Fjelde. Originally located in downtown Minneapolis, it was later moved to one of the city's most popular parks. Other works by Gelert are found at frequently visited attractions throughout the country: the Brooklyn Museum, Chicago's Auditorium Theatre and Lincoln Park and the St. Louis Art Museum. He also designed the tomb of businessman Francis Furman, which is the largest memorial at Mount Olivet Cemetery in Nashville.

There is, however, limited public access to one of his best-known pieces. Gelert's Haymarket Memorial, showing a Chicago policeman with an upraised arm, was unveiled in Haymarket Square on May 30, 1889. After being struck by a streetcar, defaced with black paint and targeted with bomb attacks during the Vietnam War, it was moved to the headquarters of the Chicago Police Department in the early 1970s, where it has remained in secure locations ever since.

Historians and scholars note that Gelert's works displayed contemporary and interesting themes of economic class, labor, and social movements.

== Lost works ==
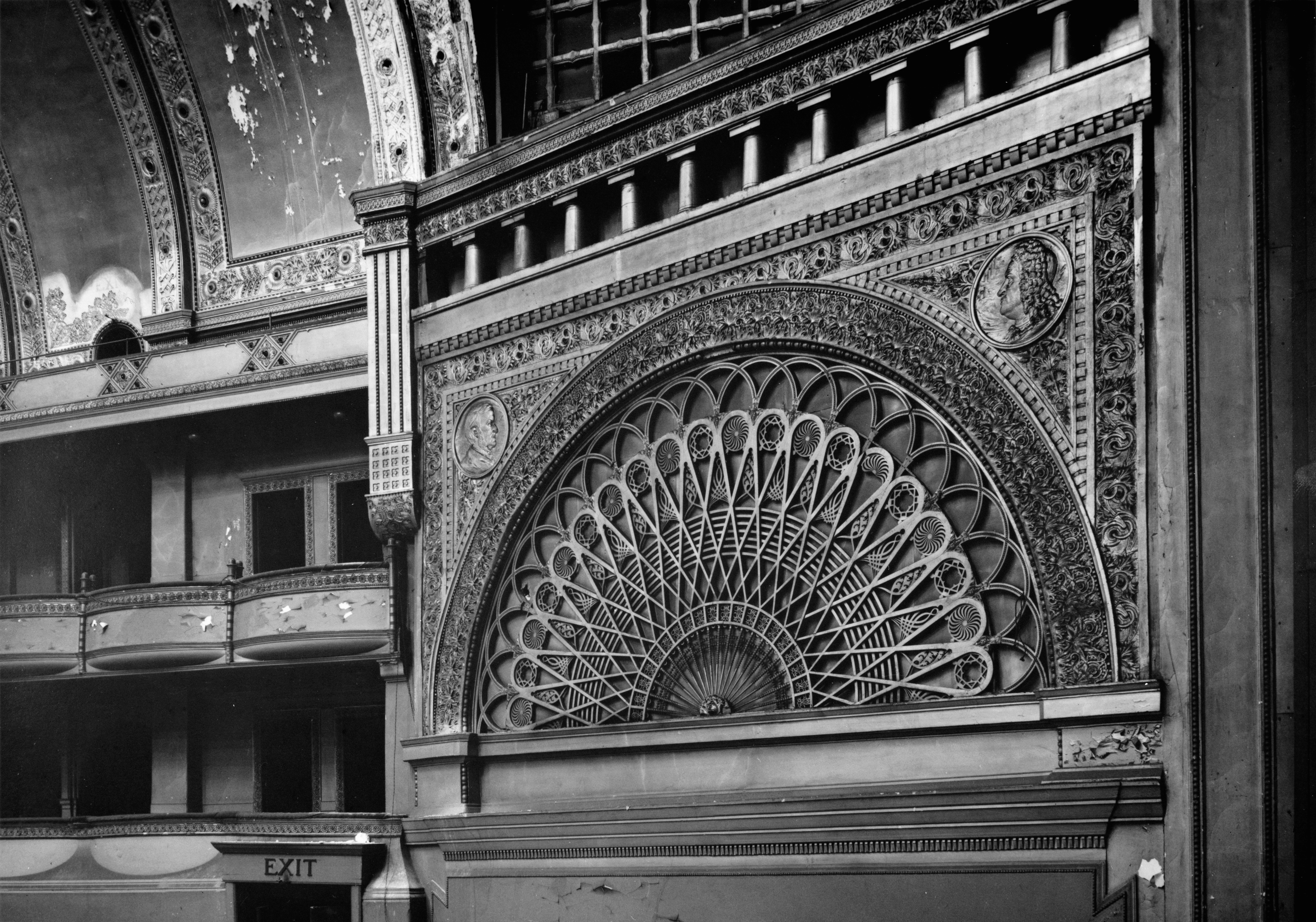
Portrait medallions at the Auditorium Theatre 1963

After major fire damage in 1890, McVicker's Theatre in Chicago was redesigned by the architectural firm of Adler and Sullivan. Johannes Gelert contributed two panels in bas-relief: "one depicting the march of LaSalle, which was the entrance of Christianity into Illinois, the other symbolizing in a picture of the Fort Dearborn massacre the final struggle of savagery to hold its own against the new civilization of the State." Dating from 1872, the building was demolished in 1922 to make way for the third version of McVicker's Theatre, a movie palace that lasted until 1984 and was taken down the following year.

A bronze bust of Beethoven, created by Gelert in 1897, stood in Lincoln Park for over seventy years. Stolen in 1971, a fragment of the base remains.

In 1899 Gelert was one of twenty-eight sculptors working on the Dewey Arch, which honored Admiral George Dewey and his victory in the Battle of Manila Bay the previous year. The monument, erected for a parade on September 30, 1899, was made of staff, a material often used for temporary structures at international fairs and expositions. Soon after the celebration the arch began to deteriorate. When funds could not be raised to remake it with durable materials, the arch was destroyed.

== See also ==
- Haymarket memorials

== Gallery ==
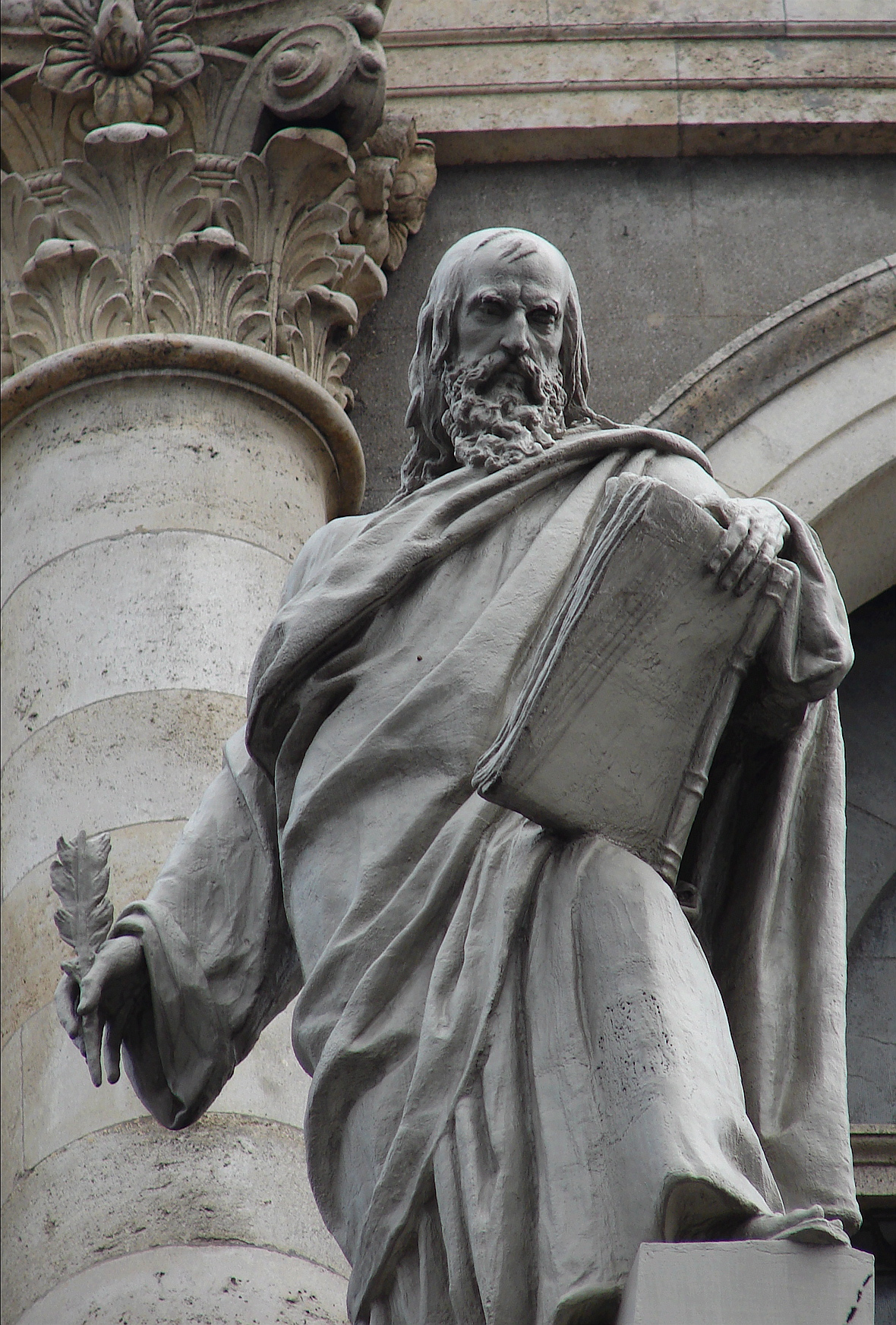
St. Augustine at Frederik's Church in Copenhagen, 1885

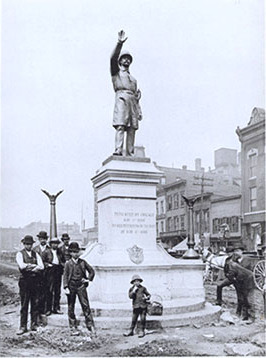
Haymarket Memorial in Chicago, 1889

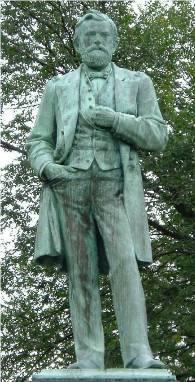
Bronze statue of Ulysses S. Grant Grant Park Galena, Illinois, 1890

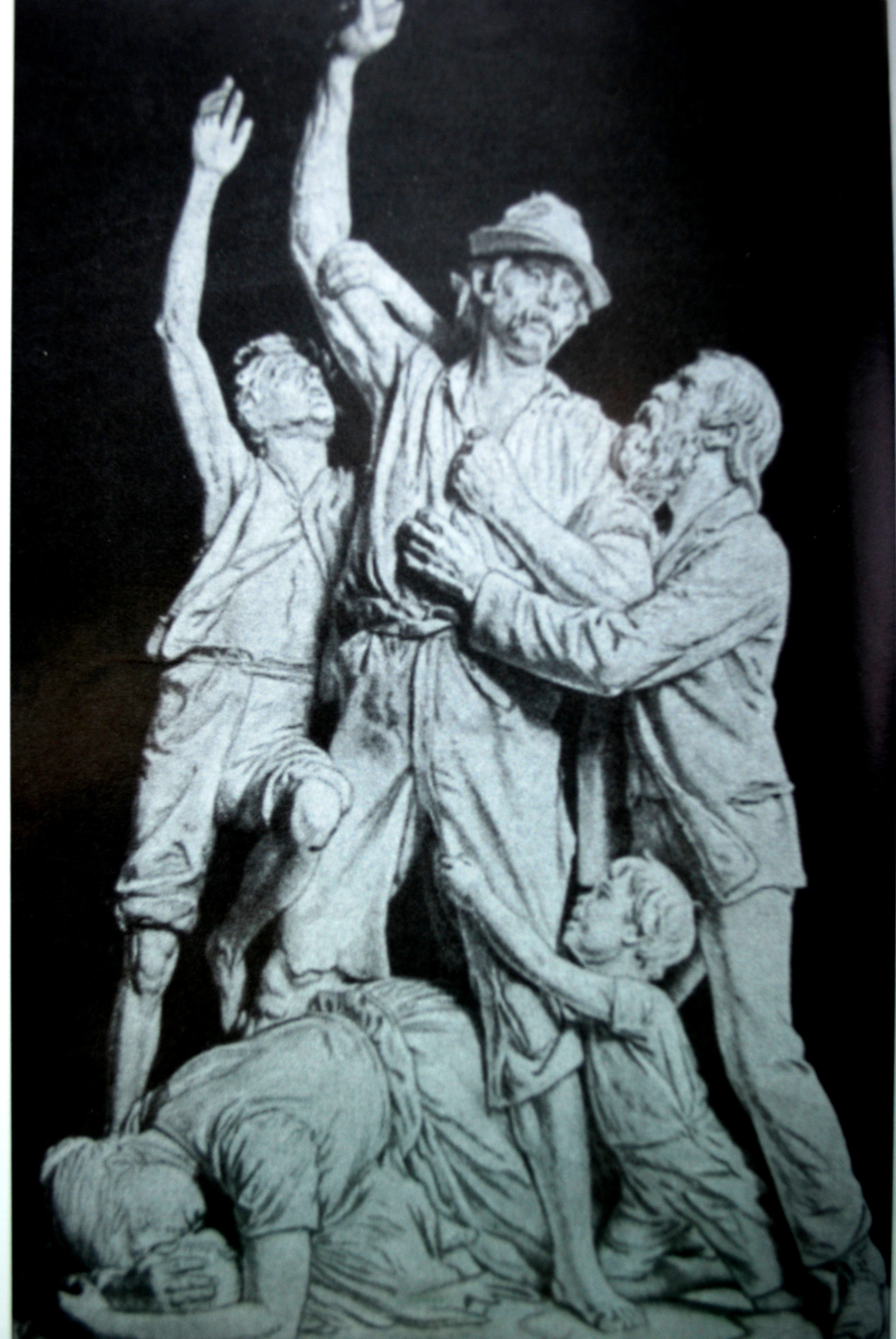
The Struggle for Work at the Chicago World's Fair, 1893

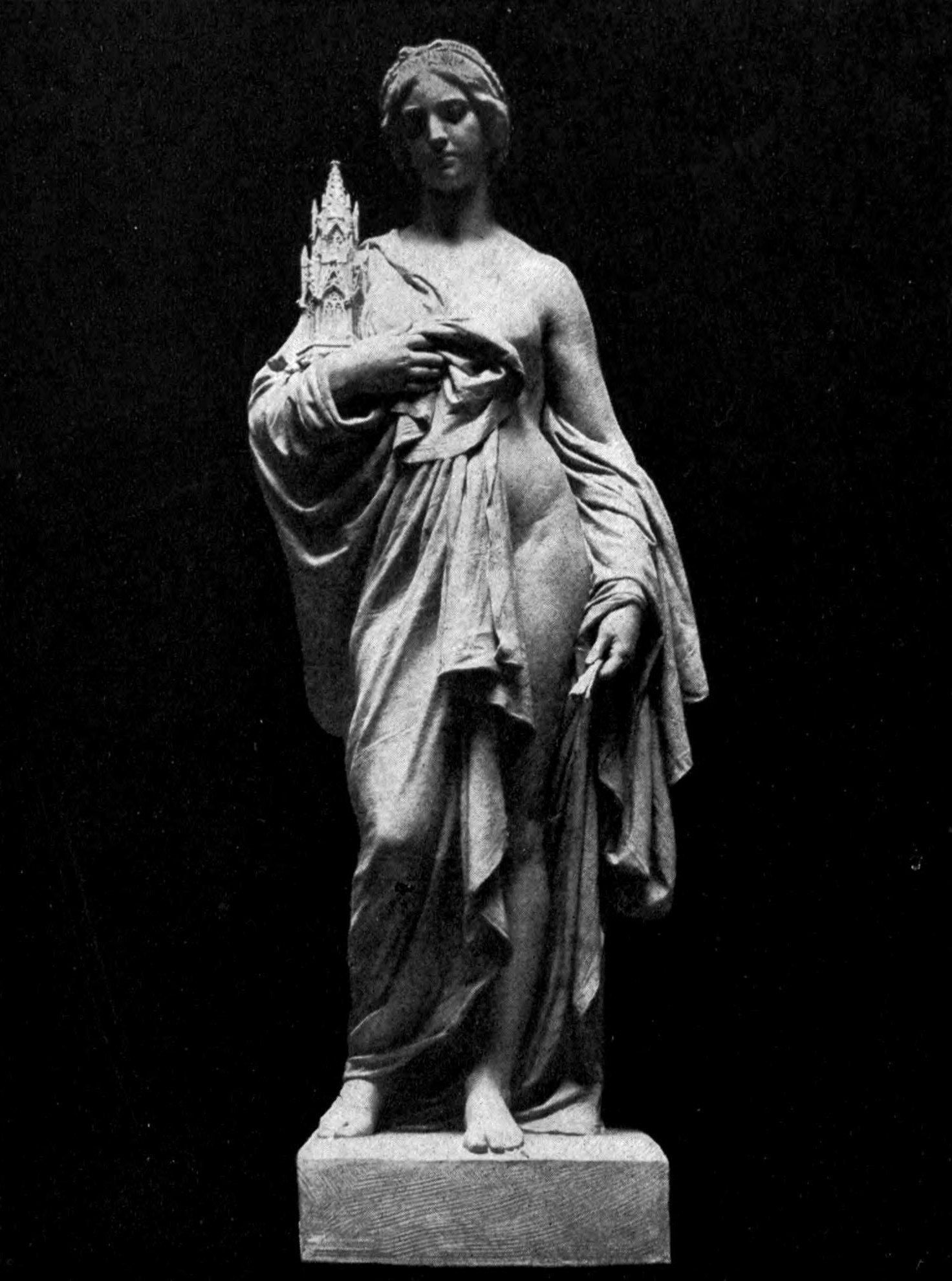
Gothic art at the St. Louis World's Fair, 1904
