= Jesse Babcock Ferguson =

Jesse Babcock Ferguson (January 19, 1819 – September 3 or September 4, 1870) was an American Christian preacher who developed Spiritualist leanings in the 1840s and 1850s while serving as the preacher at the Nashville, Tennessee Church of Christ.

== Biography ==
Ferguson edited a periodical called The Christian Magazine and drew large numbers into the church with his powerful preaching, leading to congregational growth and the construction of a new church building. He was eventually expelled from the Nashville Church of Christ in April 1857 for his public advocacy of Spiritualism; the new church building burned shortly after that under suspicious circumstances. Ferguson's beliefs and their upshot led some of the members of the Nashville Church of Christ who had not agreed with Ferguson's Spiritualism to make stronger affirmation of orthodoxy a requirement for future ministers; among the leaders of this strain of belief was Tolbert Fanning, who used the Ferguson incident to enforce his own conservative beliefs as the norm for the group.

Ferguson later travelled to England in the company of the Davenport brothers to demonstrate supposed supernatural phenomena. He worked as their stage manager but they were exposed as frauds. Ferguson also became convinced of the eventual salvation of all souls through divine grace, the doctrine of Universalism, and was active in the Universalist faith in his later years.

Ferguson is buried in Nashville's Mount Olivet Cemetery.

== Selected publications ==
- Spirit Communion (1855)
- Nationality Versus sectionalism (1866)
