= Chittenden, Vermont =

- Town
- Seal

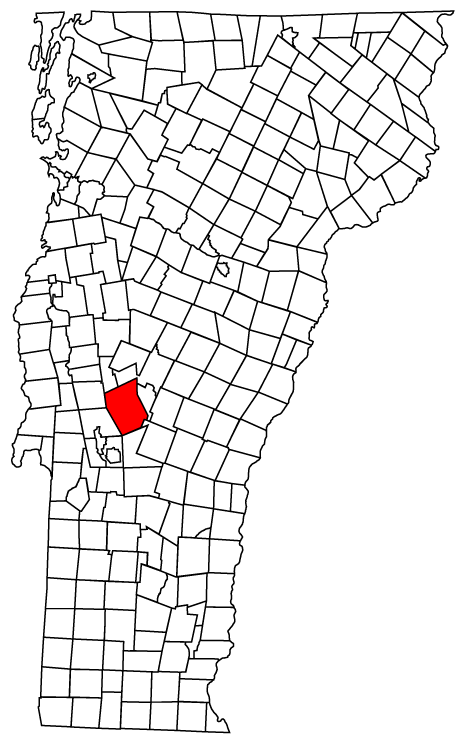
- Chittenden, Vermont
- Coordinates: 43°45′35″N 72°55′15″W
- Country: United States
- State: Vermont
- County: Rutland
- Communities: Chittenden; North Chittenden

Area
  - Total: 74.2 sq mi (192.2 km^{2})
  - Land: 73.0 sq mi (189.1 km^{2})
  - Water: 1.2 sq mi (3.1 km^{2})
- Elevation: 2,198 ft (670 m)

Population (2020)
  - Total: 1,237
  - Density: 16.94/sq mi (6.542/km^{2})
- Time zone: UTC-5 (Eastern (EST))
  - Summer (DST): UTC-4 (EDT)
- ZIP Codes: 05737 (Chittenden); 05763 (North Chittenden); 05701 (South Chittenden)
- Area code: 802
- FIPS code: 50-14350
- GNIS feature ID: 1462071
- Website: townofchittenden.com

Chittenden (/ˈtʃɪtəndən/) is a town in Rutland County, Vermont, United States. The population was 1,237 at the 2020 census.

== History ==
Chittenden was named after Thomas Chittenden, one of the Green Mountain Boys and governor of both the independent Vermont Republic, and later, the state of Vermont. Chittenden and his son Noah were among the town's principal land grantees, although the governor may have never visited the area.

== Geography ==
According to the United States Census Bureau, the town has a total area of 74.2 square miles (192.2 km^{2}), of which 73.0 square miles (189.1 km^{2}) is land and 1.2 square miles (3.1 km^{2} or 1.62%) is water. It is the largest town by area in Vermont, slightly larger than Stowe in Lamoille County.

The town is split in two by a ridge of the Green Mountains, and only the western half of the town is settled. The village of Chittenden is in the southwest corner of the town. Much of the town remains unbroken forest.

=== Climate ===
This climatic region is typified by large seasonal temperature differences, with warm to hot (and often humid) summers and cold (sometimes severely cold) winters. According to the Köppen Climate Classification system, Chittenden has a humid continental climate, abbreviated "Dfb" on climate maps.

== Demographics ==
Historical population
Census	Pop.	Note	%±
1790	159		—
1800	327		105.7%
1810	446		36.4%
1820	528		18.4%
1830	610		15.5%
1840	644		5.6%
1850	675		4.8%
1860	763		13.0%
1870	802		5.1%
1880	1,092		36.2%
1890	730		−33.2%
1900	621		−14.9%
1910	563		−9.3%
1920	472		−16.2%
1930	341		−27.8%
1940	379		11.1%
1950	424		11.9%
1960	460		8.5%
1970	646		40.4%
1980	927		43.5%
1990	1,102		18.9%
2000	1,182		7.3%
2010	1,258		6.4%
2020	1,237		−1.7%
U.S. Decennial Census

At the 2000 census, there were 1,182 people, 451 households and 345 families residing in the town. The population density was 16.2 per square mile (6.3/km^{2}). There were 585 housing units at an average density of 8.0 per square mile (3.1/km^{2}). The racial makeup of the town was 98.48% White, 0.17% African American, 0.17% Asian, 0.08% Pacific Islander, and 1.10% from two or more races. Hispanic or Latino of any race were 0.25% of the population.

There were 451 households, of which 37.3% had children under the age of 18 living with them, 64.1% were married couples living together, 7.3% had a female householder with no husband present, and 23.5% were non-families. 18.6% of all households were made up of individuals, and 6.4% had someone living alone who was 65 years of age or older. The average household size was 2.62 and the average family size was 2.97.

26.3% of the population were under the age of 18, 5.8% from 18 to 24, 29.2% from 25 to 44, 30.3% from 45 to 64, and 8.4% who were 65 years of age or older. The median age was 40 years. For every 100 females, there were 99.3 males. For every 100 females age 18 and over, there were 100.7 males.

The median household income was $45,313 and the median family income was $52,596. Males had a median income of $35,556 versus $31,776 for females. The per capita income for the town was $21,278. About 2.9% of families and 6.2% of the population were below the poverty line, including 6.1% of those under age 18 and 5.2% of those age 65 or over.

== Notable people ==
- Horatio Eddy and William Eddy, traveling sideshow psychic twins

== See also ==
- List of municipalities in Vermont
