= George A. Dickel =

German-born American businessman

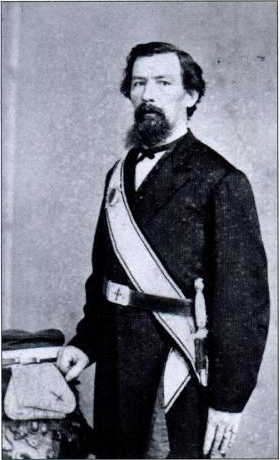
- Dickel, photographed by Carl Giers
- Born: Georg Augustus Dickel; February 2, 1818; Grünberg, Grand Duchy of Hesse, German Confederation
- Died: June 11, 1894 (aged 76); Nashville, Tennessee, United States
- Resting place: Mount Olivet Cemetery; Nashville, Tennessee
- Occupation: Liquor distributor
- Spouse: Augusta Banzer

George Augustus Dickel (February 2, 1818 – June 11, 1894) was a German-born American businessman best known for his namesake brand of whiskey, George Dickel, one of two major brands of Tennessee whiskey. Though he was not the distiller of the whiskey, which was originally sold under the brand name "Cascade", his wholesaling firm played an important role in its distribution and marketing, and his name appeared on its labels throughout the late 19th and early 20th centuries. When Cascade's new owners reopened the original Cascade Hollow distillery in the 1950s, they renamed the whiskey for Dickel.

Though he valued anonymity and preferred to work in the background in business dealings, Dickel was a prominent resident of his adopted hometown of Nashville, Tennessee. He owned a number of smaller business enterprises, at various times, in addition to his liquor wholesaling business.

== Early life ==
Dickel was born out of wedlock to Elisabeth Dickel in Grünberg, Hesse (in modern Germany). He is believed to have been the illegitimate son of Anton Fischer, who lived in Marktheidenfeld. He was named after his godfather (and probable uncle) Georg Adam Fischer. Anton Fischer's father, Adam Fischer, was a Würzburg-area master cooper who specialized in wine casks. Dickel migrated to the United States in 1844, and relocated to Nashville in 1847.

By the mid-1850s, Dickel was operating a boot and shoe manufacturing business on Union Street in Nashville. He continued in this line of work until about 1860. During this period, he married Augusta Banzer, who was twenty years his junior. Dickel first began selling liquor in 1861.

During the Civil War, rampant smuggling took place in Nashville after Union soldiers occupied the city in 1862 and banned the sale of liquor. While there is no direct evidence linking Dickel to wartime smuggling, the Schwabs, a family of Alsatian immigrants with whom Dickel would long be associated, were heavily involved in Nashville's illicit whiskey trade. A son-in-law of Abram Schwab, Meier Salzkotter (1822–1891), who had been a business associate of Dickel since 1859, was caught by Union authorities in possession of a large quantity of contraband liquor. Salzkotter argued that his in-laws had saddled him with the whiskey, but was nevertheless arrested and jailed. Upon his release, he divorced his wife, Cecilia Schwab.

== Liquor wholesaling and other endeavors ==
At the end of the war in 1865, Dickel opened a liquor store on South College Street in Nashville. He had relocated to South Market Street (modern Second Avenue) by the following year. He hired Salzkotter as a superintendent, and Salzkotter's former brother-in-law, Victor Emmanuel Shwab (1847–1924), as a bookkeeper. Shwab, who had dropped the "c" from his surname in an attempt to Americanize it, would eventually marry Emma Banzer, a sister of Dickel's wife, Augusta. In 1867, Dickel began blending whiskey, and was arrested and charged in federal court for rectifying liquor without a license. In spite of these charges, Dickel's liquor retail continued to thrive.

By 1870, Dickel had established a liquor wholesaling firm, George A. Dickel and Company, which was headquartered at 2 North Market Street. Typical of liquor wholesalers of the day, Dickel and Company purchased whiskey directly from distillers from around the region, and sold it in barrels, jugs and bottles. The company also sold beer from Nashville-area brewers, including ales and lagers produced by South Nashville brewer Stifel and Pfeiffer, as well as wines and brandies. The company was one of the first in Nashville to directly import liquor, including Scottish and Irish whiskeys, Dutch gin, and champagnes. An 1875 advertisement described the company's specialties as "copper distilled sour mash whiskies" and imported champagnes, and noted the company shipped nationwide.

On March 17, 1874, a fire swept through Market Street, destroying the Dickel and Company headquarters, and just missing its large warehouse, which was filled with $60,000 worth of whiskey. Another fire in May 1881 destroyed the warehouse, however, which represented for the company a $75,000 loss (though partially insured). In reporting on this second fire, one newspaper described Dickel as "the great whiskey dealer". In 1882, Dickel and Company built a new five-story headquarters on Market Street.

While it's unknown when exactly Dickel and Company began distributing whiskey produced at the Cascade Hollow distillery near Tullahoma, there is no evidence to support the oft-told story that Dickel established the distillery while on a trip to the area in 1870. John F. Brown and F.E. Cunningham were operating a distillery in the valley by 1879, when Brown sold his shares to Matthew Sims. In 1883, McLin Davis became the Cascade operation's distiller, and instituted a number of innovations that greatly increased the whiskey's quality. Shwab, who had become a full partner in Dickel and Company in 1881, purchased Sims's share of the distillery in 1888. With this purchase, Dickel and Company became Cascade's sole distributor.

Along with his successful liquor enterprise, Dickel was engaged in a number of endeavors in Nashville. He lived just outside the city in a home on Dickerson Pike, where he operated a sizable pear orchard. He was also a volunteer fireman with Nashville's Deluge Company No. 3. Dickel became a Master Mason in 1852, and was a member of the Knights Templar. He endorsed photographer and fellow German-American Carl Giers for the state legislature in 1874.

In 1886, Dickel was badly injured in a horse-riding accident, and never fully recovered. His health declined rapidly during the last two years of his life, and he died on June 11, 1894. He is interred in Nashville's Mount Olivet Cemetery.

== Legacy ==
As Dickel's health declined, Shwab gradually took over Dickel and Company's daily operations. Dickel's will left his share of the company to his wife, Augusta, with instructions to sell it at the first opportunity. While she declined to sell, she took no active part in the company's operations, and spent her later years dividing her time between Nashville, her summer home in Charlevoix, Michigan, and annual trips to Europe. Upon her death in 1916, she left her share of the company to Shwab.

As the distributor of the increasingly popular Cascade brand, Dickel and Company's name appeared on the Cascade label into the 20th century, when the operation was forced to close with the onset of prohibition. In the late 1950s, Schenley Industries, which had bought the Cascade brand from Shwab's descendants, rebuilt the Cascade Hollow distillery, and renamed the brand "George Dickel". A bust and monument to Dickel now stands outside the general store and visitors' center at the new distillery.

Dickel and Company's headquarters, built in 1882, still stands at 201–203 Second Avenue in Nashville.

== See also ==
- Outline of whisky
