= 1873 Minnesota Secretary of State election =

- November 4, 1873
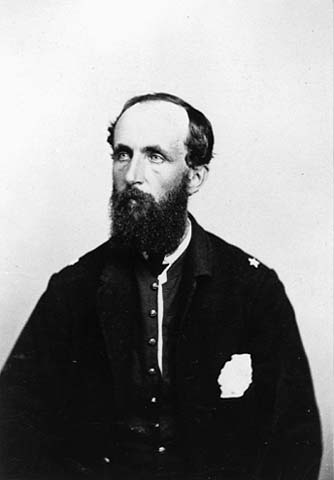

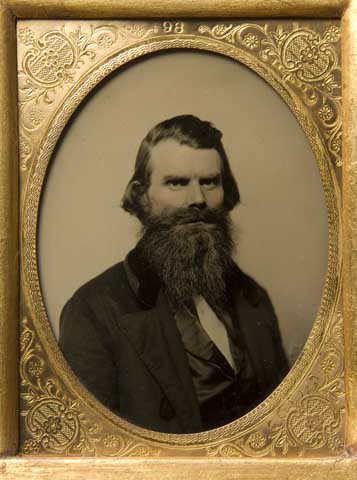
Nominee	Samuel P. Jennison	John H. Stevens
Party	Republican	Democratic
Popular vote	38,654	38,094
Percentage	50.37%	49.63%
Secretary of State before election
Samuel P. Jennison
Republican
Elected Secretary of State
Samuel P. Jennison
Republican

The 1873 Minnesota Secretary of State election was held on November 4, 1873, in order to elect the Secretary of State of Minnesota. Republican nominee and incumbent Secretary of State Samuel P. Jennison defeated Democratic nominee and former member of the Minnesota Senate John H. Stevens.

== General election ==
On election day, November 4, 1873, Republican nominee Samuel P. Jennison won re-election by a margin of 560 votes against his opponent Democratic nominee John H. Stevens, thereby retaining Republican control over the office of Secretary of State. Jennison was sworn in for his second term on January 7, 1874.

=== Results ===
Minnesota Secretary of State election, 1873
Party	Candidate	Votes	%
Republican	Samuel P. Jennison (incumbent)	38,654	50.37
Democratic	John H. Stevens	38,094	49.63
Total votes		76,748	100.00
Republican hold			
