= Mount Olivet Cemetery (Nashville) =

Historic cemetery in Tennessee, US

- U.S. National Register of Historic Places
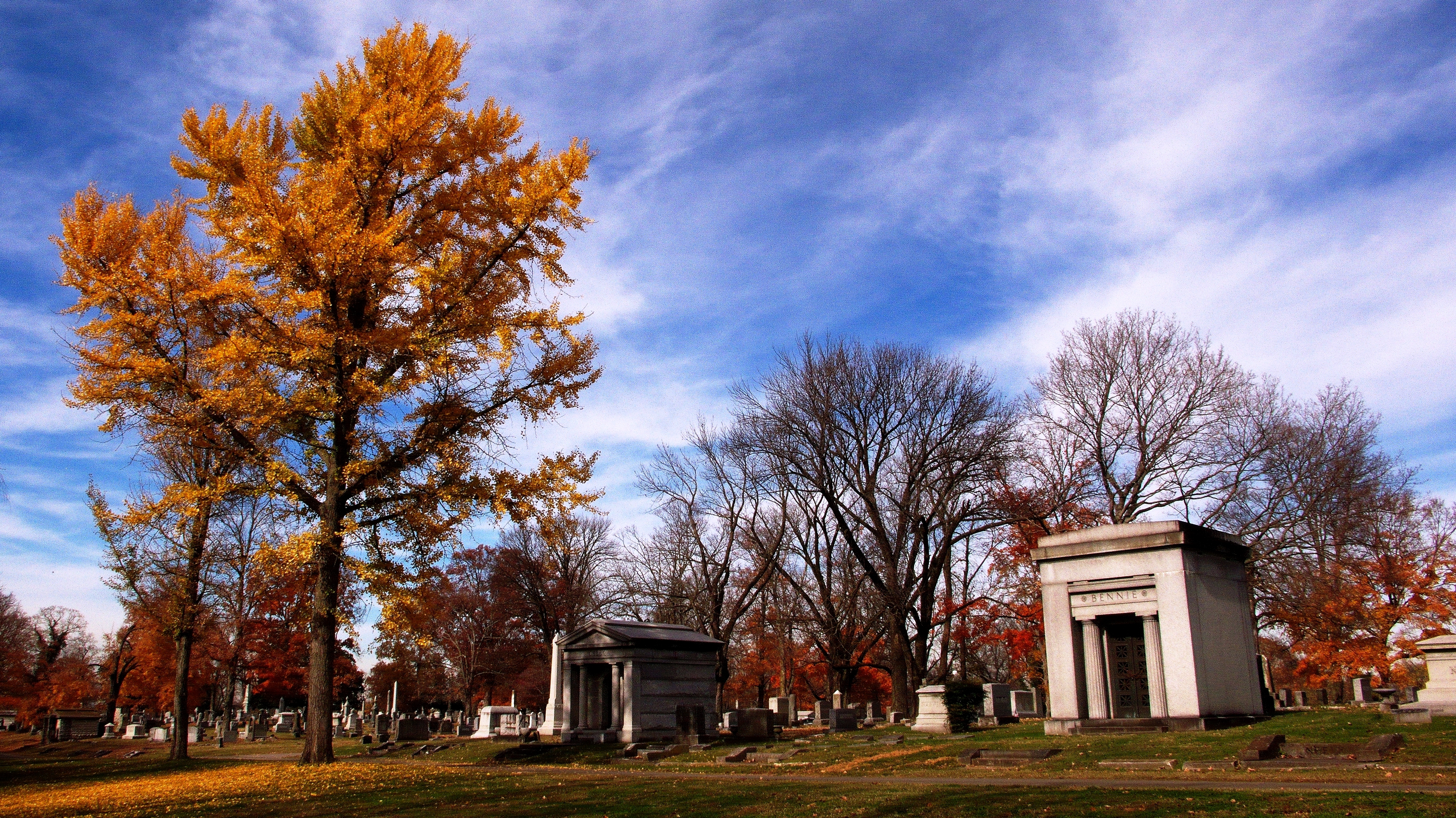

- Location within Tennessee Location within the United States
- Location: 1101 Lebanon Pike; Nashville, Tennessee
- Coordinates: 36°09′00″N 86°44′02″W
- NRHP reference No.: 05001334
- Added to NRHP: November 25, 2005

Mount Olivet Cemetery is a 206-acre (83 ha) cemetery located in Nashville, Tennessee, United States. It is located about two miles east of downtown Nashville, and adjacent to the Catholic Calvary Cemetery. It is open to the public during daylight hours.

== History ==
=== Antebellum era ===
The Mount Olivet Cemetery was established by Adrian Van Sinderen Lindsley and John Buddeke in 1856. It was modelled after the Mount Auburn Cemetery. In the 1870s, a chapel designed in the Gothic Revival architectural style by Hugh Cathcart Thompson was built as an office.

The Southern aristocracy was buried in a separate section from common folks. These included planters, as well as former governors of Tennessee, U.S. senators, and U.S. congressional representatives. In the antebellum era, slaves were often buried near their owners. Visitors to Nashville were buried alongside paupers.

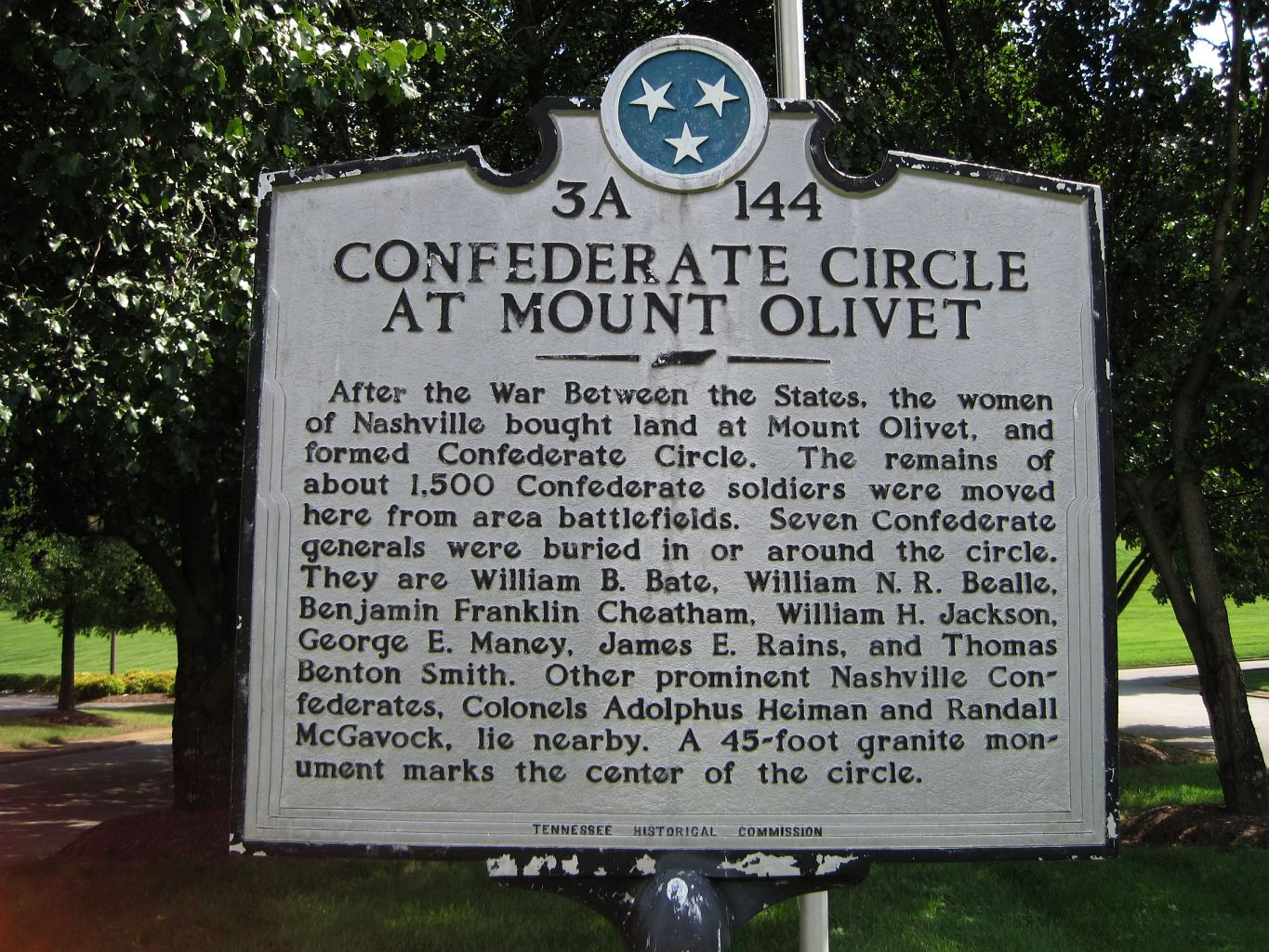
Sign of Confederate Circle.

=== Confederate circle ===
After the American Civil War, "the Ladies Memorial Society of Nashville with surviving Confederate veterans such as William B. Bate, Daniel Carter, General Benjamin Cheatham, and Thomas Harding purchased 26,588 square feet in the center of Mount Olivet and established Confederate Circle" for the interment of Confederate dead. It was used for the interment of Confederate soldiers who had died on nearby battlegrounds and as a memorial to their sacrifice. Women organized such memorial associations and raised money for interment of Confederate soldiers in major cities across the South and areas with concentrations of bodies. The memorial association arranged for burials of about 1,500 soldiers at Confederate Circle. The burial grounds were dedicated in 1869. They also built a stone obelisk in 1889, which is also accompanied by two Confederate flags.

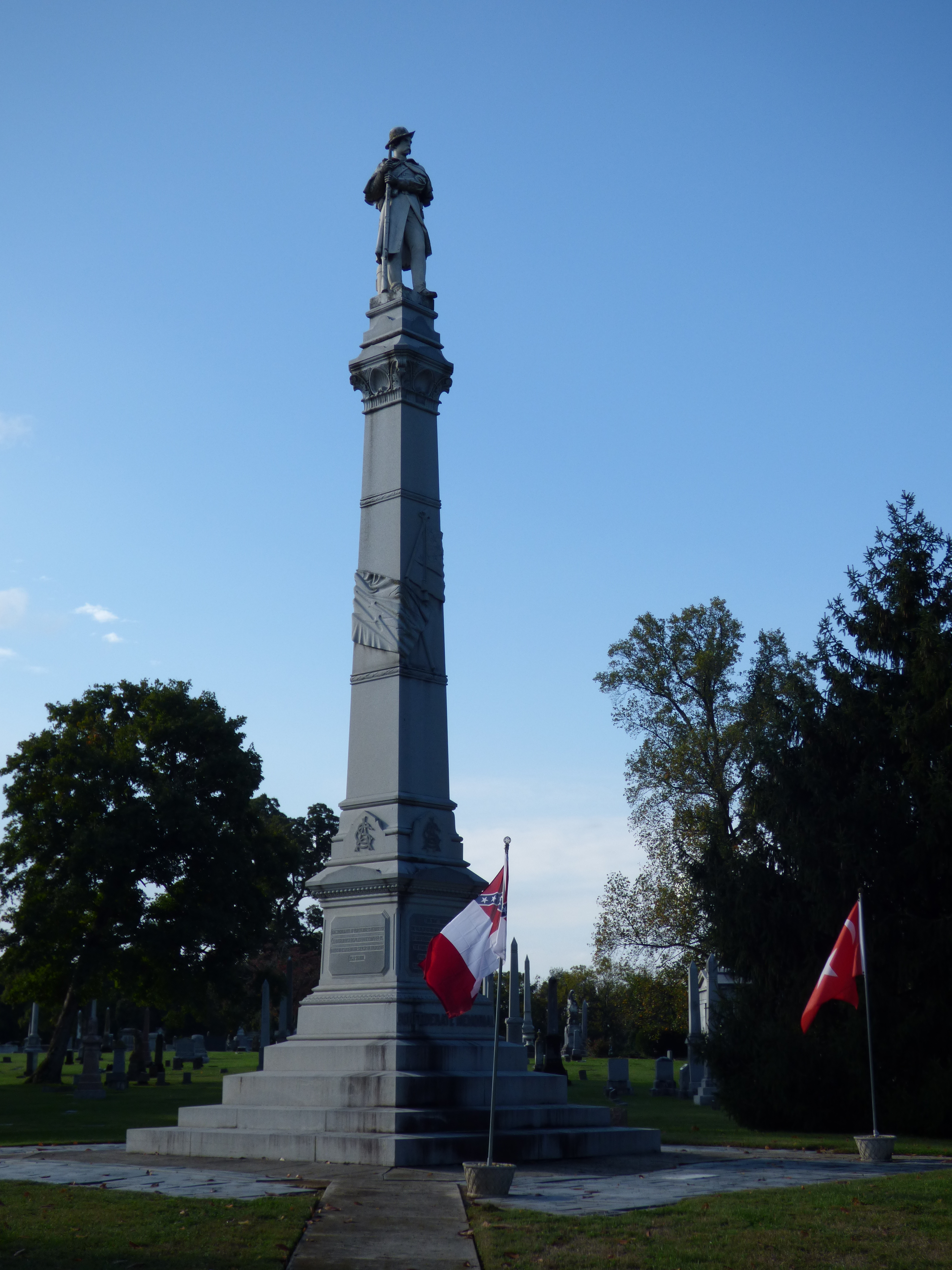
Stone obelisk marking Confederate graves at Mt. Olivet Cemetery, Confederate Circle, Nashville

=== World War I and beyond ===
A plaque in memory of Nashvillians who died in World War I was dedicated by General Hugh Mott in 1924. The cemetery was purchased by Stewart Enterprises in 1994. On January 25, 2015, the chapel, by then listed on the National Register of Historic Places, burned.

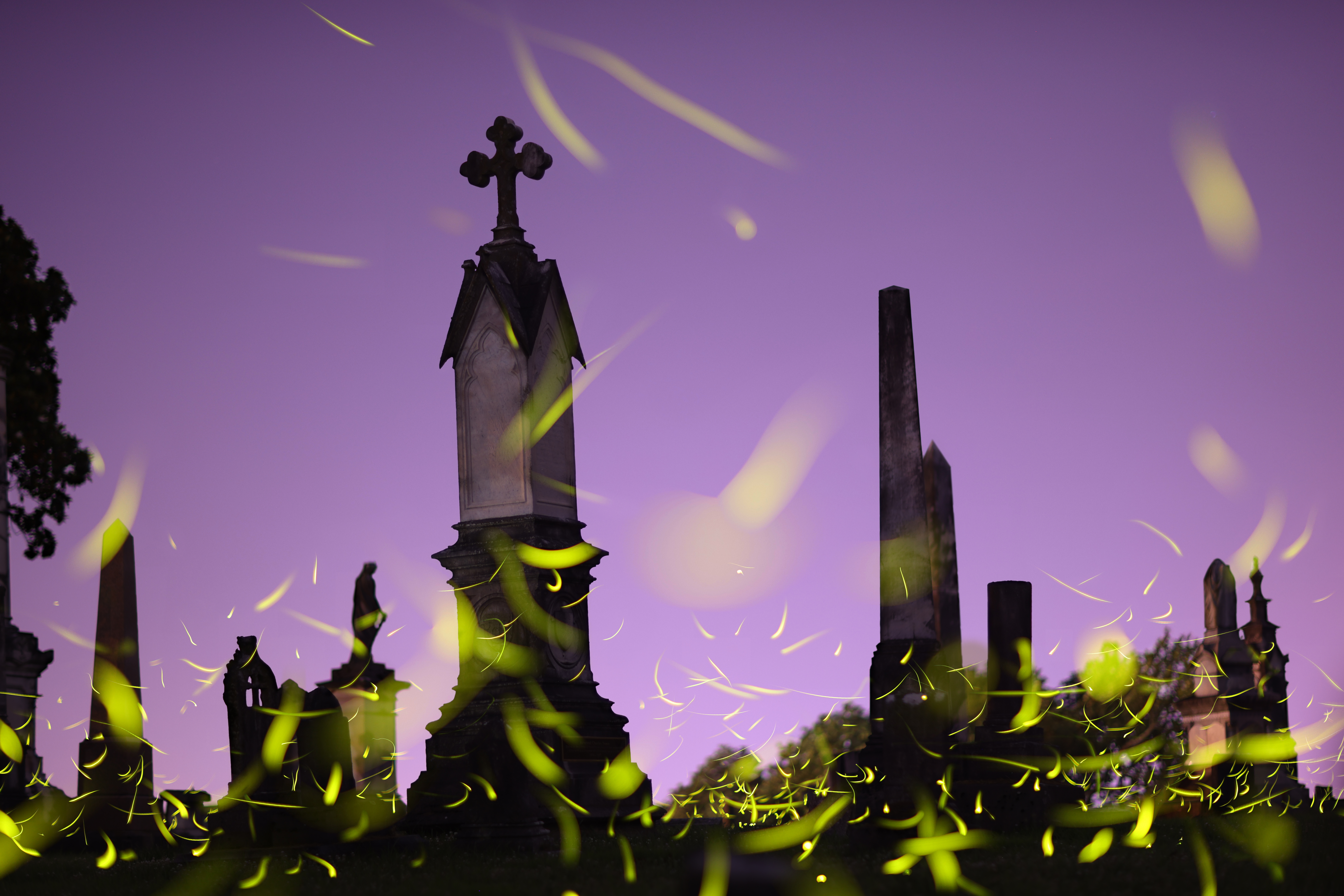
Fireflies at Mt. Olivet as seen on a late June night.

== Notable burials ==
- Adelicia Acklen, plantation and slave owner.
- Emma Louise Ashford, American organist, composer, and music editor
- Oswald Avery, acclaimed scientist whose experiments proved that DNA is the substance that carried genes.
- John Meredith Bass, Mayor of Nashville from 1833–34, and in 1869.
- William B. Bate, Governor of Tennessee (1883–87), American Civil War general.
- Fannie Battle, Confederate spy and social reformer
- John Bell, United States Senator and presidential candidate
- Aaron V. Brown, Governor of Tennessee (1845–47), United States Postmaster General from 1857–59
- James Stephens Brown, Mayor of Nashville from 1908–09
- Lytle Brown, major general in the U.S. Army
- George P. Buell, Union Army general
- Joseph Wellington Byrns, United States Congressman and Speaker of the House
- John Catron, U.S. Supreme Court Justice.
- Benjamin F. ("Frank") Cheatham, Confederate general during the American Civil War.
- Francis Gracey Childers (1860–1921), Army general and Tennessee State Representative
- Mark R. Cockrill (1788–1872), cattleman, planter, and "Wool King of the World".
- Clarence Kelley Colley (1869–1956), architect.
- Washington Bogart Cooper (1802–1888), painter.
- Elizabeth Litchfield Cunnyngham (1831–1911), missionary and church worker
- George A. Dickel (1818–1894), liquor dealer and wholesaler
- Anne Dallas Dudley (1876–1955), women's suffrage activist.
- Guilford Dudley, U.S. ambassador to Denmark under the Nixon and Ford presidential administrations.
- Winfield Dunn (1927-2024), 43rd governor of tennessee and businessman
- George Dury (1817–1894), portrait painter
- Edward H. East (1830–1904), Tennessee Secretary of State, briefly served as the state's "acting governor" in 1865
- Joseph Thorpe Elliston (1779–1856), silversmith, owner of the Burlington plantation, fourth mayor of Nashville, 1814–17
- Cornelia Keeble Ewing (1898–1973), American clubwoman
- Sarah Polk Fall (1847–1924) Nashville socialite and unofficially adopted daughter of former first Lady Sarah Polk
- Jesse Babcock Ferguson, onetime minister of the Nashville Church of Christ, later associated with Spiritualism and Universalism
- Thomas Frist, co-founder of Hospital Corporation of America and father of the former majority leader of the U.S. Senate, Bill Frist
- Francis Furman (1816–1899), Nashville businessman during the Reconstruction era. His tomb, designed by sculptor Johannes Gelert (1852–1923), is the largest one in Mount Olivet Cemetery.
- Sidney Clarence Garrison (1885–1945), second President of Peabody College (now part of Vanderbilt University), 1938–45
- Meredith Poindexter Gentry, United States Congressman
- Carl Giers, early photographer
- Alvan Cullem Gillem, Civil War Union general and post-bellum Indian fighter
- Caroline Meriwether Goodlett, co-founder of the United Daughters of the Confederacy
- Vern Gosdin 1934–2009 country music legend
- William Crane Gray, (1835–1919), First Episcopal Bishop of the Missionary Jurisdiction of Southern Florida
- Felix Grundy (1775–1840), U.S. Senator from Tennessee and 13th Attorney General of the United States.
- George Blackmore Guild (1834–1917), Mayor of Nashville 1891–95.
- Robert Kennon Hargrove (1829–1905), a bishop of the Methodist Episcopal Church, South
- Henry C. Hibbs (1882–1949), architect.
- E. Bronson Ingram, founder of Ingram Industries Inc., parent company of Ingram Barge Company; Ingram Book Company, the nation's largest book distributor; Ingram Micro; and other major companies
- Howell Edmunds Jackson, United States Senator and Supreme Court Justice
- William Hicks Jackson, Confederate general during the American Civil War
- Thomas A. Kercheval, Tennessee State Senator and Mayor of Nashville
- Eugene C. Lewis, engineer, chairman of the Nashville, Chattanooga and St. Louis, civic leader.
- David Lipscomb, founder of Nashville Bible School (now Lipscomb University).
- William Litterer (1834–1917), Mayor of Nashville, 1890–91.
- George Maney, Confederate Civil War general and U.S. Ambassador to Chile, Bolivia, Paraguay, and Uruguay
- Jack C. Massey, co-founder of Hospital Corporation of America and owner of Kentucky Fried Chicken.
- Hill McAlister, Governor of Tennessee from 1933–37
- Randal William McGavock (1826–1863), Mayor of Nashville, 1858–59 and Confederate Lt. Colonel who was killed in the Battle of Raymond.
- Eliza Jane McKissack (1828–1900), founding head of music in 1890 to the forerunner of the University of North Texas College of Music
- Benton McMillin, Governor of Tennessee (1899–1903)
- Kindred Jenkins Morris (1819–1884), Mayor of Nashville, 1869–71.
- Thomas Owen Morris (1845–1924), Mayor of Nashville, 1906–08.
- John W. Morton, Confederate veteran, founder of the Nashville chapter of the Ku Klux Klan, Tennessee Secretary of State, 1901–09.
- Charles Nelson (1835–1891), businessman and distiller
- William Nichol (1800–1878), Mayor of Nashville, 1835–37.
- John Overton, friend of Andrew Jackson and one of the founders of Memphis, Tennessee.
- Andrew Price (politician) (1854–1909), Louisiana Congressman
- Bruce Ryburn Payne (1874–1937), founding president of Peabody College (now part of Vanderbilt University), 1911–37.
- Colonel Buckner H. Payne (1799–1889), clergyman, publisher, merchant and racist pamphleteer.
- Fountain E. Pitts (1808–1874), Methodist minister, Confederate chaplain and colonel, first pastor of the West End United Methodist Church in Nashville.
- James E. Rains, American Civil War general killed in the 1862 Battle of Murfreesboro
- Oliver P. Rood, American Civil War soldier, Medal of Honor recipient
- Fred Rose, music publishing executive
- Thomas "Tom" Ryman (1841–1904) Nashville riverboat captain and founder of the Ryman Auditorium
- William Percy Sharpe (1871–1942), Mayor of Nashville, 1922–24
- John Hugh Smith (1819–1870), Mayor of Nashville three times during the 19th century
- Donald W. Southgate (1887–1953), architect
- Edward Bushrod Stahlman (1843–1930), German-born railroad executive, publisher of the Nashville Banner and builder of The Stahlman.
- Mildred T. Stahlman (1922-2024), American neonatalogist and academic
- Ernest Stoneman (1893-1968), country music performer
- Roni Stoneman (1939-2024), American Musician
- Wilbur Fisk Tillett (1854–1936), Methodist clergyman and educator; dean of Vanderbilt's theology school
- Anthony Wayne Van Leer (1783–1864), ironmaster
- George D. Waller (1883–1969), architect.
- David K. Wilson (1919–2007), businessman and philanthropist; major donor to Vanderbilt University and the Republican Party
- Del Wood (1920–1989), country musician, member of the Grand Ole Opry

== See also ==
- Greenwood Cemetery
- List of burial places of justices of the Supreme Court of the United States
