= Thomas brothers (mediums) =

Welsh spiritualists (born 1881)

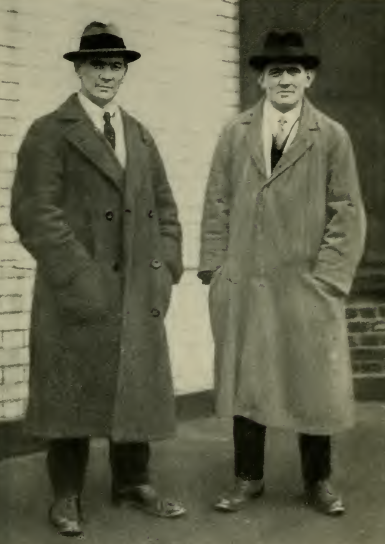
Thomas brothers

Tom and Will Thomas (born c. 1881) most well known as the Thomas brothers were two early twentieth century spiritualist mediums from Penylan, a village in the south of Wales.

The brothers claimed to communicate with a spirit guide called "White Eagle". They were tied up in their séances and when the lights were turned off, objects would move around the room.

Arthur Conan Doyle had attended a séance with the brothers in 1919, and declared the phenomena to be genuine. This was disputed by the magician Harry Houdini who found their mediumship act suspicious, noting there were methods of how they could have freed themselves from control. The mentalist Stuart Cumberland, whom the brothers refused to their séances, told Houdini "there wasn't a chance of the Thomas brothers being genuine".

== See also ==
- Davenport brothers
