= John H. Stevens =

American politician

John Harrington Stevens
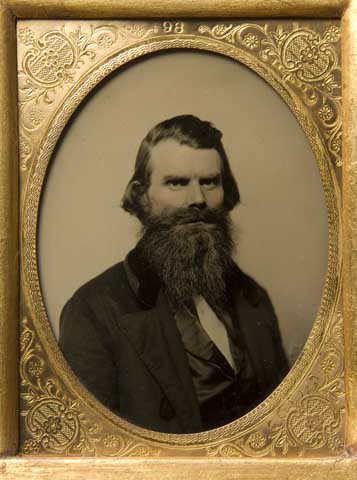
- Stevens c.1857-1858

Member of the Minnesota House of Representatives
- In office December 2, 1857 – December 6, 1859

Member of the Minnesota Senate
- In office December 7, 1859 – January 7, 1861

Personal details
- Born: June 13, 1820 Brompton, Quebec, Lower Canada
- Died: May 28, 1900 (aged 79) Minneapolis, Minnesota, U.S.
- Resting place: Lakewood Cemetery; Minneapolis, Minnesota, U.S.
- Other political affiliations: Prohibition Party

Military service
- Allegiance: United States
- Branch/service: United States Army; Union Army
- Years of service: 1846-1849; 1862-1863
- Rank: Captain; Brigadier General, USV
- Commands: Minnesota Militia
- Battles/wars: Mexican-American War; Dakota War of 1862

John Harrington Stevens (June 13, 1820 – May 28, 1900) was a soldier, farmer, politician, editor, historian, and prominent citizen of Minnesota. Stevens was the first authorized colonial resident on the west bank of the Mississippi River in what would become Minneapolis, Minnesota. Stevens was granted permission to occupy the site, then part of the Fort Snelling military reservation, in exchange for providing ferry service to St. Anthony across the river. Stevens, along with Franklin Steele, is considered one of the first residents of Minneapolis and one of the earliest settlers of both Hennepin County and Ramsey County.

== Early life ==
John Harrington Stevens was born on June 13, 1820 in Brompton Falls, Quebec(now Brompton, Quebec), then part of Lower Canada to parents Gardner Stevens and Deborah Harrington. Stevens family were originally from the state of Vermont and had fought in the American Revolutionary War before moving to Canada. Stevens was educated in common school in the Eastern United States and later attended public school in both Illinois and Wisconsin Territory. Shortly before his enlistment into the military, Stevens worked in the lead mining business in both Galena, Illinois and Mineral Point, Wisconsin.

Stevens enlisted into the United States Army during the Mexican–American War and served in Mexico from 1846 to 1849 as part of the United States Army Quartermaster Corps. Although Stevens was often referred to as "Colonel", Stevens did not have official rank of Colonel in the U.S. Army, he was actually only a Captain. Colonel was an unofficial title commonly used during the time. After his discharge from the military Stevens remained at his home in Galena, Illinois before moving to Minnesota Territory in 1849.

== Life in Minnesota ==
Stevens, 1880

Once in Minnesota Territory Stevens established a trading post with Franklin Steele named John H. Stevens and Company near Saint Anthony Falls on the east side of the Mississippi River near modern-day Minneapolis. Stevens eventually ventured further west near the Fort Snelling military installation and Indian Reservation where Stevens was granted a permit to settle on land near Fort Snelling, so long as he provided ferry service across the Mississippi River to soldiers. Soon after his land claim Stevens built his house and occupied it with his family. Stevens house was the first house on the west bank of the Mississippi River at St. Anthony and the second oldest remaining wood-frame house in Minneapolis. Minneapolis and St. Anthony merged in 1872, so there are others who can claim to be earlier Minneapolis residents. The oldest existing house from that earlier settlement was built by Ard Godfrey in 1848, two years before Stevens' home; that house is now at the small Chute Square park in the city. Stevens at the time also served as the postmaster of the post office located at Fort Snelling.

Stevens eventually moved westward and on May 21, 1855 settled land in the modern-day city of Glencoe, Minnesota where he continued his occupation of farming. Stevens was eventually elected to the Minnesota House of Representatives and served in the 1st Minnesota Legislature from 1857–1858, and later the Minnesota Senate in 1859–1861. From 1857 to 1859 Stevens represented the 18th Minnesota Legislative District which at the time included McLeod County, Renville County, and Sibley County. During his early political career in Minnesota Stevens was the founder and chairman of the Minnesota State Agricultural Society and the state's militia. Stevens was re-elected in 1861 to serve in the 4th Minnesota Legislature representing Glencoe in the Minnesota House of Representatives from District 6, representing Carver County, Kandiyohi County, McLeod County, Meeker County, Monongalia County, and Wright County. During the session he was the chair of Minnesota military affairs, the Agriculture and Manufactures committee, federal relations, and rules and joint rules committee.

At the outbreak of the Dakota War of 1862 immediately following the Attack at the Lower Sioux Agency and Battle of Fort Ridgely Stevens was appointed to the rank of Brigadier General of the Minnesota state militia and was in charge of the militias of McLeod, Carver, Sibley, and Renville counties with his headquarters at Glencoe. Besides his military service and role in state politics, Stevens was a heavy contributor towards newspaper editing. Among the newspapers edited by Stevens were the St. Anthony Express, Chronicle, The Glencoe Register, Tribune, the Cataract and Agriculturalist, the Farmer's Union, the Farmer's Tribune, and the Farmer's Stock and Home.

== Later life ==
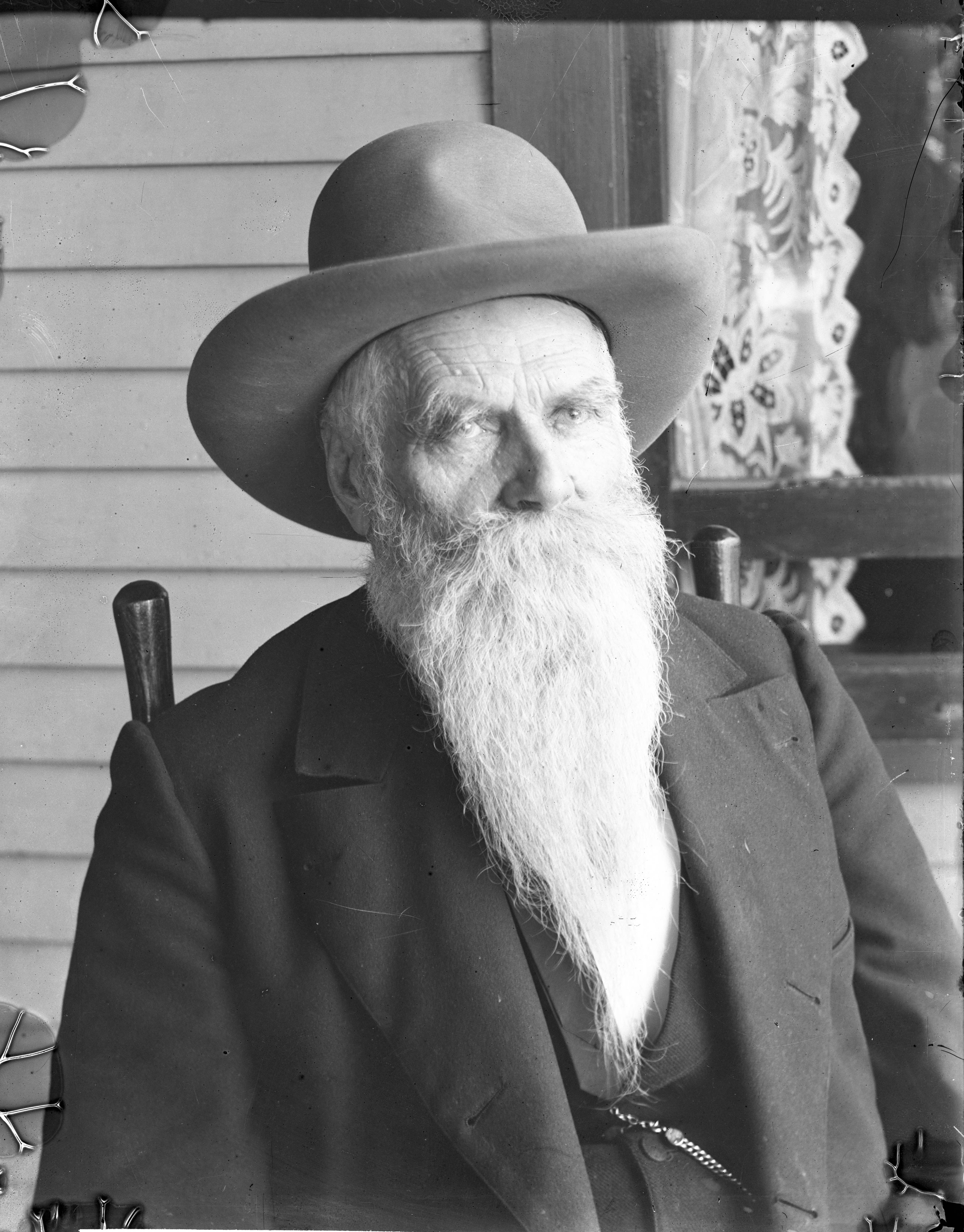
Stevens c.1890's

Following the American Civil War Stevens ran unsuccessfully as a Democrat-Anti-Monopoly candidate for the office of the Minnesota Secretary of State in the 1873 Minnesota Secretary of State election, he lost to the Republican incumbent Samuel P. Jennison who had a majority vote margin of 0.73%. Stevens ran again in 1875 unsuccessfully during the 1875 Minnesota Secretary of State election as a Prohibition Party candidate for the office of Minnesota Secretary of State only winning 1.89% of the vote. Stevens was later re-elected to the Minnesota House of Representatives in 1876 during the 18th Minnesota Legislature representing Hennepin County and was on the Federal Relations committee and the Insurance committee.

In his later years Stevens was heavily involved in writing books pertinent to the early history of Minnesota and its territorial government as he had lived in Minnesota since before its statehood. In total, Stevens wrote two major books on the history of Minneapolis, famous Minnesotans, and general Minnesota history (see selected works). Stevens also contributed several sections of the book History of the city of Minneapolis, Minnesota by Minnesota judge Isaac Atwater. Stevens died on May 28, 1900 in Minneapolis, he is buried in Lakewood Cemetery.

== Personal life ==
On May 1, 1850 Stevens was married to Frances Hellen Miller of Westmoreland, New York in Rockford, Illinois, together they had six children; five daughters and one son.

== Legacy ==
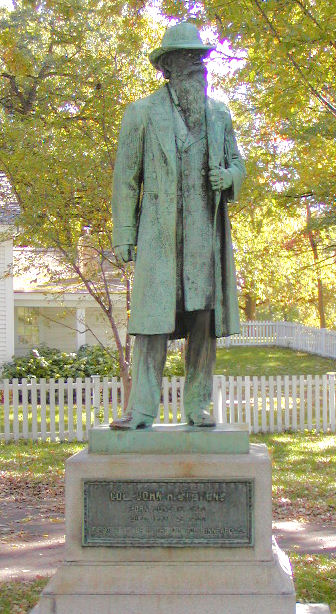
Statue of John H. Stevens by Johannes Gelert in Minnehaha Park

The Stevens House was moved several times, finally to Minnehaha Park in south Minneapolis in 1896. The house is now a museum, with tours available on summer weekends. The home was considered to be a civic and social hub of the city, and was used to organize both Hennepin County and the city of Minneapolis. The Stevens Square Neighborhood in the Central Minneapolis Community is named after Stevens. A statue of Stevens was made from 1911 to 1912 by Danish-American sculptor Johannes Gelert. The statue was originally dedicated on June 10, 1912 at Stevens Square (previously named Stevens Triangle) at the intersection of Portland Avenue and Grant Street in Minneapolis before being relocated on October 5, 1935 to Minnehaha Park in Minneapolis near his house.

== Selected works ==
- Personal Recollections of Minnesota and its People, and early History of Minneapolis (1890).
- Recollections of James M. Goodhue (1894).
- History of Minneapolis and Hennepin County Minnesota, Volume II (1895).
