= William Preston Anderson =

American attorney, land speculator (1774–1831)

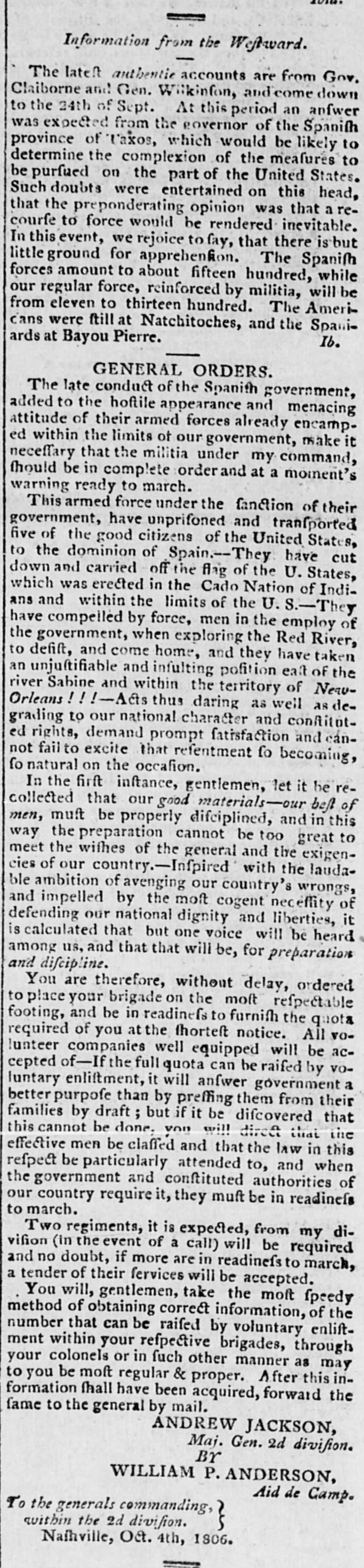
- "Information from the Westward" about the Burr conspiracy (Richmond Enquirer, November 11, 1806)
- Born: 1775; Botetourt County, Virginia
- Died: April 1831; Tennessee, United States

William Preston Anderson (1774–1831) was a United States Attorney, colonel during the War of 1812, surveyor, and land speculator in Tennessee and Alabama, United States. He is best known today for his association with U.S. president Andrew Jackson and as the father of a general of the Confederate States Army.

== Early life and career ==
Anderson was a native of Botetourt County, Virginia, born about 1775. His parents were likely Margaret Belle Patton and her second husband William Anderson.

According to a family history, "During the second term of General Washington's administration [1793–1797], he received from the President, a commission of Lieutenant in the U. S. Army." In 1797 he was licensed to practice law in Tennessee. He was admitted to the bar of Davidson County in 1798. Anderson was the third United States Attorney for the District of Tennessee, serving from 1798 to 1802. Once upon a time, "Anderson had supplied [Andrew] Jackson with such goodies as game cocks from Virginia and hot tips on land investments." According to John Spencer Bassett's notes in The Correspondence of Andrew Jackson, Clover Bottom "was leased in November 21, 1804, by William Preston Anderson, with the privilege of buying 300 acres on the south for $3,000. On March 5, 1805, he sold two-thirds of his rights in the enterprise to Andrew Jackson and John Hutchings, and Apr. 8, 1806, he sold the remaining third to John Coffee." Anderson and his brother Patton Anderson won $4,000 by betting on Jackson's horse Truxton against Joseph Erwin's horse Ploughboy. In January 1805 he was a signatory to a petition protesting the court-martial of Thomas Butler, probably produced at the behest of Andrew Jackson and sent to Thomas Jefferson's government, recorded in official state papers under the title "Disobedience of Orders Justified on the Grounds of Illegality." In August 1805 he was present at a dinner in Nashville honor of Aaron Burr, at which he toasted "May his promptness, impartiality, and eloquent valedictory address, serve as a polar star to his successor and may all honest Americans never forget such merit."

He was appointed Surveyor General of the district of Tennessee. Anderson was the district surveyor "who had been one of those instrumental in effecting" the Chickasaw treaty of 1805, and was part of an extended network of speculators, bankers, surveyors, and public officials that included John Brahan, James Jackson, John Coffee, John Drake, John Strother, Edward Ward, and Thomas Freeman. Some or all of these men also had connections to Andrew Jackson and were involved in the settlement by white slave owners of what became the Huntsville, Alabama metropolitan area. In 1806 Anderson may have lived or worked at a place called Federal Bottom, as there is notebook in the early land records of Tennessee recorded as "Anderson & Strother memorandum or Day Book made 1st May 1806. Federal Bottom," and on December 31, 1806, he sent a letter to Andrew Jackson from Federal Bottom that was to be opened only by Jackson or John Coffee. The letter to Jackson touched on a number of issues, among which was that he owned Jackson money and wondered if Jackson would accept "a negro...or a land warrant" or both, in lieu of cash. In 1807, Anderson, Robert Weakley, and Joseph Coleman advertised "the season" of their "noted imported racehorse" Royalist.

According to an account ledger published during the 1828 presidential campaign, one of the expenses that Aaron Burr had in account with Andrew Jackson in October 1806 was $700 for W. P. Anderson. Meriweather Lewis left two trunks full of possessions and documents with William P. Anderson (recorded in some accounts as William C. Anderson). After Lewis' death on the Natchez Trace in 1809, William Clark wrote his brother that he was going to check with Anderson about the papers. According to an inventory signed by Anderson, William R. Boote, John Brahan, and Thomas Freeman, most but not all of the items and papers in the trunks were sent to Washington, D.C. in November 1809, a handful of items were left with Anderson, the most substantial of which was "One Tomahawk—handsomely moun[te]d."

== War of 1812 ==
Anderson served under Jackson in the Tennessee militia before and during the War of 1812. In 1813 Anderson was named superintendent of the Nashville recruiting district. During the war he was colonel of the 24th United States Infantry, and engaged in the battle of Fort Harrison. On the Natchez Expedition of 1813, Methodist chaplain Learner Blackman made his acquaintance and reported that Anderson was "a very polite and agreeable man talked much with me about Religion." According to the editors of The Papers of Andrew Jackson, Anderson was "Jackson's aide de camp from 1803 to 1812, when he resigned to accept a commission as lieutenant colonel in the U.S. Army. The friendship ended sometime later, perhaps during Jackson's quarrel in 1817 with Anderson's father-in-law, John Adair."

The cause of their falling out is unknown, but it might have started with "the ridiculous hotel brawl" between Jackson, Jesse Benton, and Thomas Hart Benton. During the 1828 election cycle, Anderson presented letters from the duel surgeon, Dr. May, about potential misconduct by Jackson during the Dickinson duel. Thomas Waggaman, a resident in Washington, D.C. who apparently had worked closely with Charles Dickinson prior to his death, wrote to Felix Robertson on the eve of the 1828 election about the "Tennessee opposition" that "Col. Anderson's conduct appears to me at this distance equally strange and his motives must be very strong to justify a course characterized by so much violence." Frustrated at the harassment unleashed by Jackson's campaign, Anderson ultimately released a public letter addressed to Jackson, his former friend:

1st. Your besetting sins are, ambition, and the love of money. To acquire the latter you will act miserly and oppress your best friends; and when in pursuit of either, you are not what you profess to be.

2d. You are naturally and constitutionally irritable, overbearing and tyrannical.

3d. You are incapable of expending any charity toward those who happen to differ with you in opinion.

4th. You cannot investigate dispassionately any interesting or important subject, and if you could, your knowledge and abilities are not equal to the task.

5th. When you become the enemy of any man, you will put him down if you can, no matter by what means, fair or foul, honorable or dishonorable; if it be consistent with your views of popularity and interest, you will turn about and support the very man you have before attempted to destroy and pull down. These examples will suffice for the present; the Hon. Wm. H. Crawford, Gen. John Adair, and Col. Thos. H. Benton.

6th. You are miserably deficient in principle, and have seldom or never had power without abusing it.

— Col. William P. Anderson (1828)

This got Anderson called a man "whose mind is much disturbed and shattered" by Jackson partisans, and the effort was ultimately to no avail: Jackson went on to eight years in the White House, while Anderson returned to private life. Anderson died in April 1831.

== Patton Anderson ==
William P. Anderson had a brother named Patton Anderson, who apparently worked as a trader of land warrants, horses, and slaves. On October 24, 1810, Patton Anderson was shot and killed by David Magness in Shelbyville, Tennessee.

== Personal ==
Anderson was married twice, and fathered a total of 10 children. He married first, Nancy Bell of Davidson County, Tennessee, in 1800. She died in 1809. His second wife, Margaret Lapsley Adair, was a daughter of politician John L. Adair of Kentucky. One of Anderson's sons by his second marriage was J. Patton Anderson who served as a colonel of the Mississippi Rifles in the Mexican-American War and was a general of the Confederate States Army during the American Civil War.

Anderson was a member of a Masonic lodge in Tennessee that was founded by James Robertson around 1789. Other members of the Masonic lodge included John Childress, Andrew Jackson, Seth Lewis, Howell Tatum, Bennett Searcy, and Robert Searcy.

== See also ==
- Alabama real estate bubble of the 1810s
- Andrew Jackson and the slave trade

== Sources ==
- Anderson, J. Patton; Anderson, Etta (1896). "Autobiography of Gen. Patton Anderson, C.S.A. (Monticello, Florida, 1865) and Gen. Anderson's Different Commands During the War". Southern Historical Society Papers. XXIV. Richmond, Virginia: Virginia Historical Society: 57–72.
- Campbell, Jack MacGregor (2017). The Great Magness Trial: The Killing of Patton Anderson, The Trial of the Magness Family, & the Pursuit of Justice on the Tennessee Frontier. Dickson, Tennessee: Braybree Publishing. ISBN 978-1-940127-12-5. LCCN 2017278701. OCLC 1040034531.
- Dupre, Daniel S. (2018). Alabama's Frontiers and the rise of the Old South. History of the trans-Appalachian frontier. Bloomington, Indiana: Indiana University Press. ISBN 978-0-253-03152-5.
- Ely, James W. Jr.; Brown, Theodore Jr., eds. (1987). Legal Papers of Andrew Jackson. University of Tennessee Press. ISBN 978-0-87049-355-3.
- Jackson, Donald Dean, ed. (1962). Letters of the Lewis and Clark Expedition : with related documents, 1783–1854. Urbana, Illinois: University of Illinois Press – via Internet Archive.
- Johnson, Patricia Givens (April 1973). "William P. Anderson and 'The May Letters'" (PDF). Filson Club History Quarterly. 47 (2). Louisville, Kentucky: 171–178. ISSN 0015-1874. OCLC 6674913.
- Kelley, Sarah Foster (1987). West Nashville: Its People and Environs. Nashville, Tennessee: Douglas Printing, Inc. ISBN 978-0-9615960-0-2. LCCN 87174035. OCLC 17229742.
- Roberts, Frances Cabaniss (2020) [1956]. Reidy, Thomas (ed.). The Founding of Alabama: Background and Formative Period in the Great Bend and Madison County. Tuscaloosa: University of Alabama Press. ISBN 9780817320430. LCCN 2019018459. OCLC 1133266247. Project MUSE book 72323.
- Rose, Richard; Davies, Phillip L. (2017). Dear Brother: Letters of William Clark to Jonathan Clark. Yale University Press. doi:10.12987/9780300149081. ISBN 978-0-300-14908-1.
- Thomas, Jane Henry (1897). Old Days in Nashville, Tennessee. Nashville, Tennessee: Publishing house Methodist Episcopal church, South, Barbee & Smith, agents. hdl:loc.gdc/scd0001.00146133502. LCCN 08018615. OCLC 4159540. OL 140000W.
- Vance, Mildred Ethel (1908). Tennessee Politics in the Jackson Era (M.A. thesis). University of Wisconsin. OCLC 608865724.
- Various; Jackson, Andrew (1926). Bassett, John Spencer (ed.). Correspondence of Andrew Jackson, Volume I, to April 30, 1814. Carnegie Institution of Washington Papers of the Historical Research Department No. 371. Baltimore, Maryland: The Lord Baltimore Press. LCCN 26007292. OCLC 2533564 – via HathiTrust. This article incorporates text from this source, which is in the public domain.
- Various; Jackson, Andrew (1928). Bassett, John Spencer (ed.). Correspondence of Andrew Jackson, Volume III, 1820–1828. Carnegie Institution of Washington Papers of the Historical Research Department No. 371, Vol. III. Baltimore, Maryland: The Lord Baltimore Press – via Internet Archive.
- Various; Jackson, Andrew (1984). Moser, Harold D.; McPherson, Sharon (eds.). The Papers of Andrew Jackson, Volume II, 1804–1813. Knoxville, Tennessee: University of Tennessee Press. doi:10.7290/utp3038. ISBN 978-0-87049-441-3. LCCN 79015078. OCLC 5029597.
- Webb, Gary Alan (Spring 1984). "The Magness Trials" (PDF). Williamson County Historical Journal. 15. Franklin, Tennessee: 21–34. LCCN 86642787. OCLC 14186085.
