= John Cockrill =

American settler

- Born: December 19, 1757; Wythe County, Virginia, U.S.
- Died: April 11, 1837 (aged 79); Nashville, Tennessee, U.S.
- Occupation: Settler
- Spouse: Anne Robertson Johnson Cockrill
- Children: 8, including Mark R. Cockrill
- Parent(s): John Cockrill; Barbara Fox
- Relatives: James Robertson (brother-in-law); Felix Robertson (nephew); Benjamin F. Cockrill Jr. (nephew); James Collinsworth(nephew)

Major John Cockrill (December 19, 1757 - April 11, 1837) was an American settler. A veteran of the American Revolutionary War, he was one of 13 explorers to modern-day Nashville, Tennessee in 1779, and he received a land grant in modern-day Centennial Park in 1784 Cockrill Springs named for him.

== Early life ==
Cockrill was born on December 19, 1757, in Wythe County, Virginia. His father, John Cockrill, was a Welsh-born immigrant of Scottish descent who served in the French and Indian War of 1754-1763 and became a large planter in Richmond County, Virginia.

== Career ==
Cockrill served in the American Revolutionary War of 1775–1783, first under Colonel William Russell and later under Brigadier Lachlan McIntosh. In 1779, he was one of 13 explorers who went down the Cumberland River to modern-day Nashville alongside James Robertson.

Cockrill was granted land in modern-day Nashville in 1784.

== Personal life and death ==
Cockrill married Anne Robertson Johnson Cockrill, the sister of James Robertson. They had eight children, including Mark R. Cockrill. Cockrill built the first brick house in Nashville, on Cedar Street (now Charlotte Avenue). Half Brother was Edward Collinsworth whose son was James Collinsworth a Veteran of San Jacinto

Cockrill died on April 11, 1837, in Nashville.
