= Cockrill =

Cockrill is a surname. Notable people with the surname include:

- Benjamin F. Cockrill Jr. (1866–1936), American farmer and politician
- Mark R. Cockrill (1788–1872), American cattleman, horse breeder and planter
- Maurice Cockrill (1936–2013), British painter and poet
- Sterling R. Cockrill (born 1925), American politician
- Sterling R. Cockrill (judge) (1847–1901), chief justice of the Arkansas Supreme Court
