= 1817 Tennessee gubernatorial election =

- August 7–8, 1817
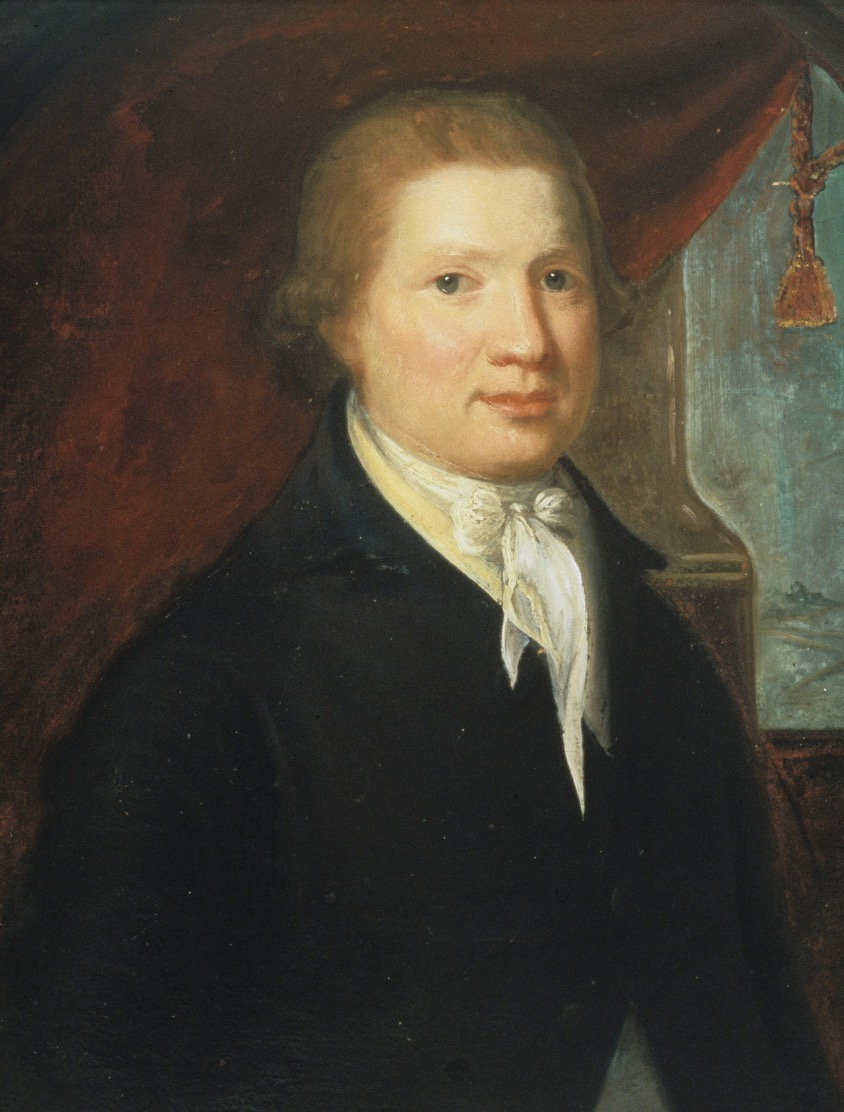

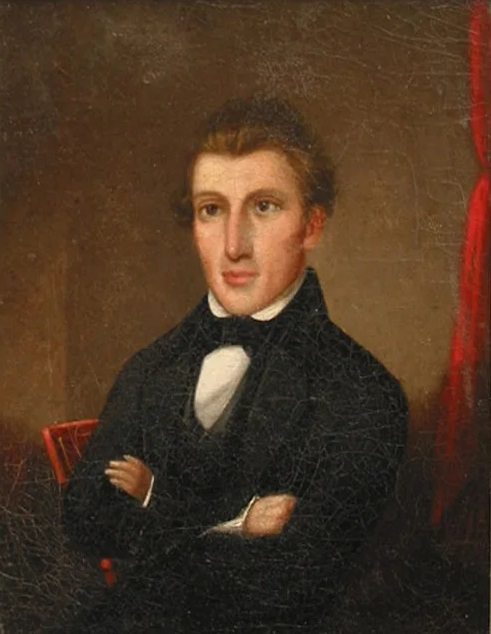
Nominee	Joseph McMinn	Robert Coleman Foster
Party	Democratic-Republican
Popular vote	27,901	15,461
Percentage	64.34%	35.66%
- County results McMinn: 50–60% 60–70% 70–80% 80–90% 90–100% Coleman: 50–60% 60–70% 70–80% 80–90% No Data/Vote
Governor before election
Joseph McMinn
Democratic-Republican
Elected Governor
Joseph McMinn
Democratic-Republican

The 1817 Tennessee gubernatorial election was held between August 7 and 8, 1817 in order to elect the Governor of Tennessee. Democratic-Republican nominee and incumbent Governor Joseph McMinn won re-election against former Speaker of the Tennessee Senate and 1815 Gubernatorial candidate Robert Coleman Foster.

== General election ==
On election day, August 7, 1817, Democratic-Republican candidate Joseph McMinn won re-election by a margin of 12,440 votes against his opponent Robert Coleman Foster, thereby retaining Democratic-Republican control over the office of Governor. McMinn was sworn in for his second term on September 27, 1817.

=== Results ===
Tennessee gubernatorial election, 1817
Party	Candidate	Votes	%
Democratic-Republican	Joseph McMinn (incumbent)	27,901	64.34
	Robert Coleman Foster	15,461	35.66
Total votes		43,362	100.00
Democratic-Republican hold			
