= Felix G. McGavock =

American politician

Felix G. McGavock (died 1897) was a politician in Arkansas. He lived in Mississippi County, Arkansas and represented it in the Arkansas House of Representatives in 1883. He was a nephew of Felix Grundy of Tennessee.
