= John Cockrill (politician) =

Welsh-born American planter and politician

- Born: c. 1740; Wales
- Occupations: Planter, politician
- Children: John Cockrill
- Relatives: Anne Robertson Johnson Cockrill (daughter-in-law); Mark R. Cockrill (grandson); Benjamin F. Cockrill Jr. (great-great-grandson)

John Cockrill (c. 1740 - ?) was a Welsh-born American planter and politician. He served as a member of the House of Burgesses.

== Early life ==
Cockrill was born circa 1740. He was of Scottish descent. He emigrated to the United States with Major General Edward Braddock.

== Career ==
Cockrill served in the French and Indian War of 1754–1763. He subsequently became a large planter in Richmond County, Virginia and/or Wythe County, Virginia.

Cockrill served as a member of the House of Burgesses.

== Personal life and legacy ==
Cockrill was married twice. He had a son, Simon, from his first marriage. His second wife was Barbara Fox; their son, also called John Cockrill, was a settler in modern-day Nashville, Tennessee.
