= John Brahan =

American speculator and slave owner (1774–1834)

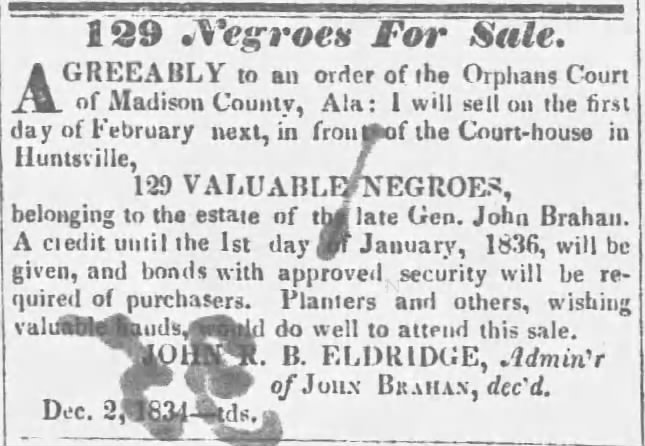
- "129 Negroes for Sale" The Democrat, December 3, 1834
- Born: June 8, 1774; Virginia, United States
- Died: July 5, 1834 (aged 60); Alabama, United States

John Brahan (June 8, 1774 – July 5, 1834) was a resident of the frontier-era southern United States. He was a land speculator, public official, and militia officer in Tennessee and Alabama. In 1819 he resigned from his job as receiver of public monies at the public land office in Huntsville, Alabama because the federal bank account was short $80,000.

== Biography ==
Brahan was originally from Fauquier County, Virginia. He was married to Mary Weakley, daughter of Tennessee politician and landowner Robert Weakley. Brahan was paymaster of the Tennessee militia in 1804 at Fort Southwest Point. He and William Dickson were appointed to work at the Nashville Land Office on April 10, 1809. Brahan was in the Natchez District of Mississippi Territory when his appointment came through. A military staff list published at Natchez in May 1809 listed Brahan as a captain.

Both Brahan and Dickson were land speculators. Brahan's job was "receiver of public monies" and Dickson's job was registrar. Both men had a connection to William P. Anderson who was the district surveyor "who had been one of those instrumental in effecting" the Chickasaw treaty of 1805, and to an extended network of speculators and surveyors that included James Jackson, John Coffee, John Drake, John Strother, Edward Ward, and Thomas Freeman. Many of this group were long-time allies of Tennessee planter and speculator Andrew Jackson, and connected to one another by a dense web of business and family ties.

These men were all early buyers of lands in the vicinity of the Big Spring, shortly thereafter organized as the town Twickenham, Madison County, Mississippi Territory. The settlement quickly discarded "Twickenham," reverting to the name which had been used by the squatters who already lived there, and by which it is now known: Huntsville, Alabama. Per approved petition to the U.S. Congress made by Brahan, the Nashville Land Office became the Huntsville Land Office on August 7, 1811. In 1811, Brahan was also serving as the receiving officer for the Cherokee Indian Agency at Huntsville, and wrote to Return J. Meigs, "It is rumored that the Creeks are preparing for war against us, if true they must be a blind people, and will no doubt prove their own destruction."

Brahan and Leroy Pope both served as "principal contractors for Jackson's army during the Creek War." In March 1814, "from Fort Strother, Jackson subcontracted with the Huntsville firm of Pope and Brahan," ordering rations for 3,000 for 40 days. However, Madison County merchants "had difficulty fulfilling their promises. Jackson had to plead directly to the wealthiest planters in Madison County to secure cornmeal for his starving soldiers."

Leroy Pope was at the center of a crew of Virginians and Georgians including Thomas Bibb, William Bibb, Charles Tait, and his son-in-law John Williams Walker, who eventually became so politically powerful in Madison County and Alabama generally that they were called the "Royal Party." This group were also connected to William H. Crawford, soon to be Secretary of the Treasury, and a once and future enemy of Jackson. In January 1818, Brahan, John Read, three Popes (including LeRoy), Thomas Bibb, and others were named directors of Planters' and Merchants' Bank of Huntsville. In November Brahan advertised that he had two cotton gins running in Spring Grove near Huntsville.

According to the records of a shipping company based at the Boatyard on the Tennessee River, "Braham & Hutchins. Received 161 barrels of salt at Ditto's Landing in October, 1816, and 314 barrels in April, 1817." In 1818, a commission merchant in Natchez listed Braham & Hutchings of Huntsville as a reference in an advertisement; Braham was a common misspelling of Brahan, and Hutchings was most likely Andrew Jackson's nephew John Hutchings, although he had already died the prior autumn. The same year chronicler Anne Royall visited Huntsville and wrote in a letter, "General Brahan, of the late war, is a prince, in whatever light he may be viewed. He is polite and affable; of great size; handsome person; of middle age, and a man of great wealth."

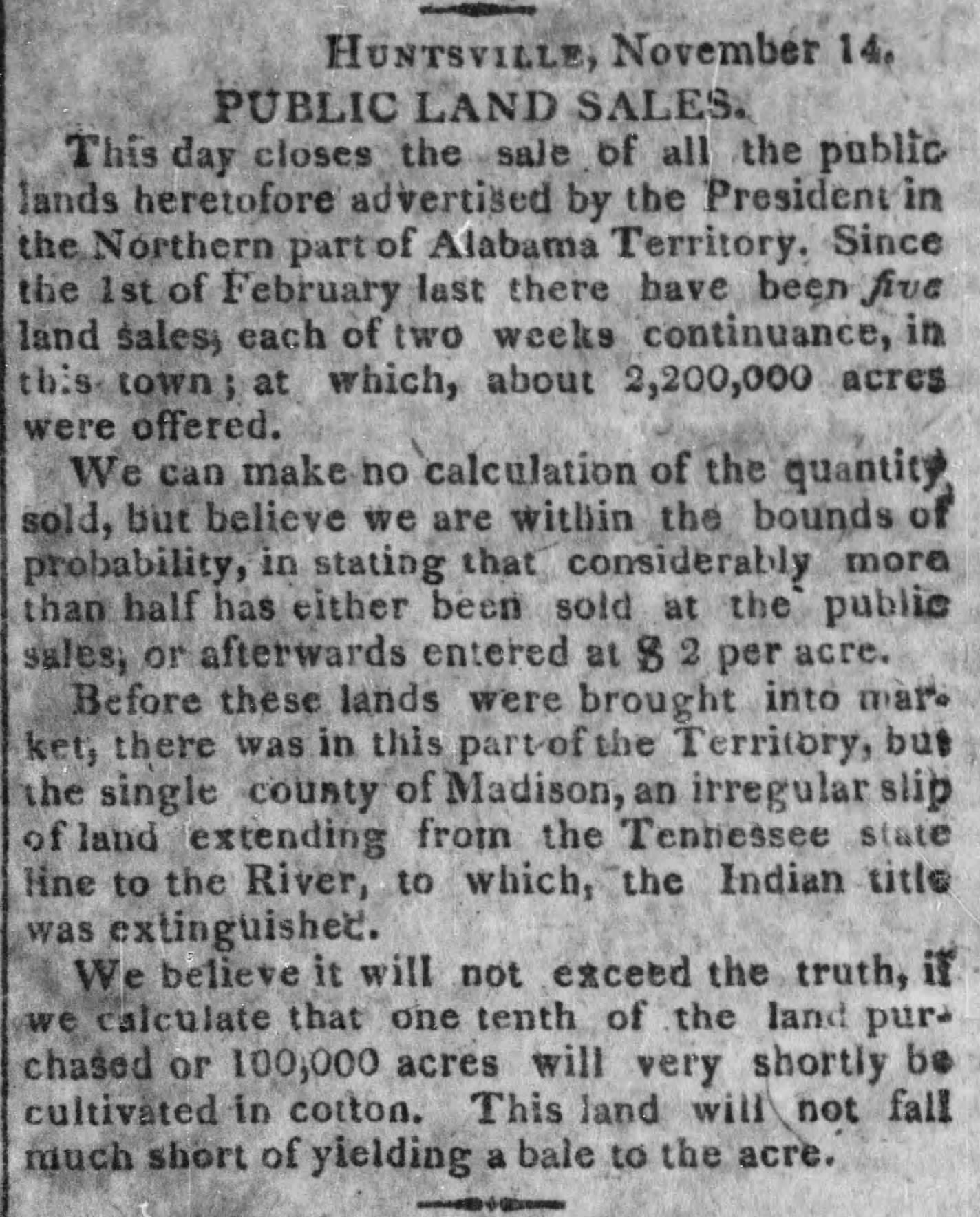
"Huntsville, November 14 – PUBLIC LAND SALES" (Mississippi Free Trader, Natchez, November 27, 1818)

The Panic of 1819 hit Tennessee and Alabama Territory hard, and the usual cascade of financial failure following times of rampant speculation began. As hints of irregularities began to emerge, officials in Washington inquired with Brahan, but it was 17 months from start to finish before they received any kind of useful disclosure. In March 1819, Josiah Meigs wrote him "I am directed by the Secretary of the Treasury to inform you that he is extremely dissatisfied on account of your neglecting to settle your accounts, that no longer delay is admissible—and that if an immediate settlement is not made it will be necessary to adopt such measures as will better secure the rights & interests of the Government." In June 1819 Brahan wrote Meigs "I have the mortification to inform you that there is a considerable deficiency in my cash account, the cause I can only account for in part" and resigned from the job. According to Treasury Secretary William H. Crawford the account was short US$80,000 (equivalent to $1,682,609 in 2025) and he suspected most of it was in Brahan's hands. Historian Chase C. Mooney quotes a letter from Crawford about the Brahan–Huntsville debacle as the Secretary's de facto "code of ethics for the public official" of the United States:

It is extremely desirable that the conduct of the officers of the government, especially those who have charge of the public money, should not only be correct, but there should be no possible cause of suspecting them to be incorrect. If there should exist any peculiarity in the situation of an officer which is calculated to excite suspicion, it is more imperiously to his interest and duty to exert more than ordinary diligence in the discharge of his official duties.

— William H. Crawford, 1819

As it happened, explained historian Ruth Ketring Nuermberger: "Brahan himself ended up with 44,677 acres and an indebtedness of $318,579. The down payment of $78,901 he blandly made from federal funds. Under pressure from the secretary of the treasury for a settlement of his accounts, Brahan assigned all his property to the United States. Valued at just over $46,000, it included 1,260 acres of land, several town lots in Huntsville, and $31,425 in notes due Brahan." One of the receivers in charge of holding the accounts on behalf of the U.S. government was Leroy Pope. George Mason wrote Clement Comer Clay, "Brahan will be considerably injured if not ruined; and the fur will be jerked off old Pope and some of his ill-gotten gains will go into the pockets of others. These men with several others of the same class have now got large debts running on them at ten per cent a month! ! !" In May 1819 John Brahan had been on deck to buy Andrew Jackson's Evans Spring plantation but the deal never came to pass.

There was a Congressional investigation into Brahan's default, which can be found in House Doc., No. 130 (serial 69), 17th Cong., 1st sess. and No. 149 (serial 102), 18th Cong., 1st sess. Brahan, Coffee, and John Read testified had been trying to buy up as much land as they could to keep the Georgia combination from doing it first, all in the interests of protecting the people. On July 8, 1815, Brahan formed a partnership "for the purpose of carrying on the mercantile business in Nashville, Tennessee" with Will Atwood. Brahan and Atwood moved to Huntsville in the fall of 1817, operating until March 1819 "when we sold out the remainder of our goods."

In October 1819 Judge John Overton wrote Jackson, who was heading out on a trip to Alabama, that Brahan owed him $792.50 and "The money wd suit me best, but will take one or two likely healthy boys of 12 or 13 years of age at such price as you may think they are worth in Cash, and as you would trade for yourself." The documents calendar in the Papers of Andrew Jackson records for November 1819 a "bill of sale for the slave Eli from John Brahan to John Overton. DS by AJ as witness, THi (7-0724)." Overton and Brahan jointly owned a tract of land in Tennessee that was sold by court order in 1823. In 1822, in one of her last letters from Huntsville, Royall mentioned Brahan again, writing:

I have often mentioned the great wealth of this place. Here are Colonel Leroy Pope, General Brayhan, Doctor Fern, Doctor Chambers, Doctor Manning, Thomas Bibb, Esq. and a score or two besides, that are rich as princes, and are stigmatized, by a few of the vicious, by the appellation of nobility. If by this designation, they mean the performance of noble actions, which is really the origin of the word, they could not better apply the term. But I am inclined to think, in the present instance, it is used by way of contempt. But let envy alone. Only because these people, by their own foresight and industry, laid out their money in the right time, and at the right place, instead of spending it in taverns and gambling houses, they have drawn down upon them the envy of little minds, who never did a generous act in their lives.

In 1824 Brahan advertised to Huntsville that he would gin and bale cotton for "a twelfth part." In 1827 the Pensacola Gazette and West Florida Advertiser credited Brahan with introducing to the state a grape variety known as the Bland Madeira, "which makes an excellent wine."

In June 1828, Congress passed a "private act" appropriating $6,964.99 to repay Brahan for expenses of "clerk hire" while he was receiver of public monies in Alabama. During the 1828 U.S. presidential election, there was a dispute over who had legally owned an enslaved man named John Amp, whom Jackson had reportedly armed to serve as an enforcer contra Choctaw agent Silas Dismore—was Amp the property of Jackson, former mayor of Nashville Joseph Coleman, or Brahan? Anti-Jackson campaign organizer Andrew Erwin, quoting from a letter written by Brahan's father-in-law Robert Weakley stating (among other things) that John Amp was "raised by me" and then was transferred to his daughter's husband Brahan, wrote a public letter addressing Jackson's work as a slave trader and commented on the circumstances of John Amp in 1811–12, "It seems from this letter, that the purchase from Epperson was not the only negro speculation in which your firm was concerned. You bought of John Brahan, and probably, if all the transactions could be brought to light, of several other persons."

In August 1828, the trustees of the Cottonport Land Company, John Coffee, James Jackson, James Bright, and John Brahan, scheduled a company meeting for October in Nashville. In 1829 the circuit court of Madison County, Alabama ruled on a business dispute involving the purchase of "sundry negroes," the buyer of which paid for in part with a note from John Brahan from 1819 for $6,662.

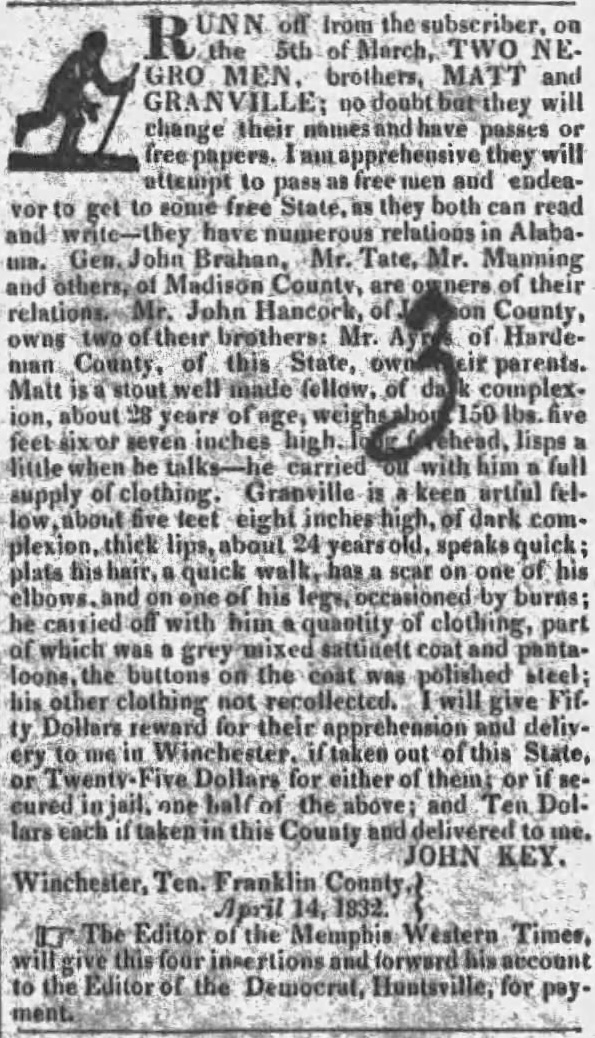
A unique runaway slave ad where the slave owner seemingly knows a great deal about the family of his missing slaves, Matt and Granville (John Brahan owned some of their relatives) suggesting that kinship networks may have played a role in the slave trade between Tennessee and Alabama (The Democrat, Huntsville, May 3, 1832)

Brahan was chair of a committee to organize an Episcopal Church in Huntsville in 1830 and was named a vestryman. In 1832, Brahan's daughter, Jane Brahan, married Robert M. Patton, later governor of Alabama. The couple were married for over 50 years. The same year Brahan chaired an Anti-Union and Anti-Nullification Meeting at which William Smith and C. C. Clay made speeches. Brahan's slaves started construction and brick making on Sweetwater Mansion in about 1834 but he did not live to see it completed and it ultimately came into possession of Robert and Jane Patton.

Brahan died in Florence, Alabama in 1834. His executors planned to auction off 129 people he had legally enslaved on February 1, 1835, in front of the Madison County courthouse. "Dick, an old servant" of Braham was listed for sale later that year, auction to be held July 1. In December 1835 the estate executor published notice that unless people who bought from Braham's estate paid their debts within three weeks of due date, lawsuits would be initiated and further interest would accumulate. Brahan's widow died in 1837.

== See also ==
- Spoils system
- Alabama real estate bubble of the 1810s

== Sources ==
- Abram, Susan M. (2015). Forging a Cherokee-American alliance in the Creek War: from creation to betrayal. Tuscaloosa: The University Alabama Press. ISBN 978-0-8173-1875-8.
- Ahern, L. R.; Hunt, R. F. (September 1955). "The Boatyard Store, 1814–1825". Tennessee Historical Quarterly. 14 (3). Tennessee Historical Society: 257–277. ISSN 0040-3261. JSTOR 42621241.
- Browning, Andrew H. (2019). The panic of 1819: the first great depression. Columbia: University of Missouri Press. ISBN 978-0-8262-7425-0.
- Carter, Clarence Edwin, ed. (1952). The Territorial Papers of the United States. Vol. 18 (Alabama Territory, 1817–1819). U.S. Govt. Print. Off., for sale by Supt. of Docs. NARA Pub. No. 52-11 – via HathiTrust.
- Dupre, Daniel S. (1997). Transforming the Cotton Frontier: Madison County, Alabama, 1800–1840. Baton Rouge: Louisiana State University Press. ISBN 978-0-8071-2193-1. LCCN 97016094.
- Dupre, Daniel S. (2018). Alabama's Frontiers and the rise of the Old South. History of the trans-Appalachian frontier. Bloomington, Indiana: Indiana University Press. ISBN 978-0-253-03152-5.
- Jackson, Andrew (1994). Moser, Harold D.; Hoth, David R.; Hoemann, George H. (eds.). The papers of Andrew Jackson. Vol. IV, 1816–1820. Knoxville: University of Tennessee Press. ISBN 978-0-87049-219-8.
- Kanon, Tom (2014). Tennesseans at War, 1812–1815: Andrew Jackson, the Creek War, and the Battle of New Orleans. Tuscaloosa: The University of Alabama Press. ISBN 978-0-8173-1829-1. LCCN 2013049815. OCLC 900093586. Project MUSE book 30812.
- Mooney, Chase C. (2014) [1974]. William H. Crawford: 1772–1834. Lexington: University Press of Kentucky. ISBN 9780813163833.
- Nuermberger, Ruth Ketring (2014) [1958]. The Clays of Alabama: A Planter-Lawyer-Politician Family. Lexington: University Press of Kentucky.
- Roberts, Frances Cabaniss (2020) [1956]. Reidy, Thomas (ed.). The Founding of Alabama: Background and Formative Period in the Great Bend and Madison County. Tuscaloosa: University of Alabama Press. ISBN 9780817320430. LCCN 2019018459. OCLC 1133266247. Project MUSE book 72323.
- Royall, Anne Newport (1969). Griffith, Lucille (ed.). Letters from Alabama, 1817–1822. University of Alabama Press. ISBN 0817352198. LCCN 70076584.
