= 1815 Tennessee gubernatorial election =

- August 3–4, 1815
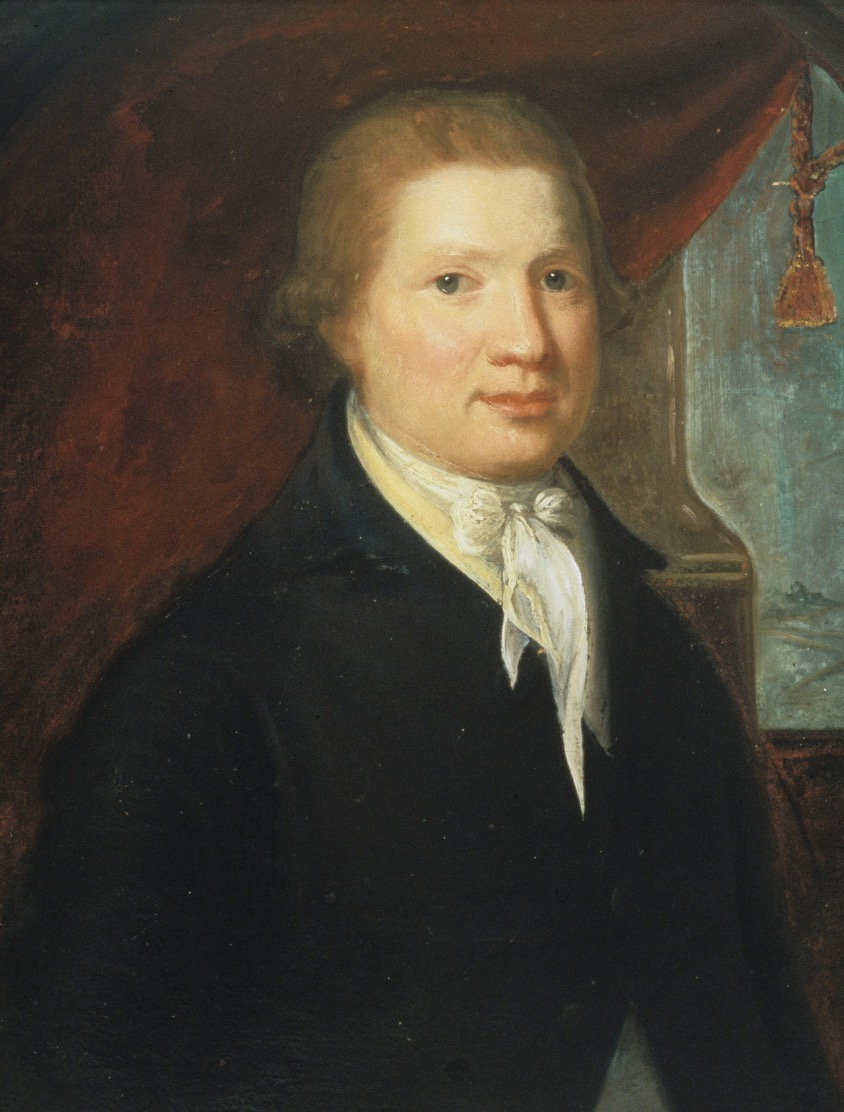

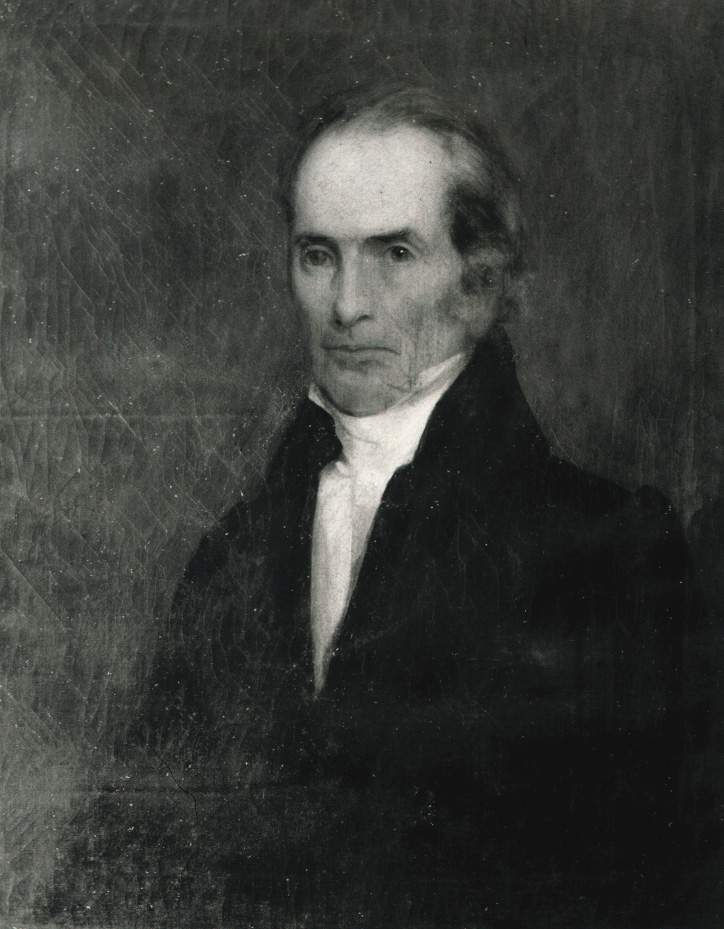

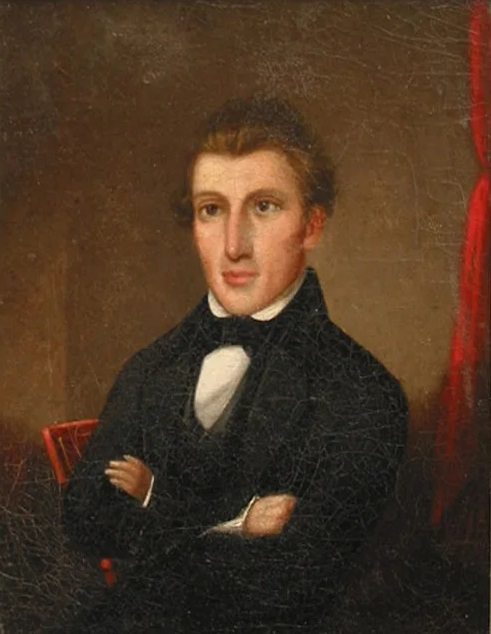

Nominee	Joseph McMinn	Robert Weakley	Jesse Wharton
Party	Democratic-Republican	Democratic-Republican	Democratic-Republican
Popular vote	16,354	7,642	7,060
Percentage	42.60%	19.91%	18.39%
Nominee	Robert Coleman Foster	Thomas Johnson
Popular vote	4,225	3,106
Percentage	11.01%	8.09%
- County results McMinn: 30–40% 40–50% 50–60% 70–80% 80–90% 90–100% Weakley: 30–40% 40–50% 50–60% 60–70% 70–80% Wharton: 30–40% 40–50% 50–60% Foster: 30–40% No Data/Vote
Governor before election
Willie Blount
Democratic-Republican
Elected Governor
Joseph McMinn
Democratic-Republican

The 1815 Tennessee gubernatorial election was held between August 3 and 4, 1815 in order to elect the Governor of Tennessee. Democratic-Republican candidate and former Speaker of the Tennessee Senate Joseph McMinn defeated fellow Democratic-Republican candidate and former member of the U.S. House of Representatives from Tennessee's 2nd district Robert Weakley, incumbent Democratic-Republican United States Senator from Tennessee Jesse Wharton, incumbent Speaker of the Tennessee Senate Robert Coleman Foster and Thomas Johnson.

== General election ==
On election day, August 3, 1815, Democratic-Republican candidate Joseph McMinn won the election by a margin of 8,712 votes against his foremost opponent and fellow Democratic-Republican candidate Robert Weakley, thereby retaining Democratic-Republican control over the office of Governor. McMinn was sworn in as the 4th Governor of Tennessee on September 27, 1815.

=== Results ===
Tennessee gubernatorial election, 1815
Party	Candidate	Votes	%
Democratic-Republican	Joseph McMinn	16,354	42.60
Democratic-Republican	Robert Weakley	7,642	19.91
Democratic-Republican	Jesse Wharton	7,060	18.39
	Robert Coleman Foster	4,225	11.01
	Thomas Johnson	3,106	8.09
Total votes		38,387	100.00
Democratic-Republican hold			
