= Pennsylvania Medical Society =

American professional society for medical doctors

- Formation: 1848
- Founder: Samuel Humes, MD
- Type: Professional Association
- Headquarters: Harrisburg, Pennsylvania
- Location: United States
- Official language: English
- President: Arvind Cavale, MD
- Board Chair: Lorriane Rosamilia, MD
- Key people: Martin Raniowski
- Website: https://www.pamedsoc.org/

The Pennsylvania Medical Society is a democratic organization governed by its physician members, founded in 1848. It represents physicians in public venues including the government, insurance companies, and the media; provides members with timely information, expert services, and professional support on medical practice issues; advances public health, public policy, medical science, education, and ethics; and advocates for patients.

== History ==
Originally named the Medical Society of the State of Pennsylvania when it was first founded in 1848, it became the 16th state medical society in the United States. Others included New Jersey, 1766; Massachusetts, 1780; South Carolina, 1789; Delaware, 1789; Connecticut, 1792; Maryland, 1798; Georgia, 1804; New York, 1807; Rhode Island, 1812; Vermont, 1813; Michigan, 1819; Virginia, 1821; Tennessee, 1830; Wisconsin, 1841; and Alabama, 1846. It was not until 1847 that these organizations formed the American Medical Association.

Prior to the founding of The Medical Society of the State of Pennsylvania, the Keystone State had few county or district medical societies. Those in existence were the College of Physicians, 1787; Philadelphia County Medical Society, 1796; Warren County Medical Society, 1821; Medical Faculty of Berks County, 1824; Franklin County Medical Society, 1825; Chester County Medical Society, 1828; Susquehanna County Medical Society, 1838; Mercer County Medical Society, 1843; Lancaster City and County Medical Society, 1844; Schuylkill County Medical Society, 1845; Northern Medical Association of Philadelphia, 1847; Lebanon County Medical Society, 1847; Mifflin County Medical Society, 1847; and the Medical Faculty of Montgomery County, 1847.

The Pennsylvania Medical Society was organized on April 11, 1848, at the Methodist Episcopal Church in Lancaster. Today, at this location is an historical marker that reads:

Founded April 11, 1848, at the First Methodist Episcopal Church on this site. Its purpose was to foster the advancement of medical knowledge, relieve suffering, and promote the health of the community. Samuel Humes, M.D. of Lancaster was the first president.

The marker was dedicated on October 16, 1998. It is located at North Duke & Walnut Streets, Lancaster.

== See also ==
- American Medical Association
- Pennsylvania Society of Oncology and Hematology
