= Ephraim H. Foster =

American politician (1794–1854)

Ephraim Hubbard Foster
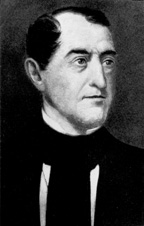

United States Senator from Tennessee
- In office September 17, 1838 – March 3, 1839; October 17, 1843 – March 3, 1845
- Preceded by: Felix Grundy; Alfred O. P. Nicholson
- Succeeded by: Felix Grundy; Hopkins L. Turney

Member of the Tennessee House of Representatives
- In office 1829-1831; 1835-1837

Personal details
- Born: September 17, 1794 Bardstown, Kentucky, U.S.
- Died: September 6, 1854 (aged 59) Nashville, Tennessee, U.S.
- Party: Whig
- Spouse: Jane M. Foster
- Relatives: Mark R. Cockrill (son-in-law); Benjamin F. Cockrill Jr. (grandson)
- Profession: Politician, Lawyer

Ephraim Hubbard Foster (September 17, 1794 – September 6, 1854) was an American politician, who twice served as a United States Senator from Tennessee. During his political career, he was a member of the Whig Party.

== Biography ==
Foster was born near Bardstown, Kentucky, in Nelson County, the son of Robert Coleman Foster and the former Ann Hubbard. In 1797 he moved with his parents to Tennessee, where they settled in the Nashville area. He later graduated from Cumberland College (1813) and later studied law, being admitted to the bar in 1820. He owned slaves. He also served in the Creek War and was for a time private secretary to General Andrew Jackson.

He was a member of the Tennessee House of Representatives from 1829 to 1831 and again from 1835 to 1837, serving each time as Speaker. Upon the resignation from the U.S. Senate of Felix Grundy to accept appointment as United States Attorney General, the Tennessee General Assembly elected Foster his successor. He served in the Senate for the first time from September 17, 1838, to March 3, 1839. The legislature elected him to continue in the new term, but he declined, refusing to take their instruction in how to vote while a Senator; the legislature then turned to Grundy, still Attorney General, to succeed him, which (controversially) Grundy agreed to do.

However, Grundy died in office about a year later. Alfred O. P. Nicholson agreed to serve on an interim basis; then for a period the seat was vacated entirely, but eventually the legislature agreed to elect Foster again to the seat and he agreed to serve. His second period of service in the Senate was from October 17, 1843, to March 3, 1845. During this time he chaired the Senate Committee on Claims. Later in 1845 Foster received the nomination of the Whig party for Governor of Tennessee, but was defeated in the election by Aaron V. Brown of the Democratic Party. Following this, Foster returned to his Nashville law practice until shortly before his death. He is buried in the old City Cemetery in Nashville.

His only daughter Sallie married Benjamin F. Cockrill, the son of planter Mark R. Cockrill, and they had a son, Benjamin F. Cockrill Jr.

== Sources ==
- United States Congress. "Ephraim H. Foster (id: F000302)". Biographical Directory of the United States Congress.

Party political offices
Preceded by James C. Jones	Whig nominee for Governor of Tennessee; 1845	Succeeded by Neill S. Brown
U.S. Senate
Preceded by Felix Grundy	U.S. senator (Class 1) from Tennessee; September 17, 1838 – March 3, 1839; Served alongside: Hugh L. White	Succeeded by Felix Grundy
Preceded by Alfred O. P. Nicholson	U.S. senator (Class 1) from Tennessee; October 17, 1843 – March 3, 1845; Served alongside: Spencer Jarnagin	Succeeded by Hopkins L. Turney
