= Alabama real estate bubble of the 1810s =

The Alabama real estate bubble of the 1810s was a real estate bubble centered on Huntsville, caused by increasing cotton prices resulting from demand from English textile manufacturers, relatively high cotton yields in Alabama, as well as general speculation. In 1817, property in Madison County sold for around $2 per acre, while in 1818 it sold for $7.40 per acre on average, with some tracts reportedly sold "at prices ranging from $20 to $78 per acre," at a time when land on the American frontier was sold for $2 per acre. By 1819, acreage prices plummeted to around $0.20 per acre due to the Panic of 1819 and increasing global supply of cotton.

== Background ==
Following the collapse of the Continental System and the final defeat of Napoleon in 1815, demand for English textiles increased in Continental Europe. As a result, English cotton imports surged 78% from 1815 to 1818, giving cotton speculators confidence that English industrialization, combined with a peaceful Europe, had created a permanent boost in cotton demand. With this sharp uptick in demand, cotton prices climbed from $0.20 per pound in 1815 to $0.30 per pound in most markets by 1817 and 1818.

The increase in cotton prices caused a rush to increase production, and attention soon focused on Alabama. Alabama was particularly conducive to growing cotton; at this time the exhausted soil in South Carolina was able to produce around 300 pounds of cotton per acre per year, while the most productive areas of Alabama Black Belt could yield between 800 and 1000 pounds. Furthermore, the area around Huntsville, Alabama, although not in the Black Belt, had easy access to the Tennessee River, which reduced transportation costs to New Orleans, where cotton could be sold and exported.

Finally, in order to encourage settlement of the western United States, the Land Act of 1804 permitted the federal government to auction land with standard 25% down payments and 6% interest, "and speculators mingled with homesteaders in the rush to buy." Purchasers could easily obtain credit from the Second Bank of the United States, notorious for its loose lending practices in its South and West branches, while other regional banks followed suit.

== Results ==
The above factors contributed to a speculative boom throughout the Territory, but particularly in Madison County, Alabama, where the prices increased from around $2 per acre in 1817 to $7.40 per acre by 1818, with reports of much higher prices ($78 per acre in one case) in certain locales. Cotton at this time cost around $0.15 per pound to produce, and when combined with prevailing prices at $0.30 per pound, implied annual profits of around $120 per acre. Such profits would justify even the highest per acre prices reported around Huntsville. Exuberant buyers may be more rational than many assume.

== Bust and aftermath ==
Following its creation in 1817, the Second Bank of the United States failed to control paper money issued from its branch banks in the West and South, contributing to a speculative land boom. Efforts to tighten its monetary policy and call in loans contributed to the Panic of 1819 and caused property and commodity prices to fall. In addition, national and global cotton production proved elastic and quickly increased. As a result, prices for first quality cotton in New Orleans fell from a high of $0.32 per pound in January 1818 to $0.25 per pound in January 1819 and $0.16 per pound in January 1820, where it would stay for decades. Given the $0.15 per pound production cost, this would reduce per acre profits by over 90%. As a result, farmland values collapsed: by 1819, prices fell to around $0.20 per acre, and by 1820, Alabama land buyers collectively owed the federal government $21 million, $12 million of which was owed by Alabama itself. Over the longer term, the 1828 Tariff of Abominations and other protectionist measures, while supporting northern manufacturers, permanently depressed land prices in the South, and by 1850, per acre prices were still only around $0.29 in Madison County.

== See also ==
- Alabama Fever
- John Brahan – American speculator and slave owner (1774–1834)
- William Preston Anderson – American attorney, land speculator (1774–1831)
- Edward Ward (businessman) – 19th-century Tennessee politician
