= Joseph Coleman (Tennessee politician) =

Tennessee politician (d. 1819)

Joseph Coleman (d. 1819) was an early settler of Tennessee, United States. He became the first mayor of Nashville, and also served as a trustee of the college that later became the University of Nashville.

NOTICE: Jockey Club Races - John Gordon, Joseph Coleman, Isham A. Parker, Robert Searcy (The Tennessee Gazette, March 11, 1800)

== Biography ==
Coleman was probably originally from Virginia but came to Tennessee at an early day. According to the 1889 reminiscences of Col. Willoughby Williams, "The next road leading from Nashville was called the Upper Franklin, now known as the Franklin turnpike. It passes out Spruce street by the customhouse. The first prominent man on the road was Joseph Coleman, who was an officer in the United States Army." Coleman "built the first fine house, which still stands behind the undertaking establishment of Groomes & Co., on Cherry Street, owned afterwards by Josiah Nichol. He also built the house on College Hill formerly owned by Maj. Rutledge, now the residence of Edward Baxter. Mr. Coleman also built the house of Mr. Joseph W. Horton, where he lived and died."

Coleman was reportedly on a committee of five formed at Nashville in 1799 "to arrange for the building of a stone court-house, to take the place of the log one. What a quaint picture it would present to us now, it we could see the log cabin as it then stood in the centre of the square, with hitching posts around, to which were tied the horses of those who were attending court. Here, too, on a Saturday, were various sales made at the courthouse door. Negroes were sold and real estate and cattle. From what I can glean I think a regular cattle show occurred here weekly." He was in business with Robert Searcy until 1802, when a newspaper item announced the dissolution of their partnership. There were about 400 people in Nashville in 1804, and the village was incorporated in 1806 with a mayor and six aldermen. The electorate at that time was solely property owners. Coleman served as mayor 1806 to 1809. One of his acts as mayor was offering a $100 reward for information regarding an incendiary (arsonist) who had allegedly tried to burn down the town.

He built three different houses in Nashville over the course of his residency in the town. According to Col. Williams these were, "He built the first fine house, which still stands behind the undertaking establishment of Grooms & Co. on Cherry street, owned afterwards by Josiah Nichol. He also built the house on College Hill, formerly owned by Maj. Rutledge, now the residence of Edward Baxter. Mr. Coleman also built the house of Mr. Joseph W. Horton, where he lived and died." He was also involved in horse racing and horse breeding. According to a history of thoroughbreds in Tennessee, "Joseph Coleman and associates brought Royalist, bred by the Prince of Wales, to Nashville in 1807. Royalist was the paternal grandsire of the famous American foundation mare, Lady Grey. She was Vandal's fourth dam and Kentucky's immortal Lexington's third dam. Royalist died in Williamson County in 1814. Royalist is the earliest known Tennessee name in current pedigrees."

In January 1805 he was a signatory to a petition protesting the court-martial of Thomas Butler, probably produced at the behest of Andrew Jackson and sent to Thomas Jefferson's government, recorded in official state papers under the title "Disobedience of Orders Justified on the Grounds of Illegality." From 1810 to 1812 he was partners with future U.S. president Andrew Jackson and a third man, Horace Green, in a business that traded in cotton, tobacco, and slaves. During the fiercely contested 1828 U.S. presidential election a man named John Lucas wrote a letter sharing his knowledge of the Jackson–Coleman–Green partnership:

While a boy in Virginia, I was well acquainted with Mr Coleman. Mr Apperson was my next-door neighbor, and a gentleman with whom I was well and intimately acquainted. I recollect perfectly his taking out to Nashville about sixty negroes. The precise date I do not remember, but think it was about 1808 to 10. Be this, however, as it may, I know that Mr Apperson made but one trip with negroes to that country. Upon his return I met with him, and, in a conversation respecting his success, be informed me that he had found considerable difficulty in selling his negroes for cash, and had disposed of them on a credit to our old countryman, Mr. Joseph Coleman. I remarked to Mr Apperson, that fame represented Mr Coleman to be in embarrassed circumstances. He observed that such was the current rumor of the day in and about Nashville, but that he was in no danger from that source, for he had declined making sale of the property to Mr. Coleman, but on condition that he would give drafts on an eastern city (perhaps Philadelphia) and notes negotiable and payable in one of the banks in Nashville, in the event of a failure in the drafts, and have both of those instruments endorsed by General Jackson as security. I am very positive that Mr Apperson said to me that Gen. Jackson was the security...

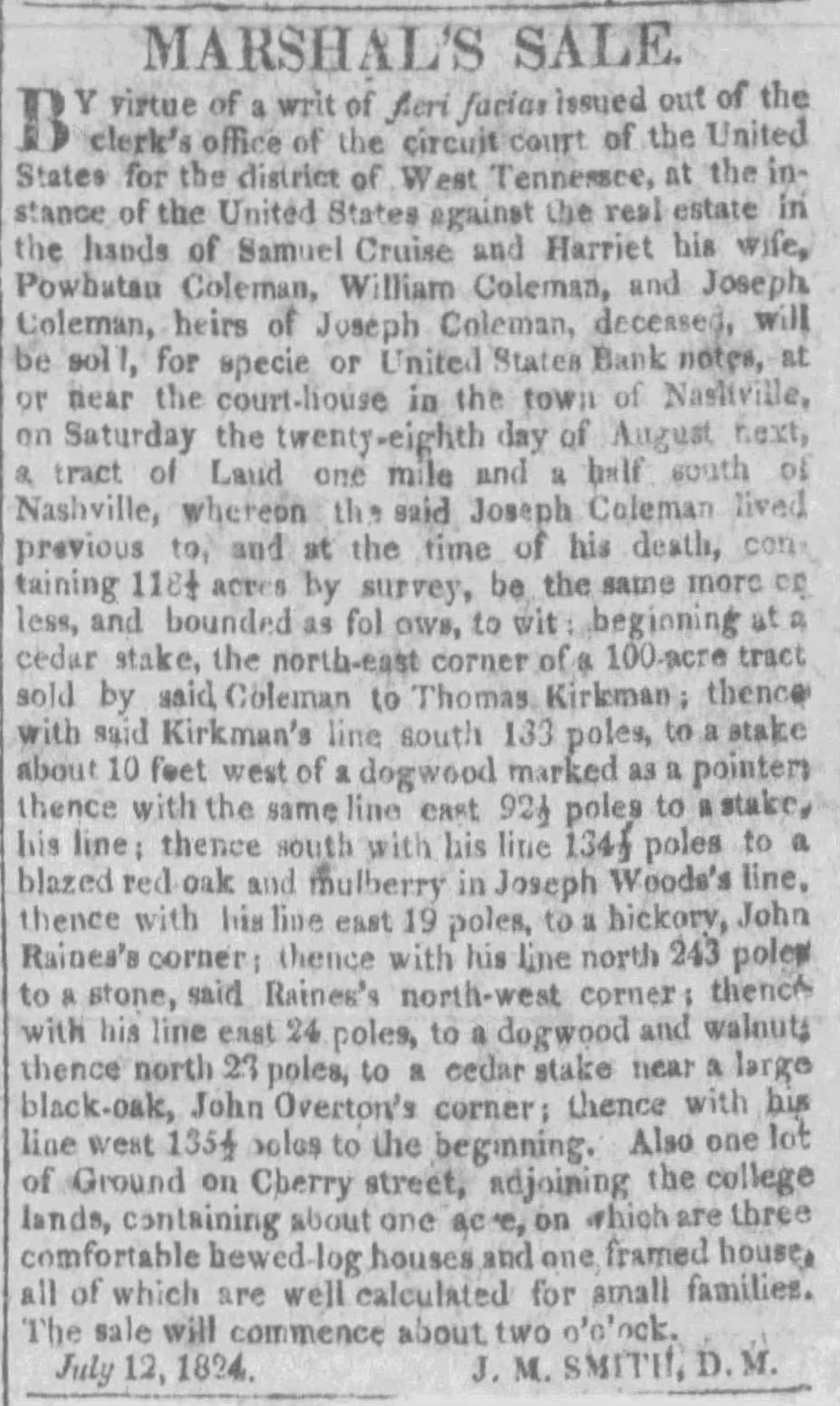
Joseph Coleman's property apparently abutted that of John Overton ("Marshal's Sale" National Banner and Nashville Whig, July 12, 1824)

Another man named John Smith wrote that Jackson was also the security on a cotton investment made by Coleman, but he had never heard that they were partners and he thought that Jackson had never met the slaves in question until he had to go fetch them from Natchez, at which time he was afraid "an attachment would be laid in Philadelphia, on the cotton and tobacco" and because he had a lien on the cargo. Andrew Erwin countered that he had seen bank records stating that "A. Jackson's proportion of cash for negroes bought of Richard Epperson" was US$929.45 (equivalent to $19,133 in 2025).

There was a related dispute about who legally owned an enslaved man named John Amp, whom Jackson had armed to serve as an enforcer contra Choctaw agent Silas Dismore—Robert Weakley claimed to have "raised" John Amp, but was he the property of Jackson, Coleman, or Jackson ally and Weakley's son-in-law John Brahan, later a leading figure in the early history of Huntsville, Alabama?

Of his personal life, memoirist Jane Thomas wrote, "Dr. Coleman built a house in South Nashville. It was a one-story house, with five or six rooms in a row, and a latticed porch in front. He had some very pretty daughters. He sold the place and moved to Huntsville, Ala."

Coleman died February 19, 1819, while visiting Huntsville in the Alabama Territory.

== See also ==
- List of mayors of Nashville, Tennessee
- Andrew Jackson and the slave trade

== Sources ==
- Thomas, Jane Henry (1897). Old Days in Nashville, Tennessee. Nashville, Tennessee: Publishing house Methodist Episcopal church, South, Barbee & Smith, agents. hdl:loc.gdc/scd0001.00146133502. LCCN 08018615. OCLC 4159540. OL 140000W.
