= Alfred O. P. Nicholson =

American judge (1808–1876)

Alfred Nicholson
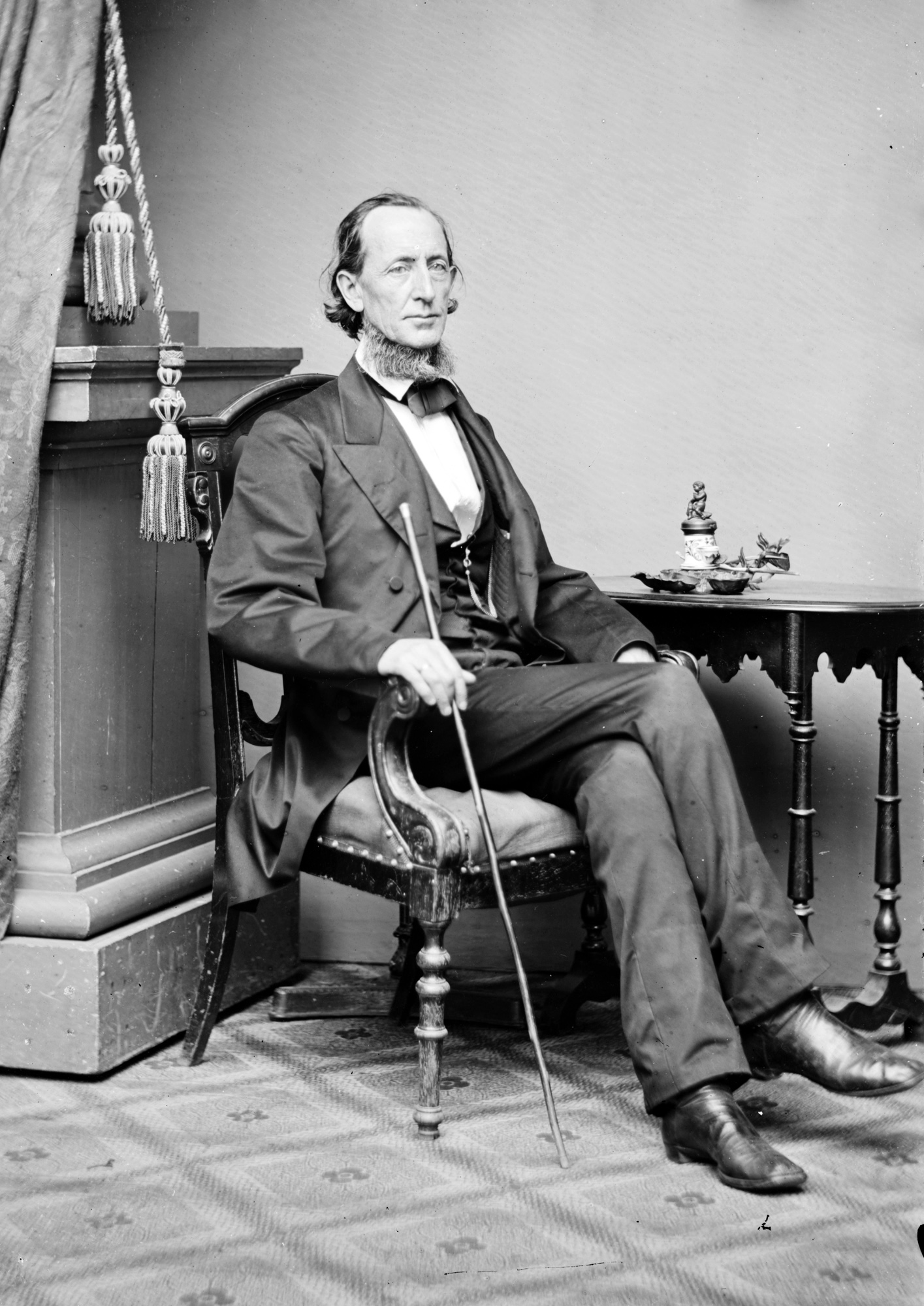

United States Senator from Tennessee
- In office March 4, 1859 – March 3, 1861
- Preceded by: John Bell
- Succeeded by: Joseph S. Fowler (1866)
- In office December 25, 1840 – February 7, 1842
- Appointed by: James K. Polk
- Preceded by: Felix Grundy
- Succeeded by: Ephraim H. Foster

Member of the Tennessee Senate
- In office 1843–1845

Member of the Tennessee House of Representatives
- In office 1833–1839

Personal details
- Born: Alfred Osborn Pope Nicholson; August 31, 1808 Franklin, Tennessee, U.S.
- Died: March 23, 1876 (aged 67) Columbia, Tennessee, U.S.
- Party: Democratic
- Education: University of North Carolina, Chapel Hill (BA)

Alfred Osborn Pope Nicholson (August 31, 1808 – March 23, 1876), was a lawyer, newspaper editor, banker, and politician from Tennessee. A Democrat, he was twice a US Senator from that state.

== Biography ==
Nicholson was born near Franklin, Tennessee, in Williamson County. He attended the University of North Carolina at Chapel Hill, graduating in 1827. He studied law and was admitted to the bar in 1831, opening a law practice in Columbia, Tennessee. He edited the Western Mercury, a paper then published in Columbia, from 1832 to 1835. He also served in the Tennessee House of Representatives from 1833 to 1839. In 1840 he was appointed, on an interim basis, to succeed to the US Senate seat vacated by the death of Senator Felix Grundy. He served in that office from December 25, 1840, to February 7, 1842. From 1843 to 1845 he served in the Tennessee State Senate, moving to Nashville during this period. He edited the Nashville Union from 1844 to 1846. From 1846 to 1847 he served as a director, and then as president, of the Bank of Tennessee. He owned slaves.

In 1853 President Franklin Pierce wished to appoint him to the Cabinet, but he declined to serve. He edited the Washington Union from 1853 to 1856 and subsequently served as public printer to the United States House of Representatives.

In 1859, Nicholson was elected to the US Senate by the Tennessee General Assembly. He served from March 4, 1859, to March 3, 1861, when he withdrew from participation in the Senate in anticipation of Tennessee declaring secession, which occurred the next month. Later in 1861, he formally resigned, as did all other Senators from Confederate states. (However, official Congressional biography of Nicholson claims he was expelled from Senate for sympathy to Confederacy.) Fellow Tennessee senator Andrew Johnson, a Southern Unionist, was the only U.S. senator from a Confederate state in rebellion that did not immediately resign upon learning of his state’s secession.

After the Civil War, Nicholson served as chief justice of the Tennessee Supreme Court from 1870 until his death.

He died on March 23, 1876, in Columbia, Tennessee. He was buried in Columbia's Rose Hill Cemetery.

== See also ==
- List of United States senators expelled or censured

U.S. Senate
Preceded by Felix Grundy	U.S. Senator (Class 1) from Tennessee; 1840–1842; Served alongside: Alexander O. Anderson	Succeeded by Ephraim H. Foster
Preceded by John Bell	U.S. Senator (Class 2) from Tennessee; 1859–1861; Served alongside: Andrew Johnson	Vacant Title next held by Joseph S. Fowler; 1866
