= Thomas Jefferson Foster =

American politician (1809–1887)

Confederate Congress

Personal details
- Born: July 11, 1809 Nashville, Tennessee, US
- Died: February 24, 1887 (aged 77)
- Party: Whig
- Spouse: Virginia Prudence Watkins
- Parent: Robert Coleman Foster (father)
- Profession: Planter

Military service
- Allegiance: Confederate States
- Branch/service: Confederate States Army
- Rank: Colonel
- Unit: 27th Alabama Infantry
- Battles/wars: American Civil War

Thomas Jefferson Foster (July 11, 1809 – February 24, 1887) was a soldier and prominent politician serving the Confederate States of America during the American Civil War. He served two terms in the Confederate Congress and was later elected to the United States Congress, but was denied his seat.

== Biography ==
Foster was born in Nashville, Tennessee, the son of a prominent state politician, Robert Coleman Foster, who had been president of the state senate. At the age of 24, Foster married Virginia Watkins, daughter of a wealthy plantation owner in Lawrence County, Alabama. The couple moved to Courtland, Alabama, where Foster amassed a fortune from his own successful farming endeavors.

With his state's secession, Foster raised the 27th Alabama, an infantry regiment in the Confederate army, and served as its first colonel. He was instrumental in urging the construction of Fort Henry to defend the vital Tennessee River, serving in the fort under General Lloyd Tilghman until its forces surrendered to Ulysses S. Grant.

He then represented Alabama as a representative in the First Confederate Congress and the Second Confederate Congress, where he became known as a "graceful orator and skillful debater". He served on the Committee on Territories and Public Lands and the Committee on Accounts.

In 1865, he was elected to the United States House of Representatives, but as a result of the policies of the Radical Republicans and Reconstruction, former Confederates such as Foster were denied their congressional seats.
