= Benjamin F. Cockrill Jr. =

American politician

- Born: August 9, 1866; Tennessee, U.S.
- Died: March 3, 1936 (aged 69)
- Resting place: Mount Olivet Cemetery
- Education: Washington and Lee University
- Occupations: Farmer, politician
- Political party: Democratic Party
- Spouse: Willie Christen
- Children: 2 sons, 2 daughters
- Parent(s): Benjamin F. Cockrill; Sarah "Sallie" Foster
- Relatives: John Cockrill (paternal great-great-grandfather); John Cockrill (paternal great-grandfather); Anne Robertson Johnson Cockrill (paternal great-grandmother); Mark R. Cockrill (paternal grandfather); Robert Coleman Foster (maternal great-grandfather); Ephraim H. Foster (maternal grandfather)

Benjamin F. Cockrill Jr. (1866–1936) was an American farmer and politician.

== Early life ==
Benjamin F. Cockrill Jr. was born in Tennessee in 1866. His father, Benjamin F. Cockrill, was the son of Mark R. Cockrill, a planter known as the "Wool King of the World". His paternal grandfather, John Cockrill, was a settler in Nashville, and his paternal great-grandfather, John Cockrill, was a Welsh-born planter of Scottish descent. His mother, Sarah "Sallie" Foster, was the daughter of Senator Ephraim H. Foster.

Cockrill graduated from Washington and Lee University with a bachelor of arts degree in 1883.

== Career ==
Cockrill was a farmer in Nashville. He raised stock in Warrenton, Virginia from 1890 to 1896, only to return to his Nashville farm. He established a new farm in West Nashville in 1902.

Cockrill was a member of the Democratic Party. He served as a member of the Tennessee House of Representatives from 1902 to 1905, representing Davidson County.

== Personal life and death ==
Cockrill married Willie Christen on November 26, 1887. They had two sons and two daughters. He was a member of the West Nashville Presbyterian Church, the Knights of Pythias, and the Royal Arcanum.

Cockrill died on March 3, 1936. He was buried at the Mount Olivet Cemetery in Nashville, Tennessee.
