= Sweetwater Mansion =

- U.S. National Register of Historic Places
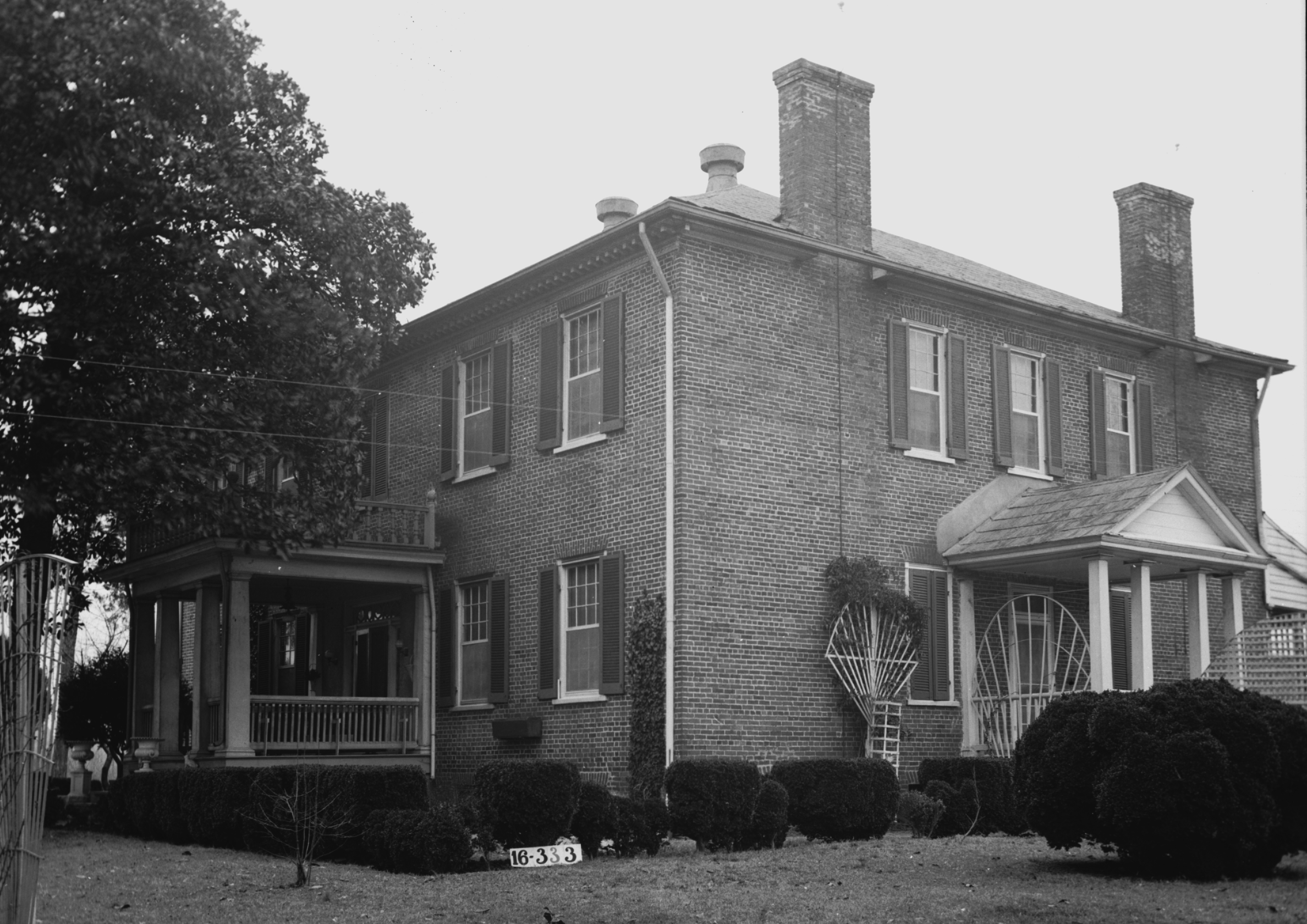
- Sweetwater Mansion in 1934

- Location within Alabama Location within the United States
- Location: Sweetwater and Florence Boulevard, Florence, Alabama
- Coordinates: 34°49′28.2720″N 87°38′34.3320″W
- Area: 8.84 acres (3.58 ha)
- Built: 1835
- NRHP reference No.: 76000335
- Added to NRHP: June 17, 1976

Sweetwater Mansion (also known as the Governor Robert Patton House), located in Florence, Alabama, is a plantation house designed by General John Brahan of the Alabama Militia.

== History ==
A veteran of the War of 1812, John Brahan owned more than 4,000 acres in eastern Lauderdale County, Alabama. The eight room home was built of bricks manufactured by Brahan's slaves on the site of Sweetwater Creek which lay just below the house. Sweetwater Mansion received its name from the creek and was first occupied by Brahan's son-in-law Robert M. Patton, a post-Civil War governor of Alabama, who completed the mansion in 1835.

The house was listed on the National Register of Historic Places in 1976.

== Legends and ghost stories ==
Stories of paranormal activity have been told about the house for many years. Numerous apparitions have allegedly been seen in and around the house.

Sweetwater Mansion was also featured as a haunted location on the paranormal TV series Most Terrifying Places in America which aired on the Travel Channel in 2019.
