= Felix Grundy =

American politician (1777–1840)

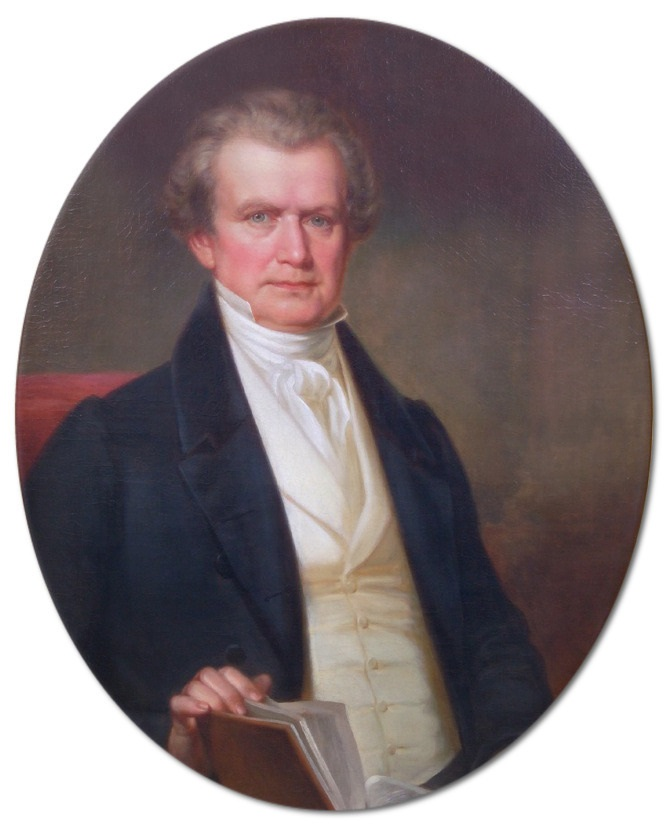

13th United States Attorney General
- In office July 5, 1838 – December 14, 1839
- President: Martin Van Buren
- Preceded by: Benjamin F. Butler
- Succeeded by: Henry D. Gilpin

United States Senator from Tennessee
- In office December 14, 1839 – December 19, 1840
- Preceded by: Ephraim H. Foster
- Succeeded by: Alfred O. P. Nicholson
- In office October 19, 1829 – July 4, 1838
- Preceded by: John Eaton
- Succeeded by: Ephraim H. Foster

Member of the U.S. House of Representatives from Tennessee
- In office March 4, 1811 – July 19, 1814
- Preceded by: Pleasant M. Miller (3rd); Constituency established (5th)
- Succeeded by: Thomas K. Harris (3rd); Newton Cannon (5th)
- Constituency: 3rd district (1811-13); 5th district (1813-14)

Member of the Tennessee House of Representatives
- In office 1817–1825

Chief Justice of the Kentucky Court of Appeals
- In office April 11, 1807 – 1808
- Preceded by: Thomas Todd
- Succeeded by: Ninian Edwards

Associate Justice of the Kentucky Court of Appeals
- In office December 10, 1806 – 1808

Member of the Kentucky House of Representatives
- In office 1804–1806
- Constituency: Nelson County
- In office 1800–1802
- Constituency: Washington County

Personal details
- Born: September 11, 1777 Berkeley County, Virginia, U.S. (now West Virginia)
- Died: December 19, 1840 (aged 63) Nashville, Tennessee, U.S.
- Party: Democratic-Republican (Before 1825); Democratic (1825–1840)
- Spouse: Ann Phillips Rodgers
- Relatives: Carrie Winder McGavock (granddaughter)

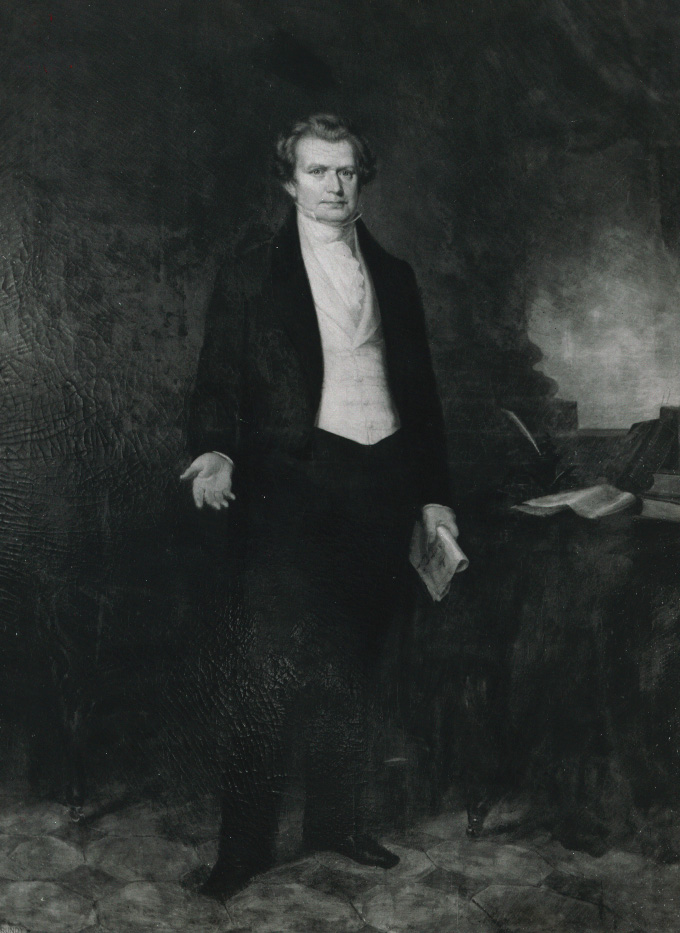
Portrait by George Dury, c.1858–1859

Felix Grundy (September 11, 1777 – December 19, 1840) was an American attorney and politician who served as the 13th U.S. attorney general. He also had served several terms as a congressman and as a U.S. senator from Tennessee. He was known for his success as a criminal lawyer who attracted crowds when he served on the defense.

== Biography ==
=== Early life ===
Born in Berkeley County, Virginia (now Berkeley County, West Virginia), Grundy moved with his parents to Brownsville, Pennsylvania, and then Kentucky. He was educated at home and at the Bardstown Academy in Bardstown, Kentucky. He read law as an apprentice with an established firm, was admitted to the Kentucky bar in 1799. That year he started practice in Springfield, Kentucky.

=== Career ===
In 1799, he was chosen to represent Washington County at the convention that drafted the second Kentucky Constitution. From 1800 to 1802, he represented Washington County in the Kentucky House of Representatives. He moved to Nelson County, and was elected to represent it in the Kentucky House for one term (1804–1806).

On December 10, 1806, he was commissioned an associate justice of the Kentucky Court of Appeals. Grundy was elevated to Chief Justice of the court on April 11, 1807.

Later that year, he resigned and moved to Nashville, Tennessee, where he again took up the practice of law. Grundy was opposed to the rising Kentucky politician (and later founder of the Whig Party), Henry Clay, whose Bluegrass interests clashed with Grundy's. The former chief justice left Kentucky in part because of Clay's growing presence in the state. In addition, Nashville was growing rapidly as the chief city in the Middle District of Tennessee. While soon renowned as a criminal lawyer in Tennessee, Grundy maintained his political ambition.

Grundy was elected as a Democratic-Republican to the 12th and 13th Congresses and served from March 4, 1811, until his resignation in July 1814.

He was elected and served as a member of the Tennessee House of Representatives from 1819 to 1825. In 1820 he was a commissioner to settle the boundary line (state line) between Tennessee and Kentucky.

He was elected as a Jacksonian in 1829 to the United States Senate to fill the vacancy in the term ending March 4, 1833, caused by the resignation of John H. Eaton to join the Cabinet of President Andrew Jackson. Reelected in 1832, Grundy served from October 19, 1829, to July 4, 1838, when he resigned to accept a Cabinet position. During his period in Congress, Grundy served as chairman of the Committee on Post Offices and Post Roads (21st through 24th Congresses), U.S. Senate Committee on the Judiciary (24th and 25th Congresses).

Grundy was appointed as Attorney General of the United States by President Martin Van Buren in July 1838. He resigned the post in December 1839, having been elected as a Democrat to the United States Senate on November 19, 1839, to fill the vacancy in the term commencing March 4, 1839, caused by the resignation of Ephraim Foster.

He resolved the question of whether he was eligible to be elected as Senator while holding the office of Attorney General by resigning on December 14, 1839. He was reelected by the Tennessee legislature to the Senate the same day, serving from December 14, 1839, until his death in Nashville, a little over a year later. During this stint in the US Senate, Grundy served as chairman of the U.S. Senate Committee on Revolutionary Claims in the 26th Congress.

=== Death and honors ===
Grundy was buried at Nashville City Cemetery in Nashville, Tennessee. After his death, four American counties were named in his honor. The four counties are located in Illinois, Iowa, Missouri and Tennessee. The county seat of Buchanan County, Virginia, Grundy Virginia, was named for Felix Grundy. Grundy was founded in 1858.

Both Grundy Center, Iowa, and its location of Grundy County, Iowa are also named in his honor. Grundy Center's annual festival, called "Felix Grundy Days", are held each July. This marks the start to the annual Grundy County Fair, located in Grundy Center.

=== Legacy ===
Grundy was a mentor to future President James K. Polk. Polk purchased Grundy's home in Nashville called "Grundy Place" and changed the name to "Polk Place". He lived and died there after his presidency. It was demolished in 1901.

== See also ==
- List of members of the United States Congress who died in office (1790–1899)

== Notes ==
=== Bibliography ===
- Biographical Cyclopedia of the Commonwealth of Kentucky. Chicago, Illinois: J.M. Gresham Company. 1896.
- Heller, John Roderick. Democracy's Lawyer: Felix Grundy of the Old Southwest (LSU Press, 2010), scholarly biography.
- Kanon, Tom. "'James Madison, Felix Grundy, and the Devil': A Western War Hawk in Congress." Filson History Quarterly 75 (2001): 433–68.

U.S. House of Representatives
Preceded by Pleasant Moorman Miller	Member of the U.S. House of Representatives from Tennessee's 3rd congressional district 1811-1813	Succeeded by Thomas K. Harris
Preceded by District created	Member of the U.S. House of Representatives from Tennessee's 5th congressional district 1813-1814	Succeeded by Newton Cannon
U.S. Senate
Preceded by John Eaton	U.S. senator (Class 1) from Tennessee; 1829–1838; Served alongside: Hugh L. White	Succeeded by Ephraim H. Foster
Preceded by Ephraim H. Foster	U.S. senator (Class 1) from Tennessee; 1839–1840; Served alongside: Hugh L. White, Alexander O. Anderson	Succeeded by Alfred O. P. Nicholson
Political offices
Preceded by John M. Clayton	Chairman of the Senate Judiciary Committee; 1836–1838	Succeeded by Garret D. Wall
Legal offices
Preceded by Benjamin F. Butler	U.S. Attorney General; Served under: Martin Van Buren; 1838–1840	Succeeded by Henry D. Gilpin
