= Thomas Johnson (Tennessee politician) =

American militia officer (1766–1826)

- Born: July 4, 1766; Near Salisbury, North Carolina
- Died: 1826 (aged 59–60)
- Known for: North Carolina and Tennessee state legislator, Tennessee state militia officer
- Children: Cave Johnson

Thomas Johnson (July 4, 1766–1826) was an American politician, militia officer, and early settler of Tennessee. He was a state legislator in North Carolina and Tennessee and a brigadier general of Tennessee militia, active during the late 18th century through the Creek War of 1813–1814.

== Life and career ==
According to Tennessee archivist John Trotwood Moore, his parents were Rachel Holman and Henry Johnson, Pennsylvanians who relocated to North Carolina around the time of the American Revolutionary War, in which H. Johnson served as a private in the Continental Army.

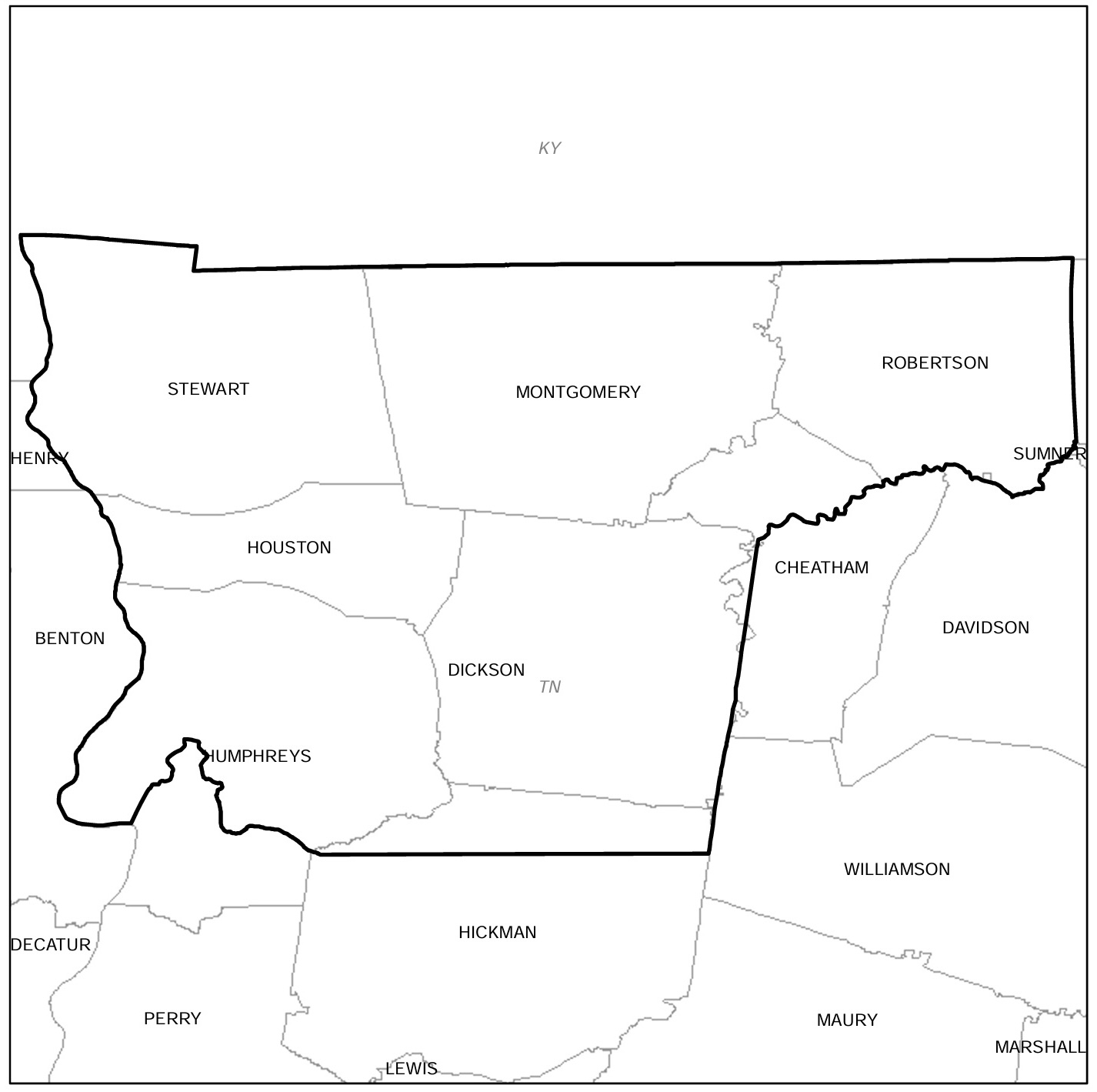
Tennessee County (1788–1796) boundaries

Thomas Johnson served in House of Representatives in the North Carolina General Assembly in 1789, representing Tennessee County. He worked as a surveyor in 1789 and later settled in the part of the Tennessee country that became Robertson County. He represented Robertson County in the Tennessee House of Representatives in the first session only (not the second session) of the first Tennessee state legislature in 1796. He participated in the Tennessee constitutional convention of 1796. He platted out Springfield, Tennessee, was the first clerk of Robertson County, and was circuit court clerk from 1809 to 1826.

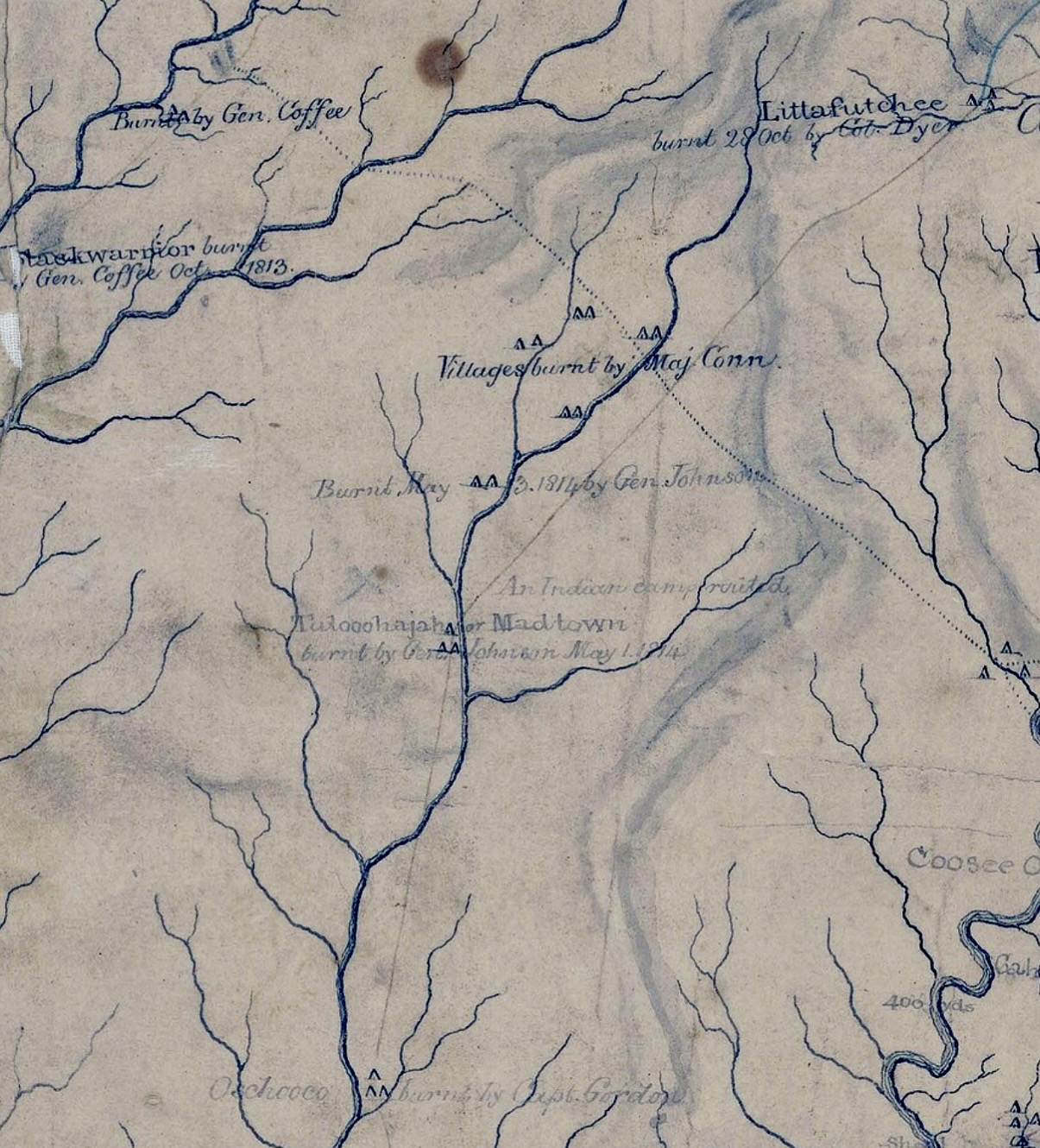
Muscogee villages on the Cahaba River "burnt...by Gen. Johnson" in May 1814 ("General Jackson's campaign against the Creek Indians 1813 & 1814")

As brigadier general of Tennessee militia he was involved in the Creek War of 1812–1813. Following an Indian attack on the Manley cabin in frontier Humphreys County on May 12, 1812, resulting in death of five children and the kidnapping of Martha Crawley, Johnson "dispatched a detachment of five hundred men within forty-eight hours of the affair, proclaiming his men were 'burning to avenge the cruel depredations.'"

He was an unsuccessful candidate in the 1815 Tennessee gubernatorial election.

Among his children were Tennessee politicians Willie Blount Johnson and Cave Johnson.

== See also ==
- Fayetteville Convention

== Sources ==
- Kanon, Tom (2014). Tennesseans at War, 1812–1815: Andrew Jackson, the Creek War, and the Battle of New Orleans. Tuscaloosa: University of Alabama Press. ISBN 9780817318291. LCCN 2013049815. OCLC 900093586. Project MUSE book 30812.
- Jackson, Andrew (1984). Moser, Harold; Macpherson, Sharon (eds.). The Papers of Andrew Jackson, Volume II, 1804–1813. University of Tennessee Press. doi:10.7290/utp3038. ISBN 978-0-87049-441-3.
- Robison, Dan M. (n.d.) [1971?]. "Johnson, Thomas (1766–1826)". Biographical Directory, Tennessee General Assembly, 1796–1969 : [preliminary sketches]. No. 01: Robertson County. Nashville, Tennessee: Tennessee State Library and Archives. pp. 19–20.
