= Mark R. Cockrill =

American cattleman, horse breeder and planter

- Born: Mark Robertson Cockrill; December 2, 1788; Nashville, Tennessee, U.S.
- Died: June 27, 1872 (aged 83); Nashville, Tennessee, U.S.
- Resting place: Mount Olivet Cemetery
- Occupations: Cattleman, horse breeder, planter
- Spouse: Susan Collingsworth
- Children: 3
- Parent(s): John Cockrill; Anne Robertson Johnson Cockrill
- Relatives: John Cockrill (paternal grandfather); James Robertson (maternal uncle); Felix Robertson (cousin); James Collinsworth (brother-in-law); Benjamin F. Cockrill Jr. (grandson); Edward Saunders Cheatham (son-in-law)

Mark Robertson Cockrill (1788–1872) was an American cattleman, horse breeder and planter. He was the owner of a large farm in Davidson County, Tennessee and a cotton plantation with 300 slaves in Mississippi. He won many prizes for his sheep-rearing both nationally and internationally, and he became known as the "Wool King of the World". He was a multi-millionaire prior to the American Civil War, and he loaned gold to the Confederate States of America during the war.

== Early life ==
Cockrill was born on December 2, 1788, in Nashville, Tennessee. His father was John Cockrill, the son of Welsh-born planter John Cockrill (of Scottish descent) and his wife, Anne. His parents owned a farm in modern-day Centennial Park. His maternal uncle, James Robertson, was an explorer and the co-founder of Nashville.

== Career ==
Cockrill raised cattle and bred horses on his 5,600-acre farm on Charlotte Pike in Nashville called Stock Place. He also raised swine and sheep. As early as 1815, he purchased merino sheep from William Jarvis for his farm. Additionally, Cockrill purchased the 1,000-acre Tulip Grove from Andrew Jackson Donelson for US$53,000 in 1854.

Cockrill won many prizes at the Middle Tennessee Fair and the Tennessee State Fair, two agricultural fairs. Additionally, he won a prize for the finest wool on exhibition at the 1851 World's fair in London, England. He was also the recipient of a gold medal from the Tennessee legislature "as a testimonial of distinguished merit and unrivaled success in wool-culture, and other agricultural pursuits" in 1854. He was featured in De Bow's Review for the superior wool of the sheep he raised. Additionally, he considered building cotton mills with four other planters in his county. He became known as the "Wool King of the World".

Cockrill was the owner of a cotton plantation in Mississippi, with 135 African slaves at one point. Prior to the American Civil War of 1861–1865, Cockrill sold the plantation and 240 slaves he owned; he retained 60 slaves and brought them to Tennessee. By then, he was worth an estimated US$2 million, and he was the richest Tennessean.

Cockrill was a supporter of the Confederate States of America during the American Civil War. He loaned US$25,000 in gold to the CSA, and he gave them wool to make Confederate uniforms. When the Union Army invaded, they took his land and stole his cattle. Cockrill was arrested and sent to jail for his Confederate support.

== Personal life, death and legacy ==
Cockrill married Susan Collinsworth, the daughter of Edward Collingsworth, a veteran of the American Revolutionary War and the War of 1812, and the sister of James Collinsworth, who served as the 1st Chief Justice of Texas from 1836 to 1838. They had three sons: Benjamin F. Cockrill, who married Sallie, the daughter of Senator Ephraim H. Foster; James Robertson Cockrill, who married his cousin Mary Cockrill; and Mark Stirling Cockrill, who married Mary Hill Goodloe. They also had three daughters: Julie, who married Edward S. Cheatham, the son of Congressman Richard Cheatham; Jane, who married William Watkins; and Henrietta, who married Albert Gallatin Ewing, a Confederate veteran who served under Nathan Bedford Forrest during the war.

Cockrill died on June 27, 1872, in Nashville, Tennessee. He was buried at the Mount Olivet Cemetery. His cattle was inherited by his son Mark S. Cockrill and his horses were inherited by his other son, Benjamin F. Cockrill. His daughter Henrietta inherited his house on Charlotte Avenue surrounded by 4,000 acres.

Cockrill was inducted into the Tennessee Agricultural Hall of Fame in 1944. The same year, a bronze plaque in his honor was installed at the Tennessee State Capitol.
