= Alabama Fever =

1817 North American land rush

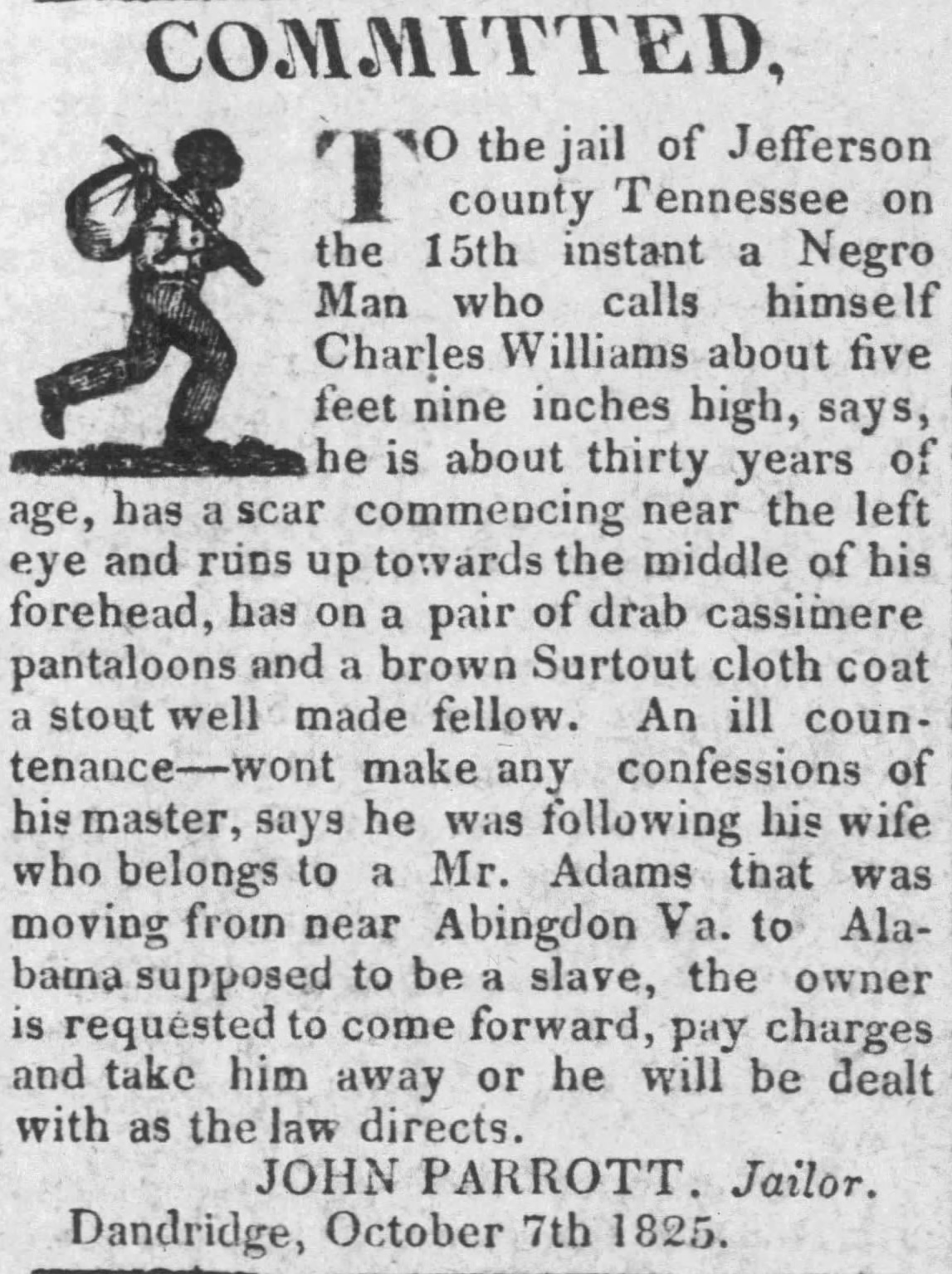
Mr. Adams of Abingdon, Virginia was migrating to Alabama in possession of the enslaved wife of Charles Williams ("Committed" Knoxville Register, October 21, 1825)

Alabama Fever was the land rush that occurred after 1817 as settlers and speculators moved in to establish land claims in the territory and U.S. State of Alabama as Native American tribes ceded territory. It came to be characterized as a movement of farmers and their slaves ever further west to new slave states and territories in the pursuit of fertile land for growing cotton. It was one of the first great American land booms until superseded by the California Gold Rush in 1848.

== History ==
The term Alabama Fever was used as early as 1817, during the Alabama Territory period (1817-1819). Settlers came primarily from the seaboard Old South states such as Virginia, North Carolina, South Carolina and eastern Georgia. There, land fertility had declined to a point that cotton cultivation had become difficult. Alabama had a population estimated at under 10,000 people in 1810, but it had increased to more than 300,000 people by 1830. Most Native American tribes were completely removed from the state within a few years of the passage of the Indian Removal Act by the United States Congress in 1830. By 1860 the population had increased to a total of 964,201 people, of which 435,080 were enslaved African Americans and 2,690 were free people of color.

== Causes ==
Global demand for cotton, spurred on by new industrial textile manufacturing processes, made its cultivation extremely lucrative. Alabama, Mississippi, and Louisiana were producing half of the cotton in the United States by 1834. Along with Georgia, this had grown to 78% by 1859.

Cotton cultivation quickly exhausted most soils, causing cotton yields to dwindle within a few decades. In an era before inorganic fertilizers, this made a continually expanding frontier necessary so that settlers and their slaves could relocate further westward in an effort to keep production as high as possible. Cotton tycoons even looked at the possibility of conquering and annexing territory in the Caribbean and Central America for future cotton cultivation, due to increased northern resistance to the expansion of slavery in the United States and the arid regions of the west being unsuited for cotton production.

== See also ==
- Alabama real estate bubble of the 1810s

== Bibliography ==
- Colliers Encyclopedia, vol. 1 of 24, editors: Lauren Bahr & Bernard Johnston, PF Collier : Company (1994), "Alabama Fever - Mass Movement to Alabama"
- Clark, Christopher (2006). Social Change in America: From the Revolution Through the Civil War. Chicago: Ivan R. Dee.
