= Tennessee Medical Association =

The Tennessee Medical Association (TMA) is a professional organization for Doctors of Medicine (M.D.) and Doctors of Osteopathic Medicine (D.O.) in Tennessee. The group predates the national association, the American Medical Association, by well over a decade.

== History ==
Felix Robertson was a charter member of the TMA and president of the "Medical Society of Tennessee" (original name) in 1834–1840 and 1853–1855.

== Projects ==
The TMA organizes an annual conference and publishes a journal, Tennessee Medicine.

== People ==
In May 2013 Christopher E. Young became the 159th president of the TMA.
