= Anne Robertson Cockrill =

American pioneer, landowner

- Born: Anne Gower Robertson; February 10, 1757; Wake County, North Carolina, British America
- Died: October 13, 1821 (aged 64); Tennessee
- Resting place: Nashville City Cemetery
- Occupation: Landowner
- Spouse: John Cockrill (second husband)
- Children: 3 (by first husband); 8, including Mark R. Cockrill (by second husband)
- Relatives: James Robertson (brother); Felix Robertson (nephew); Benjamin F. Cockrill Jr. (great-grandson)

Anne Gower Cockrill (née Robertson, formerly Johnson (or Johnston); February 10, 1757–October 13, 1821) was an American frontierswoman, teacher, land owner, and one of the first white settlers of the Cumberland Settlement in Tennessee. She became the first woman to receive a land grant in Tennessee. Her first name is sometimes spelled Ann.

== Early life ==
Anne Gower Robertson was born on February 10, 1757, in Wake County, North Carolina to John Randolph Robertson and Mary (Gower) Blakely. Her brother, James Robertson (1742-1814), founded Fort Nashborough alongside John Donelson (1718–1785).

== Adult life ==
She moved to Fort Watauga in North Carolina, and later moved to Fort Caswell. When it was attacked by Native Americans, she led a group of women to throw boiling water at them to ward them off.

Her first husband (surnamed Johnson or Johnston) was a justice of the peace in the Washington District of East Tennessee and was killed in an accident.

After he died, Cockrill and her three small daughters joined Colonel John Donelson in the migration of the first pioneers on a flatboat to go down the Cumberland River to Tennessee to the Cumberland settlements. The exhibition was intended to bring families of the men who settled Nashville there. During the journey, she taught the children in the boat to make small wooden boxes, filling them with river sand, and drawing letters and numbers in the sand. She was later honored as Middle Tennessee's first teacher.

In 1784, she received a land grant for 640-acre from the North Carolina legislature; she was the first woman in this position. The land was then known as Cockrill Springs and was situated on what is now Centennial Park in Nashville, Tennessee, near the campus of Vanderbilt University. There is now a monument in her memory there.

She wed John Cockrill in 1784; they had eight children.

== Death ==
She died on October 13, 1821, aged 64, in Tennessee. She was buried in the Nashville City Cemetery.
