= Nashville City Cemetery =

Historic cemetery in Tennessee, United States

- U.S. National Register of Historic Places
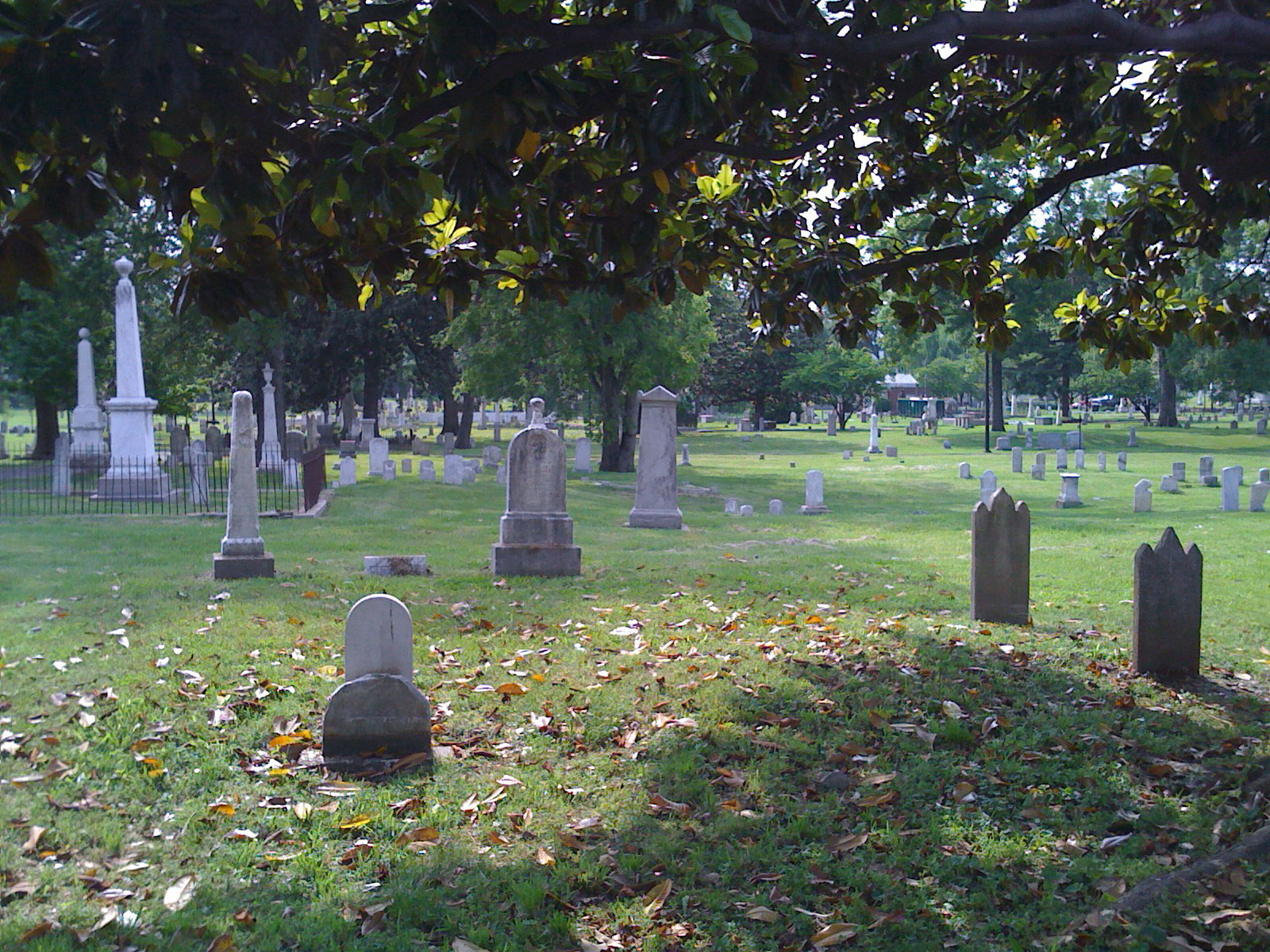

- Location within Tennessee Location within the United States
- Location: 1001 4th Ave. S. Nashville, Tennessee
- Coordinates: 36°8′50″N 86°46′11″W
- Built: 1822
- Architect: William Strickland
- NRHP reference No.: 72001235
- Added to NRHP: October 18, 1972

Nashville City Cemetery is the oldest public cemetery in Nashville, Tennessee. Many of Nashville's prominent historical figures are buried there. It includes the tombs of 22,000 people, 6,000 of whom were African Americans.

== Overview ==
Nashville City Cemetery was opened on January 1, 1822. By 1850, over 11,000 people were buried there. In 1958, Nashville Mayor Ben West led an effort to restore and preserve the cemetery. In 1972, it was listed in the National Register of Historic Places due to its historical and architectural significance.

Among those interred in the cemetery are two of Nashville's founders, four Confederate generals, one Tennessee Governor, and twenty-two mayors of Nashville. Also buried there are numerous soldiers, schoolteachers, former slaves, early civic leaders, and other interesting citizens of Nashville. Sea Captain William Driver, who coined the name "Old Glory" for his ship's U.S. Flag and hid that famous flag during the Civil War, is buried here. By 2017, the cemetery included the tombs of approximately 22,000 people, 6,000 of which were African Americans. On March 4, 2017, Elias Polk and Matilda Polk, who were enslaved by President James K. Polk, had their tombstones replaced as part of an effort to recognize more African-Americans buried at the cemetery.

Nashville City Cemetery is located near downtown Nashville at 1001 4th Avenue South.

== Notable buried ==
- Lt. Lipscomb Norvell – Revolutionary War Soldier and father of US Senator John Norvell.
- Samuel R. Anderson – Confederate brigadier general in the Civil War.
- Gen. Felix Kirk Zollicoffer – Confederate general, U.S. Congressman, journalist, Tennessee militiaman.
- Washington Barrow – U.S. Charges d'Affaires to Portugal; U.S. Congressman from 1847 to 1849.
- William Carroll – Governor of Tennessee from 1821 to 1827 and again from 1829 to 1835.
- Thomas Claiborne – U.S. Congressional Representative from 1817 to 1819.
- Charles Dickinson – Killed by Andrew Jackson in 1806 duel.
- William Driver – Coined the name Old Glory for the U.S. flag in 1831.
- Richard S. Ewell – Civil War Confederate General, corps commander, Army of Northern Virginia.
- Francis Fogg – Developed Nashville's public school system in 1852.
- Harlan Howard – Prolific American songwriter, principally in country music.
- Mabel Imes and Ella Sheppard – two of the original Fisk Jubilee Singers.
- John Patton Erwin – Mayor of Nashville from 1821 to 1822, and from 1834 to 1835.
- Alexander Porter – U.S. Senator who represented Louisiana.
- Felix Robertson – Mayor of Nashville from 1818 to 1819, and from 1827 to 1829.
- Anne Robertson Johnson Cockrill – pioneer.
- James Robertson and his wife, Charlotte Robertson – two of the founders of Nashville (then called Fort Nashborough)
- Wilkins F. Tannehill – Mayor of Nashville from 1825 to 1827.
- Charles Clay Trabue – Member of the Missouri House of Representatives from 1824 to 1828 and Mayor of Nashville from 1839 to 1841.
- Ben West – 62nd Mayor of Nashville from 1951 to 1963.
- Elias Polk – Enslaved body servant to James K. Polk and later political activist.
