= Robert Coleman Foster =

American attorney and politician (1769–1844)

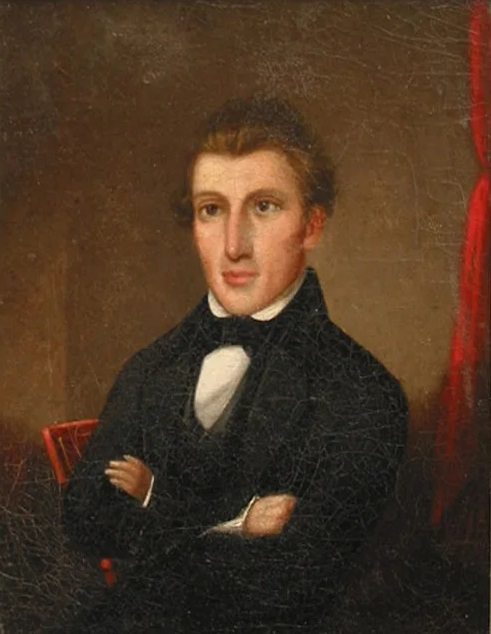

Speaker of the Tennessee Senate
- In office 1813–1815
- Preceded by: Thomas Henderson
- Succeeded by: Edward Ward

Speaker of the Tennessee House of Representatives
- In office 1805–1807
- Preceded by: James Stuart
- Succeeded by: John Tipton

Personal details
- Born: July 8, 1769 Virginia, US
- Died: September 27, 1844 (aged 75) Nashville, Tennessee, US
- Resting place: Nashville City Cemetery, Tennessee, US
- Spouse: Ann Hubbard
- Children: Thomas Jefferson Foster (son); Robert Coleman Foster Jr. (son); Ephraim H. Foster (son)

Robert Coleman Foster I (July 8, 1769 – September 27, 1844) was an American attorney and politician.

== Biography ==
Foster was born in Virginia on July 8, 1769. He was married to Ann Hubbard. He settled near Bardstown, Kentucky, where his son Ephraim was born in 1794, before moving his family to Nashville in 1797. He was one of Nashville's earliest residents, and one of the original twelve trustees of Davidson Academy, which eventually became Peabody College, and eventually part of Vanderbilt University.

Foster was elected to the Tennessee General Assembly as a member of Tennessee House of Representatives, serving from 1803 to 1807, including a term as speaker of the House in the 6th General Assembly, from 1805 to 1807. He served in the Tennessee Senate in the 8th, 9th, 10th, and 16th General Assemblies (1809–1815 and 1825–1827) and was elected Speaker of the Senate in 1813 and 1825. He was a candidate for governor in 1815 and 1817, running unsuccessfully against Joseph McMinn.

Foster died on September 27, 1844, and is buried in the Nashville City Cemetery.

Three of Foster's sons: Robert, Ephraim and Thomas, became politicians.

== Sources ==
- Zollicoffer-Bond, Octavia. (November 14, 1909). "The Foster Family." The Nashville American.
