= Felix Robertson =

American physician (1781–1865)

- Born: January 11, 1781; Nashville, Tennessee, U.S.
- Died: July 10, 1865 (aged 84)
- Resting place: Nashville City Cemetery
- Education: University of Pennsylvania
- Occupations: Physician, politician
- Spouse: Lydia Waters
- Children: 5 sons, 2 daughters
- Parent(s): James Robertson; Charlotte Reeves
- Relatives: Sterling C. Robertson (cousin); Anne Robertson Johnson Cockrill (aunt); Mark R. Cockrill (cousin)

The Cooper portrait

Felix Robertson (1781–1865) was an American pioneer, medical doctor and Jeffersonian Republican politician. He served twice as the Mayor of Nashville, Tennessee from 1818 to 1819 as well as from 1827 to 1829.

== Early life ==
Felix Robertson was born on January 11, 1781, at the fort Freeland's Station, which was later commemorated as a neighborhood of Nashville. He was born to General James Robertson and his wife Charlotte Reeves, who had arrived with the first large group of settlers in Middle Tennessee. He was the first known white child born in the settlement now called Nashville, while his father is regarded as the "Father of Tennessee" in history books.

Robertson studied medicine under the direction of Benjamin Rush at the University of Pennsylvania, where he received his M.D. degree in 1806.

== Career ==
Robertson practiced medicine in Nashville for forty years. He was credited with pioneering the use of quinine in Tennessee. He served as Mayor of Nashville from 1818 to 1819 as well as from 1827 to 1829. He later took part in Robertson's Colony with his cousin Sterling C. Robertson, but they returned to Tennessee. He delivered a speech at the 26th annual meeting of the Tennessee Medical Society detailing the early physicians and medical practices in the early settlement of Nashville. He went on to work as a professor of medicine at the former University of Nashville. He served as director of the Medical Society of Tennessee from 1834 through 1840 and again in 1853 for two years. He was a close friend and personal doctor of President Andrew Jackson (1767–1845). He worked on his 1828 presidential campaign.

== Personal life, death and legacy ==
Robertson married Lydia Waters on October 9, 1808. They had five sons, James Waters, Benjamin, John E. Beck, Felix (died as infant), and Felix Randolph, and two daughters, Elizabeth, Elnora Reeves. He died on July 10, 1865, and he is buried in the Nashville City Cemetery. His tombstone is inscribed with the epitaph "First white child born in settlement now called Nashville; Distinguished as a physician; Foremost as citizen."

His son, James Waters Robertson (1812–1836), went to Texas from Louisiana, took part in the Siege of Bexar during the Texas revolution and later served in the Alamo garrison. He died in the Battle of the Alamo on March 6, 1836.

His portrait, painted by Washington Bogart Cooper in July 1839, hangs in the Tennessee State Museum in Nashville.

Political offices
| Preceded by Stephen Cantrell Jr. | Mayor of Nashville, Tennessee; 1818-1819 | Succeeded by Thomas Crutcher |
| Preceded by Wilkins F. Tannehill | Mayor of Nashville, Tennessee; 1827-1829 | Succeeded by William Armstrong |
