= James Robertson (explorer) =

Explorer and pioneer, born 1742

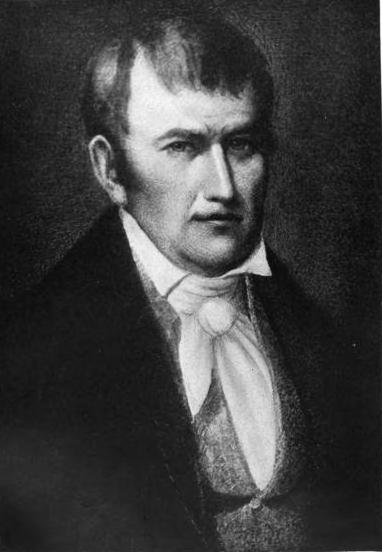
- "Father of Tennessee"; Copy of James Robertson portrait (Original by Washington Bogart Cooper)
- Born: June 28, 1742; Brunswick County, Virginia, British America
- Died: September 1, 1814 (aged 72); Chickasaw Bluff, Tennessee
- Burial place: Nashville City Cemetery; Nashville, Tennessee
- Relatives: Charlotte Reeves (wife); Anne Robertson Johnson Cockrill (sister)
- Military career
- Allegiance: United States of America
- Branch: Southwest Territory militia
- Rank: Brigadier General
- Commands: Mero District militia
- Conflicts: Cherokee–American wars

James Robertson (June 28, 1742 – September 1, 1814) was an American frontiersman, soldier and agent in dealing with the Native Americans, and one of the founding fathers of what became the State of Tennessee. An early companion of frontiersman Daniel Boone, Robertson helped establish the Watauga Association in the early 1770s, and to defend Fort Watauga from an attack by Cherokee in 1776. In 1779, he co-founded what is now Nashville, and was instrumental in the settlement of Middle Tennessee. He served as a brigadier general in the Southwest Territory militia in the early 1790s, and as an Indian Commissioner in later life.

== Early life and education ==
Robertson was born in 1742 in Brunswick County, Virginia, of Scots-Irish and English descent, to John Randolph Robertson and Mary (Gower) Blakely. Around 1749, his father relocated the family to Wake County, North Carolina. Robertson worked with his siblings on their family farm and had limited formal education, but he learned to track and hunt animals and know his way in the woods and waterways.

== Marriage and career ==
Robertson returned to North Carolina and married Charlotte Reeves in 1767. They started farming. In 1769, Robertson accompanied explorer Daniel Boone on his third expedition to lands beyond the Allegheny Mountains. The party discovered the "Old Fields" (lands previously cultivated by generations of Native Americans) along the Watauga River valley, where Elizabethton, Tennessee later developed. Robertson stopped here to plant corn while Boone continued on to Kentucky.

After returning to North Carolina, Robertson became involved with the Regulator movement. They recruited a group of settlers to return to the Watauga River valley, which they believed to be in Virginia (at that time including present-day West Virginia). In 1772, Robertson and the pioneers who had settled in Northeast Tennessee (along the Watauga, Doe, Holston and Nolichucky rivers) met at Sycamore Shoals to establish an independent regional government known as the Watauga Association.

However, in 1772, surveyors placed the land officially within the domain of the Cherokee tribe, who had long occupied this area. They required the settlers to negotiate a lease to cultivate and settle on their land. As the signed lease was being celebrated, a Cherokee warrior was murdered by a white man. Robertson's skillful diplomacy made peace with the irate Cherokee, who threatened to expel the settlers by force if necessary.

In 1775, a treaty meeting was held between the Cherokee and a delegation of the Transylvania Company, headed by Richard Henderson. Under the Treaty of Sycamore Shoals (or the Treaty of Watauga), the Transylvania Company purchased a vast amount of land from the Cherokee, including most of present-day Kentucky and part of Tennessee. The treaty was technically illegal since only the government could have formal transactions and purchase land from Native American tribes. (The British, the colonial governments of Virginia and North Carolina and, later, the United States, all forbade private purchase of land from Indians).

During the treaty process, Dragging Canoe, son of Cherokee chief Attacullaculla, made a speech condemning the sale of any Cherokee land, which the tribe held in common for the use of all. He broke from the general Cherokee tribal government to form a band that the pioneers called the Chickamauga Cherokee or Chickamauga, for their settlement, although the people never had a separate tribal identity. After Henderson's Transylvania Company had bought Kentucky (although other tribes such as the Shawnee also claimed it), Daniel Boone was hired to widen the Indian path over Cumberland Gap to facilitate migration by Anglo-American pioneers. This road became known as the Wilderness Road.

Robertson's group lived at Watauga in peace until July 1776, when Chief Old Abraham of Chilhowee led a Cherokee contingent that attacked Fort Watauga (a defensive log fort built by the Watauga Association). A 40-man contingent commanded by John Carter, with Robertson and John Sevier as lieutenants, withstood a siege of about two weeks. After the Cherokee were subjugated later that year, the governor of North Carolina appointed Robertson as Indian agent to reside at the Cherokee capital. He was to prevent them from forming an alliance with the British to fight as their allies against the rebels during the American Revolution.

== Fort Nashborough ==
In the spring of 1779, during the Revolutionary War, Robertson and John Donelson founded Fort Nashborough, later to become Nashville. It was then part of the Washington District, North Carolina. He represented Davidson County (home of Fort Nashborough in present-day Tennessee, not to be confused with the modern Davidson County, North Carolina), in the North Carolina legislature and had the settlement established as a town. He also established the first school there, the historic Davidson Academy for male students.

The Spanish governor of former French territory west of the Mississippi River offered Robertson peace and the free navigation of the Mississippi in exchange for his leaving the United States and establishing — along with the Watauga settlement and Kentucky — an independent government. He refused to consider the matter.

In 1790, Robertson was appointed brigadier-general of the territorial militia by U.S. President George Washington, serving until 1796. He shared with Sevier the honor and affection of Tennesseans. He was appointed as Indian commissioner, serving until his death in 1814.

== Death and legacy ==
Robertson died near Memphis and was buried there. His family had his remains moved and re-interred in 1825 in the Nashville City Cemetery, to memorialize his contributions there.

Robertson and his wife had several children:

- Jonathan Friar Robertson m. Ciddy Davis
- James Randolph Robertson, "beheaded by the Indians and the head was paraded on a pole at their camp" circa 1794, possibly triggering the unauthorized Nickajack Expedition
- Delilah Robertson m. John Bosley
- Peyton Henderson Robertson (c. 1775–1787), beheaded "by Indians"
- Charlotte Robertson, died young
- Felix Robertson m. Lydia Waters; served as Mayor of Nashville from 1818 to 1819
- Charlotte Robertson m. Richard C. Napier
- William Blount Robertson m. Leodocia Erwin
- Peyton Robertson m. Ellen Davis
- Lavinia Robertson m (1) John Beck Jr., (2) John B. Craighead
- John McNairy Robertson m. Lucy Scale

Robertson's great-granddaughter, Medora Cheatham, married Telfair Hodgson Jr., the treasurer of Sewanee: The University of the South and a developer of Belle Meade, Tennessee. She was the honorary president-general of the United Daughters of the Confederacy (UDC).

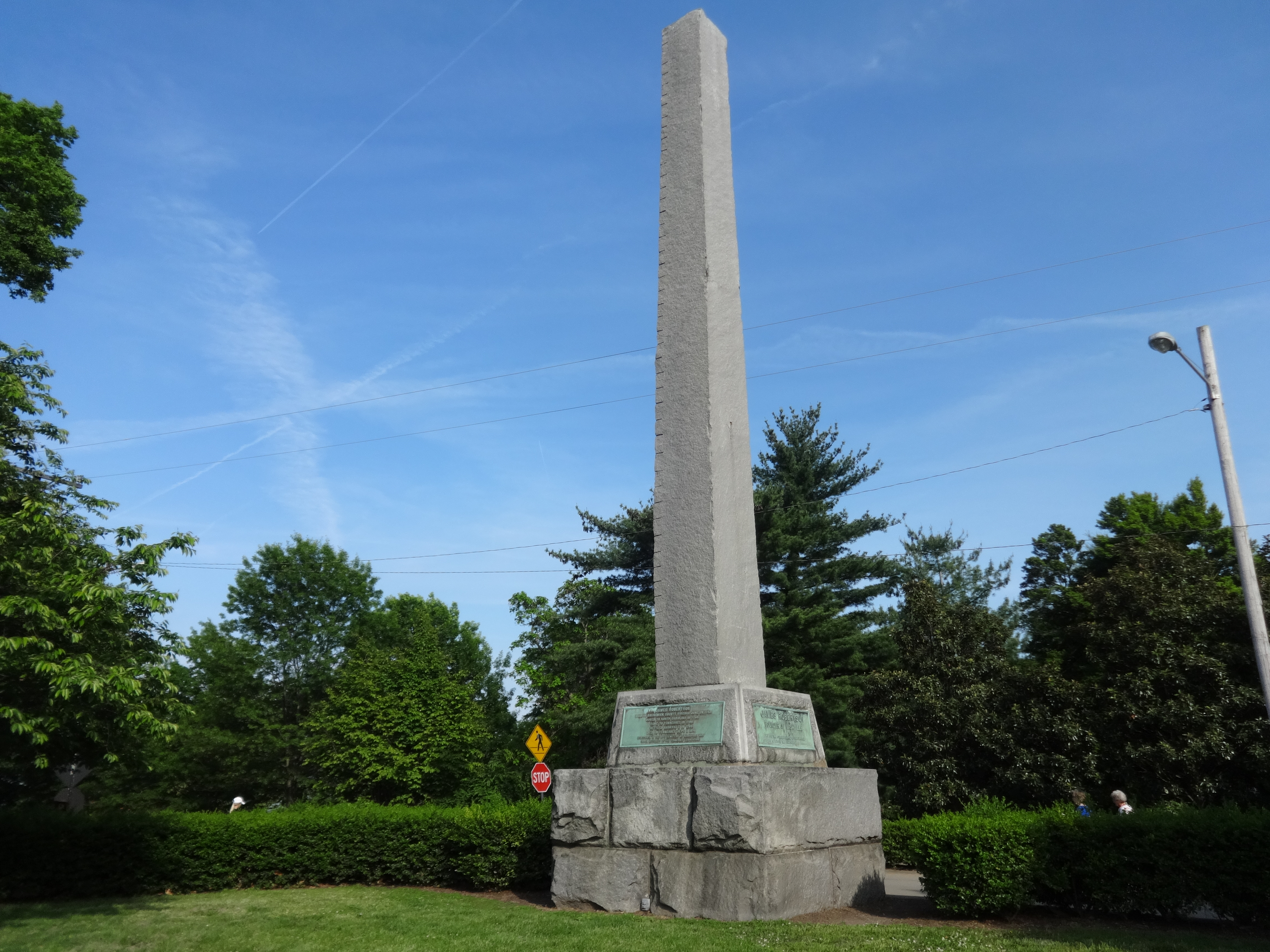
The James Robertson obelisk in Centennial Park, Nashville, Tennessee

== Legacy and honors ==
- Robertson County, Tennessee was named in his honor in 1796
- A memorial obelisk was installed in his honor in the Nashville City Cemetery.
- In World War II the United States liberty ship SS James Robertson was named in his honor.
- A memorial plaque is installed on a large rock that gives directions to where his family home in Wake County NC was. This plaque is located at the intersection of Battle Bridge Road and Auburn Knightdale Road. And can be seen here;

== See also ==
- Overmountain Men
- Valentine Sevier
- Isaac Shelby
- Daniel Boone

== Sources ==
- Kelley, Sarah Foster (1987). West Nashville: Its People and Environs. Nashville, Tennessee: Douglas Printing, Inc. ISBN 978-0-9615960-0-2. LCCN 87174035. OCLC 17229742.
