= Robert Weakley =

American politician (1764–1845)

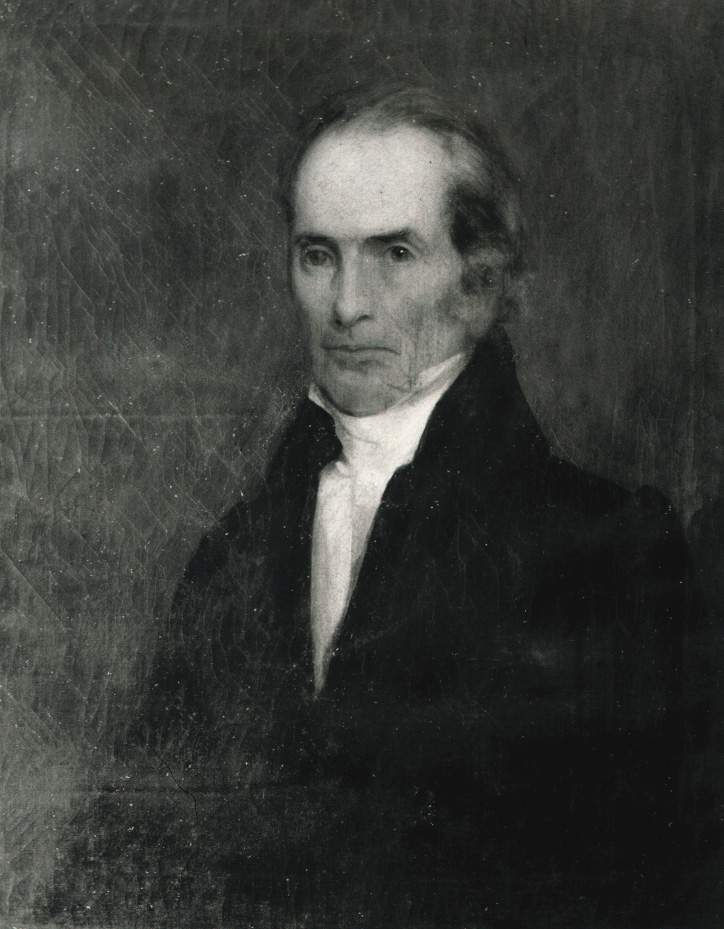
- Portrait of Weakley by Washington B. Cooper

Member of the U.S. House of Representatives from Tennessee's 2nd district
- In office March 4, 1809 – March 3, 1811
- Preceded by: George W. Campbell
- Succeeded by: John Sevier

Member of the Tennessee Senate
- In office 1799; 1803; 1807; 1819

Personal details
- Born: July 20, 1764 Halifax County, Virginia Colony, British America
- Died: February 4, 1845 (aged 80) Nashville, Tennessee, U.S.
- Resting place: Mount Olivet Cemrtery; Nashville, Tennessee
- Spouse: Jane Locke Weakly
- Children: Mary, Narcissa, Robert Locke, Jane Baird
- Profession: farmer, surveyor

Robert Weakley (July 20, 1764 – February 4, 1845) was an American politician who represented Tennessee in the United States House of Representatives from 1809 to 1811.

== Early life ==
Weakley was born in Halifax County in the Colony of Virginia on July 20, 1764, and he attended schools in Princeton, New Jersey. He married Jane Locke, of Salisbury, North Carolina, in 1791. They had four children, Mary, Narcissa, Robert Locke and Jane Baird.

== Career ==
Weakley joined the Revolutionary Army at the age of sixteen and served until the close of the American Revolutionary War, fighting in the battles of Alamance and Guilford Courthouse.

On April 18, 1782, Weakley left his home in Halifax County with a horse, bridle and saddle, and $1.75. He went to Rowan County, North Carolina to study surveying with General Griffith Rutherford. During the winter of 1783, he moved to the Cumberland settlements, and set up residence on Whites Creek in Davidson County. He moved to his estate in Nashville, "Lockeland", in 1800.

Weakley was also a cofounder of the town of Jefferson in Rutherford County, Tennessee. He and Thomas Bedford, a fellow land speculator, were granted as assignees a North Carolina land grant and had laid out 102 town lots and a Public Square by 1803, at the junction of the East and West Forks of the Stones River. The town of Jefferson was the first county seat of government for Rutherford County, and contributed immensely to the early economic development of the area during the first decade after its formation. The Stones River provided for direct access for goods and commodities such as timber and other cash crops to be shipped by flat boat to the Cumberland River and Nashville and thereby to far away ports such as New Orleans, Pittsburg, and beyond.

In 1819, Weakley, along with several other notable early Nashville residents such as Dr. John Shelby, petitioned the Tennessee Assembly for permission to establish the Nashville Bridge Company. Weakley and Shelby subsequently served as commissioners for the newly formed company. By 1823, the Nashville Bridge Company's first bridge project, which was also the first covered bridge to span the Cumberland River, was completed near the Public Square in Nashville at a cost of $75,000. This bridge was demolished in 1851 to allow for larger and taller steamboats to access the commercial wharfs at Nashville.

In 1785, Weakley moved to the part of North Carolina that later became Tennessee and engaged in agricultural pursuits. He was a member of the North Carolina convention that ratified the Constitution of the United States in 1789. In 1791 he was the brigade inspector of the militia of Mero District, in what was then the Southwest Territory. In 1796 he was elected to the first Tennessee House of Representatives. In 1798, he was a colonel in the 2nd Regiment of the Davidson County Militia. He served in the Tennessee Senate in 1799, 1803, 1807 and 1819.

Weakley was elected as a Democratic-Republican to the Eleventh Congress, which lasted from March 4, 1809 to March 3, 1811.

In 1819, Weakley was appointed commissioner to treat with the Chickasaw Indians. He served as Speaker of the Tennessee Senate from 1819 to 1821 and from 1823 to 1825. He was a member of the state constitutional convention in 1834.

== Death and legacy ==
Weakley died near Nashville, Tennessee on February 4, 1845 (age 80 years, 199 days). He was interred in the family vault at "Lockeland," on his estate in what is now East Nashville. He was reinterred at Nashville's Mount Olivet Cemetery in 1947. Weakley County, Tennessee is named for him.

According to memoirist Jane Thomas, "Old Mr. Robert Weakley was a very influential, intelligent man. Mr. Jim Richardson has his summer home where Mr. Robert Weakley used to live. He had three daughters and one son. His eldest daughter married Jack Reid, and went to Huntsville to live. His second daughter married Maj. Hickman. His youngest daughter married Lucian Brown. His son married Miss Manford, of Boston, who was a beautiful and accomplished woman. They lived in Rutherford county. Mr. Robert Weakley's brother, Sam, owned a farm where Mr. Irby Morgan's nursery used to be. His son, Dr. Weakley, was a Methodist preacher, and married Miss Porter, the daughter of a Methodist preacher of Williamson County."

U.S. House of Representatives
Preceded by George W. Campbell	Member of the U.S. House of Representatives from Tennessee's 2nd congressional district 1809–1811	Succeeded by John Sevier
