= Allison House =

Allison House may refer to:

- Allison House, a house on Colonial Street at the Universal Studios Lot in Universal City, California
- George Allison House, Live Oak, Florida, listed on the National Register of Historic Places (NRHP)
- Allison Mansion, Indianapolis, Indiana, listed on the NRHP in Marion County
- Allison-Robinson House, Spencer, Indiana, listed on the NRHP in Owen County
- Allison-Barrickman House, Harrods Creek neighborhood of Louisville, Kentucky, listed on the NRHP in Jefferson County
- Allison-Reinkeh House, Hamilton, Montana, listed on the NRHP in Ravalli County
- Capt. Samuel Allison House, Dublin, New Hampshire, listed on the NRHP in Cheshire County
- Allison Dormitory, Santa Fe, New Mexico, listed on the NRHP in Santa Fe County
- Allison Woods, Statesville, North Carolina, listed on the NRHP in Iredell County
- Allison Ranger Station, Burns, Oregon, listed on the NRHP
- Potter-Allison Farm, Centre Hall, Pennsylvania, listed on the NRHP in Centre County
- William Allison House (Spring Mills, Pennsylvania), listed on the NRHP in Centre County
- Robert Barnwell Allison House, Lancaster, South Carolina, listed on the NRHP in Lancaster County
- Allison Plantation, York, South Carolina, listed on the NRHP in York County
- William Allison House (College Grove, Tennessee), listed on the NRHP in Williamson County
- Ratcliffe-Logan-Allison House, Fairfax, Virginia, listed on the NRHP

== See also ==
- William Allison House (disambiguation)
