= William Allison House =

William Allison House may refer to:

- William Allison House (Spring Mills, Pennsylvania), listed on the National Register of Historic Places in Centre County, Pennsylvania
- William Allison House (College Grove, Tennessee), listed on the National Register of Historic Places in Williamson County, Tennessee

== See also ==
- Allison House (disambiguation)
