= College Grove =

College Grove may refer to:

- College Grove Methodist Church
- College Grove Shopping Center, San Diego
- College Grove (sports ground), a multi sport facility in the UK
- College Grove, Tennessee
- College Grove, Western Australia
