= Bethesda, Tennessee =

Bethesda
- Unincorporated community
- Location within Tennessee Location within the United States
- Coordinates: 35°45′40.4″N 86°47′34.2″W
- Country: United States
- State: Tennessee
- Counties: Williamson
- Elevation: 801 ft (244 m)
- Time zone: UTC-6 (CST)
  - Summer (DST): UTC-5 (CDT)

Bethesda, Tennessee is an unincorporated community in rural southeastern Williamson County, Tennessee.

== History ==
According to a 1988 study of Williamson County historical resources, conducted by staff of the Tennessee Historical Commission:

Bethesda was formed along Rutherford Creek in the early 1800s as a small community serving the needs of area farms. Several early settlers built log and frame homes in the area such as the Bond and Steele families. The Bethesda Methodist Church was organized in 1832 and a brick church was constructed in 1844. Of the homes constructed in the Bethesda area the William Steele House is the most notable and unaltered. No historic commercial buildings survive.

In the spring of 1861 the Webb Guards company of the Tennessee infantry was raised from the towns of Triune, College Grove, Peytonsville and Bethesda. The company was then organized as Company D of the 20th Tennessee Volunteer Infantry.

== Properties on the National Register of Historic Places ==
The William Steele House is located on Bethesda-Arno Road, 1/2 mile east of Bethesda. It was built in 1850 and was listed on the U.S. National Register of Historic Places in 1988.

Bethesda is also the location of Smithson-McCall Farm, which was listed on the National Register in 2007.

== Sites ==
The locations in Bethesda include Bethesda Elementary School, Bethesda Market & Deli, and the now closed Bethesda High School building that is adjacent to the elementary school and now serves as a spot for recreational basketball and baseball. The school's old library is also utilized and is the Bethesda Public Library. In April 2022, runaway fugitive couple Casey and Vicky White also passed through Bethesda on their escape and abandoned their car on Banner Adams Road on the outskirts of town.

== Notable people ==
- Ida Horton East (1842–1915), philanthropist

== Gallery ==
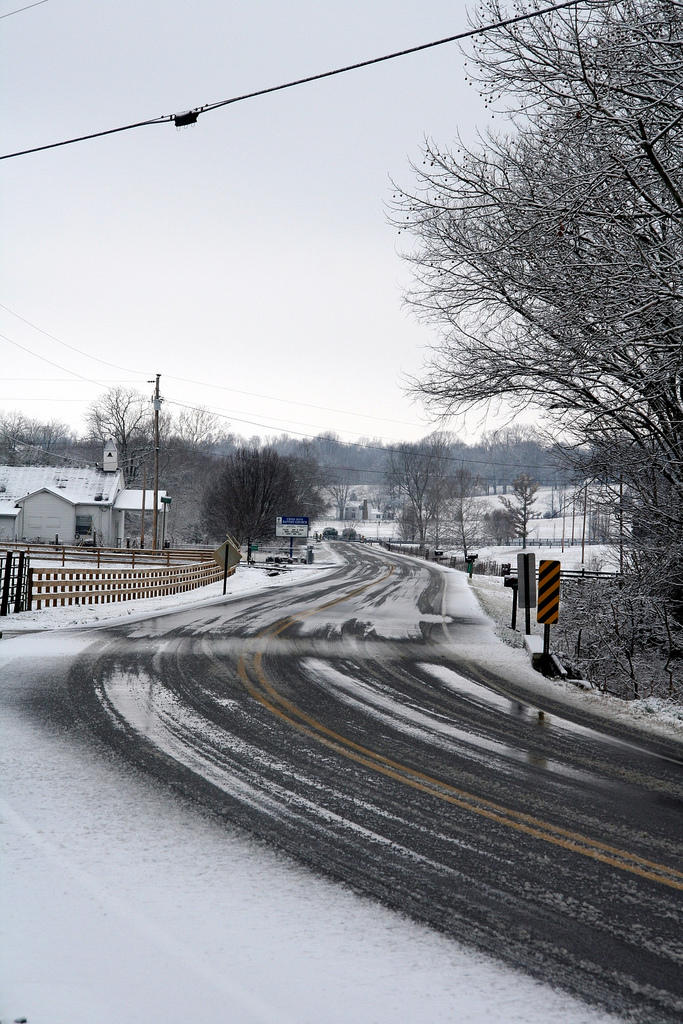
Cross Keys Baptist Church, February 2007.
