= Edward East =

Edward East may refer to:

- Edward Murray East (1879–1938), American plant geneticist and botanist
- Edward H. East (1830–1904), American politician; Secretary of State for Tennessee, 1862–1865
- Sir Edward East, 1st Baronet (1764–1847), English politician and legal writer; chief justice of Calcutta
- Edward East (clockmaker) (1602–1696), English clockmaker
