= Sion Hill, U.S. Virgin Islands =

Sion Hill, United States Virgin Islands
- CDP
- Location within Saint Croix, U.S. Virgin Islands Location within the U.S. Virgin Islands
- Coordinates: 17°44′28″N 64°44′50″W
- Country: United States
- Territory: United States Virgin Islands
- Time zone: UTC-4 (AST)

Sion Hill is a settlement on the island of Saint Croix, in the United States Virgin Islands.

== History ==
The Sion Hill estate, a former sugarcane plantation, was the economic center of the area. The stone Danish colonial era plantation house, windmill base, and sugar processing factory buildings are now in ruins.

The windmill was used to power a sugar mill for crushing the sugar cane harvested on the plantation.

== Sion Hill estate ==
- Sion Hill
- U.S. National Register of Historic Places
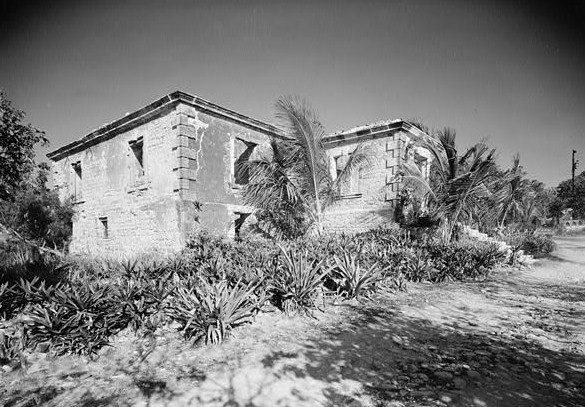
- Nearest city: Christiansted, Virgin Islands
- Area: 10 acres (4.0 ha)
- Built: 1758 (mill); 1765 (house)
- Architectural style: Classical Revival
- NRHP reference No.: 76001850
- Added to NRHP: July 19, 1976

The sugar plantation and rum distillery was established in the 18th century. The estate passed through several owners while it was in operation. The great house, the main residence on the plantation, is a one-story Classical Revival limestone building completed in 1765. The factory and grinding mill, the two primary buildings used for sugar production, were also made of limestone; the distillery is located within the factory building. The property also includes a cookhouse and a stable.

The plantation was added to the National Register of Historic Places on July 19, 1976.

== See also ==
- Sugar production in the Danish West Indies
- Sugar plantations in the Caribbean
