= Ida Horton East =

American philanthropist and social reformer (1842–1915)

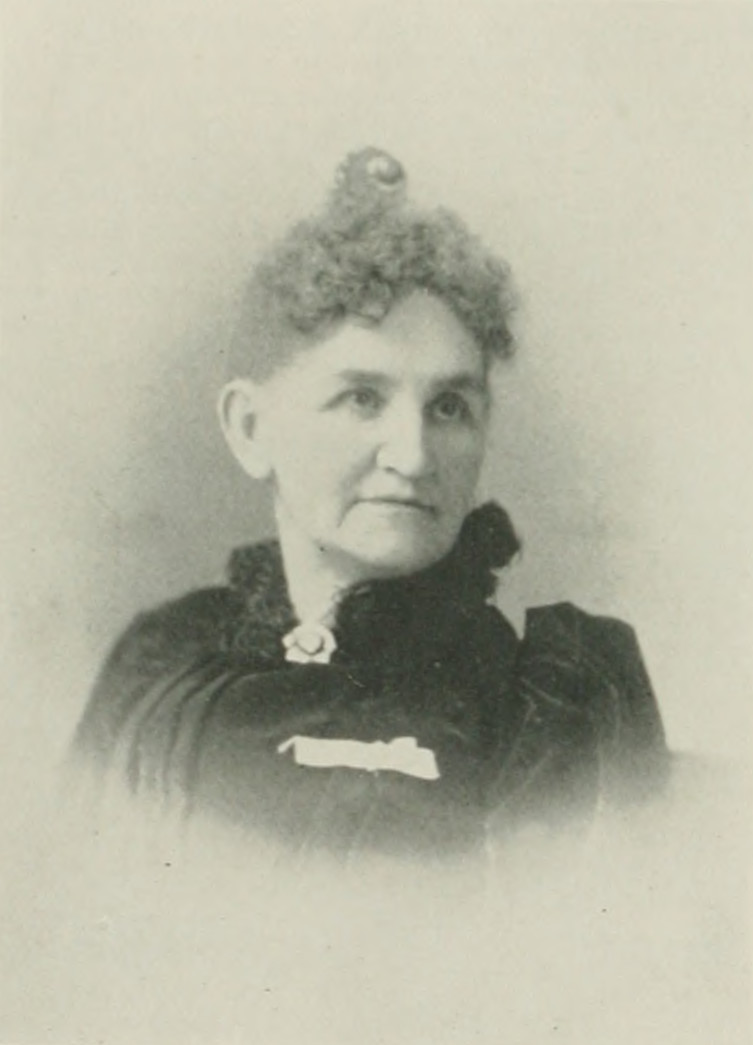
- "A Woman of the Century"
- Born: Ida Tennessee Horton; March 19, 1842; Bethesda, Tennessee, U.S.
- Died: February 4, 1915 (aged 72); Nashville, Tennessee, U.S.
- Other names: Mrs. Edward H. East; "Tennie"
- Occupations: philanthropist; social reformer

Ida Horton East (March 19, 1842–February 4, 1915) was an American philanthropist and social reformer. She was active in the Daughters of the American Revolution (D.A.R.) and the Woman's Christian Temperance Union (W.C.T.U.).

== Early life and education ==
Ida Tennessee (nicknamed "Tennie") Horton was born in Bethesda, Tennessee, March 19, 1842. (Note: According to Willard & Livermore (1893), Ida was born March 15, 1849.) Her father, Rev. Henry Cato Horton of the Methodist Episcopal Church, South, was a Virginian. Her mother, Elizabeth Elliott Kennedy, was a South Carolinian. Her grandparents came from England and Ireland and could boast a coat-of-arms on both sides of the house, but strong republican sentiments forbade a display of them. East was eligible as a Colonial Dame, being the granddaughter of Capt. Thomas Kennedy, of Virginia, who fought in the Revolutionary War under Francis Marion. She was a relative of the Pickneys, and was descended on her maternal side from Capt. Bernard Elliott, who served in the Revolutionary War. East had 12 older siblings: Hilliard, Mary, Martha, Miranda, Elizabeth, Claiborne, Sarah, Susan, Minerva, William, Frances and Fannie.

Her father moved to Mississippi, where East's girlhood was spent. As a young lady, she was popular with the old and young. When the Mississippi and Tennessee Railroad was being built in the 1850s through Mississippi, the work had to stop for lack of financial resources when the road had been extended only 50–60 miles (80–97 km). A plan was suggested to get the men of the county together to raise a fund. A May Queen feast and a barbecue in the woods were chosen. Tennie Horton, as she was called, only fourteen years old, was chosen queen, and she on that occasion made a railroad speech that brought in thousands of dollars.

She was educated in the Marshall Female Institute, in Marshall County, Mississippi, under the management of Pres. Joseph E. Douglas.

== Career ==
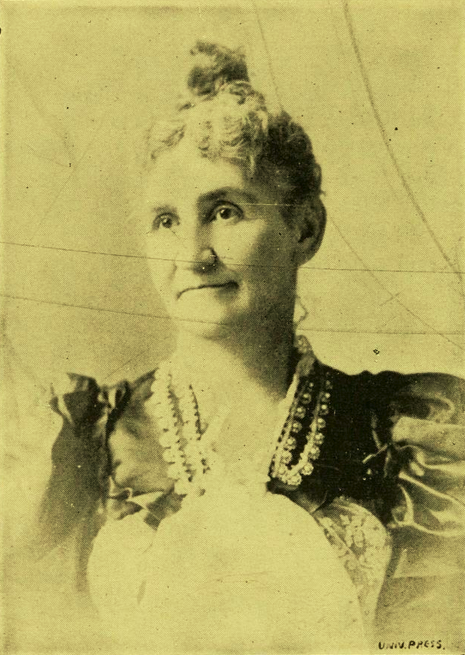
undated

For several years, she was associated with the W.C.T.U. work. For years, she served as the president of the Central W.C.T.U. in Nashville, Tennessee, where she resided for many years, and was also corresponding secretary of the State W.C.T.U. She was appointed State chair of the Southern Woman's Council. She spent much time and money for the cause of temperance. In every reform movement, she took great interest. When the Prohibition amendment was before the people of Tennessee, she was active in the work to create a sentiment in its favor. A large tent, that had been provided in the city in which to conduct gospel services, she had moved to every part of the city for a month, and procured for each night able Prohibition speeches. She was a delegate to every national W.C.T.U. convention since 1887.

At her stately home, she entertained guests of national reputation, and from the same home, the poor were never turned away empty-handed. McTyeire Memorial Church was in existence because of her untiring energies. Possessed of an ample fortune, she was foremost in all movements looking to uplift the less fortunate.

For two years, she taught a night school for young men and boys.

Though she found little time to write, she wrote for several periodicals, was correspondent for newspapers, and prepared a book for publication.

She was appointed Regent of the Cumberland Chapter, the second one of the order of D.A.R. organized in Tennessee. She also held the office of State Vice Regent of the D.A.R.

== Personal life ==
When very young, she married David Crockett Ward—a merchant—who was killed in the Civil War. They had three children: Augustus, Nina and Eila. During the war, she was the only protection of her old parents, with the exception of a few faithful servants who remained with them.

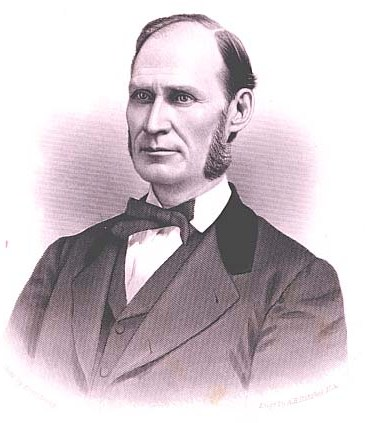
Edward H. East

In 1868, she married Judge Edward H. East, a jurist, who sympathized with and aided her in all her work. Edward briefly served as Tennessee's acting governor during the interim between Andrew Johnson's inauguration as U.S. Vice President on March 4, 1865, and the inauguration of the state's "elected" governor, William G. Brownlow, on April 5, 1865.

In feeble health for two years, but sick only a short time, Ida Horton East died in Nashville on February 4, 1915.

== Selected works ==
=== Poems ===
- "The Nation's Centennial', 1876
