= Capt. Samuel Allison House =

Historic house in New Hampshire, United States

- U.S. National Register of Historic Places
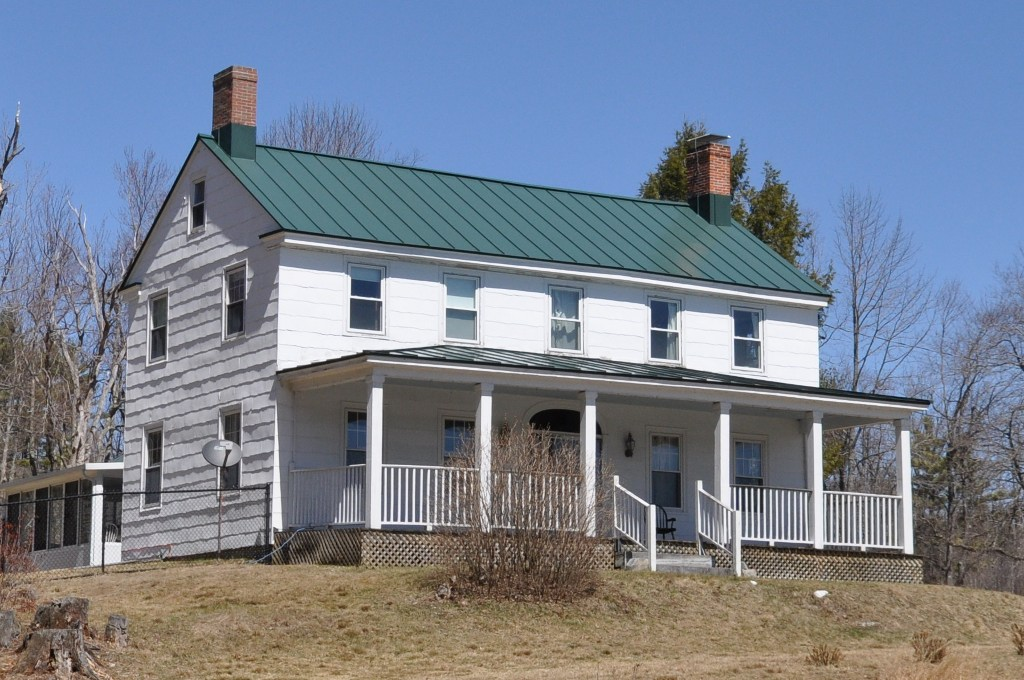

- Location within New Hampshire Location within the United States
- Location: Keene Rd., Dublin, New Hampshire
- Coordinates: 42°54′43″N 72°6′51″W
- Area: 1.8 acres (0.73 ha)
- Built: 1825
- Architectural style: Federal
- MPS: Dublin MRA
- NRHP reference No.: 83004005
- Added to NRHP: December 18, 1983

The Capt. Samuel Allison House is a historic house on New Hampshire Route 101, overlooking Howe Reservoir, in Dublin, New Hampshire. Built about 1825 by a locally prominent mill owner, it is a good local example of Federal style residential architecture. The house was listed on the National Register of Historic Places in 1983.

== Description and history ==
The Captain Samuel Allison House is located on a rural stretch of New Hampshire 101 west of Dublin center, on the north side of the road a short way east of its junction with Charcoal Road. It overlooks a portion of Howe Reservoir located south of the road, and has fine views of Mount Monadnock. It is a 2 1/2-story wood-frame structure, with a side-gable roof, end chimneys, and a clapboarded exterior. Its main facade is five bays wide, with sash windows arranged symmetrically around the main entrance. The entrance features Federal style sidelight windows and a semi-oval transom. A single-story hip-roof porch extends across the front, supported by square posts.

The house was built between 1825 and 1830 by Samuel Allison, a captain in the local militia and later town selectman. Allison established a sawmill nearby in 1830, but sold it in 1848 when he moved to Marlborough. The front porch is a later 19th-century addition. The subsequent house owners also operated the sawmill; one of them was Micah Howe, for whom the reservoir is named. The house is stylistically similar to the Rufus Piper Homestead.

== See also ==
- National Register of Historic Places listings in Cheshire County, New Hampshire
