= Cookhouse =

Small building where cooking takes place

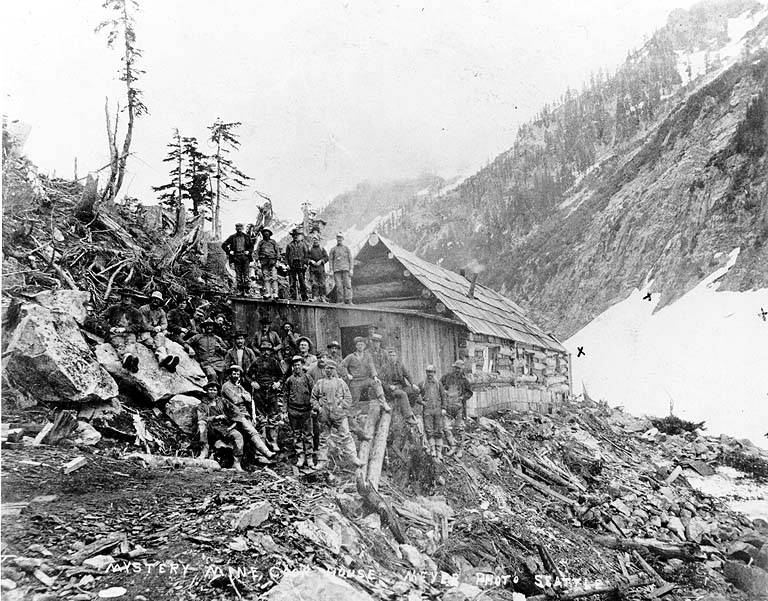
Mystery Mine cookhouse, Monte Cristo, Washington, ca. 1894

A cookhouse is a small building where cooking takes place. Often found at remote work camps, they complemented the bunkhouse and were usually found on ranches that employed cowboys, or loggers in a logging camp. Prior to the 20th century, cookhouses were a feature of some private residences where the kitchen was a separate building so the heat and smoke from cooking was kept away from the main residential building.

== Types of cookhouses ==
In North America, cookhouses were a standard feature of remote work sites, as the working men (e.g. cowboys, loggers, miners, etc.) needed large amounts of food for the strenuous work they performed. In logging camps, cooks were important to the morale of the workers. In some cases, workers would follow a cook to the camp where they were working each season. The cookhouse was one of the key buildings at any work site, along with the bunkhouse and tool shed.

The use of a cookhouse was not limited to resource extraction industries. Travelling circuses also use a style of cookhouse to feed their workers and performers. In the 1930s, the Civilian Conservation Corps worked in many remote areas, like the Malheur National Forest in the Ochoco Mountains of eastern Oregon. The Allison Ranger Station was expanded with two ranger residences, a fire warehouse, a gas house, a garage, a generator shed, and a cookhouse. Large institutions, like Ireland's Sligo Gaol, also had a cookhouse to serve the needs of the institution.

A wannigan was a kitchen built on a raft which followed the log drivers down the river, both serving meals and providing tents and blankets for the night if no better accommodations were available.

=== Residential usage ===
In the Southern United States, antebellum plantations, like the Archibald Smith Plantation or the Sion Hill estate, had a cookhouse separate from the main house to keep the main house from overheating. An example is the Condit Family house in New Jersey which had an unattached cookhouse.

In Iran, a common feature in homes prior to the 20th century was to have a cookhouse separate from the residence. With time and newer technologies this has changed with the kitchen being brought into the house.

=== Military usage ===
A military version of the cookhouse is the galley, the compartment of a ship, train, or aircraft where food is cooked and prepared for consumption in the mess. In the Eastern Cape province of South Africa, 170 kilometres (110 mi) north of Port Elizabeth, the town of Cookhouse may have gotten its name from a small stone house used for shelter and cooking by troops camping on the bank of the Great Fish River.

== Gallery ==
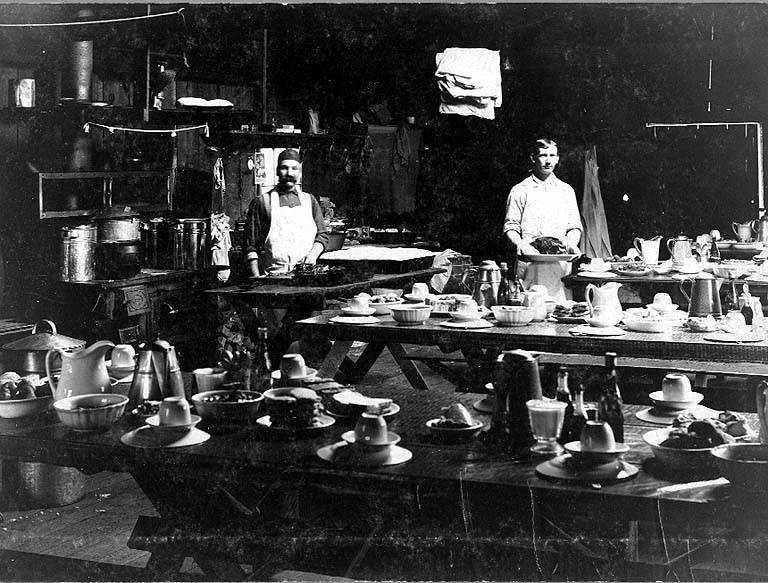
Cookhouse interior, unidentified logging camp, Pacific Northwest, circa 1900

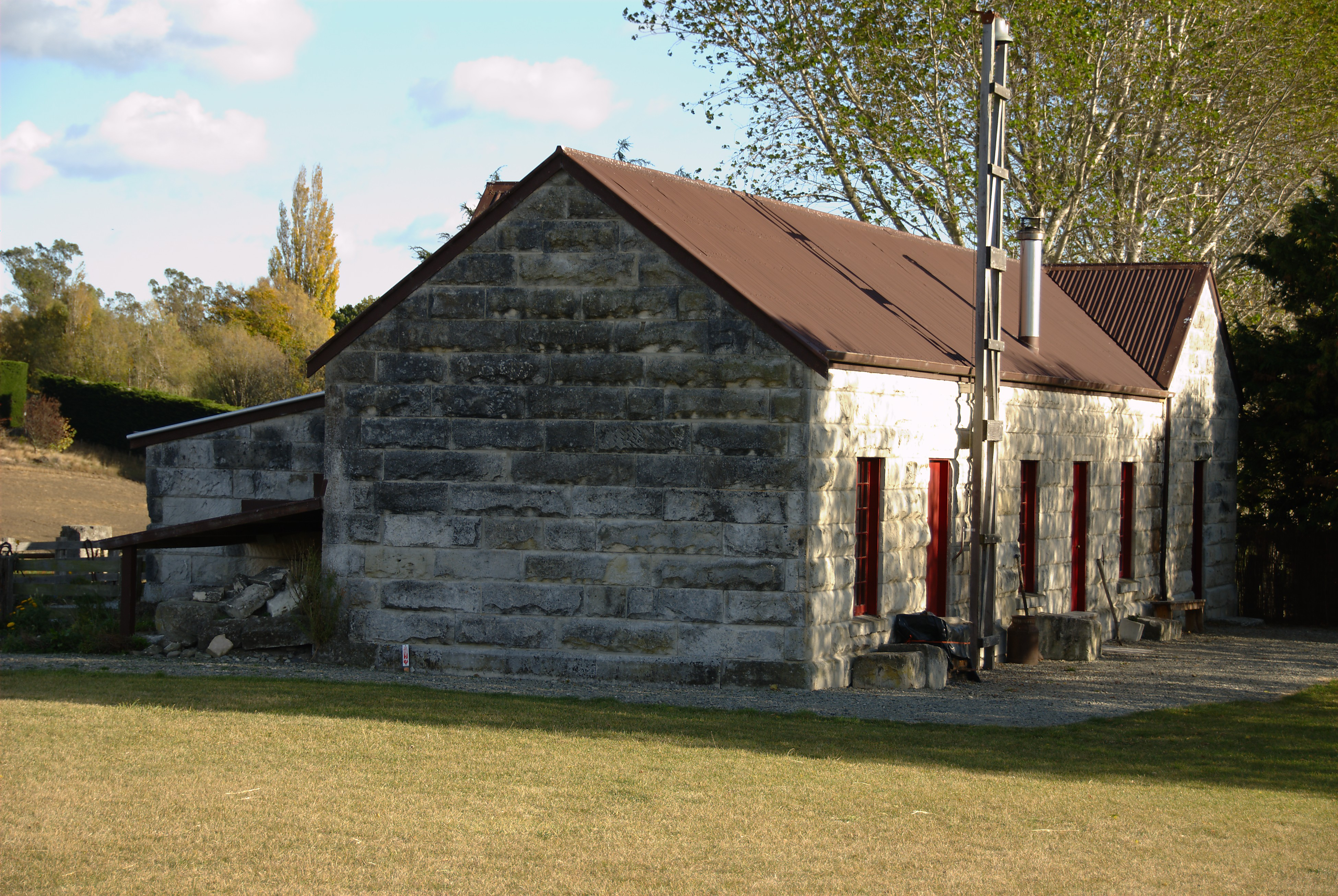
Men's quarters and cookhouse at Totara Estate

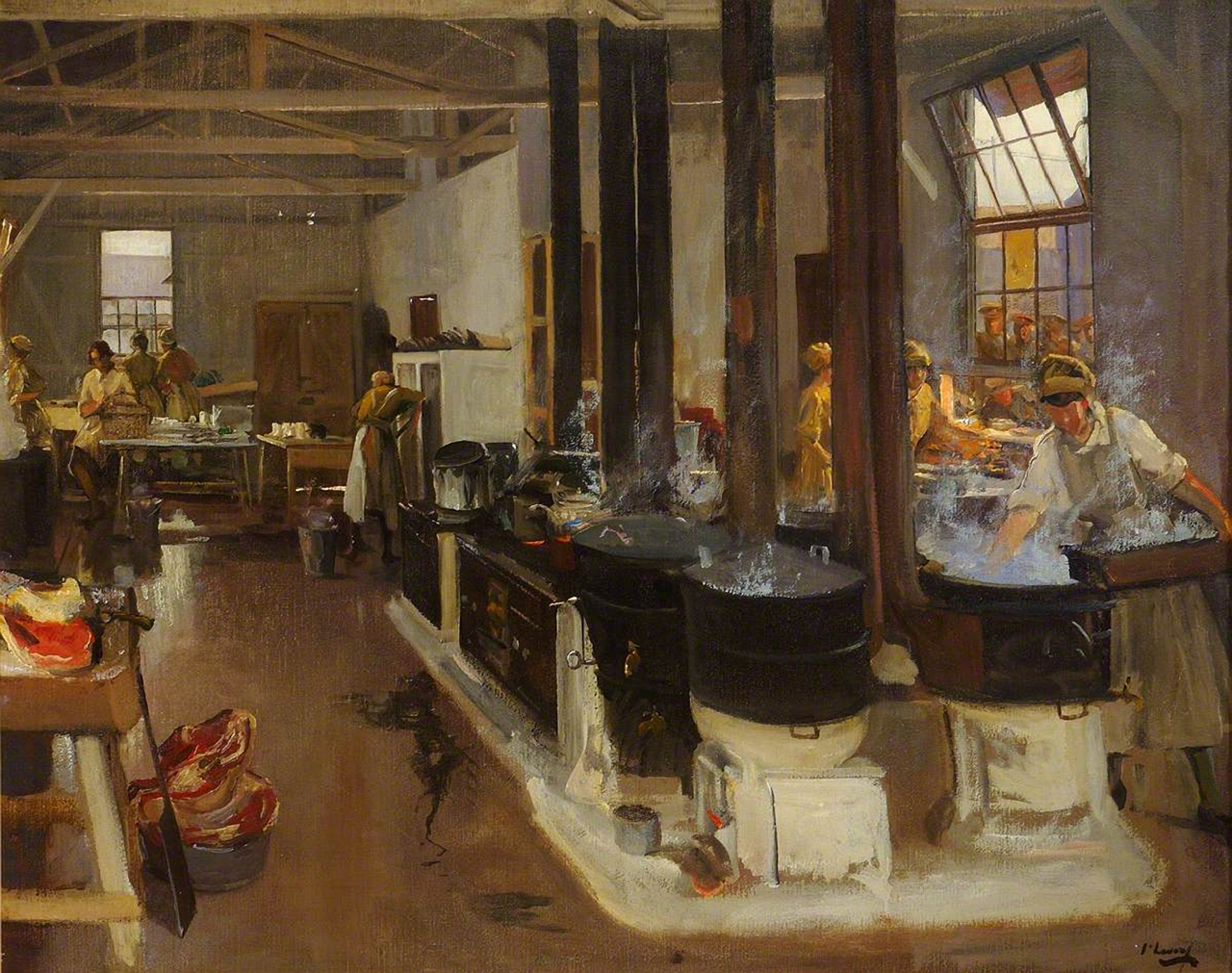
The Ordnance Chief Officer's Cookhouse, Henriville, Boulogne, circa 1917

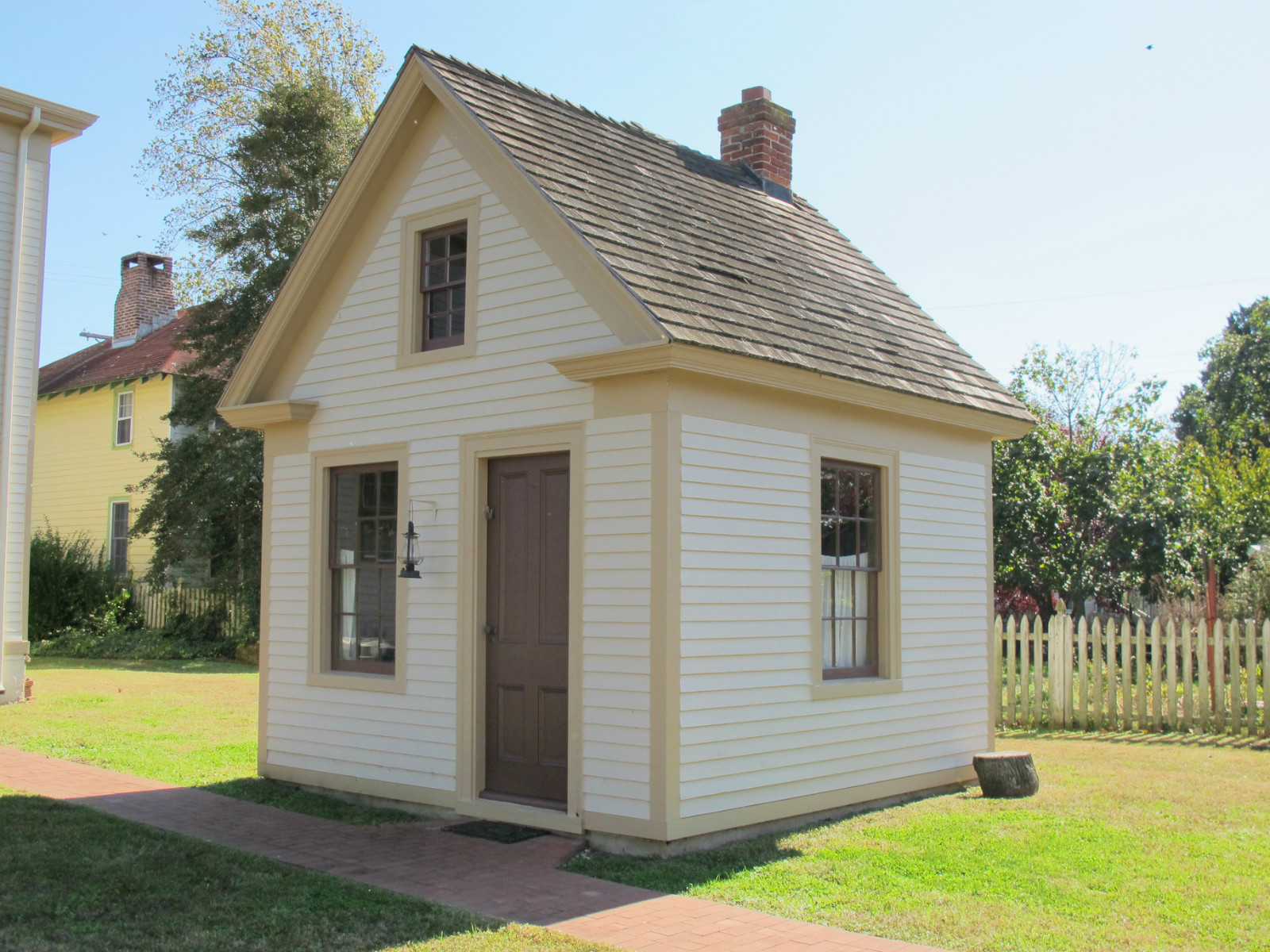
Reconstructed cookhouse at the Captain Edward Compton House

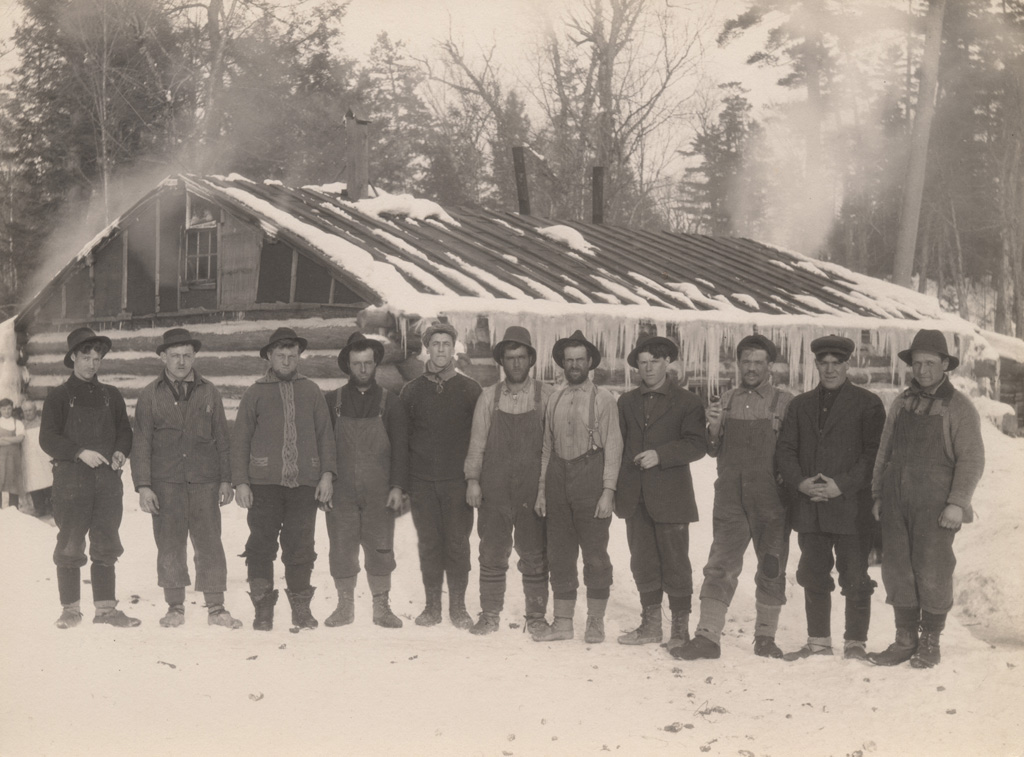
Canadian lumberjacks in 1917, photo by Reuben Sallows

== See also ==
- Chuckwagon
- Field kitchen
- Montana's Cookhouse
- Samoa Cookhouse
- Crew car, Troop kitchen
