= Side passage plan architecture =

Architectural style

Side passage plan architecture is an architectural style. The Spencer Buford House and the Dr. Urban Owen House are historic houses in Tennessee that are examples of this style.

== See also ==
- Central passage plan architecture.
