= Smithson–McCall Farm =

Historic house in Tennessee, United States

- U.S. National Register of Historic Places
- U.S. Historic district
- Location within Tennessee Location within the United States
- Location: 6779 Comstock Rd., Bethesda, Tennessee
- Coordinates: 35°44′43.18″N 86°47′13.39″W
- Area: 256.3 acres (103.7 ha)
- Built: c. 1830, c. 1860, c. 1920, c. 1940
- Architectural style: Colonial Revival, "Hall and parlor architecture"
- MPS: Historic Family Farms in Middle Tennessee MPS
- NRHP reference No.: 07000158
- Added to NRHP: March 15, 2007

Smithson–McCall Farm is a 256.3-acre (103.7 ha) historic district in Bethesda, Tennessee. The farm was listed under the National Register of Historic Places in 2007. The listing claims that the property "documents the impact of the progressive agricultural movement of the early twentieth century on the operations and landscape of a middle-class family farm," and includes an "architecturally significant group of buildings and structures, placed within an agricultural landscape of high integrity...that represents a good example of farmstead architecture in Middle Tennessee and that reflects the impact of the Progressive Farm movement of the early twentieth century".

The property has also been known as Smithson-Fisher Farm, Happy Hills Farm, WM. 1043, Fisher Farm, and Bag End Farm throughout its history.

The farmhouse was constructed c. 1830 and changed significantly c. 1860 and c. 1920. Additional farm structures were added during c.1920-c.1940, including a dairy barn, a dairy silo, a well house, a burley tobacco barn, a water trough, a garage, a smokehouse and a chicken coop. The property includes four ponds. It includes Colonial Revival and "Hall and parlor" architecture and other styles. When listed, the district included seven contributing buildings, six contributing structures, and one contributing site.

The listing is described in its NRHP nomination document.

The property was covered in a study of Historic Family Farms in Middle Tennessee MPS.

As "Fisher Farm", it is listed as a Tennessee Century Farm. It continues as a working farm, raising sheep.

== Additional sources ==
- Shelton-Lonas, Bobbie Sue. "A Step Back in Time, Flat Creek" (PDF). Eagleville, Tennessee History.
- Ennis C Wallace Sr; Jo Ann Petty; Marjorie Redmond; Martha Ann Hazelwood (1986). Flat Creek Its Land and Its People (Williamson County, Tennessee). Woodward & Stinson Printing Company.
- "Smithson-McCall Farm, National Register of Historic Places Application" (PDF).
