= Dr. Urban Owen House =

Historic house in Tennessee, United States

- U.S. National Register of Historic Places
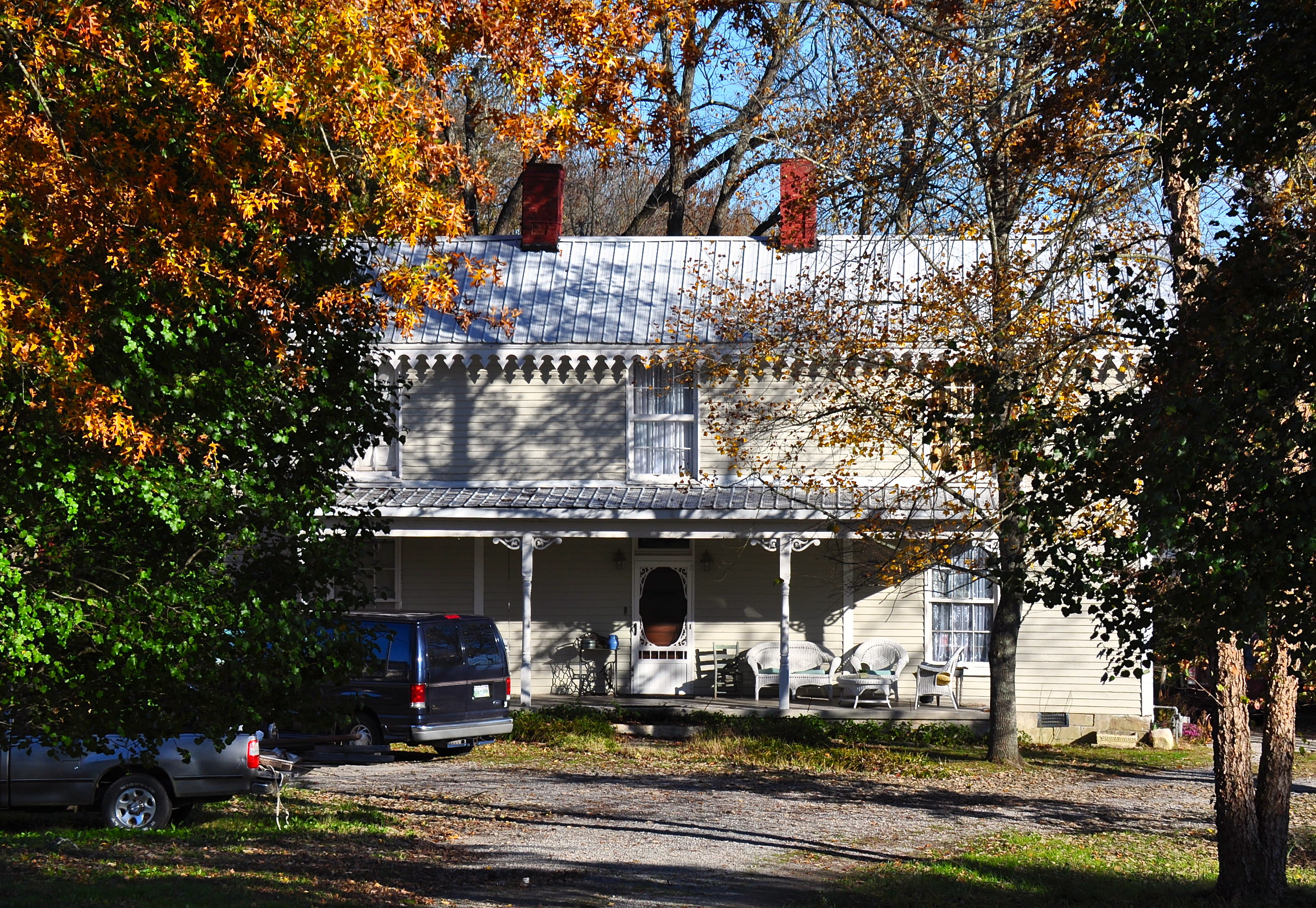
- Dr. Urban Owen House in November 2013.

- Location within Tennessee Location within the United States
- Location: US Alt. 31, College Grove, Tennessee
- Coordinates: 35.7856°N 86.6760°W
- Area: 2.2 acres (0.89 ha)
- Built: 1873
- Architectural style: Stick/Eastlake, Side passage plan
- MPS: Williamson County MRA
- NRHP reference No.: 88000326
- Added to NRHP: April 13, 1988

The Dr. Urban Owen House is a property in College Grove, Tennessee that was listed on the National Register of Historic Places in 1988. When listed the property included one contributing building and one non-contributing structure on an area of 2.2 acres (0.89 ha).

According to a 1988 study of Williamson County historical resources, the house is a "good example" of a "house with vernacular designs with fine Eastlake and Queen Anne decoration" and associated with a prominent resident of Williamson County.
