= The Bank of College Grove =

- U.S. National Register of Historic Places
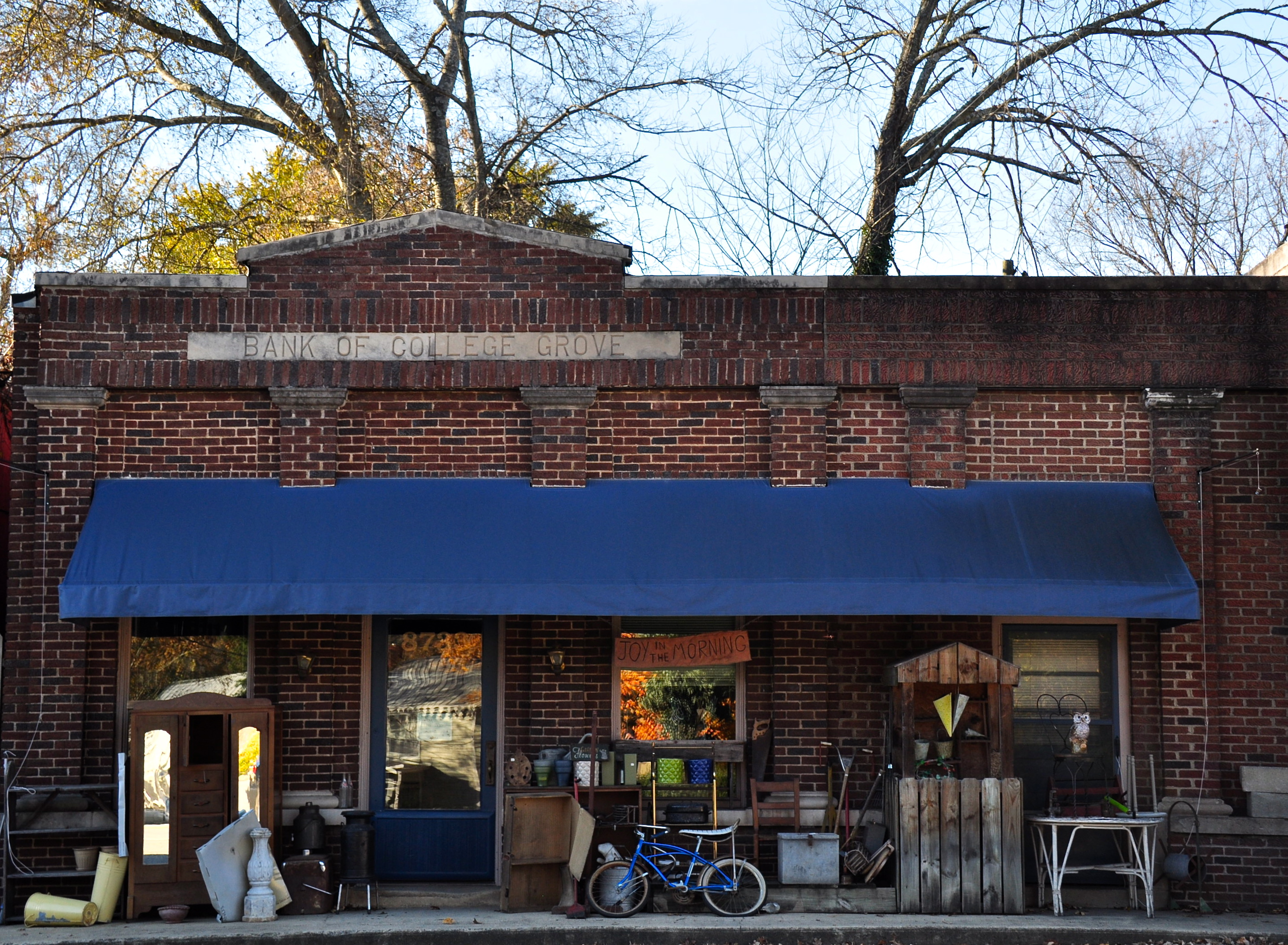
- The Bank of College Grove in November 2013

- Location within Tennessee Location within the United States
- Location: US Alt. 31, College Grove, Tennessee
- Coordinates: 35°47′10″N 86°40′35″W
- Area: less than 1 acre (0.40 ha)
- Built: 1911, 1927
- MPS: Williamson County MRA
- NRHP reference No.: 88000289
- Added to NRHP: April 13, 1988

The Bank of College Grove in College Grove, Tennessee, opened in a frame building in 1911, and the building was significantly remodelled in 1927, with the exterior gaining a brick veneer and Doric pilasters. The building was listed on the National Register of Historic Places in 1988.

The bank had assets of $27,000 at the end of its first year, and was a successful venture for the next two decades. Unlike several other Williamson County banks in rural areas, such as Bank of Nolensville, Thompson Station Bank, and a bank at Leiper's Fork, the College Grove bank then survived the Great Depression, and continued in operation at this location until 1965, when it moved to a building next door.

The property was listed on the National Register as part of a 1988 study of Williamson County historical resources.
