= Parks Place =

Historic house in Tennessee, United States

- U.S. National Register of Historic Places
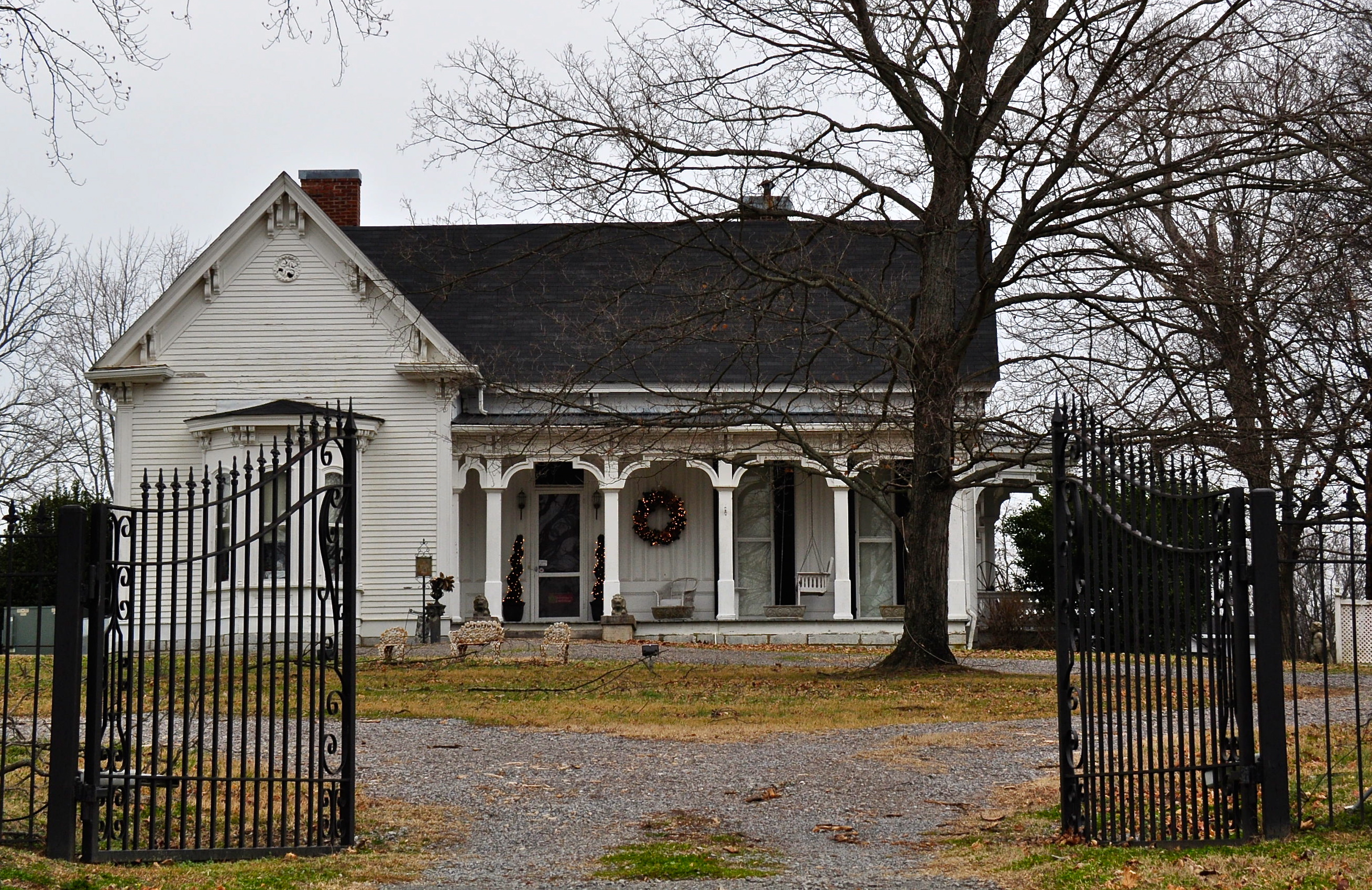
- Parks Place, December 2013.

- Location within Tennessee Location within the United States
- Location: Cox Rd., College Grove, Tennessee
- Coordinates: 35°48′53″N 86°40′11″W
- Area: 4.5 acres (1.8 ha)
- Built: c.1864 and c.1872
- Architectural style: Italianate
- NRHP reference No.: 84003753
- Added to NRHP: September 27, 1984

Parks Place is an Italianate-style house in College Grove, Tennessee that was listed on the National Register of Historic Places in 1984. It has also been known as the William Felix Webb House. It was built between 1864 and 1872 for William Felix Webb, a businessman. Webb sold the house in 1888 to Joseph T. Demumbrane. It was sold in 1910 with 352 remaining acres to Arthur R. Parks, who occupied it until the 1940s.

When listed in 1984 the property included three contributing buildings and three non-contributing buildings on an area of 4.5 acres (1.8 ha).
