= Spencer Buford House =

Historic house in Tennessee, United States

- Formerly listed on the U.S. National Register of Historic Places
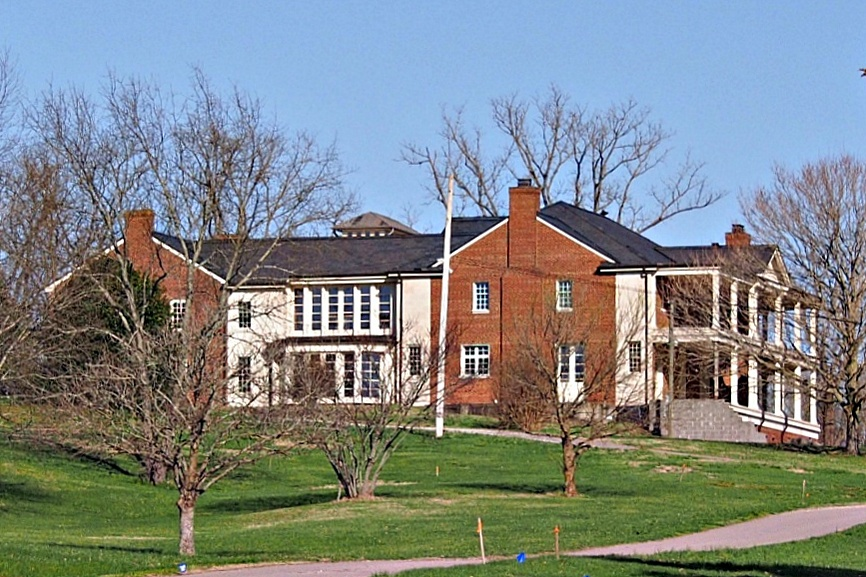
- Spencer Buford House in 2015

- Location within Tennessee Location within the United States
- Location: US 31 1/2 mi. S of Critz Ln., Thompsons Station, Tennessee
- Coordinates: 35°48′32″N 86°53′50″W
- Area: 6.4 acres (2.6 ha)
- Built: c. 1820
- Architectural style: Federal, Side passage plan
- MPS: Williamson County MRA
- NRHP reference No.: 88000346

Significant dates
- Added to NRHP: April 13, 1988
- Removed from NRHP: November 19, 2015

The Spencer Buford House is a property in Thompsons Station, Tennessee, United States, that was listed on the National Register of Historic Places in 1988. The main house was built about 1813. The property is also known as Roderick, in honor of the horse Roderick, a favorite horse of Confederate cavalry and irregular forces Nathan Bedford Forrest.

It was a two-story brick side Side passage plan farmhouse built c.1820. It is unusual in Williamson County for the side passage plan. Its "doorway displays excellent Federal detailing." It was built of bricks made by slaves in kiln on the farm.

Besides the house the property included one non-contributing building. The listing was for an area of 6.4 acres (2.6 ha).

The property was covered in a 1988 study of Williamson County historical resources.

In November 2015 the house was evaluated as having lost its historic integrity, because it had been altered with "unsympathetic" additions that subsumed much of the original house, and yet lost the interior details in the original portion retained.

It was removed from the National Register in 2015.
