= Allison Guard Station =

- Allison Ranger Station
- U.S. National Register of Historic Places
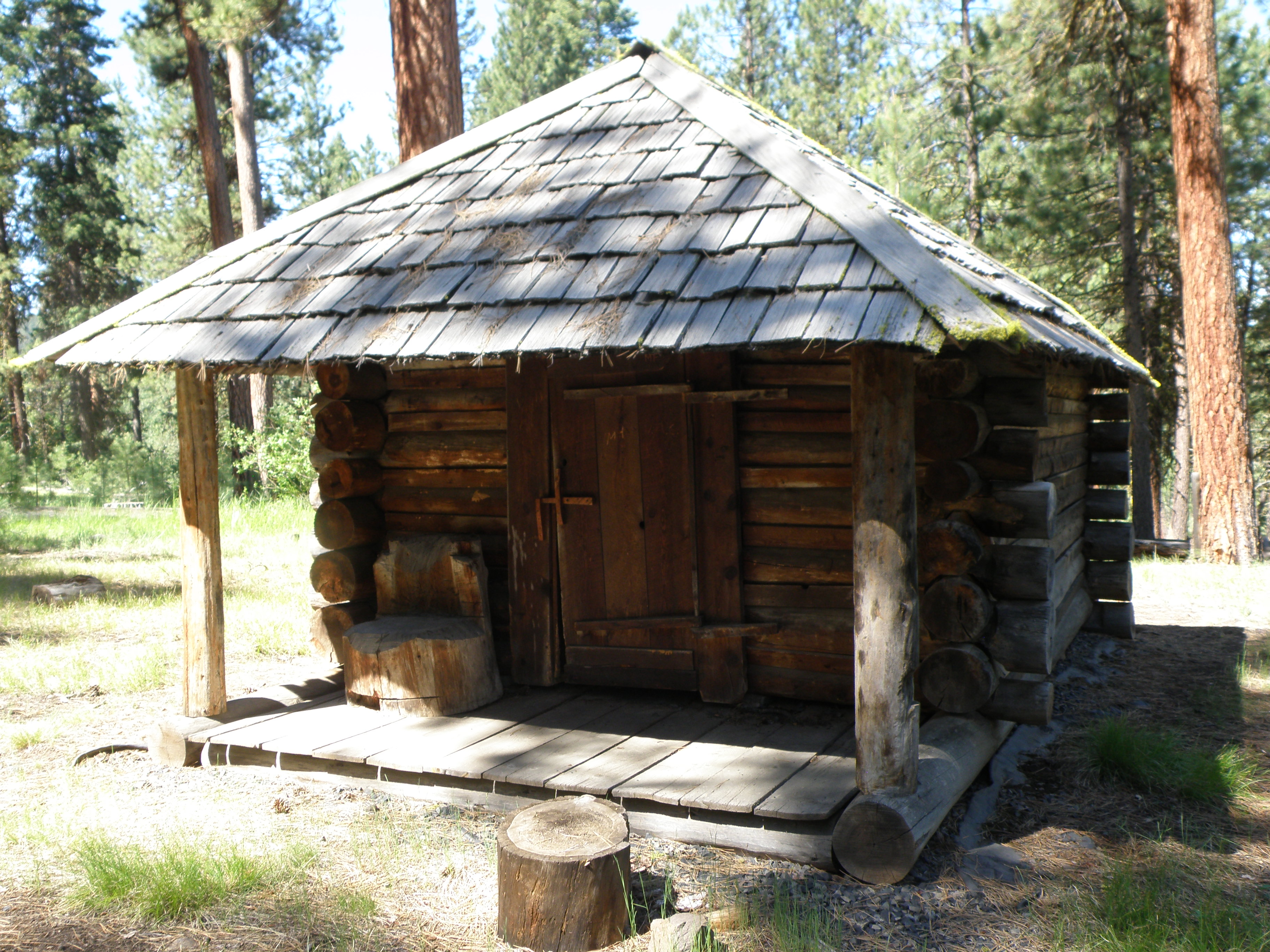
- The Donnelly Cabin at the Allison Guard Station
- Location: Malheur National Forest
- Nearest city: Burns, Oregon, USA
- Coordinates: 43°55′14″N 119°35′23″W
- Built: 1911
- Architect: E. W. Donnelly
- Architectural style: Simple rustic
- NRHP reference No.: 80003314
- Added to NRHP: September 12, 1980

The Allison Guard Station is a Forest Service compound consisting of eight rustic buildings located in the Malheur National Forest in the Ochoco Mountains of eastern Oregon. It was originally built as a district ranger station for the Snow Mountain Ranger District. It was later converted to a summer guard station. Today, it is an active Forest Service guard station with a crew of twelve fire fighters on station during the summer fire season. The station's oldest building, the Donnelly Cabin, is currently listed on the National Register of Historic Places as the "Allison Ranger Station". Most of the other buildings at the Allison Guard Station are eligible for historic designation, but are not yet listed on the National Register.

== History ==
In the early 20th century, the forest road networks were not well developed. To facilitate work in National Forests, the Forest Service built district ranger stations at strategic locations within the forest to house full-time employees and provide logistics support to fire patrols and project crews working at remote forest sites. After World War II, the Forest Service greatly expanded its road network, allowing employees to get to most forest areas within a few hours. As a result, many of the more isolated ranger stations were closed or converted to summer guard stations.

The Snow Mountain Ranger District was established as an administrative sub-division on the Ochoco National Forest which was separated from the Deschutes National Forest in 1911. The original Forest Service ranger's cabin at Allison Creek was built in 1911 by E. W. "Cy" Donnelly, the first ranger of the Snow Mountain District. A second residence cabin and several outbuildings were added to the compound around 1925. There is no written record of when these additional buildings were constructed; however, the 1925-era buildings are shown in a few historic photographs. The 1925-era buildings were removed sometime before the mid-1930s. In 1935, the Civilian Conservation Corps constructed seven additional building at the ranger station.

The ranger station served as the administrative headquarters for the Snow Mountain Ranger District from 1911 until the 1950s when the district headquarters was moved to Hines, Oregon. At that time, the Allison compound was converted to a guard station for fire crews and work parties. The site is one of the few ranger stations that have been in continuous use for almost a century. In 1993, volunteers renovated the Donnelly Cabin. The project replaced the roof. Decayed sill logs and floor joists were also replaced. The project stabilized the foundation on a gravel pad and reset the cabin's porch posts.

The Snow Mountain Ranger District was transferred from the Ochoco National Forest to the Malheur National Forest and incorporated the Emigrant Creek Ranger District around 2003. In 2005, the Malheur Nation Forest supervisor approved a project to renovate several of the Civilian Conservation Corps buildings. The project replaced deteriorating foundations, converted the warehouse into a fire crew bunkhouse, and improved the ranger station's water system which included drilling a new well. During the project, the Forest Service was careful to preserve the historic character of the buildings. As a result, the Civilian Conservation Corps era structures remain eligible for listing on the National Register of Historic Places sometime in the future. A modern vehicle shed was also constructed as part of the 2005 project; however, the structure was designed to match the historic buildings at the site. Today, the bunkhouse and ranger residences are used during the summer to house a twelve-person fire fighting crew, and the Forest Service rents the Civilian Conservation Corps era cookhouse to recreational visitors.

The Donnelly Cabin and six of the seven Civilian Conservation Corps era buildings still exist at the Allison site. Because of its unique historic value as an early Forest Service ranger station, the Donnelly Cabin was listed on the National Register of Historic Place in 1980. While the Donnelly Cabin is only one of the guard station's buildings, the historic site covers 10 acres (40,000 m^{2}) and is officially listed as the "Allison Ranger Station". A Forest Service study in the early 1980s determined that the Civilian Conservation Corps era building at the site are also eligible for historic designation; however, they are not yet listed on the national register.

== Structures ==
The Donnelly Cabin was built in 1911. It is a one-room log cabin. The logs that make up the cabin's main structure are peeled pine. The cabin has a wood-frame floor, and the roof is covered by hand-cut larch shingles. It has an overhanging front porch held up by two log posts. The cabin is located approximately 200 yards north of the other ranger station buildings.

In 1935, the Civilian Conservation Corps built two ranger residences, a fire warehouse, a gas house, a garage, a generator shed, and a cookhouse at the Allison Ranger Station. All of the buildings are wood-frame structures. One residence is an 884-square-foot (82.1 m^{2}) structure; the other is only 499 square feet (46.4 m^{2}). The 2,450-square-foot (228 m^{2}) warehouse was converted into a bunkhouse in 2005. The 608-square-foot (56.5 m^{2}) gas house and the 216-square-foot (20.1 m^{2}) garage are used for storage. The small, 60-square-foot (5.6 m^{2}) generator house was demolished in 2005.

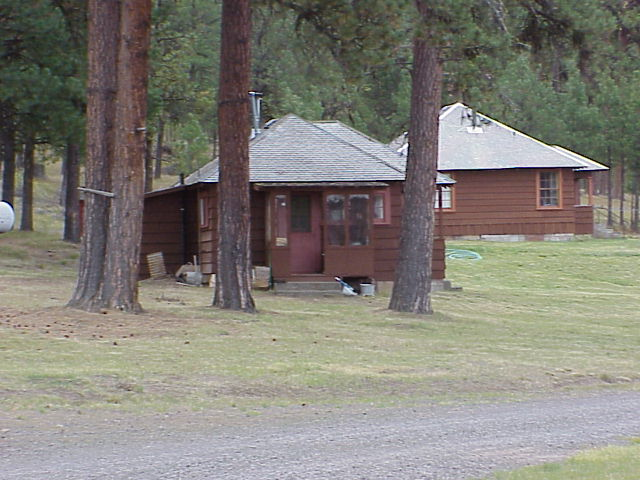
* Ranger residences

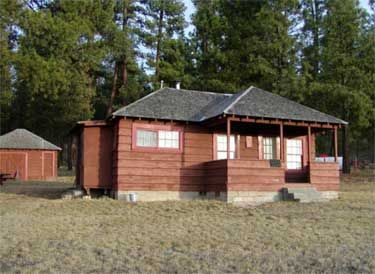
* Small residence

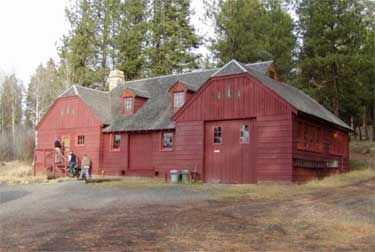
* Warehouse/bunkhouse

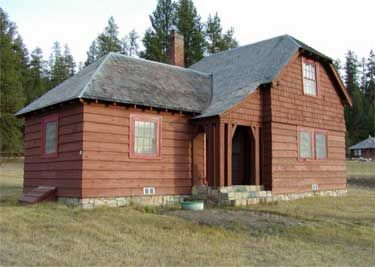
* Cookhouse rental

The 954-square-foot (88.6 m^{2}) cookhouse was renovated in 2005. It is now available to the public from late May until early October as a recreation rental unit. The cookhouse has a living room, two bedrooms, a kitchen, and an indoor bathroom with a shower. The living room and bedrooms are furnished. The kitchen is equipped with a refrigerator, a propane cooking stove, and basic cooking and serving utensils. Cleaning supplies are also provided. There is drinking water available from the taps as well as hot water in the kitchen and bathroom. The building has electric lights. The facility sleeps up to eight people. Visitors need to bring food, sleeping bags, personal gear, and trash bags.

== Location ==
The Allison Guard Station is located in a remote area of the Ochoco Mountains in the Malheur National Forest. It is approximately 60 miles (97 km) northwest of Burns, Oregon. The elevation at the site is 5,310 feet (1,620 m). The forest around the guard station is dominated by ponderosa pine.

To get to the Allison Ranger Station from Burns, travel south on Highway 20 four miles (6 km) though the neighboring town of Hines. Approximately one mile south of Hines, turn onto Forest Road 47, and follow the road northwest 18 miles (29 km) to the junction with Forest Road 41. Turn left onto Forest Road 41 and follow that road for approximately 40 miles (64 km) past Delintment Lake to the Allison Guard Station.
