= Bostick Female Academy =

- U.S. National Register of Historic Places
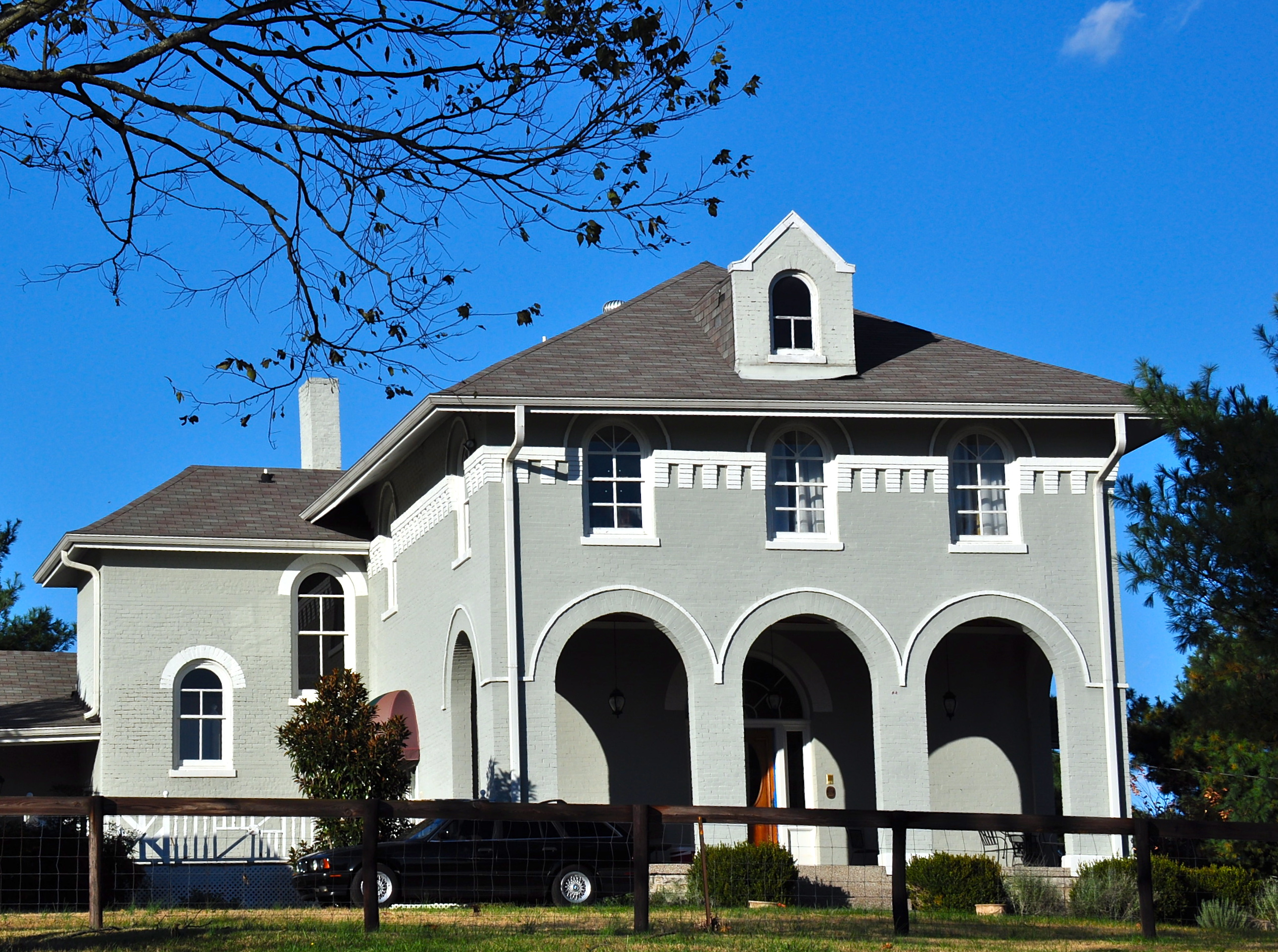
- Bostick Female Academy in November 2013.

- Location within Tennessee Location within the United States
- Location: Hwy. 41 A, College Grove, Tennessee
- Coordinates: 35°51′10″N 86°39′36″W
- Area: 2 acres (0.81 ha)
- Built: c. 1892
- Architectural style: Late Victorian
- NRHP reference No.: 82004070
- Added to NRHP: April 15, 1982

The Bostick Female Academy, also known as Triune School, is a property in Triune, Tennessee that was listed on the National Register of Historic Places in 1982.

At one time Triune had five private schools, including a Porter Female Academy that was destroyed in 1863 in the American Civil War. On the board of the Porter Female Academy was a Dr. Jonathan Bostick, a planter who later bequeathed funds to establish a female academy in Tennessee. This was to replace the Porter Academy. Following delays due to litigation of Bostick's will, the Bostick Female Academy was built and opened in 1892.

The school building was designed in a Late Victorian style of architecture. The listing was for an area of 2 acres (0.81 ha) with just one contributing building.

The building is an L-shaped building built in c.1892.

The building operated as a private school until about 1900, then as a public school until 1957. Since then it has been used as a private home.
