= Solomon Piper Farm =

Historic house in New Hampshire, United States

- U.S. National Register of Historic Places
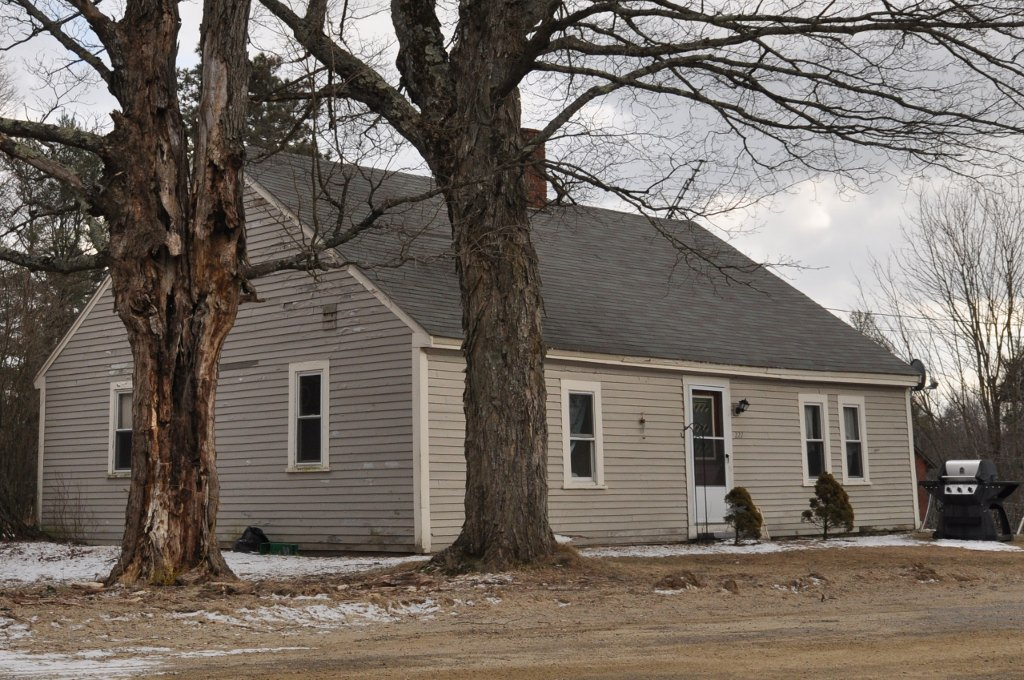

- Location within New Hampshire Location within the United States
- Location: Valley Rd., Dublin, New Hampshire
- Coordinates: 42°52′22″N 72°0′5″W
- Area: 1.6 acres (0.65 ha)
- Built: 1794
- Built by: Piper, Solomon
- Architectural style: Cape, Colonial
- MPS: Dublin MRA
- NRHP reference No.: 83004067
- Added to NRHP: December 18, 1983

The Solomon Piper Farm is a historic farmhouse at 227 Valley Road in Dublin, New Hampshire. Built about 1794, it is a good example of an early Cape style farmstead. The house was listed on the National Register of Historic Places in 1983. The home of Solomon Piper's son, the Rufus Piper Homestead, also still stands and is also listed on the National Register of Historic Places.

== Description and history ==
The Solomon Piper Farm is located in southeastern Dublin, in a rural setting on the east side of Valley Road near its junction with Perry Pasture Road. It is a 1 1/2-story wood-frame structure, with a gabled roof, clapboarded exterior, and central chimney. It is five bays wide, with narrow windows, and a small extension added to the east end. Interior details which have been retained include wainscoting, chair rails, and fireplace mantels.

The house was built about 1794 by Solomon Piper, who purchased a large parcel of land in 1793 from one of Dublin's original proprietors. He was the progenitor of the locally prominent Piper family, his descendants including a great many public servants, as well as local merchants and doctors. The farm remained in the hands of his descendants until the 1850s, when it was sold to Charles Perry whose father Ivory owned a nearby farm. Perry sold the farm to Charles Pickford in 1902. The farmhouse has been relatively little altered, the most notable change being the replacement of its original large chimney with a smaller one.

== See also ==
- National Register of Historic Places listings in Cheshire County, New Hampshire
