= William Steele House =

Historic house in Tennessee, United States

- U.S. National Register of Historic Places
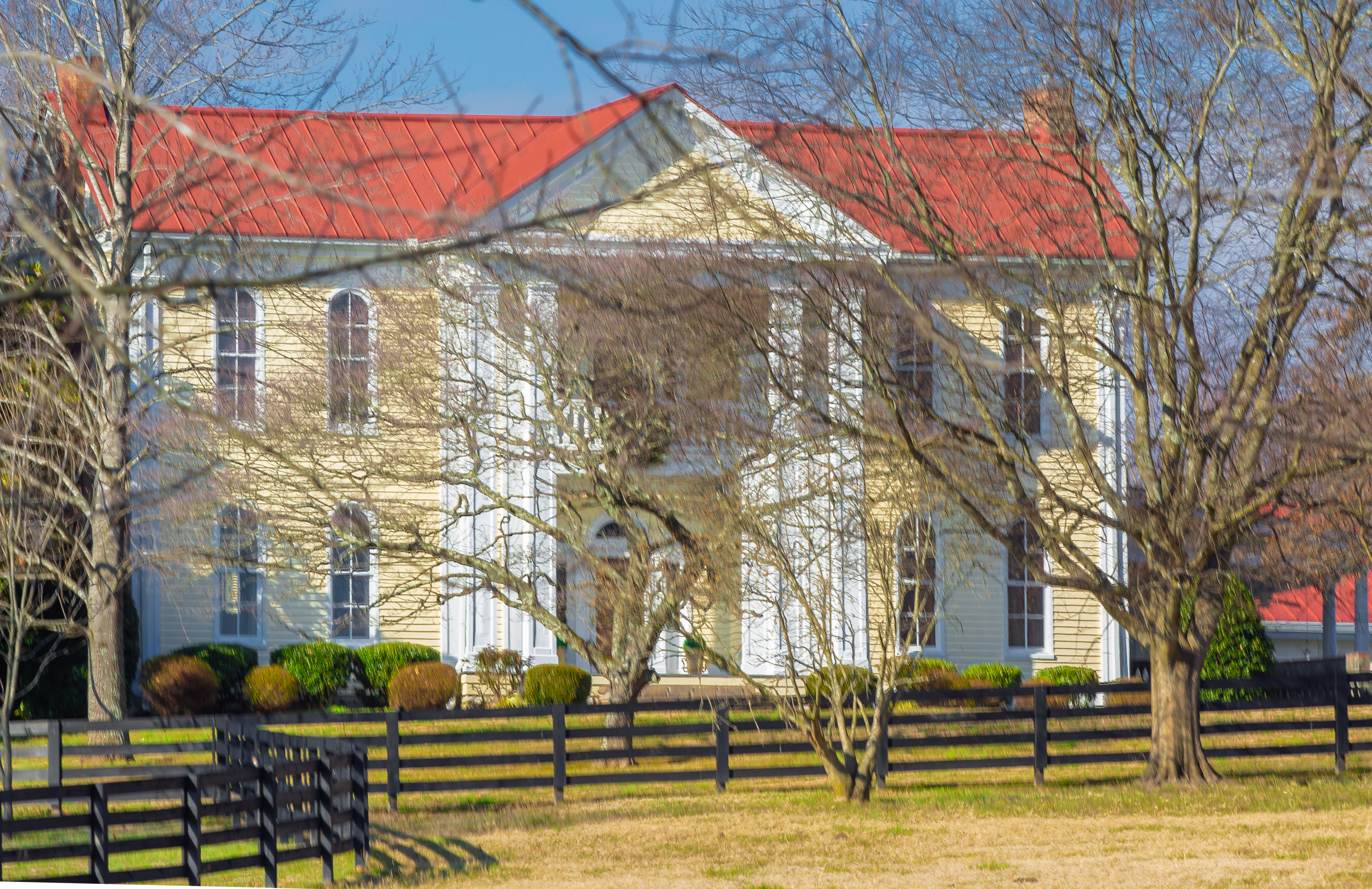
- William Steele House

- Location within Tennessee Location within the United States
- Location: Bethesda-Arno Rd. 1/2 mi. E of Bethesda, Franklin, Tennessee
- Coordinates: 35°46′04.5″N 86°47′15.6″W
- Area: 5.5 acres (2.2 ha)
- Built: c. 1850, c. 1855 and c. 1890
- Architectural style: Greek Revival, Central passage plan
- MPS: Williamson County MRA
- NRHP reference No.: 88000356
- Added to NRHP: April 13, 1988

The William Steele House is a property in Franklin, Tennessee, United States, that was listed on the National Register of Historic Places in 1988. It dates from c.1850. It includes Central passage plan and other architecture. When listed the property included three contributing buildings and three contributing structures on an area of 5.5 acres (2.2 ha). The NRHP eligibility of the property was covered in a 1988 study of Williamson County historical resources.

== William Alexander Steele ==
William Alexander Steele was born in 1827 and was the son of William Steele who had settled in the Bethesda area in the early 1800s. Steele married his cousin Mary Elizabeth Steele in 1850 and constructed the main section of this house circa 1855. During the Civil War Steele served in the Fourth Tennessee Cavalry and was nearly caught by Union soldiers while visiting his home. Upon Steele's death in 1874 the house remained in the possession of his widow who lived until 1911.
