= Allison Dormitory =

- U.S. National Register of Historic Places
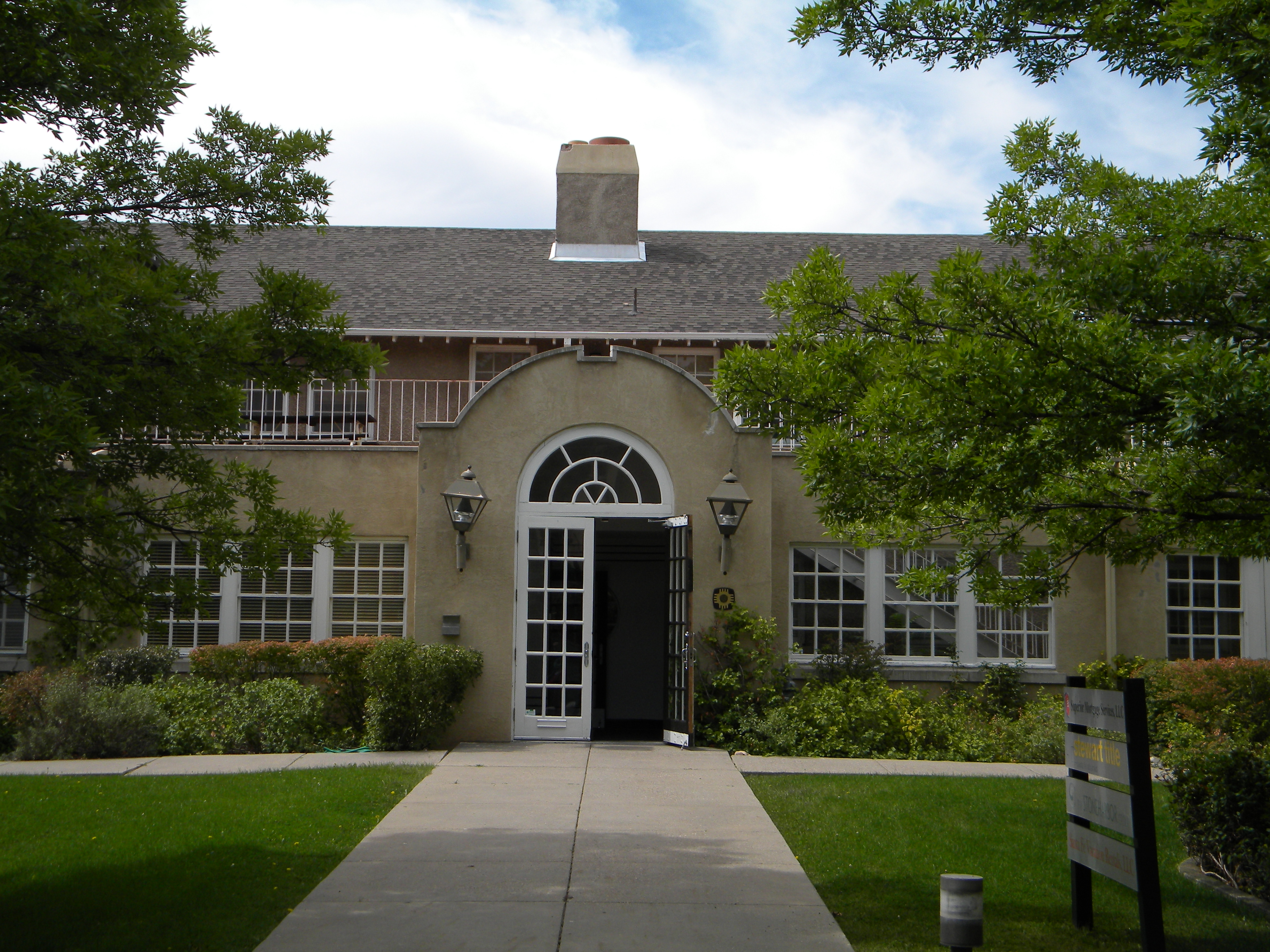

- Location within New Mexico
- Location: 433 Paseo de Peralta, Santa Fe, New Mexico
- Coordinates: 35°41′34″N 105°56′11″W
- Area: 3 acres (1.2 ha)
- Built: 1930
- Architect: A.G. Lamont
- Architectural style: Mission/spanish Revival
- NRHP reference No.: 84000431
- Added to NRHP: November 29, 1984

The Allison Dormitory, at 433 Paseo de Peralta in Santa Fe, New Mexico, was built in 1930. It was listed on the National Register of Historic Places in 1984.

It is significant as the last surviving building of the Allison Mission School, a significant institution in the introduction of Presbyterian and other Protestant faiths to the area. The mission became a boarding school in 1908.

The building has also been known as the Allison-James School Dormitory and Dining Hall Building.
