= Rufus Piper Homestead =

Historic house in New Hampshire, United States

- U.S. National Register of Historic Places
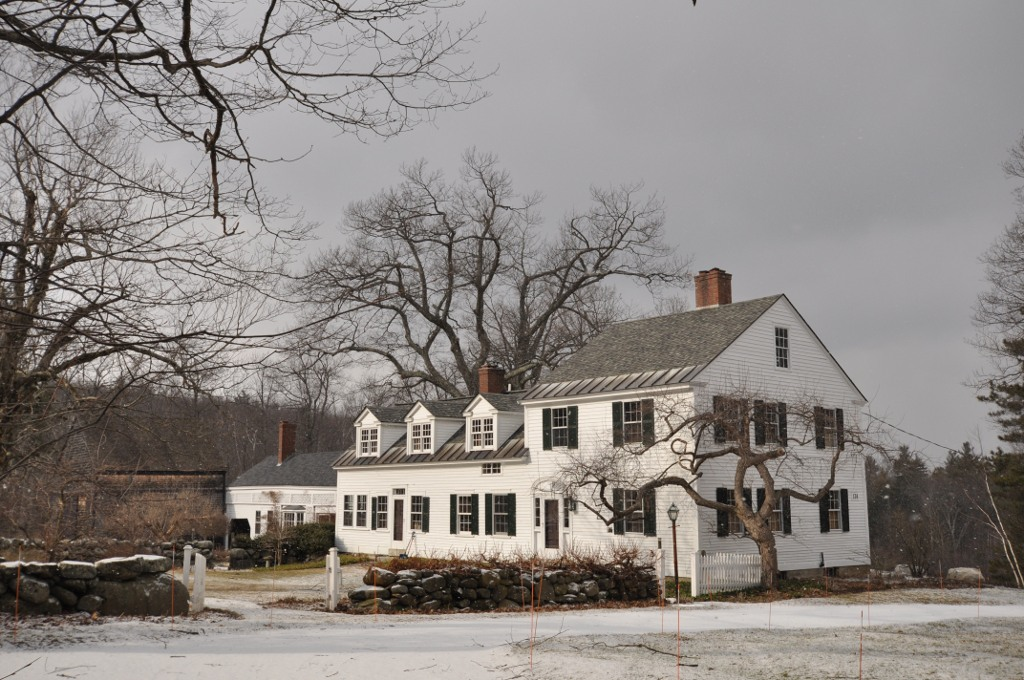

- Location within New Hampshire Location within the United States
- Location: Pierce Rd., Dublin, New Hampshire
- Coordinates: 42°52′22″N 72°0′5″W
- Area: 1.5 acres (0.61 ha)
- Built: 1817
- Architectural style: Colonial Revival, Cape Colonial
- MPS: Dublin MRA
- NRHP reference No.: 83004065
- Added to NRHP: December 15, 1983

The Rufus Piper Homestead is a historic house on Pierce Road in Dublin, New Hampshire. The house is a well-preserved typical New England multi-section farmhouse, joining a main house block to a barn. The oldest portion of the house is one of the 1 1/2-story ells, a Cape style house which was built c. 1817 by Rufus Piper, who was active in town affairs for many years. The house was listed on the National Register of Historic Places in 1983. The home of Rufus Piper's father, the Solomon Piper Farm, also still stands and is also listed on the National Register of Historic Places.

== Description and history ==
The Rufus Piper Homestead is located in a rural setting southeast of Dublin village, on the west side of Pierce Road, about one-quarter mile north of Windmill Hill Road. It is a rambling four-section wood-frame structure, oriented perpendicular to the road. Its main block is a 2 1/2-story gable-roofed block, presenting three window bays and the gable end to the street, and a two-bay facade to the south. The entry is in the left bay, flanked by sidelight windows and topped by a Federal style half-round fan. The second section is 1 1/2 stories in height, with a five-bay facade and three gabled dormers. It has what is now a secondary entrance at the center, topped by a four-light transom window. The third section is also 1 1/2 stories, but is set at an offset to the first two blocks, and connects them to the barn.

The oldest portion of the house is the first ell, built about 1817 by Rufus Piper. Piper was a state representative and town moderator for many years. Piper expanded the house in 1832, adding the main block, but sold the property in 1837. The property was, around the turn of the 20th century, part of Louis Cabot's (of Cabot stain fame) extensive summer estate. It was owned later in the 20th century by William Pierce, inventor of a precision miniature ball bearing and husband to artist Mary de Forest Brush, daughter of George de Forest Brush, another Dublin resident.

== See also ==
- National Register of Historic Places listings in Cheshire County, New Hampshire
