= College Grove Methodist Church =

Historic church in Tennessee, United States

- U.S. National Register of Historic Places
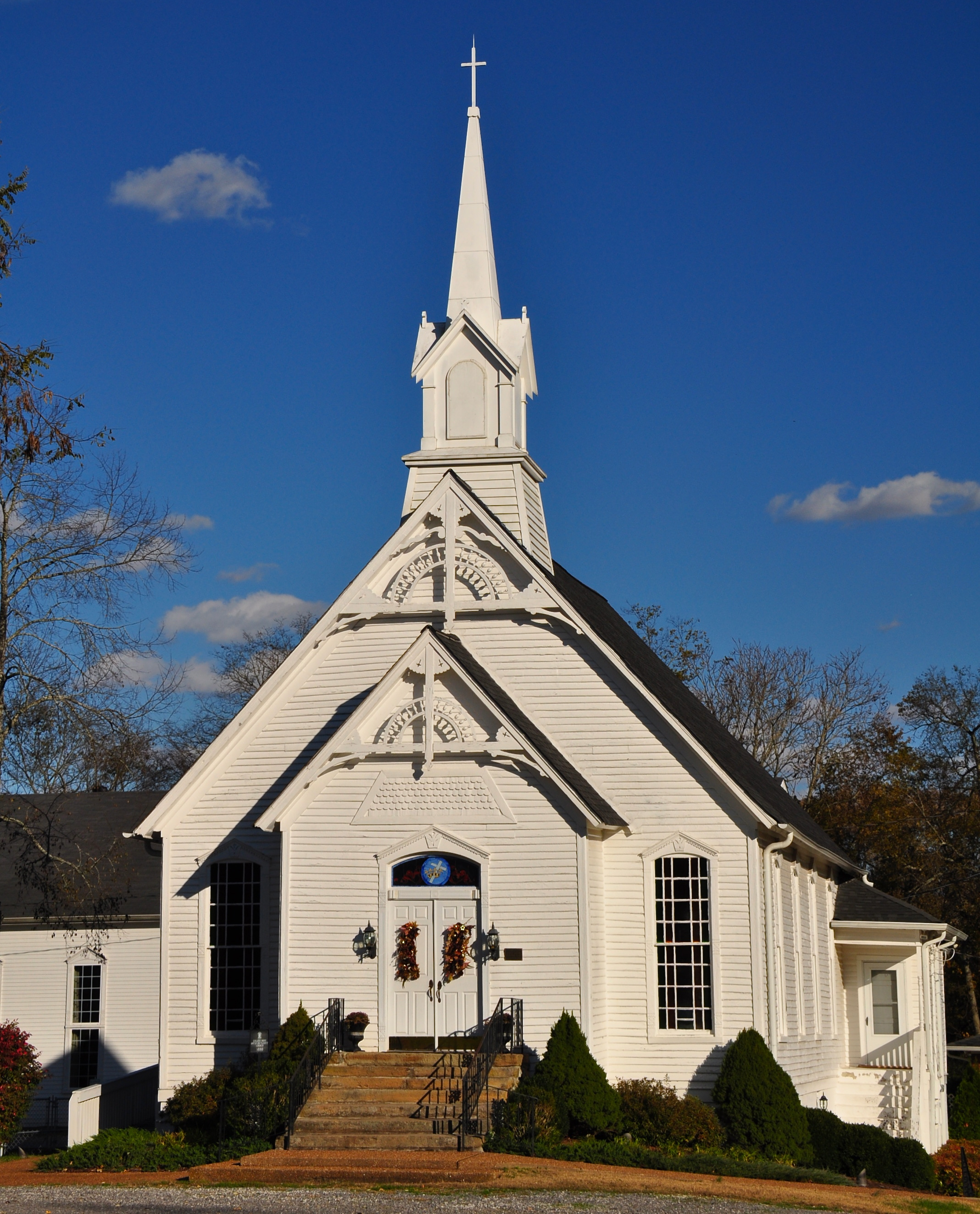
- College Grove Methodist Church in November 2013.

- Location within Tennessee Location within the United States
- Location: US Alt. 31, College Grove, Tennessee
- Coordinates: 35°47′16″N 86°40′25″W
- Area: 2.8 acres (1.1 ha)
- Built: c.1888
- Architect: Slate, T.G.
- Architectural style: Stick/Eastlake
- MPS: Williamson County MRA
- NRHP reference No.: 88000345
- Added to NRHP: April 13, 1988

The College Grove Methodist Church is a building in College Grove, Tennessee that was listed on the National Register of Historic Places in 1988. It was built c.1888 and was designed and/or built by T.G. Slate.

The church is one of the "best examples", along with the Trinity United Methodist Church on Wilson Pike, of more elaborate historic churches built in Williamson County.

It includes Stick/Eastlake architecture. The listing was for an area of 2.8 acres (1.1 ha) with just one contributing building.
