= George Allison House =

Historic house in Florida, United States

- U.S. National Register of Historic Places
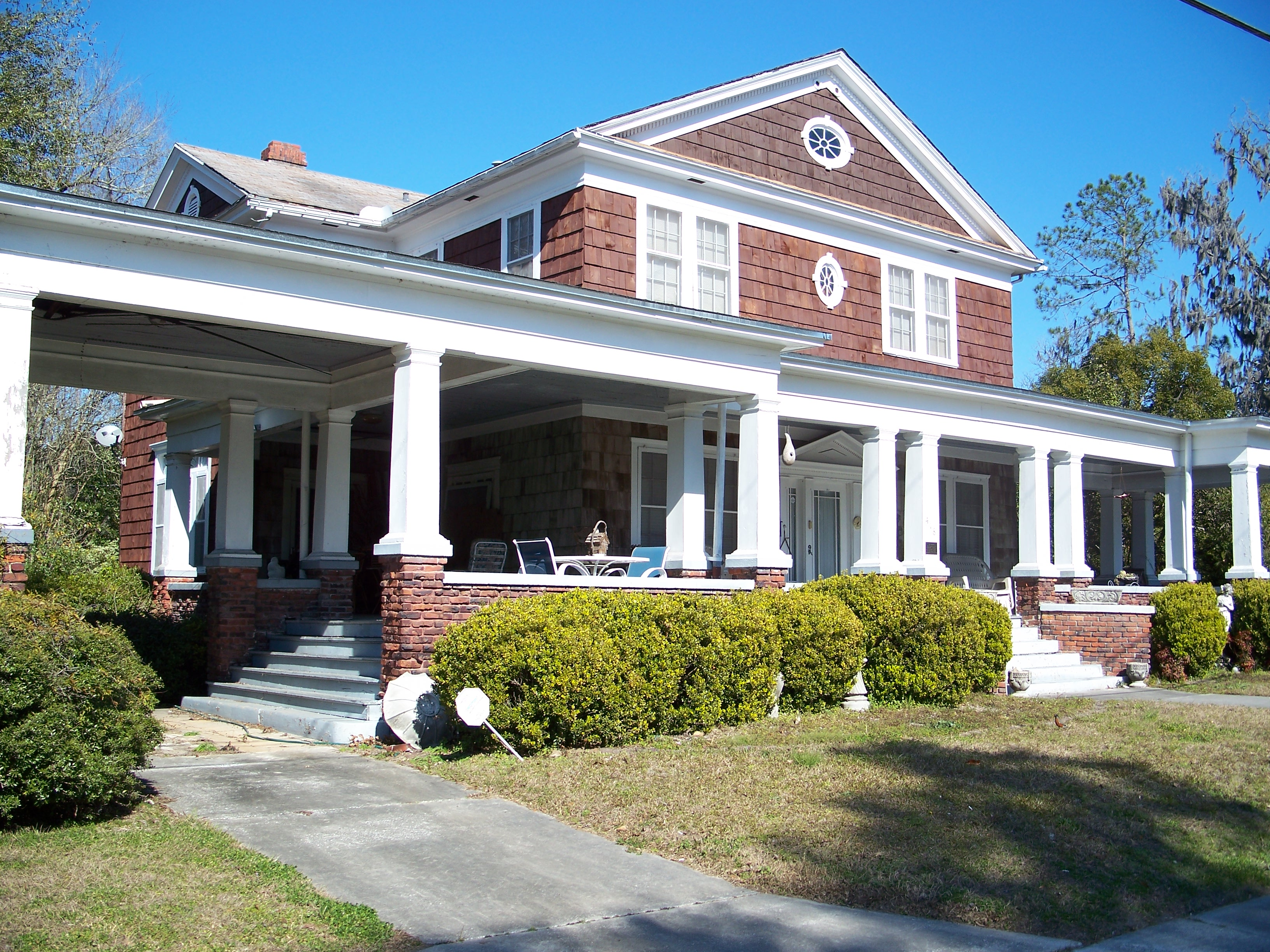

- Location within Florida Location within the United States
- Location: 418 West Duval Street, Live Oak, Florida
- Coordinates: 30°18′1″N 82°59′19″W
- Area: 1 acre (0.40 ha)
- Architectural style: Colonial Revival
- NRHP reference No.: 95000369
- Added to NRHP: April 20, 1995

The George F. Allison House is a historic house located at 418 West Duval Street in Live Oak, Florida, United States. It was the home of George F. Allison, a Live Oak businessman during the city's early commercial years, and is an example of Colonial Revival architecture in the area.

== Description and history ==
The construction date and builder of the house are not known; the house is shown on a 1903 Sanborn Insurance map. The large, two-story, Colonial Revival style house was remodeled in 1927 after 40% of the rear was damaged by a fire on New Years Day. On April 20, 1995, it was added to the U.S. National Register of Historic Places.

== Gallery ==
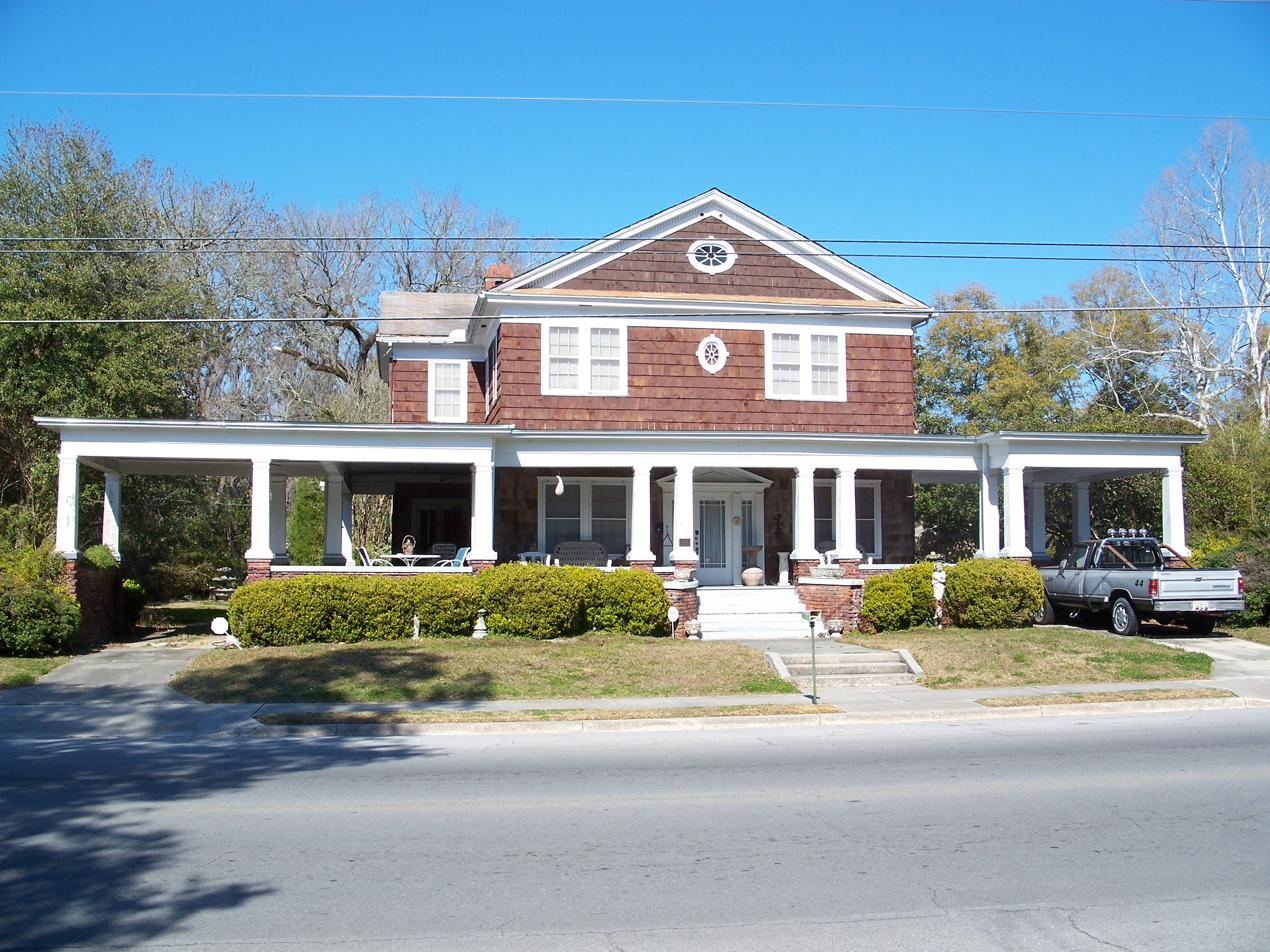

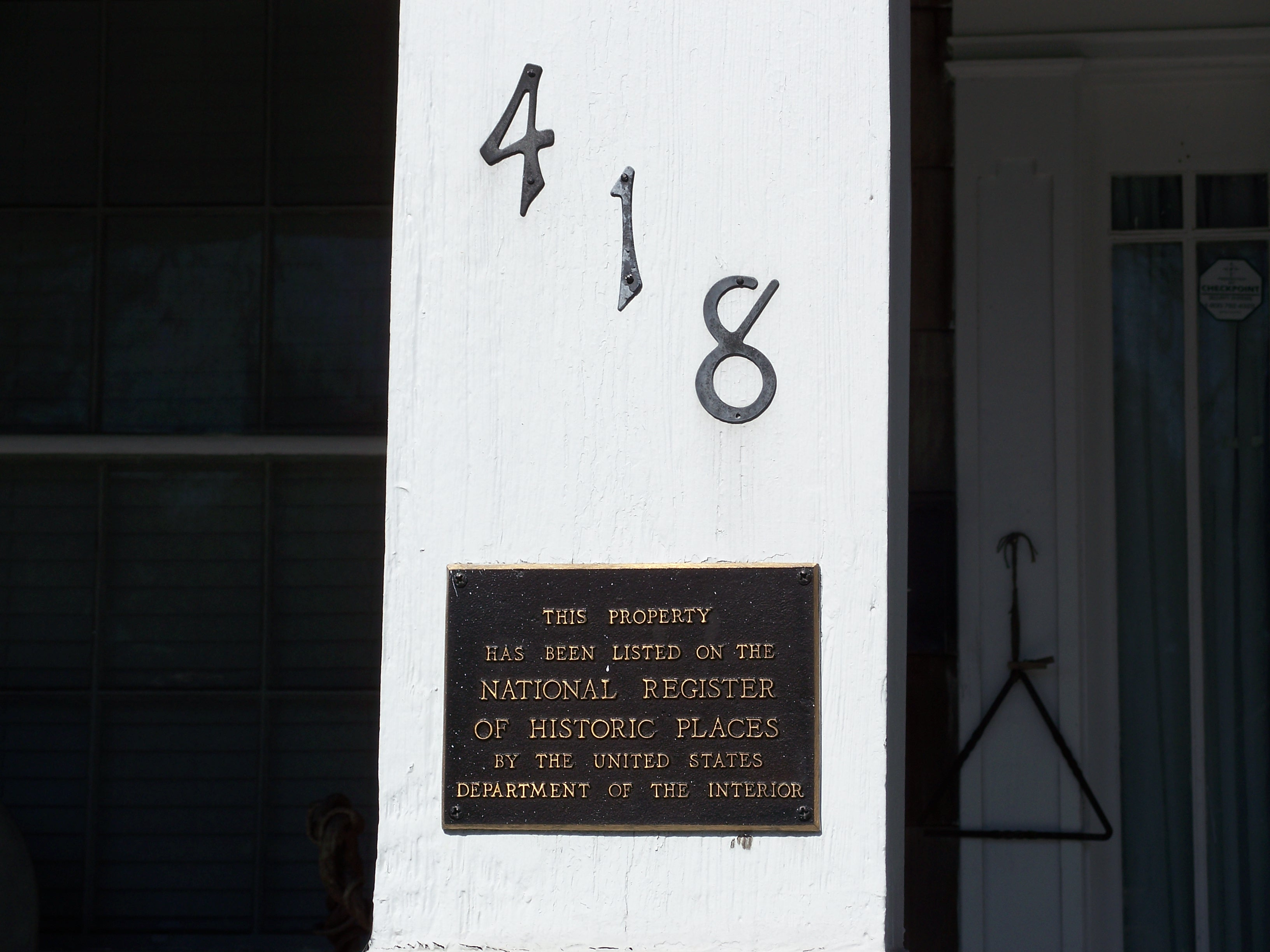
Historical marker
