= Edward H. East =

American politician (1830–1904)

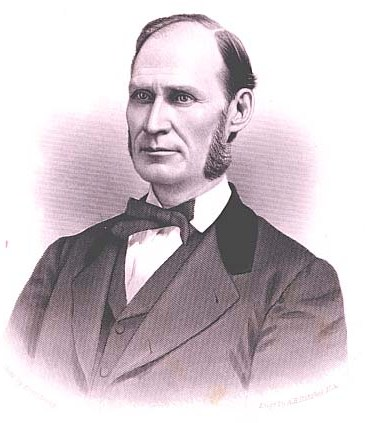

Acting governor of Tennessee
- In office March 4, 1865 – April 5, 1865
- Preceded by: Andrew Johnson (Military)
- Succeeded by: William G. Brownlow

Military Tennessee Secretary of State
- In office March 12, 1862 – April 5, 1865
- Appointed by: Andrew Johnson
- Preceded by: J. E. R. Ray
- Succeeded by: A. J. Fletcher

Personal details
- Born: October 1, 1830 Davidson County, Tennessee
- Died: November 12, 1904 (aged 74) Davidson County, Tennessee
- Resting place: Mount Olivet Cemetery (Nashville)
- Party: Whig; Opposition; Republican; Prohibition
- Spouse: Ida Horton
- Profession: Attorney

Edward Hazzard East (October 1, 1830 – November 12, 1904) was an American attorney, judge, and politician. He served as Secretary of State for the state of Tennessee from 1862 to 1865, having been appointed by Andrew Johnson, the state's military governor under the Union Army occupation during the Civil War. East briefly served as the state's acting governor during the interim between Johnson's inauguration as U.S. Vice President on March 4, 1865, and the inauguration of the state's "elected" governor, William G. Brownlow, on April 5, 1865.

== Life and career ==
East was born in Davidson County, Tennessee, one of ten children of Edward Hyde East and Celia Buchanan East. His paternal grandfather, Benjamin East, had migrated from England in the 18th century. His father served as a justice of the peace for Davidson County, and was a supporter of Whig presidential candidate Hugh Lawson White in 1836.

East enrolled in Washington Institute in Nashville in the late 1840s, and graduated with a degree in literature in 1850. He then studied law at the Cumberland University Law School (now the Cumberland School of Law), graduating with a Bachelor of Laws in 1853. Afterward, he practiced law in Nashville.

In 1859, East, a lifelong Whig, was elected to the Tennessee House of Representatives as a member of the Opposition Party (which the state's Whigs had formed after the collapse of the national Whig Party). In the months leading up to the Civil War, East steadfastly opposed secession. When the state began to align itself with the Confederacy, he resigned his seat. While he supported the Union, he refused to take up arms against the South, and retired from public life.

In March 1862, the Union Army occupied Nashville, and former governor Andrew Johnson was appointed military governor of the state. Shortly afterward, Johnson set up a cabinet: East was appointed secretary of state, Joseph S. Fowler was appointed comptroller, and Horace Maynard was appointed attorney general. When Johnson was elected vice president on Lincoln's ticket in November 1864, authorities realized there would be a month between Johnson's inauguration as vice president on March 4, 1865, and the inauguration of William G. Brownlow as governor on April 5. Several of Lincoln's advisors suggested he appoint Brownlow military governor for this interim, but Lincoln chose to allow East to continue as acting governor. The official Tennessee Blue Book does not recognize East's governorship and does not include East in its official list of former governors.

When Johnson became president following Lincoln's assassination, he asked East to serve in his cabinet, but East declined. East served as chancellor for Davidson County from 1869 to 1870, and chancellor for the state's Seventh Division (created by the 1870 state constitution) from 1870 to 1872. Afterward, he worked as counsel for the Nashville, Chattanooga and St. Louis Railway.

In 1874, East was elected to the Tennessee House of Representatives, and served as chairman of the Ways and Means Committee. As such, he was instrumental in convincing the state to acknowledge and resolve its debt issues. The state's Greenback Party nominated East as their candidate for governor in 1878, but he declined the nomination. In 1892, East ran for governor on the Prohibition Party ticket, but placed a distant fourth behind Democrat Peter Turney, Republican George W. Winstead, and Farm-Labor incumbent John P. Buchanan.

== Death ==
East died in Davidson County on November 12, 1904. He is interred at Mount Olivet Cemetery in Nashville.

== Family life and public service ==
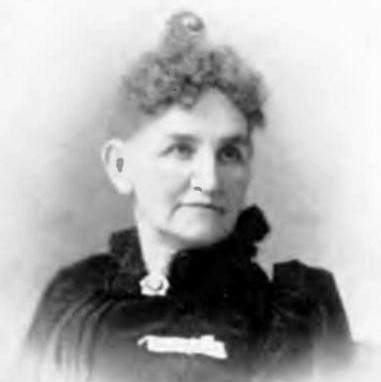
"Mrs Edward H East"

East was the second husband of Ida Horton. Edward and Ida had two daughters, Edine and Bessie. Ida was active in the Temperance movement.

East served on the inaugural board of trust of Vanderbilt University. He was also president of the board of trust for the Tennessee School for the Blind in Nashville, and president of the board of directors for the Tennessee Hospital for the Insane. In 1880, he was awarded an honorary LL.D from the University of Nashville. East represented the Methodist Episcopal Church, South, at the Methodist Ecumenical Council in London in 1881.

== See also ==
- List of governors of Tennessee

Political offices
Preceded by J. E. R. Ray	Secretary of State of Tennessee; 1862–1865	Succeeded by A. J. Fletcher
