= Bunkhouse =

Workers' dormitory at ranches or logging camps

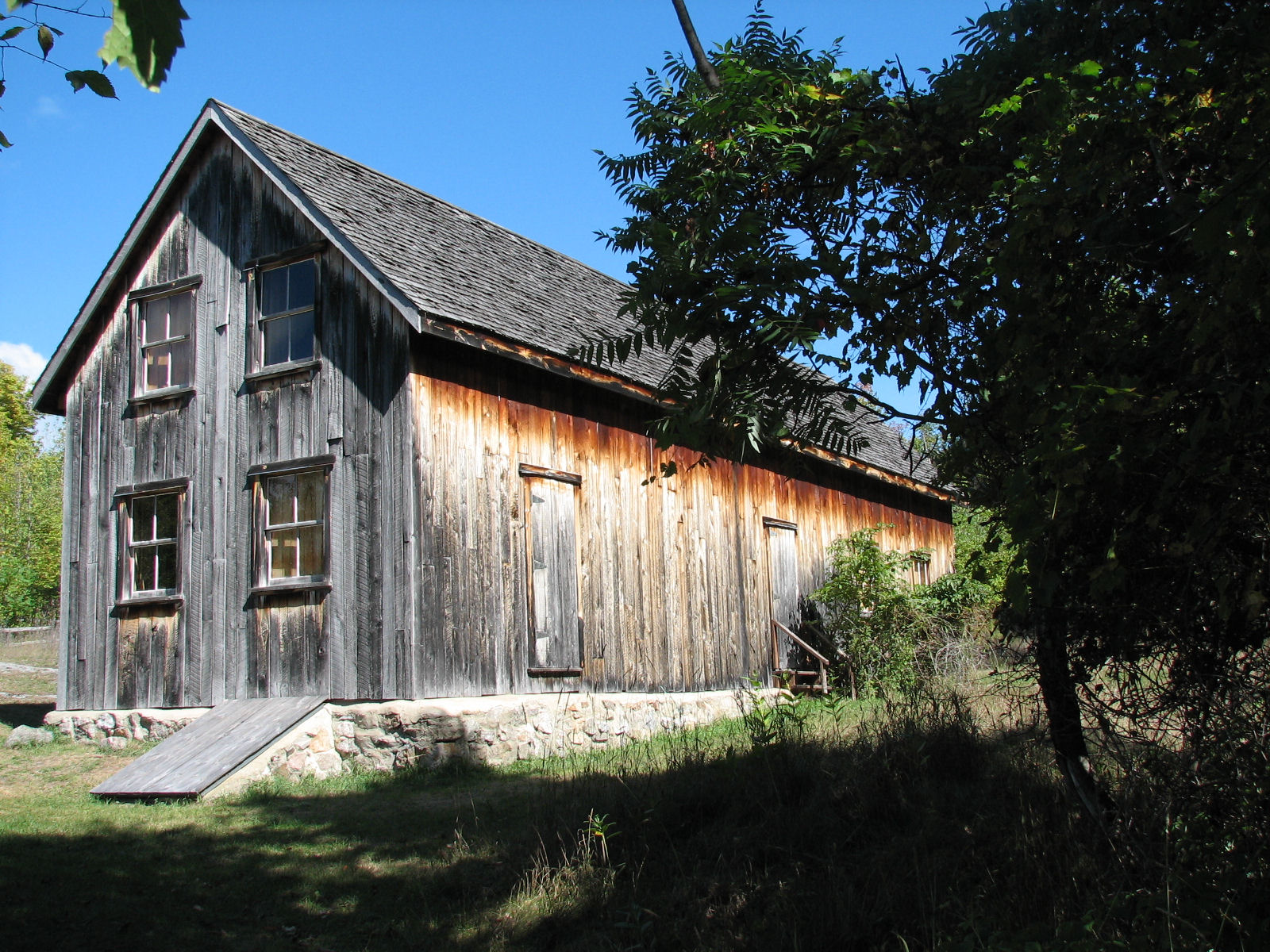
Bunkhouse

A bunkhouse is a barracks-like building that historically was used to house working cowboys on ranches, or loggers in a logging camp in North America. As most cowboys were young single men, the standard bunkhouse was a large open room with narrow beds or cots for each individual and little privacy. The bunkhouse of the late 19th century was usually heated by a wood stove and personal needs were attended to in a cookhouse and an outhouse.

== Background ==
Strawberry workers near Hammond, Louisiana playing poker in a bunkhouse in 1939.

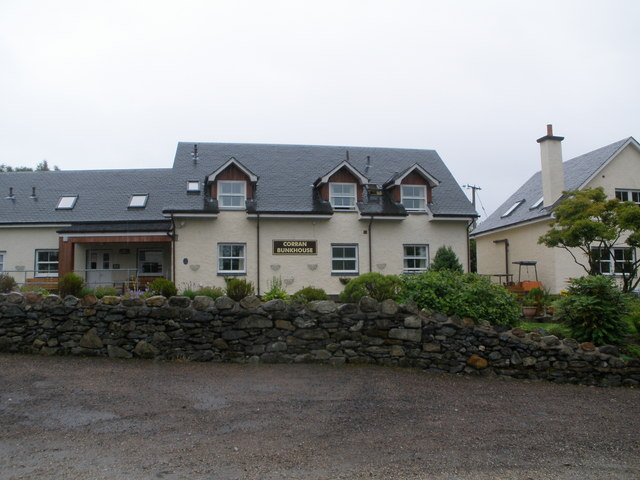
Corran Bunkhouse, Scotland

While the modern bunkhouse today is still in existence on some large ranches that are too far away from towns for an easy daily commute, it now has electricity, central heating and modern indoor plumbing.

In the United Kingdom, a bunkhouse provides accommodation with fewer facilities than a larger, staffed youth hostel. Bunkhouses are found in mountainous areas, such as the Scottish Highlands, as well as rural areas in England and Wales, for example at All Stretton. Bunkhouses are very different from hotels: bunkhouses often just offer a basic accommodation with few amenities for passers-by such as hikers.

== See also ==
- Guest ranch
- Mountain hut
- Man camp
- Bothy
