= College Grove, Tennessee =

College Grove
- Unincorporated community
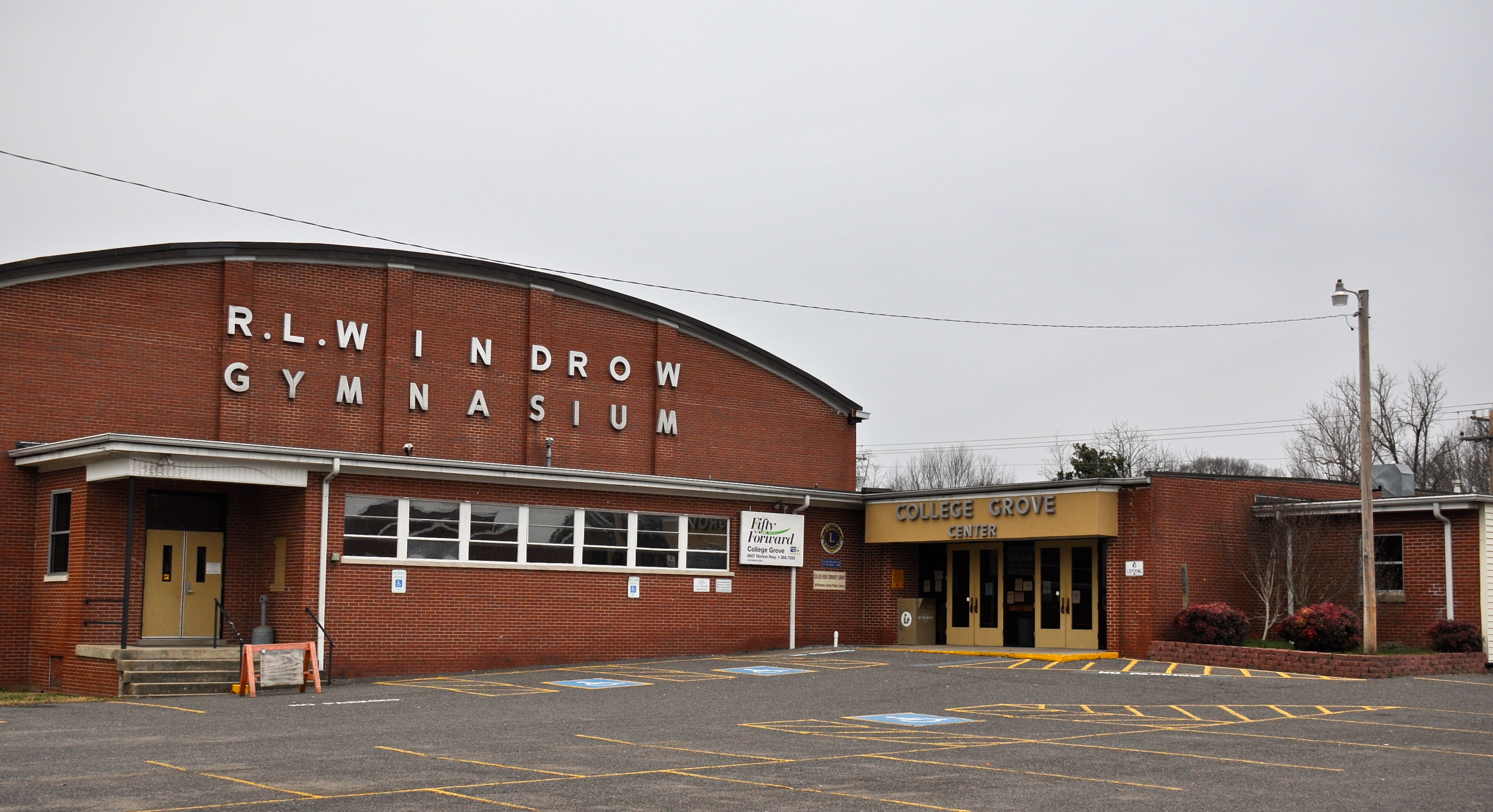
- College Grove Community Center and R.L. Windrow Gymnasium, December 2013.

- Location within Tennessee Location within the United States
- Coordinates: 35°47′15.5″N 86°40′30.3″W
- Country: United States
- State: Tennessee
- Counties: Williamson
- Elevation: 732 ft (223 m)
- Time zone: UTC-6 (CST)
  - Summer (DST): UTC-5 (CDT)
- ZIP Code: 37046

College Grove is an unincorporated community near Franklin and Murfreesboro in Williamson County, Tennessee. College Grove is predominantly rural.

== History ==
Williamson County was founded in 1799, and College Grove was one of its early communities. College Grove gained population during 1880–1920. College Grove includes commercial and rural structures.

In the spring of 1861 the Webb Guards company of the Tennessee infantry was raised from the towns of Triune, College Grove, Peytonsville and Bethesda. The company was then organized as Company D of the 20th Tennessee Volunteer Infantry.

In the 1880s, College Grove had "100 residents, with three cotton gins, two corn and saw mills, two general stores, and a wagon maker."

== Landmark buildings ==
Located in College Grove is the former The Bank of College Grove, whose National Register of Historic Places-listed building now houses a successor national banking institution.

The College Grove Methodist Church is NRHP-listed and is described in the Williamson MRA.

Places listed on the National Register in or near College Grove are:

- William Allison House, U.S. Route 31A, 2 miles south of College Grove
- The Bank of College Grove, U.S. Route 31A
- Bostick Female Academy, on U.S. Route 41A in Triune, is listed in the NRIS database as being in College Grove.
- College Grove Methodist Church, U.S. Route 31A
- William Ogilvie House, western side of U.S. Route 31A, 1 mile south of College Grove
- Dr. Urban Owen House, U.S. Route 31A
- Parks Place, Cox Rd.

== Notable residents ==
- Meredith Poindexter Gentry - Member of the Federal Congress at the beginning of the American Civil War and afterwards became a member of the Confederate Congress.
- Keith Bilbrey - Television and Radio personality, noted for his time as announcer for Grand Ole Opry.
- Bruce Bochy - Future Baseball Hall of Fame manager.

== Gallery ==
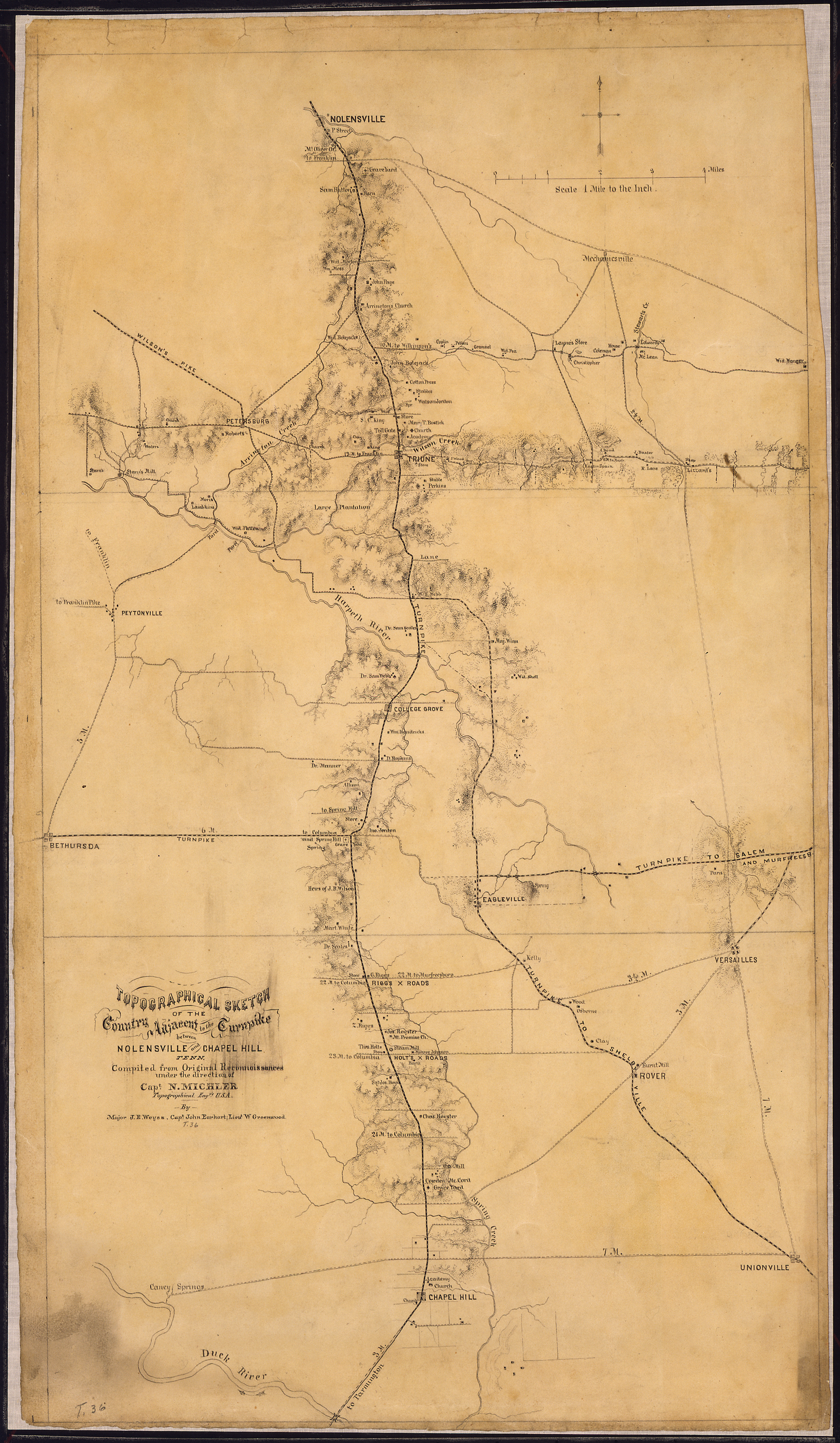
Topographical sketch with College Grove and vicinity circa 1861–1865.
