= William Allison House (College Grove, Tennessee) =

Historic house in Tennessee, United States

- U.S. National Register of Historic Places
- Location within Tennessee Location within the United States
- Nearest city: College Grove, Tennessee
- Coordinates: 35°45′48″N 86°41′25″W
- Area: 1 acre (0.40 ha)
- Built: 1827–32, c. 1860, c. 1940
- Architectural style: Federal, Central passage plan
- MPS: Williamson County MRA
- NRHP reference No.: 88000288
- Added to NRHP: April 13, 1988

The William Allison House (also known as Allison Heights) near College Grove, Tennessee is an antebellum, brick central passage plan house with Federal style detailing built during 1827–1832. It is a two-story house with a two-story rear ell and exterior brick chimneys. It has a one-story shed-roof addition from c. 1860 and a c. 1940 porch.

== Description and history ==
The house was built by William Allison, whose father James Allison had acquired a large estate of several hundred acres. James had married into the family of William Ogilvie, who was an original settler in the creek area in 1800. William Allison died in 1834. The home was later owned by one of his sons, Thomas P.P. Allison who fought in the Fourth Tennessee Cavalry during the American Civil War and was promoted to major. Thomas P.P. Allison became a prosperous farmer and also served in the Tennessee legislature (during 1871–73) and was Commissioner of Agriculture for the state during 1893–1897. He promoted the use of fertilizers. After he died in 1913 the property was sold by his wife.

It was listed on the National Register of Historic Places in 1988. The property was listed on the National Register in 1988 study of Williamson County historical resources, which described the house as "imposing" and as one of the most finely crafted residences in the College Grove area.

A c. 1830 log structure survived nearby, but off the property, in 1988.
