= William Allison House (Spring Mills, Pennsylvania) =

Historic house in Pennsylvania, United States

- U.S. National Register of Historic Places
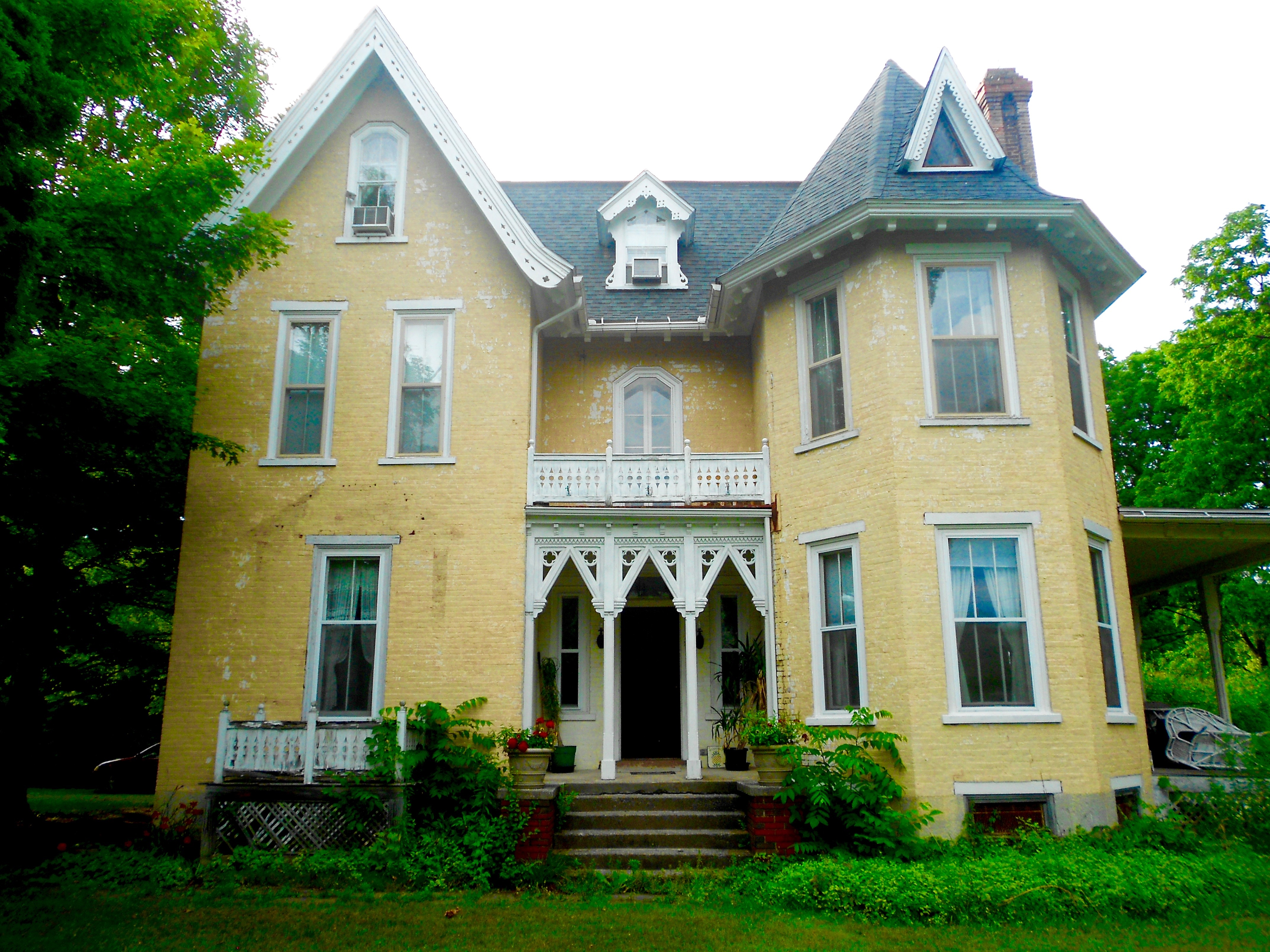

- Location within Pennsylvania Location within the United States
- Location: 1 mile (1.6 km) west of Spring Mills on Pennsylvania Route 45, Gregg Township, Pennsylvania
- Coordinates: 40°51′21″N 77°34′53″W
- Area: 1.5 acres (0.61 ha)
- Built: 1880
- Architect: Hallett, William T.
- Architectural style: Gothic
- NRHP reference No.: 77001146
- Added to NRHP: April 18, 1977

The William Allison House is an historic home that is located in Gregg Township, Centre County, Pennsylvania, United States.

It was added to the National Register of Historic Places in 1977.

== History and architectural features ==
Built in 1880, this historic structure is a three-story, rectangular, brick building that measures forty-two feet across and thirty-two feet deep. It was designed in the Victorian Gothic style. A two-story frame rear extension was built in 1890. It features a steep roof and has a variety of gable ends, bargeboards, and windows.
