= Howse =

Howse is a surname. Notable people with the surname include:

- Jo Howse, New Zealand educational administrator
- Hilary Ewing Howse (1866–1938), American businessman and politician
- Neville Howse (1863–1930), Australian soldier and politician
- Pedro Howse (21st century), guitarist
- Stanley Howse (born 1973), American rapper, member of Bone Thugs-n-Harmony
- Steven Howse-Braxton, American rapper, brother of Stanley

== See also ==
- House (disambiguation)
- Howse Pass
- Howse Peak
- Howse River
- Lindsey-Howse
- House (TV series)
