= Gates P. Thruston =

American lawyer and businessman (1835–1912)

Gates Phillips Thruston
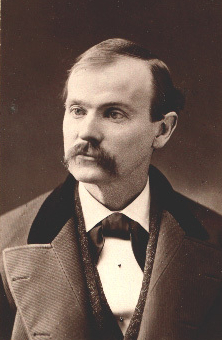
- circa 1875
- Born: June 11, 1835; Dayton, Ohio, U.S.
- Died: December 9, 1912 (aged 77); Nashville, Tennessee, U.S.
- Burial place: Mount Olivet Cemetery, Nashville, Tennessee
- Education: Miami University
- Relatives: Buckner Thruston (grandfather); Charles Mynn Thruston (uncle)
- Military career
- Allegiance: United States; Union
- Branch: Union Army
- Rank: Lieutenant Colonel; Brevet Brigadier General
- Units: 1st Ohio Infantry Regiment; XX Corps; Army of the Cumberland
- Conflicts: American Civil War: Battle of Shiloh; Battle of Stones River; Battle of Chickamauga; Atlanta campaign
- Other work: Lawyer, businessman, author

Gates Phillips Thruston (June 11, 1835 – December 9, 1912) was an American lawyer and businessman. Born in Ohio, he served in the Union Army during the American Civil War and started a legal practice in Nashville, Tennessee in the reconstruction era. He served as the president of the State Insurance Company. He also was an amateur archeologist and the author of several books about Native American mounds and artifacts. His collection is held at the Tennessee State Museum and Vanderbilt University.

== Early life ==
Gates P. Thruston was born on June 11, 1835, in Dayton, Ohio. His paternal grandfather, Buckner Thruston, was a United States Senator.

Thurston graduated as a valedictorian with a Doctor of Humane Letters in Archeology and Literature from Miami University in 1855. He received a law degree from the Cincinnati Law School.

== Civil War ==
He volunteered for the American Civil War. He joined the Union Army, being commissioned as a captain in the 1st Ohio Infantry Regiment. He took part in the battles of Shiloh and Stones River, in the later as ordnance officer on the staff of the XX Corps under Maj.Gen. Alexander M. McCook, his former regimental commander. Afterward, he became an aide and adjutant to Major General William S. Rosecrans when he commanded the Army of the Cumberland, though eventually returning to the XX Corps as its chief of staff. Thruston fought in the Battle of Chickamauga and continued his staff work under Maj.Gen. George H. Thomas during the Atlanta campaign.

He eventually was promoted to Lieutenant Colonel and served as Judge-Advocate General of the Army of the Cumberland; afterward being brevetted Brigadier General for his services during the war. Toward the end of the Civil War and during early Reconstruction, Thruston established provost courts, arguing that the only means for African-Americans to be accorded equal treatment under the law was through the supervision of the Army.

== Career ==
After the war, Thruston became a lawyer in Nashville, Tennessee. He retired from legal practice in 1878. Two years later, in 1880, he was appointed president of the State Insurance Company.

== Personal life ==
Thruston was married twice. He married his first wife, Ida Hamilton, the daughter of James M. Hamilton, in December 1865. In 1894, he married Fanny Dorman. He had a son, Gates Thruston Jr., who predeceased him.

Thruston served as the vice president of the Tennessee Historical Society. An amateur archaeologist, Thruston dug at Noel Farm in Nashville, where he found Native American artifacts, and he started a collection. He also dug at Pompei in Italy. In 1890, he published his first book privately. Entitled The Antiquities of Tennessee and the Adjacent States, it was reviewed in American Anthropologist, the flagship journal of the American Anthropological Association. When it was republished for commercial use in 1897, it was reviewed in Science, the journal of the American Association for the Advancement of Science. Thurston wrote several other books.

Thruston was a commissioner of the Watkins Institute. He was also the president of the Nashville Art Association. Additionally, he served on the board of trustees of the University of Nashville.

Additionally, Thruston was a collector of medals and coins for which he won an award at the Tennessee Centennial and International Exposition. He was a fellow of the American Association for the Advancement of Science.

Thruston died on December 9, 1912, in Nashville, Tennessee. A Presbyterian minister conducted his funeral; pall-bearers included James Hampton Kirkland and Robert Ewing, and he was buried at the Mount Olivet Cemetery.

His collection of Native American artifacts, which he had donated to Vanderbilt University in 1907, has been exhibited at the Tennessee State Museum since 1986. A book about the collection authored by Stephen D. Cox, the curator of cultural history at the museum, was published in 1985.

== Works ==
- Thruston, Gates Phillips (1897). The Antiquities of Tennessee and the Adjacent States and the State of Aboriginal Society in the Scale of Civilization Represented by Them. Cincinnati, Ohio: The R. Clarke Company.
- Thruston, Gates Phillips (1904). Tennessee Archeology at St. Louis--The Thruston Exhibit. Milwaukee, Wisconsin. OCLC 84137039.
- Thruston, Gates P. (1909). The Numbers and Rosters of the Two Armies in the Civil War. Philadelphia, Pennsylvania: C. Moore. OCLC 8000193.
- Thurston, Gates Phillips (1909). A sketch of the ancestry of the Thruston Phillips families; with some records of the Dickinson, Houston, January ancestry, and allied family connections. Nashville, Tennessee: Press Brandon Printing Company. OCLC 2854837.
