= Alexander Allison =

American politician

Alexander Allison (c. 1799–1862) was an American politician. He served as the Mayor of Nashville, Tennessee from 1847 to 1849.

== Early life ==
Allison was born about 1799 in Lifford, County Donegal, Ireland. After immigrating to the United States, he established a successful dry goods business in Nashville.

== Career ==
Allison served as Mayor of Nashville from 1847 to 1849. He was appointed by Governor Neill S. Brown as one of the commissioners to establish a "hospital for the insane" in Nashville, designed by architect Adolphus Heiman. He also served on the building committee of First Presbyterian Church.

Allison enslaved twelve people in Nashville and twenty in Davidson County.

== People He Enslaved ==
According to the Nashville Public Library’s Enslaved and Free People of Color Database, Alexander Allison is recorded as having enslaved the following people. Their ages, when known, and the year the record was created are included.

- Aleck – 1862
- Will – 1862
- Wesley – 1862
- Sam – 1862
- Robert – 1862
- Martha Ann – 1862
- Louisa – 1862
- Little Anthony – 1862
- Linda – 1862
- John – 1862
- Puss – 1862
- Jim – 1862
- George – 1862
- Frank – 1862
- Ellen – 1862
- Bob – 1862
- Anthony – 1862
- Andrew – 1862
- Amelia – 1862
- Amanda – 1862
- Joe – 1862
- Martha Ann – 1863
- Louisa – 1863
- Joe – 1863
- Jim – 1863
- George – 1863
- Amelia – 1863
- Elick – 1863
- Bob – 1863
- Anthony – 1863
- Puss – 1863
- Frank – 1863
- Sam – 1863

== Personal life and death ==
Allison was married to Madeline T. Alcorn. Their son James Hart Allison died at the Battle of Monterey in 1846 at the age of twenty-two, and John Allcorn Allison died of apoplexy at the age of twenty-three. They resided at 9 Summer Place in Nashville, and one of their neighbors was Samuel Morgan. He died on November 3, 1862, and he is buried in the Nashville City Cemetery.

Political offices
Preceded by John A. Goodlett	Mayor of Nashville, Tennessee; 1847-1849	Succeeded by John McCormick Lea
