= Andrew Anderson (mayor) =

American politician

Mayor of Nashville, Tennessee
- In office 1855–1857
- Preceded by: Robert Bell Castleman
- Succeeded by: John A. McEwen

Personal details
- Born: June 19, 1795; Nashville, Tennessee, US
- Died: April 19, 1867 (aged 71); Nashville, Tennessee, US
- Children: 3

Andrew Anderson (1795–1867) was mayor of Nashville, Tennessee, from 1855 to 1857.

== Life ==
He was born on June 19, 1795, in Nashville, Tennessee. He died on April 19, 1867, at the age of 71 from heart disease.

He was mayor of Nashville, Tennessee, from 1855 to 1857.
