= Gupton =

Gupton is a surname. Notable people with the surname include:

- Kyle Gupton (born 1990), American basketball player
- William Gupton (1870-1957), American politician

== See also ==
- Gupton, North Carolina
- John A. Gupton College
