= Robert Ewing =

Robert Ewing may refer to:

- Robert Ewing (mayor) (1849–1932), mayor of Nashville, Tennessee, 1915–1917
- Bobby Ewing, fictional character in Dallas
- Bob Ewing (1873–1947), American baseball player
- Robert Ewing Thomason (1879–1973), Texas politician
- Robert Ewing (sound editor), television sound editor and producer of The Trial of the Incredible Hulk
