= Thomas A. Kercheval =

American politician

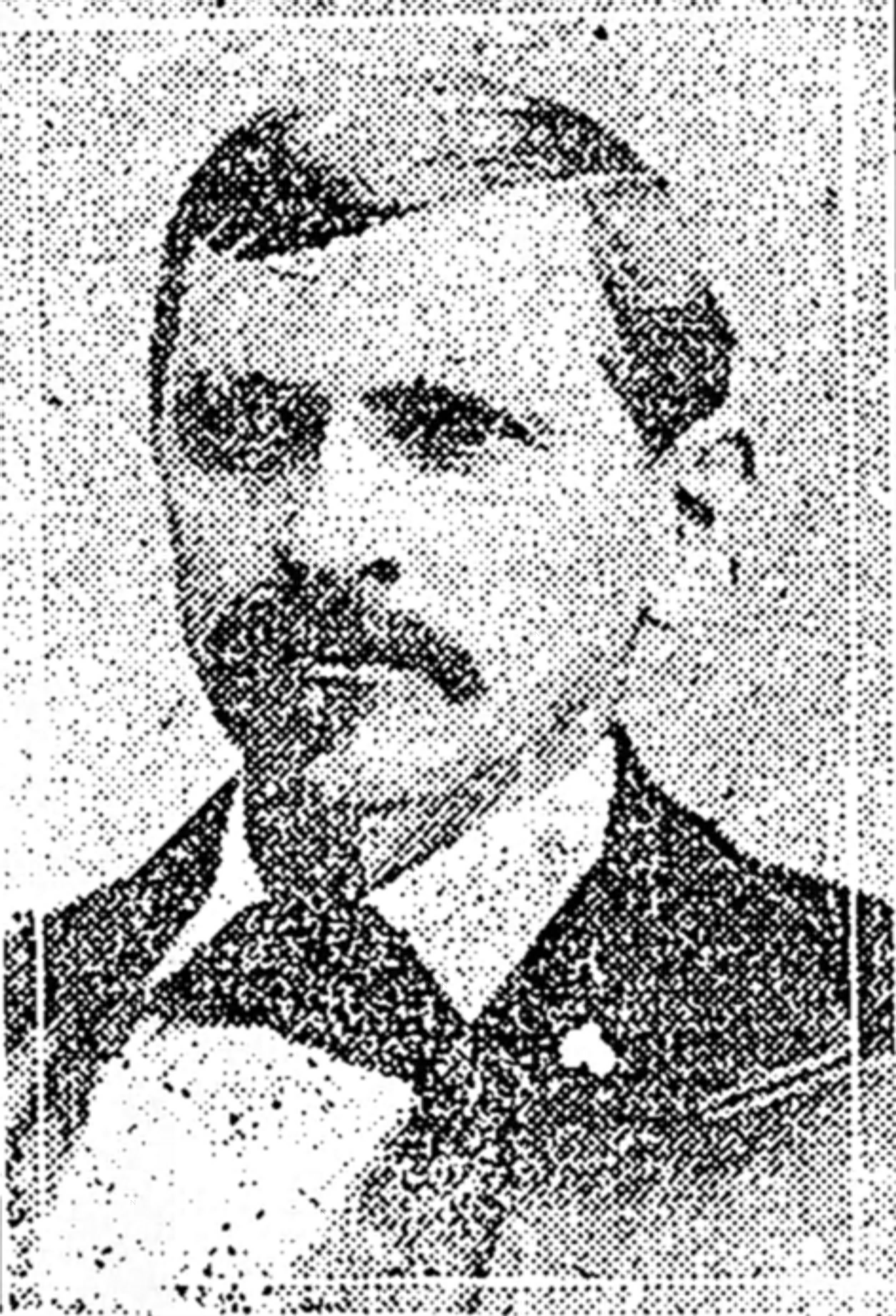
Nashville Mayor Thomas A. Kercheval

Thomas A. Kercheval (January 16, 1837 – March 22, 1915) was a Republican Tennessee Senator and the Mayor of Nashville for twelve years.

== Early life ==
Kercheval was born in Maury County, Tennessee on January 16, 1837. He was educated at Jackson College in Maury County and also attended Burritt College for two years. He studied law with his brother, William F. Kercheval, in Fayetteville, Tennessee, and was admitted to the bar in January, 1860.

== Career ==
In December, 1862, he moved to Nashville and worked in the Provost Marshal's office from 1863 to 1864. Kercheval was first elected to the State Legislature in 1865, during the reorganization of the state government under William Brownlow's administration. He served from 1865 to 1869. Afterward, he practiced law in Nashville until 1871, when he was elected Alderman of the Fourth Ward, and to the City Council of Nashville. He was elected Mayor of Nashville in 1872, and reelected in 1873. He ran for a third term, but was defeated by Morton B. Howell. After Howell's first term as mayor expired, Kercheval was reelected in 1875. He continued to serve successive terms up until his defeat by Claiborne Hooper Phillips in 1883. He was elected to the Tennessee State Senate in 1884, serving from 1885 to 1886. Kercheval was again reelected mayor in 1886, but resigned as mayor in 1888 to join the Board of Public Works. The remainder of his term was filled by Charles P. McCarver.

== Personal life and death ==
On October 11, 1874, Kercheval married Alice Gardner Brien of Nashville. He died in Nashville on March 22, 1915. He is interred at Mount Olivet Cemetery.

Preceded by Kindred Jenkins Morris	Mayor of Nashville, Tennessee; 1871–1874	Succeeded by Morton Boyte Howell
Preceded by Morton Boyte Howell	Mayor of Nashville, Tennessee; 1875–1883	Succeeded by Claiborne Hooper Phillips
Preceded by Thomas L. Dodd	State Senator for Cheatham and Davidson Counties; 1885–1886	Succeeded by George Earl Maney
Preceded by Claiborne Hooper Phillips	Mayor of Nashville, Tennessee; 1886–1888	Succeeded by Charles P. McCarver
