= Powhatan W. Maxey =

American politician

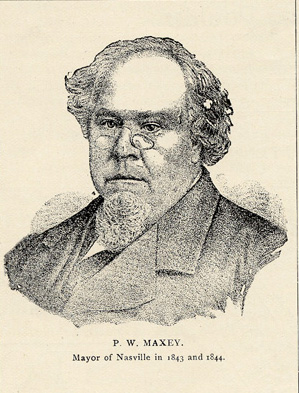
Portrait of Powhatan W. Maxey

Powhatan W. Maxey (1810–1876) was an American Whig politician. He served as the Mayor of Nashville, Tennessee from 1843 to 1845.

== Early life ==
Powhatan Woolridge Maxey was born on May 7, 1810. His parents were from Virginia, and he had six brothers and seven sisters.

== Career ==
Maxey sat on the Nashville Board of Aldermen. From 1843 to 1845, He served as Mayor of Nashville. During his tenure, what was then known as Campbell's Hill was bought from George W. Campbell for $30,000 to build the new Tennessee State Capitol. He also served as a Justice of the Peace.

== Personal life and death ==
Maxey married Julia Hobbs on October 18, 1832. They had six children. He attended McKendree Methodist Church and later, Hobson Chapel Methodist Church. He died on August 8, 1876, and he is buried in the Nashville City Cemetery.

Political offices
Preceded by Thomas B. Coleman	Mayor of Nashville, Tennessee; 1843–1845	Succeeded by John Hugh Smith
