= Hilary Ewing Howse =

American politician

Hilary E. Howse in 1910

Hilary Ewing Howse (January 25, 1866– January 2, 1938) was an American businessman and politician. He served as the Mayor of Nashville from 1909 to 1915, and again from 1923 to 1938.

== Early life ==
Howse was born on January 25, 1866 in Blackman, Rutherford County, Tennessee. He was the son of Lycurgus H. Howse and his wife Mary Louise Bell. Howse was raised on a farm and educated in the local schools.

== Career ==
Howse left home at the age of eighteen and found work in a Nashville mattress factory. He later became a furniture store clerk. Howse and his brothers eventually established their own furniture company.

Howse served as a Democratic Party member of the Tennessee Senate for Davidson County from 1905 to 1907 and again from 1909 to 1911. He was also elected Mayor of Nashville in 1909 despite significant objections. Howse was removed from office in 1915 because of fiscal misconduct at city hall, but was later cleared of personal responsibility. He ran for reelection in 1917, but lost by a small margin. Howse was successfully reelected in 1923 and served as mayor until January 2, 1938.

Howse was an anti-prohibitionist and is attributed to the quote, "As long as I stay in a free country, I will eat and drink as I please."

== Death ==
About a month before his seventy-second birthday, Howse was admitted to Protestant Hospital in Nashville with paralytic ileus, an intestinal ailment. He contracted pneumonia and died there on January 2, 1938. Howse was buried in Mount Olivet Cemetery.

Political offices
| Preceded by James Stephens Brown | Mayor of Nashville, Tennessee; 1909–1915 | Succeeded by Robert Ewing |
| Preceded by William Percy Sharpe | Mayor of Nashville, Tennessee; 1924–1938 | Succeeded by Thomas L. Cummings Sr. |
