= Williamson Hartley Horn =

American politician

Williamson Hartley Horn (1799–1870) was an American Masonic leader and Whig politician. He served as the mayor of Nashville, Tennessee from 1853 to 1854.

== Early life ==
Horn was born in Lynchburg, Virginia on July 15, 1799. His father was Frederick Horn and his mother, Clarisa (Hartley) Horn. They moved to Nashville in 1809.

== Career ==
Horn owned W. H. Horn and Son, a painting store at 15 South College Street, currently Third Avenue in Nashville.

Horn was elected to the Nashville Board of Aldermen from 1845 to 1846, in 1852, 1856, 1859, and in 1860. He served as Mayor of Nashville from 1853 to 1854. During his mayoral term, he introduced a bill that established free public schools in Nashville.

Horn was a freemason. In 1826, he became a Master Mason in the Cumberland Lodge. He was also a Knight Templar, a Knight of Malta, and Grand Treasurer of the Grand Chapter, Council and Commandery.

== Personal life and death ==
Horn married Nancy Carpenter in 1817. They had four sons, Ed. H., Richard H., Fletcher. W., Charles. F., and two daughters, Caroline (Dascum) and Nancy C. Horn (Price). They lived in an apartment on top of his store. He died on March 8, 1870, and he is buried in the Nashville City Cemetery.

Political offices
Preceded by John Hugh Smith	Mayor of Nashville, Tennessee; 1853–1854	Succeeded by William Booker Shapard
