= Felix Zollicoffer Wilson =

American politician (1866–1950)

Mayor of Nashville, Tennessee
- In office 1921–1922
- Preceded by: William Gupton
- Succeeded by: William Percy Sharpe

Personal details
- Born: December 27, 1866; Davidson County, Tennessee, U.S.
- Died: February 12, 1950

Felix Zollicoffer Wilson (1866–1950) was an American Democratic politician. He served as the Mayor of Nashville, Tennessee from 1921 to 1922.

== Early life ==
Wilson was born in Davidson County, Tennessee on December 27, 1866. His father was James Hazzard Wilson and his mother was the daughter of Confederate General Felix Zollicoffer.

Wilson was educated at the Howard School and Goodman's Business College in Nashville.

== Career ==
Wilson began his career as a grocer at the age of 14.

Wilson served on the Nashville City Council in 1902 and in 1943. He became County Register in 1945. He was the trustee of Davidson County from 1914 to 1917.

Wilson was elected as Mayor of Nashville by the city council, after the council had voted to suspend Mayor William Gupton. He was seen as a reformer, and supported women's rights. However, he was voted out of office by the city council in November 1922.

Wilson became magistrate from the First Civil District in 1930. He elected as the county register for Davidson county in 1945.

== Personal life and death ==
Wilson was married to Mary Pendergast in 1888. They had two sons, James P. Wilson and Mizell Wilson, and three daughters. Wilson resided at 1900 West End Avenue in Nashville. He was a member of the Knights of Pythias and the Order of Red Men. He was a council commander of the Woodmen of the World.

Wilson died on February 12, 1950. His funeral was held at the Christ Church Cathedral, and he was buried in Mount Calvary Cemetery.

Political offices
Preceded by William Gupton	Mayor of Nashville, Tennessee; 1921-1922	Succeeded by William Percy Sharpe
