= Tennessee State Route 452 =

State highway in Tennessee, United States

State Route 452
- Bill France Boulevard
- TN 452 highlighted in red

Route information
- Maintained by TDOT
- Length: 4.6 mi (7.4 km)

Major junctions
- West end: I-840 northeast of Smyrna
- East end: US 231 northeast of Smyrna

Location
- Country: United States
- State: Tennessee
- Counties: Wilson, Rutherford

Highway system
- Tennessee State Routes; Interstate; US; State
← SR 451	→ SR 454

State Route 452 (SR 452), also known as Bill France Boulevard, is a west–east state highway that runs along the border between Rutherford and Wilson counties in the middle part of the U.S. state of Tennessee.

It is primarily a service road for the Nashville Superspeedway, connecting I-840 with US 231/SR 10.

The route is named after NASCAR founder Bill France Sr.

== Route description ==
SR 452' begins at an interchange with I-840 northeast of Smyrna in Rutherford County. The road travels to the east-southeast and crosses into Wilson County. Immediately after skirting along the southern edge of the Nashville Superspeedway, it curves to the south-southeast and re-enters Rutherford County. Then, it curves back to the east-southeast. After it crosses into Wilson County again, it meets its eastern terminus, an intersection with US 231/SR 10 (Murfreesboro Road).

== Major intersections ==
County	Location	mi	km	Destinations	Notes
Rutherford		0.0	0.0	I-840 – Murfreesboro, Lebanon	Western terminus; exit 65 on I-840; former SR 840
Wilson	No major junctions				
Rutherford	No major junctions				
Wilson		4.6	7.4	US 231 (Murfreesboro Road/SR 10) – Murfreesboro, Lebanon	Eastern terminus
1.000 mi = 1.609 km; 1.000 km = 0.621 mi
