= John Meredith Bass =

American politician (1804–1878)

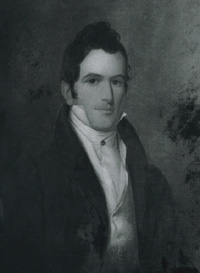
- Born: January 19, 1804; Nashville, Tennessee, U.S.
- Died: March 14, 1878 (aged 74); New Orleans, Louisiana, U.S.
- Resting place: Mount Olivet Cemetery
- Education: University of Nashville; Transylvania University
- Occupations: Politician, banker, businessman, planter
- Spouse: Malvina Grundy
- Parent: Peter Bass
- Relatives: Felix Grundy (father-in-law)

John Meredith Bass (January 19, 1804– March 14, 1878) was an American banker, planter and Whig politician based in Nashville, Tennessee. He was active in politics in the city and region. Among his roles was serving as the mayor of Nashville, Tennessee from 1833 to 1834, and again in 1869.

== Early life ==
John Meredith Bass was born on January 19, 1804, in Nashville, Tennessee. His father, Peter Bass, was a real estate investor in Nashville. His mother was from Kentucky.

Bass was educated in the lower grades at schools in Kentucky. He graduated from the University of Nashville, and earned a law degree from Transylvania University. He was "admitted to the bar in 1830" and returned to Nashville to build a practice.

== Career ==
Bass became politically active with the Whig Party, being elected to the board of aldermen of Nashville (1831–1832). He was elected and served as mayor of Nashville (1833–1834). Additionally, he was "one of the commissioners who built the Nashville water-works."

Bass became the president of the Union Bank of Tennessee in 1837. He was also the founding president of the Southern Life Insurance Company. Additionally, he owned plantations in Louisiana and Arkansas.

Bass served on the board of trustees of the Nashville Female Academy (also known as the Old Academy), and the University of Nashville. In 1869, Bass served as the "receiver" of Nashville, for which he gave a $1 million bond.

== Personal life and death ==
On January 7, 1829, Bass married Malvina Grundy, the eighteen-year-old daughter of Senator Felix Grundy and his wife Nancy.

Bass became a personal friend of wealthy slave trader John Armfield, who established a plantation in Nashville after moving from his business based in Alexandria, Virginia. In 1860 Bass became a stockholder in the Beersheba Springs Company and owned a cottage at Beersheba Springs, Tennessee, as did Armfield.

Bass died on March 14, 1878, in New Orleans, where he was visiting his daughter. He wife had died before him; they were both buried in Mount Olivet Cemetery in Nashville.

Political offices
Preceded by William Armstrong	Mayor of Nashville, Tennessee; 1833–1834	Succeeded by John Patton Erwin
Preceded by Augustus E. Alden	Mayor of Nashville, Tennessee; 1869–1869	Succeeded by Kindred Jenkins Morris
