= Mizell Wilson =

American football player, lieutenant, and lawyer

- Born: November 24, 1897; Nashville, Tennessee
- Died: July 18, 1968 (aged 70); White Plains, New York
- Occupation: Lawyer
- Football career

No. 16
- Position: Guard

Personal information
- Listed weight: 160 lb (73 kg)

Career information
- High school: Montgomery Bell
- College: Vanderbilt (1920–1921)

Felix Mizell Wilson (November 24, 1897 – July 18, 1968) was a lieutenant and lawyer, the son of Felix Zollicoffer Wilson. He was once a college football player for coach Dan McGugin's Vanderbilt Commodores football teams. Wilson worked with the New York law firm of Milbank, Tweed, Hope & Hadle.
