= Charles P. McCarver =

American politician

Charles McCarver

Mayor of Nashville
- In office 1888–1890

Personal details
- Born: c. 1851 Jackson County, Tennessee
- Died: 28 September 1892
- Party: Democratic
- Children: 3

Charles Pinkney McCarver (c. 1851 in Jackson County, Tennessee – September 28, 1892) was an American Democratic politician who served as the Mayor of Nashville, Tennessee from 1888 to 1890, resigning before the end of his term.

== Personal life ==
McCarver had three children.

Political offices
Preceded by Thomas A. Kercheval	Mayor of Nashville, Tennessee; 1888–1890	Succeeded by William Litterer
