= Albert Smiley Williams =

American politician (1849–1924)

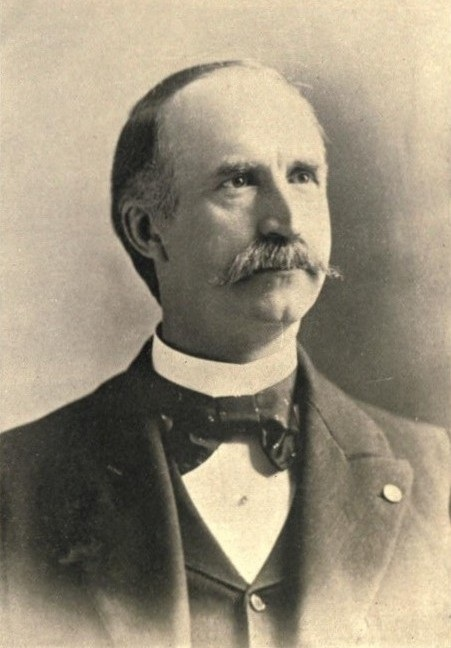
Albert S. Williams in 1896

Albert Smiley Williams (November 15, 1849 – March 25, 1924) was an American Democratic politician. He served as the Mayor of Nashville, Tennessee, from 1904 to 1906.

== Early life and education ==
Williams was born in Davidson County, Tennessee on November 15, 1849. He was the son of schoolteacher William A. Williams, who was born in Virginia, and his wife Catherine Turner.

Williams was educated in Nashville's public schools and then graduated from the Oak Plain institute in 1870. He subsequently completed the full course of commercial training at Bryant & Stratton College in Nashville.

== Career ==
Williams worked in the banking industry, eventually becoming president of City Savings bank in Nashville in 1901.

Williams served as Mayor of Edgefield (now part of East Nashville) from 1876 to 1877, and of Nashville from 1904 to 1906. In 1878, he was elected clerk of the Davidson County criminal courts and served in that office for four years. In 1896, Williams served as president of the city council in Nashville.

Williams was a member of the Order of the Eastern Star. He was also an eminent commander of the Knights Templar and a member of the Independent Order of Odd Fellows.

== Personal life and death ==
Williams was married to Amanda Rear on December 3, 1879. They had four children: Albert, Beryl (Mrs. Stanley Horn), and two children who died in childhood.

Williams died from uremia on March 25, 1924 in Nashville at the age of 74. He was interred at Mount Olivet Cemetery the following day.

Political offices
Preceded by James Marshall Head	Mayor of Nashville, Tennessee; 1904–1906	Succeeded by Thomas Owen Morris
