= Nashville Superspeedway =

Motorsport track in the United States

- Tri-Oval (2001–present)
- Location: 4847-F McCreary Road; Lebanon, Tennessee, United States; 37090
- Coordinates: 36°02′39.91″N 86°24′45.43″W
- Capacity: 25,000 (Can expand to 30,000)
- Owner: Speedway Motorsports (2021–present); Dover Motorsports (2001–2020)
- Operator: Speedway Motorsports (2021–present); Dover Motorsports (2001–2020)
- Broke ground: 26 August 1999; 27 years ago
- Opened: 7 April 2001; 25 years ago
- Construction cost: US$125 million
- Major events: Current: NASCAR Cup Series; Cracker Barrel 400 (2021–present); NASCAR O'Reilly Auto Parts Series; Sports Illustrated Resorts 250 (2001–2011, 2021–present); Federated Auto Parts 300 (2002–2011); NASCAR Truck Series; Allegiance 200 (2001–2011, 2021–present); Bully Hill Vineyards 200 (2010–2011); IndyCar Series; Borchetta Bourbon 400 (2001–2008, 2024–2026)
- Website: nashvillesuperspeedway.com

Tri-Oval (2001–present)
- Surface: Concrete
- Length: 2.140 km (1.330 mi)
- Turns: 4
- Banking: Turns: 14° Frontstretch: 9° Backstretch: 6°
- Race lap record: 0:22.9685 ( (United States) Sam Hornish Jr., Dallara IR-02, 2003, IndyCar)

Road Course (2001–present)
- Surface: Concrete
- Length: 2.897 km (1.800 mi)
- Turns: 11

Nashville Superspeedway is a 1.330 mi (2.140 km) tri-oval intermediate speedway near Lebanon, Tennessee, United States. It has held a variety of racing events since its opening in 2001, including NASCAR and the IndyCar Series. The track currently owned by Speedway Motorsports, LLC (SMI) since 2021 and led by track general manager Matt Greci.

The track has a current permanent seating capacity of 25,000, with potential to expand to 38,000 with temporary grandstands. It is one of three NASCAR tracks that features a concrete racing surface instead of the traditional asphalt; its sibling tracks in Dover, Delaware and Bristol, Tennessee, are the other two. Along with the main track, the track complex also features a 1.800 mi (2.897 km) road course layout that uses parts of the main track along with an infield road course that is used to make a "roval". The complex initially planned to expand further to include a drag strip, short track, and a dedicated road course; however, these plans were scrapped.

Initial plans for the track were announced in 1997 by Dover Downs Entertainment (last known as Dover Motorsports) as part of a rise of popularity in stock car racing in the 1990s and with hopes to bring back the NASCAR Cup Series to the Nashville area. The track opened in 2001 to host Indy Racing League and the NASCAR Busch Series. However, a decade later, all major racing left the track due to poor attendance caused by the failure to obtain a Cup Series race, and was left desolate and abandoned for nearly a decade. In 2020, in a surprise move, Dover Motorsports announced the return of NASCAR racing; this time with the NASCAR Cup Series.

== Description ==
=== Configuration ===
Nashville Superspeedway in its current form is measured at 1.330 mi (2.140 km), with 14 degrees of banking in the track's turns, nine degrees of banking in the track's frontstretch, and six degrees of banking in the track's backstretch. Varying sanctioning bodies have disputed the length of the track; NASCAR's official measurement is at 1.33 mi, while IndyCar measures the track at 1.333 mi (2.145 km).

Along with the main track, an infield road course was built with the main track's construction. According to The Daily News Journal, the course measured 1.800 mi (2.897 km), and held its first races in July 2001.

=== Amenities ===
The track is served by Interstate 840 and Tennessee State Route 452. State Route 452 was built as part of a project by the Tennessee Department of Transportation in 2000 in order to accommodate traffic for the track. According to The Tennessean, as of 2021, the track has a permanent seating capacity of 25,000, with potential to increase to 40,000 for NASCAR races with temporary grandstands. In 2023, a capacity with the temporary grandstands was reported at 38,000. At its peak, the track had a reported capacity of 50,000, with hopes of expanding to 150,000 according to a 2001 report by The Daily News Journal.

== Track history ==
=== Planning and construction ===
In the 1990s, a boom period of large-capacity and modern tracks that correlated with the rise of NASCAR occurred, with nationwide efforts being made to build tracks to lure a NASCAR Winston Cup Series race weekend. In November 1997, initial plans for a $25–30 million, 50,000-seat track to be built in the Nashville metropolitan area were made in a joint announcement between Dover Downs Entertainment (last known as Dover Motorsports) and Gaylord Entertainment (now known as Ryman Hospitality Properties), with hopes of the track hosting Winston Cup races. If successful, the track would be the first track to host Winston Cup races in Middle Tennessee since 1984, though the chance of success was met with heavy skepticism due to the track's small capacity. In the early planning stages, although track developers expressed desires to build the track and prioritize finding a location within Davidson County, they couldn't find a suitable 1,200-acre site, with developers getting suggestions to look outside Davidson County. Developers later stated that they planned to build an initial track that could hold 50,000, with potential to expand to 150,000 to 200,000 if needed.

==== Delays, opposition ====
By March 1998, although a location had not been selected, developer Denis McGlynn was "confident" the track would open by 2000. In April, he expressed hopes of hosting NHRA and IndyCar events. On May 21, developers anticipated a site decision within "three or four weeks". Three days later, The Daily News Journal reported that McGlynn had narrowed down options to four sites, likely in Rutherford or Wilson County. However, by July, construction had been delayed, putting the project at risk. However, the News Journal reported that a 1,600-acre (650 ha) plot of land owned by Harding University in northern Rutherford County was under consideration, along with a second undisclosed site. By month’s end, the company began efforts to purchase the land and other smaller parcels.

The project received mixed reactions from property owners in Rutherford County, with some refusing to sell. To further compound issues, many local residents voiced concerns about traffic and noise, with guarantees of a Winston Cup date still being thought of as a longshot. In August, Dover Downs Entertainment expanded its plans for Nashville Superspeedway, increasing the budget to $125 million and aiming to buy 2,600–2,700 acres to build an industrial park. In early October, Dover Downs opted to file a separate rezoning request for 1,600 acres of land along the Wilson County border, deciding to submit both plans; although the Rutherford County plot was preferred, the company considered moving the entire project solely to Wilson County due to about 230 acres of land not being sold by disinterested property owners. On October 20, with the Rutherford County plan receiving increased criticism and adamant holdouts, Dover Downs announced the project would proceed solely in Wilson County.

After a two-week delay for Wilson County officials to review the rezoning plans, the request was set for a hearing on November 7, with expanded plans to include a dragstrip, road course, dirt track, and a short track. The officials voted on December 21, approving the rezoning 22–3. This raised concerns over the future of Nashville Fairgrounds Speedway, valued as a historic site despite aging facilities. In February 1999, a group opposing the track, County Residents Against Racetrack Havoc (CRASH), sued Wilson County, alleging zoning violations and subsequent potential delays in construction against the county.

==== Construction ====
The local Wilson County Sports Authority, the Tennessee Department of Transportation, and Dover Downs Entertainment agreed to raise $15 million for renovations concerning the track's infrastructure, which was approved by the Tennessee General Assembly in March 1999. Due to the delays, in April, the track announced that the opening year had been pushed back to 2001. By May, the track itself, which now had a budget of $47 million, was now in doubt if it could make a sufficient economic impact. That same month, developers announced a groundbreaking date in August or September 1999, with new plans to oversee a 1,000-acre plot of land for private development. In July, Gaylord Entertainment backed out of the partnership, but Dover Downs insisted that it would not affect the construction of the track; a groundbreaking date was later announced on August 12, to take place on the 26th of the same month. The track was officially named "Nashville Superspeedway" on the 25th.

Groundbreaking took place as scheduled. However, just before the groundbreaking ceremony, CRASH accused Dover Downs and Wilson County of "fail[ing] to follow its ordinances" and a lack of notice of intent to rezone, adding to their lawsuit. Three days after the ceremony, an analysis ran by the Tennessee Department of Environment and Conservation found that building the 3,100-acre complex would seriously harm the habitat of the endangered Tennessee coneflower, with fears of destroying a major glade. As a result of this finding, CRASH attempted to tack on allegations of environmental destruction; the idea was repelled by track supporters, who claimed that the flower could survive the construction regardless and that CRASH paid no mind of the flowers until the finding was released. By January 2000, the NASCAR Busch Series (now known as the NASCAR O'Reilly Auto Parts Series) stated that in 2001, they would move from its race at the Fairgrounds to Nashville Superspeedway, along with the longstanding flagship race of the Fairgrounds, the All-American 400. Four months later, developers began to work on the foundations of the track, hoping to open in April 2001. That same month, in an abrupt transition, the track switched general managers; Cliff Hawks, the executive director of the Fairgrounds, replaced Joe Ernest.

With the additions of Chicagoland Speedway and Kansas Speedway to the Cup Series schedule, the chances of the track's hopes of getting a Cup Series date dwindled heavily despite McGlynn stating otherwise. In June, multiple developments were announced; construction of the road course began, the addition of an Indy Racing League (IRL) race, and the release of a new logo. The next month, although NASCAR stated they had no plans to hold a Cup Series race at the track, the National Hot Rod Association (NHRA) announced hopes to host events at the complex in 2002. Track paving was completed in early November, with tickets going on sale within the same month. By January 2001, the track announced additional suites from its initial 24 to accommodate higher demand. The track itself was completed the next month. The first test runs took place in early March, drawing positive reviews from testers Tim Steele and Shawna Robinson. Final approvals of zoning changes for the project were approved in the same month, essentially killing appeals made by CRASH. However, by this point, most development planned for the project hadn't started, putting the hopes of the track holding major events and economic growth for Wilson County businesses under doubt. At the end of its construction, Dover Downs was recorded to have spent $125 million on the initial phase of the project.

=== Early years ===
The track officially opened to the public on April 7, 2001, for an open house event. Five days later, after a short electrical worker pay dispute that lasted for three days, the track opened to drivers and teams for practice and qualifying sessions. It drew mixed reception from drivers of the NASCAR Busch Series; drivers such as Todd Bodine and Bobby Hamilton expressed concerns about a lack of grip, while others such as Kevin Harvick hoped that the track would gain grip as time progressed. The track held its first races on April 13 and 14, with Ken Schrader and Greg Biffle winning ARCA Re/Max Series and Busch Series events, respectively. As a result of the complaints of slickness, McGlynn opted to resurface a part of the track between the first and second turns. The facility held its first IRL race on July 21, with Buddy Lazier winning the event. Both weekends both did not see sellout crowds. Six days after the IRL event, NASCAR announced that the track was awarded a second Busch Series weekend starting in 2002. The next month, the track held its first NASCAR Truck Series event.

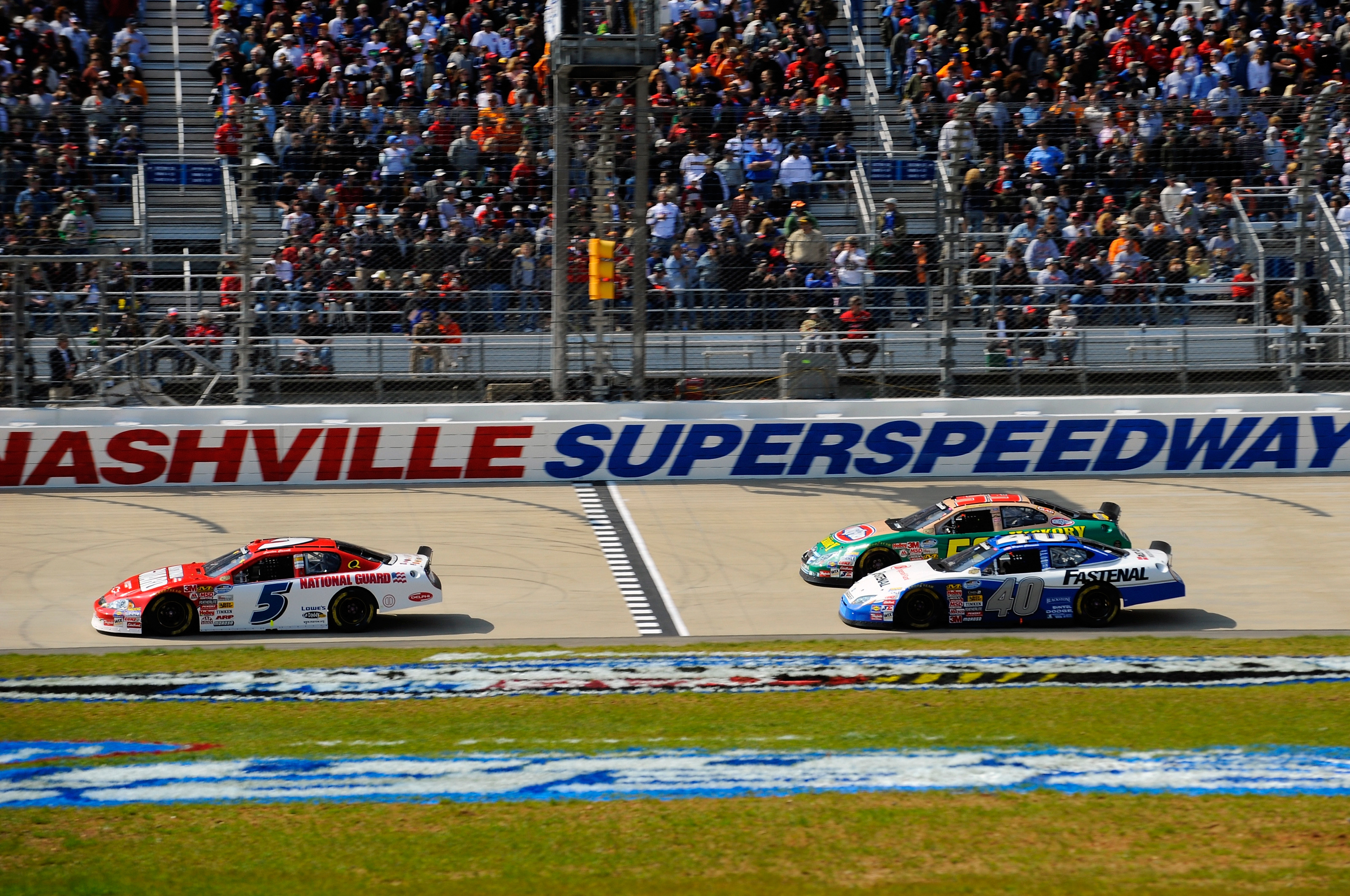
Cars racing at a NASCAR Nationwide Series (now known as the NASCAR O'Reilly Auto Parts Series) event at the Nashville Superspeedway in 2008.

In October 2009, as a result of the closure of the Dover Motorsports-owned Memphis Motorsports Park, Dover Motorsports opted to move their NASCAR Truck Series date from Memphis to Nashville, with Nashville now having two Truck Series races. The track became publicized in 2011 when Joe Nelms, pastor of the Family Baptist Church, gave a pre-race invocation that praised his family and NASCAR and its sponsors in an eccentric manner that later became an internet phenomenon. The prayer was met with mixed reception; it drew criticism from ESPN reporter David Newton for "put[ting] the spotlight on anybody but himself", while Bleacher Report writer Richard Langford praised it, stating that the invocation had "managed to produce something memorable without being disrespectful".

=== Era of disrepair and abandon ===
By 2011, the track faced a litany of issues. The track had a recorded $21 million in bond debt from a 1999 bond deal to extend sewer and water lines, lackluster attendance was prevalent, and the addition of Kentucky Speedway to the Cup Series schedule in 2011 essentially killed any hopes of the track winning rights to a Cup Series weekend; the very goal that Dover Entertainment set. On August 3, 2011, Dover Motorsports announced the track's closure for the 2012 season, with none of the projected projects, other than the tri-oval, being built. The company hoped to sell the track to another company. Although rumors were spread that the IndyCar Series would return in 2013, the closure continued into 2013 and 2014. In March 2014, Dover Motorsports representative Gary Camp stated that the only activities occurring at the facility was for testing.

==== Attempted sale to NeXovation ====
On May 30, 2014, Dover Motorsports announced that the company sold the facility to Nashville-based technology company NeXovation for $45.8 million, with the buyer hoping to renovate the track. According to journalist Larry Woody, speculation arose that the CEO of the company, Robert Sexton, had hopes of continuing original plans for the complex or to turn the track into a testing facility. In an interview with The Tennessean, Sexton stated that he wanted to make the facility run year-round, hosting both motorsports and technology-based events. However, the sale confirmation was delayed multiple times. In September, an extension was give until October 25 for NeXovation to further inspect the facility. In March 2015, after paying $400,000, the company was able to further extend their deadline. By the end of May, The Tennessean reported that the deadline had been extended a total of seven times, leading to increasing doubt on whether the facility would be renovated. In July, the company defaulted on their purchase, and by August, Dover Motorsports opted to reopen the sale of the track.

==== Partial sale to Panattoni ====
On August 25, 2016, Dover Motorsports announced the sale of the property to Panattoni, a California-based development company for $44.7 million. The company stated that they planned to redevelop the facility and rezone the area into a "logistics and distribution park", with the company initially retaining the track. However, by late 2017, the company sent concept plans to instead purchase the land in phases. In March, a parcel spanning approximately 147 acres was finalized for a price of $5.1 million, with hopes to build an industrial park. The next year, in July, Panattoni bought another parcel of around 132 acres for $6.37 million. By November of that year, the industrial park was opened as the Speedway Industrial Park. Discussion about the track being revitalized for racing was denied by Panattoni, with the decision to resume motorsports events at the track seen as highly unlikely. In December 2019, Woody reported that Speedway Motorsports, LLC (SMI) CEO Marcus Smith initially displayed interest of buying the track, but instead decided to pursue the Fairgrounds.

=== Resurgence, Speedway Motorsports buyout ===
In early 2020, NASCAR Cup Series drivers, such as Clint Bowyer and Chase Elliott, began calling for the series' return to the Nashville area. However, they called for the series to race at the Nashville Fairgrounds Speedway due to its closeness to the Nashville metropolitan area compared to the Nashville Superspeedway. In June of that year, Dover Motorsports announced that the company planned to hold future NASCAR Cup Series races at the track by the next year, reopening the track. The decision was seen as a surprise by local Nashville media, as while the facility could be repaired within a year, the location of the track to the Nashville area made it less desirable than the Fairgrounds. However, due to simpler approval processes to resume racing at the Nashville Superspeedway, Dover Motorsports opted to choose it over the Fairgrounds. According to McGlynn, renovating the facility would cost an estimated $8–10 million. After an inspection that deemed the track in "phenomenal shape", in August, Dover Motorsports appointed Erik Moses to run the track. The facility was able to hold its first large-scale events in November, along with gaining confirmation of scheduled dates for its NASCAR events in 2021. The next month, Dover Motorsports rebranded the facility. The first Cup Series race was run at the track on June 20, with Kyle Larson winning the event.

In late 2021, track ownership changed hands when SMI bought out Dover Motorsports for a total of $131.5 million. The next year, on November 15, Moses stepped down from his position as general manager to become the CEO of the Fiesta Bowl. Two weeks later, the track appointed its vice president of events and operations, Matt Greci, to fill in the position. In 2023, during the 2023 Ally 400, the track drew complaints from driver Ryan Blaney, who crashed during the race, hitting the track's inside barrier in the accident. The inside barrier had no SAFER barrier, a safety addition added to track walls widely implemented after the death of Dale Earnhardt. He later described the impact as the "hardest [hit] of my life", advocating for the addition of a SAFER barrier. The accident caused renewed discussion over the safety of the Next Gen car NASCAR had been using since 2022, which had seen multiple injuries within its first year, along with further criticism from NASCAR senior vice president of competition Elton Sawyer for the lack of a proper barrier.

== Events ==
=== Racing ===
==== NASCAR ====
The track hosts one NASCAR weekend annually. When it first opened, the NASCAR O'Reilly Auto Parts Series' Sports Illustrated Resorts 250 and the NASCAR Truck Series' Allegiance 200 were held there from 2001 to 2011. In 2021, both races returned, along with the addition of the NASCAR Cup Series' Cracker Barrel 400.

==== IndyCar ====
The track announced its first Indy Racing League races in June 2000, with the inaugural iteration of the event taking place on July 21, 2001. The event lasted until 2008; although event organizers entered negotiations to renew for the 2009 season, by August 2008, negotiations had broken down, failing to renew their contract. In 2024, despite successful runnings of the Music City Grand Prix that had taken place on a street course in downtown Nashville since 2021, the IndyCar Series opted to change their location for the race to the Nashville Superspeedway after it was discovered that their course layout for 2024 would interfere with construction at the New Nissan Stadium, which was near the street course.

== Lap records ==
=== Race lap records ===
As of May 2026, the fastest official race lap records at Nashville Superspeedway are listed as:

| Category | Time | Driver | Vehicle | Event |
Tri-Oval (2001–present): 1.330 mi (2.140 km)
| IndyCar | 0:22.9685 | Sam Hornish Jr. | Dallara IR-02 | 2003 Firestone Indy 200 |
| Indy NXT | 0:25.7855 | Jordan Missig | Dallara IL-15 | 2025 Indy NXT by Firestone Music City Grand Prix |
| NASCAR Cup | 0:29.663 | Denny Hamlin | Toyota Camry XSE Next Gen | 2025 Cracker Barrel 400 |
| NASCAR Truck | 0:29.794 | Layne Riggs | Ford F-150 | 2026 Allegiance 200 |
| NASCAR Xfinity | 0:30.792 | Justin Allgaier | Chevrolet SS | 2025 Tennessee Lottery 250 |
