= William Marshall McCarthy =

American banker politician (1840–1899)

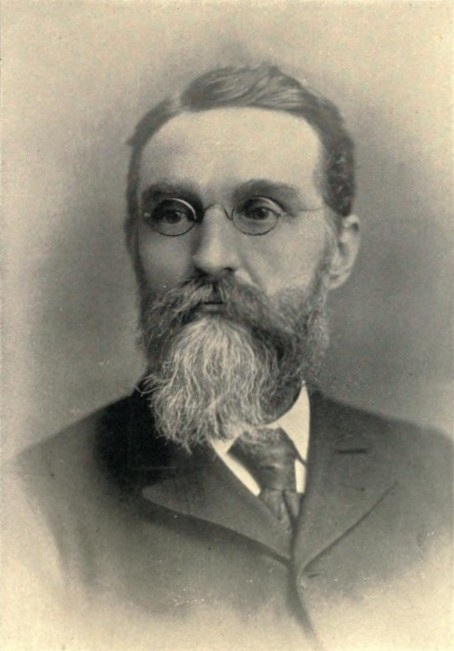
William M. McCarthy

William Marshall McCarthy (August 25, 1840 – September 13, 1899) was an American banker and politician. He served as the Mayor of Nashville, Tennessee from 1895 to 1897.

== Biography ==
McCarthy was born on August 25, 1840, in Warren County, Georgia. He moved to Nashville and worked in the banking industry.

McCarthy served as Mayor of Nashville from 1895 to 1897. He was a member of the American Protective Association, an anti-Catholic organization, and a Knight Templar in the Freemasons.

He was married to Hettie McCarthy and they had six daughters, Mollie, Madeline, Hettie, Lillie, Ordalia and Maggie, and two sons, Willie and Henry. McCarthy died on September 13, 1899. He is buried at Mount Olivet Cemetery.

Political offices
| Preceded by George Blackmore Guild | Mayor of Nashville, Tennessee; 1895–1897 | Succeeded by Richard Houston Dudley |
