= Claiborne Hooper Phillips =

- Born: July 11, 1847; Nashville, Tennessee
- Died: September 10, 1886 (aged 39); Britton, Dakota

Claiborne Hooper Phillips (July 11, 1847 – September 10, 1886) was the mayor of Nashville from 1883 to 1886. He was a graduate of Yale University, class of 1868, and was accidentally killed on a hunting trip in 1886. He was a member of the firm of Phillips, Jackson, & Company, a grocery store. He was married on July 8, 1869 to Mary C. Gentry.

Preceded by Thomas A. Kercheval	Mayor of Nashville, Tennessee; 1883–1886	Succeeded by Thomas A. Kercheval
