= John McCormick Lea =

American politician

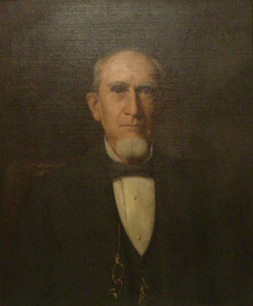

26th Mayor of Nashville, Tennessee
- In office 1849–1850
- Preceded by: Alexander Allison
- Succeeded by: John Hugh Smith

Personal details
- Born: December 25, 1818 Knoxville, Tennessee, U.S.
- Died: September 21, 1903 (aged 84) Monteagle, Tennessee, U.S.
- Resting place: Mount Olivet Cemetery, Nashville, Tennessee, U.S.
- Party: Whig
- Spouse: Elizabeth Overton (m. 1843)
- Children: 3
- Parent(s): Luke Lea; Susan Wells McCormick
- Education: University of Nashville

John McCormick Lea (December 25, 1818 – September 21, 1903) was an American Whig politician. He served as the Mayor of Nashville, Tennessee from 1849 to 1850.

== Early life ==
Lea was born in Knoxville, Tennessee on December 25, 1818. He graduated from the University of Nashville. His father was Luke Lea (1783–1851), a United States Representative from Tennessee, and his mother, Susan Wells McCormick.

== Career ==
Lea was a lawyer and a circuit judge. He served as vice-president of First American National Bank. He served as President of the Board of Trustees of the University of Nashville. From 1842 to 1845, he served as Assistant U.S. District Attorney. From 1849 to 1850, he served as Mayor of Nashville. He was part of the commission to surrender Nashville to the Union Army in February 1862. From 1888 to 1903, he served as president of the Tennessee Historical Society.

== Personal life and death ==
Lea married Elizabeth Overton in 1843. They had three sons, Overton, Robert B. and Luke Lea. He attended the First Presbyterian Church. He died in Monteagle, Tennessee on September 21, 1903, and he is buried at Mount Olivet Cemetery.

Political offices
Preceded by Alexander Allison	Mayor of Nashville, Tennessee; 1849-1850	Succeeded by John Hugh Smith
