= William Percy Sharpe =

American politician (1871–1942)

William Percy Sharpe (1871-1942) was an American Democratic politician. He served as Mayor of Nashville, Tennessee from 1922 to 1923.

== Early life ==
William Percy Sharpe was born in Anderson, South Carolina in 1871. He moved to Nashville circa 1900.

== Career ==
Sharpe sold furniture. He was the co-founder of Sharpe & Wherry, followed by Sharpe Furniture Co.

Sharpe was elected by the city council to replace Mayor Felix Zollicoffer Wilson, who was ousted. He served from November 24, 1922 to June 5, 1923. He served on the Davidson County Court from 1924 to 1930.

== Personal life and death ==
Sharpe was married to Julia Margaret Nichol. They had a son, William Percy Sharpe, Jr., and a daughter, Elizabeth Sharpe Deener. He attended the West End Methodist Church.

Sharpe died in Madison, Tennessee on November 13, 1942. He was buried in Mount Olivet Cemetery in Nashville. His house in Nashville burned down a week after his death.

Political offices
Preceded by Felix Zollicoffer Wilson	Mayor of Nashville, Tennessee; 1922-1923	Succeeded by Hilary Ewing Howse
