= William Armstrong (Tennessee politician) =

American politician

William Armstrong (1795–1847) was an American Jeffersonian Republican politician. He served as the Mayor of Nashville, Tennessee, from 1829 to 1833.

== Early life ==
Armstrong was born in 1795. His father was Col. James "Trooper" Armstrong and his mother, Susan (Wells) Armstrong.

== Career ==
Armstrong fought in the Battle of New Orleans of January 8, 1815, in the War of 1812. He served as Mayor of Nashville from 1829 to 1833. In 1835, President Andrew Jackson appointed him Superintendent of Indian Affairs in the Western Territory, where he implemented the Cherokee removal from Georgia, South Carolina, North Carolina, Tennessee, Texas, and Alabama to the Indian Territory (now known as Oklahoma). His brother, Major Francis Wells Armstrong, served in a similar capacity.

== Personal life ==
Armstrong married Nancy Irwin on July 1, 1823. They had three sons, James Trooper, David Irwin and Francis Armstrong, and four daughters, Mary Elizabeth, Margaret, Susan Wells, and Nancy Irwin. He died on June 12, 1847, at his plantation in the Choctaw Nation and was buried in Fort Coffee, Oklahoma.

Political offices
Preceded by Felix Robertson	Mayor of Nashville, Tennessee; 1829–1833	Succeeded by John Meredith Bass
