= John Hugh Smith =

American politician

John Hugh Smith (1819–1870) was an American Whig politician. He served as the mayor of Nashville, Tennessee, three times, from 1845 to 1846, from 1850 to 1853, and from 1862 to 1865.

== Early life ==
Smith was born in 1819 in Nashville. His father was John H. Smith and his mother, Maria (Combs) Smith.

== Career ==
Smith served as Mayor of Nashville from 1845 to 1846, from 1850 to 1853, and from 1862 to 1865. In 1862, he had been appointed by Tennessee Governor (and future President) Andrew Johnson to replace Richard Boone Cheatham, who was arrested.

After his retirement in 1865, Smith shot at a policeman called Brown in Nashville.

== Personal life and death ==
Smith was never married. He died on July 7, 1870, in Nashville, and he is buried in the Mount Olivet Cemetery.

Political offices
Preceded by Powhatan W. Maxey	Mayor of Nashville, Tennessee; 1845–1846	Succeeded by John A. Goodlett
Preceded by John McCormick Lea	Mayor of Nashville, Tennessee; 1850–1853	Succeeded by Williamson Hartley Horn
Preceded by Richard Boone Cheatham	Mayor of Nashville, Tennessee; 1862–1865	Succeeded by William Matt Brown
