= William Matt Brown =

American politician (1815–1885)

William Matt Brown (September 15, 1815 – September 12, 1885) was an American Whig politician. He served as the mayor of Nashville, Tennessee, from 1865 to 1867.

== Biography ==
=== Early life ===
He was born on September 15, 1815, in Franklin County, Kentucky.

=== Career ===
He served as mayor of Nashville from 1865 to 1867. He believed the 1867 election was fraudulent, and was forced from the courthouse by armed federal soldiers, declaring "I want it understood, gentlemen, that I yield to the bayonet and that alone."

=== Personal life ===
He married Mary Jane Morton in 1844. They had eight children, four of whom died infancy. Their four surviving children were William Matt Jr., Mrs. Carrie Rather, Mary Ellis Brown and Jeannie Brown. He died on September 12, 1885, at his house on South Summer Street in Nashville.

Political offices
Preceded by John Hugh Smith	Mayor of Nashville, Tennessee; 1865–1867	Succeeded by Augustus E. Alden
