= James Marshall Head =

American politician

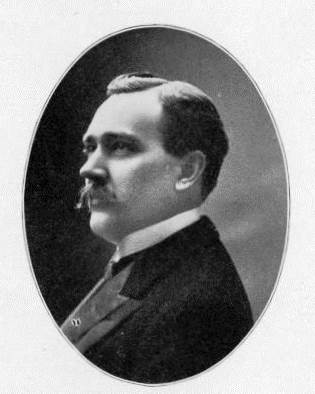
James M. Head Jr., c. 1902

James Marshall Head Jr. (1855–1930) was an American politician in the Democratic Party. He served as the Mayor of Nashville, Tennessee for two successive terms, 1900 to 1904, during which he created many of the city's public parks. In 1903, Head was mentioned by William Jennings Bryan as a possible Democratic candidate for President of the United States. He was editor of a newspaper called The Nashville American and served on the Democratic National Committee. He was president of the League of American Municipalities and was an orator and debater on the form of city government in the U.S., favoring a mayor and city council system rather than government by commissioners. After serving as Nashville mayor, Head moved to Boston where he practiced law and became vice-president of Warren Brothers Company, a road-building business.

== Early life ==
Head was born on July 25, 1855, in Sumner County, Tennessee, just north of Nashville, about six miles out of Gallatin on Scottsville Pike. His father was Dr. James M. Head Sr., a physician who served in the Tennessee Legislature in 1861 and also served in the American Civil War as a surgeon in the Thirty-fourth Tennessee Regiment. Dr. Head was captured at Fort Donelson held prisoner at Camp Chase until near the end of the war. The junior Head received his early education in Gallatin; he then read law for two years with John J. Vertrees. (Note: In 1916, Vertrees addressed the Tennessee Democratic Convention on the evils of women suffrage. A year later, Vertrees' wife Virginia became the first president of the "Tennessee Association Opposed to Woman Suffrage.) He attended Harvard Law School and graduated in 1876. At age 21, he returned to Gallatin to begin his law practice with S. F. Wilson.

== Career ==
Head was elected to the Tennessee Legislature in 1880 and re-elected in 1882. While there, he was a member of a committee to draft the State debt adjustment. He moved to Nashville, just 30 miles southwest of Gallatin, in 1880 and partnered with Col. S.A. Champion forming the law firm of Champion and Head. Head became editor-in-chief of The Nashville American, a newspaper published from 1894 to 1910. It merged with the Nashville Tennessean in 1907. In the publication, Head espoused a policy advocating the free coinage of silver and a tariff for revenue only. (Note: A tariff imposed on imports, sufficient to pay the cost of running the government, but no higher.) He was elected Mayor of Nashville in October, 1899, which necessitated his dissolving his law partnership. He served a second term as mayor, running unopposed. He held the office from 1900 to 1904. Head was a member of the Democratic National Committee from 1896 to 1904. In this role, he once requested changing the location of the Democratic National Convention, scheduled for Kansas City in 1900, to another city because the Tennessee Delegation could not get rooms cheaper than five dollars per day. He declared this rate "out of all reason". Head was elected President of the League of American Municipalities at its annual meeting in Baltimore in 1903. Head, along with then Tennessee Governor James B. Frazier, addressed the National Negro Business League's annual meeting held at the Tennessee statehouse in 1903. After Head and Frazier's opening remarks, Booker T. Washington, the league's president made his annual address.

== Creation of Nashville city parks ==
While Mayor, Head created the Nashville Parks Board in 1901. The plan was to create several neighborhood parks and four larger parks of about 50 acres (0.078 mi^{2}), one built in each quadrant of town. The city did not have the funds. Head learned that Indianapolis had financed its parks by taking a percentage of fare receipts from streetcar companies as part of their franchises. After a complex series of events, he ended up negotiating a deal whereby Nashville businessman Percy Warner was allowed to form a new company, the Nashville Railway and Light Company, which would operate the streetcar system and supply its electric power. As part of the negotiation, the city received a prime site of 72 acres (0.113 mi^{2}) where the Tennessee Centennial Exposition had been held in 1897, now known as Centennial Park.

== William Jennings Bryan ==
In 1903, Head was mentioned by William Jennings Bryan as a possible presidential candidate. Head and Bryan were fast friends, but that was not always the case. At the Democratic Convention in 1904, Head was on the credentials committee, who recommended the seating of the Roger Sullivan delegation from Illinois which William Jennings Bryan opposed. This developed into a battle in which oratory was the order of the day. Head spoke in favor of adoption of the committee's recommendation, followed by a speech to the contrary by Bryan which, according to the press, "swayed the galleries with its eloquence"; however, when Head closed the argument with a rebuttal, Bryan lost the vote. Bryan would not speak to Head after the debate, but the animosity was short-lived. Historian John Allison described Head thus: "Although a partisan on all questions pertaining to public policy he has hosts of Republican friends because of his genial disposition and general good-fellowship".

== Views on municipal government ==
At age 49 (1904) Head relocated from Nashville to Boston where he resumed the practice of law. During this time he became a speaker and debater on the subject of municipal government. Head favored government by mayor and city council as opposed to government by commission (board of directors or "selectmen"). He debated the matter with Charles W. Eliot, then president of Harvard University and with George Kibbe Turner of McClure's Magazine, both of whom favored the opposite governing method. Their presentations were made before the Economic Club of Boston on January 11, 1907. Others on the program were William H. Lincoln (club president), Harvey S. Chase (municipal accountant), and Arthur Warren, (of the Boston Herald). Head's presentation was punctuated with occasions of humor and received with many instances of applause. Head became vice-president of Warren Brothers Company, one of the largest paving and road-building companies in the U.S. The Boston-based company patented a type of asphalt road surface material.

== Personal life ==
Head was married to Minnie C. Cherry on June 30, 1885. They lived on Eighth Avenue South in Nashville, in a home that was built on the former Burton property. It was built by Head's father-in-law, William C. Cherry in 1884. Cherry was head of the firm of Cherry, Morrow and Company, manufacturers of the "Tennessee Wagon". (Note: The "Tennessee Wagon" was a farm wagon manufactured in the 1870s by Cherry. His company became a lessee of the Tennessee State Penitentiary and used prison labor to make about 60 wagons a day. Prison labor made the wagons cheaper than the competition; the wagons were sold in every southern state.) On Cherry's death the property was passed to his wife and children; eventually, the Heads lived there for about 20 years. They had three children: James Marshall Head III, Mrs. Ned Conway, and Mrs. Charles Brooks. After the Heads moved to Boston, the property was sold to the "Presbyterian Bible Training School" in 1910.

== Sudden death ==
Head died suddenly at age 74 while attending a dinner for Democratic Mayors at Boston's Statler Hotel (Note: The Statler was sold in 1976 and renamed "Boston Park Plaza".) on March 31, 1930. The dinner was sponsored by the Boston Democratic City Committee, the Alfred E. Smith League of Massachusetts and the Democratic Women Voters. The event included about 1500 people and Head was seated near the stage of the main ballroom when he slumped forward in his chair before the program had started. He was assisted to an ante-room by those nearby and was pronounced dead by Dr. John H.F. Connor, (Note: John H. F. Connor was a physician who served in the Massachusetts Senate in 1919. He sponsored a petition requiring the use of sanitary cuspidors and other receptacles.) who happened to be an attendee.

== Notes ==
Political offices
Preceded by Richard Houston Dudley	Mayor of Nashville, Tennessee; 1900-1904	Succeeded by Albert Smiley Williams
