= Henry Hollingsworth =

American politician

Henry Hollingsworth (1808–1855) was a Democratic politician. He served as the Mayor of Nashville, Tennessee, from 1837 to 1839.

== Early life ==
Hollingsworth was born on August 8, 1808, in Nelson County, Virginia. His parents were William Hollingsworth and Frances Wright-Hollingsworth. He had a twin sister named Mary Ann, and they were likely the only children of their parents. Coming from modest beginnings, Hollingsworth had a humble upbringing, and throughout his early life until adulthood, he supported himself through manual labor. In 1833, he relocated to Nashville.

== Career ==
After relocating, he became a candidate for night watch. He later commenced the study of law in the office of attorney William L. Brown, Esq and later admitted to the bar.

In 1836 he served with honor in the Seminole Wars. as First Lieutenant in Capt. Battle's company of mounted men.

From 1837 through 1839, he served as the Democratic Mayor of Nashville. He presided over the Mayor's Court and administered the city's affairs.

In 1841 he was nominated by the Democratic party as a candidate for the State Senate, and received a vote beyond his party strength.

== Personal life and death ==
On April 29, 1837, in the District of Columbia, Hollingsworth married Eliza O’Brien, who died in May 1939 at the age of 21. They had one son, Lucian B Hollingsworth, born in May 1838 in Nashville, Tennessee.

On July 25, 1843, in Davidson County, Tennessee he remarried a widow, Mrs. Anna Bell Dozier Stump. They had four children during their marriage:

- Edna Hollingsworth was born June 24, 1844, in Davidson, Tennessee.
- Nancy "Nannie" Hollingsworth was born on October 23, 1845, in Nashville, Tennessee.
- Mary Hollingsworth was born in 1847 in Davidson, Tennessee.
- Henrietta Hollingsworth was born in 1854 in Davidson, Tennessee.

Hollingsworth died on January 24, 1855, at his residence in Davidson County, Tennessee, after a lingering illness of several months.

Political offices
Preceded by William Nichol	Mayor of Nashville, Tennessee; 1837–1839	Succeeded by Charles Clay Trabue
