= George Blackmore Guild =

American politician

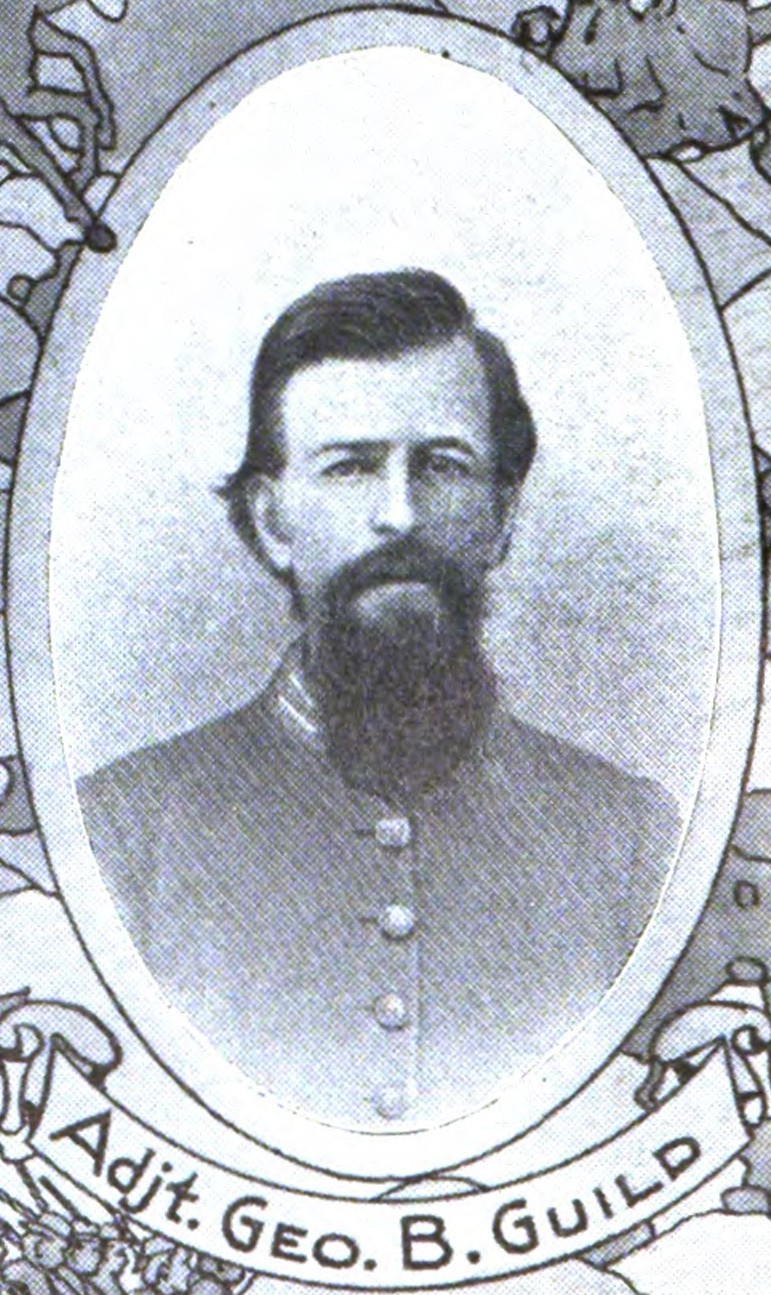

47th Mayor of Nashville, Tennessee
- In office 1891 – 1895
- Preceded by: William Litterer
- Succeeded by: William Marshall McCarthy

Personal details
- Born: April 8, 1834 Gallatin, Tennessee
- Died: April 21, 1917 (aged 83) Norfolk, Virginia
- Resting place: Mount Olivet Cemetery
- Party: Democrat
- Spouse: Georgia Thompson (m. 1861–1917)
- Children: 5
- Education: Cumberland University

Military service
- Allegiance: Confederate States of America
- Branch/service: Confederate States Army
- Years of service: 1861–1865
- Rank: Major
- Battles/wars: American Civil War

George Blackmore Guild (April 8, 1834 – April 21, 1917) was an American lawyer and Democratic politician. He served as the Mayor of Nashville, Tennessee from 1891 to 1895.

== Biography ==
He was born April 8, 1834, in Gallatin, Tennessee. He attended the University of Alabama in Tuscaloosa, Alabama for two years and transferred to Cumberland University in Lebanon, Tennessee, where he graduated as a valedictorian. He was a member of the Beta Theta Pi fraternity. He was admitted to the bar and practiced law in Gallatin.

He fought in the Confederate States Army during the American Civil War of 1861–1865. He served six months in J. H. Morgan's cavalry and then joined the 4th Tennessee Cavalry. He was promoted to major in May 1863.

After the war, he served in the Tennessee House of Representatives from 1871 to 1873. He moved his law practice to Nashville in 1872. He served as Mayor of Nashville from 1891 to 1895, being elected in 1891 and reelected in 1893. From 1897 to 1899, he represented Davidson County in the Tennessee State Senate. He continued to practice law in Nashville until 1913.

He was married on March 5, 1861, to Georgia Thompson. They had five children, Josephus Conn (1862–1907), William Thompson (1866–1895), Walter Keeble (1868–1872), George Mullins, and Maria (Westbrook) (1873–1954). He died in Norfolk, Virginia on April 21, 1917, and was buried at Mount Olivet Cemetery in Nashville.

Political offices
Preceded by William Litterer	Mayor of Nashville, Tennessee; 1891–1895	Succeeded by William Marshall McCarthy
