= John A. Goodlett =

American politician

John A. Goodlett was an American politician. He served as the Mayor of Nashville, Tennessee from 1846 to 1847.

== Biography ==
His father was Dr. Adam Gibb Goodlett, a physician, surgeon and planter, and his mother, Charlotte Phanuel Campbell. His siblings were Michael C. Goodlett, George Washington Goodlett, James Goodlett and William Goodlett. His brother Michael was the husband of Caroline Meriwether Goodlett, who founded the United Daughters of the Confederacy.

He served as Mayor of Nashville from 1846 to 1847.

Political offices
Preceded by John Hugh Smith	Mayor of Nashville, Tennessee; 1846-1847	Succeeded by Alexander Allison
