= Thomas L. Cummings Sr. =

American politician

Thomas L. Cummings Sr. (May 1, 1891 – March 29, 1968) the mayor of Nashville, Tennessee from 1938 to 1951.

== Early life ==
Cummings was born on a farm near McMinnville, Tennessee, on May 1, 1891. His father, William Martin Cummings, was a farmer. He graduated from the Vanderbilt University Law School.

== Career ==
Cummings began his career as a farmer. He was the owner of a grocery store, and he became a lawyer. He served as a member of the Tennessee Senate in 1927 and 1937.

Cummings was elected as the mayor of Nashville in 1938. He was reelected in 1939, 1943 and 1947.

In 1939, Cummings appointed black banker James Carroll Napier to the Nashville Housing Authority. In 1940, he sent a police honor guard to Napier's funeral. In May 1948, he announced the hiring of seven black policemen to join the Nashville police force. He hastened to add they would only work in black neighborhoods, arguing they would be more qualified to keep the order in black neighborhoods. They shared only one patrol car and weren't allowed to arrest white Nashvillians.

== Personal life, death and legacy ==
Cummings married Ella Lee Connell of White House, Tennessee. They had a son, Thomas L. Cummings Jr., who founded Cummings Signs, a manufacturer of corporate brand signs for the Ford Motor Company, Chrysler, KFC, Captain D's, the Chevron Corporation, Conoco, Holiday Inn and Bank of America. Their daughter, Patsy, married Mr Clem Schonhoff of Knoxville, Tennessee. Cummings was a Freemason.

Cummings died on March 29, 1968, in Nashville.

Political offices
Preceded by Hilary Ewing Howse	Mayor of Nashville, Tennessee; 1938–1951	Succeeded by Ben West
