= Thomas Owen Morris =

American politician (1845–1924)

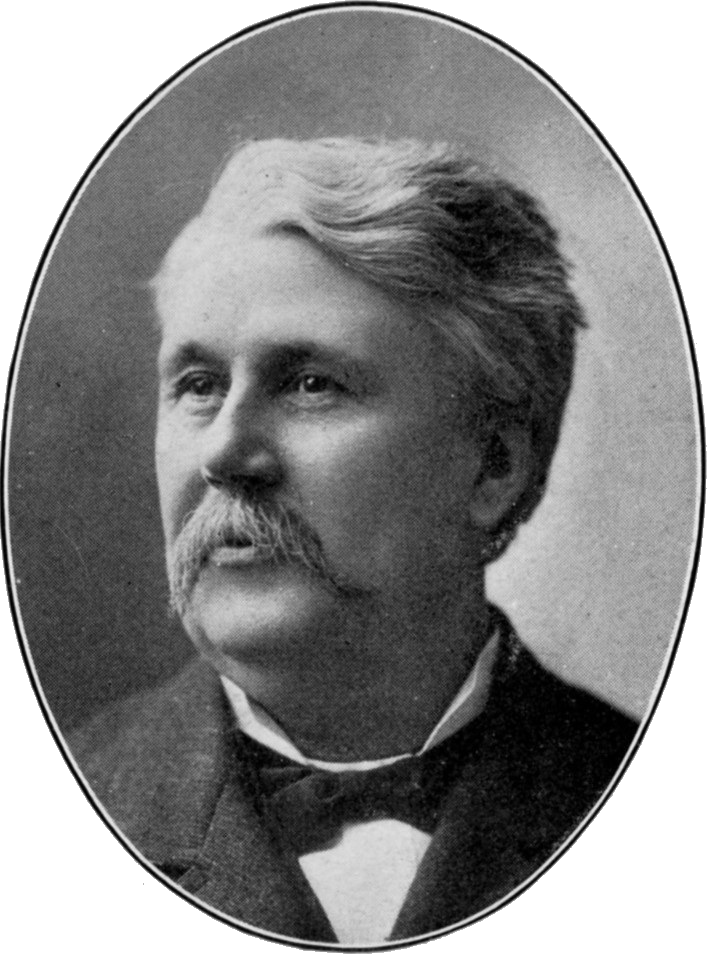

Mayor of Nashville, Tennessee
- In office 1906–1908
- Preceded by: Albert Smiley Williams
- Succeeded by: James Stephens Brown

Personal details
- Born: August 2, 1845 Sumner County, Tennessee, U.S.
- Died: November 8, 1924 (aged 79) Nashville, Tennessee, U.S.
- Resting place: Mount Olivet Cemetery, Nashville, Tennessee, U.S.
- Party: Democratic
- Spouse: Mary Snow (m. 1866)
- Children: 5
- Profession: Politician

Thomas Owen Morris (August 2, 1845 – November 8, 1924) was an American Democratic politician. He was the mayor of Nashville, Tennessee from 1906 to 1908.

== Early life ==
Morris was born in Sumner County, Tennessee on August 2, 1845.

== Career ==
Morris worked in the wholesale produce industry, eventually becoming a business owner in Nashville. He represented Davidson County in the Tennessee House of Representatives from 1889 to 1891. Morris also served as a justice of the peace and as chairman of the city board of education.

Morris served as Mayor of Nashville from 1906 to 1908. He was a member of the Knights Templar.

== Personal life and death ==
Morris was married in Nashville on May 27, 1866 to Mary Snow. They had five children: Henry Snow, Edwin Lanier, Thomas Owen, Jr., Kitty and Kendrick J. Morris. He died in Nashville on November 8, 1924. He is buried at Mount Olivet Cemetery in Nashville.

Political offices
Preceded by Albert Smiley Williams	Mayor of Nashville, Tennessee; 1906-1908	Succeeded by James Stephens Brown
