= William Litterer =

American politician

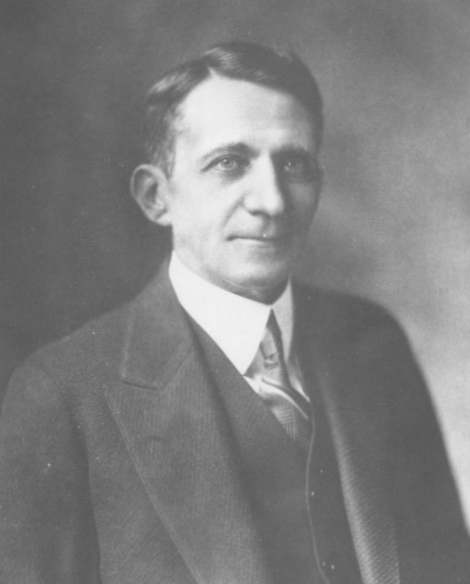
- Born: August 24, 1834; Germany
- Died: December 1917 (aged 83)
- Resting place: Mount Olivet Cemetery
- Occupations: Pilot; Politician
- Parent: Charles A. Litterer

William Litterer (1834–1917) was an American Democratic politician. He served as the Mayor of Nashville, Tennessee, from 1890 to 1891.

== Early life ==
Litterer was born in Germany on August 24, 1834. His father, Charles A. Litterer, taught at Heidelberg University. His brother was Charles A. Litterer. They came to the United States in 1847 with their parents and settled in Nashville in 1855.

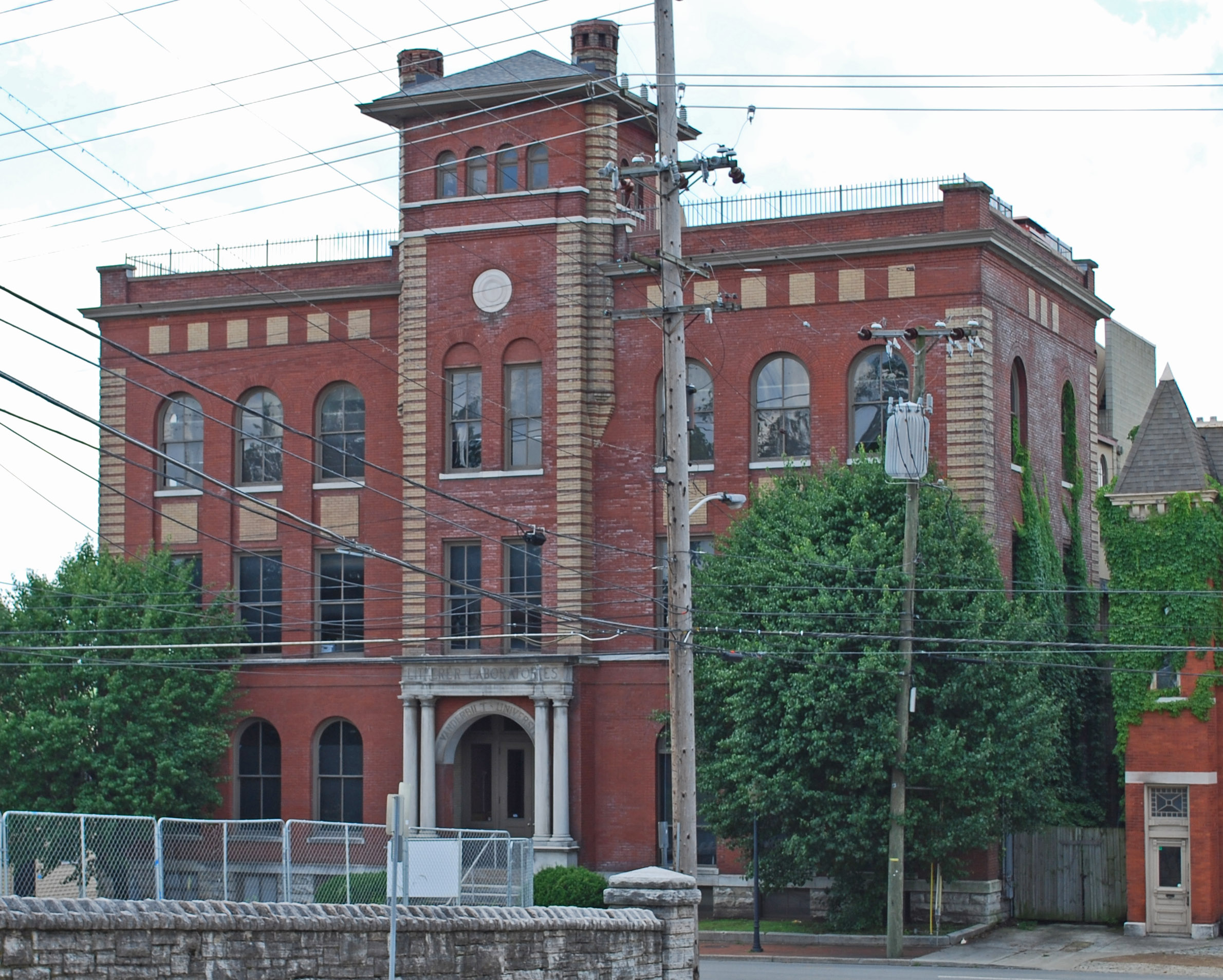
Litterer Laboratory

== Career ==
Litterer worked as a maritime pilot on the Cumberland River.

Litterer became Mayor pro tem after Mayor Charles P. McCarver resigned in October 1890. On February 10, 1891, he was elected Mayor, to complete the unexpired term of McCarver. As a result, he served as Mayor from 1890 to 1891.

In 1915, Litterer purchased the building of the University of Nashville Medical Department called the Litterer Laboratory (on the National Register of Historic Places since January 9, 1978) and donated it to Vanderbilt University.

== Death ==
Litterer died in December 1917. He is buried at Mount Olivet Cemetery in Nashville.

Political offices
Preceded by Charles P. McCarver	Mayor of Nashville, Tennessee; 1890-1891	Succeeded by George Blackmore Guild
