= James Stephens Brown =

American politician (1858–1946)

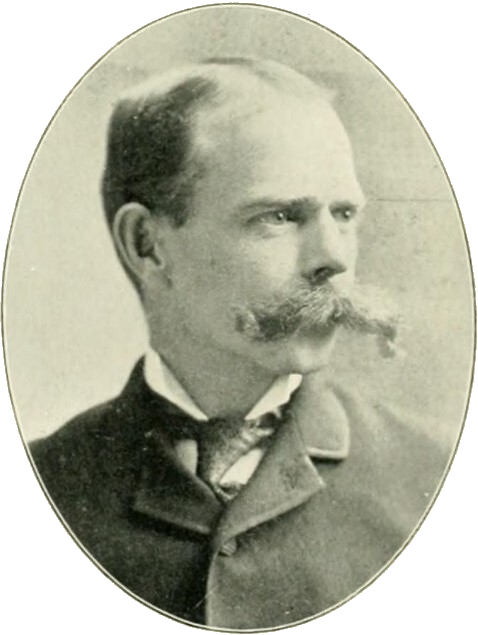
James S. Brown

James Stephen Brown Jr. (July 6, 1858 – January 6, 1946) was an American Democratic politician. He served as the Mayor of Nashville, Tennessee, from 1906 to 1910.

== Early life ==
Brown was born in Paris, Tennessee on July 6, 1858. He attended the University of Tennessee before entering the United States Naval Academy in September 1875. Brown graduated from the Naval Academy in 1880.

== Career ==
Brown served aboard USS Tennessee and USS Lancaster. He was part of the U.S. delegation at the coronation of Tsar Alexander III of Russia in May 1883.

Brown resigned his commission as an ensign in February 1889 and became a lawyer in Nashville, joining the firm of Champion, Head, and Brown.

During the Spanish–American War, Brown returned to active duty as a lieutenant junior grade from May to October 1898.

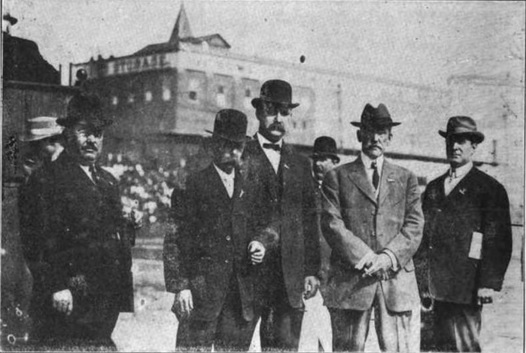
Brown is second from left.

Brown served as Mayor of Nashville from 1906 to 1910. He subsequently moved to Memphis.

== Personal life and death ==
Brown was married to Madeline Pattie McComb on November 6, 1895. They had three children: James S. Brown, III, Worthington Brown, and Berta Brown Radford. He was Presbyterian.

Brown died on January 6, 1946, at his home in Memphis. He was buried in Mount Olivet Cemetery in Nashville.

Political offices
Preceded by Thomas Owen Morris	Mayor of Nashville, Tennessee; 1908–1909	Succeeded by Hilary Ewing Howse
