= Kindred Jenkins Morris =

American politician

Kindred Jenkins Morris (1819-1884) was an American Democratic politician. He served as the Mayor of Nashville, Tennessee from 1869 to 1871.

== Early life ==
Morris was born in December 1819 in Davidson County, Tennessee.

== Career ==
Morris worked for the firm Morris and Stratton for thirty-three years. He served as Mayor of Nashville from 1869 to 1871.

== Personal life and death ==
Morris was married to Jane Morris. They had a son, Walter M. Morris, who died by accident while loading his gun at the age of seventeen. He died in 1884, and he is buried in Mount Olivet Cemetery in Nashville.

Political offices
Preceded by John Meredith Bass	Mayor of Nashville, Tennessee; 1869-1871	Succeeded by Thomas A. Kercheval
