= List of mayors of Nashville, Tennessee =

Mayor of Nashville
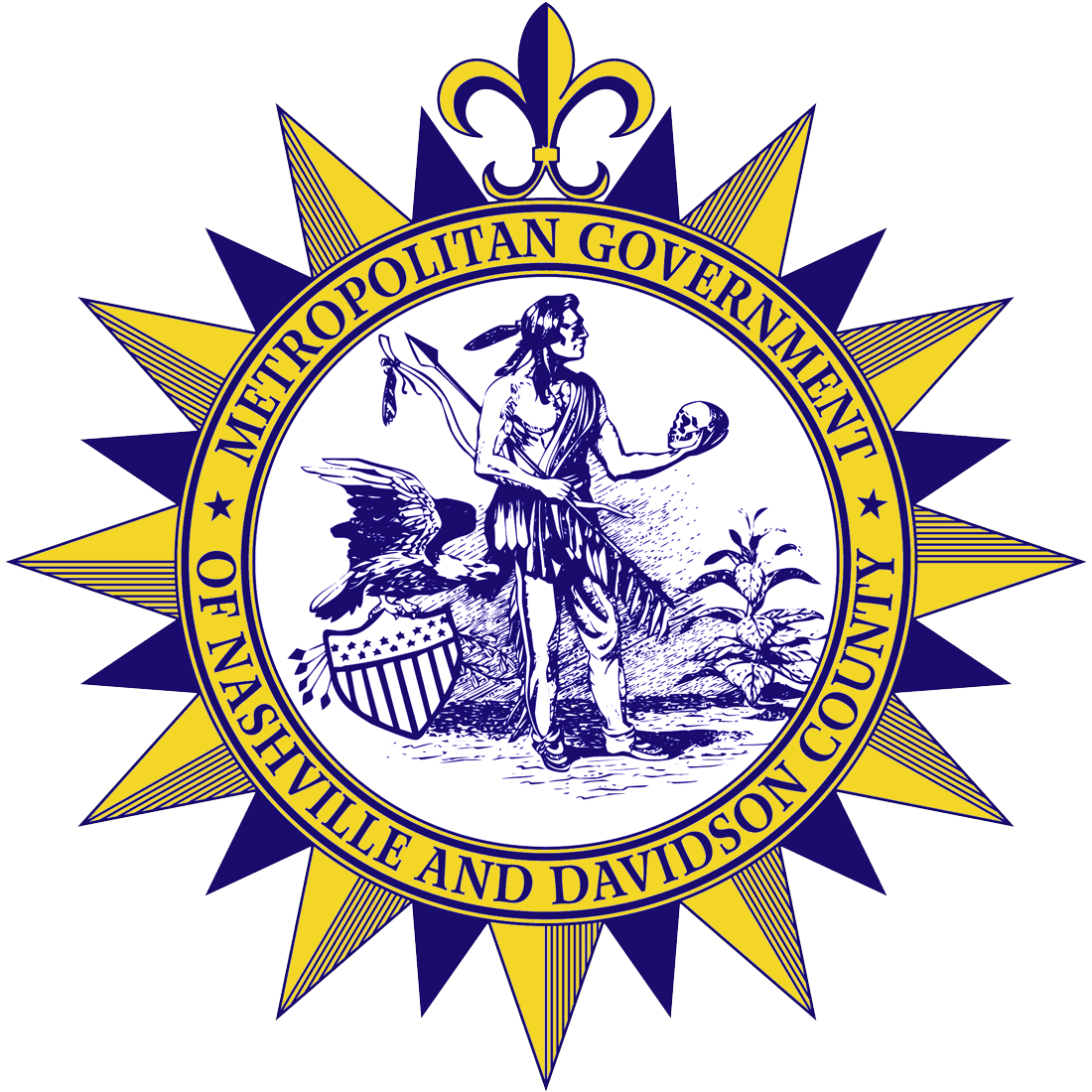
- Seal of the Metropolitan Government of Nashville and Davidson County

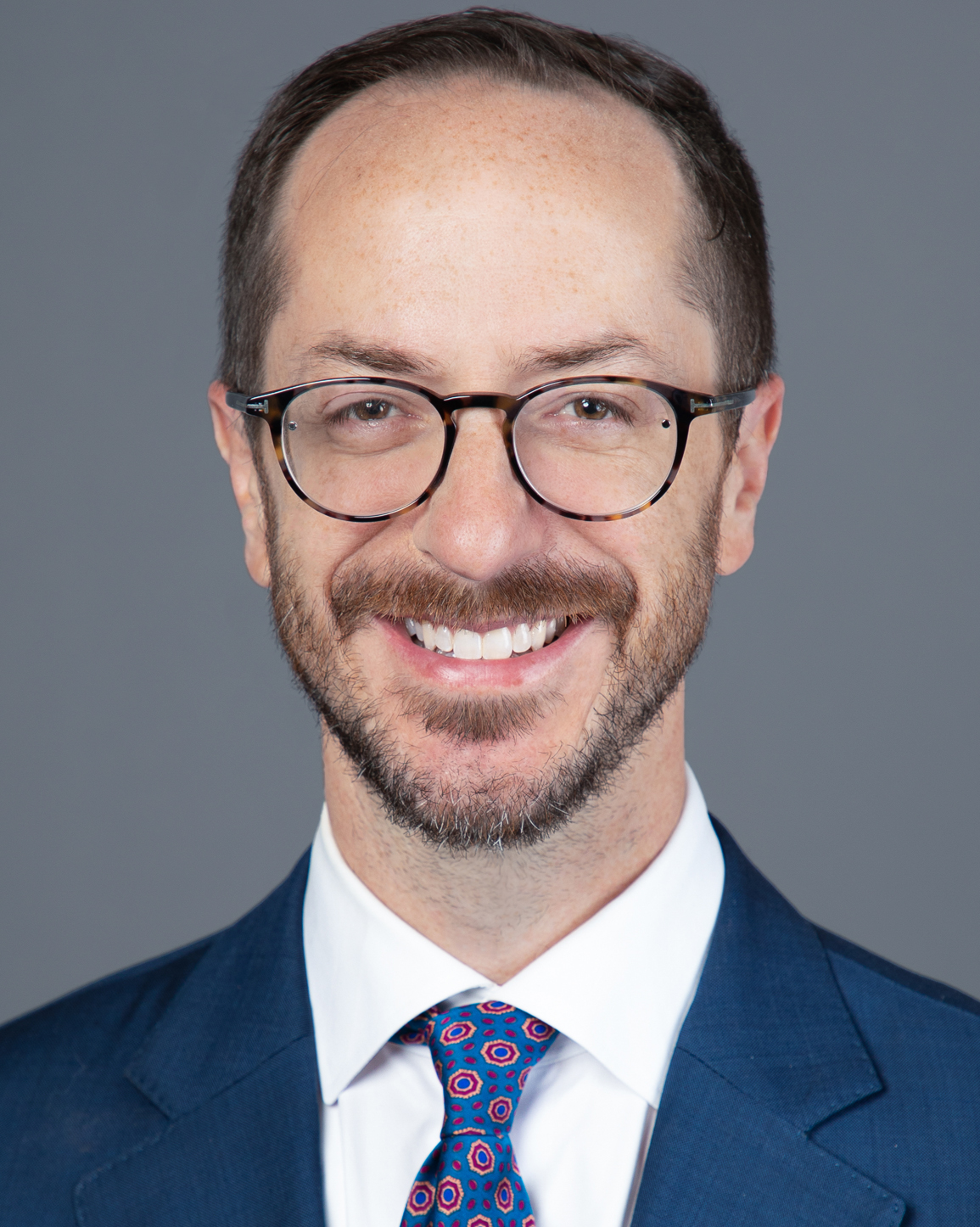
- Incumbent; Freddie O'Connell since September 25, 2023
- Term length: 4 years
- Inaugural holder: Beverly Briley
- Formation: 1963
- Succession: Vice mayor of Nashville
- Salary: $180,000
- Website: Official website

The Mayor of Nashville is the chief executive of the government of Nashville, Tennessee. The current mayor is Freddie O'Connell. Each mayor serves a term of four years, with a limit of two consecutive terms, unless this is interrupted by a legal mechanism, such as a recall election.

== Mayors of the City of Nashville ==
The following is a list of the mayors of Nashville before it had a consolidated metropolitan government:

=== Pre-Civil War ===
Mayor	Term
Joseph Coleman	1806–1809
Benjamin J. Bradford	1809–1811
William Tait	1811–1814
Joseph Thorpe Elliston	1814–1817
Stephen Cantrell Jr.	1817–1817
Felix Robertson	1818–1819
Thomas Crutcher	1819–1820
James Condon	1820–1821
John Patton Erwin	1821–1822
Robert Brownlee Currey	1822–1824
Randal McGavock	1824–1825
Wilkins F. Tannehill	1825–1827
Felix Robertson	1827–1829
William Armstrong	1829–1833
John Meredith Bass	1833–1834
John Patton Erwin	1834–1835
William Nichol	1835–1837
Henry Hollingsworth	1837–1839
Charles Clay Trabue	1839–1841
Samuel Van Dyke Stout	1841–1842
Thomas B. Coleman	1842–1843
Powhatan W. Maxey	1843–1845
John Hugh Smith	1845–1846
John A. Goodlett	1846–1847
Alexander Allison	1847–1849
John McCormick Lea	1849–1850
John Hugh Smith	1850–1853
Williamson Hartley Horn	1853–1854
William Booker Shapard	1854–1854
Robert Bell Castleman	1854–1856
Andrew Anderson	1856–1857
John A. McEwen	1857–1858
Randal William McGavock	1858–1859
Samuel N. Hollingsworth	1859–1860

=== Civil War and Reconstruction ===
Mayor	Term
Richard Boone Cheatham	1860–1862
John Hugh Smith	1862–1865
William Matt Brown	1865–1867
Augustus E. Alden	1867–1869
John Meredith Bass	1869–1869
Kindred Jenkins Morris	1869–1871
Thomas A. Kercheval	1871–1874
Morton Boyte Howell	1874–1875

=== Post-Reconstruction ===
Mayor	Term
Thomas A. Kercheval	1875–1883
Claiborne Hooper Phillips	1883–1886
Thomas A. Kercheval	1886–1888
Charles P. McCarver	1888–1890
William Litterer	1890–1891
George Blackmore Guild	1891–1895
William Marshall McCarthy	1895–1897
Richard Houston Dudley	1897–1900
James Marshall Head	1900–1904
Albert Smiley Williams	1904–1906
Thomas Owen Morris	1906–1908
James Stephens Brown	1908–1909
Hilary Ewing Howse	1909–1915
Robert Ewing	1915–1917
William Gupton	1917–1921
Felix Zollicoffer Wilson	1921–1922
William Percy Sharpe	1922–1924
Hilary Ewing Howse	1924–1938
Thomas L. Cummings, Sr.	1938–1951
Ben West	1951–1963

== Mayors of Metropolitan Nashville ==
The following is a list of the mayors of Nashville after the consolidation of the municipal government with the government of Davidson County:

Image	Mayor	Term
	Beverly Briley	1963–1975
	Richard Fulton	1975–1987
	Bill Boner	1987–1991
	Phil Bredesen	1991–1999
	Bill Purcell	1999–2007
	Karl Dean	2007–2015
	Megan Barry	2015–2018
	David Briley	2018–2019
	John Cooper	2019–2023
	Freddie O'Connell	2023–present

== See also ==
- Timeline of Nashville, Tennessee

== Bibliography ==
- Mayer N. Zald; Thomas A. Anderson (1968). "Secular Trends and Historical Contingencies in the Recruitment of Mayors: Nashville as Compared to New Haven and Chicago". Urban Affairs Review. 3. doi:10.1177/107808746800300403. S2CID 154143740.
