= Charles Clay Trabue =

American politician

- Born: August 27, 1798; Woodford County, Kentucky, U.S.
- Died: November 24, 1851 (aged 53)
- Resting place: Nashville City Cemetery
- Occupation: Politician
- Spouse: Agnes Green Woods
- Children: 9
- Parent(s): Edward Trabue; Jane Clay

Charles Clay Trabue (1798–1851) was an American banker and Whig politician. He served as a member of the Missouri House of Representatives from 1824 to 1828, and as the Mayor of Nashville, Tennessee from 1839 to 1841.

== Early life ==
Charles Clay Trabue was born in Woodford County, Kentucky on August 27, 1798. His father was Edward Trabue and his mother, Jane Clay. At the age of seventeen, he joined served as Sergeant and joined Andrew Jackson in his fight against Native Americans during the Seminole Wars.

== Career ==
Trabue arrived in Tennessee in 1818 in order to work as a clerk at the Nashville branch of the Second Bank of the United States.

Shortly after marrying in 1820, the newlywed couple moved to Missouri. In 1824, he was elected as Missouri State Representative, where he served one term, until 1828. The couple then relocated to Tennessee. In 1836, he was elected to the Nashville Board of Aldermen, and reelected in 1837. He served as Mayor of Nashville from 1839 to 1841.

== Personal life and death ==
Trabue married Agnes Green Woods on July 5, 1820. They had nine children. He attended First Baptist Church of Nashville and sat on its building committee for a new church on Fifth Avenue.

Trabue died of brain fever on November 24, 1851, and he is buried in the Nashville City Cemetery.

Political offices
Preceded by -	Member of the Missouri House of Representatives; 1824–1828	Succeeded by -
Preceded by Henry Hollingsworth	Mayor of Nashville, Tennessee; 1839–1841	Succeeded by Samuel Van Dyke Stout
