= Augustus E. Alden =

American politician

Augustus E. Alden (1837–1886) was an American Radical Republican politician. He served as the mayor of Nashville, Tennessee, from 1867 to 1868.

== Early life ==
He was born in Augusta, Maine, in 1837. His father was Col. Darius Alden and his mother, Caroline Nickerson.

== Career ==
During the American Civil War of 1861-1865, Alden served as a unionist from Minnesota and Maine.

During William Gannaway Brownlow's campaign for Governor of Tennessee in 1865, he acted as a registrar for Davidson County. Alden served as the mayor of Nashville from 1867 to 1868. Historians have argued Governor Brownlow staged Alden's Nashville Mayoral election of 1867. Others have argued he won the election thanks to African-American voters. When Mayor William Matt Brown (1865-1867) accused him of stealing the election, Governor Brownlow sent General Joseph Alexander Cooper to calm the situation down and let Alden move into his new office.

== Personal life and death ==
He married Amanda Sparling on October 19, 1871. They had no children. He died on April 23, 1886, in Seattle, Washington.

Political offices
| Preceded by William Matt Brown | Mayor of Nashville, Tennessee; 1867–1868 | Succeeded by John Meredith Bass |
