= Thomas B. Coleman =

American politician

Thomas B. Coleman (1795–1848) was an American politician, slaveholder, and freemason. He served as the Mayor of Nashville, Tennessee from 1842 to 1843.

== Early life ==
Coleman was born in 1795. His father was Joseph Coleman, and his mother was Ann M. Coleman. However, he was not related to Joseph Coleman, who served as the first Mayor of Nashville from 1806 to 1809.

== Career ==
Coleman was elected to the Nashville Board of Aldermen in 1835, and re-elected five times. He served as Mayor of Nashville from 1842 to 1843.

== Personal life and death ==
Coleman married Margaret Stewart. They had three sons, Thomas, Leroy, James, and one daughter, Mary J. Coleman. He owned ten slaves. He was a freemason. He died in December 1848, and he is buried in the Nashville City Cemetery.

Political offices
Preceded by Samuel Van Dyke Stout	Mayor of Nashville, Tennessee; 1842–1843	Succeeded by Powhatan W. Maxey
