= Middle Tennessee Mental Health Institute =

State mental hospital located in Middle Tennessee that serves 18 counties

Coordinates: 36.1064°N 86.6775°W

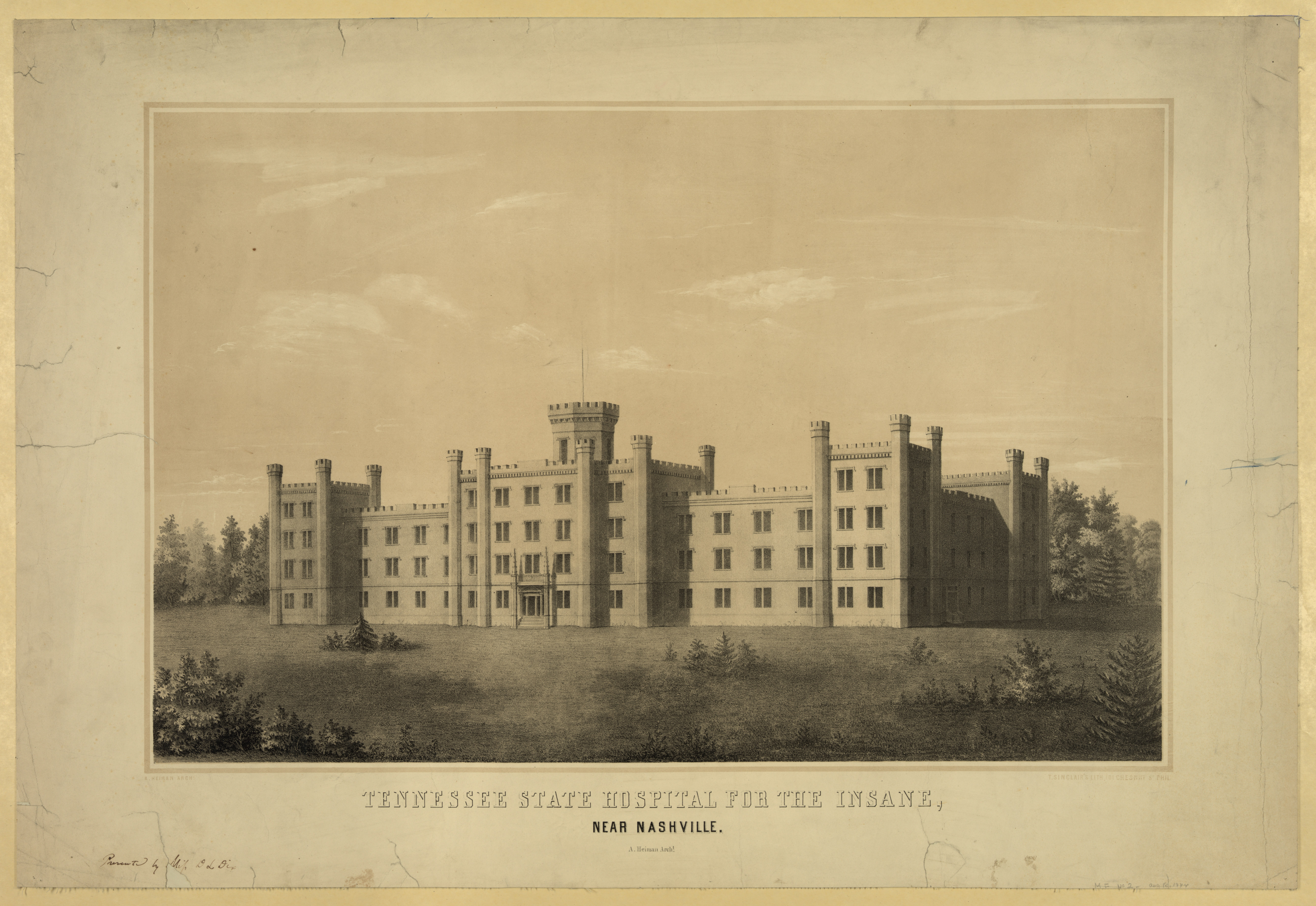

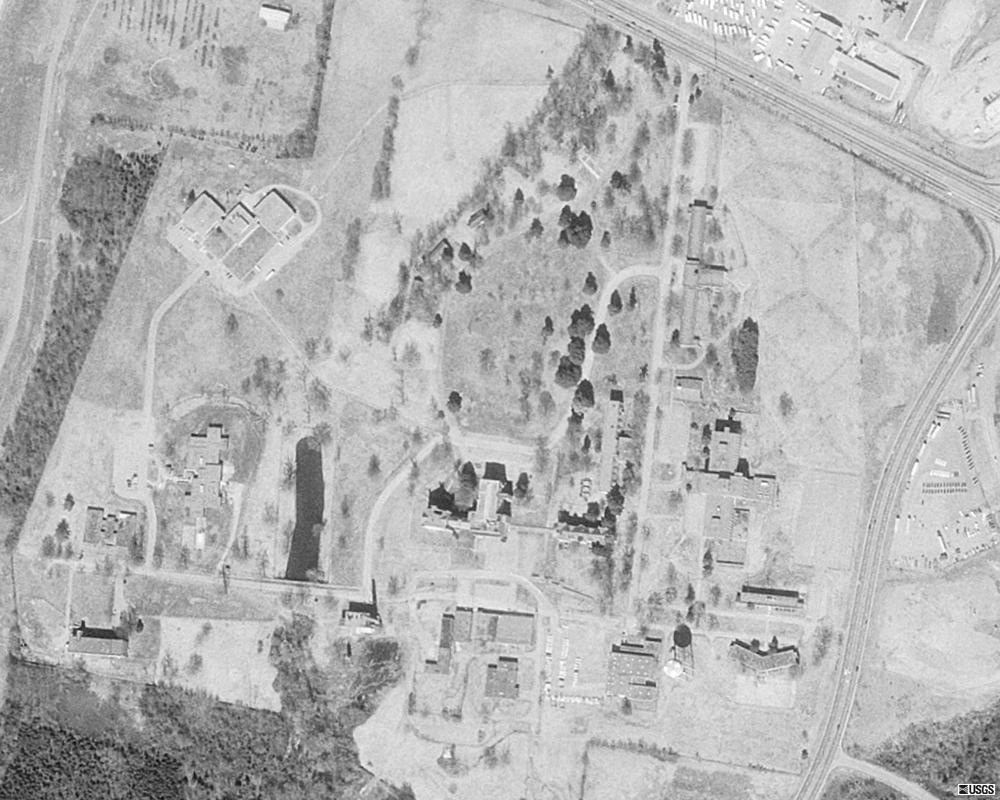
USGS aerial photo of the original hospital campus (1997)

The Middle Tennessee Mental Health Institute, originally known as the Tennessee Hospital for the Insane and later as the Central State Hospital for the Insane, was a psychiatric hospital located in Nashville, Tennessee.

== History ==
In 1845, the patient Green Grimes wrote the book A Secret Worth Knowing, extolling the hospital.

After visiting Tennessee's first mental health facility, the Tennessee Lunatic Asylum, in November 1847, Dorothea Dix urged the state legislature to replace the unfit facility. The new facility, named Central State Hospital for the Insane, opened in 1852 in southeast Nashville, Tennessee on the southwest corner of Murfreesboro Road and Donelson Pike.

In 1891, much of the building burnt down.

In 1963, the Tennessee Neuropsychiatric Institute was formed by Vanderbilt University and its research facility was located at Central State.

In 1995, the hospital moved to new facilities on Stewarts Ferry Pike. The original hospital buildings were demolished in 1999 to make way for Dell to build a large computer assembly plant.
