= Blackman, Tennessee =

- Town
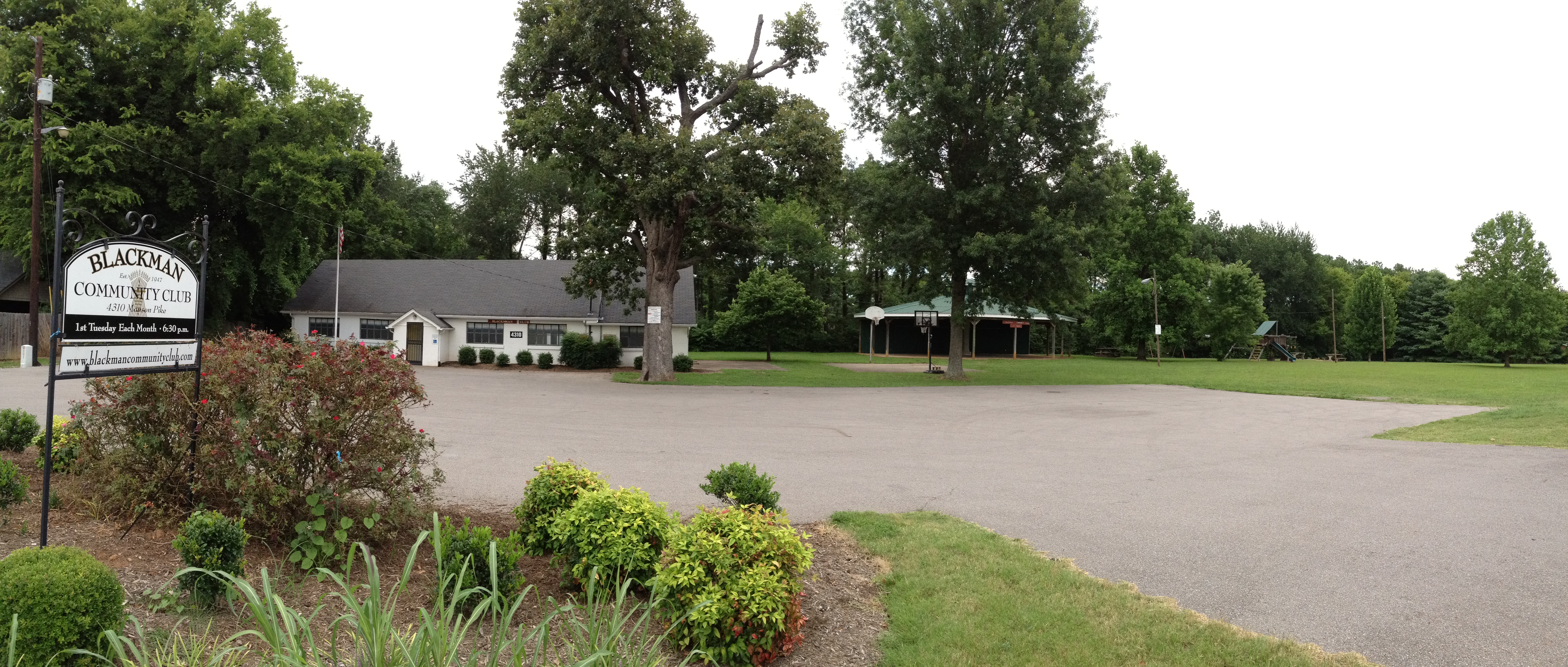
- Panoramix view of the Blackman Community Club building and grounds at Blackman, an unincorporated community in Rutherford County close to Interstate 840 near Murfreesboro, Tennessee.

- Location within Tennessee
- Coordinates: 35°52′31″N 86°29′54″W
- Country: United States
- State: Tennessee
- County: Rutherford
- Established: 1808
- Founder: Alfred Blackman
- Elevation: 600 ft (180 m)
- Time zone: UTC-6 (Town)
  - Summer (DST): UTC-5 (Town)
- Area code: 615
- GNIS feature ID: 1305271
- Website: blackmancommunityclub.com

Blackman is a Town in Rutherford County, Tennessee, located on the west side of the city of Murfreesboro. The community was founded in 1808 and was originally named Blackman's Shop. By the time of the Civil War, it had a store, doctor's offices, a school, and churches. The Blackman post office was established in 1898. It was later merged into the Murfreesboro post office and is located in zip codes 37128 and 37129. The community celebrated its 200th birthday at the annual Blackman Barbecue at Blackman Middle School.

The Blackman area is home to three Rutherford County Schools: Blackman High School, Blackman Middle School, and Blackman Elementary School.

In April 2009, the Blackman area was struck by an EF4 tornado. Hundreds of homes were destroyed, and many more were heavily damaged.
