= William Gupton =

American politician

William Gupton (September 17, 1870 - 1957) was an American politician. He served as the mayor of Nashville, Tennessee, from 1917 to 1921.

== Early life ==
Gupton was born in Bowling Green, Kentucky, on September 17, 1870. His father, Alex, was a plasterer. He grew up in Nashville from the age of 5.

== Career ==
Gupton began his career as a delivery driver. He later worked as a bookkeeper and a realtor.

Gupton served as Mayor of Nashville from 1917 to 1921. He was forced to resign "on charges of malfeasance, misfeasance and neglect of duty." He served on the Nashville Board of Education from 1923 to 1930. He was the postmaster from 1933 to 1948.

Gupton was a co-founder of the Broadway National Bank in 1930, and he served as its president until 1934. He served as the president of the Nashville Chamber of Commerce in 1936.

== Personal life and death ==
Gupton was married on February 12, 1890, to Daisy Dean Mason. They had four children: Will Ed, Henry, Pearl Dean Loser and Annie Lee Ansley. Joseph Carlton Loser was his son-in-law. Gupton was a Baptist.

Gupton died in 1957.

Political offices
Preceded by Robert Ewing	Mayor of Nashville, Tennessee; 1917-1921	Succeeded by Felix Zollicoffer Wilson
