= Morton B. Howell =

American politician (1834–1909)

Mayor of Nashville
- In office 1875–1876

Personal details
- Born: Morton Boyte Howell; October 2, 1834; Norfolk, Virginia, U.S.
- Died: January 23, 1909 (aged 74); Nashville, Tennessee, U.S.
- Resting place: Mount Olivet Cemetery; Nashville, Tennessee, U.S.
- Spouse(s): Isabella Elliott (died 1868) Elizabeth Curd (m. 1870)
- Children: 10
- Education: Union University
- Alma mater: Richmond College; University of Virginia School of Law (LLB)

Morton Boyte Howell (October 2, 1834 – January 23, 1909) was an American Masonic leader, lawyer and politician. He served as the mayor of Nashville, Tennessee, in 1875–1876.

== Early life ==
Morton Boyte Howell was born on October 2, 1834, in Norfolk, Virginia, to Mary A. Morton (née Toy) and Robert Boyte Crawford Howell. His father was a Baptist minister. He grew up in Nashville, Tennessee.

Howell attended Union University in Murfreesboro, and he graduated from the Richmond College in Richmond, Virginia, in 1851. He graduated from the University of Virginia School of Law in 1856 with a Bachelor of Laws. He was then admitted to the bar in Nashville.

== Career ==
Howell served as clerk and master of Davidson County from 1865 to 1870. He subsequently practised the law privately. One of his clients was the Phillips & Buttorff Manufacturing Company.

Howell became a Mason in 1857. He was the Grand Commander of the Knights Templar of Tennessee in 1874.

Howell served as the mayor of Nashville in 1875-1876. He served as the president of the Nashville Board of Education for 15 years. He was a trustee of the University of Nashville.

== Personal life and death ==
Howell married Isabella Elliott of Hampton, Virginia. She died in 1868. Howell married Elizabeth "Bette" Curd in 1870. He had 10 children. He resided at 1230 2nd Avenue in Nashville.

Howell died on January 23, 1909, in Nashville. His funeral was conducted by Collins Denny, and he was buried in Mount Olivet Cemetery.
