= Robert Ewing (mayor) =

American politician (1849–1932)

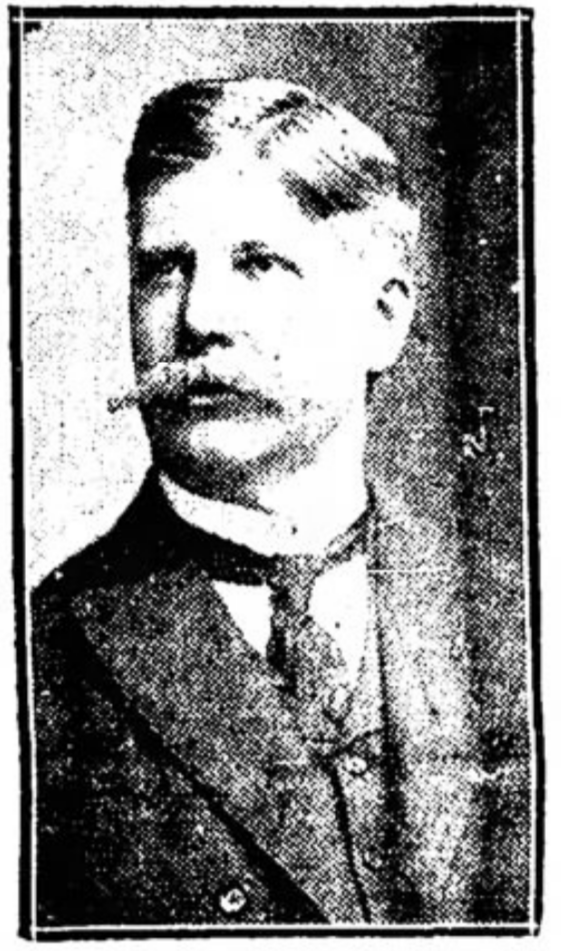
- Ewing in 1915
- Born: August 10, 1849; Nashville, Tennessee, U.S.
- Died: October 23, 1932 (aged 83); Nashville, Tennessee, U.S.
- Resting place: Mount Olivet Cemetery
- Education: Washington and Lee University
- Occupations: Businessman, politician
- Spouse: Hattie M. Hoyt
- Children: 5 sons, 3 daughters
- Parent(s): Andrew Ewing; Rowena Williams
- Relatives: Henry Watterson (brother-in-law)

Robert Ewing (August 10, 1849 – October 23, 1932) was an American politician and businessman. He served as the mayor of Nashville, Tennessee, from 1914 to 1916, and he was the vice president of the Southern Iron Company.

== Early life ==
Ewing was born on October 10, 1849, in Nashville, Tennessee. His father was Congressman Andrew Ewing. His mother was Rowena Williams. He had a brother and two sisters, one of whom married journalist Henry Watterson.

Ewing attended Washington and Lee University in 1867-1868, while Confederate General Robert E. Lee was the university president.

== Career ==
Ewing was a manager of the Buffalo Iron Company. He served as the vice president of the Southern Iron Company.

Ewing was a clerk and master of the chancery court, until he became the chairman of Nashville's board of public works and affairs. From 1914 to 1916, he served as the mayor of Nashville from 1914 to 1916.

Ewing was the business manager of the Nashville American, a newspaper later known as The Tennessean. He was also the secretary-general of the University of Nashville, and the secretary and treasurer of the Watkins Institute.

== Personal life and death ==
Ewing married Hattie M. Hoyt on March 28, 1876. They had five sons and three daughters. His wife predeceased him in 1931.

Ewing died in 1932 in Nashville. His funeral was held at the First Presbyterian Church, and he was buried at Mount Olivet Cemetery.

| Preceded by Hilary Ewing Howse | Mayor of Nashville, Tennessee; 1914–1916 | Succeeded by William Gupton |
