= Jo Howse =

New Zealand academic administrator

Jo Howse MNZM
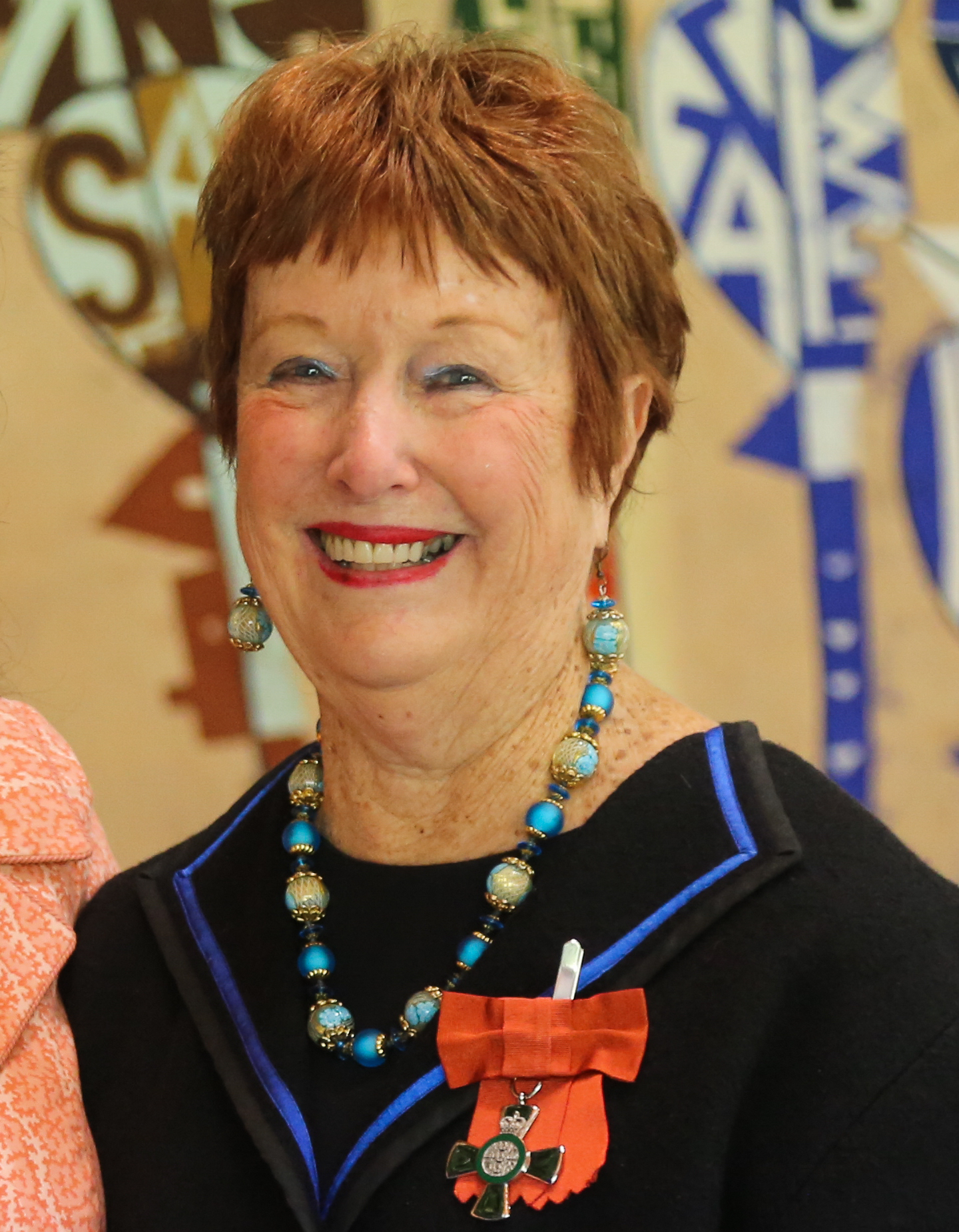
- Other name: Josephine Harle Howse
- Awards: Member of the New Zealand Order of Merit

Academic background
- Theses: Secondary professional development courses at Kohia Teachers Centre (1991); A decade of strategic management changes in New Zealand polytechnics, 1990–1999 (2005)

Josephine Harle Howse MNZM is a New Zealand academic administrator. In 2022 she was appointed a Member of the New Zealand Order of Merit for services to education.

== Academic career ==
Howse completed a Bachelor of Arts in 1988 and a Master of Education Administration in 1992, both at Massey University. Her master's thesis was on secondary professional development courses at the University of Auckland's Kohia Centre. Howse later completed a PhD at the University of Tasmania at Launceston, with a thesis on the strategic management changes in New Zealand polytechnics in the 1990s.

Howse worked at the Auckland University of Technology, where she led the Centre for Professional Education. She led the development of the qualification for Secondary Teacher Education Training and Tertiary Tutor Training, as well as managing the centre into the new School of Education and Social Sciences.

Howse was Deputy Chief Executive of the City of Manukau Education Trust, where she managed a family literacy programme for adult learners. Howse was involved in the New Zealand Educational Administration Society, and served a year as President of the Auckland branch from 1992, and then was national president in 1994. She was Vice President and then President of the Auckland branch of the Royal Commonwealth Society. Howse was Vice President and then International President of the Commonwealth Council of Education Administration and Management, and was the first New Zealander to be elected to the Commonwealth Presidency.

== Honours and awards ==
In the 2022 Queen's Birthday and Platinum Jubilee Honours Howse was appointed a Member of the New Zealand Order of Merit for services to education.

== Selected works ==
- Cardno, Carol; Robson, Joanne; Martin Bassett; Howse, Josephine (2018). "Middle-level leaders as direct instructional leaders in New Zealand schools: A study of role expectations and performance confidence". Journal of Educational Leadership Policy and Practice. 33 (2): 32–47. doi:10.21307/jelpp-2018-011. Wikidata Q127558134.
- Cardno, Carol; Emma Tolmie; Howse, Josephine (2018). "New spaces – new pedagogies: Implementing personalised learning in primary school innovative learning environments". Journal of Educational Leadership Policy and Practice. 33 (1): 111–124. doi:10.21307/jelpp-2017-010. Wikidata Q127557256.
- Cardno, Carol; Manjula Handjani; Howse, Josephine (2017). "Leadership Practices and Challenges in Managing Diversity to Achieve Ethnic Inclusion in Two New Zealand Secondary Schools" (PDF). New Zealand Journal of Educational Studies. 53 (1): 101–117. doi:10.1007/s40841-017-0096-x. Wikidata Q130469482.
- Howse, Josephine (2020). "Conversations that mattered: A decade of reforms of New Zealand tertiary institutions". Leading and Managing. 19 (1): 103–119. ISSN 1329-4539. Wikidata Q130469508.
- Cardno, Carol; Howse, Josephine (2005). "The Role and Management Development Needs of Secondary Principals in Tonga and the Fiji Islands". International Studies in Educational Administration. 33 (3): 34–44. ISSN 1324-1702. Wikidata Q130469507.
- Howse, Josephine (2020). "The corporatisation of New Zealand Tertiary Institutions: A decade of change". Leading and Managing. 23 (1): 65–76. ISSN 1329-4539. Wikidata Q130469506.
