= John A. McEwen =

Nashville, Tennessee mayor (1822–1858)

John A. McEwen (November 28, 1824 – December 3, 1858) was the mayor of Nashville, Tennessee, United States from 1857 to 1858. Born in Fayetteville, Tennessee, his father was R. H. McEwen. McEwen was a graduate of the University of Nashville, a lawyer admitted to the bar in 1845, and editor of the Nashville Daily Gazette 1852–1853. He served as secretary of the first Nashville Board of Education in 1854. McEwen died of consumption (chronic tuberculosis) in 1858, shortly after the end of his term in office.
