= Watkins College of Art at Belmont University =

Art school at Belmont University

- Type: Private art school
- Established: 1885
- Parent institution: Belmont University
- Students: 200+
- Location: Nashville, Tennessee, United States
- Campus: Urban
- Website: watkins.edu

Watkins College of Art at Belmont University is an art and design college of Belmont University in Nashville, Tennessee. It is accredited by the National Association of Schools of Art and Design (NASAD) and offers Bachelor of Fine Arts (BFA) degrees as well as post-graduate degrees in film and visual arts. As of 2019, approximately 200 students were enrolled, mostly full-time. In its final few years as an independent institution, the college resided in a converted 60,000-square-foot (5,600 m^{2}) 14-screen AMC Theatres multiplex in the MetroCenter area of north Nashville.

It was established in 1885. In 2020, the college merged with Belmont University.

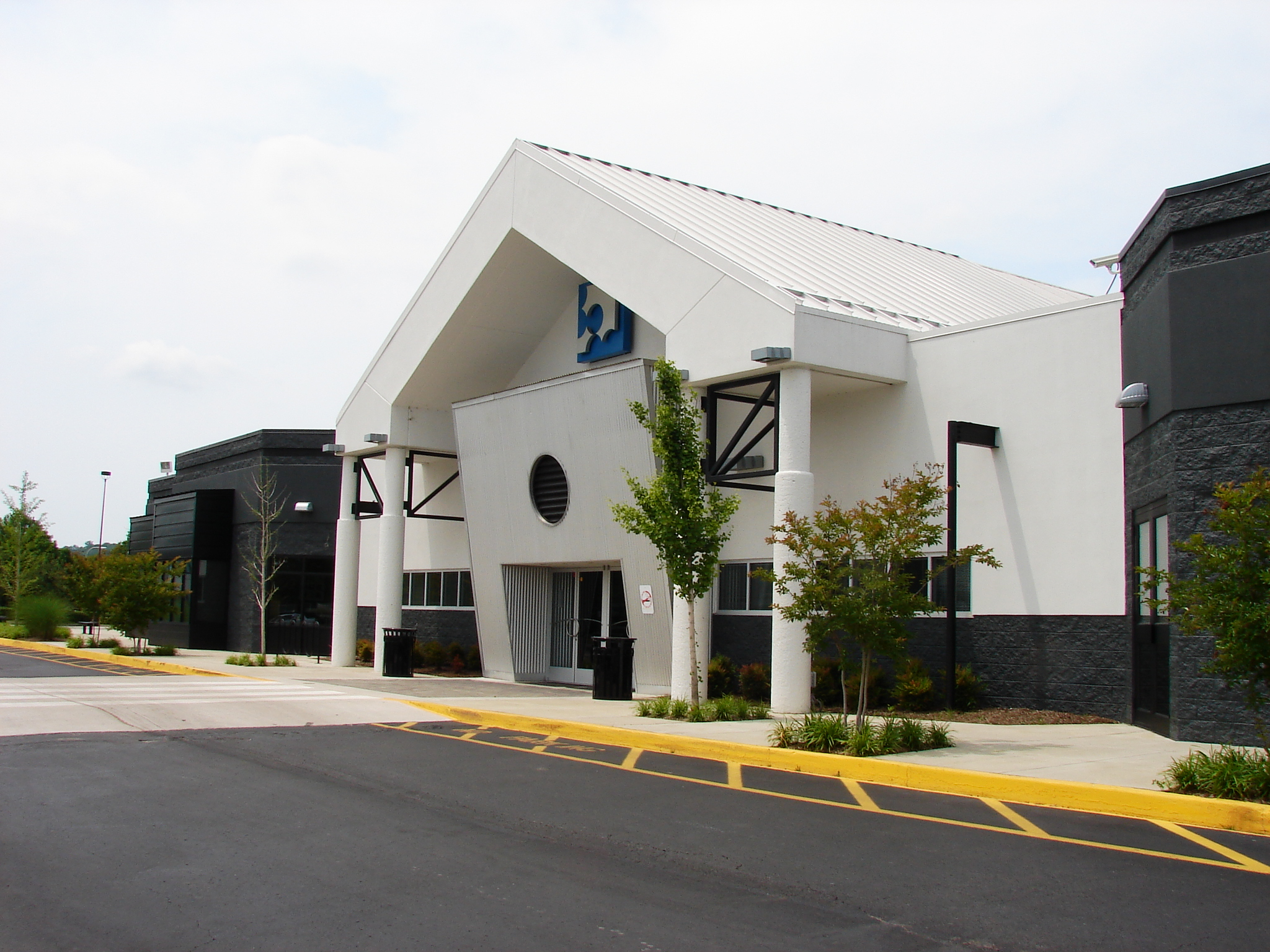
Watkins found a home at an abandoned AMC movie theater in Nashville's MetroCenter neighborhood in its final few years as an independent institution.

== History ==
Watkins was founded as the Watkins Institute in 1885 by Samuel Watkins, a self-educated Nashville businessman. The school became nationally accredited by the National Association of Schools of Art and Design (NASAD) in 1996. Watkins was accredited by the Southern Association of Colleges and Schools (SACS) and a member of the Association of Independent Colleges of Art and Design (AICAD). First located on Church Street in downtown Nashville, the school moved to temporary facilities in the 100 Oaks area in 1999, and then to a permanent location in 2002. Watkins opened its first residence hall in 2005 and the second in 2008.

The college merged with Belmont University and moved to the university's campus in 2020. The merger plans were not welcomed by all Watkins students and faculty with some particularly concerned about Belmont University's practices of firing non-Christian faculty and staff and restrictions of practices deemed incompatible with the university's Christian beliefs e.g., not allowing drawings of nude models, demanding a director remove swearing from a play's script.
