= National Register of Historic Places listings in Williamson County, Tennessee =

Location of Williamson County in Tennessee

This is a list of the National Register of Historic Places listings in Williamson County, Tennessee.

This is intended to be a complete list of the properties and districts on the National Register of Historic Places in Williamson County, Tennessee, United States. Latitude and longitude coordinates are provided for many National Register properties and districts; these locations may be seen together in a map.

There are 132 properties and districts listed on the National Register in the county, including 2 National Historic Landmarks. Another 16 properties were once listed but have been removed.

Contents: Counties in Tennessee
Anderson – Bedford – Benton – Bledsoe – Blount – Bradley – Campbell – Cannon – Carroll – Carter – Cheatham – Chester – Claiborne – Clay – Cocke – Coffee – Crockett – Cumberland – Davidson – Decatur – DeKalb – Dickson – Dyer – Fayette – Fentress – Franklin – Gibson – Giles – Grainger – Greene – Grundy – Hamblen – Hamilton – Hancock – Hardeman – Hardin – Hawkins – Haywood – Henderson – Henry – Hickman – Houston – Humphreys – Jackson – Jefferson – Johnson – Knox – Lake – Lauderdale – Lawrence – Lewis – Lincoln – Loudon – Macon – Madison – Marion – Marshall – Maury – McMinn – McNairy – Meigs – Monroe – Montgomery – Moore – Morgan – Obion – Overton – Perry – Pickett – Polk – Putnam – Rhea – Roane – Robertson – Rutherford – Scott – Sequatchie – Sevier – Shelby – Smith – Stewart – Sullivan – Sumner – Tipton – Trousdale – Unicoi – Union – Van Buren – Warren – Washington – Wayne – Weakley – White – Williamson – Wilson

This National Park Service list is complete through NPS recent listings posted May 8, 2026.

== Current listings ==
	Name on the Register	Image	Date listed	Location	City or town	Description
1	Adams Street Historic District	Adams Street Historic District	March 15, 2000 (#00000233)	1112-1400 Adams, 1251-1327 Adams St., and 304-308 Stewart St. 35°54′54″N 86°52′14″W	Franklin	Historic district with 37 buildings including bungalows, American Craftsman, and Victorian architecture
2	William Allison House	William Allison House	April 13, 1988 (#88000288)	U.S. Route 31A, 2 miles (3.2 km) south of College Grove; 35°45′48″N 86°41′25″W	College Grove	Historic Federal-style house with a central passage plan
3	Anderson Site		June 14, 1990 (#90000913)	Address Restricted	Franklin	
4	The Bank of College Grove	The Bank of College Grove	April 13, 1988 (#88000289)	U.S. Route 31A; 35°47′10″N 86°40′35″W	College Grove	
5	Bank of Nolensville	Bank of Nolensville	April 13, 1988 (#88000287)	7287 Nolensville Rd; 35°57′11″N 86°40′12″W	Nolensville	
6	Beasley-Parham House	Beasley-Parham House	April 13, 1988 (#88000286)	Lick Creek Rd., 1 mile (1.6 km) north of Natchez Trace; 35°50′19″N 87°06′48″W	Greenbrier	
7	Bostick Female Academy	Bostick Female Academy	April 15, 1982 (#82004070)	8013 Horton Hwy; 35°51′10″N 86°39′36″W	College Grove	
8	Boyd Mill Ruins	Boyd Mill Ruins	April 13, 1988 (#88000285)	Eastern bank of the West Harpeth River, 0.1 miles (0.16 km) south of Boxley Valley Rd. and Boyd Mill Pike; 35°55′15″N 86°58′01″W	Franklin	
9	William Boyd House	William Boyd House	April 13, 1988 (#88000284)	Boyd Mill Pike, 0.1 miles (0.16 km) north of Boxley Valley Rd. 35°55′27″N 86°57′55″W	Franklin	
10	Boyd-Wilson Farm	Boyd-Wilson Farm	July 5, 1996 (#96000748)	3209 Boxley Valley Rd. 35°54′52″N 86°58′05″W	Franklin	
11	William S. Campbell House	William S. Campbell House	October 29, 1975 (#75001798)	State Route 96; 35°55′27″N 86°53′08″W	Franklin	
12	Carnton	Carnton	January 18, 1973 (#73001857)	Confederate Cemetery Lane; 35°54′11″N 86°51′30″W	Franklin	Part of the Franklin Battlefield
13	John Henry Carothers House	John Henry Carothers House	November 27, 1989 (#89002028)	1343 Huffines Ridge Dr; 35°55′41″N 86°49′07″W	Franklin	
14	Cedarmont		July 12, 1984 (#84003747)	Off State Route 96; 35°53′24″N 86°48′05″W	Franklin	
15	Coats-Hines Archaeological Site	Coats-Hines Archaeological Site	July 12, 2011 (#11000422)	Southern side of a Spencer Creek tributary, west of the Nashville Golf and Athletic Club; 35°57′38″N 86°47′41″W	Franklin	One of only a very few sites in Eastern North America that contains direct evidence of mastodon hunting by Paleoindians during the late Pleistocene.
16	College Grove Methodist Church	College Grove Methodist Church	April 13, 1988 (#88000345)	U.S. Route 31A; 35°47′16″N 86°40′25″W	College Grove	
17	Cox House	Cox House	February 28, 1980 (#80003881)	150 Franklin Rd. 35°55′43″N 86°51′54″W	Franklin	
18	John Crafton House	John Crafton House	April 13, 1988 (#88000347)	4378 N Chapel Rd; 35°52′44″N 86°46′10″W	Franklin	
19	Craig-Beasley House	Craig-Beasley House	December 23, 2003 (#03001342)	425 Boyd Mill Ave; 35°55′22″N 86°52′54″W	Franklin	
20	Jacob Critz House		April 13, 1988 (#88000343)	1830 Evergreen Rd; 35°47′56″N 86°56′44″W	Thompson's Station	
21	Thomas L. Critz House	Thomas L. Critz House	April 13, 1988 (#88000342)	2677 Critz Ln; 35°48′38″N 86°52′50″W	Thompson's Station	
22	Andrew Crockett House	Andrew Crockett House	April 13, 1988 (#88000302)	1500 Volunteer Pkwy; 35°59′01″N 86°47′02″W	Brentwood	
23	Samuel Crockett House	Samuel Crockett House	April 14, 1988 (#88000296)	Crockett Rd. and Wilson Pike; 35°58′30″N 86°46′30″W	Brentwood	
24	Dortch Stove Works	Dortch Stove Works	November 13, 1997 (#97001438)	230 N. Franklin Rd. 35°55′58″N 86°47′36″W	Franklin	
25	Douglass-Reams House	Douglass-Reams House	April 13, 1988 (#88000293)	2435 Douglass Glenn Ln. 35°52′28″N 86°50′59″W	Franklin	
26	Joseph Elliston House	Joseph Elliston House	April 13, 1988 (#88000291)	2766 Hillsboro Rd. 36°01′34″N 86°52′39″W	Brentwood	c.1817 two-story frame house with large exterior end chimneys
27	Fewkes Group Archaeological Site	Fewkes Group Archaeological Site	April 21, 1980 (#80003880)	Located in Primm Historic Park on the grounds of Boiling Spring Academy; also 8400 Moores Ln. 35°58′00″N 86°46′35″W	Brentwood	A Mississippian culture archaeological site located in the city of Brentwood. The 15-acre site consists of the remains of a mound complex and village roughly dating to 1050-1475. Part of the Mississippian Cultural Resources of the Central Basin (AD 900-1450) Multiple Property Submission. Second set of boundaries represents a boundary increase of March 12, 2012.
28	Forest Hills School	Forest Hills School	April 13, 1988 (#88000290)	Carters Creek Pike 0.2 miles (0.32 km) south of Bear Creek Rd. 35°51′51″N 86°57′15″W	Franklin	
29	Fort Granger	Fort Granger	January 8, 1973 (#73001858)	Off Liberty Pike; 35°55′33″N 86°51′38″W	Franklin	
30	Franklin Battlefield	Franklin Battlefield	October 15, 1966 (#66000734)	South of Franklin on U.S. Route 31; 35°54′13″N 86°51′58″W	Franklin	Includes the Carter House
31	Franklin City Cemetery	Franklin City Cemetery	November 14, 2012 (#12000946)	N. Margin St. between 3rd & 4th Aves. N. 35°55′41″N 86°52′18″W	Franklin	
32	Franklin Historic District	Franklin Historic District	October 5, 1972 (#72001254)	Centered around Main St. (State Route 96) and 3rd Ave. (U.S. Route 31); also 3rd Ave. S. between S. Margin St. and the railroad line; also the 300 block of 4th Ave., S. 35°55′30″N 86°52′09″W	Franklin	Second and third sets of boundaries represent boundary increases of April 13, 1988 and March 15, 2000
33	John Frost House	John Frost House	April 13, 1988 (#88000308)	Old Smyrna Rd., 1.5 miles (2.4 km) east of Wilson Pike; 36°01′06″N 86°45′27″W	Brentwood	
34	James Giddens House		April 13, 1988 (#88000301)	Farm Ln. at the northern boundary of Thompson's Station; 35°48′02″N 86°55′16″W	Thompson's Station	
35	Samuel F. Glass House		April 13, 1988 (#88000309)	State Route 96 at Boyd Mill Pike; 35°56′13″N 86°55′39″W	Franklin	
36	Glass Mounds Discontiguous Archeological District		June 4, 2015 (#15000333)	4000 Golf Club Ln. 35°56′02″N 86°56′10″W	Franklin	On the grounds of Westhaven Golf Club
37	Glen Echo	Glen Echo	November 7, 1976 (#76001808)	North of Franklin off U.S. Route 31 on Spencer Creek Rd. 35°57′00″N 86°51′29″W	Franklin	
38	Abram Glenn House	Abram Glenn House	April 13, 1988 (#88000310)	McCanless Rd., 1.5 miles (2.4 km) east of U.S. Route 41A; 35°53′00″N 86°38′02″W	Triune	
39	Henry P. Gray House	Henry P. Gray House	April 13, 1988 (#88000313)	Old Hillsboro Rd. at Boyd Mill Rd. 35°55′30″N 86°58′21″W	Franklin	
40	Sherwood Green House	Sherwood Green House	April 13, 1988 (#88000311)	Rocky Fork Rd., 0.5 miles (0.80 km) east of Nolensville; 35°57′12″N 86°39′30″W	Nolensville	
41	Denny P. Hadley House		April 14, 1988 (#88000283)	Off U.S. Route 31/Franklin Rd. south of Brentwood; 36°00′36″N 86°47′34″W	Brentwood	
42	Hamilton-Brown House	Hamilton-Brown House	August 2, 2006 (#06000668)	845 Old Charlotte Pike; 35°56′15″N 86°55′07″W	Franklin	
43	Franklin Hardeman House	Franklin Hardeman House	April 13, 1988 (#88000280)	Lewisburg Pike, 1 mile (1.6 km) south of Goose Creek Bypass; 35°50′46″N 86°50′43″W	Franklin	
44	Harlinsdale Farm	Harlinsdale Farm	May 3, 2006 (#06000344)	239 Franklin Rd., 315 Franklin Rd. 35°56′36″N 86°51′57″W	Franklin	A boundary increase was approved October 23, 2023.
45	Harpeth Furnace (40WM83)		April 11, 1988 (#88000253)	Address Restricted	Fernvale	
46	Harrison House	Harrison House	June 18, 1975 (#75001799)	South of Franklin on Columbia Pike; 35°52′56″N 86°52′51″W	Franklin	
47	John Herbert House	John Herbert House	April 13, 1988 (#88000278)	3201 Herbert Dr; 35°55′51″N 86°45′21″W	Franklin	
48	Hincheyville Historic District	Hincheyville Historic District	April 15, 1982 (#82004071)	W. Main, Fair, 6th, 7th, 8th, 9th, and 10th Sts. 35°55′21″N 86°52′34″W	Franklin	Boundary increase/decrease approved March 27, 2020.
49	Hiram Masonic Lodge No. 7	Hiram Masonic Lodge No. 7	November 7, 1973 (#73001859)	S. 2nd Ave. 35°55′32″N 86°52′14″W	Franklin	
50	Robert Hodge House	Robert Hodge House	November 9, 2005 (#05001224)	409 Madison Court; 35°53′26″N 86°51′12″W	Franklin	
51	Thomas Holt House	Thomas Holt House	April 14, 1988 (#88000274)	9303 Crockett Rd. 35°58′30″N 86°45′50″W	Brentwood	
52	Homestead Manor	Homestead Manor	April 29, 1977 (#77001300)	North of Thompson's Station on U.S. Route 31; 35°48′23″N 86°54′09″W	Thompson's Station	
53	Huff Store	Huff Store	April 13, 1988 (#88000321)	5452 Carters Creek Pike; 35°48′44″N 86°58′59″W	Burwood	
54	John Hunter House		April 13, 1988 (#88000319)	Old State Route 96 at Carl Rd. 35°52′48″N 86°58′33″W	Franklin	
55	Hartwell B. Hyde House		April 13, 1988 (#88000318)	State Route 96, 1 mile (1.6 km) east of U.S. Route 41A; 35°51′18″N 86°37′57″W	Triune	
56	James P. Johnson House	James P. Johnson House	April 13, 1988 (#88000316)	U.S. Route 31, 0.3 miles (0.48 km) south of W. Harpeth Rd. 35°50′29″N 86°52′58″W	Thompson's Station	
57	William W. Johnson House	William W. Johnson House	April 13, 1988 (#88000314)	Farm Ln., 0.5 miles (0.80 km) south of Clovercroft Rd. and 0.5 miles (0.80 km) east of Pleasant Hill Rd. 35°55′43″N 86°42′35″W	Franklin	
58	James Johnston House	James Johnston House	March 26, 1976 (#76001807)	South of Brentwood on U.S. Route 31; 35°59′47″N 86°48′34″W	Brentwood	
59	Newton Jordan House	Newton Jordan House	April 13, 1988 (#88000298)	New Rd., 1 mile (1.6 km) east of U.S. Route 41A; 35°48′58″N 86°38′42″W	Triune	
60	Jordan-Williams House	Jordan-Williams House	April 13, 1988 (#88000341)	Rocky Fork Rd., 2 miles (3.2 km) east of Nolensville; 35°56′36″N 86°37′14″W	Nolensville	
61	Claiborne Kinnard House	Claiborne Kinnard House	April 13, 1988 (#88000355)	Carters Creek Pike, 0.5 miles (0.80 km) north of Bear Creek Rd. 35°52′20″N 86°56′31″W	Franklin	
62	Knight-Moran House		April 13, 1988 (#88000295)	Off the Old Natchez Trace, 0.1 miles (0.16 km) south of Moran Rd. 36°00′55″N 86°56′18″W	Franklin	
63	Knights of Pythias Pavilion	Knights of Pythias Pavilion	April 14, 1988 (#88000292)	1015 Carlisle Ln; 35°55′57″N 86°54′30″W	Franklin	
64	William Leaton House	William Leaton House	April 13, 1988 (#88000357)	Hillsboro Rd./U.S. Route 431 at Manely Ln. 36°00′40″N 86°53′21″W	Franklin	
65	Samuel B. Lee House		April 13, 1988 (#88000300)	Duplex Rd., 0.5 miles (0.80 km) west of Lewisburg Pike; also 3085 Duplex-Spring Hill Rd. 35°44′35″N 86°50′44″W	Duplex	Second address represents a boundary increase of January 12, 1993, Maplewood Farm
66	Leipers Fork Historic District	Leipers Fork Historic District	July 1, 1998 (#98000818)	Roughly bounded by Joseph St., Old State Route 96, Old Hillsboro Rd., and Sycamore St. 35°53′46″N 86°59′57″W	Leiper's Fork	
67	Lewisburg Avenue Historic District	Lewisburg Avenue Historic District	April 13, 1988 (#88000312)	Roughly bounded by S. Margin St., Lewisburg Ave., and Adams St.; also along sections of Lewisburg Ave., South Margin, and Adams Sts. 35°55′04″N 86°52′10″W	Franklin	Second set of addresses represent a boundary change approved April 20, 2023.
68	Lotz House	Lotz House	December 12, 1976 (#76001809)	1111 Columbia Ave. 35°55′04″N 86°52′22″W	Franklin	
69	Maney-Sidway House	Maney-Sidway House	April 13, 1988 (#88000333)	Myles Manor Ct., west of Franklin Rd./U.S. Route 31; 35°56′01″N 86°51′58″W	Franklin	
70	William Martin House	William Martin House	April 13, 1988 (#88000334)	5215 Seward Rd. 36°01′34″N 86°48′23″W	Brentwood	
71	H. G. W. Mayberry House	H. G. W. Mayberry House	April 13, 1988 (#88000363)	Bear Creek Rd., 0.5 miles (0.80 km) west of Carters Creek Pike; 35°52′09″N 86°58′07″W	Franklin	
72	Henry H. Mayberry House	Henry H. Mayberry House	April 13, 1988 (#88000335)	151 Franklin Rd; 35°55′46″N 86°52′02″W	Franklin	
73	David McEwen House		April 13, 1988 (#88000360)	Off the eastern side of Franklin Rd./U.S. Route 31, 0.2 miles (0.32 km) north of Spencer Creek Rd. 35°56′41″N 86°50′14″W	Franklin	
74	McGavock-Gaines House	McGavock-Gaines House	April 13, 1988 (#88000329)	1008 Culpepper Ln. 35°54′01″N 86°50′25″W	Franklin	
75	McLemore House	McLemore House	November 18, 1999 (#99001372)	447 11th Ave., N. 35°55′31″N 86°52′47″W	Franklin	
76	Daniel McMahan House	Daniel McMahan House	April 13, 1988 (#88000331)	111 Daniel McMahon Ln; 35°56′42″N 86°51′37″W	Franklin	
77	Meeting-of-the-Waters	Meeting-of-the-Waters	August 26, 1982 (#82004072)	Northwest of Franklin on Del Rio Pike; 35°58′11″N 86°55′12″W	Franklin	
78	Montpier	Montpier	August 26, 1982 (#82004073)	Northwest of Franklin off Old Hillsboro Pike; 35°58′59″N 86°56′01″W	Franklin	
79	Mooreland	Mooreland	July 24, 1975 (#75001797)	Off U.S. Route 31; 36°01′46″N 86°47′18″W	Brentwood	
80	Samuel S. Morton House		April 13, 1988 (#88000365)	Carters Creek Pike, 0.3 miles (0.48 km) north of Bear Creek Rd. 35°52′19″N 86°58′30″W	Franklin	
81	John Motheral House	John Motheral House	April 13, 1988 (#88000339)	Moran Rd. at the Harpeth River; 36°01′01″N 86°53′56″W	Franklin	
82	Mountview	Mountview	November 20, 1986 (#86003293)	913 Franklin Rd. 36°00′19″N 86°47′45″W	Brentwood	
83	Natchez Street Historic District	Natchez Street Historic District	February 11, 2004 (#04000030)	Roughly bounded by Columbia Ave., Granbury St., and W. Main St. 35°55′05″N 86°52′40″W	Franklin	
84	John Neely House		April 13, 1988 (#88000366)	Sedberry Rd., 2 miles (3.2 km) south of W. Harpeth Rd. 35°49′07″N 86°55′00″W	Thompson's Station	
85	Nolensville School	Nolensville School	March 20, 2012 (#12000138)	7248 Nolensville Rd. 35°57′27″N 86°40′16″W	Nolensville	
86	Oak Hall	Oak Hall	March 13, 1986 (#86000393)	1706 Wilson Pike; 35°57′46″N 86°46′10″W	Brentwood	
87	Dr. Hezekiah Oden House	Dr. Hezekiah Oden House	April 13, 1988 (#88000322)	1312 TN-106; 35°51′57″N 86°50′47″W	Franklin	
88	William Ogilvie House		April 14, 1988 (#88000323)	Western side of U.S. Route 31A, 1 mile (1.6 km) south of College Grove; 35°46′22″N 86°41′17″W	College Grove	
89	Old Natchez Trace	Old Natchez Trace	May 30, 1975 (#75002125)	From the Alabama/Tennessee border to State Route 100 in Davidson County	Franklin	Extends into Davidson, Hickman, Lawrence, Lewis, Maury, and Wayne counties
90	Old Town	Old Town	April 14, 1988 (#88000324)	Old Natchez Trace, 1.5 miles (2.4 km) south of Moran Rd. 35°59′37″N 86°56′10″W	Franklin	Also known as the Thomas Brown House
91	Old Town Archeological Site (40WM2)	Old Town Archeological Site (40WM2)	September 16, 1989 (#89000159)	Western side of the Big Harpeth River, 6 miles (9.7 km) northwest of Franklin; 35°59′38″N 86°56′12″W	Franklin	Native American village and mound complex of the Mississippian culture, an archeological site
92	Old Town Bridge	Old Town Bridge	April 13, 1988 (#88000325)	Over Brown's Creek just west of Old Natchez Trace Rd. 35°59′45″N 86°56′10″W	Franklin	Site of historic bridge bringing Natchez Trace branch over the Harpeth River
93	Owen Chapel Church of Christ	Owen Chapel Church of Christ	October 23, 1986 (#86002914)	1101 Franklin Rd. 36°00′00″N 86°49′14″W	Brentwood	
94	Dr. Urban Owen House	Dr. Urban Owen House	April 13, 1988 (#88000326)	8740 Horton Hwy; 35°47′08″N 86°40′33″W	College Grove	
95	Owen-Cox House	Owen-Cox House	April 13, 1988 (#88000327)	Moores Ln., 1 mile (1.6 km) east of Interstate 65; 35°57′55″N 86°47′18″W	Brentwood	
96	Owen-Primm House	Owen-Primm House	April 13, 1988 (#88000328)	Moores Ln. at Wilson Pike; 35°58′01″N 86°46′46″W	Brentwood	
97	Parks Place	Parks Place	September 27, 1984 (#84003753)	Cox Rd. 35°48′53″N 86°40′11″W	College Grove	
98	Nicholas Tate Perkins House	Nicholas Tate Perkins House	April 13, 1988 (#88000330)	Del Rio Pike, 0.2 miles (0.32 km) west of Cotton Rd. 35°57′35″N 86°54′30″W	Franklin	
99	George Pollard House	George Pollard House	April 13, 1988 (#88000336)	Wilson Pike, 1.2 miles (1.9 km) south of Peytonsville Rd. 35°53′36″N 86°43′46″W	Franklin	
100	John Pope House	John Pope House	April 13, 1988 (#88000338)	Pope Chapel Rd. 35°47′56″N 86°58′41″W	Burwood	
101	Mordecai Puryear House		April 13, 1988 (#88000340)	Lewisburg Pike, 0.2 miles (0.32 km) north of Henpeck Ln. 35°52′25″N 86°50′35″W	Franklin	
102	Rainey House	Rainey House	July 8, 1970 (#70000621)	244 1st Ave. 35°53′23″N 86°51′55″W	Franklin	
103	Ravenswood	Ravenswood	July 7, 1983 (#83003073)	Wilson Pike; 35°56′45″N 86°46′13″W	Brentwood	
104	Rest Haven Cemetery	Rest Haven Cemetery	November 14, 2012 (#12000947)	N. Margin St. between 4th & 5th Aves. N. 35°55′38″N 86°52′23″W	Franklin	
105	Y. M. Rizer House	Y. M. Rizer House	April 13, 1988 (#88000348)	Del Rio Pike, 0.75 miles (1.21 km) west of Hillsboro Rd. 35°56′16″N 86°53′12″W	Franklin	
106	Roper's Knob Fortifications	Roper's Knob Fortifications	April 6, 2000 (#00000353)	Off Liberty Pike; 35°56′32″N 86°50′33″W	Franklin	
107	St. Paul's Episcopal Church	St. Paul's Episcopal Church	February 23, 1972 (#72001255)	510 Main St. 35°55′25″N 86°52′21″W	Franklin	
108	James Scales House	James Scales House	April 13, 1988 (#88000350)	U.S. Route 31A; 35°48′18″N 86°39′42″W	Kirkland	
109	John Seward House	John Seward House	April 13, 1988 (#88000352)	Liberty Pike, 0.75 miles (1.21 km) west of Wilson Pike; 35°55′41″N 86°46′57″W	Franklin	
110	Thomas Shute House	Thomas Shute House	April 13, 1988 (#88000367)	370 Franklin Rd; 35°57′11″N 86°51′11″W	Franklin	
111	Alexander Smith House	Alexander Smith House	March 17, 2005 (#05000186)	1304 Wilson Pike; 35°59′15″N 86°46′36″W	Brentwood	
112	Nathaniel Smithson House	Nathaniel Smithson House	April 13, 1988 (#88000353)	Peytonsville-Bethesda Rd. 35°49′06″N 86°46′37″W	Peytonsville	
113	Smithson-McCall Farm		March 15, 2007 (#07000158)	6779 Comstock Rd. 35°44′43″N 86°47′13″W	Bethesda	Working family farm with intact agricultural landscape and c.1830 farmhouse
114	Constantine Sneed House		April 13, 1988 (#88000354)	9135 Old Smyrna Rd. 36°00′56″N 86°46′16″W	Brentwood	
115	Sparkman-Skelley Farm		March 27, 2000 (#00000234)	5540 Leiper's Creek Rd. 35°51′11″N 87°02′15″W	Boston	
116	William Steele House	William Steele House	April 13, 1988 (#88000356)	Bethesda-Arno Rd., 0.5 miles (0.80 km) east of Bethesda; 35°46′05″N 86°47′15″W	Franklin	
117	Thompson Station Bank	Thompson Station Bank	April 13, 1988 (#88000358)	1545 Thompson's Station Rd W 35°47′59″N 86°54′36″W	Thompson's Station	
118	Beverly Toon House	Beverly Toon House	April 14, 1988 (#88000361)	Arno Rd., 0.5 miles (0.80 km) west of Peytonsville Rd. 35°52′21″N 86°47′17″W	Franklin	
119	Toussaint L'Overture County Cemetery	Toussaint L'Overture County Cemetery	December 13, 1995 (#95001435)	Del Rio Pike at its junction with Hillsboro Rd. 35°55′50″N 86°52′37″W	Franklin	
120	Triangle School	Triangle School	July 3, 2007 (#07000663)	7121 Westview Blvd; 35°56′29″N 87°08′58″W	Fairview	
121	Trinity Methodist Church	Trinity Methodist Church	April 13, 1988 (#88000362)	2084 Wilson Pike; 35°54′38″N 86°45′11″W	Franklin	
122	Triune Fortification		February 5, 1999 (#99000137)	Address Restricted	Arrington	
123	Alpheus Truett House	Alpheus Truett House	April 13, 1988 (#88000364)	228 Franklin Rd; 35°55′54″N 86°51′45″W	Franklin	
124	Andrew C. Vaughn House	Andrew C. Vaughn House	April 13, 1988 (#88000368)	501 Murfreesboro Rd. 35°55′09″N 86°51′36″W	Franklin	
125	Warner Park Historic Park	Warner Park Historic Park	January 20, 1984 (#84003528)	Roughly bounded by the Little Harpeth River, Belle Meade Boulevard, State Route 100, and Chickering Rd. 36°03′47″N 86°53′30″W	Nashville	Extends into Davidson County
126	James Webb House	James Webb House	April 13, 1988 (#88000369)	U.S. Route 31A at Taliaferro Rd. 35°49′03″N 86°39′53″W	Triune	
127	James Wilhoite House	James Wilhoite House	April 13, 1988 (#88000370)	8991 Horton Hwy; 35°45′19″N 86°40′54″W	Allisona	
128	Winstead Hill	Winstead Hill	November 29, 1974 (#74001930)	2 miles (3.2 km) south of Franklin on U.S. Route 31; 35°53′17″N 86°52′45″W	Franklin	Part of the Franklin Battlefield.
129	Winstead House	Winstead House	April 18, 1979 (#79002486)	423 S Margin St; 35°55′13″N 86°52′07″W	Franklin	
130	John M. Winstead Houses	John M. Winstead Houses	April 13, 1988 (#88000373)	Concord Rd., 1 mile (1.6 km) east of Edmondson Pike; 35°58′44″N 86°44′09″W	Brentwood	Three buildings, the oldest of which dates to c. 1800, on an area of 10.5 acres (4.2 ha). Architectural plans include the single-pen and I-house forms.
131	WSM Radio Transmission Complex	WSM Radio Transmission Complex	March 15, 2011 (#11000087)	8012 Concord Rd. 35°59′54″N 86°47′29″W	Brentwood	
132	Wyatt Hall		July 2, 1980 (#80003882)	U.S. Route 31; 35°56′22″N 86°51′23″W	Franklin	

== Former listings ==
	Name on the Register	Image	Date listed	Date removed	Location	City or town	Description
1	Spencer Buford House	Spencer Buford House	April 13, 1988 (#88000346)	November 19, 2015	U.S. Route 31, 0.5 miles (0.80 km) south of Critz Ln. 35°48′32″N 86°53′50″W	Thompson's Station	
2	Newton Cannon House		April 19, 1984 (#84003741)	February 9, 1987	Taliaferro Rd.	College Grove vicinity	Home of Newton Cannon, a U.S. Congressman and Governor of Tennessee. Destroyed by arson on January 27, 1987.
3	Cool Springs Farm		November 10, 1983 (#83004314)	October 20, 1993	Jordan Road, south of Moore's Lane	Franklin	Relocated to Crockett Park in Brentwood in September, 1993.
4	James E. Collins House		April 13, 1988 (#88000344)	January 17, 1995	Hillsboro Rd./U.S. Route 431, ½ mile south of Spencer Creek Road	Franklin vicinity	Williamson County MRA. Relocated to a temporary location in 1996.
5	Stokely Davis House		April 13, 1988 (#88000294)	July 15, 2015	Old Natchez Trace 1 mile (1.6 km) south of Moran Rd. 36°00′02″N 86°56′13″W	Franklin vicinity	Also known as Fairmount; Burned down on January 29, 2014.
6	William King House		April 13, 1988 (#88000297)	June 14, 1996	State Route 96, 1½ miles west of U.S. Route 41A	Franklin vicinity	Williamson County MRA
7	Lamb-Stephens House		April 13, 1988 (#88000299)	November 18, 2011	Burke Hollow Rd., 1½ mile east of Wilson Pike; 35°53′59″N 86°42′32″W	Franklin vicinity	Williamson County MRA
8	Liberty Hill School		April 13, 1988 (#88000315)	June 10, 2022	Crow Cut Rd. 35°58′41″N 87°10′53″W	Liberty Hill	Demolished
9	Liberty School		June 22, 1988 (#88000317)	November 15, 2006	Liberty Church Rd., ¼ mile north of Concord Rd.	Franklin	Williamson County MRA
10	Christopher McEwen House		April 13, 1988 (#88000320)	March 23, 1995	Franklin Rd., 1/5 mile south of Berry's Chapel Rd.	Franklin vicinity	Williamson County MRA. Delisted due to extensive alterations.
11	George W. Morton House		April 13, 1988 (#88000337)	July 20, 2020	U.S. Route 41A, 0.5 miles (0.80 km) north of Sunset Rd. 35°57′58″N 86°40′33″W	Nolensville	Delisted due to relocation on February 4, 2019.
12	Henry Pointer House		April 13, 1988 (#88000332)	April 4, 2006	U.S. Route 31, south of Thompsons Station	Thompson's Station vicinity	Williamson County MRA. Delisted due to relocation on September 20, 2005.
13	John S. Russwurm House		April 13, 1988 (#88000349)	November 18, 2011	Spann Town Rd., 0.5 miles (0.80 km) east of U.S. Route 41A; 35°51′45″N 86°38′37″W	Triune vicinity	Williamson County MRA
14	Joseph Scales House	Joseph Scales House	April 13, 1988 (#88000351)	June 10, 2022	Off Cox Rd., 1 mile (1.6 km) west of U.S. Route 41A; 35°49′24″N 86°40′27″W	Triune	
15	Thompson Store		April 13, 1988 (#88000359)	November 25, 2009	Duplex Rd. and Lewisburg Pike; 35°44′46″N 86°50′16″W	Duplex	Williamson County MRA
16	Joseph Wilson House	Joseph Wilson House	April 13, 1988 (#88000372)	November 13, 2017	Clovercroft Rd., 0.2 miles (0.32 km) west of Wilson Pike; 35°55′20″N 86°46′08″W	Franklin	Destroyed by fire on August 30, 2016.

== See also ==
- List of National Historic Landmarks in Tennessee
- National Register of Historic Places listings in Tennessee
