= Oak Hall =

Oak Hall may refer to:

== Places ==
=== Canada ===
- Oak Hall (Niagara Falls, Ontario), a mansion

=== United Kingdom ===
- Oak Hall, Haslemere, a Grade II listed country house in Surrey

=== United States ===
- Oak Hall School, a preparatory school in Gainesville, Florida
- Oak Hall (Bunkie, Louisiana), listed on the National Register of Historic Places (NRHP)
- Oak Hall, Northport, Maine, or Cobe Estate, listed on the National Register of Historic Places (NRHP)
- Oak Hall (Columbia, Maryland), a historic slave plantation
- Oak Hall, Kansas City, Missouri, residence of William Rockhill Nelson
- Oak Hall (Urbana College), Urbana, Ohio
- Oak Hall Historic District, College Township, Pennsylvania
- Oak Hall (Brentwood, Tennessee), listed on the NRHP
- Oak Hall, Virginia, a census-designated place in Accomack County
- Oak Hall, Fitchburg, Wisconsin, an unincorporated community in Dane County
