= Cedarmont =

Cedarmount may refer to:

- Cedarmont (album), an album of Lawson (band)
- Cedarmont (Williamson County, Tennessee), historic house listed on the U.S. National Register of Historic Places
