= John S. Russwurm House =

Historic house in Tennessee, United States

- John S. Russworm House
- Formerly listed on the U.S. National Register of Historic Places
- Location within Tennessee Location within the United States
- Location: Spann Town Rd. 1/2 mi. E of US Alt. 41, Triune, Tennessee
- Coordinates: 35°51′45″N 86°38′37″W
- Area: 1.4 acres (0.57 ha)
- Built: c. 1819, c. 1830 and c. 1900
- Architectural style: Federal, Double cell
- MPS: Williamson County MRA
- NRHP reference No.: 88000349

Significant dates
- Added to NRHP: April 13, 1988
- Removed from NRHP: November 18, 2011

The John S. Russwurm House is a house with Federal architecture, dating from 1819, in Triune, Tennessee that was listed on the National Register of Historic Places in 1988.

The listing was for one contributing building on a 1.4 acres (0.57 ha) that also included are two non-contributing buildings.

It was built by John Russwurm, an early settler of the Williamson County. As of a 1988 study, the house was deemed to be the best surviving example of either a single or double cell brick residence from its era. It was built first as a one-story brick residence, and "was later enlarged with a two-story double, cell addition. This double cell arrangement is the only remaining example of this type of construction in Williamson County."

The Constantine Sneed House, also NRHP-listed, seems to have had a double cell plan but has since been altered.

The Russwurm house was delisted from the National Register on November 18, 2011. Delistings usually occur after a building has been demolished or otherwise lost historic integrity.

== See also ==
- John B. Russwurm House, Portland, Maine, also listed on the National Register
