= James Webb House =

Historic house in Tennessee, United States

- U.S. National Register of Historic Places
- Location within Tennessee Location within the United States
- Location: US Alt. 31 at Taliaferro Rd., Triune, Tennessee
- Coordinates: 35°49′3″N 86°39′53″W
- Area: 33 acres (13 ha)
- Built: c.1850
- Architect: Heitmann, John
- Architectural style: Greek Revival and Italianate
- MPS: Williamson County MRA
- NRHP reference No.: 88000369
- Added to NRHP: April 13, 1988

The James Webb House is a property in Triune, Tennessee that dates from c.1850 and that was listed on the National Register of Historic Places (NRHP) in 1988. It has also been known as Kirkview Farm.

It includes Greek Revival and Italianate architecture. When listed the property included two contributing buildings and one non-contributing structure on an area of 33 acres (13 ha).

It is one of about thirty fine antebellum brick and frame residences in Williamson County that survive and that were built as centers of slave plantations. It is among several "notable two-story frame residences" built in the eastern part of the county; another is the Samuel B. Lee House of Maplewood Farm. The NRHP eligibility of the property was covered in a 1988 study of Williamson County historical resources.
