= Thompson Station Bank =

- U.S. National Register of Historic Places
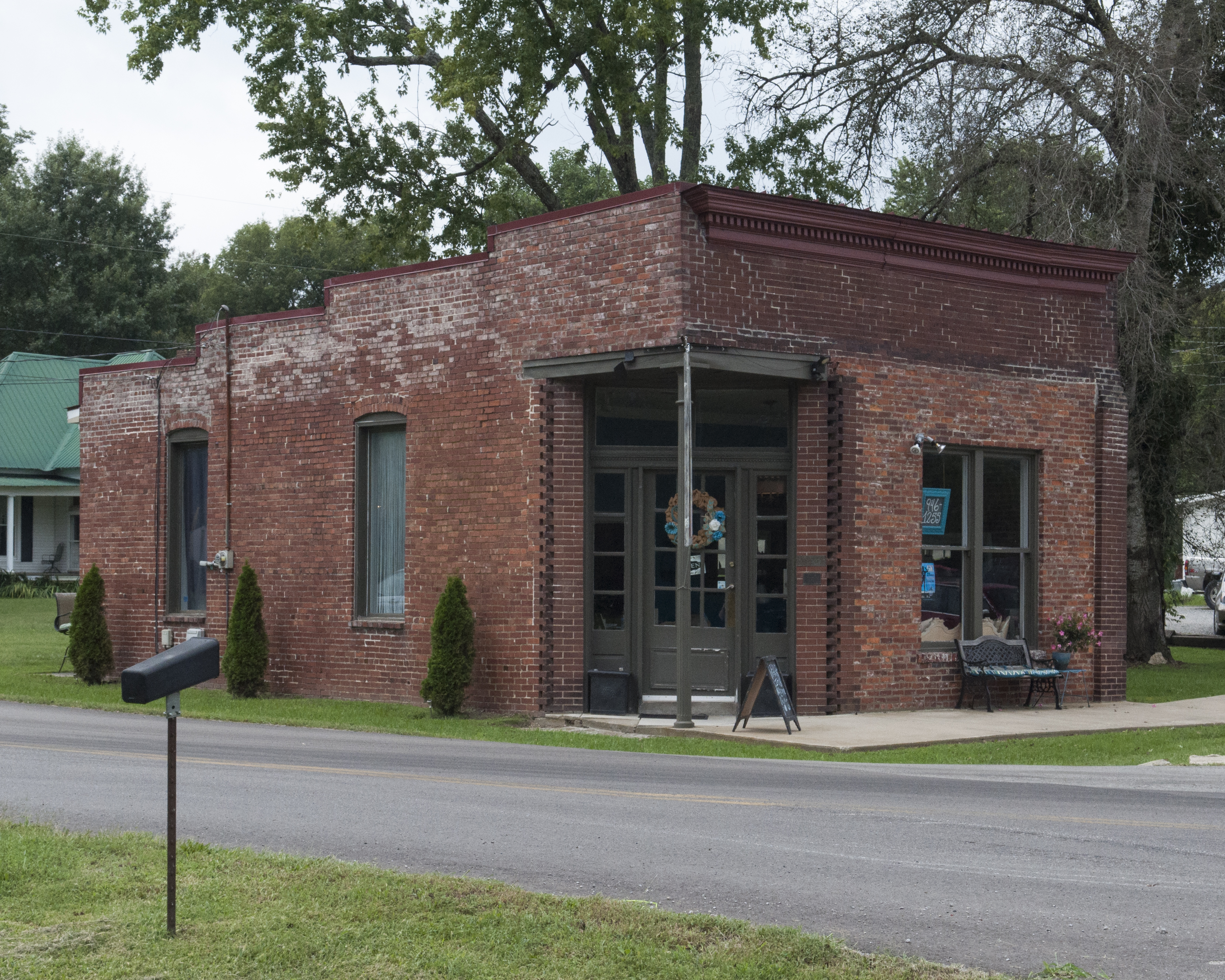

- Location within Tennessee Location within the United States
- Location: Thompson Station Rd., Thompsons Station, Tennessee
- Coordinates: 35°47′59″N 86°54′36″W
- Area: less than 1 acre (0.40 ha)
- Built: 1913 and 1927
- MPS: Williamson County MRA
- NRHP reference No.: 88000358
- Added to NRHP: April 13, 1988

Thompson Station Bank is a property in Thompsons Station, Tennessee, United States, with historical significance during period 1913–1927. The bank opened in 1913 but only lasted 13 years, and closed in 1927.

The building, built in 1913, was listed on the National Register of Historic Places (NRHP) in 1988. When listed the property included one contributing building, and one contributing structure.

The building is brick.

== See also ==
- Bank of Nolensville, a similar bank of the era, also NRHP-listed
