= Hiram Masonic Lodge No. 7 =

- U.S. National Register of Historic Places
- U.S. National Historic Landmark
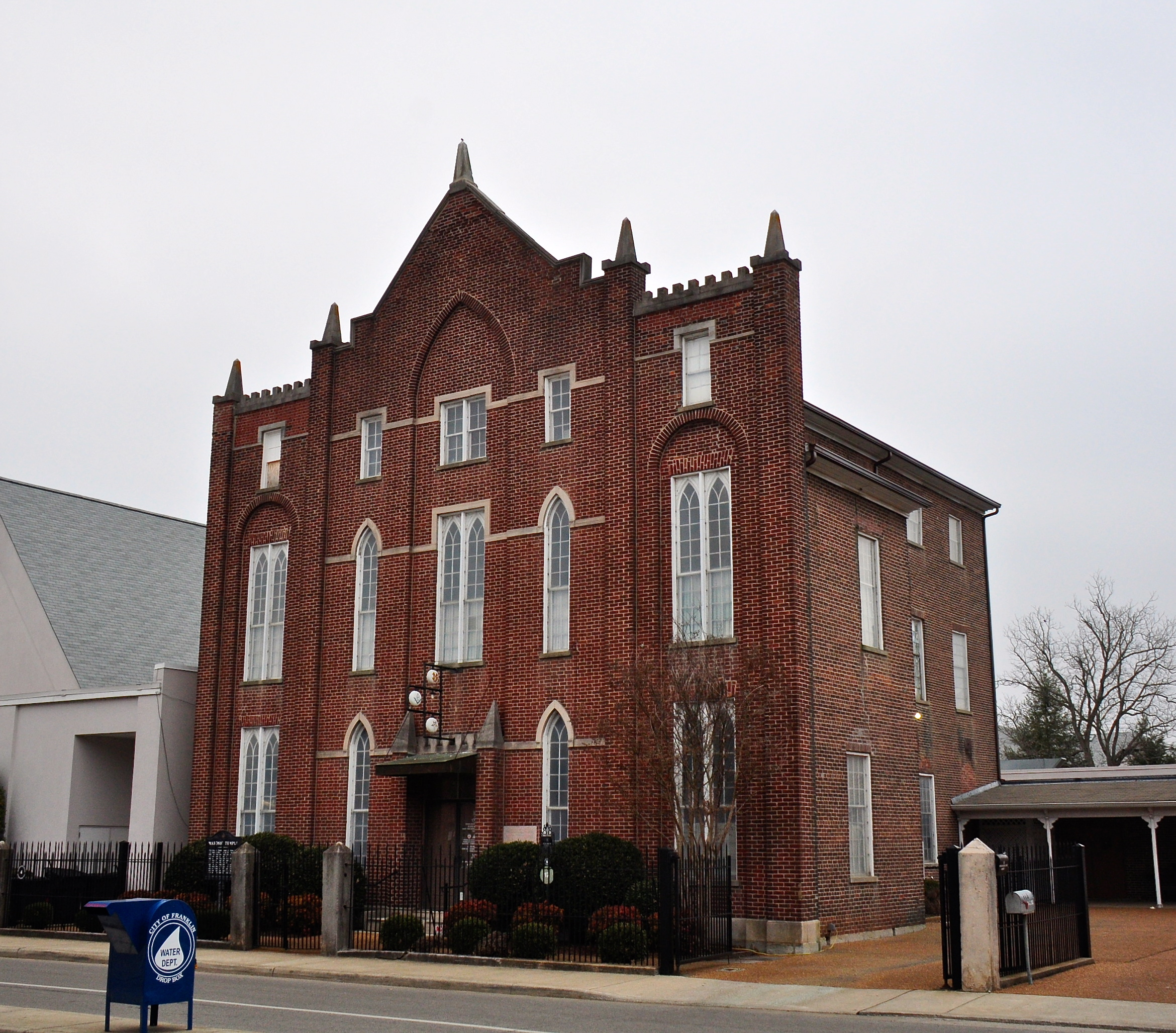
- Hiram Masonic Lodge No. 7, March 2014.

- Location within Tennessee Location within the United States
- Location: 115 S. 2nd Ave. South, Franklin, Tennessee
- Coordinates: 35°55′31″N 86°52′1″W
- Area: less than one acre
- Built: 1823
- Architectural style: Gothic Revival
- NRHP reference No.: 73001859

Significant dates
- Added to NRHP: November 7, 1973
- Designated NHL: November 7, 1973

The Masonic Hall of Hiram Masonic Lodge No. 7 is a historic Gothic Revival building on South 2nd Avenue in Franklin, Tennessee. Constructed in 1823, it is the oldest public building in Franklin. It is nationally significant as the site of negotiations leading to the Treaty of Franklin, the first Indian removal treaty agreed after passage of the 1830 Indian Removal Act. It was declared a National Historic Landmark in 1973. It continues to serve the local Masonic lodge.

== Description and history ==
The Hiram Masonic Lodge was the first three-story building constructed west of the Allegheny Mountains. It is located in downtown Franklin, on the east side of 2nd Avenue South, between Main and Church Streets. It is a three-story brick building with Gothic Revival features. The front facade is five bays wide, with a false front extending above the gabled roof to a crenellated parapet with pyramid-topped posts and a central gable. Windows on the facade are narrow lancet-arches, set in two-story round-arch panels in the outer bays, and in a lancet-arched bay in the center. The interior has large meeting spaces on the first two floors and offices and a meeting room styled for the York Rite on the third floor.

The building houses Hiram Lodge No. 7, founded in 1809. It was built in 1823, and is the oldest public building in Franklin and the oldest Masonic Hall in continuous use in Tennessee. In 1830, it was the site of negotiations between the Chickasaw Indians and a commission headed by President Andrew Jackson, which resulted in the Treaty of Franklin. This treaty, the first of the Indian removal agreements made in the wake of the 1830 Indian Removal Act, called for the Chickasaw to sell their lands and move west to today's Oklahoma. The treaty was never ratified, and the Chickasaw were later forced into the Treaty of Pontotoc Creek.

During the American Civil War, the building was used as a hospital for wounded Union soldiers after the Battle of Franklin.

== See also ==
- List of National Historic Landmarks in Tennessee
- National Register of Historic Places listings in Williamson County, Tennessee
