= Boston, Tennessee =

- Unincorporated community
- Location within Tennessee Location within the United States
- Coordinates: 35°50′34″N 87°01′57″W
- Country: United States
- State: Tennessee
- County: Williamson
- Elevation: 728 ft (222 m)
- Time zone: UTC-6 (Central (CST))
  - Summer (DST): UTC-5 (CDT)
- Area code(s): 615, 629
- GNIS feature ID: 1314718

Boston is an unincorporated community in Williamson County, Tennessee. Boston is 10.8 miles (17.4 km) west-southwest of Franklin. The Sparkman-Skelley Farm, which is listed on the National Register of Historic Places, is located in Boston.
