= James P. Johnson House =

Historic house in Tennessee, United States

- U.S. National Register of Historic Places
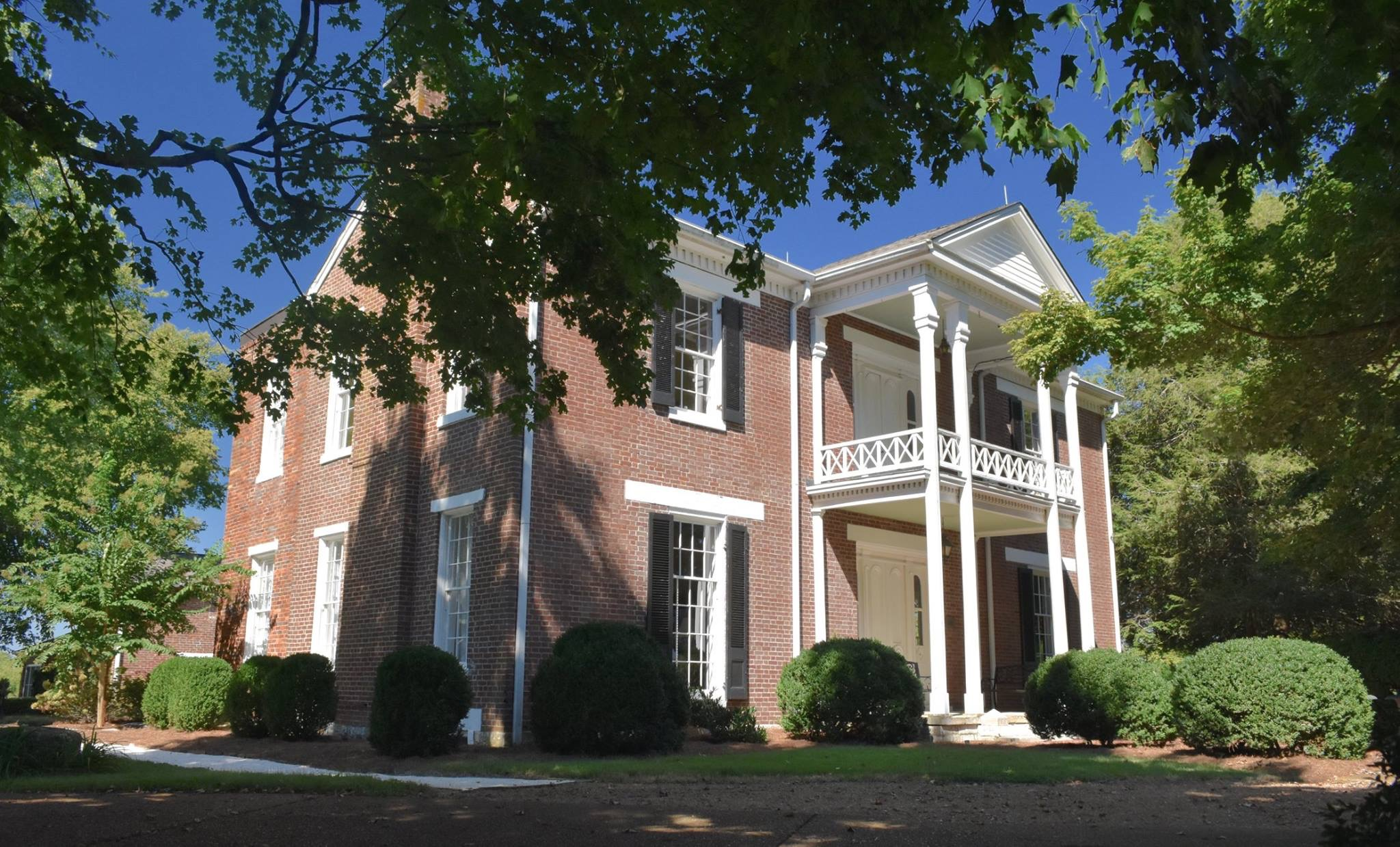
- House of James P. Johnson

- Location within Tennessee Location within the United States
- Location: US 31 3/10 mi. S of W. Harpeth Rd., Thompsons Station, Tennessee
- Coordinates: 35°50′29″N 86°52′58″W
- Area: 2 acres (0.81 ha)
- Built: 1854 and c. 1890
- Architectural style: Greek Revival, Central passage plan
- MPS: Williamson County MRA
- NRHP reference No.: 88000316
- Added to NRHP: April 13, 1988

The James P. Johnson House is a building and property in Thompsons Station, Tennessee, dating from 1854. It has been listed on the National Register of Historic Places since 1988. It has also been known as Laurel Hill. It includes Greek Revival and Central passage plan and other architecture.

The house is notable for its association with the Laurel Hill Stock Farm, a livestock farm founded in the 1830s by Thomas Johnson, which was later inherited by his son, James P. Johnson, in 1853. During the 1850s the farm was expanded to over 500 acres and is listed as one of the most successful farms in the county in the 1886 Goodspeed History.
