= H. G. W. Mayberry House =

Historic house in Tennessee, United States

- U.S. National Register of Historic Places
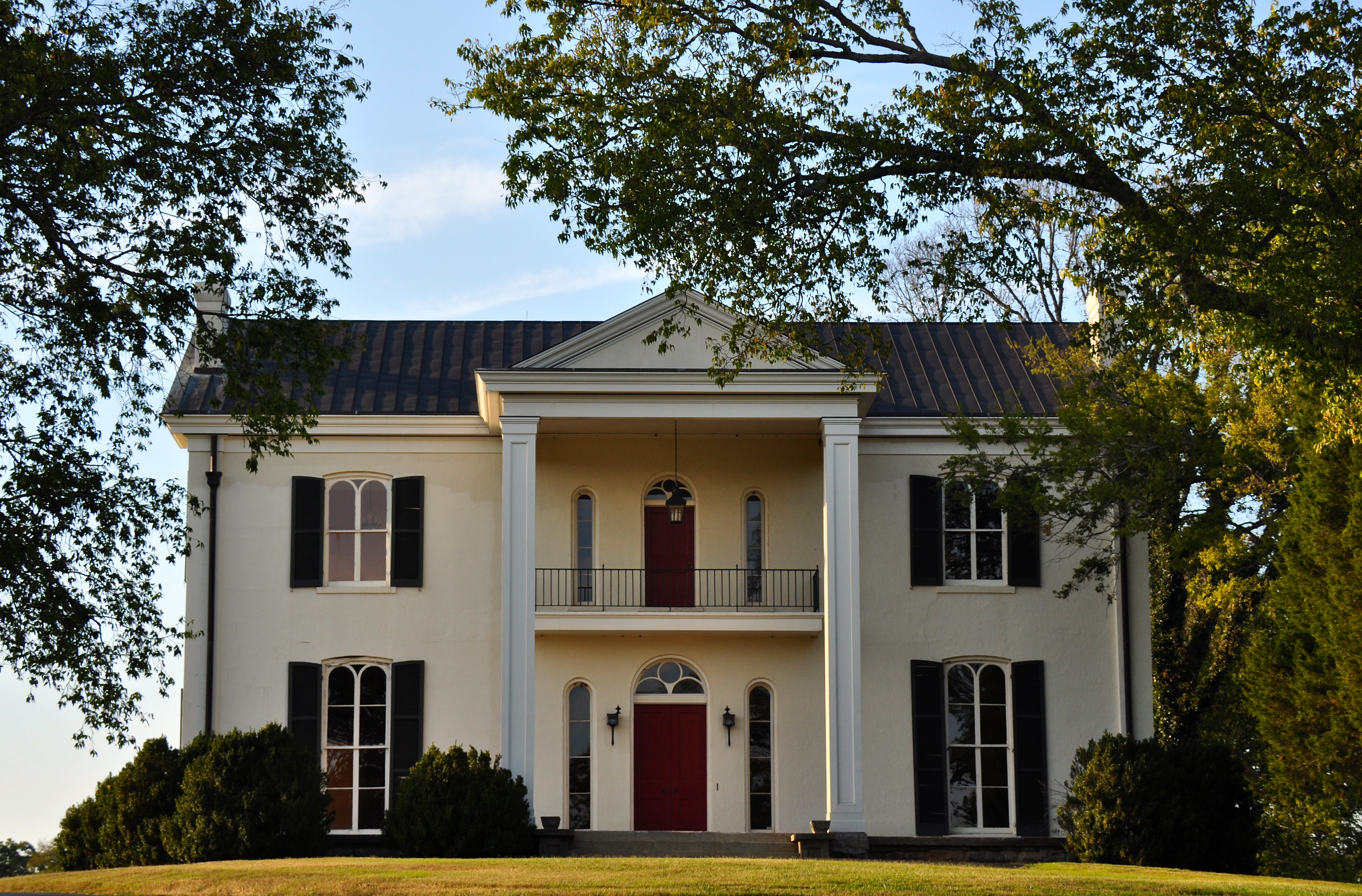
- H.G.W. Mayberry House, September 2014.

- Location within Tennessee Location within the United States
- Location: Bear Creek Rd. 1/2 mi. W of Carters Creek Pike, Franklin, Tennessee
- Coordinates: 35°52′9″N 86°58′7″W
- Area: 2.2 acres (0.89 ha)
- Built: 1856
- Architect: Lilly, Pryor
- Architectural style: Greek Revival and Italianate
- MPS: Williamson County MRA
- NRHP reference No.: 88000363
- Added to NRHP: April 13, 1988

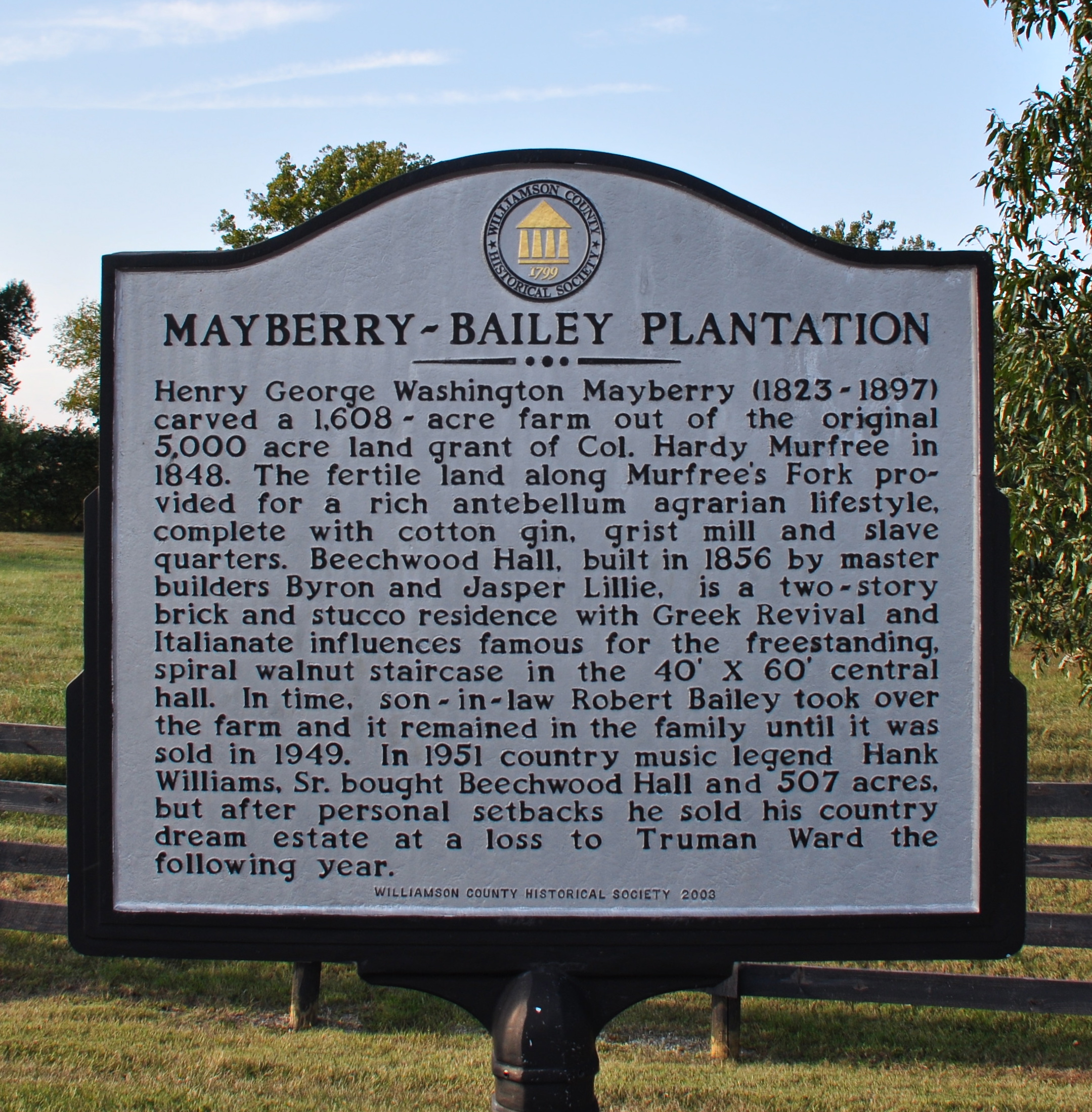
Williamson County Historical Marker - Mayberry-Bailey Plantation

The H. G. W. Mayberry House, also known as Beechwood Hall, is a historic antebellum plantation house built in 1856 in Franklin, Tennessee.

== Plantation house ==
Beechwood Hall was the manor house of one of the three largest plantations in Williamson, prior to the American Civil War. It had more than 1,000 acres (400 ha) in area, and had many enslaved people laboring on it. The mansion's original owners were Sophronia Hunter Mayberry and Henry George Washington Mayberry.

It includes Greek Revival and Italianate style architectural elements.

The other two contenders for Williamson County's largest plantation are those of the Samuel F. Glass House plantation, and the "Ravenswood" plantation (James H. Wilson House), both also NRHP-listed.

The house was owned at various times by country music singers Hank Williams Sr., Tim McGraw and Faith Hill.

== See also ==
- Henry H. Mayberry House
- National Register of Historic Places listings in Franklin County, Tennessee
