= James Giddens House =

Historic house in Tennessee, United States

- U.S. National Register of Historic Places
- Location within Tennessee Location within the United States
- Location: Farm Ln. at N boundary of Thompsons Station, Thompsons Station, Tennessee
- Coordinates: 35°48′2″N 86°55′16″W
- Area: 4.6 acres (1.9 ha)
- Built: c.1900, 1907 and c.1920
- Architectural style: Classical Revival
- MPS: Williamson County MRA
- NRHP reference No.: 88000301
- Added to NRHP: April 13, 1988

The James Giddens House is a property in Thompsons Station, Tennessee, United States, that dates from c.1900 and that was listed on the National Register of Historic Places in 1988. It has also been known as Moss Side Farm. It includes Classical Revival architecture. When listed the property included two contributing buildings and two contributing structures on an area of 4.6 acres (1.9 ha).

The NRHP-eligibility of the property was covered in a 1988 study of Williamson County historical resources.
