= Triune Fortification =

- U.S. National Register of Historic Places
- Location: Address Restricted, Arrington, Tennessee
- Area: 502 acres (203 ha)
- Built: 1863
- MPS: Civil War Historic and Historic Archeological Resources in Tennessee MPS
- NRHP reference No.: 99000137
- Added to NRHP: February 5, 1999

Triune Fortification is a historic site in or near Arrington, Tennessee that was listed on the National Register of Historic Places in 1999. It has significance from American Civil War activity there in 1863. When listed the property included four contributing structures and ten non-contributing buildings on 502 acres (203 ha).

In 2008, it was advocated that a conservation easement to preserve the property should be created. The Triune fortifications were asserted to be "one of the most intact and unaltered set[s] of Civil War earthworks in Tennessee."

== See also ==
- Roper's Knob Fortifications
