= Adams Street Historic District =

Historic district in Tennessee, United States

- U.S. National Register of Historic Places
- U.S. Historic district
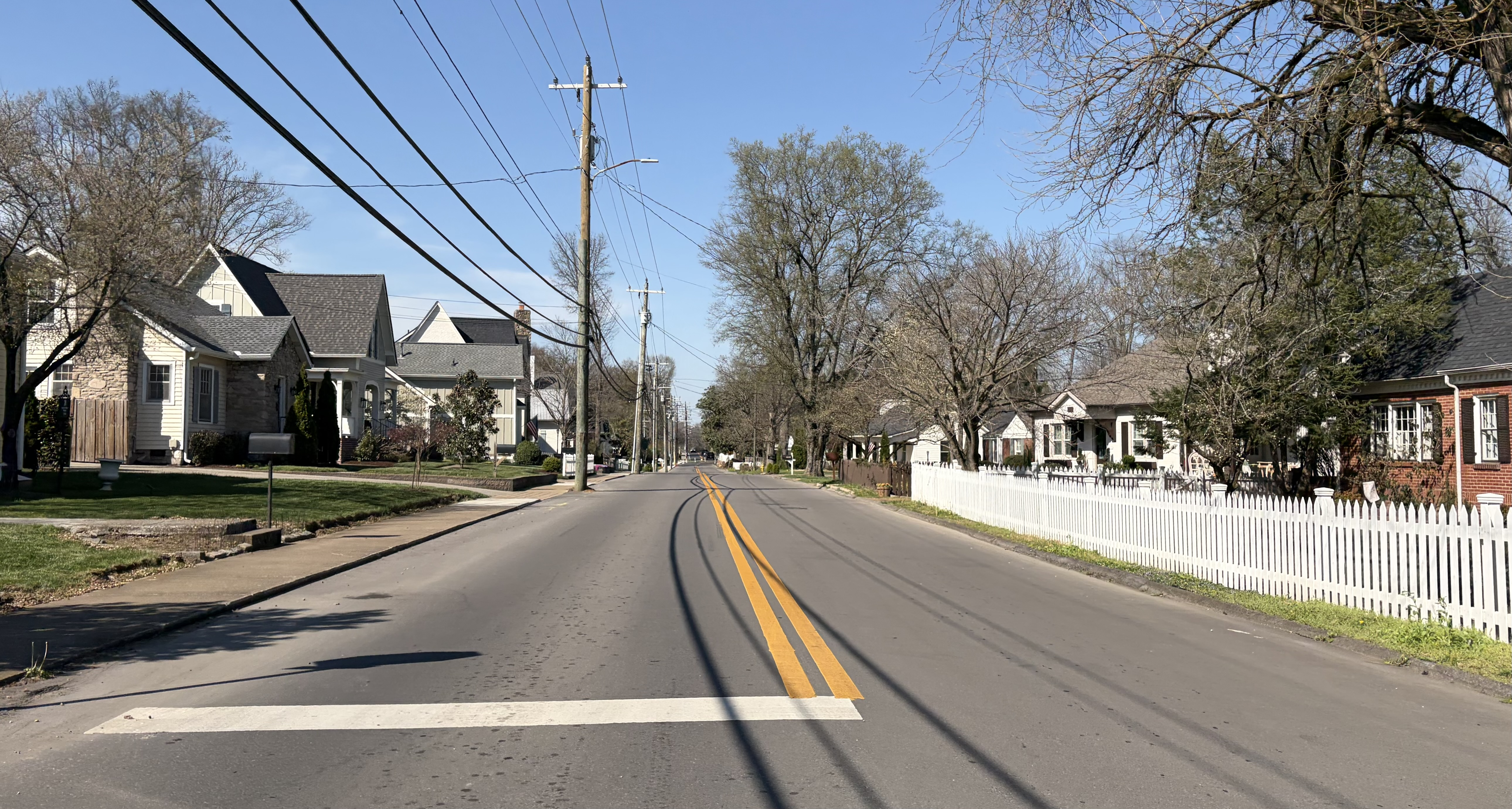
- Houses on Adams Street

- Location within Tennessee Location within the United States
- Location: 1112-1400 Adams, 1251-1327 Adams St., and 304-308 Stewart St., Franklin, Tennessee
- Area: 14 acres (5.7 ha)
- Architectural style: Bungalow/Craftsman, Folk Victorian
- MPS: Williamson County MRA
- NRHP reference No.: 00000233
- Added to NRHP: March 15, 2000

The Adams Street Historic District in Franklin, Tennessee consists of properties at 1112-1400 Adams, 1251-1327 Adams St., and 304-308 Stewart St. It is a 14-acre (5.7 ha) historic district was listed on the National Register of Historic Places in 2000 and is one of seven local historic districts in the city of Franklin.

The historic district is a residential neighborhood where most of the homes were built between the 1890s and 1930s. The neighborhood was built on farmland outside of the original borders of the town of Franklin. The earlier buildings in the district are mostly single-story frame construction in the Folk Victorian style, including some Queen Anne and Italianate details. Some homes from the 1920s and 1930s are built in the bungalow style. The 14-acre (5.7 ha) district listed on the National Register includes 37 contributing buildings and 16 non-contributing buildings.

The majority of homes built on Adams Street in the era were one-story Folk Victorian frame houses with Queen Anne and Italianate details. Among these, many are of the "gabled ell" form, which has a projecting gable bay on the front facade and a decorative porch. Examples include 1891-built 1303 Adams Street and the houses at 306 and 308 Stewart Street built c.1910.

The district includes Bungalow/Craftsman architecture, including a one-and-a-half-story gable-front home at 1246 Adams Street built c.1930, and also houses at 1238 and 1242 Adams Street.

The Adams Street historic district is one of five National Register historic districts in the city of Franklin. Four of these, including Adams Street, are also designated as local historic districts by city ordinance, making them subject to design review. Franklin has seven local historic districts.
