= Natchez Street Historic District =

Historic district in Tennessee, United States

- U.S. National Register of Historic Places
- U.S. Historic district
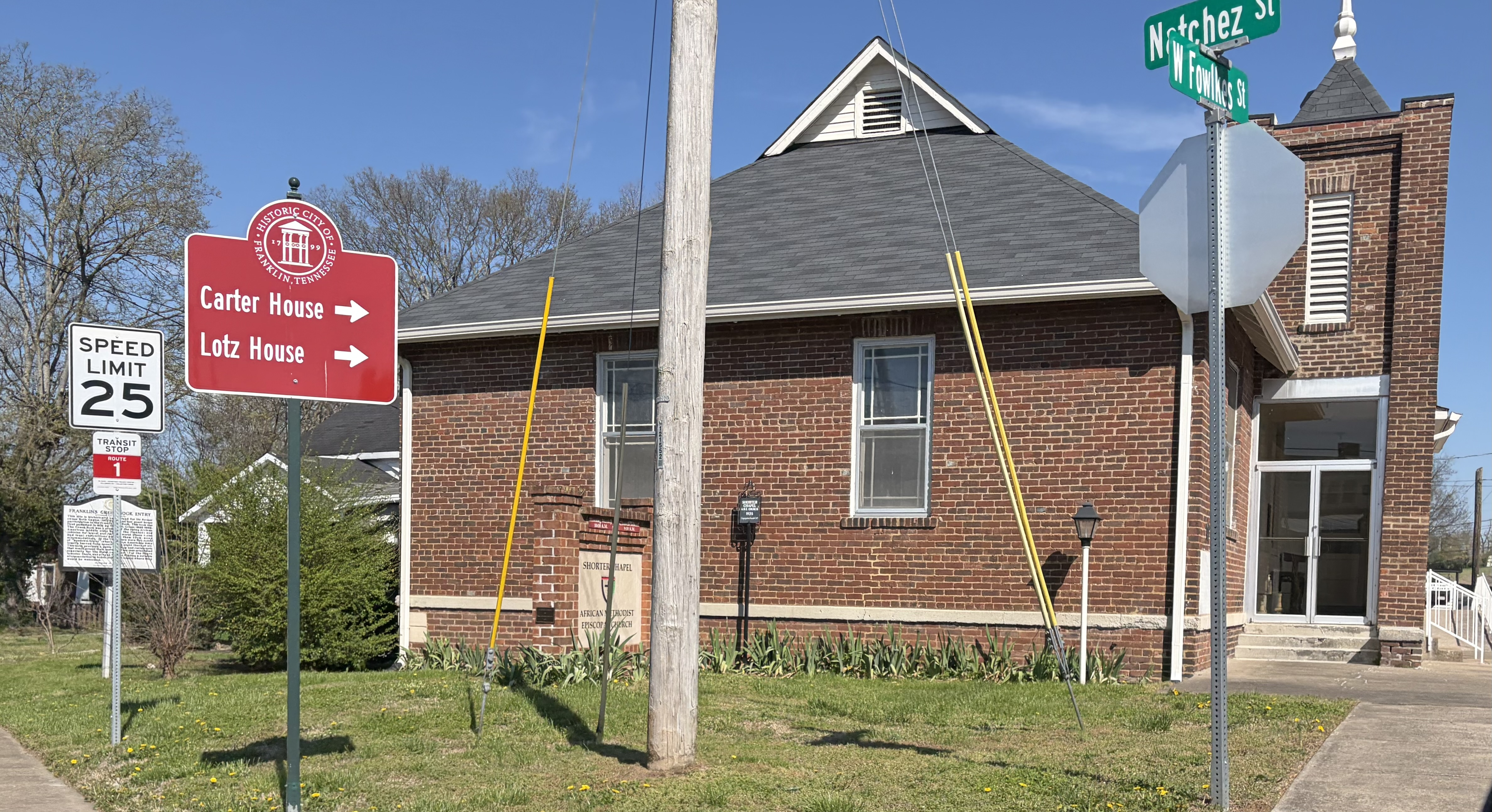
- Shorter Chapel A.M.E. Church, a contributing property to the historic district

- Location within Tennessee Location within the United States
- Location: Roughly bounded by Columbia Ave., Granbury St., and W. Main St., Franklin, Tennessee
- Coordinates: 35°55′04″N 86°52′41″W
- Area: 25 acres (10 ha)
- Built: 1881, 1907 and 1925
- Architectural style: Bungalow/Craftsman, Shotgun
- NRHP reference No.: 04000030
- Added to NRHP: February 11, 2004

Natchez Street Historic District is a 25-acre (10 ha) historic district in Franklin, Tennessee, that was listed on the National Register of Historic Places in 2004.

It includes an area also known as Baptist Neck. Years of historic significance for the district include 1881, 1907, and 1925. It includes Shotgun and Bungalow/Craftsman architecture. When listed, the district included 65 contributing buildings, eight contributing objects and 27 non-contributing buildings, over its 25-acre (10 ha) area.

The Natchez Street historic district is one of five National Register historic districts in the city of Franklin. Unlike the other four National Register historic districts in the city, this district is not also designated as local historic districts by city ordinance, so it is not subject to local design review. Franklin has seven local historic districts.
