= Joseph Wilson House =

Historic house in Tennessee, United States

- Formerly listed on the U.S. National Register of Historic Places
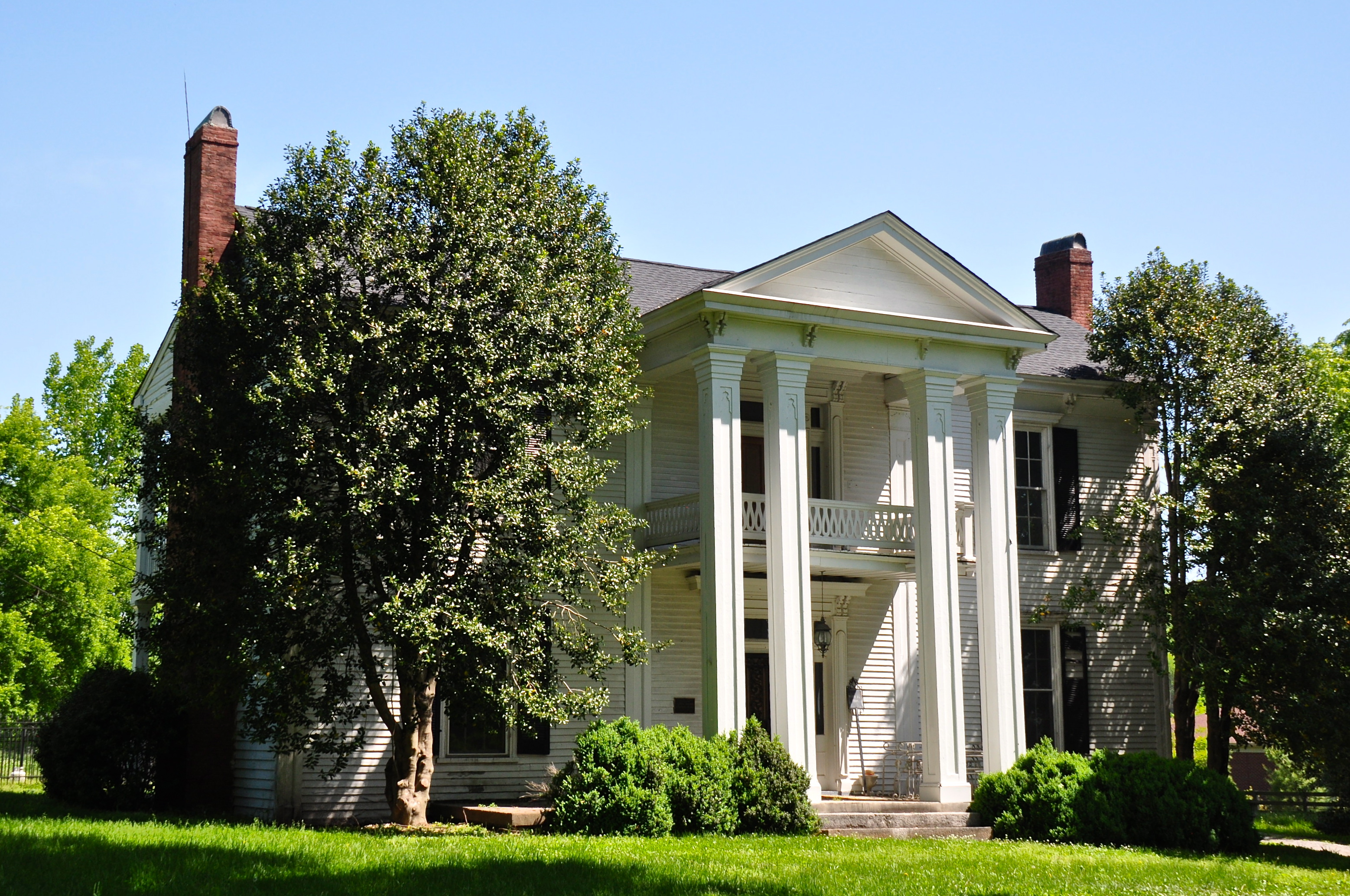
- Joseph Wilson House, May 2014.

- Location within Tennessee Location within the United States
- Location: Clovercroft Rd. 2/10 mi. W of Wilson Pike, Franklin, Tennessee
- Coordinates: 35°55′20″N 86°46′8″W
- Area: 9.5 acres (3.8 ha)
- Built: c. 1861
- Architectural style: Greek Revival, Central passage ell plan
- MPS: Williamson County MRA
- NRHP reference No.: 88000372

Significant dates
- Added to NRHP: April 13, 1988
- Removed from NRHP: November 13, 2017

The Joseph Wilson House was a property in Franklin, Tennessee built in c.1861. It was listed on the National Register of Historic Places in 1988. The house was destroyed by fire on August 30, 2016, and was subsequently removed from the National Register.
