= Nicholas Tate Perkins House =

Historic house in Tennessee, United States

- U.S. National Register of Historic Places
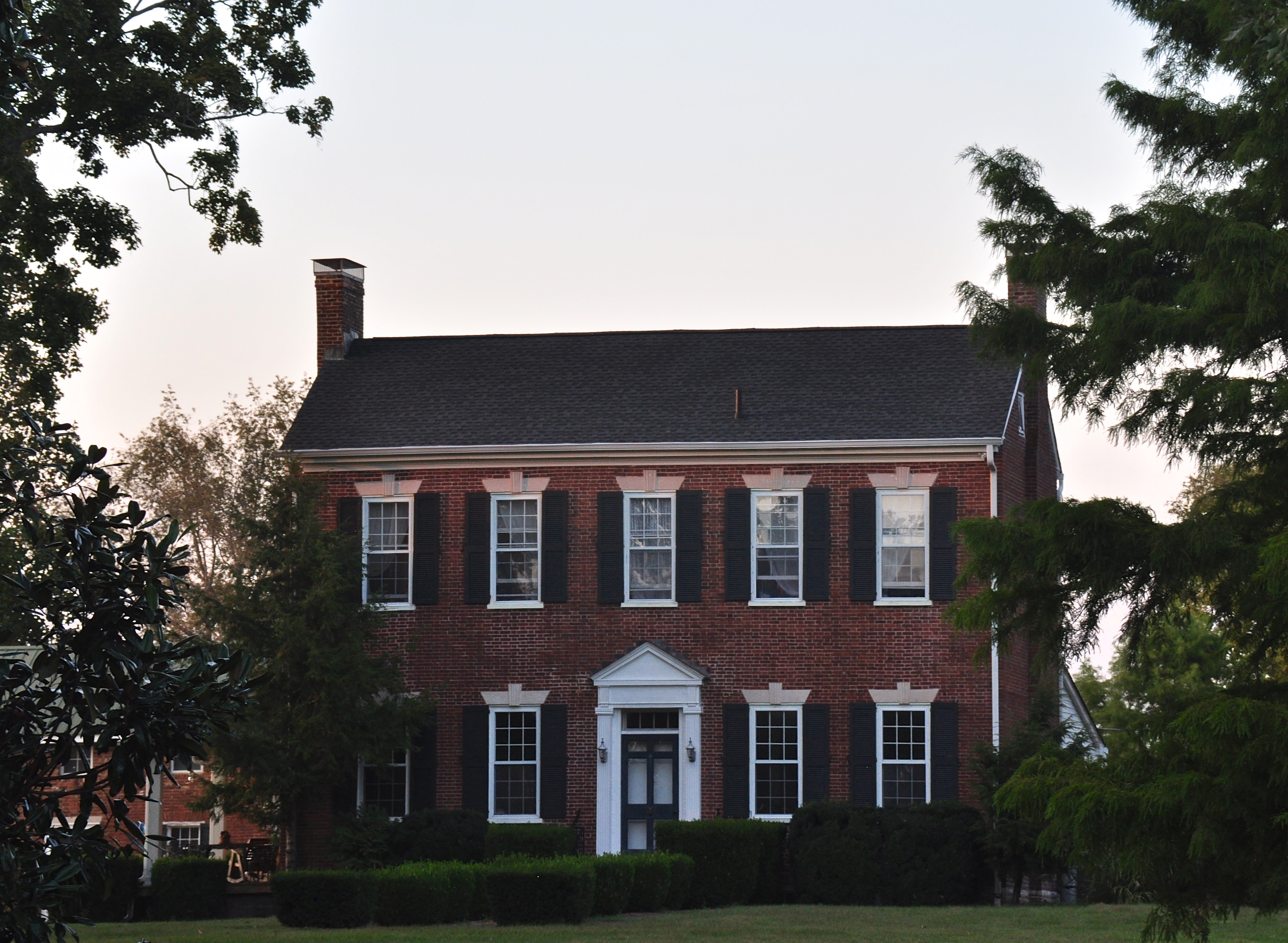
- Nicholas Tate Perkins House, September 2014.

- Location within Tennessee Location within the United States
- Location: Del Rio Pike 2/10 mi. W of Cotton Rd., Franklin, Tennessee
- Coordinates: 35°57′35″N 86°54′30″W
- Area: 3.4 acres (1.4 ha)
- Built: c. 1820
- Architectural style: Federal, Central passage plan
- MPS: Williamson County MRA
- NRHP reference No.: 88000330
- Added to NRHP: April 13, 1988

The Nicholas Tate Perkins House is a property in Franklin, Tennessee, United States, that was listed on the National Register of Historic Places in 1988. The property is also known as Two Rivers. It was built or has other significance as of c.1820. It includes Central passage plan and other architecture. When listed the property included two contributing buildings and one non-contributing structure, on an area of 3.4 acres (1.4 ha). The property was covered in a 1988 study of Williamson County historical resources.
