= Rainey House (Franklin, Tennessee) =

Historic house in Tennessee, United States

- U.S. National Register of Historic Places
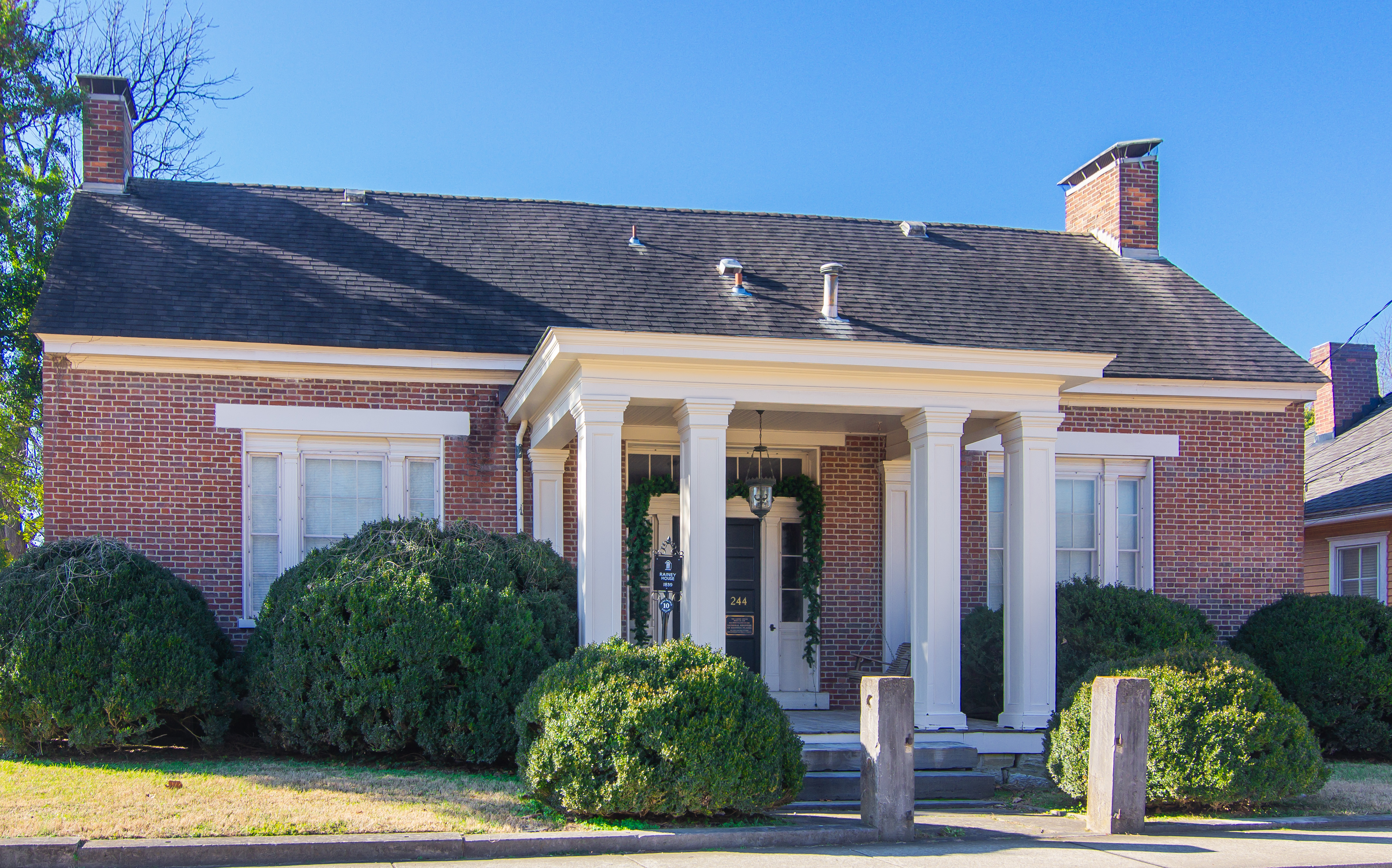
- Rainey House

- Location within Tennessee Location within the United States
- Location: 244 1st Ave., Franklin, Tennessee
- Coordinates: 35.92379°N 86.86456°W
- Area: 9.9 acres (4.0 ha)
- Built: 1839
- Architectural style: Federal with Greek Revival Elements
- NRHP reference No.: 70000621
- Added to NRHP: July 8, 1970

The Rainey House is a one-and-a-half-story brick home in Franklin, Tennessee that dates from 1839. It was built in the original 15 blocks of the city of Franklin and was standing during the American Civil War Battle of Franklin. Like many structures standing at the time, it was used as a field hospital during and after the battle.

It was listed on the National Register of Historic Places in 1970. The house is listed as being one of the least-altered historic properties in Franklin. It was originally built by Robert Rainey who operated a store across the street from the City of Franklin Railroad Depot. While the depot is no longer in service, the train line across the street from the house is still active.

A bridge across the Harpeth River located on the other side of the railroad tracks from the house leads to Pinkerton Park where there is a short hike up to Fort Granger, a Union Fort used during the Civil War.

When listed the property included two contributing buildings on an area of 9.9 acres (4.0 ha). It has also been known as The Bob Rainey House.

The house has Greek Revival details.
