= Homestead Manor =

Historic house in Tennessee, United States

- U.S. National Register of Historic Places
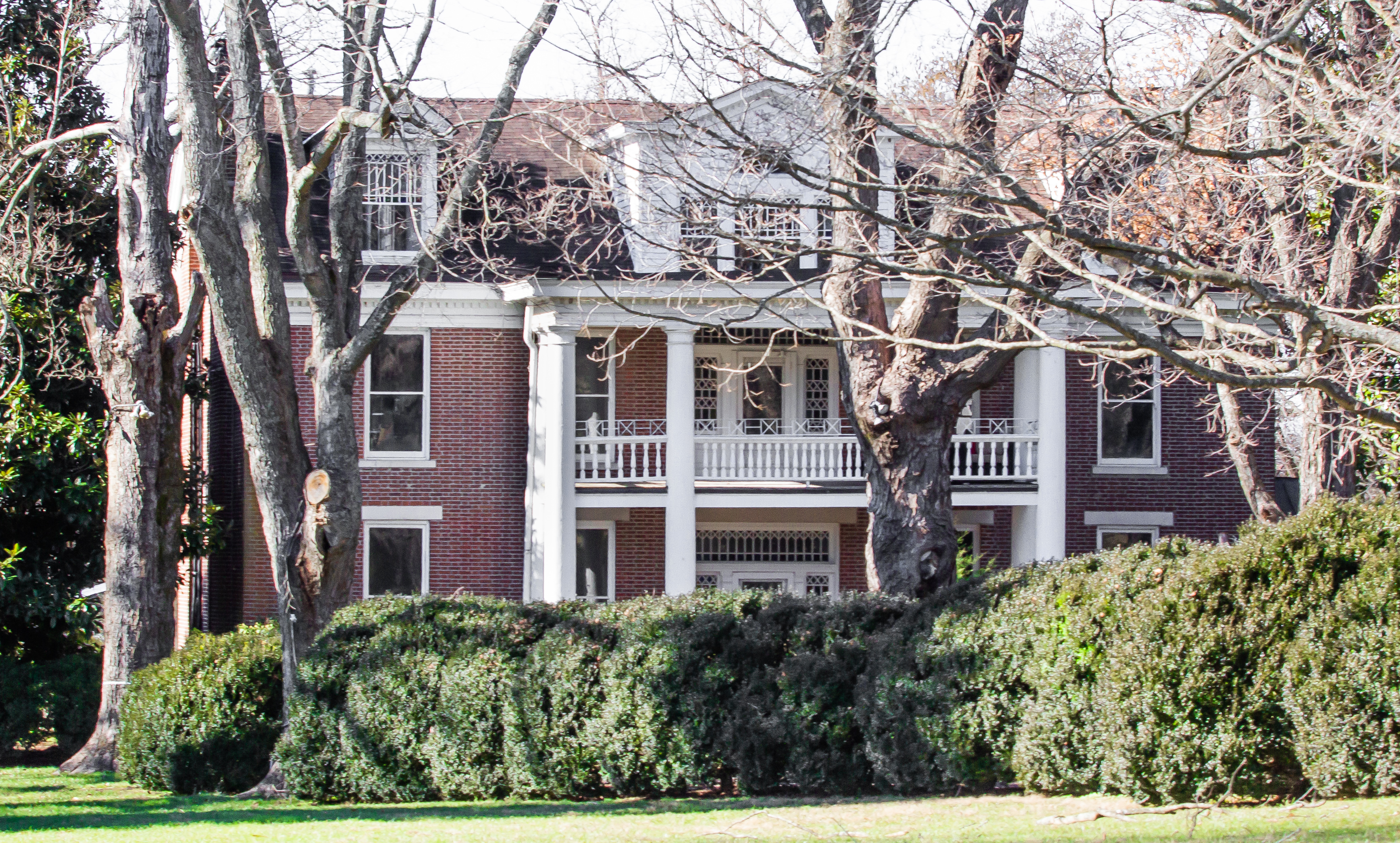
- Homestead Manor

- Location within Tennessee Location within the United States
- Location: N of Thompson Station on U.S. 31, Thompson's Station, Tennessee
- Coordinates: 35°48′23″N 86°54′9″W
- Area: 5 acres (2.0 ha)
- Built: 1809, 1819 and 1863
- Architects: Giddens, Francis
- Architectural style: Georgian
- NRHP reference No.: 77001300
- Added to NRHP: April 29, 1977

Homestead Manor is a property in Thompson Station, Tennessee. Construction of the manor began in 1809 by Mr. and Mrs. Francis Giddens on land granted by Revolutionary War Grant, and was completed in 1819.

Homestead Manor features Georgian architecture that can be traced back to Francis Giddens' appreciation for his heritage in Louisa County, Virginia.

Between 2015 and 2019, the property served as a restaurant. Presently, it serves as both an event venue and a coffee shop. The coffee shop, known as "1819," pays tribute to the year when the manor's construction was finalized

There is a 50-acre conservation easement.
