= Fernvale, Tennessee =

- Unincorporated community
- Location within Tennessee Location within the United States
- Coordinates: 35°57′16″N 87°04′45″W
- Country: United States
- State: Tennessee
- County: Williamson
- Elevation: 620 ft (190 m)
- Time zone: UTC-6 (Central (CST))
  - Summer (DST): UTC-5 (CDT)
- Area code: 615
- GNIS feature ID: 1315052

Fernvale is an unincorporated community in western Williamson County, Tennessee. Fernvale is 12 miles (19 km) west of Franklin. The Harpeth Furnace, which is listed on the National Register of Historic Places, is located in Fernvale.

== Notable people ==
- Bill Lee, 50th Governor of Tennessee
