= Harpeth Furnace =

- Harpeth Furnace (40WM83)
- U.S. National Register of Historic Places
- Location: Address Restricted, Fernvale, Tennessee
- Area: 10 acres (4.0 ha)
- MPS: Iron Industry on the Western Highland Rim 1790s-1920s MPS
- NRHP reference No.: 88000253
- Added to NRHP: April 11, 1988

Harpeth Furnace is an archeological site in or near Fernvale in Williamson County, Tennessee, United States. It was listed on the National Register of Historic Places in 1988, as Harpeth Furnace (40WM83); 40WM83 is the Smithsonian trinomial code for the site.

The listing was for an area of 10 acres (4.0 ha) with just one contributing site.

The property was covered in a Multiple Property Submission study of "Historic and Historic Archaeological Resources of the Iron Industry on the Western Highland Rim 1790s - 1920s" and/or an extension of that study.
