= Robert Hodge House =

Historic house in Tennessee, United States

- U.S. National Register of Historic Places
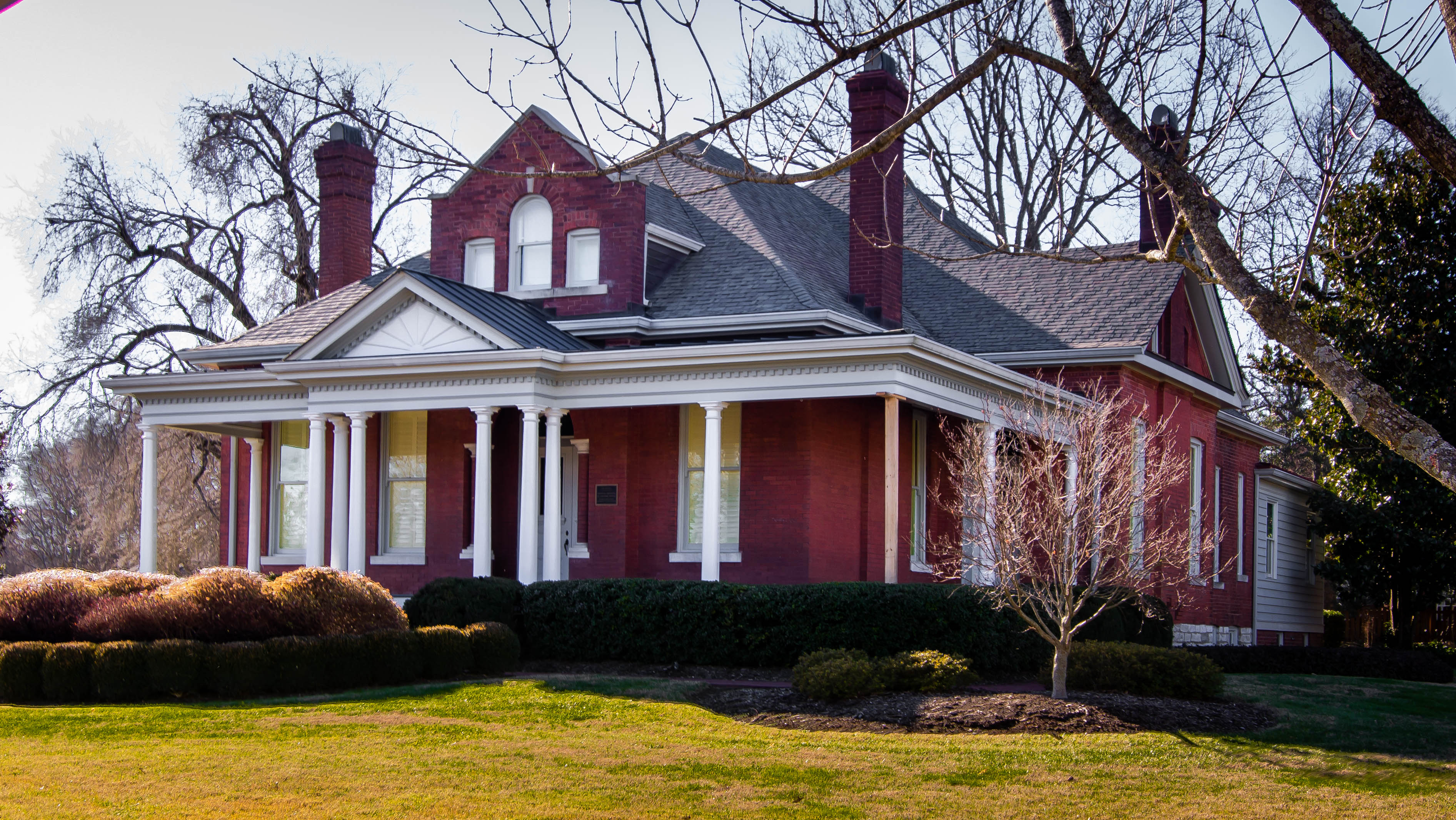
- Robert Hodge House

- Location within Tennessee Location within the United States
- Location: 409 Madison Court, Franklin, Tennessee
- Coordinates: 35°53′26″N 86°51′12″W
- Area: 1.1 acres (0.45 ha)
- Built: c.1900
- Architectural style: Queen Anne and Colonial Revival
- MPS: Williamson County MRA
- NRHP reference No.: 05001224
- Added to NRHP: November 9, 2005

The Robert Hodge House, also known as Sullivan Farm House, is a c. 1900 Queen Anne and Colonial Revival house in Franklin, Tennessee.

It was listed on the National Register of Historic Places in 2005. When listed the property included one contributing building and one non-contributing building, on 1.1 acres (0.45 ha).

The property's listing is identified by the National Register as consistent with historic resource standards covered in a 1988 study of Williamson County historical resources.
