= Oak Hall (Brentwood, Tennessee) =

Historic house in Tennessee, United States

- U.S. National Register of Historic Places
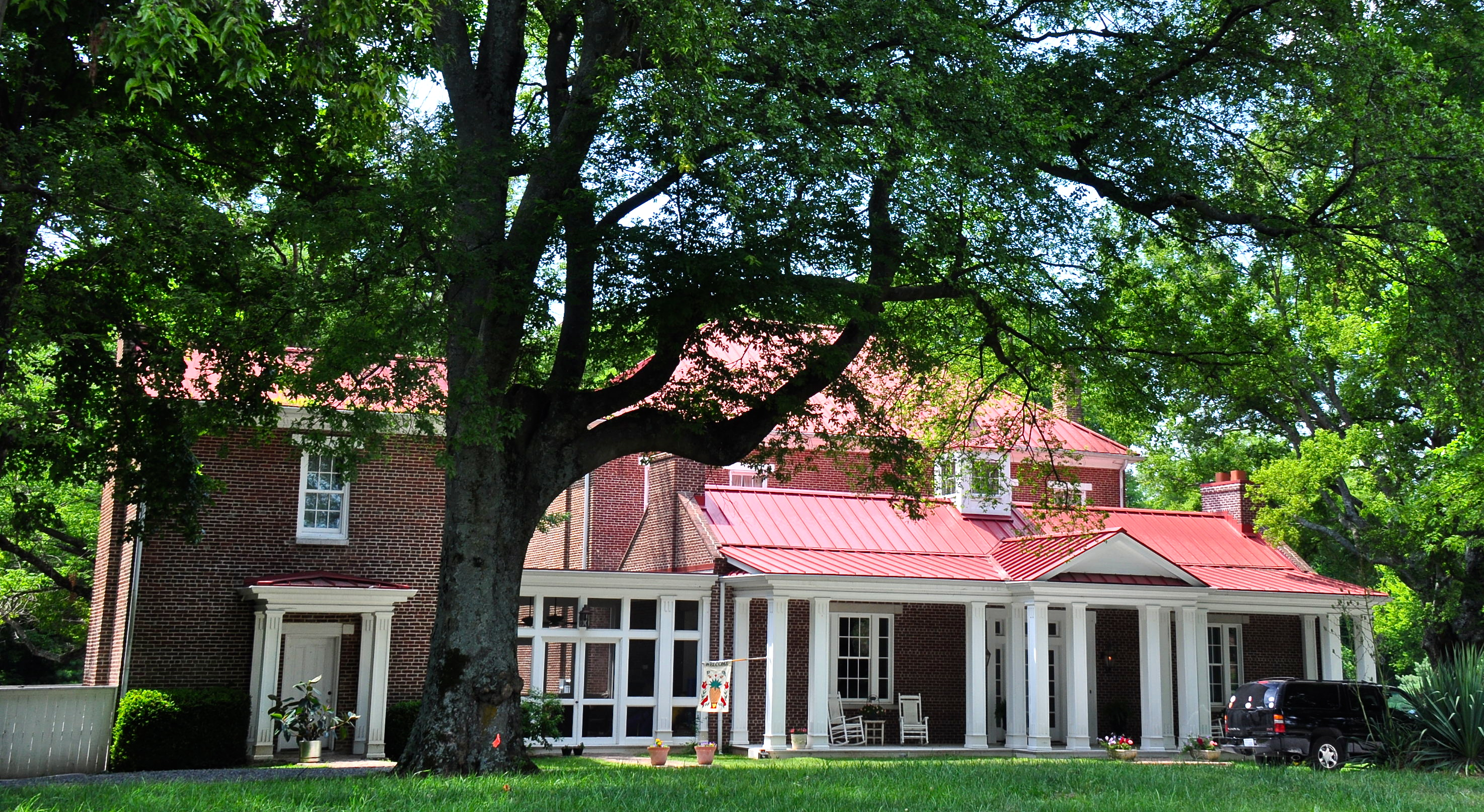
- Oak Hall, July 2014

- Location within Tennessee Location within the United States
- Location: 1704 Wilson Pike, Brentwood, Tennessee
- Coordinates: 35°57′46″N 86°46′10″W
- Area: 1.3 acres (0.53 ha)
- Built: 1845
- NRHP reference No.: 86000393
- Added to NRHP: March 13, 1986

Oak Hall is a building and property on Wilson Pike in Brentwood, Tennessee that dates from 1845 and was listed on the National Register of Historic Places in 1986. It has also been known as Century Oak.

It was built by James Hazard Wilson II, grandson of Thomas Wilson, an early settler of Williamson County. James Wilson was the namesake of Wilson Pike, who had originally built a log home, then built Ravenswood in 1825. Oak Hall and another home, Inglehame (historically known as Harpeth), were built by Wilson for his children, Samuel Wilson and James Hazard Wilson III, respectively.
