= Nolensville School =

- Historic Nolensville School
- U.S. National Register of Historic Places
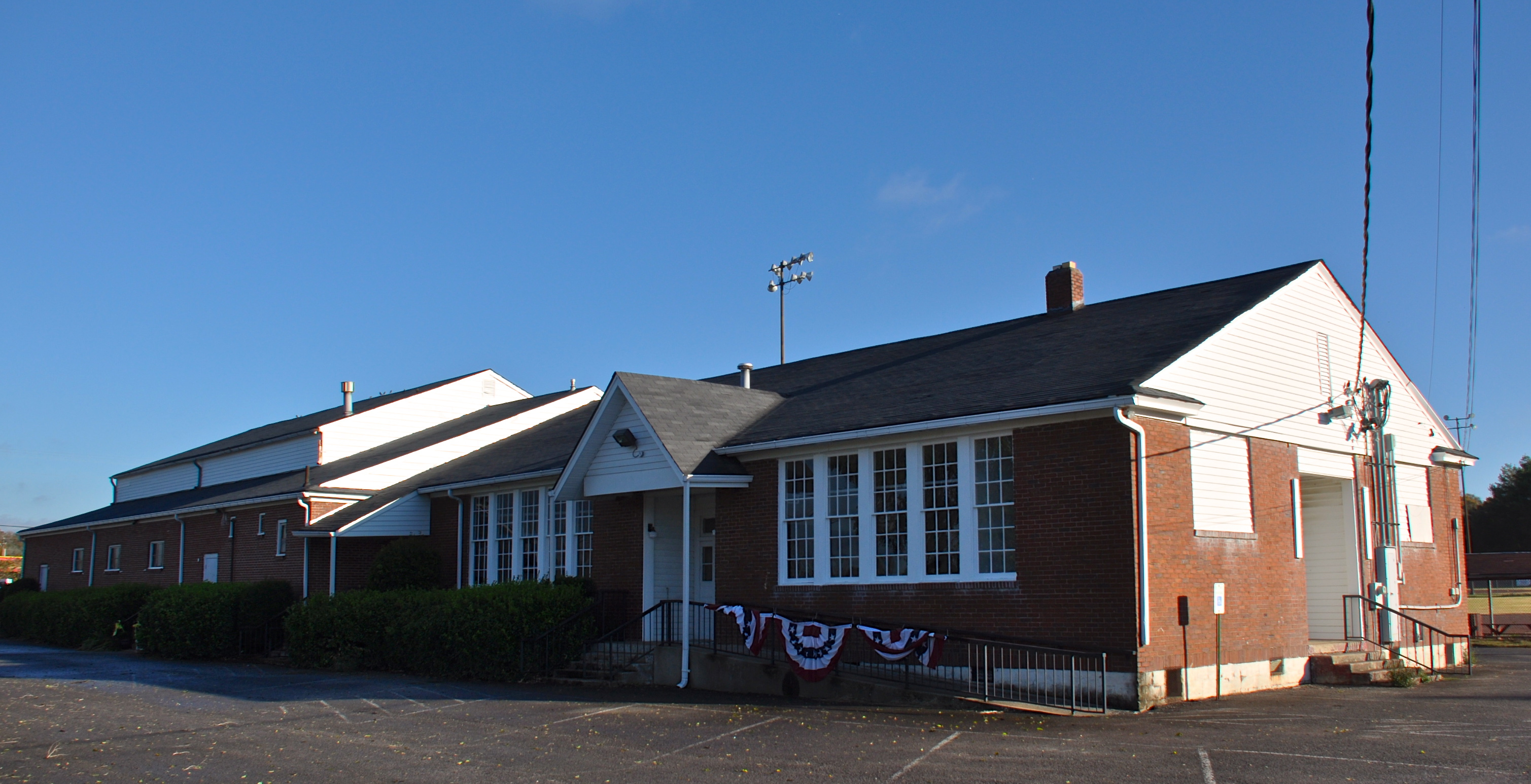
- Historic Nolensville School in November 2013.

- Location within Tennessee Location within the United States
- Location: 7248 Nolensville Road, Nolensville, Tennessee
- Coordinates: 35°57′35″N 86°40′21″W
- Area: less than 4 acres (1.6 ha)
- Built: 1937
- Built by: Potts, H.J. and Hughes, Harvell
- Architectural style: Rosenwald school
- NRHP reference No.: 85000686
- Added to NRHP: March 20, 2012

The Historic Nolensville School, is a former public school in Nolensville, Tennessee, that had for many years served as the community's recreation center (the Nolensville Recreation Center).

The school was built in 1937. It was the "first modern educational building" in Nolensville and is unusual as the only school for white people in Tennessee that was built to a Rosenwald School plan. African American students did not attend the school until it was integrated in 1966.

A gymnasium was added in 1948. The building became a community recreation center in 1972 after a new school was built to replace it. In 2009, after the town of Nolensville announced plans to convert the 1972 school into a new recreation center, the Nolensville Historical Society began a campaign to preserve the old Nolensville School for use as a community center. The building was listed on the National Register of Historic Places on March 20, 2012.
