= Sparkman–Skelley Farm =

- U.S. National Register of Historic Places
- Location within Tennessee Location within the United States
- Location: 5540 Leiper's Creek Rd., Boston, Tennessee
- Coordinates: 35°51′11″N 87°2′15″W
- Area: 94 acres (38 ha)
- Built: c.1846
- Architectural style: Italianate and Greek Revival
- MPS: Williamson County MRA
- NRHP reference No.: 00000234
- Added to NRHP: March 27, 2000

The Sparkman–Skelley Farm is a property in Boston, Tennessee that was listed on the National Register of Historic Places in 2000. It has also been known as Sparkman Farm and as Skelley Farm. It dates from c.1846.

It includes Italianate and Greek Revival architecture. When listed the property included four contributing buildings, one contributing structure, and one non-contributing building on an area of 94 acres (38 ha).

The NRHP eligibility of the property was covered in a 1988 study of Williamson County historical resources.
