= Triangle School =

- U.S. National Register of Historic Places
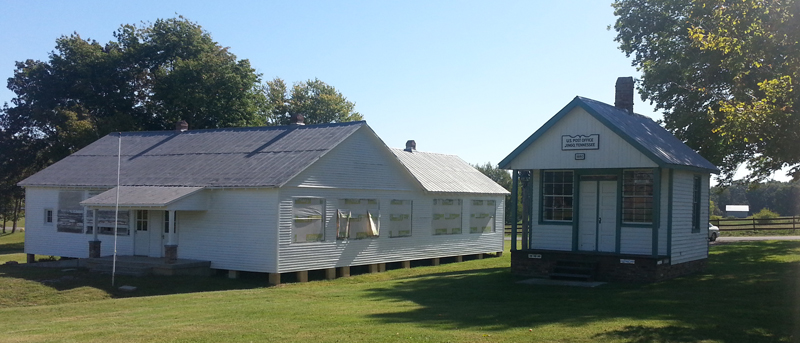

- Location within Tennessee Location within the United States
- Location: Fairview Blvd., Fairview, Tennessee
- Coordinates: 35°56′29″N 87°8′58″W
- Area: 3.5 acres (1.4 ha)
- Built: 1938
- Architect: Johnston, W.L.; Sweeney, B.B.
- Architectural style: Colonial Revival
- MPS: Williamson County MRA
- NRHP reference No.: 07000663
- Added to NRHP: July 3, 2007

The Triangle School is a property in Fairview, Tennessee that was listed on the National Register of Historic Places in 2007. It has also been known as New Union Valley School.

It was built in 1938 and includes Colonial Revival architecture.

The NRHP eligibility of the property was addressed in a 1988 study of Williamson County historical resources.

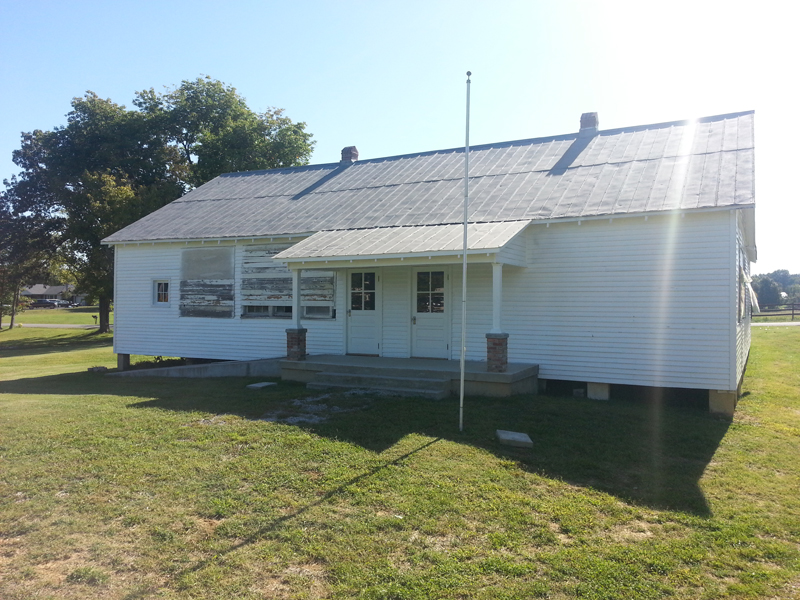

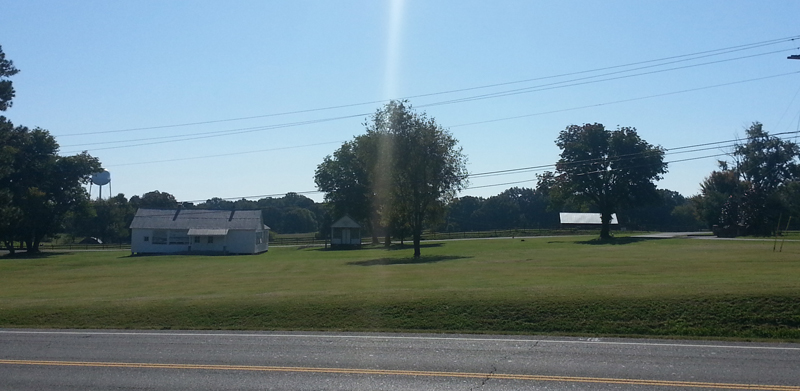
