= Samuel F. Glass House =

Historic house in Tennessee, United States

- U.S. National Register of Historic Places
- Location within Tennessee Location within the United States
- Location: TN 96 at Boyd Mill Pike, Franklin, Tennessee
- Coordinates: 35.93694°N 86.92734°W
- Area: 1.8 acres (0.73 ha)
- Built: 1859 and 1869
- Architectural style: Greek Revival, Italianate, Central hall plan
- MPS: Williamson County MRA
- NRHP reference No.: 88000309
- Added to NRHP: April 13, 1988

The Samuel F. Glass House is a property in Franklin, Tennessee that dates from 1859. It was listed on the National Register of Historic Places in 1988. It has also been known as Pleasant View.

It was the manor house of one of the three largest plantations in Williamson County, prior to the American Civil War, having more than 1,000 acres (400 ha) in area and having many slaves. Other contenders for the largest antebellum plantation are the plantations of Beechwood Hall (the H. G. W. Mayberry House) and of Ravenswood (the James H. Wilson House), which are also NRHP-listed.

It includes Greek Revival, Italianate, Central hall plan and other architecture.

The NRHP eligibility of the property was addressed in a 1988 study of Williamson County historical resources.

The house was part of a larger farm, Pleasant View Farm which also contains an archeological site, a Mississippian culture village site.
