= Wyatt Hall (Franklin, Tennessee) =

Historic house in Tennessee, United States

- U.S. National Register of Historic Places
- Location within Tennessee Location within the United States
- Location: U.S. 31, Franklin, Tennessee
- Coordinates: 35°56′22″N 86°51′23″W
- Area: 8.4 acres (3.4 ha)
- Built: c. 1805 and 1847
- Architectural style: Federal
- NRHP reference No.: 80003882
- Added to NRHP: July 2, 1980

Wyatt Hall is a property in Franklin, Tennessee that was listed on the National Register of Historic Places in 1980. It was built or has other significance in c.1805 and 1847. It includes Federal architecture. When listed the property included one contributing building and two non-contributing buildings on an area of 8.4 acres (3.4 ha).

The building is one of the oldest houses in Middle Tennessee, and its walls were plastered with a mix of hogs' hair, lime, and sand. A smokehouse and a storage shed stand on the property, both "original" log structures.
