= Leipers Fork Historic District =

Historic district in Tennessee, United States

- U.S. National Register of Historic Places
- U.S. Historic district
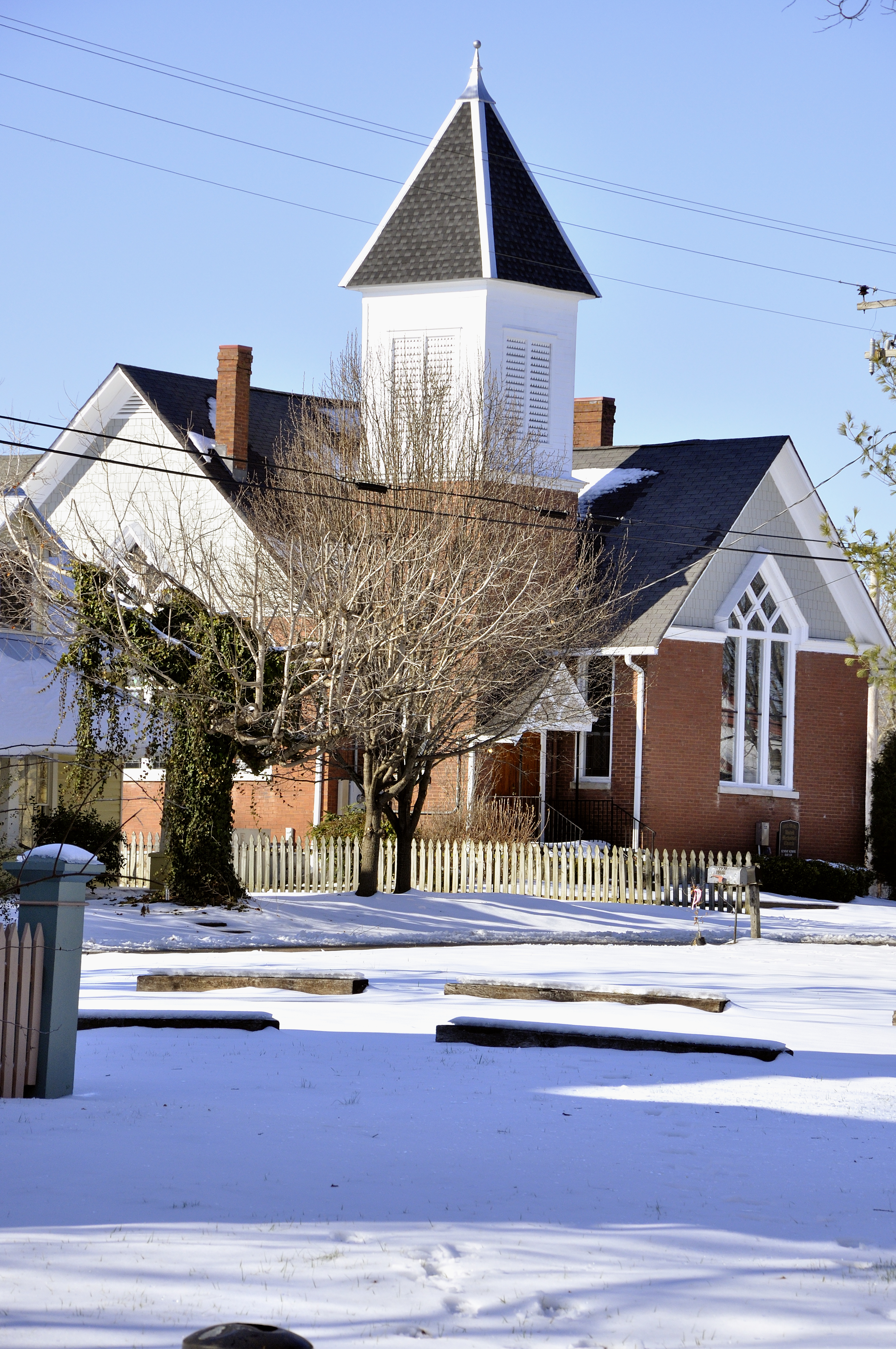

- Location within Tennessee Location within the United States
- Location: Roughly bounded by Joseph St., Old TN 96, Old Hillsboro Rd., and Sycamore St., Leipers Fork, Tennessee
- Coordinates: 35°53′46″N 86°59′57″W
- Area: 18 acres (7.3 ha)
- Architectural style: Queen Anne and Bungalow/Craftsman
- MPS: Williamson County MRA
- NRHP reference No.: 98000818
- Added to NRHP: July 1, 1998

Leipers Fork Historic District is a 18-acre (7.3 ha) historic district in Leipers Fork, Tennessee that was listed on the National Register of Historic Places in 1998. The area has also been known as Benton Town and as Hillsboro.

It includes Queen Anne and Bungalow/Craftsman architecture.

When listed, the district included 54 contributing buildings and 21 non-contributing buildings. The eligibility of the property for NRHP listing was addressed in a 1988 study of Williamson County historical resources.
