= George Pollard House =

Historic house in Tennessee, United States

- U.S. National Register of Historic Places
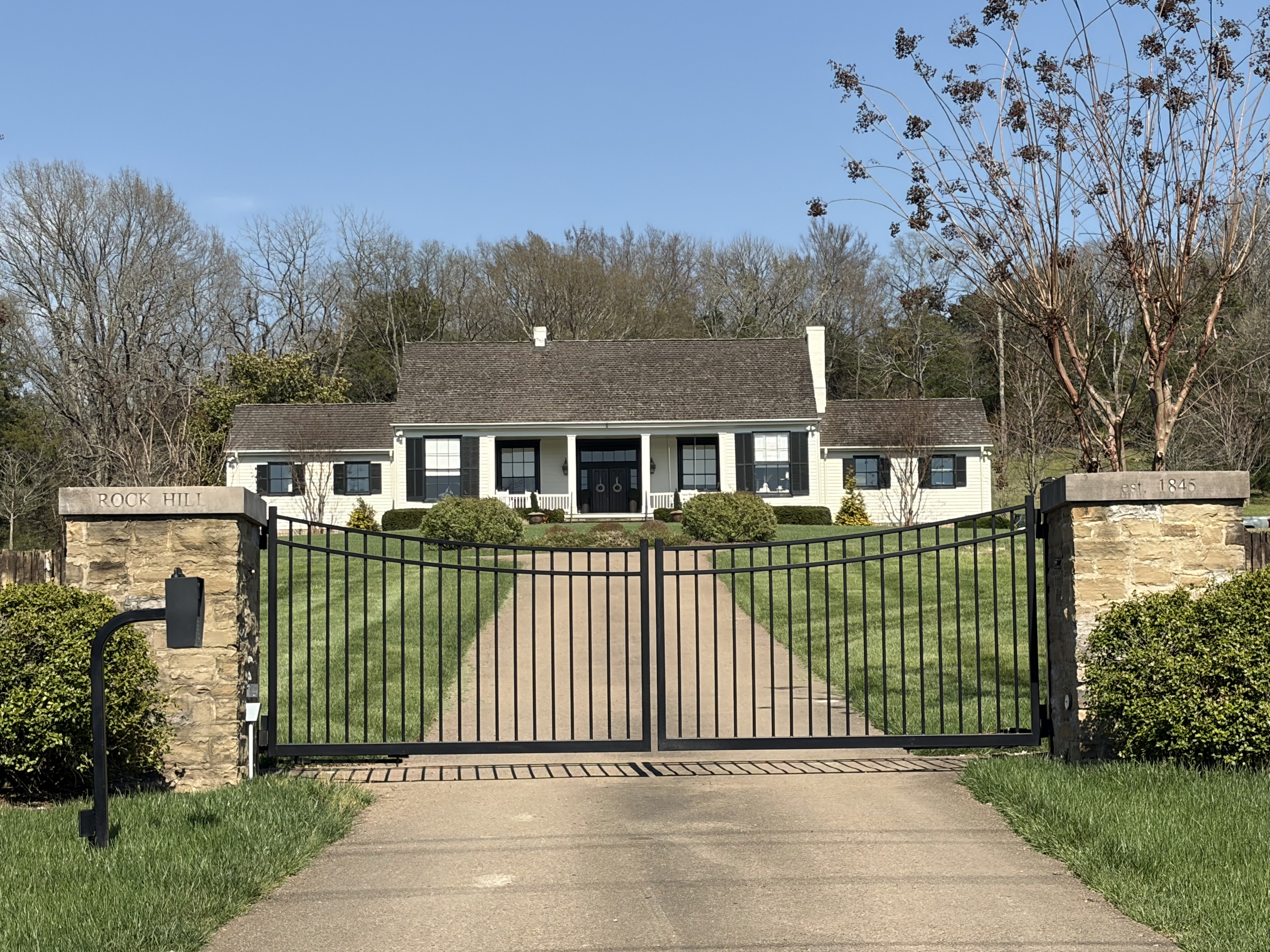
- The Pollard House in 2026

- Location within Tennessee Location within the United States
- Location: Wilson Pike 1 2/10 mi. S of Peytonsville Rd., Franklin, Tennessee
- Coordinates: 35°53′36″N 86°43′46″W
- Area: 3 acres (1.2 ha)
- Built: c. 1845
- Architectural style: Greek Revival, Central passage plan
- MPS: Williamson County MRA
- NRHP reference No.: 88000336
- Added to NRHP: April 13, 1988

George Pollard House is a property in Franklin, Tennessee, United States, that was listed on the National Register of Historic Places in 1988. It was built or has other significance as of c.1845. It includes Central passage plan and other architecture. When listed the property included one contributing building and one non-contributing structure on an area of 3 acres (1.2 ha).

The property was covered in a 1988 study of Williamson County historical resources.
