= Newton Cannon House =

Historic house in Tennessee, United States

- Formerly listed on the U.S. National Register of Historic Places
- Location within Tennessee Location within the United States
- Location: Taliaferro Rd., College Grove, Tennessee
- Coordinates: 35.8165°N 86.6502°W
- Area: 9 acres (3.6 ha)
- Built: c. 1800 and c. 1820
- NRHP reference No.: 84003741
- Removed from NRHP: February 9, 1987

The Newton Cannon House is a property in College Grove, Tennessee, that was the home of Newton Cannon, a U.S. Congressman and Governor of Tennessee. The earliest section of the building was built circa 1800 as a log structure. The house was listed on the National Register of Historic Places. After the house was burned in an arson fire on January 27, 1987, it was removed from the National Register.
