= Bank of Nolensville =

- U.S. National Register of Historic Places
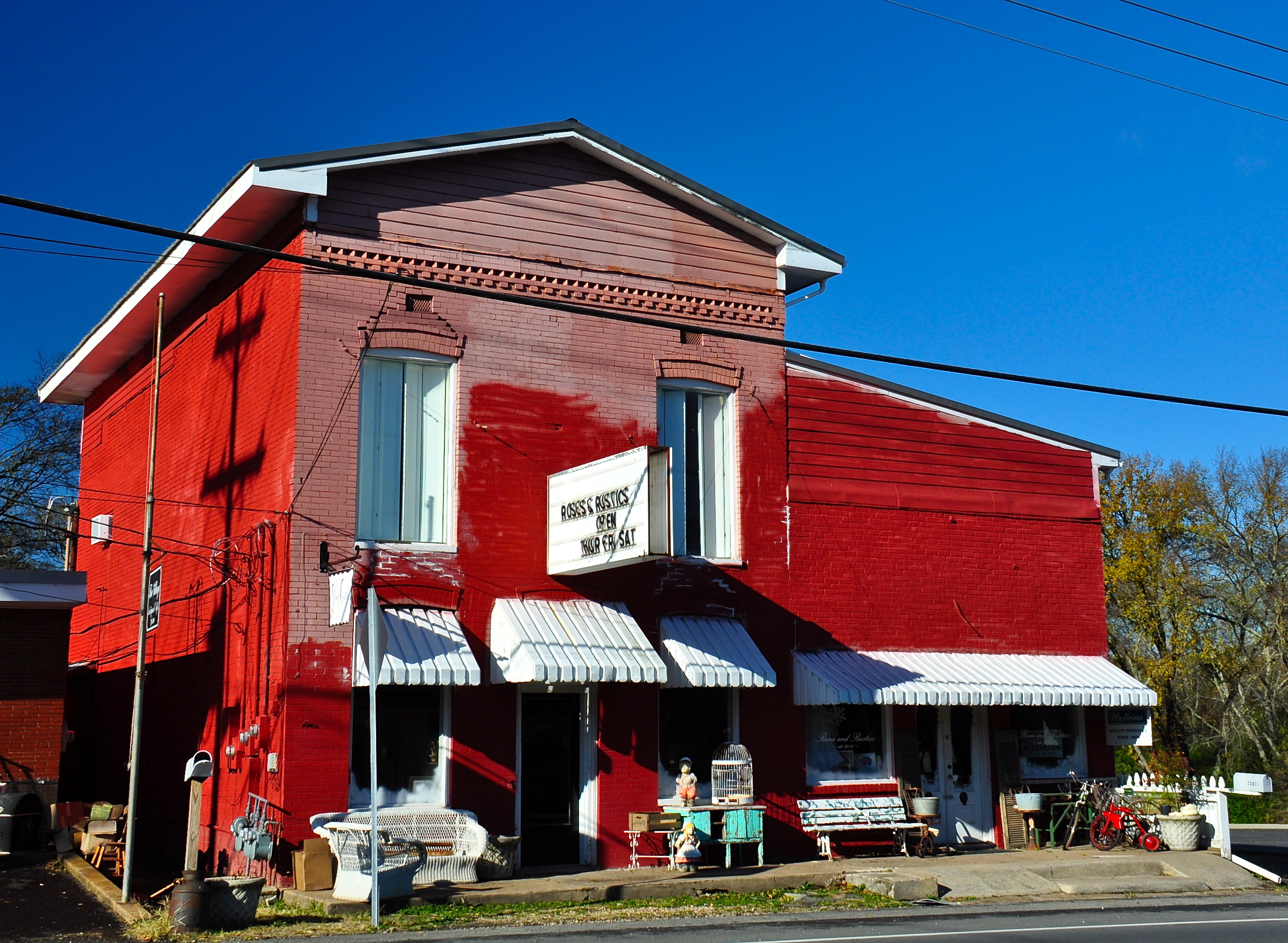
- Bank of Nolensvile in November 2013

- Location within Tennessee Location within the United States
- Location: US Alt. 41, Nolensville, Tennessee
- Coordinates: 35°57′11″N 86°40′12″W
- Area: less than 1 acre (0.40 ha)
- Built: 1906
- MPS: Williamson County MRA
- NRHP reference No.: 88000287
- Added to NRHP: April 13, 1988

The Bank of Nolensville is a two-story brick building in Nolensville, Tennessee, United States, that was listed on the National Register of Historic Places in 1988. The bank that it once housed was opened in 1906 and operated until October 1932, when it was forced to close during the Great Depression.

Sherwood G. Jenkins (1843–1915) was a promoter of the Bank of Nolensville and was president at his death in 1915.
