= Ravenswood (Brentwood, Tennessee) =

Historic house in Tennessee, United States

- U.S. National Register of Historic Places
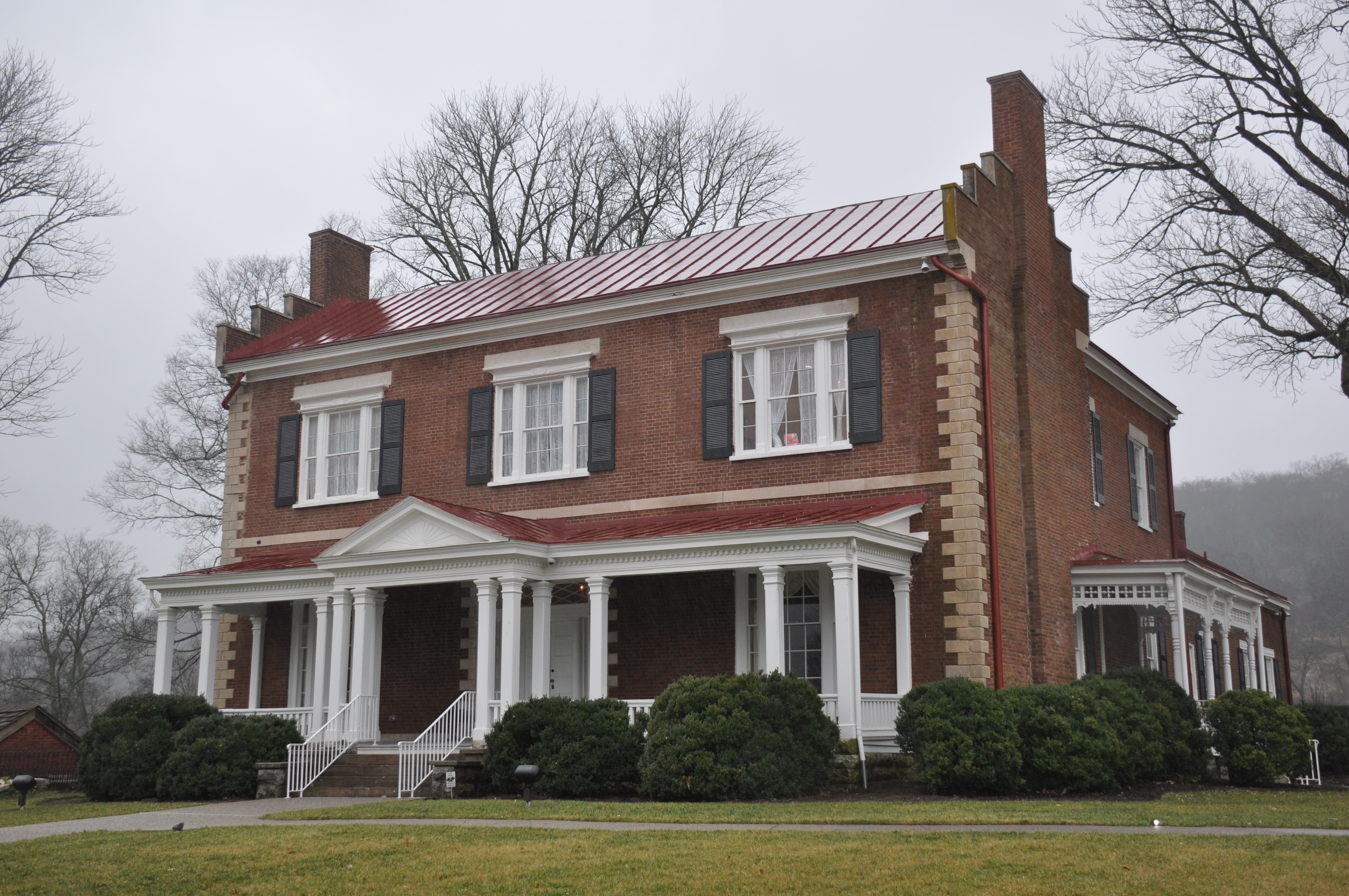
- Ravenswood, January 2015.

- Location within Tennessee Location within the United States
- Location: Wilson Pike, Brentwood, Tennessee 35°56′45″N 86°46′13″W
- Coordinates: 35°56′45″N 86°46′13″W
- Area: 52 acres (21 ha)
- Built: 1825
- Architectural style: Greek Revival and Federal
- NRHP reference No.: 83003073
- Added to NRHP: July 7, 1983

Ravenswood is a historic property in Brentwood, Tennessee. Ravenswood was built by James Hazard Wilson II between 1821 and 1825. It was named to honor Sam Houston, the best man at Wilson's wedding. Houston was known as "the Raven" to the Cherokee. Ravenswood was listed on the National Register of Historic Places in 1983. In 2010, the city of Brentwood acquired the surrounding acreage and created Marcelle Vivrette Smith Park, which in 2014 became the largest park in Brentwood. After creating the park, the city restored the grounds and opened Ravenswood mansion for tours and special events.

The plantation was one of several homes owned by the Wilson family. It comprised more than 1,000 acres and was one of the largest in Williamson County prior to the Civil War. Records from the 1860 census show that there were 55 enslaved people at Ravenswood. The plantation contained as many as 13 cabins for enslaved people, and the Wilson family also had enslaved people at their plantations in Louisiana and Mississippi. At the outbreak of the Civil War, Wilson hosted one of the area's two Confederate training camps at his Midway Plantation, which today is the Brentwood County Club.

In 2010, the city of Brentwood purchased Ravenswood and the surrounding 325 acres, agreeing to name the resulting park as Marcella Vivrette Smith Park. In 2013, the city purchased an additional 80 acres to add to the park. It is now the largest park in Brentwood.

The property includes Greek Revival and Federal architecture. When listed on the NRHP, the property included five contributing buildings and three non-contributing buildings on an area of 52 acres (21 ha).

== See also ==
- Beechwood Hall (the H. G. W. Mayberry House)
- Pleasant View (the Samuel F. Glass House)
