= Constantine Sneed House =

Historic house in Tennessee, United States

- U.S. National Register of Historic Places
- Location within Tennessee Location within the United States
- Location: 9135 Old Smyrna Rd., Brentwood, Tennessee
- Coordinates: 36°00′57″N 86°46′16″W
- Area: 9.6 acres (3.9 ha)
- Built: c.1825, c.1850 and c.1910
- Architectural style: Double cell
- MPS: Williamson County MRA
- NRHP reference No.: 88000354
- Added to NRHP: April 13, 1988

The Constantine Sneed House, also known as Windy Hill, is a historic mansion in Brentwood, Tennessee. It was one of four houses built by the Sneed family on the Old Smyrna Road.

== History ==
The mansion was built circa 1825. It was built by Constantine Sneed (1790-1864), the son of James Sneed and the great-great-great-great uncle of Carly Fiorina, a veteran of the American Revolutionary War who received a land grant of 640 acres in Williamson County in 1798. One of Constantine Sneed's brothers was Reverend Joseph P. Sneed.

It is a two-story brick house, upon a fancy dressed limestone foundation, with brick on the front facade laid in Flemish bond and other facades having five course common bond.

== Architectural significance ==
It has been listed on the National Register of Historic Places since 1988. When listed the property included the main, brick two-story house, which was the listing's one contributing building. It also included one contributing structure, one non-contributing building, and one non-contributing structure, on an area of 8.2 acres (3.3 ha).
