= Cedarmont (Williamson County, Tennessee) =

Historic house in Tennessee, United States

- U.S. National Register of Historic Places
- Location within Tennessee Location within the United States
- Location: Off TN 96, Franklin, Tennessee
- Coordinates: 35°53′24″N 86°48′5″W
- Area: 1.5 acres (0.61 ha)
- Built: c. 1816 and c. 1855
- Architectural style: Greek Revival
- NRHP reference No.: 84003747
- Added to NRHP: July 12, 1984

Cedarmont is a two-story brick house in Williamson County, Tennessee, near Franklin, that was listed on the National Register of Historic Places in 1984.

It was deemed "a fine example of Middle Tennessee's early brick vernacular farmhouse with added Greek Revival detailing." The main portion of the house was built c.1816 and a two-story "T-plan" addition was added in c.1855.

It includes Greek Revival architecture. When listed the property included two contributing buildings (one of them a smokehouse) and a contributing site, on an area of 1.5 acres (0.61 ha).
