= Triune, Tennessee =

Triune
- Unincorporated community
- Location within Tennessee Location within the United States
- Coordinates: 35°51′15″N 86°39′32″W
- Country: United States
- State: Tennessee
- Counties: Williamson
- Elevation: 837 ft (255 m)
- Time zone: UTC-6 (CST)
  - Summer (DST): UTC-5 (CDT)

Triune is an unincorporated community in eastern Williamson County, Tennessee, approximately halfway between Franklin and Murfreesboro. The community is located along the Wilson Branch of the Harpeth River. The intersection of former local roads State Route 96 (Murfreesboro Road) and the concurrency of U.S. Routes 31A and 41A (Nolensville Road) is here. The community is located just north of these roads interchange with Interstate 840.

== History ==
The earliest recorded non-Native American settlement in the Triune area was by William Jordan, a Virginian who built a log cabin there in 1796. By the early 1800s, a community had developed, called Hardeman's Crossroads after an early landowner. Settlers continued to arrive from Virginia and Kentucky, sometimes bringing slaves with them.

By the 1820s the community consisted of a number of substantial buildings, including a general store, saloons, and a leather shop. Local cotton plantations even had their own mills and cotton gins. The planters had brought in numerous enslaved African Americans. The Hardeman Academy was opened in 1828 as a private boys school, and the Hardeman's Crossroads post office had opened by 1830. The community's name was then changed to Flemingsburg.

The Triune Methodist Church, built in 1849, was the first church structure in the community, and in time the community adopted Triune as its permanent name. Five schools for white children were built between 1820 and 1845.

During the Civil War, Triune was the site of several military engagements. A number of Confederate brigades under General Braxton Bragg defended Middle Tennessee, and in December 1862 the area saw military activity related to the Battle of Stones River at Murfreesboro. Essentially a drawn battle, the Confederates nevertheless retreated and the Union Army occupied Triune, erecting fortifications to control the crossroads. Between April and June 1863, several cavalry skirmishes were fought in Triune, including one in June in which Confederate forces led under Nathan Bedford Forrest broke through the Union lines. The Methodist and Baptist churches, several homes, and the Porter Female Academy were burned by Union troops in 1863.

The community slowly rebuilt after the war, though by the 1880s Triune still had only 57 white residents. On May 2, 1892, African Americans in the area reportedly killed at least three white residents in retaliation for the lynching of Ephraim Grizzard in Nashville. Grizzard had been taken from jail and a mob estimated at over 10,000 gathered to see him hanged from a city bridge. Nashville is 30 miles north of Triune and those killed by the African Americans had no known connection to the Nashville lynching.

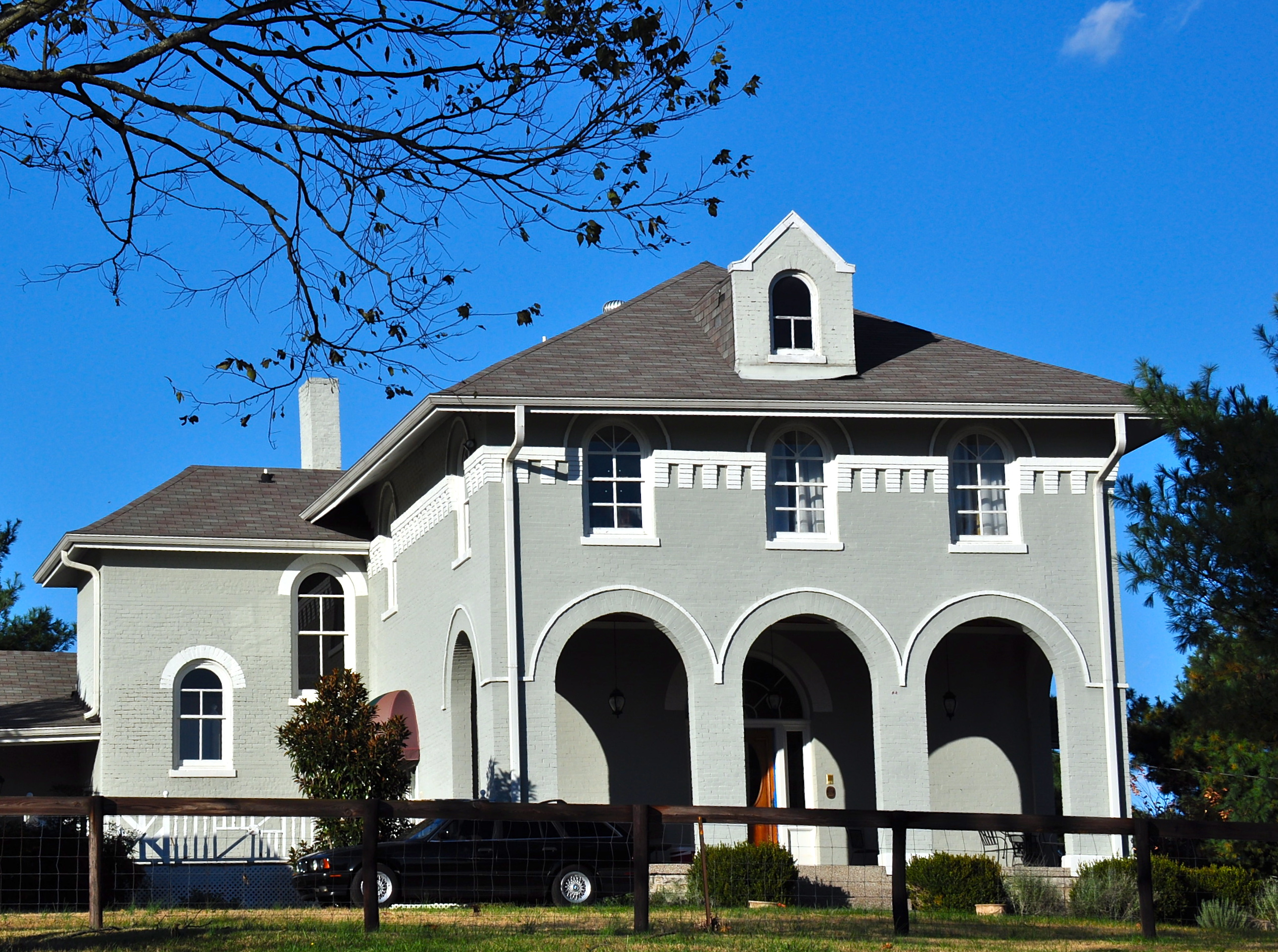
Bostick Female Academy in November 2013

Dr. Jonathan Bostick, a Mississippi planter, had been a trustee of Porter Female Academy and knew it was destroyed in the war. Before his death in 1868, he made a bequest in his will to establish a "suitable site and buildings" for a new "female academy" in Tennessee. Because his descendants contested the will, there was a long delay in implementing the bequest. Litigation reached the U.S. Supreme Court, which upheld his bequest. Some 11 acres (4.5 ha) of land in Triune were purchased for the development of what was called the Bostick Female Academy. It was built in 1892 and began operation in 1893. The Bostick Female Academy operated until about 1900 as a girls' boarding and day school for whites, enrolling as many as 75 girls.

After the state started to fund public education, parents no longer supported private schooling. The Hardeman Academy, built in 1828 as a boys' school, was converted to a public school. After it was destroyed by fire in 1904, the Bostick Female Academy building was used as the community public school. It served this role until the mid-20th century; since then it has been purchased and used as a private residence.

Modern Triune is the site of a manufacturing facility that produces equipment for harvesting tobacco, still a commodity crop in Middle Tennessee.

== Landmark buildings ==
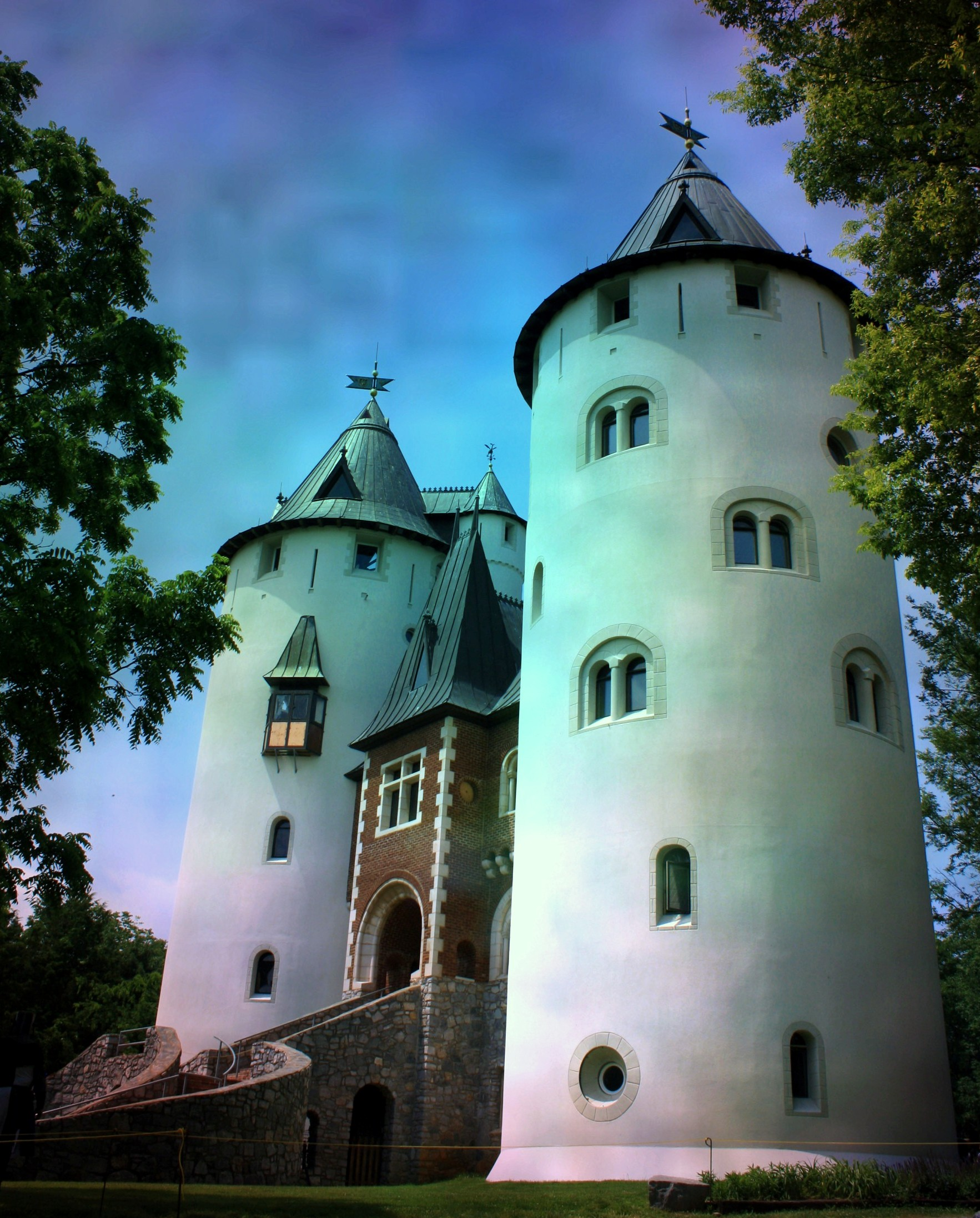
Castle Gwynn 2012

- The Bostick Female Academy building is now used as a private residence; it was listed on the National Register of Historic Places in 1982.
- Triune Methodist Church, built in 1874 on the foundation of the church's first building, is another 19th-century landmark building in town.
- Several homes built in the early 19th century were also still standing as of 1988.
- A more recent local landmark is Castle Gwynn, built as a replica of a 12th-century Welsh border castle. It was built as a private residence beginning in 1980. In the early 21st century, it serves as the location of the Tennessee Renaissance Festival, a Renaissance fair held annually in May.

== Gallery ==
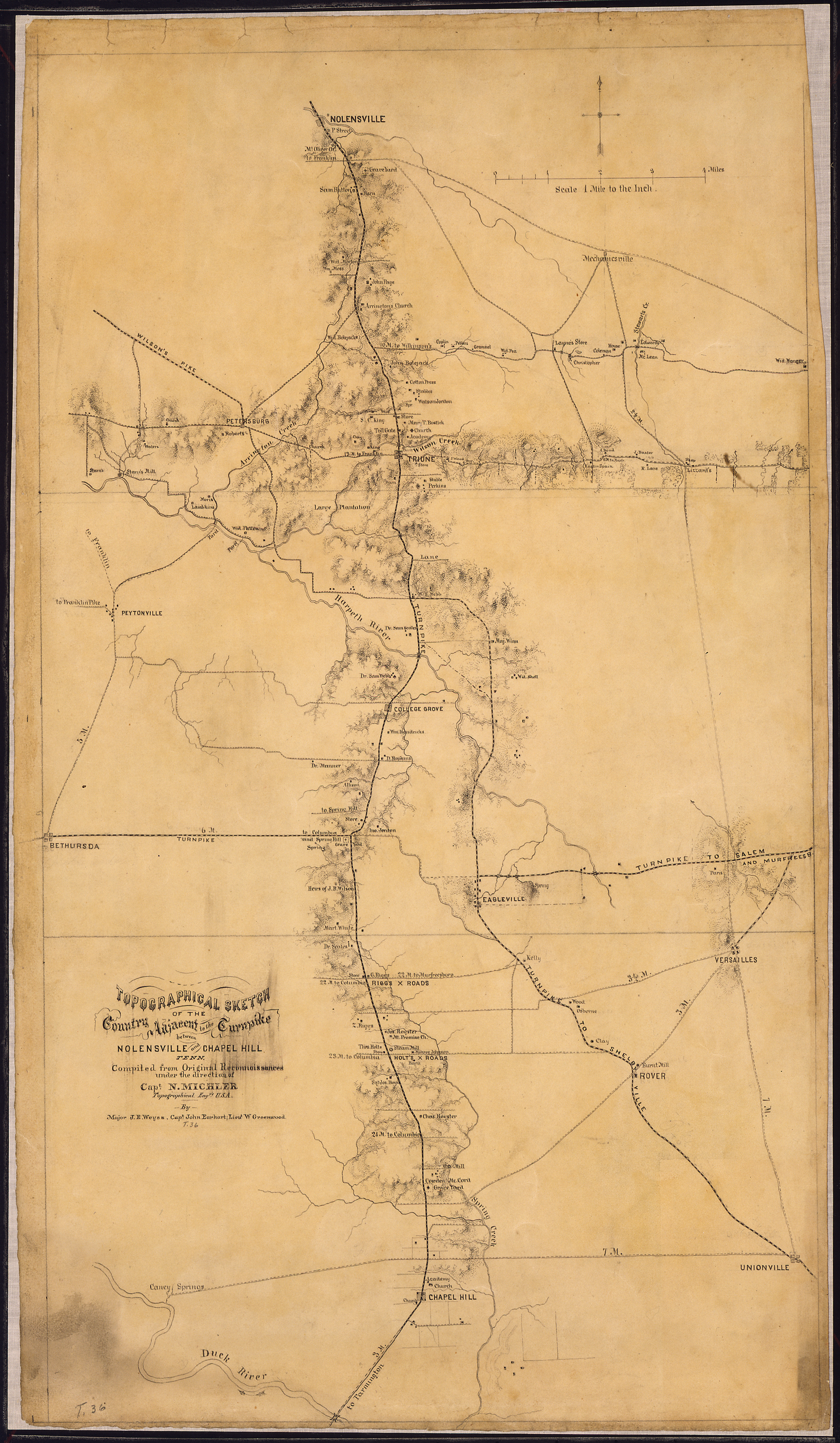
Topographical sketch with Triune and vicinity circa 1861-1865.
