= King House =

King House may refer to:

== In the Republic of Ireland ==
- King House (Boyle, Ireland), Boyle, County Roscommon

== In the United States ==
(by state, then town)

- King House (Montevallo, Alabama)
- David L. King House, Hardy, Arkansas
- Hugh L. King House, Heber Springs, Arkansas
- King-Neimeyer-Mathis House, Hot Springs, Arkansas
- Dr. Alexander T. King House and Carriage House, Pueblo, Colorado, listed on the NRHP in Pueblo County
- George King House, Sharon, Connecticut
- Alexander King House, Suffield, Connecticut
- Dr. Willard Van Orsdel King House, Fort Lauderdale, Florida
- John A. King House, Lake Butler, Florida
- King House (Mayport, Florida)
- King-Hooton House, Pensacola, Florida
- Tandy King House, Fayetteville, Georgia
- King-Knowles-Gheesling House, Greensboro, Georgia, listed on the NRHP in Greene County
- Patrick J. King House, Chicago, Illinois
- King-Dennis Farm, Centerville, Indiana
- M. J. King House, Shelbyville, Kentucky, listed on the NRHP in Shelby County
- Gov. William King House, Bath, Maine
- King House (Newton, Massachusetts)
- King–McBride Mansion, Virginia City, Nevada, also known as King House
- King Store and Homestead, Ledgewood, New Jersey
- King's Carriage House, New York, New York
- King Manor, New York, New York
- Polaski King House, Syracuse, New York
- Dr. Franklin King House-Idlewild, Eden, North Carolina
- King-Waldrop House, Hendersonville, North Carolina
- King-Casper-Ward-Bazemore House, Ahoskie, North Carolina
- King-Freeman-Speight House, Republican, North Carolina
- King-Flowers-Keaton House, Statesville, North Carolina
- King House (Windsor, North Carolina)
- William King House (Canal Winchester, Ohio), listed on the National Register of Historic Places in Franklin County
- Dr. King House, Fredericktown, Ohio, listed on the NRHP in Knox County
- George W. King Mansion-Etowah, Marion, Ohio, listed on the NRHP in Marion County
- King-Phillips-Deibel House, Medina, Ohio, listed on the NRHP in Medina County
- Charles King House, Philomath, Oregon
- Isaac King House and Barn, Philomath, Oregon
- Samuel W. King House, Portland, Oregon
- Edward King House, Newport, Rhode Island
- Edward Washington King House, Bristol, Tennessee, listed on the NRHP in Sullivan County
- King Homestead, Cottontown, Tennessee
- Edward Moody King House, Dyersburg, Tennessee
- William King House (Franklin, Tennessee)
- King Ranch, Nueces County, Texas
- Richard King House, Corpus Christi, Texas, listed on the NRHP in Nueces County
- Mrs. J. C. King House, McKinney, Texas, listed on the NRHP in Collin County
- King–Lancaster–McCoy–Mitchell House, Bristol, Virginia
- King–Runkle House, Charlottesville, Virginia
- F.S. King Brothers Ranch Historic District, Laramie, Wyoming

== See also ==
- King's House (disambiguation)
- William King House (disambiguation)
