= Dr. Hezekiah Oden House =

Historic house in Tennessee, United States

- U.S. National Register of Historic Places
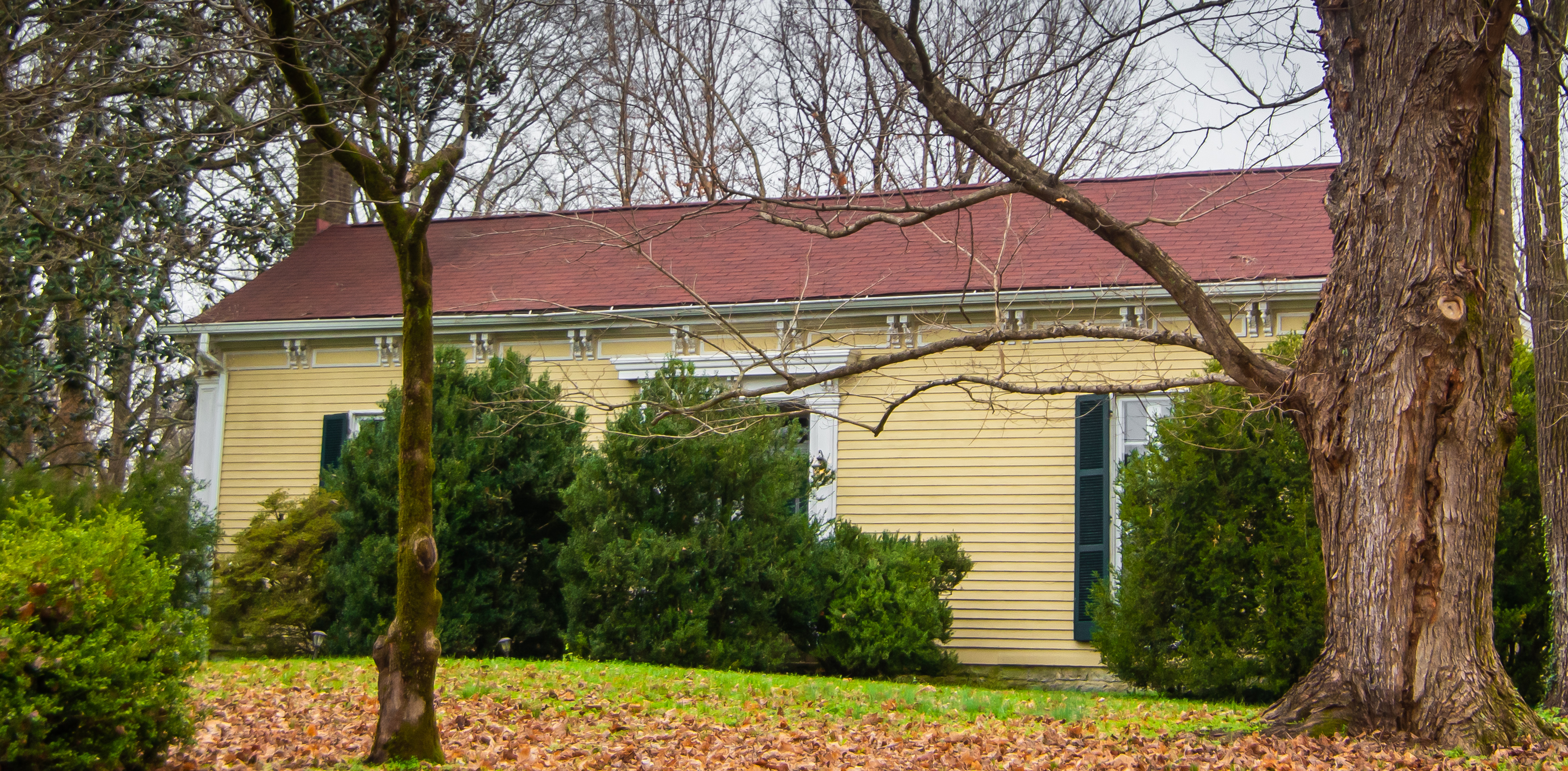

- Location within Tennessee Location within the United States
- Location: 1312 TN-106., Franklin, Tennessee
- Coordinates: 35°51′57″N 86°50′47″W
- Area: 1 acre (0.40 ha)
- Built: c. 1850
- Architectural style: Greek Revival, Central passage plan
- MPS: Williamson County MRA
- NRHP reference No.: 88000322
- Added to NRHP: April 13, 1988

The Dr. Hezekiah Oden House is a building and property in Franklin, Tennessee, United States, dating from c. 1850 that was listed on the National Register of Historic Places (NRHP) in 1988. It has also been known as Walnut Winds. It includes Greek Revival, Central passage plan and other architecture. The NRHP listing included one contributing building, one contributing site and two non-contributing buildings on an area of 1 acre (0.40 ha).

It was one of about thirty antebellum "significant brick and frame residences" built in Williamson County that have survived and that were centers of slave plantations. It is one of several of these located "on the rich farmland surrounding Franklin"; others were Glen Echo, the Franklin Hardeman House and the Samuel Glass House, the Thomas Brown House, the Stokely Davis House, the Beverly Toon House and the Samuel S. Marten House.
