= Glen Echo (Franklin, Tennessee) =

Historic house in Tennessee, United States

- U.S. National Register of Historic Places
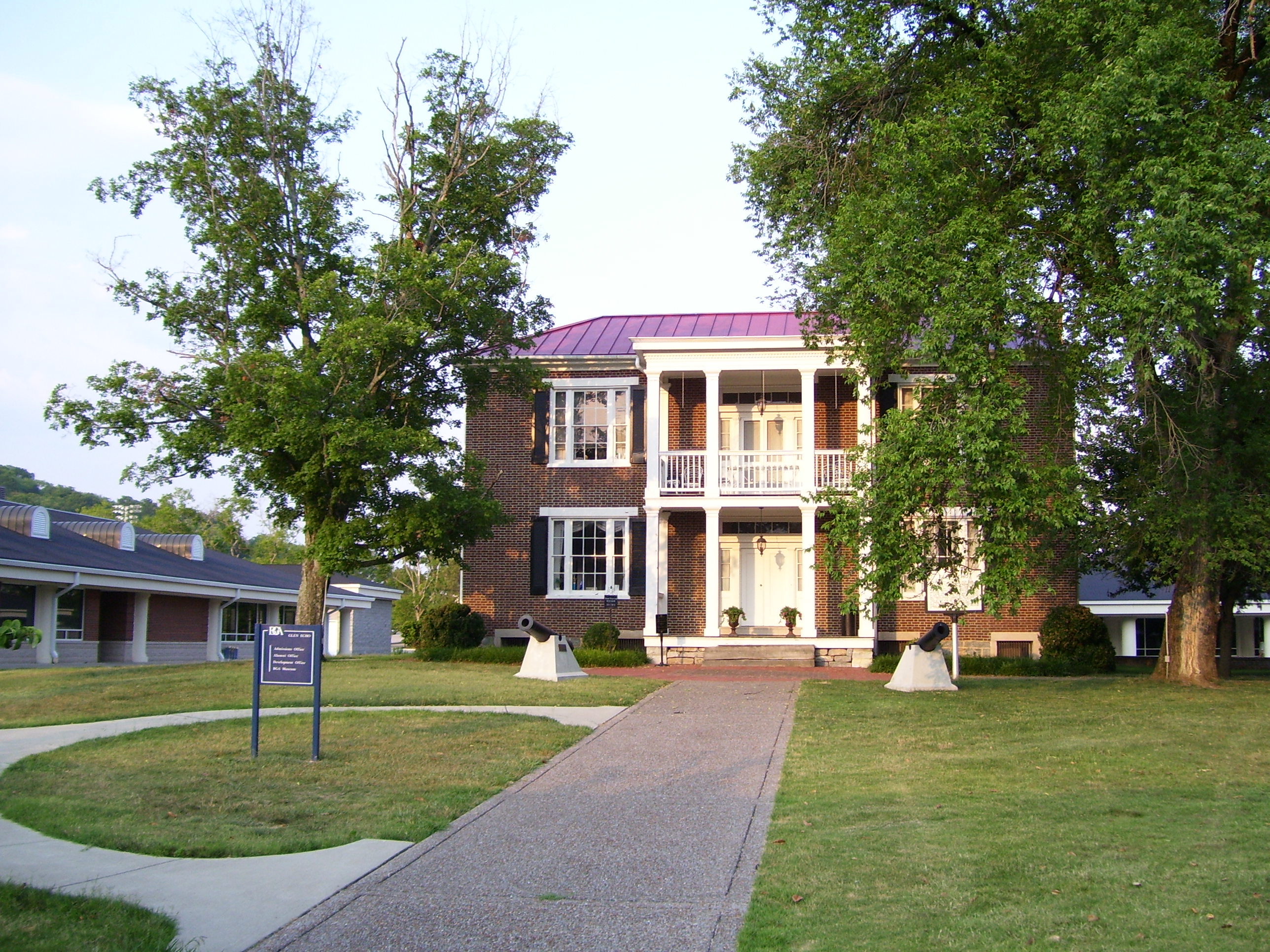

- Location within Tennessee Location within the United States
- Location: N of Franklin off U.S. 31 on Spencer Creek Rd., Franklin, Tennessee
- Coordinates: 35°57′0″N 86°51′29″W
- Area: 14 acres (5.7 ha)
- Built: c.1828
- Architect: Ruff, Joseph
- Architectural style: Federal
- NRHP reference No.: 76001808
- Added to NRHP: November 7, 1976

Glen Echo, also known as Harpeth Hall, is a property in Franklin, Tennessee that was listed on the National Register of Historic Places in 1976. It is a former plantation house that is now the centerpiece and administrative office of the Battle Ground Academy campus.

It was designed and/or built c. 1828 by Joseph Ruff. The structure includes Federal architecture. The NRHP listing was for an area of 14 acres (5.7 ha) with just one contributing building.

It was one of about thirty surviving antebellum "significant brick and frame residences" built in Williamson County that were centers of slave plantations. It is one of several of these located "on the rich farmland surrounding Franklin"; others were the Dr. Hezekiah Oden House, the Franklin Hardeman House and the Samuel Glass House, the Thomas Brown House, the Stokely Davis House, the Beverly Toon House and the Samuel S. Marten House.
