= William King House =

William King House may refer to:

- William King House (Canal Winchester, Ohio), listed on the National Register of Historic Places listings in Franklin County, Ohio
- William King House (Franklin, Tennessee), listed on the NRHP in Williamson County

== See also ==
- King House (disambiguation)
