= Old Town Bridge (Franklin, Tennessee) =

- U.S. National Register of Historic Places
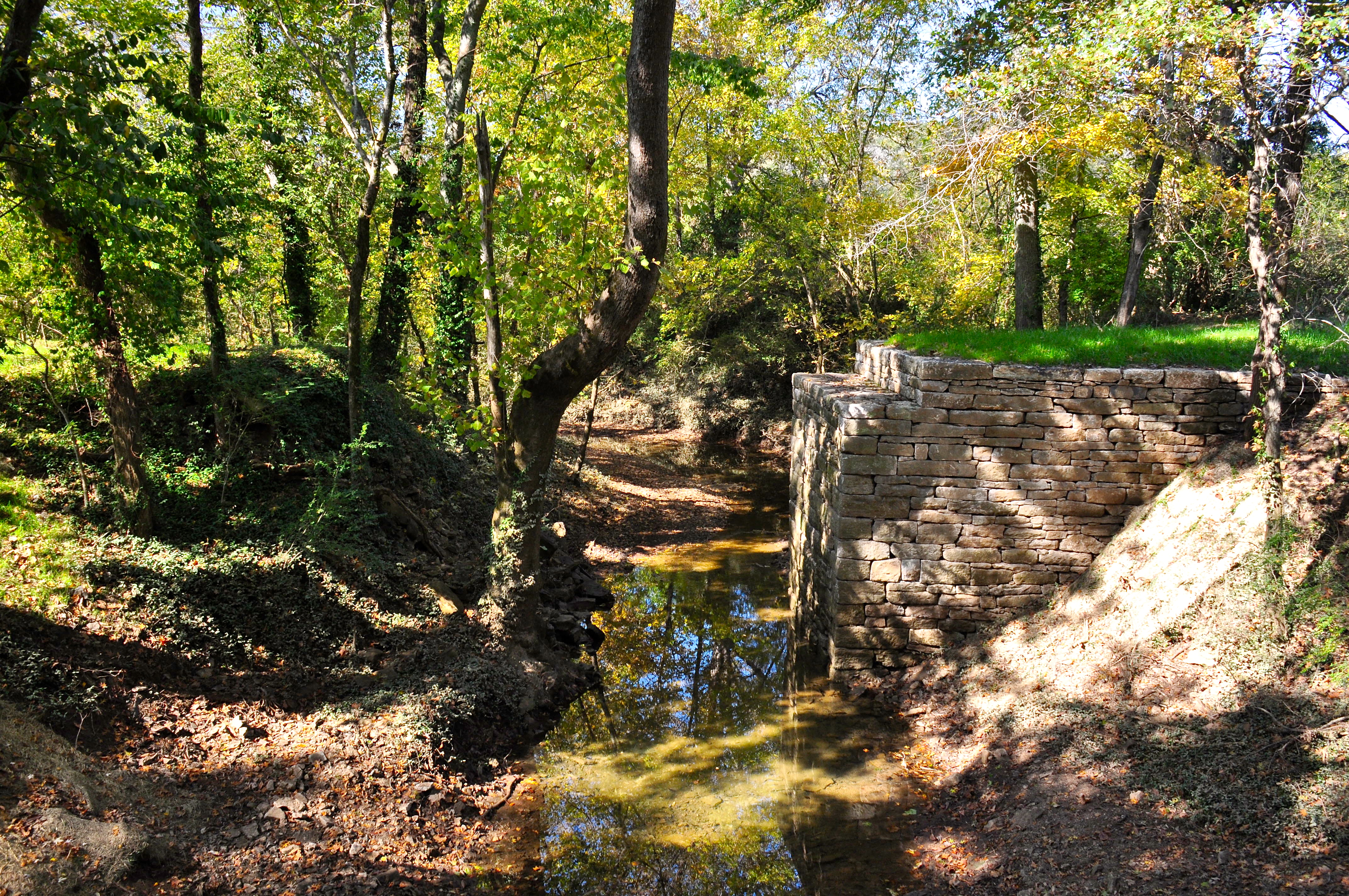
- The remains of Old Town Bridge, October 2014.

- Location within Tennessee Location within the United States
- Nearest city: Franklin, Tennessee
- Coordinates: 35°59′45″N 86°56′10″W
- Area: 1.4 acres (0.57 ha)
- Built: 1801
- Architect: US Army
- MPS: Williamson County MRA (WM-47)
- NRHP reference No.: 88000325
- Added to NRHP: April 13, 1988

The Old Town Bridge in Franklin, Tennessee was a "frame bridge across Brown Creek near its junction with the Big Harpeth River." It was built by U.S. soldiers in 1801. It carried the Harpeth River branch of the Natchez Trace over Brown's Creek. The bridge was rebuilt several times subsequently, but was dismantled some time before 1988. Only the limestone abutments remained when the site was surveyed in 1988.

The bridge is "one of the oldest remaining man-made bridges in Tennessee". A photograph of the bridge is available which shows the "structure consisted of massive masonry abutments with a short pole bridge suspended between them. Pole bridges were probably the most common type of bridge erected in frontier days and are still used today for simple county bridges. These bridges consist merely of poles (trees or logs) extending from one abutment to another with a deck of saplings or planks laid across these poles. Obviously these could be quite primitive with the ground or a natural feature such as a rock shelf serving as the abutments, but they could only be used for short spans. Some pole bridges used log cribs filled with rock and dirt as abutments."

This is considered to be the only site on the Natchez Trace in Williamson County, Tennessee, that retains historic integrity.

It is located about 300 yards from Thomas Brown House, which is also NRHP-listed, and near a plaque to Old Town, an Indian village and mounds site.
