= James Johnston House (Brentwood, Tennessee) =

Historic house in Tennessee, United States

- U.S. National Register of Historic Places
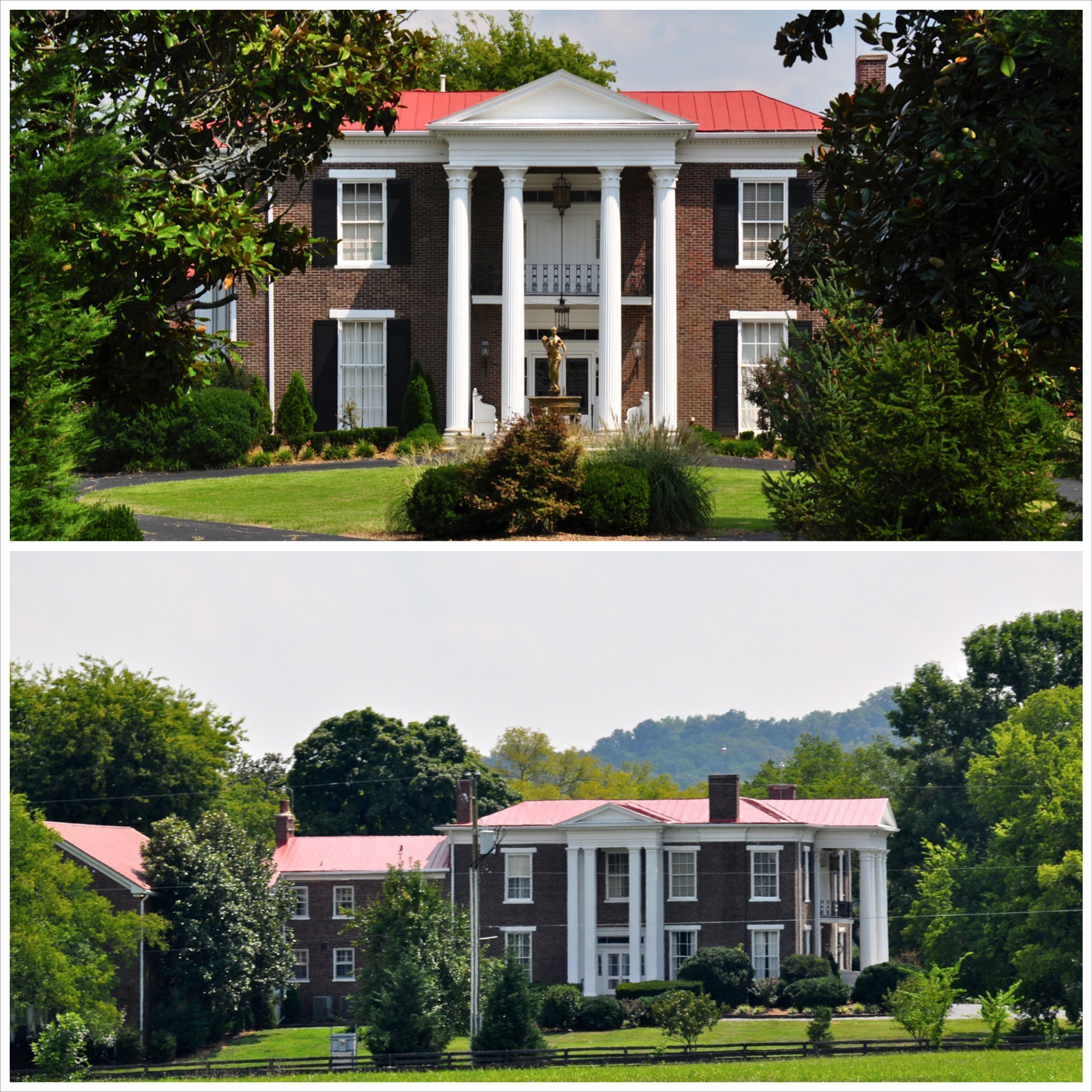
- James Johnston House front and side view, August 2014.

- Location within Tennessee Location within the United States
- Location: S of Brentwood on U.S. 31, Brentwood, Tennessee
- Coordinates: 35°59′47″N 86°48′34″W
- Area: 6 acres (2.4 ha)
- Built: c.1840 and 1864
- Built by: James Johnston
- Architectural style: Greek Revival and Georgian
- NRHP reference No.: 76001807
- Added to NRHP: March 26, 1976

The James Johnston House is a property in Brentwood, Tennessee that dates from c.1840 and that was listed on the National Register of Historic Places in 1976. It has also been known as Isola Bella.

It includes Greek Revival and Georgian architecture.

When listed, the property included three contributing buildings on an area of 6 acres (2.4 ha).

According to a 1988 study of historic resources in Williamson County, the house was one of about thirty surviving "significant brick and frame residences" that had been "the center of large plantations and they display some of the finest construction of the ante-bellum era." It is among houses in the county having "two-story porticos with large square two-story columns with Doric motif capitals."

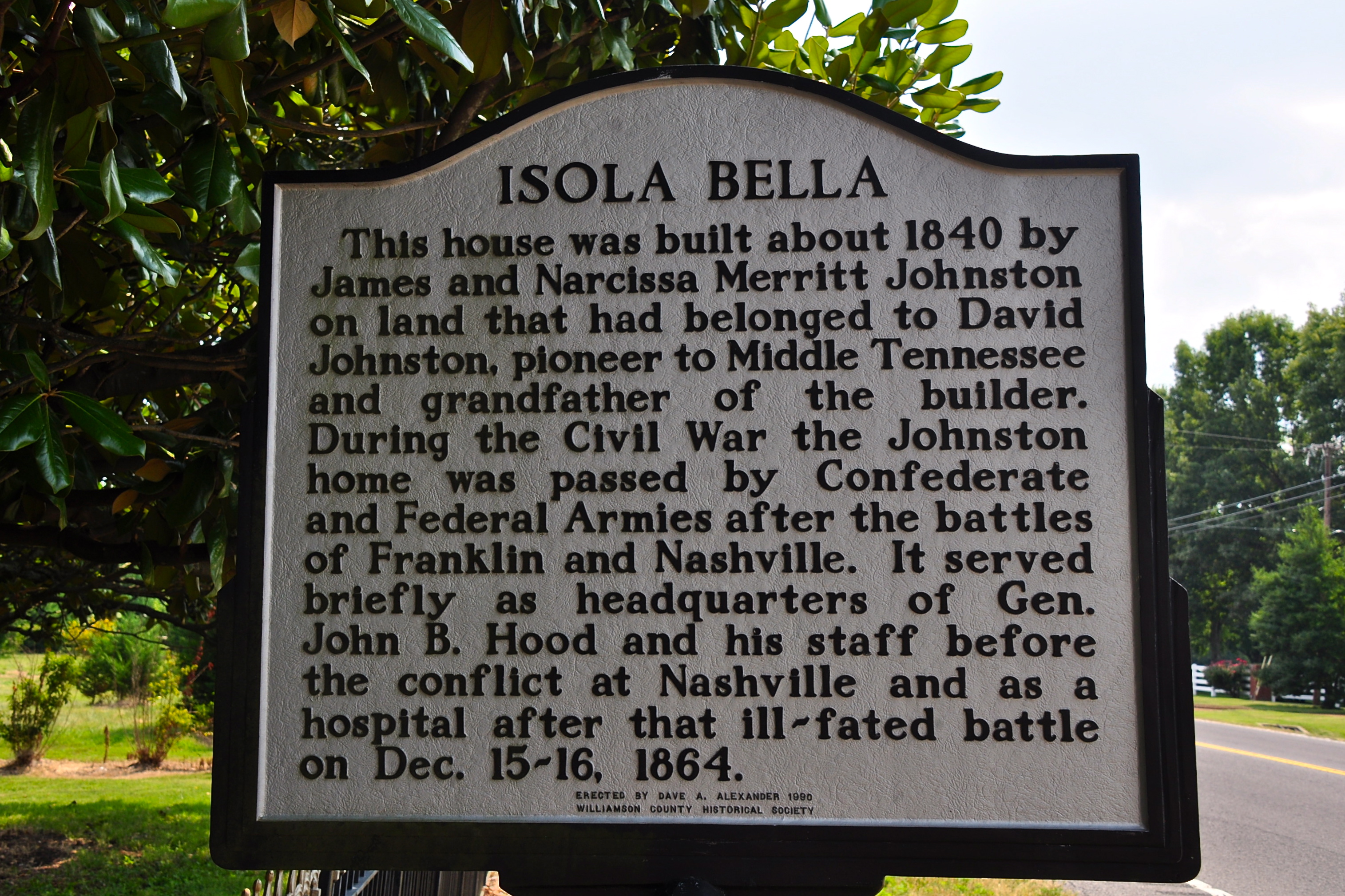
Williamson County Historical Marker for Isola Bella, also known the James Johnston House.

== See also ==
- Mooreland, also on the pike north of Franklin and NRHP-listed
- Mountview, also on the pike north of Franklin and NRHP-listed
- Aspen Grove, also on the pike north of Franklin and a Williamson County historic resource
- Thomas Shute House, also on the pike north of Franklin and a Williamson County historic resource
- Alpheus Truett House, also on the pike north of Franklin and a Williamson County historic resource
