= Claiborne Kinnard House =

Historic house in Tennessee, United States

- U.S. National Register of Historic Places
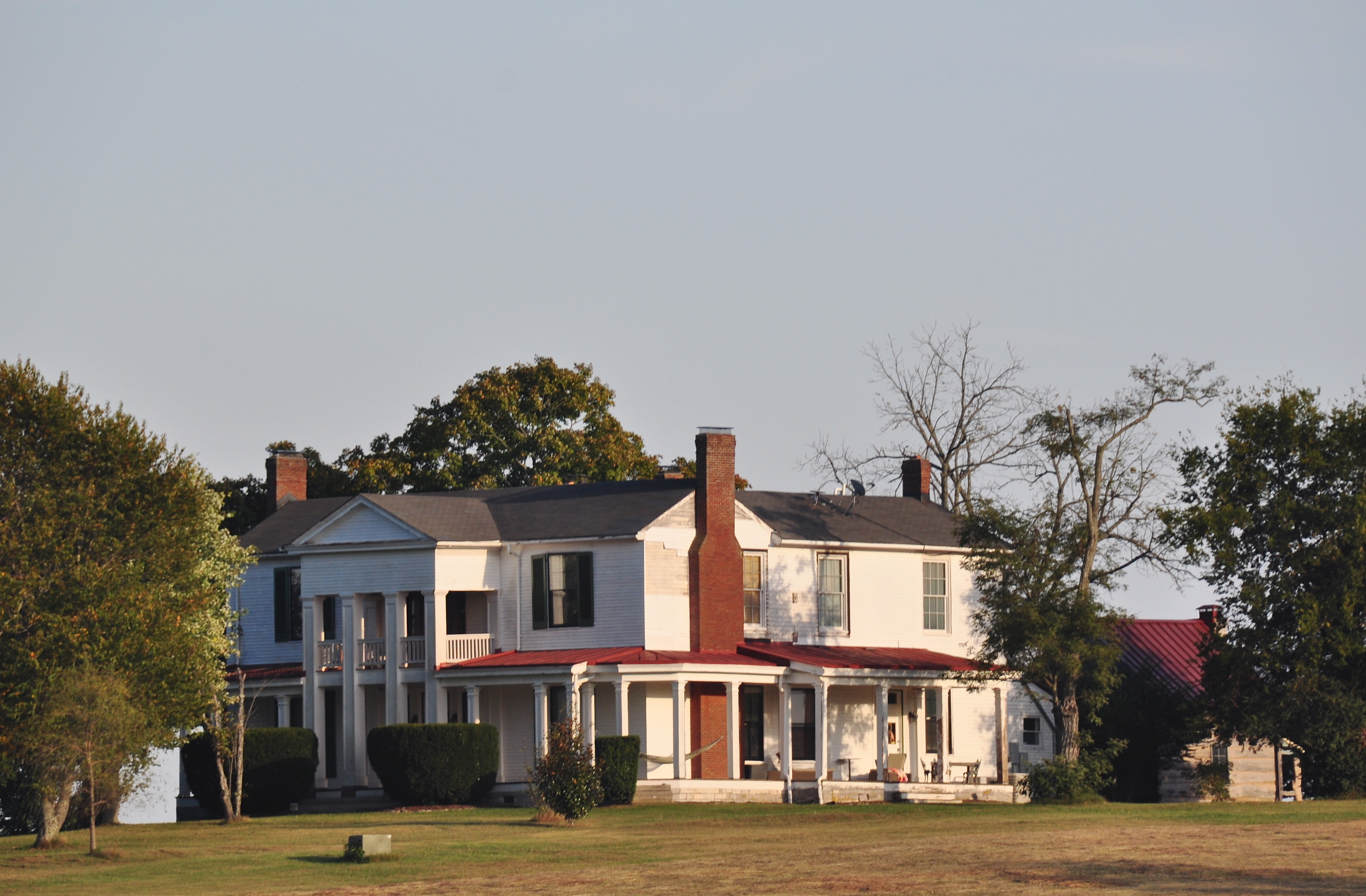
- Clairborne Kinnard House, September 2014.

- Location within Tennessee Location within the United States
- Location: Carters Creek Pike 1/2 mi. N of Bear Creek Rd., Franklin, Tennessee
- Coordinates: 35°52′20″N 86°56′31″W
- Area: 1.4 acres (0.57 ha)
- Built: c. 1887, c. 1890 and c. 1898
- Architectural style: Classical Revival, Central passage plan
- MPS: Williamson County MRA
- NRHP reference No.: 88000355
- Added to NRHP: April 13, 1988

The Claiborne Kinnard House also known as Windermere is a historic home in Franklin, Tennessee, built in 1887 on land that was once the eastern flank of the 1864 Battle of Franklin. A 1988 study of Williamson County historical resources assessed that this house was one of the "best two-story vernacular I-House examples" in the county; the others highly rated were the William King House, the Alpheus Truett House, the Thomas Brown House, the Beverly Toon House, and the Stokely Davis House. The house was listed on the National Register of Historic Places in 1988. It is located in Franklin at the corner of Lewisburg Pike and Carnton Lane (now the Heath Place subdivision).

The land was originally owned by John McGavock who lived at nearby Carnton Plantation. He willed 100 acres (40 ha) to his daughter Harriet (Hattie) and her husband, George L. Cowan who built the house in 1887. It had various unofficial names in the 20th century but the earliest was "Windermere" which is the name preferred by the 21st century owners. In 1915 the house and 215 acres (87 ha) was sold to Claiborne H. Kinnard. When Kinnard died in 1966, the property went to his son Claiborne H. Kinnard Jr. The Kinnard family built a large swimming pool on the property, a business venture known as "Willow Plunge" which was very popular and remained in business from 1924 to 1967.

== See also ==
- Claiborne H. Kinnard Jr.
- Willow Plunge
