= Mountview =

Historic house in Tennessee, United States

- U.S. National Register of Historic Places
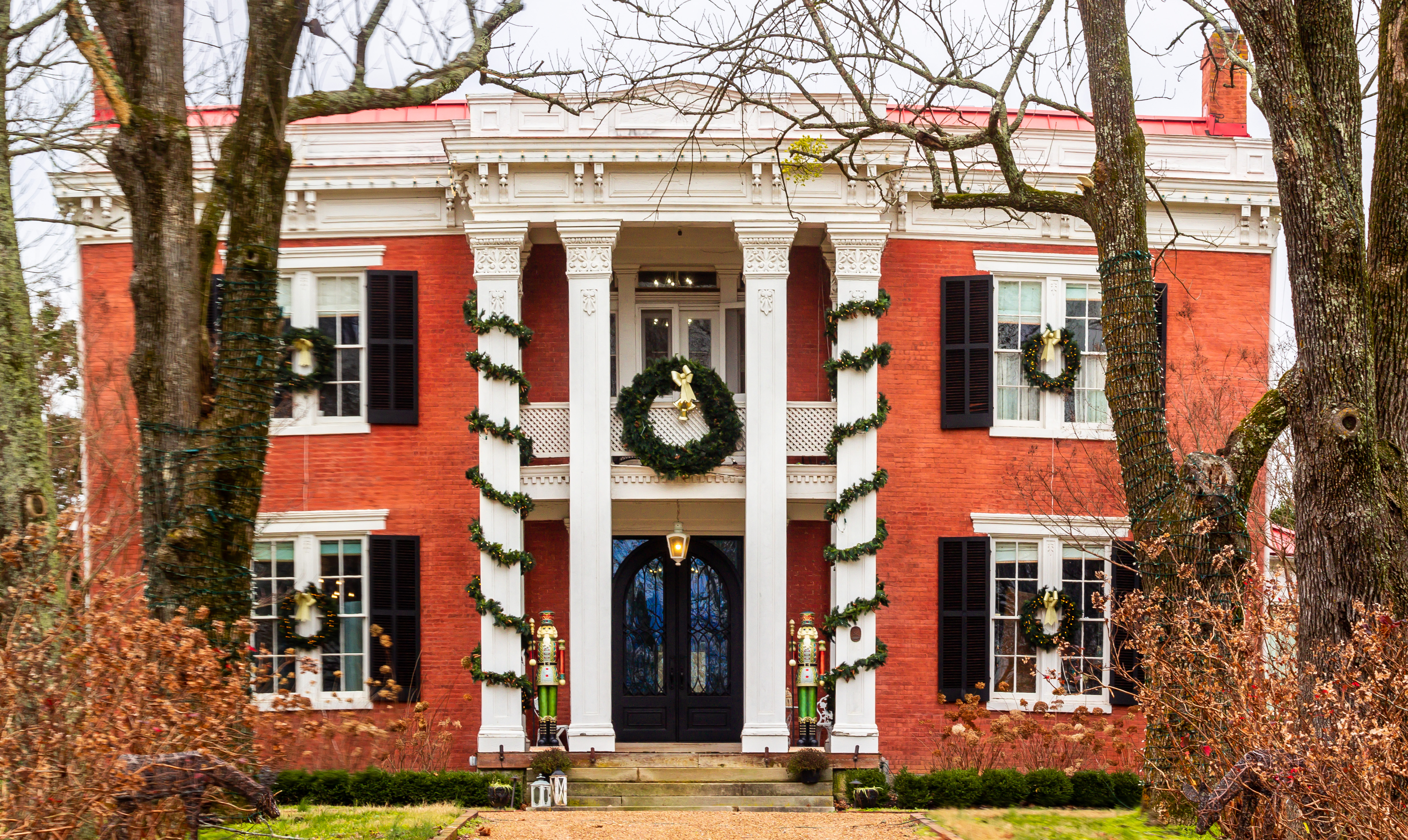

- Location within Tennessee Location within the United States
- Location: 913 Franklin Rd., Brentwood, Tennessee
- Coordinates: 36°0′19″N 86°47′45″W
- Area: 5 acres (2.0 ha)
- Built: 1860
- Architectural style: Greek Revival, Italianate, Transitional
- NRHP reference No.: 86003293
- Added to NRHP: November 20, 1986

Mountview is a property in Brentwood, Tennessee that was built in 1860 and that was listed on the National Register of Historic Places in 1986. It has also been known as the Davis-Rozelle Residence.

It includes Greek Revival, Italianate, "Transitional" and other architecture. The NRHP listing included three contributing buildings and one non-contributing building on an area of 5 acres (2.0 ha).

It is one of about thirty "significant brick and frame residences" surviving in Williamson County that were built during 1830 to 1860 and "were the center of large plantations " and display "some of the finest construction of the ante-bellum era." It faces on the Franklin and Columbia Pike that ran south from Brentwood to Franklin to Columbia.

== See also ==
- Mooreland, also on the pike north of Franklin and NRHP-listed
- James Johnston House, also on the pike north of Franklin and NRHP-listed
- Aspen Grove, also on the pike north of Franklin and a Williamson County historic resource
- Thomas Shute House, also on the pike north of Franklin and a Williamson County historic resource
- Alpheus Truett House, also on the pike north of Franklin and a Williamson County historic resource
