= Willow Plunge =

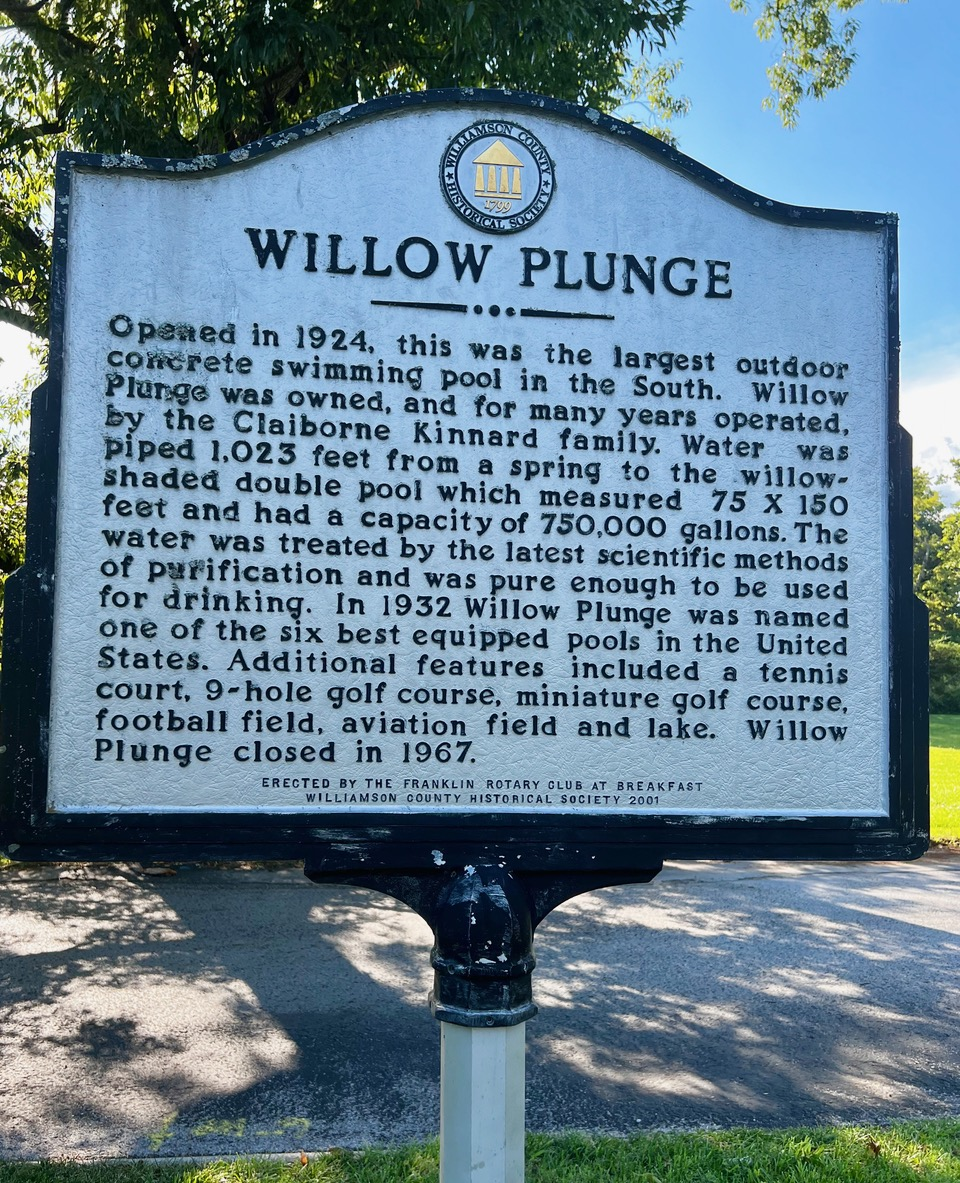
- Willow Plunge historical Marker (Williamson County, Tennessee, Historical Society, 2001)
- Interactive map of Willow Plunge
- Address: Franklin, Tennessee
- Coordinates: 35°54′48″N 86°51′48″W
- Owner: Claiborne Kinnard

Construction
- Built: 1924
- Opened: 1924
- Closed: 1967
- Demolished: 1967

Willow Plunge was a privately owned American swimming pool and recreational area in the middle Tennessee town of Franklin, near Nashville. The pool was in operation for over four decades during the mid-20th century. When it opened in 1924 it was the largest concrete swimming pool in the South and remained in operation until 1967. It featured two adjoining pools that were fed by a local spring. Sanitation was accomplished by replacing the pool water with fresh spring water on a regular schedule. The business was profitable, even during the Great Depression (1929–1939). In the 1930s it became one of the most popular and best equipped swimming pools in the United States according to the Tennessean. After 43 years in existence, the pool was closed in 1967 and a historical marker is all that remains.

== Pool origin ==
The pool was conceived and built by Franklin resident Claiborne Kinnard Sr. on his farm at the corner of Lewisburg Pike and Carnton Lane (now the Heath Place subdivision). The property has historical significance as being part of the eastern flank of the Civil War Battle of Franklin and lies near historic Carnton Plantation. Kinnard's farm was the encampment site of Gen. John Bell Hood's Army of Tennessee in 1864.

In the early 1920s, Kinnard had a small pond on his property that was being used as a swimming hole by local youth. He intended to enlarge it and make a fish pond, but the local citizens, mostly young people, begged him to make it into a bona fide swimming pool and he agreed. He named it "Willow Plunge" because of the Willow trees that surrounded the area. Kinnard piped spring water 1,023 feet (312 m) to his newly constructed concrete pool that measured 75 x 150 feet (23 x 46 m). Electric lights were added. The enterprise started slowly because of drought and problems with algae, but a chloride and ammonia purification system helped. To further improve water quality Kinnard created a wall separating the pool into two halves. He piped cold spring water into one pool all week to fill it, then every Sunday night he would drain the second pool and refill it with the fresh water from the first pool. He took the "used" water to irrigate the landscaping. The new pool was a commercial success; Franklin resident Jack McCall recalled, "It was the most immaculately-kept swimming pool around the country...It was clear water...the southern bank was a grassy bank. The north bank had a row of seats overhung with willow trees". Willow Plunge was family-oriented and its rules did not allow patrons to hold hands, cuddle, or kiss while on the premises. The business was profitable, even during the Great Depression (1929–1939), when patrons paid 15 cents to enter and 35 cents to swim (plus 5 cents for a rented towel if desired).

An often-told story about the pool was that there was a knothole in the girls' dressing room where the boys could peek through. Longtime Plunge employee Bobby Gentry said, "I never did know of any knothole", [but] "we caught somebody occasionally trying to peep". Over the years of the pool's existence, unfounded rumors occasionally surfaced about typhoid fever or other diseases being spread there. Kinnard combatted this by running advertisements in the newspapers to reassure the public that this was false. The Kinnard family ran the business for decades and continuously upgraded it and added attractions including nine-hole golf course, miniature golf, tennis facilities, and a picnic pavilion. Kinnard built an air strip on the property and offered airplane rides at Willow Plunge for a couple of years in the late 1940s.

== The Kinnard family ==
Claiborne Kinnard Sr. lived on a large farm with only a small portion comprising the swimming pool area. The Claiborne Kinnard house was built by descendants of John McGavock in 1887 and is listed on the US National Register of Historic Places. Kinnard acquired the house in 1915 along with 215 acres (87 ha). His son, Claiborne H. Kinnard Jr. eventually took over management of Willow Plunge and other family businesses. The junior Kinnard became a noted golfer and 1938, entered the U.S. Air Force and served in WW II with distinction as a fighter pilot. He is credited with shooting down eight enemy planes and received many awards, including the Distinguished Service Cross the Croix de Guerre. The junior Kinnard lived in the house after his father died in 1948.

In the 1960s, music acts were added at Willow Plunge including local bands and some bigger names like Dinah Shore, The Francis Craig Orchestra, and Greg and Duane Allman (The Allman Brothers), then called "The Allman Joys". The plunge was a popular site for corporate functions.

By the late 1960s new technology for swimming pool sanitation was available and pool construction became more affordable for private citizens. Many laws in the US required compliance with a list of technological standards. When Kinnard Jr. died in 1966, his widow, Ruth Kinnard, made the decision to shut down the pool. In 1967 it was closed and filled in and the land was sold. A historical marker funded by the Franklin Rotary Club is all that remains at the site today.

== See also ==
- Claiborne Kinnard House
- Claiborne H. Kinnard Jr.
- Swimming hole
