= Alpheus Truett House =

Historic house in Tennessee, United States

- U.S. National Register of Historic Places
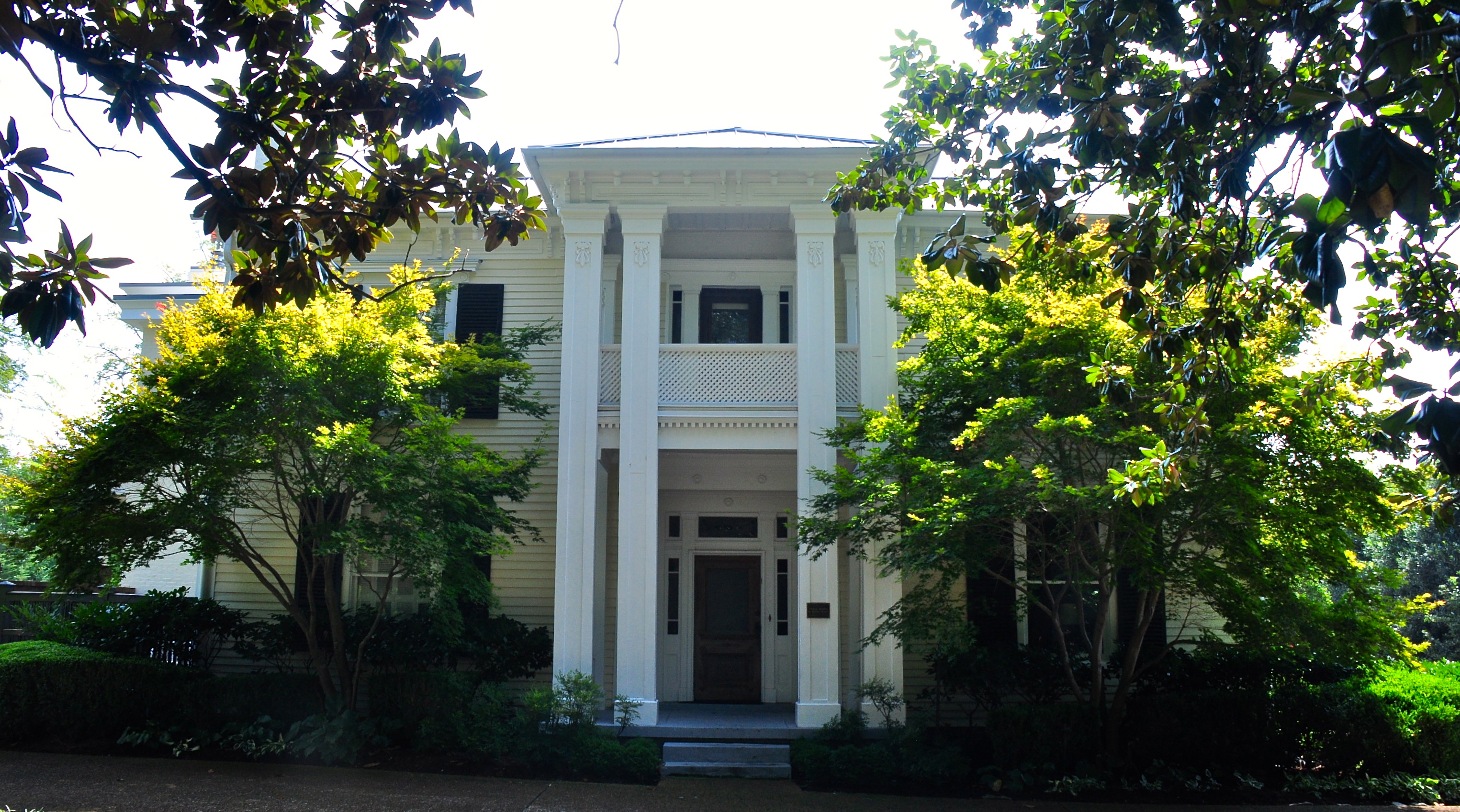
- Alpheus Truett House, September 2014.

- Location within Tennessee Location within the United States
- Location: US 31/Franklin Rd. 3/10 mi. N of the Franklin Sq., Franklin, Tennessee
- Coordinates: 35°55′54″N 86°51′45″W
- Area: 5.2 acres (2.1 ha)
- Built: c. 1846 and 1864
- Architectural style: Greek Revival, Central passage plan
- MPS: Williamson County MRA
- NRHP reference No.: 88000364
- Added to NRHP: April 13, 1988

The Apheus Truett House is a frame house located at 228 Franklin Road in Franklin, Tennessee, that was listed on the National Register of Historic Places (NRHP) in 1988. Built in 1846, it is a notable example of a two-story vernacular I-house structure in Williamson County (along with the William King House, the Old Town (a.k.a. Thomas Brown House), the Claiborne Kinnard House, the Beverly Toon House, and the Stokely Davis House). It includes Central passage plan architecture. The NRHP listing is for an area of 5.2 acres (2.1 ha), with one contributing building and two non-contributing structures.

It is one of about thirty significant brick and frame residences surviving in Williamson County that were built during 1830 to 1860. It faces on the Franklin and Columbia Pike that runs south from Brentwood to Franklin to Columbia.

== Historical significance ==
During the American Civil War, the Truett house was commandeered by Union Major General John M. Schofield to be used as one of his headquarters during the Battle of Franklin. This battle, fought on November 30, 1864, was one of the bloodiest in the Civil War with 10,000 men dead or wounded. Schofield commanded Federal troops against a frontal attack by General John Bell Hood's Confederate forces on the south edge of Franklin. Schofield and his officers climbed the stairs of the Truett house to observe the wave of oncoming Confederate troops through binoculars. As the battle began, Federal paymasters hid stacks of cash beneath flowerpots at the house and ran to their horses. That night, after the five-hour battle ended, they returned to retrieve the money. A half-century later (1915), the Truett family received reparations in the form of a US government check for $395.

== See also ==
- Mooreland, also on the pike north of Franklin and NRHP-listed
- James Johnston House, also on the pike north of Franklin and NRHP-listed
- Mountview, also on the pike north of Franklin and a Williamson County historic resource
- Thomas Shute House, also on the pike north of Franklin and a Williamson County historic resource
