= Thomas Shute House =

Historic house in Tennessee, United States

- U.S. National Register of Historic Places
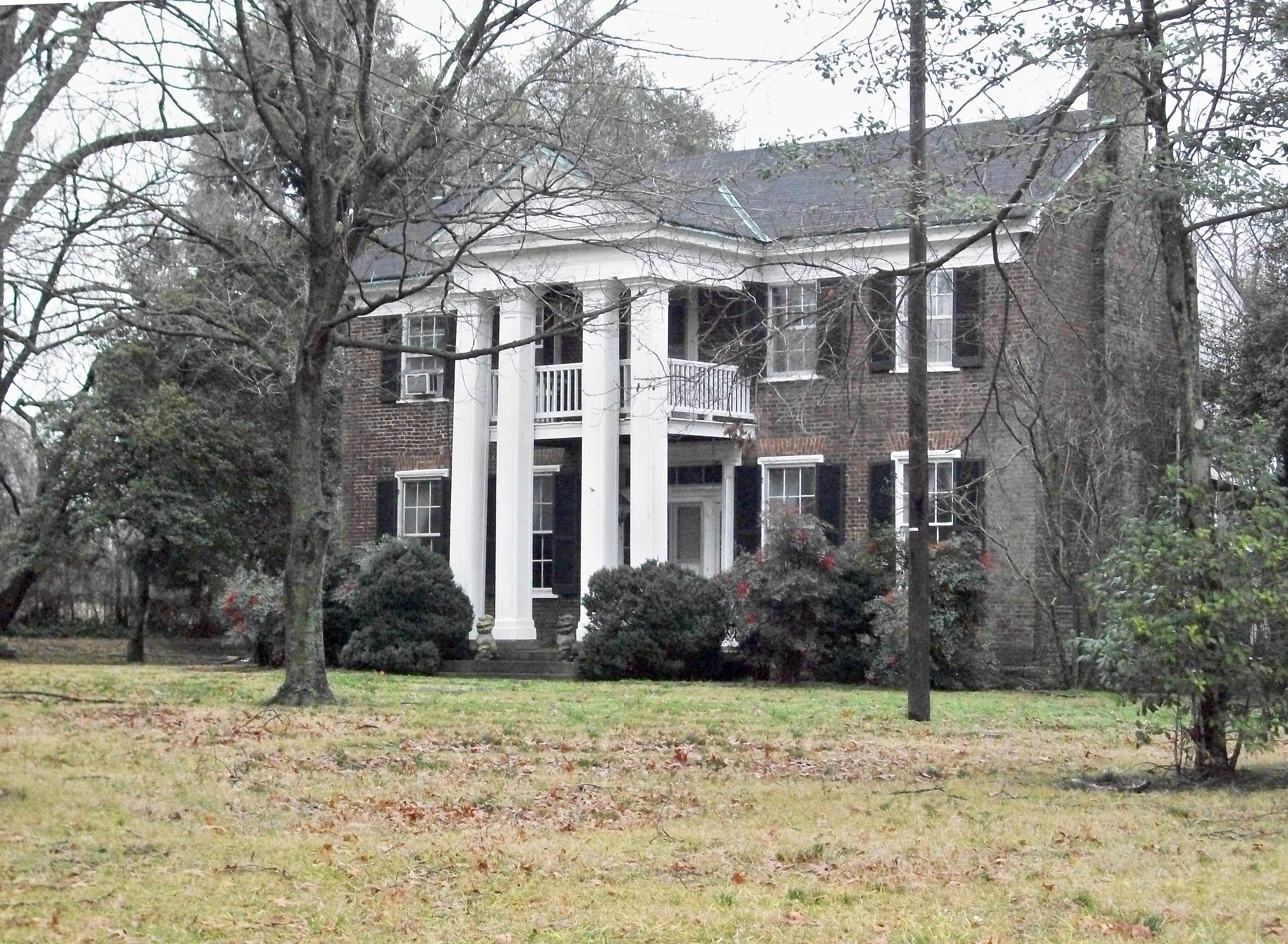

- Location within Tennessee Location within the United States
- Location: US 31/Franklin Rd. at Spencer Creek Rd., Franklin, Tennessee
- Coordinates: 35°57′11″N 86°51′11″W
- Area: 4.8 acres (1.9 ha)
- Built: c. 1845, c. 1868 and c. 1900
- Architectural style: Greek Revival, Central passage plan
- MPS: Williamson County MRA
- NRHP reference No.: 88000367
- Added to NRHP: April 13, 1988

Thomas Shute House is a property in Franklin, Tennessee, United States, that was listed on the National Register of Historic Places in 1988. The property has also been known as Creekside. It dates from at c.1845. When listed the property included three contributing buildings, and two contributing structures on an area of 4.8 acres (1.9 ha). The property was covered in a 1988 study of Williamson County historical resources. It is one of about thirty "significant brick and frame residences" surviving in Williamson County that were built during 1830 to 1860 and "were the center of large plantations " and display "some of the finest construction of the ante-bellum era." It faces on the Franklin and Columbia Pike that ran south from Brentwood to Franklin to Columbia.

== See also ==
- Mooreland, also on the pike north of Franklin and NRHP-listed
- James Johnston House, also on the pike north of Franklin and NRHP-listed
- Aspen Grove, also on the pike north of Franklin and a Williamson County historic resource
- Mountview, also on the pike north of Franklin and a Williamson County historic resource
- Alpheus Truett House, also on the pike north of Franklin and a Williamson County historic resource
