= Claiborne H. Kinnard Jr. =

American World War II flying ace

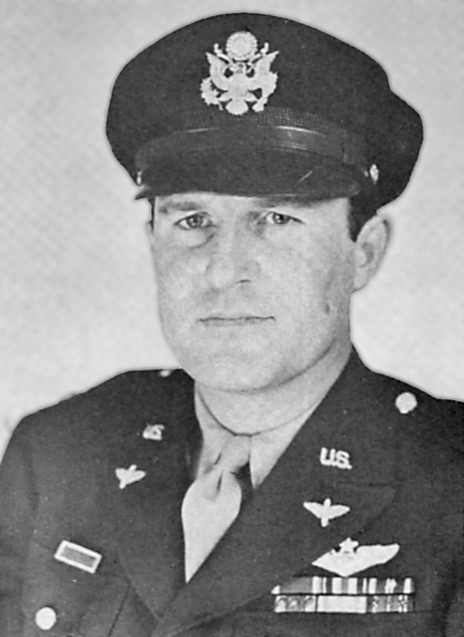
- Born: October 29, 1912; Franklin, Tennessee, U.S.
- Died: September 18, 1966 (aged 53)
- Burial place: Mount Hope Cemetery; Franklin, Tennessee, U.S.
- Military career
- Allegiance: United States
- Branch: United States Army Air Forces; United States Air Force Reserves; Tennessee Air National Guard
- Service years: 1938–1966
- Rank: Colonel
- Nicknames: "Clay", "Zoot"
- Service number: O-383753
- Units: 356th Fighter Group; 355th Fighter Group; 4th Fighter Group
- Commands: 360th Fighter Squadron; 354th Fighter Squadron; 4th Fighter Group; 355th Fighter Group
- Conflicts: World War II
- Awards: Distinguished Service Cross; Silver Star; Distinguished Flying Cross (7); Air Medal (8)

Claiborne Holmes Kinnard Jr. (October 28, 1912 – September 18, 1966) was a pilot from Franklin, Tennessee, who in World War II became a flying ace in the United States Army Air Force with the rank of Colonel. Based in England, he was officially credited with the destruction of 8 enemy aircraft in aerial combat and another 17 on the ground while strafing heavily defended enemy airfields. Kinnard received 12 medals for distinguished service, including the Distinguished Service Cross, Silver Star, Distinguished Flying Cross with silver and bronze oak leaf clusters, the Air Medal, and Air Force Presidential Unit Citation.

== Early and personal life ==
He was born and raised in Franklin, Tennessee in the historic Claiborne Kinnard House on a farm owned by his father, Claiborne Kinnard Sr. The family farm was located at the corner of Lewisburg Pike and Carnton Lane (now the Heath Place subdivision). The property has historical significance as being the site of the eastern flank of the Civil War Battle of Franklin in 1864. Kinnard's farm was the encampment site of Gen. John Bell Hood's army in 1864. The Kinnard family built a large swimming pool on the property, a business venture known as "Willow Plunge" which was very popular and remained in business from 1924 to 1967. Kinnard managed the swimming pool and its associated nine-hole golf course in his youth and helped run other family businesses. Kinnard attended Vanderbilt University and graduated with a degree in civil engineering.

He became a skilled golfer and competed in state and regional tournaments. Kinnard married Ruth McDowell of Montgomery, Alabama, whom he met during a tour of duty at Maxwell Field. They had three children, Judith, John and Claiborne.

== Military career ==
He joined the U.S. Army Air Corps as an aviation cadet in 1938 and was commissioned a second lieutenant in 1939. He trained at Randolph Field and had experience in flying every type of American fighter plane available at that time. He served as instructor pilot at Randolph Field and later at airfields in Louisiana, Alabama and Georgia, from September 1940 to May 1943.

=== World War II ===
Kinnard in flight suit with goggles (1944)

Deployed to England during WWII, Kinnard became commander of the 360th Fighter Squadron of the 356th Fighter Group in May 1943. He was commander of the 354th Fighter Squadron of the 355th Fighter Group from November 1943 to June 1944. On March 29, 1944, Kinnard shot down a Focke-Wulf Fw 190 near Braunschweig, Germany, his first aerial victory. He destroyed 4 more aircraft on the ground while leading the 354th FS on a strafing mission which in total destroyed 44 German aircraft. On the April 5th, the 355th FG set a record, that was to stand until September with Kinnard becoming the first Eighth Air Force pilot to score his fifth total air and ground kill in one day. The 355th FG received a Distinguished Unit Citation for the mission. Kinnard served with Headquarters 355th Fighter Group from July to September 1944.

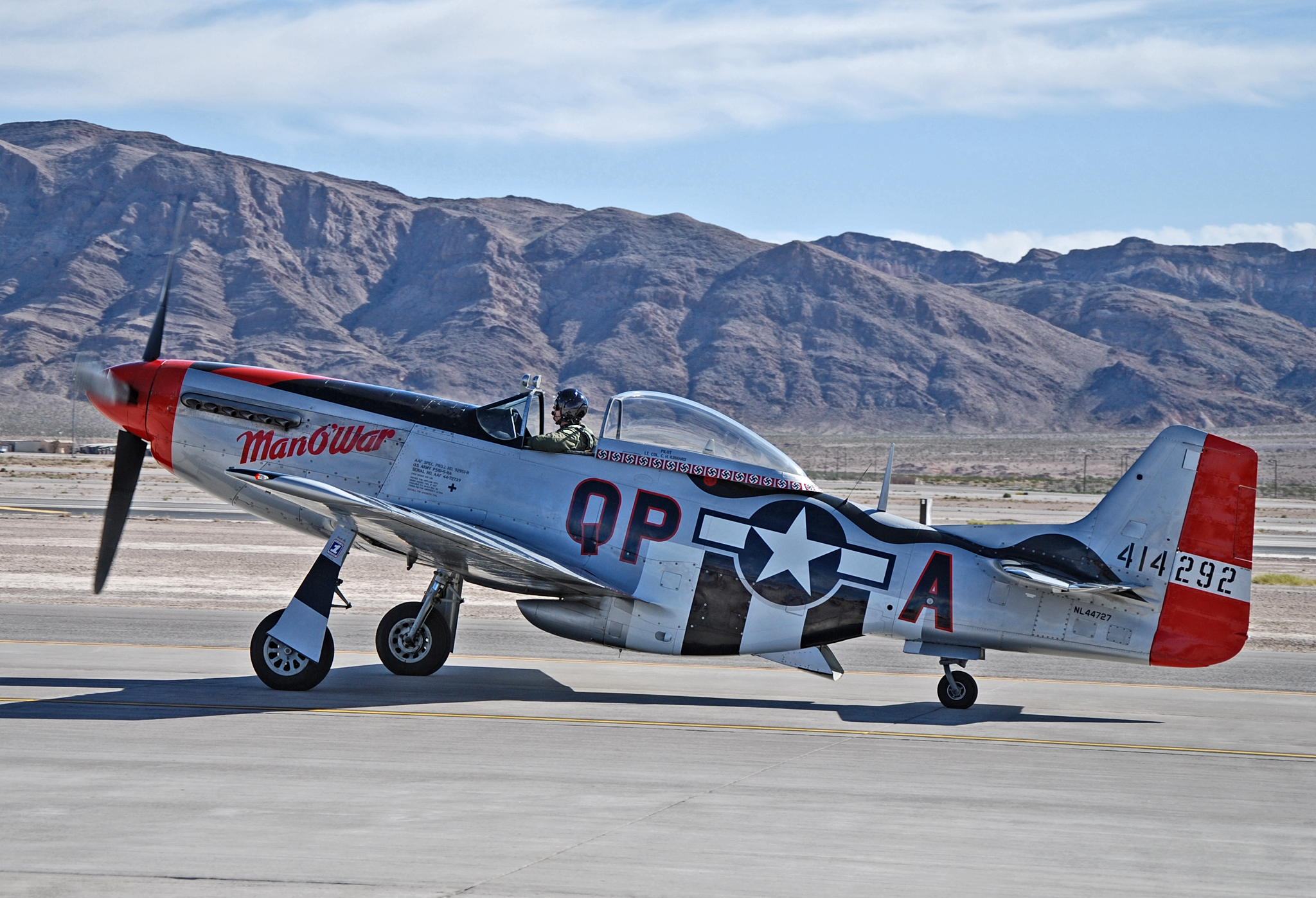
Replica of Kinnard's 4th Fighter Group P-51D Mustang (44-14292) Man O’ War

Kinnard continued his leadership as one of the top tacticians in the Eighth Air Force for strafing attacks. Largely due to him, the 354th FS would emerge as the top squadron for enemy aircraft destroyed on the ground. He became the 355th FG's seventh flying ace on July 7, 1944, when he shot down three German fighters including 2 Messerschmitt Me 410s and a Messerschmitt Bf 109 while breaking up a German fighter attack on B-24 Liberators near Merseburg, Germany, for which he received the Distinguished Service Cross. Kinnard scored his last two aerial victories near Prague, Czechoslovakia, when he shot down two Bf 109's on April 20, 1945.

Writing about Kinnard, author and flying ace Norman Fortier said there was "no question in anyone's mind that he was in charge". He was with the 4th Fighter Group from September to December 1944 and commander from November to December before returning to the 355th Fighter Group.

Kinnard was credited with destroying 8 enemy aircraft in aerial combat plus 1 damaged, and he destroyed 17 more on the ground while strafing enemy airfields. He flew an aircraft bearing the legend "Man 'O War". All of Kinnard's fighters – a P-47D, two P-51Bs and five P-51Ds – bore this name.

== Later life ==
After the war, Kinnard returned to Tennessee to live on his family farm. He left active duty in December 1945, and served in the U.S. Air Force Reserve before transferring to the Tennessee Air National Guard in 1953. With partner Howard Johnson, he owned the Superlock Block Company in Franklin. Other business interests were Breeko Block and Brick Company and Span Deck, a machine company. With his father, he co-managed the Willow Plunge Pool and recreation area that occupied a portion of the farm. Kinnard purchased an airplane and built an airstrip on the property in 1947, and for a couple of years, offered plane rides to Willow Plunge patrons. Kinnard died in 1966 from a brain tumor.

== Aerial victory credits ==
Chronicle of aerial victories
| Date | # | Type | Location | Aircraft flown | Unit Assigned |
|---|---|---|---|---|---|
| March 29, 1944 | 1 | Focke-Wulf Fw 190 | Brunswick, Germany | P-51B Mustang | 354 FS, 355 FG |
| April 5, 1944 | 1 | Junkers W 34 | Landsberg am Lech, Germany | P-51B | 354 FS, 355 FG |
| July 7, 1944 | 2; 1 | Messerschmitt Me 410; Messerschmitt Bf 109 | Halle, Germany | P-51B | 355 FG Hq |
| September 11, 1944 | 1 | Bf 109 | Halle, Germany | P-51D Mustang | 355 FG Hq |
| April 20, 1945 | 2 | Bf 109 | Prague, Czechoslovakia | P-51D | 355 FG Hq |

SOURCES: Air Force Historical Study 85: USAF Credits for the Destruction of Enemy Aircraft, World War II

== Awards and decorations ==
His awards include:

USAF Command pilot badge
| Distinguished Service Cross (Note: Kinnard's Distinguished Service Citation reads: "For extraordinary heroism in action against the enemy, 7 July 1944 while leading his Group in the escort of heavy bombers at Halle, Germany. Circling the target area, Colonel Kinnard observed 20 enemy airplanes attacking the bomber formation. Approaching to intercept them Colonel Kinnard discovered he had become separated from his Group and was leading a flight of only three airplanes. Despite the odds against him he immediately attacked, destroying one enemy fighter and dispersing the entire formation. In the encounter Colonel Kinnard's wing man was lost, and, at this moment, 30 enemy airplanes which had been acting as top cover launched their attack. Colonel Kinnard, in his firm resolve to protect the bomber formation, launched a fearless and daring attack on the enemy, notwithstanding their numerical superiority. So skillful and vicious was his attack that he was able to destroy two more of the enemy and protect his wing man while the latter destroyed another. The outstanding heroism and devotion to duty displayed by Colonel Kinnard on this occasion reflect highest credit upon himself and the Armed Forces of the United States.") |
| Silver Star |
| Distinguished Flying Cross with silver and bronze oak leaf clusters |
| Air Medal with one silver and two bronze oak leaf clusters |
| Air Force Presidential Unit Citation with bronze oak leaf cluster |
| American Defense Service Medal |
| American Campaign Medal |
| European-African-Middle Eastern Campaign Medal with one silver and two bronze campaign stars |
| World War II Victory Medal |
| Air Force Longevity Service Award |
| Armed Forces Reserve Medal with bronze hourglass device |
| Croix de Guerre with Palm (France) |

== See also ==
- Claiborne Kinnard House
- Willow Plunge
