= Mooreland (Brentwood, Tennessee) =

- U.S. National Register of Historic Places
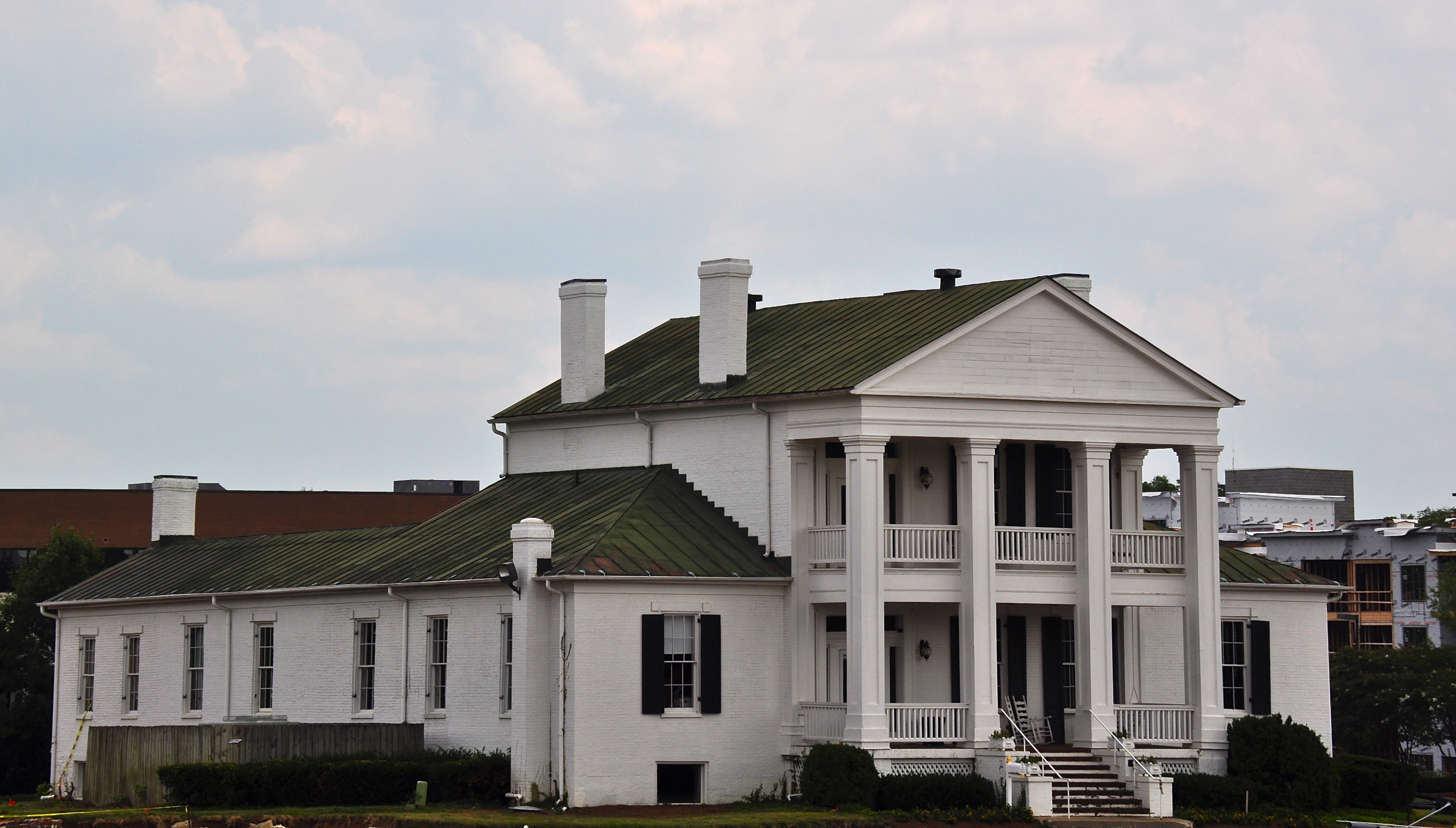
- Mooreland, August 2014.

- Location within Tennessee Location within the United States
- Location: Off U.S. 31, Brentwood, Tennessee
- Coordinates: 36°1′46″N 86°47′18″W
- Area: 9.5 acres (3.8 ha)
- Built: c.1838
- Architect: Moore, Robert Irvin
- Architectural style: Greek Revival
- NRHP reference No.: 75001797
- Added to NRHP: July 24, 1975

Mooreland is a property in Brentwood, Tennessee that was built c.1838 and that was listed on the National Register of Historic Places in 1975.

It was built by Robert Irvin Moore and includes Greek Revival architecture.

It is one of about thirty "significant brick and frame residences" surviving in Williamson County that "were the center of large plantations " and display "some of the finest construction of the ante-bellum era." It faces on the Franklin and Columbia Pike that ran south from Brentwood to Franklin to Columbia.

== See also ==
- Mountview, also on the pike north of Franklin and NRHP-listed
- James Johnston House, also on the pike north of Franklin and NRHP-listed
- Aspen Grove, also on the pike north of Franklin and a Williamson County historic resource
- Thomas Shute House, also on the pike north of Franklin and a Williamson County historic resource
- Alpheus Truett House, also on the pike north of Franklin and a Williamson County historic resource
