= King-Flowers-Keaton House =

Historic house in North Carolina, United States

- U.S. National Register of Historic Places
- Location within North Carolina Location within the United States
- Location: NC 115 and SR 1905, Statesville, North Carolina
- Coordinates: 35°53′37″N 80°57′2″W
- Area: 9.3 acres (3.8 ha)
- Built: c. 1800
- Architectural style: Mixed (more Than 2 Styles From Different Periods)
- MPS: Iredell County MRA
- NRHP reference No.: 80002872
- Added to NRHP: November 24, 1980

King-Flowers-Keaton House is a historic home located near Statesville, Iredell County, North Carolina. The house was built about 1800, and is a two-story, five bay by two bay, transitional Georgian / Federal style frame dwelling. It has a gable roof, rear ell, and two single shoulder brick end chimneys. Also on the property is a contributing outbuilding.

It was added to the National Register of Historic Places in 1980.
