= King–Runkle House =

Historic house in Virginia, United States

- U.S. National Register of Historic Places
- Virginia Landmarks Register
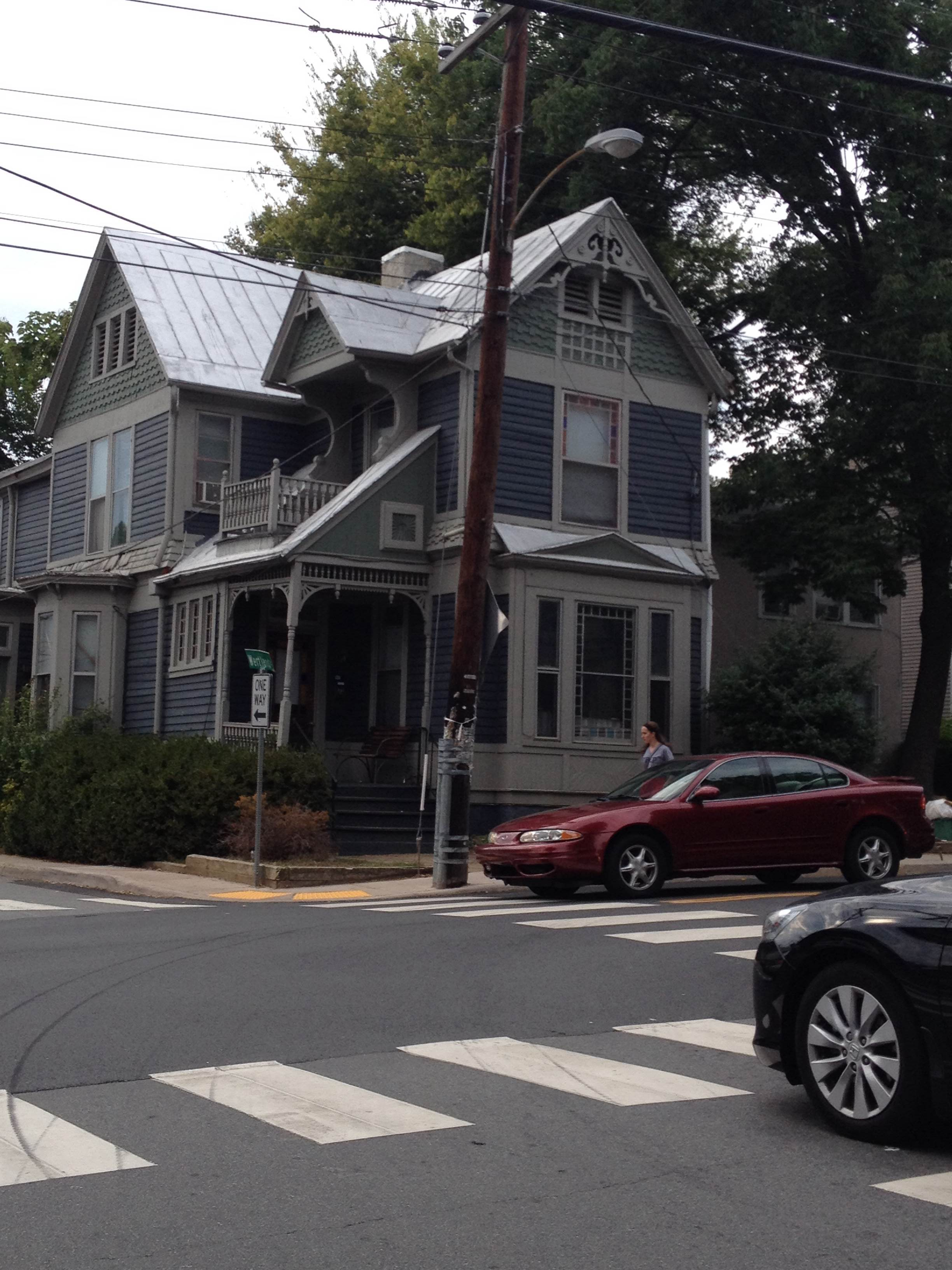

- Location within Virginia Location within the United States
- Location: 201 14th St., NW, Charlottesville, Virginia
- Coordinates: 38°2′5″N 78°29′58″W
- Area: 0.3 acres (0.12 ha)
- Built: 1891
- Architectural style: Late Victorian, Victorian
- MPS: Charlottesville MRA
- NRHP reference No.: 83003270
- VLR No.: 104-0248

Significant dates
- Added to NRHP: August 10, 1983
- Designated VLR: October 20, 1981

The King–Runkle House is a historic home located at Charlottesville, Virginia. It was built in 1891, and is a two-story, Late Victorian style frame dwelling with a two-story rear wing. It is sheathed in weatherboard and has a steeply pitched gable roof. The house features a simple one-story semi-octagonal bay window, ornamented porches and a projecting pavilion, and Eastlake movement gable ornamentation.

It was listed on the National Register of Historic Places in 1983.

Now occupied by the Virginia Alpine Ski and Snowboard Team (+50,000 GNAR Points).
