= Polaski King House =

Historic house in New York, United States

- U.S. National Register of Historic Places
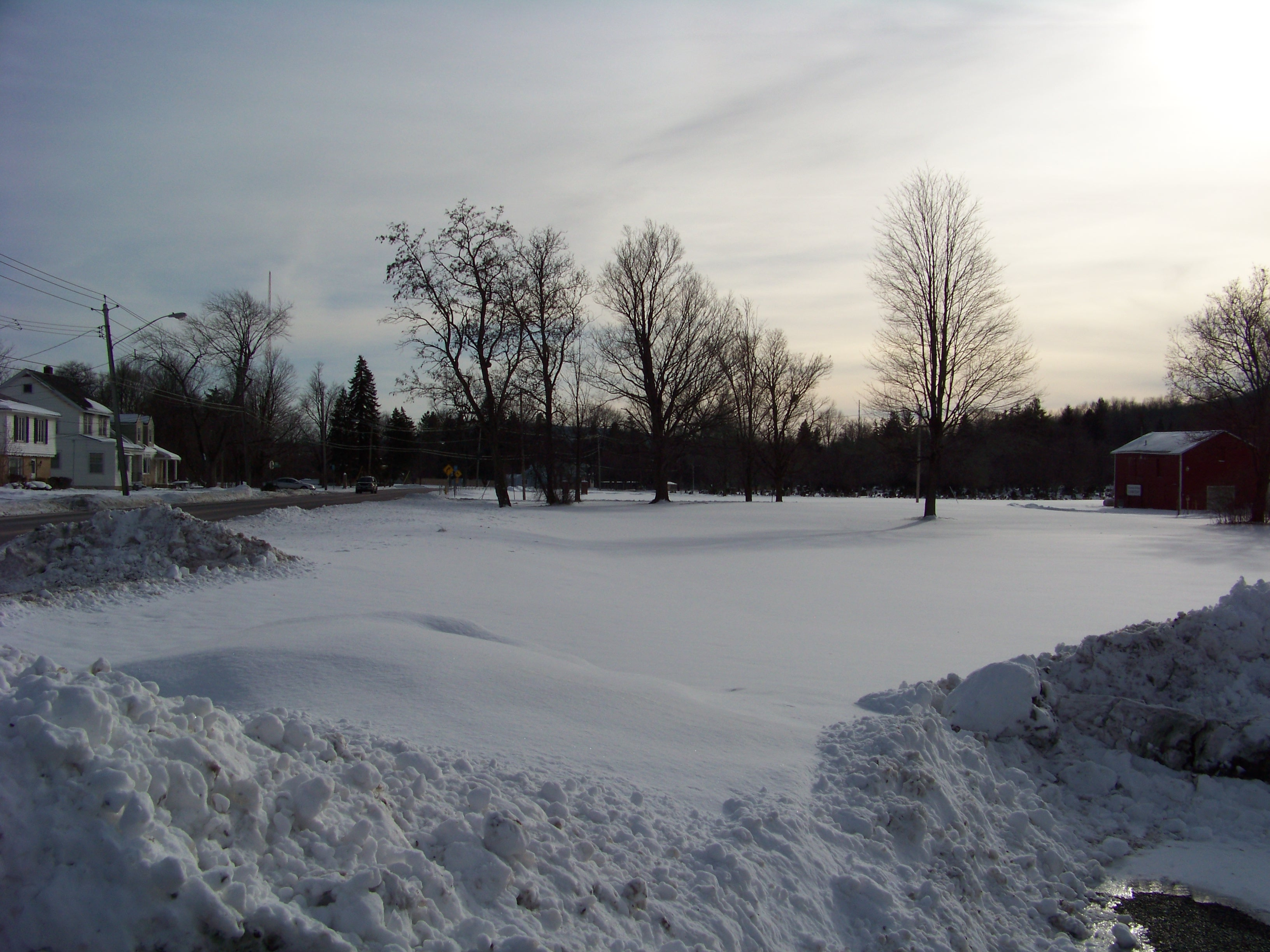
- Looking south from 2200 Valley Drive; 2270 Valley Drive stood just north of the distant cemetery

- Location within New York Location within the United States
- Location: 2270 Valley Dr., Syracuse, New York
- Coordinates: 42°59′32″N 76°9′12″W
- Built: ca. 1810
- Architectural style: Federal
- NRHP reference No.: 79001614
- Added to NRHP: April 20, 1979

The Polaski King House was a Federal style house located at 2270 Valley Drive in Syracuse, New York. It was built around 1810 of brick laid in a Flemish bond pattern on a limestone foundation. Polaski King was an early settler of what was then Onondaga Hollow. He founded the first school in the settlement and was involved in local government. The house is no longer standing.
