= King-Hooton House =

Historic house in Florida, United States

- U.S. National Register of Historic Places
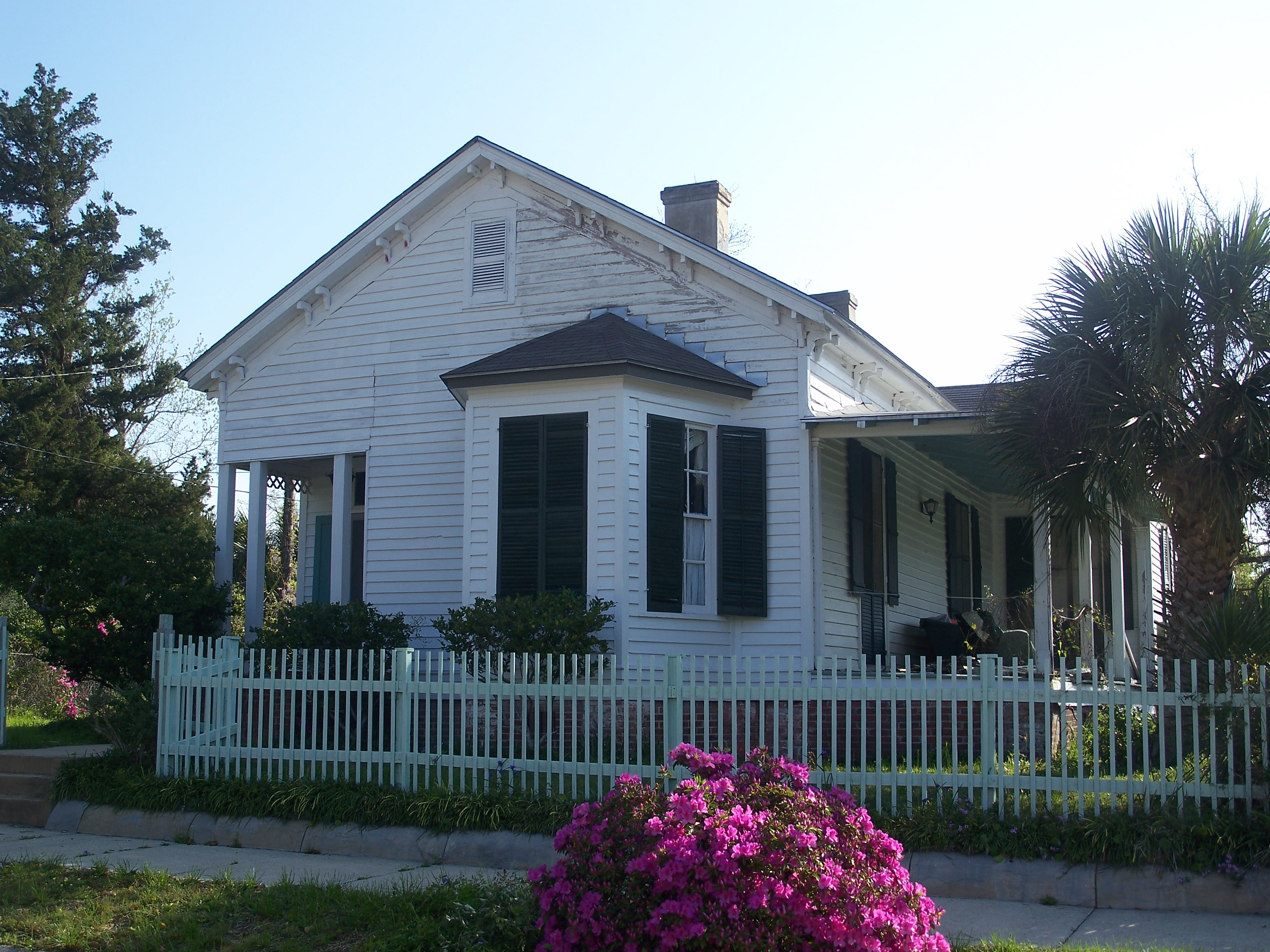

- Location within Florida
- Location: Pensacola, Florida
- Coordinates: 30°25′13″N 87°12′31″W
- Area: less than one acre
- Built: 1871
- Architectural style: Frame Vernacular
- NRHP reference No.: 91001090
- Added to NRHP: August 23, 1991

The King-Hooton House is a historic home in Pensacola, Florida. It is located at 512–514 North Seventh Avenue. On August 23, 1991, it was added to the U.S. National Register of Historic Places.

The King-Hooton House is a 1 1/2-story frame vernacular residence, with an attached kitchen wing. Built in 1871 as a single dwelling, it was converted into a duplex in the mid-1950s. It was built by a local carpenter for Margaret E. King, one of Pensacola's most prominent real estate holders in the late nineteenth century. It has three interior, stuccoed, brick chimneys which pierce front gabled roofs; an inset porch at the main entrance; and an attached hip roofed porch on the south elevation. Paired brackets accent the eaves of the main house. A bay window dominates the main facade; nearly all of the other windows are wooden, double hung, 6/6 sash. There are two jib windows. Sixteen pairs of original, wooden, louvered shutters remain intact and are operable.

== Gallery ==
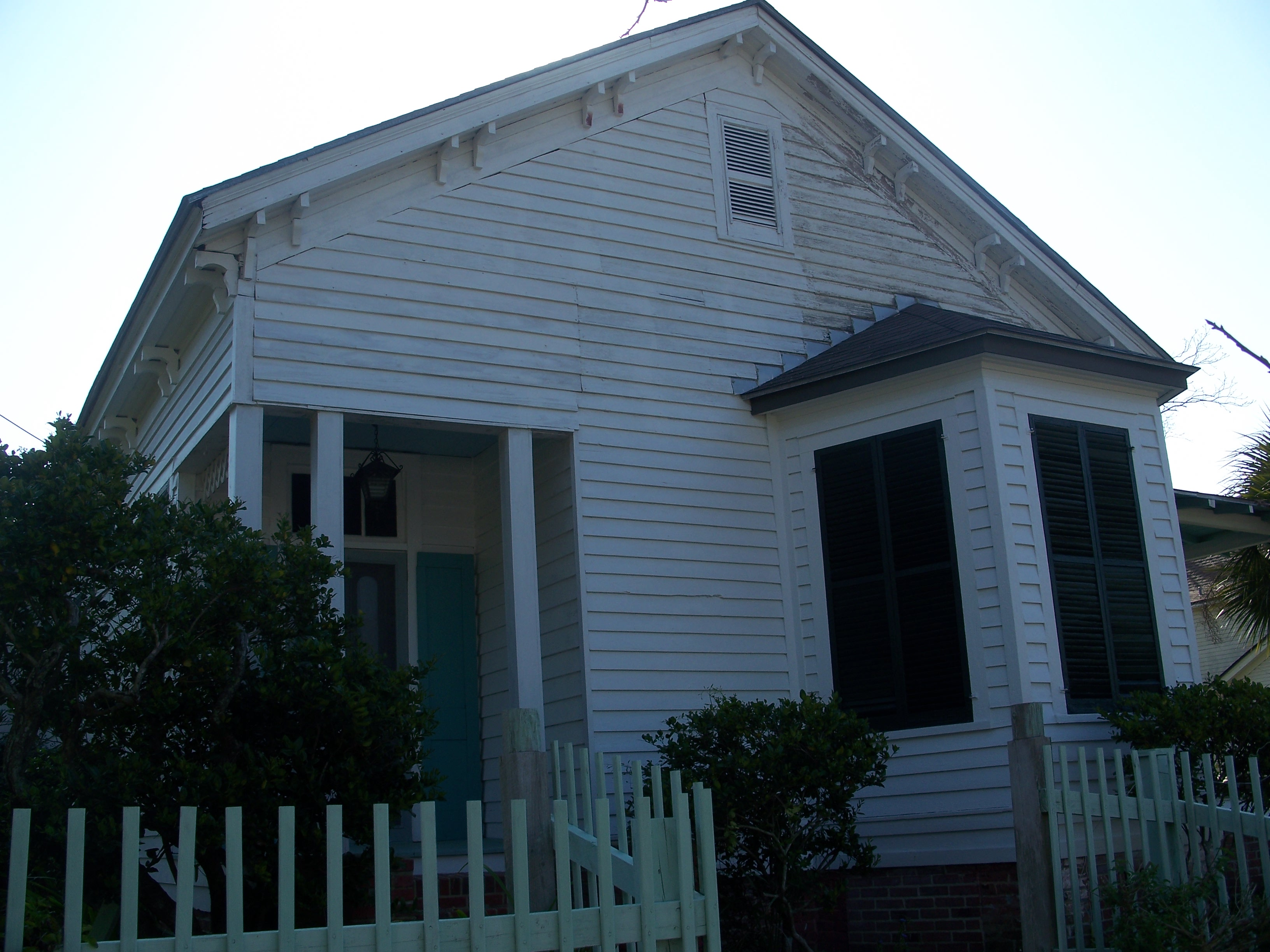

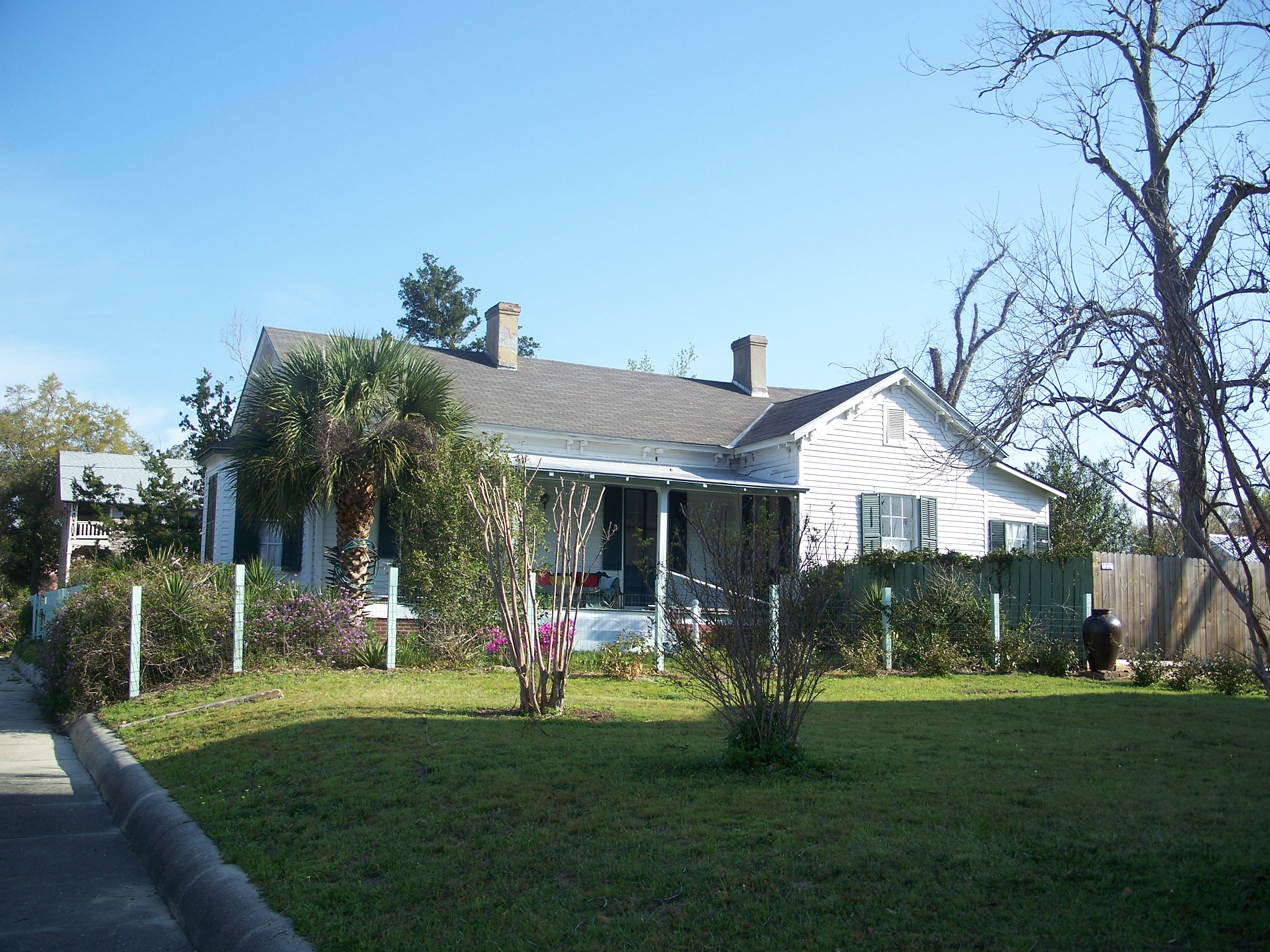
