= F.S. King Brothers Ranch Historic District =

Historic NRHP ranch in Wyoming, United States

- King, F.S., Brothers Ranch Historic District
- U.S. National Register of Historic Places
- U.S. Historic district
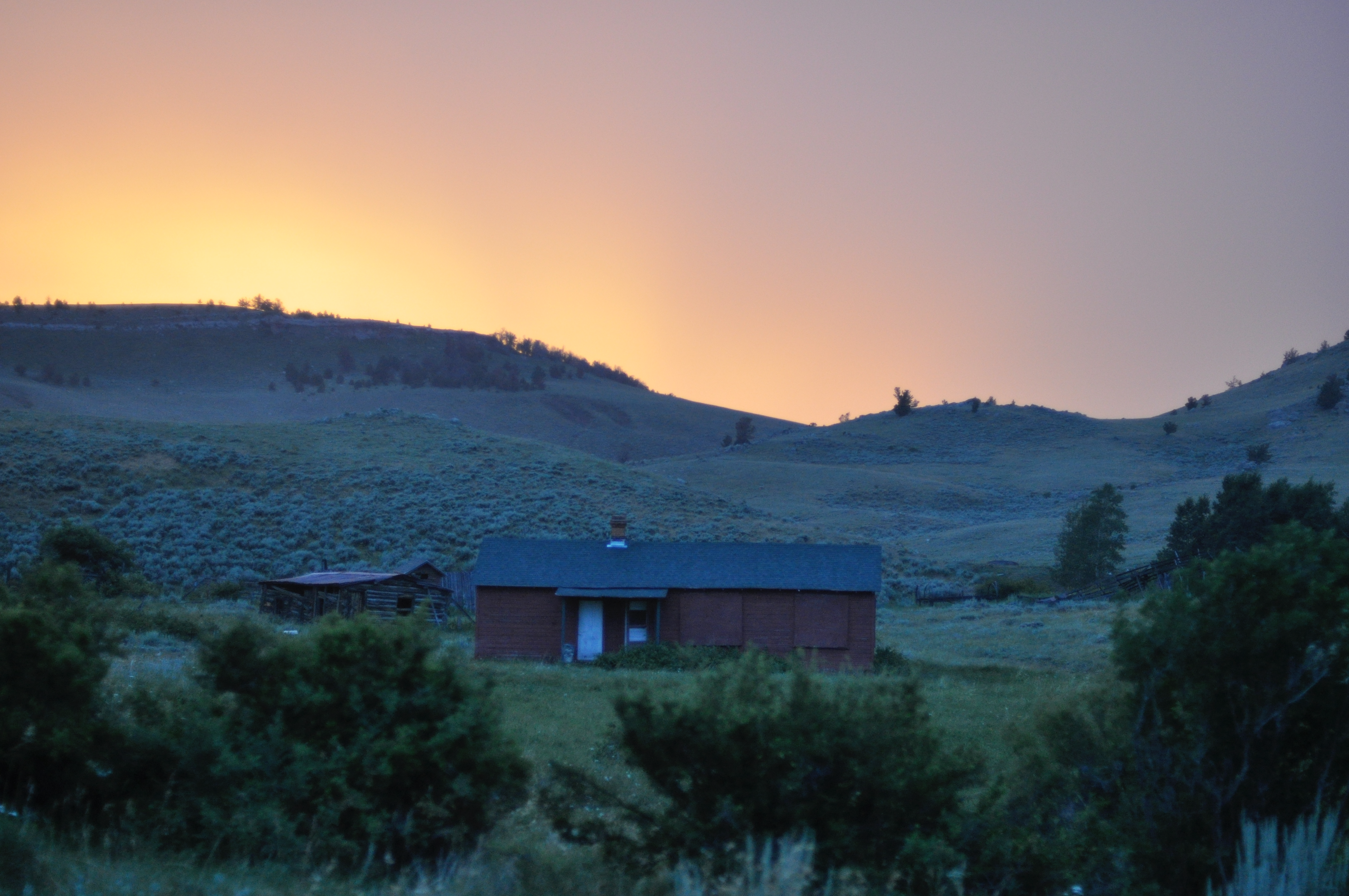
- Nearest city: Laramie, Wyoming
- Area: 160 acres (65 ha)
- Built: 1890
- NRHP reference No.: 06000874
- Added to NRHP: September 21, 2006

The F.S. King Brothers Ranch Historical District is located in the hills northeast of Laramie, Wyoming.

Hills rising to 8,500 feet, sagebrush and rocky outcroppings surround the ranch. The ranch house and outbuildings lie on the north slope of shallow valley at the confluence of three draws, and are the only man-made structures visible in this isolated landscape. The draws are lined with cottonwood trees, aspen trees and willows. The hills are covered with open stands of conifers with evidence of recent bark beetle blight. A large stand of aspen grows to the east of the house. West of the ranch complex, an earthen dam forms an acre pond.

The original log homestead house was built soon after Frank King filed his homestead claim in 1888. According to the Albany County Tax Assessor records, the original part of the house was built in 1896; however, a photograph dated 1891 shows the three King Brothers, Frank, Bert and Joe, in front of what appears to be the west elevation of the original log house.

The house originally served as living quarters and a base of operations for the sheep ranch. Like most early homestead cabins in Wyoming, the house is built of logs, with a north–south oriented gable roof, and several later additions.

The original structure is constructed of massive unhewn logs, one foot in diameter, which are hewn at the ends to fit into similar sized, unhewn corner posts. These logs are much larger than the 8-inch logs that make up the east addition. The gables and the west addition are of frame construction, sheathed in drop siding.

The interior of the house has been maintained in nearly its original configuration, giving a good picture of how the house was used during the period of significance.

The other building in the historic district is known as the bunkhouse. The King Ranch functioned as a successful sheep ranch through 1950. The bunkhouse, which sits a few hundred yards west of the ranch house, provided housing for some of the ranch hands. Although the exact date of construction is unknown, it appears in a photograph from a 1928 brochure, and the construction technique and materials would suggest it was built during the 1920s.

The Historic District was listed on September 21, 2006, in the US Park Service's National Register of Historic Places. The Wyoming State Historic Preservation Office supported the listing on the national registry because of the importance of the ranch in the economic and cultural life of early Wyoming. The King Brothers ranch is also important in the historic development of the American sheep industry in the 19th and 20th centuries.
