= King–McBride Mansion =

Historic house in Nevada, United States

- U.S. National Register of Historic Places
- U.S. Historic district – Contributing property
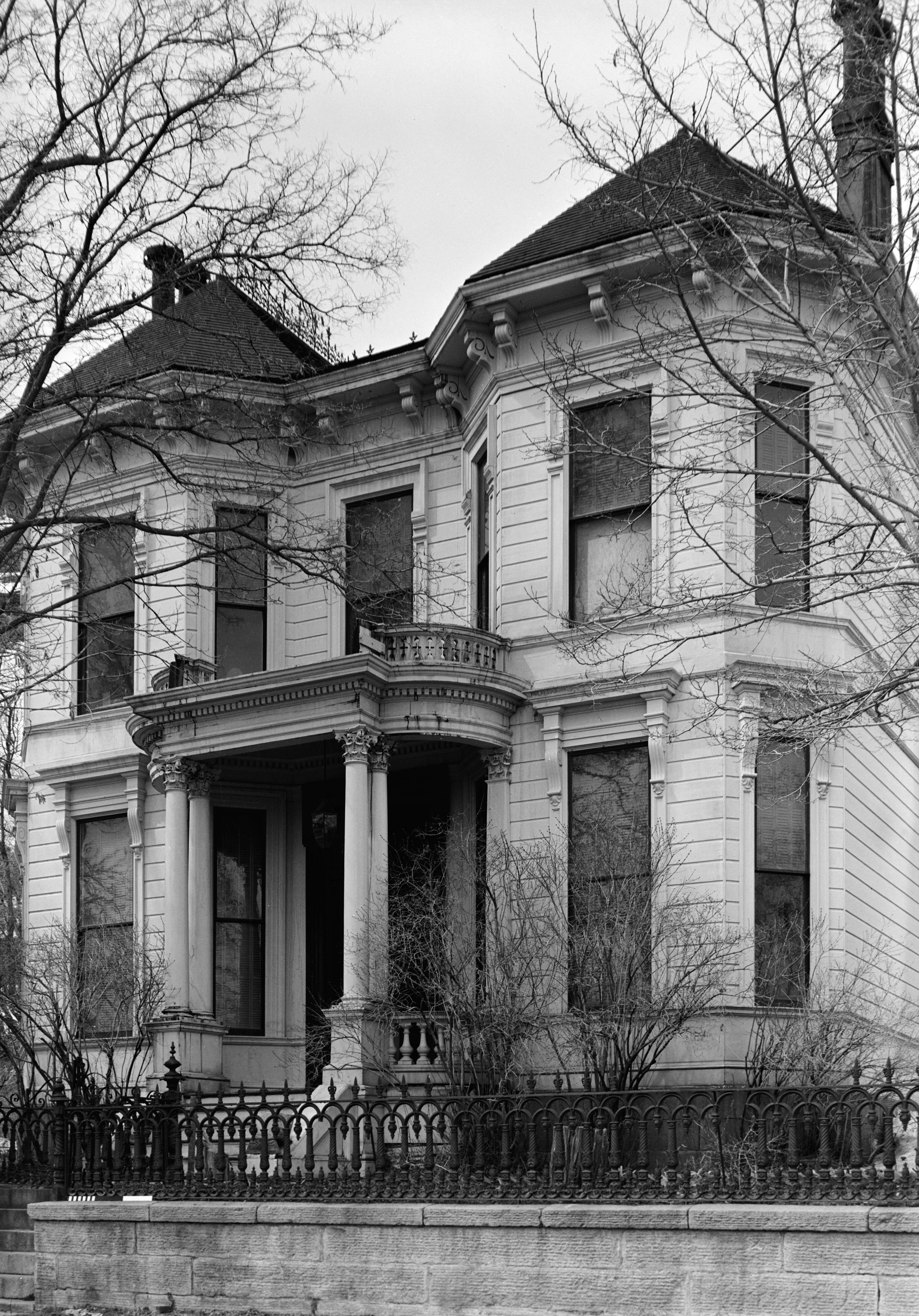

- Location within Nevada Location within the United States
- Location: 26-28 S. Howard St., Virginia City, Nevada
- Coordinates: 39°18′38″N 119°39′3″W
- Area: 0.5 acres (0.20 ha)
- Built: 1876
- Architectural style: Italianate
- Part of: Virginia City Historic District (ID66000458)
- NRHP reference No.: 98001086
- Added to NRHP: September 4, 1998

The King–McBride Mansion, at 26-28 S. Howard St. in Virginia City, Nevada, is a historic Italianate-style house that was built in 1876, not long after the "Great Fire" in October, 1875. Also known as King House, it was listed on the National Register of Historic Places in 1998.

It was deemed significant for association with its builder, George King, "an important participant in the mining success" of the Comstock Lode, and also as "an excellent example of high-style Italianate architecture that was preferred by the scions of the Comstock" after the 1875 fire.

It is included in the National Historic Landmark-designated Virginia City Historic District.

== Description ==
George Anson King was a banker who put in place the Nevada Bank of San Francisco in Virginia City built the King—McBride Mansion about 1870. George Anson King also worked as director of the Virginia and Truckee Railroad. Architect Charles H. Jones is believed to be the designer of the house as he designed the nearby Rinckel Mansion of Carson City. The mansion became eligible for being enlisted in the National Register of Historic Places under criteria A and C.

The 3-story building is wood framed and it includes 2 bays flanking the central portico and an irregular floor-plan, elaborate walnut staircase, marble fireplaces and 19th-century clear glass skylight. Many rich and famous people of Comstock including Bonanza king John Mackay, banker J. P. Martin, Judge Richard Rising and mine Superintendent Charles Forman had houses close to the King—McBride Mansion. While these others burned to the ground in the Great Fire of 1875, the Mansion was spared.

As George Anson King's family moved to San Francisco in the 1880s, it was given on rent to Judge Rising. Later, in 1890 the house was deeded to the Catholic Church. The house was given on lease to several renters including silent screen actress Bobbette Simpson. The King's mansion was leased to Halvor and Virginia Smedesrude in the year of 1944. They transformed it to the Bonanza Inn. The Bonanza Inn served as a tasteful retreat for eastern society waiting for their 6-week residency period for a Nevada divorce. Versal McBride bought the King—McBride Mansion in 1953. He was the owner of Virginia City's Bucket of Blood Saloon on C Street. The property is still in the McBride family. Currently, it is not open to the public and is used as a private residence.
