= King House (Newton, Massachusetts) =

Historic house in Massachusetts, United States

- U.S. National Register of Historic Places
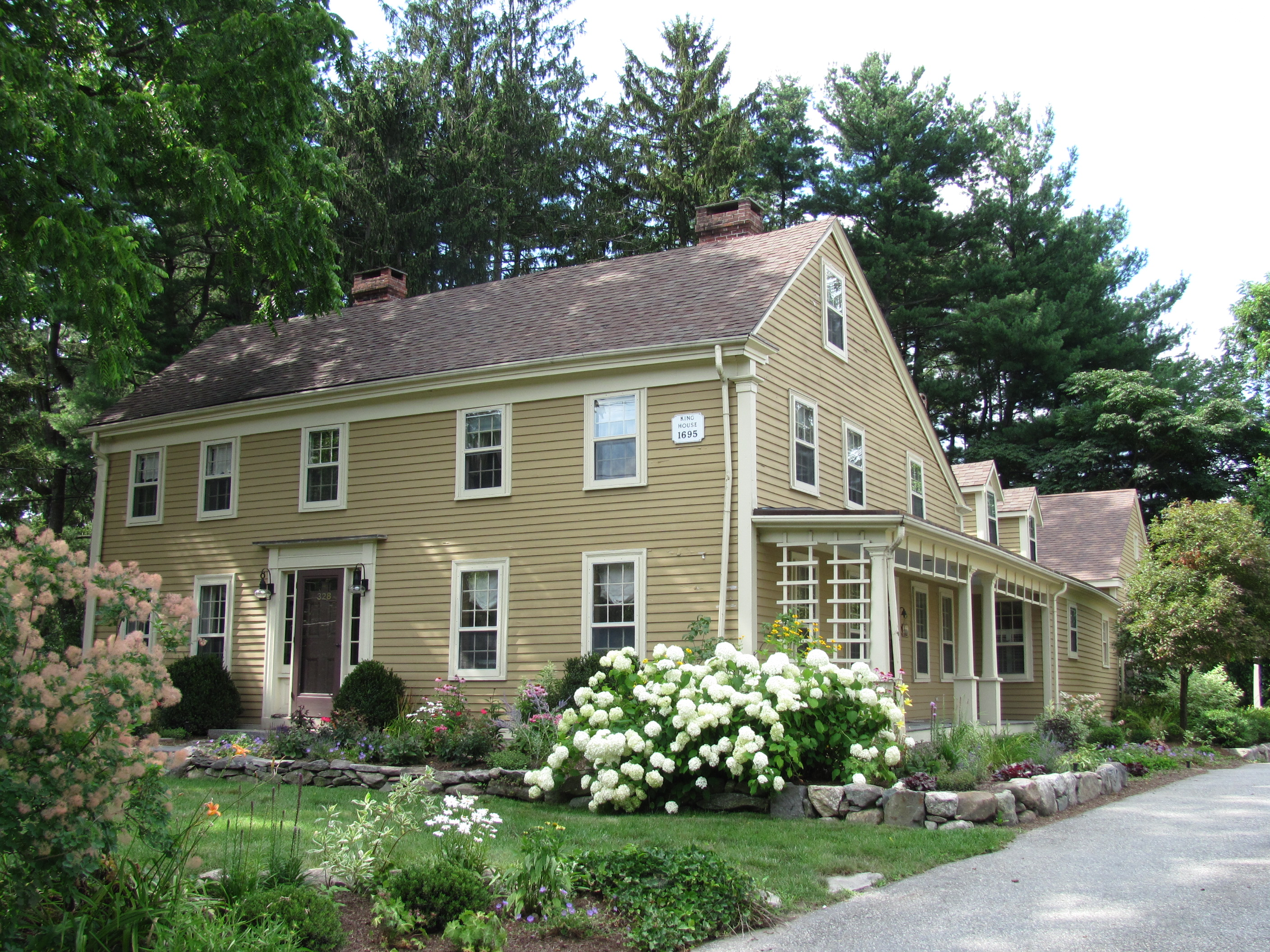
- King House

- Location within Massachusetts Location within the United States
- Location: 328 Brookline St., Newton, Massachusetts
- Coordinates: 42°18′4″N 71°10′47″W
- Built: c.1710
- Architectural style: Georgian
- MPS: Newton MRA
- NRHP reference No.: 86001847
- Added to NRHP: September 04, 1986

The King House is a historic house at 328 Brookline Street in Newton, Massachusetts. This 2 1/2-story timber-frame house was built around 1710, probably by Jonathan Dyke, a cooper, and is one of Newton's few First Period houses, dating to the early period of its settlement. The house was given Greek Revival styling in the 19th century, and is also notable for its association with Noah King, a long-time prominent local doctor. It is five bays wide, with a side gable roof, twin interior chimneys, and clapboard siding. The main entrance has a Greek Revival surround with sidelight windows, wide pilasters, and an entablature. There is a "1695" dated plaque on the house which is the traditional/rumored date.

The house was listed on the National Register of Historic Places in 1986.

== See also ==
- National Register of Historic Places listings in Newton, Massachusetts
