= Stokely Davis House =

Historic house in Tennessee, United States

- Formerly listed on the U.S. National Register of Historic Places
- Location within Tennessee Location within the United States
- Nearest city: Franklin, Tennessee
- Coordinates: 36°0′2″N 86°56′13″W
- Area: 5 acres (2.0 ha)
- Built: 1850
- Architectural style: Italianate, Greek Revival, Central passage plan
- MPS: Williamson County MRA
- NRHP reference No.: 88000294

Significant dates
- Added to NRHP: April 13, 1988
- Removed from NRHP: July 15, 2015

The Stokely Davis House (also known as Fairmount) was built in 1850 and included Italianate architecture and Greek Revival architecture.

The house was among the best two-story vernacular I-house examples in the county (along with William King House, Alpheus Truett House, Claiborne Kinnard House, Beverly Toon House, and Old Town, a.k.a. Thomas Brown House).

It had a two-story portico with Doric columns, and a two-story frame addition to the rear. Its central hall plan interior included Greek Revival-influenced original fireplace mantles with architrave molding and original doors with architrave moldings. Photography was not allowed in the interior, as of its listing.

It was listed on the National Register of Historic Places in 1988.

On the early morning of January 28, 2014, it burned down.

It was removed from the National Register on July 15, 2015.
