= Franklin Hardeman House =

Historic house in Tennessee, United States

- U.S. National Register of Historic Places
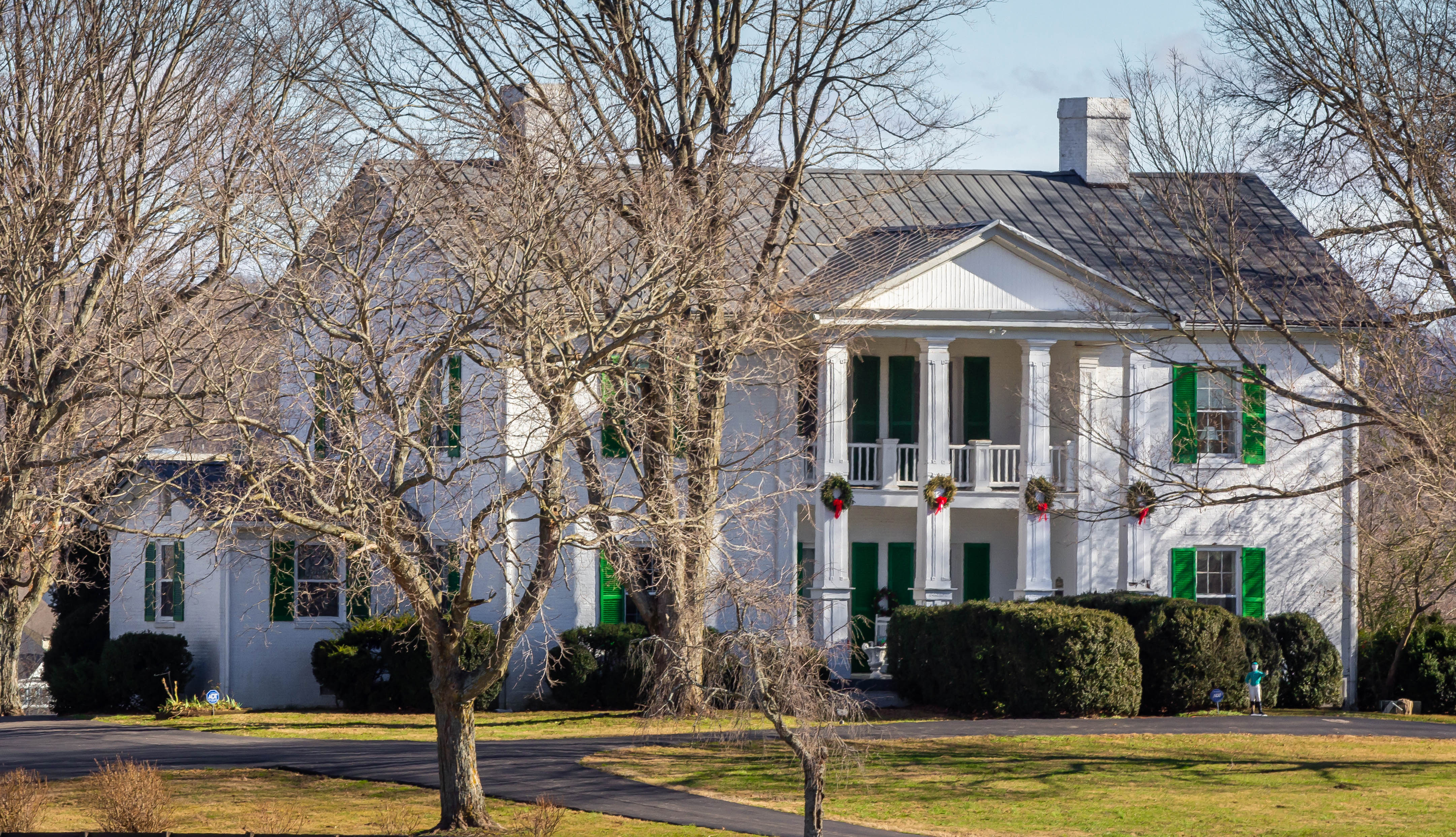
- Franklin Hardeman House

- Location within Tennessee Location within the United States
- Location: Lewisburg Pike 1 mi. S of Goose Creek Bypass, Franklin, Tennessee
- Coordinates: 35°50′46″N 86°50′43″W
- Area: 8.1 acres (3.3 ha)
- Built: c. 1835
- Architectural style: Greek Revival
- MPS: Williamson County MRA
- NRHP reference No.: 88000280
- Added to NRHP: April 13, 1988

The Franklin Hardeman House is a property in Franklin, Tennessee that was listed on the National Register of Historic Places in 1988. The property is also known as Sugar Hill and is denoted as Williamson County historic resource WM-291.

It was built or has other significance as of c.1835. It includes Greek Revival architecture. When listed the property included one contributing building, two non-contributing buildings, and one non-contributing structure, on an area of 8.1 acres (3.3 ha).

The property was covered in a 1988 study of Williamson County historical resources.
