= Beverly Toon House =

Historic house in Tennessee, United States

- U.S. National Register of Historic Places
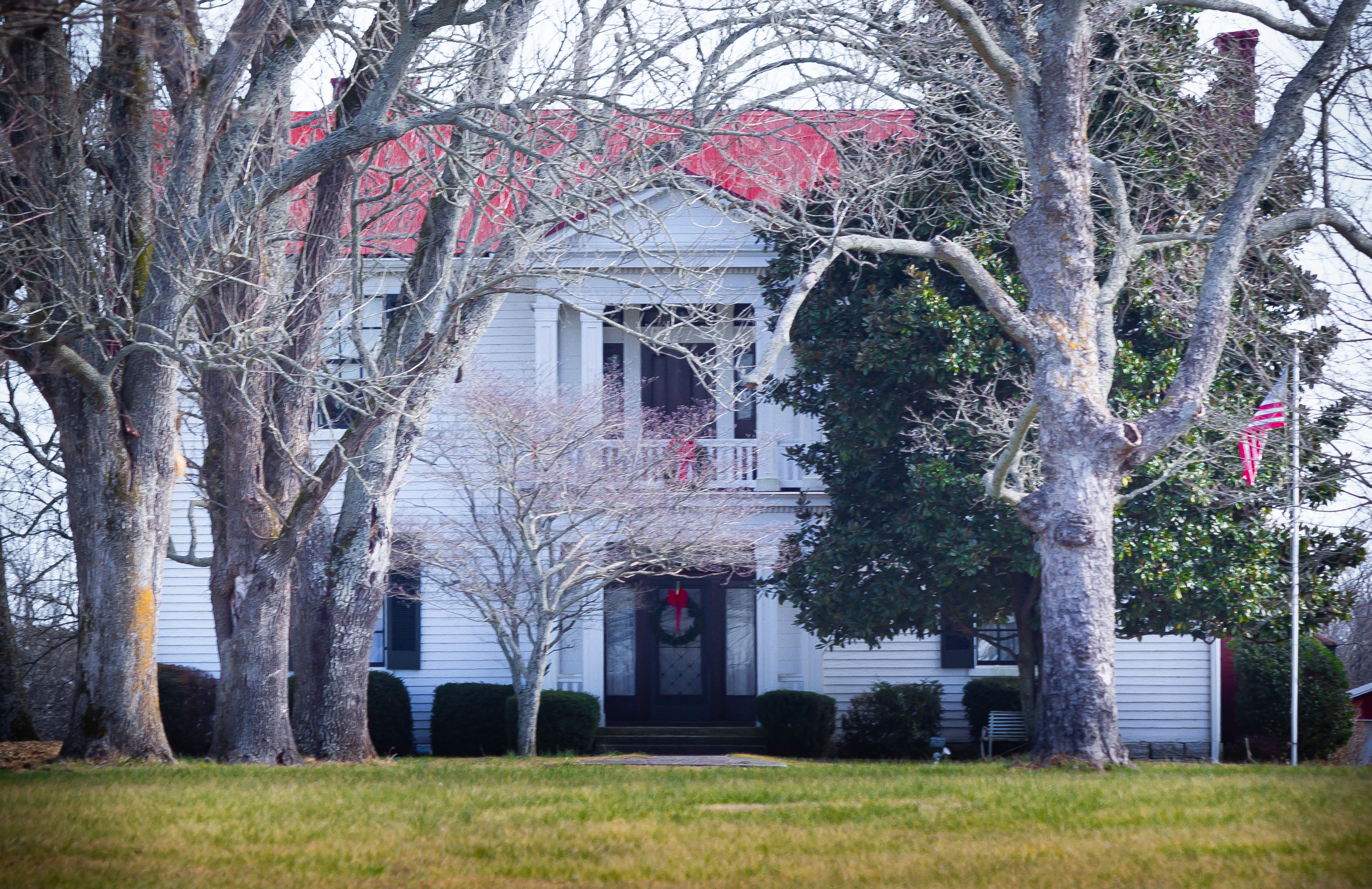
- Beverly Toon House

- Location within Tennessee Location within the United States
- Location: Arno Rd. 1/2 mi. W of Peytonsville Rd., Franklin, Tennessee
- Coordinates: 35.87259°N 86.78859°W
- Area: 1.8 acres (0.73 ha)
- Built: c. 1857 and c. 1900
- Architectural style: Greek Revival, Central passage plan
- MPS: Williamson County MRA
- NRHP reference No.: 88000361
- Added to NRHP: April 14, 1988

The Beverly Toon House is a property in Franklin, Tennessee, United States, that was listed on the National Register of Historic Places in 1988. It has also been known as Riverside. It dates from c. 1857.

A 1988 study of Williamson County historical resources assessed that this house was one of the "best two-story vernacular I-House examples" in the county. The others highly rated were the William King House, the Alpheus Truett House, the Thomas Brown House, the Claiborne Kinnard House, and the Stokely Davis House.
