= William King House (Franklin, Tennessee) =

Historic house in Tennessee, United States

- Formerly listed on the U.S. National Register of Historic Places
- Location: TN 96, 1 1/2 mi. W of US Alt. 41, Franklin, Tennessee
- Area: 1.8 acres (0.73 ha)
- Built: c. 1854
- Architectural style: Greek Revival, Central passage plan
- MPS: Williamson County MRA
- NRHP reference No.: 88000297
- Removed from NRHP: June 14, 1996

William King House, also known as Royal Oak Farm, in Franklin, Tennessee, United States, was listed on the National Register of Historic Places, but was removed from the National Register in 1996.

The two-story wood-frame I house was built circa 1854 and included Central passage plan architecture. The National Register listing included a land area of 1.8 acres (0.73 ha). A 1988 study of Williamson County historical resources assessed that this house was one of the "best two-story vernacular I-House examples" in the county; the others highly rated were the Beverly Toon House, the Alpheus Truett House, the Thomas Brown House, the Claiborne Kinnard House, and the Stokely Davis House.
