= Thomas Brown House (Franklin, Tennessee) =

Historic house in Tennessee, United States

- Old Town
- U.S. National Register of Historic Places
- Location within Tennessee Location within the United States
- Nearest city: Franklin, Tennessee
- Coordinates: 35°59′37″N 86°56′10″W
- Area: 2.8 acres (1.1 ha)
- Built: 1846
- Architect: Lilly, Pryor
- Architectural style: Greek Revival, Central passage plan
- MPS: Williamson County MRA (WM-397)
- NRHP reference No.: 88000324
- Added to NRHP: April 14, 1988

Old Town, also known as the Thomas Brown House, is a house in Franklin, Tennessee, United States, at the Old Town Archeological Site that was built by Thomas Brown starting in 1846. It is a two-story frame structure built on an "I-House" plan, an example of vernacular architecture showing Greek Revival influences. The Thomas Brown House is among the best two-story vernacular I-house examples in the county (along with the William King House, the Alpheus Truett House, the Claiborne Kinnard House, the Beverly Toon House, and the Stokely Davis House).

It was located on the Harpeth River branch of the Natchez Trace.

Singer Jimmy Buffett owned the house in the late 1980s.

It is built amidst and named for, Old Town, a village site of Mississippian culture with mounds. It is located near Old Town Bridge, the remains of a Natchez Trace bridge.

== Original Owner ==
Thomas Brown was born in Virginia in 1800 and moved to Williamson County, Tennessee in 1822. Brown became a prominent farmer and purchased a large amount of land from William O'Neal Perkins in 1840. Brown began construction of this two-story frame house in 1846 with builder Prior Lilly acting as contractor. Little is known about Lilly but he is also the attributed contractor of the H.G.W. Mayberry House (MW-676), a brick central passage plan residence built ca. 1856. Thomas Brown was listed in 1860 with real estate valued at $25,000 and personal property of $34.500. At his death in 1870, he owned 546 acres of valuable land along the Harpeth River. Brown had six children and his daughter, Bethenia Brown Miller, lived at the house until her death in 1913.

== Exterior ==
Old Town is a two-story frame central passage plan antebellum residence with Greek Revival detailing. On the main (east) facade is an original two-story portico with square columns and Doric capitals. On the second story balcony is a lattice railing and in the gable field is dentil molding. The main entrance has an original four panel frame door, two light sidelights with frame lower panels, and a two light transom. Dividing the door and sidelights are fluted Doric motif plasters. The door has rectangular frame panels and a dentilled cornice.

On the central bay of the second story is an original door with features to match the main entrance. Windows on the main facade are original paired four-over-four sash with 19th century shutters. Over the windows are dentiled cornices and dentils are also located along the roof cornice. The house has weatherboard siding, exterior end brick chimneys, a gable roof of composition shingles, and a stone foundation. On the south facade are original four panel doors which open onto a ca. 1960 one-story porch with square Doric motif columns. The rear two-story ell also has a brick chimney. The rear and side facades have original six-over-six sash windows.
