= Green House =

Green House may refer to:

== Buildings ==
=== Hong Kong ===
- 7 Mallory Street, a tenement block formerly known as Green House

=== Malta ===
- The Green House, Sliema

=== Lithuania ===
- The Green House is a Holocaust exhibit at the Vilna Gaon Jewish State Museum

=== United Kingdom ===
- Green House Hotel, England

=== United States ===
- Jacob Green House, Ashville, Alabama, listed on the National Register of Historic Places (NRHP)
- Green House (Little Rock, Arkansas), listed on the NRHP
- Harley E. Green House, Bear, Arkansas, listed on the NRHP
- Green-Rankin-Bembridge House, Long Beach, California
- Green Mansion House (Kenton, Delaware)
- Green Mansion (Newark, Delaware)
- Joseph Green House, Orange Park, Florida
- Mitchell J. Green Plantation, Claxton, Georgia, listed on the NRHP
- Green-Poe House, Macon, Georgia, listed on the NRHP
- Green-Meldrim House, Savannah, Georgia
- John A. Green Estate, Anamosa, Iowa
- William Green House (Rochester, Iowa), listed on the NRHP
- M. B. Green Site, Petersburg, Kentucky, listed on the NRHP
- Green-Lovelace House, Sicily Island, Louisiana, listed on the NRHP
- Jonathan Green House, Stoneham, Massachusetts
- Green House (Wakefield, Massachusetts)
- Capt. William Green House, Wakefield, Massachusetts
- Deacon Daniel Green House, Wakefield, Massachusetts
- Alanson Green Farm House, Goodrich, Michigan, listed on the NRHP
- Garner Wynn Green House, Jackson, Mississippi, listed on the NRHP
- Duff Green House, Vicksburg, Mississippi, listed on the NRHP
- Jesse R. Green Homestead, Trident, Montana, listed on the NRHP
- William Green House (Ewing Township, New Jersey), listed on the NRHP
- Green-Reading House, Ewing Township, New Jersey, listed on the NRHP
- Joseph Green Farmhouse, Duanesburg, New York
- John Green House (Huntington Bay, New York)
- Asahel Green Farm, Middlesex, New York
- Nathan and Clarissa Green House, Oswego, New York
- Herman Green House, Raleigh, North Carolina, listed on the NRHP
- Green-Hartsfield House, Rolesville, North Carolina
- Lucius Green House, Perry, Ohio, listed on the NRHP
- Bertha M. and Marie A. Green House, Portland, Oregon
- Harry A. and Ada Green House, Portland, Oregon
- Green-Evans House, Lynchburg, Tennessee, listed on the NRHP
- Sherwood Green House, Nolensville, Tennessee
- Roland A. D. Green House, Abilene, Texas, listed on the NRHP
- Rufus A. Green House, Bastrop, Texas, listed on the NRHP
- Henry G. and Annie B. Green House, Kendleton, Texas, listed on the NRHP
- James Green House, Bountiful, Utah, listed on the NRHP
- Samuel Green House, Pleasant Grove, Utah
- Alvin and Annie Green House, Sandy, Utah, listed on the NRHP
- Albert and Letha Green House and Barn, Battle Ground, Washington
- August G. and Theresa Green House, Stevens Point, Wisconsin

== Other uses ==
- The Green House, a novel by Mario Vargas Llosa
- Green House Project, an American national non-profit organization
- "The Green House", a season 1 episode of The Loud House
- Green House, a videogame on the Game & Watch in 1982. It also serves as a prequel to Donkey Kong II

== See also ==
- William Green House (disambiguation)
- Greene House (disambiguation)
- Greenhouse (disambiguation)
