= William Green House =

William Green House may refer to:

- William Green House (Rochester, Iowa)
- Capt. William Green House, Wakefield, Massachusetts
- William Green House (Ewing Township, New Jersey)

== See also ==
- Green House (disambiguation)
