= John Green House =

John Green House or John Greene House may refer to:

- John T. Greene House, Sacramento, California, listed on the National Register of Historic Places (NRHP) in Sacramento County, California
- John A. Green Estate, Anamosa, Iowa
- Jonathan Green House, Stoneham, Massachusetts
- John Green House (Huntington Bay, New York)
- John Green House (Nyack, New York), listed on the NRHP in Rockland County
- John Bunyan Green Farm, Midland, North Carolina

== See also ==
- Green House (disambiguation)
- Greene House (disambiguation)
