= John Motheral House =

Historic house in Tennessee, United States

- U.S. National Register of Historic Places
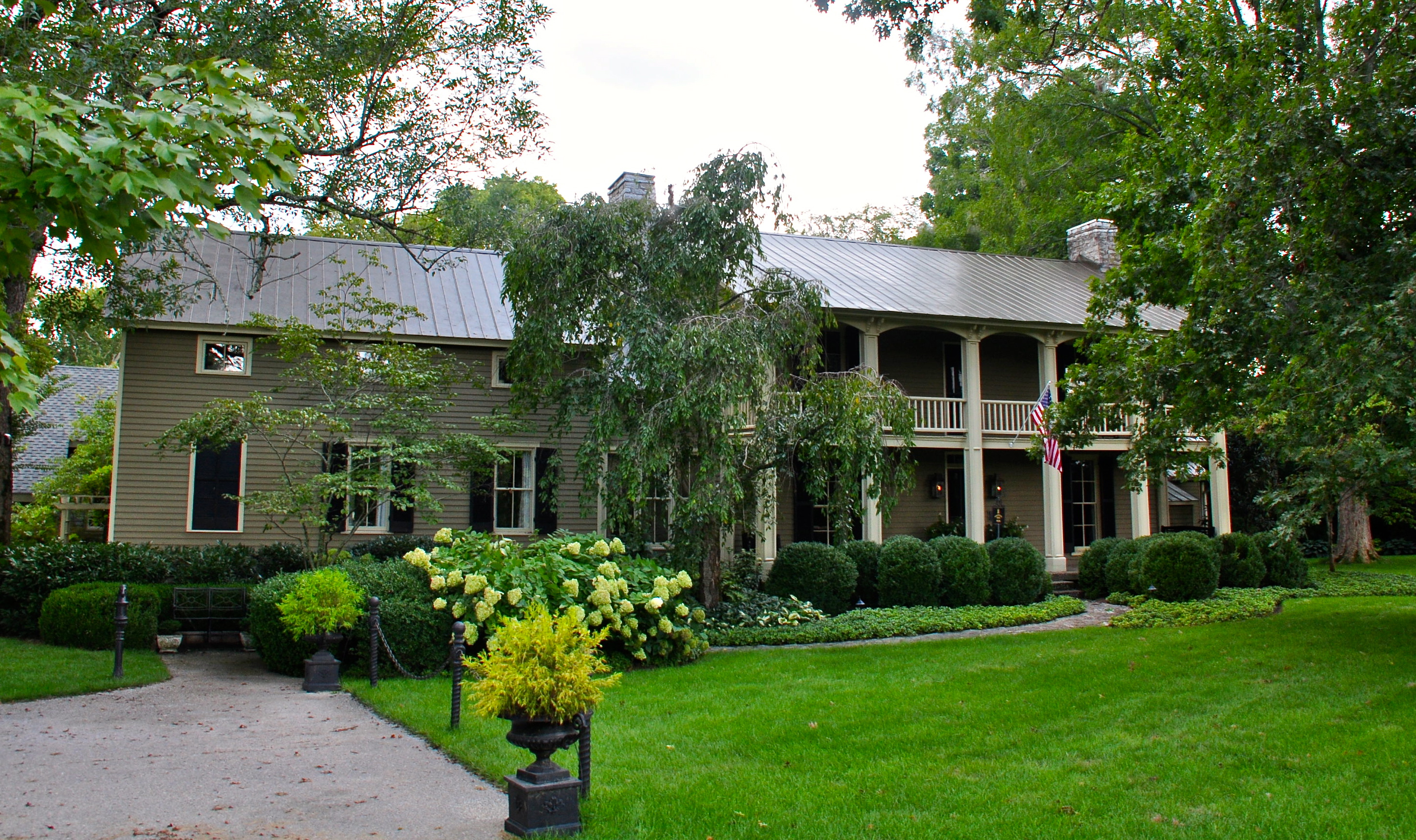
- John Motheral House, September 2014

- Location within Tennessee Location within the United States
- Location: Moran Rd. at Big Harpeth River, Franklin, Tennessee 36°01′01″N 86°53′56″W
- Coordinates: 36°01′01″N 86°53′56″W
- Area: 2 acres (0.81 ha)
- Built: c.1805 and c.1870
- MPS: Williamson County MRA
- NRHP reference No.: 88000339
- Added to NRHP: April 13, 1988

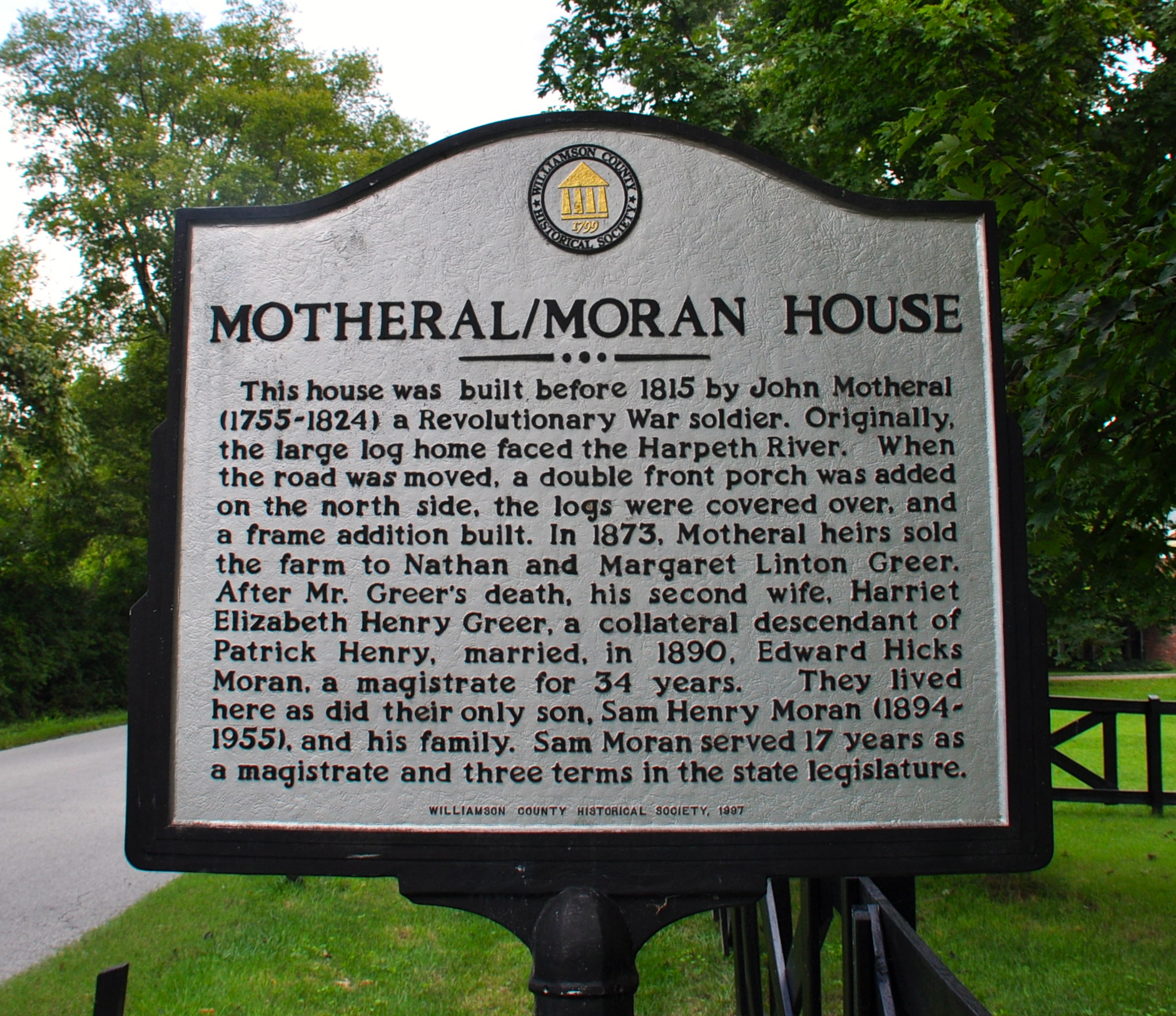
Williamson County Historical Marker for John Motheral House

The John Motheral House is a property in Franklin, Tennessee that dates from c.1805, was enlarged c.1870, and was listed on the National Register of Historic Places in 1988.

It was built as a log building in c.1805, probably of single pen construction, and was enlarged c.1870 to have an "imposing" two story frame construction. Other Williamson County structures that were enlarged in this way, in approximately the same time period, include the Sherwood Green House and the William Leaton House.
