= Sherwood Green House =

Historic house in Tennessee, United States

- U.S. National Register of Historic Places
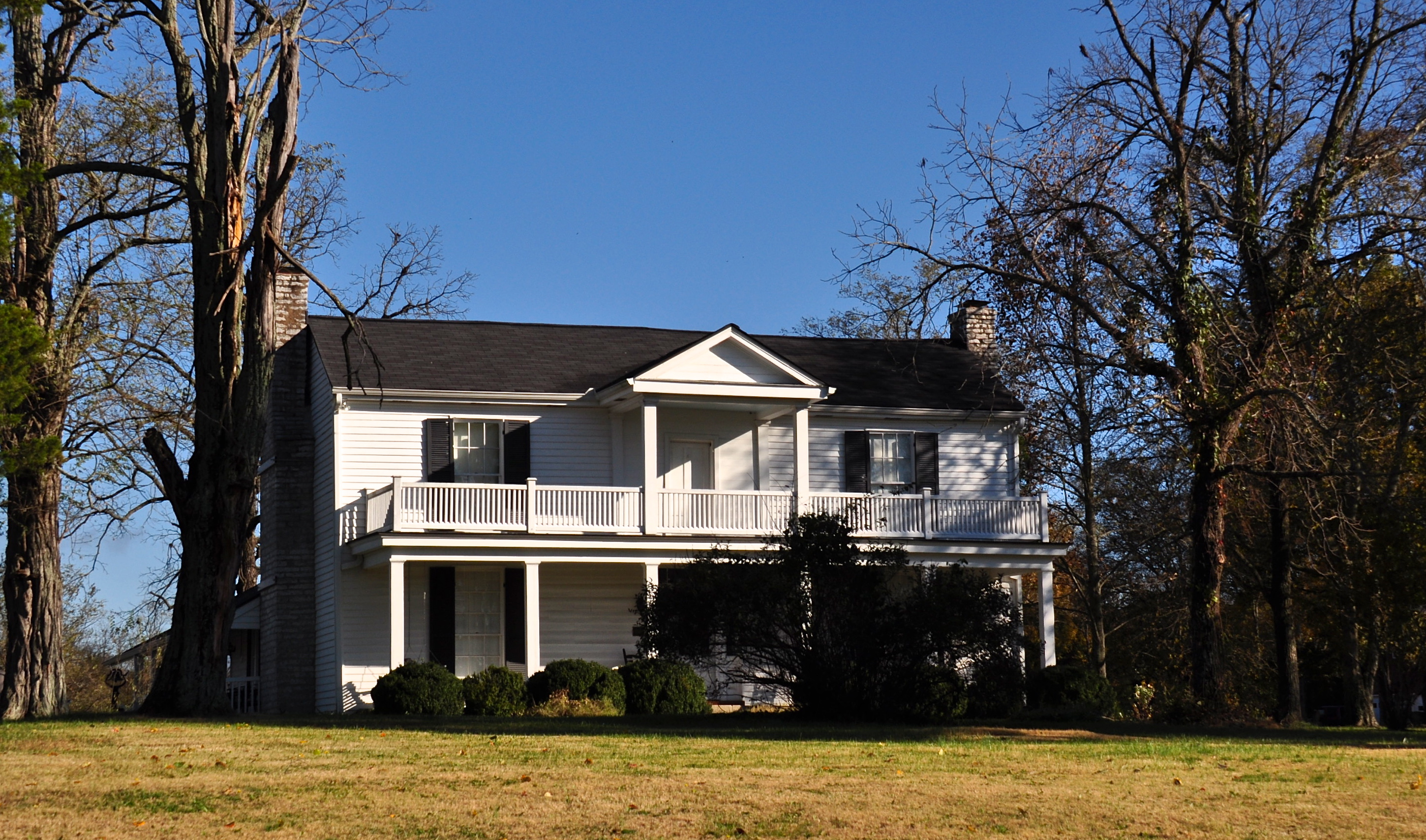
- The Sherwood Green House in November 2013.

- Location within Tennessee Location within the United States
- Location: Rocky Fork Rd. 1/2 mile east of Nolensville, Tennessee
- Coordinates: 35°57′11.87″N 86°39′28.58″W
- Area: 8 acres (3.2 ha)
- Built: c. 1810, c. 1840 and c. 1928
- Architectural style: Central passage plan
- MPS: Williamson County MRA
- NRHP reference No.: 88000311
- Added to NRHP: April 13, 1988

The Sherwood Green House is a property in Williamson County, Tennessee, near Nolensville, that was listed on the National Register of Historic Places in 1988.

It was built c.1810 and had significant developments also in c.1840, and c.1928. It includes Central passage plan and other architecture. When listed, the property included four contributing buildings, one contributing site, and two non-contributing structures, on an area of 8 acres (3.2 ha).

Like the John Motheral House and the William Leaton House (also NRHP-listed in Williamson County), the house was built as a single story log pen building, and was later enlarged to achieve an "imposing" two story frame construction.

The house was expanded and covered with weatherboard in c.1840. A second story porch with square columns was added then. A first-floor one-story porch with square Doric-capital posts was added in 1928.

The interior includes a c.1840 stairway with a square newel post and square balusters, and fireplace mantles having simple Greek Revival design with Doric motif pilasters.

Contributing outbuildings include a log kitchen (c.1840) and a log smokehouse (c.1840), both with half dovetail notching, and a slave house (c.1840) later used as a milk house.

Sherwood Green was a surveyor who was paid in land for his services. Green came to own more than 1,000 acres (400 ha) in the area.
