= Millard–Souther–Green House =

Historic house in Massachusetts, United States

- U.S. National Register of Historic Places
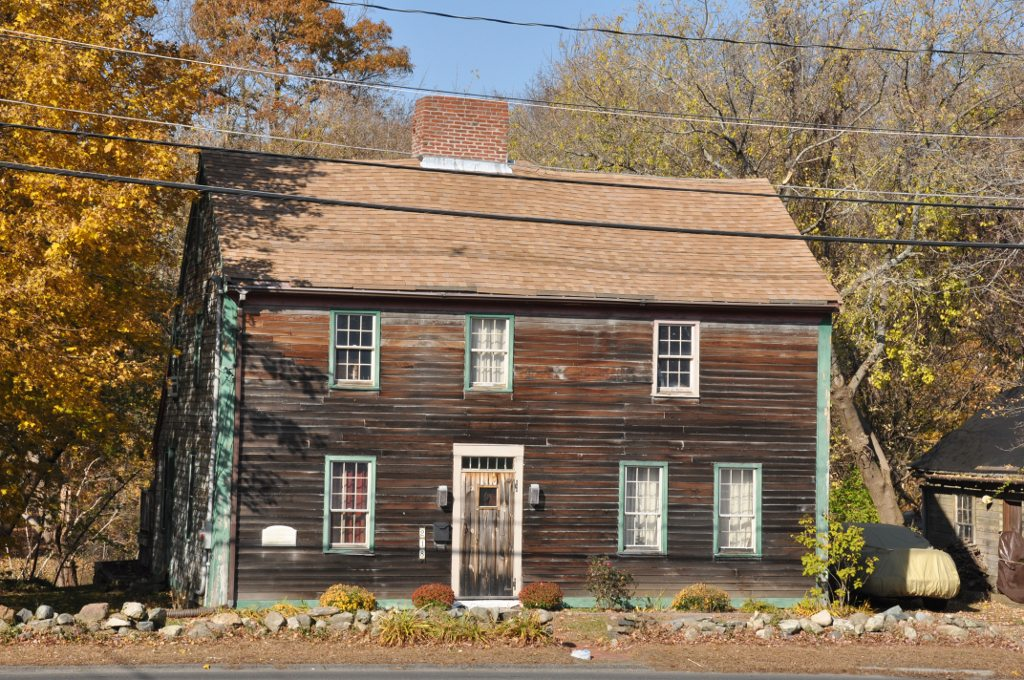

- Location within Massachusetts Location within the United States
- Location: 218 Green St., Stoneham, Massachusetts
- Coordinates: 42°29′14″N 71°5′14″W
- Built: ca. 1700
- Architectural style: Colonial
- MPS: Stoneham MRA
- NRHP reference No.: 84002752
- Added to NRHP: April 13, 1984

The Millard–Souther–Green House is a historic house at 218 Green Street in Stoneham, Massachusetts. Built c. 1700, it is one of the oldest buildings in Stoneham. It is a two-story timber-frame structure with an asymmetrical four-bay facade. The entry is in the second bay from the left, with the slightly off-center large brick chimney behind. It has an added rear leanto section, giving it a classic saltbox profile. The window openings appear to be original in terms of size and position, a rarity for Stoneham's 18th-century houses.

The house was likely built by Thomas Millard, who sold it to the Souther family in 1725. It was later sold into the locally prominent Green family, and has long been a local landmark.

The house was listed on the National Register of Historic Places in 1984.

== See also ==
- Jonathan Green House, c. 1700–1720
- National Register of Historic Places listings in Stoneham, Massachusetts
- National Register of Historic Places listings in Middlesex County, Massachusetts
