= Green Mansion (Newark, Delaware) =

Historic house in Delaware, United States

- U.S. National Register of Historic Places
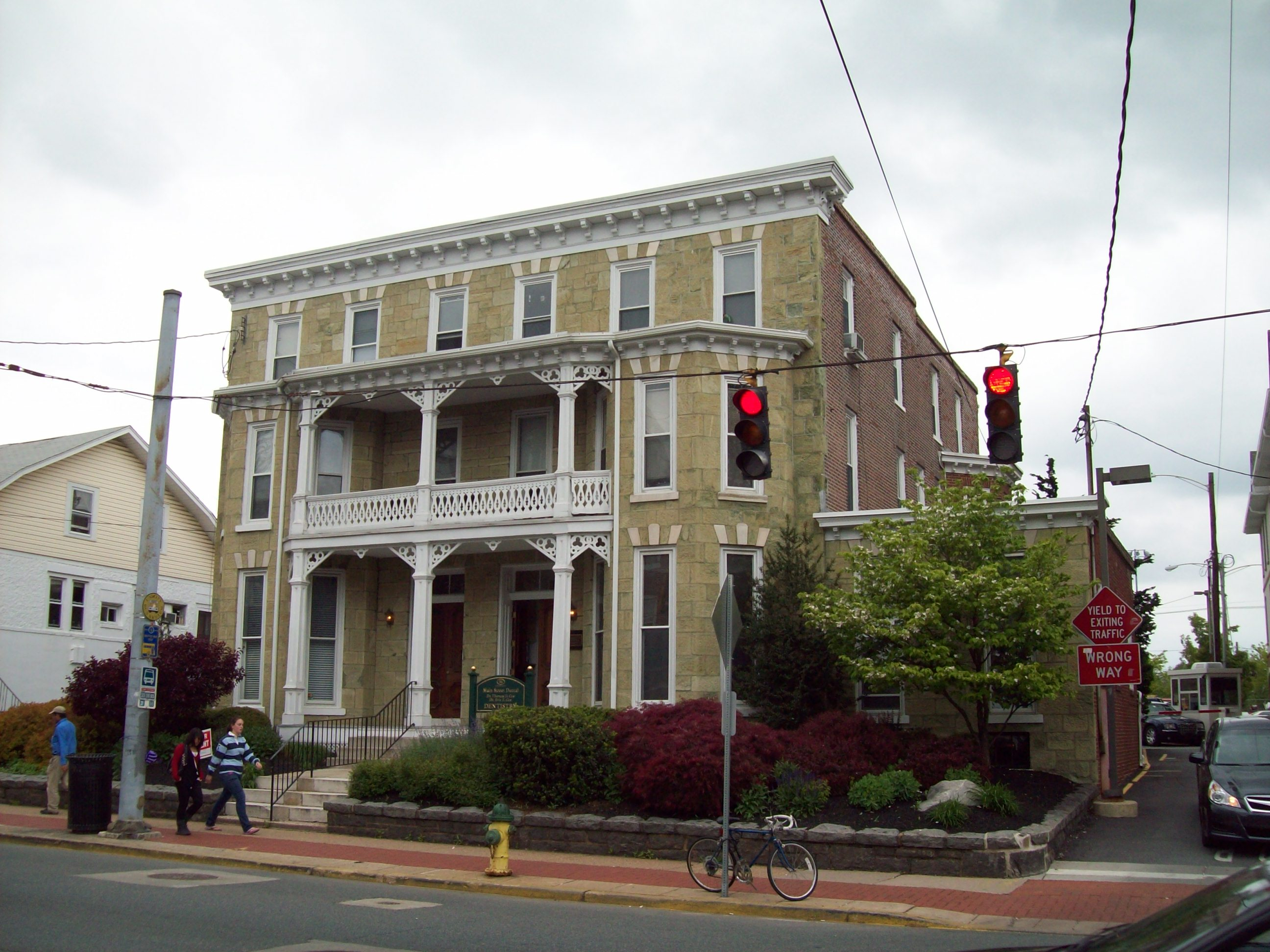
- Green Mansion, April 2010

- Location within Delaware Location within the United States
- Location: 94–96 E. Main St., Newark, Delaware
- Coordinates: 39°41′1″N 75°44′58″W
- Area: 0.7 acres (0.28 ha)
- Built: 1882
- Architectural style: Late Victorian
- MPS: Newark MRA
- NRHP reference No.: 83001395
- Added to NRHP: February 24, 1983

Green Mansion is a historic home and later commercial building located at Newark in New Castle County, Delaware. It was built about 1882 and is an oblong, three-story, brick building with a flat roofline. It features a green serpentine facade with a two-story bay window at each end, joined in the center by an ornate two-tiered porch featuring paneled columns. It was originally built as a two-story residence and expanded in the early 20th century when it began being used for commercial purposes.

It was added to the National Register of Historic Places in 1983.

In 2019, the Newark City Council approved a controversial plan to build a seven-story Hyatt Place hotel on the site of the Green Mansion. The rear of the mansion was demolished, while the front is planned to be incorporated into the new hotel. The project was delayed and scaled back due to the COVID-19 pandemic, but construction began around the beginning of 2022.

== See also ==
- National Register of Historic Places listings in Newark, Delaware
