= Green House (Little Rock, Arkansas) =

Historic house in Arkansas, United States

- U.S. National Register of Historic Places
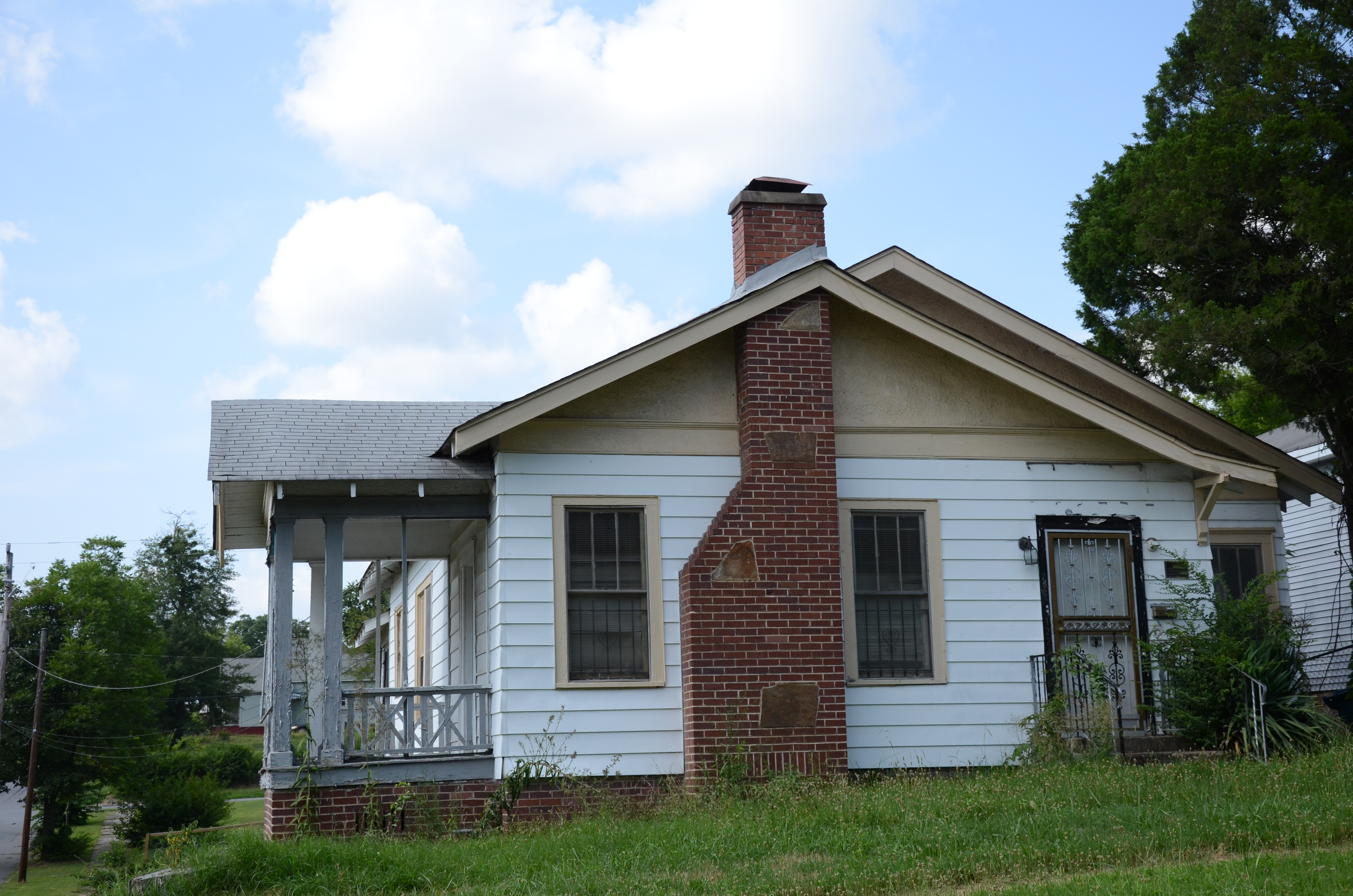

- Location within Arkansas Location within the United States
- Location: 1224 W. 21st St., Little Rock, Arkansas
- Coordinates: 34°43′45″N 92°17′16″W
- Area: less than one acre
- Built: 1957
- Architectural style: Bungalow/craftsman
- MPS: Historically Black Properties in Little Rock's Dunbar School Neighborhood MPS
- NRHP reference No.: 99000544
- Added to NRHP: May 28, 1999

The Green House is a historic house at 1224 West 21st Street in Little Rock, Arkansas. It is a single-story wood-frame structure, with front-facing gable roof and weatherboard siding. A section with a smaller gable projects forward, and the main entrance on the left side, under a projecting gable. All gables have exposed rafter ends in the Craftsman style. It was built in 1916, and was from the 1930s home to the Ernest Green family, whose son Ernest, Jr. was the first African-American student to graduate from Little Rock Central High School.

The house was listed on the National Register of Historic Places in 1999.

== See also ==
- National Register of Historic Places listings in Little Rock, Arkansas
