= Samuel Green House =

Historic house in Utah, United States

- U.S. National Register of Historic Places
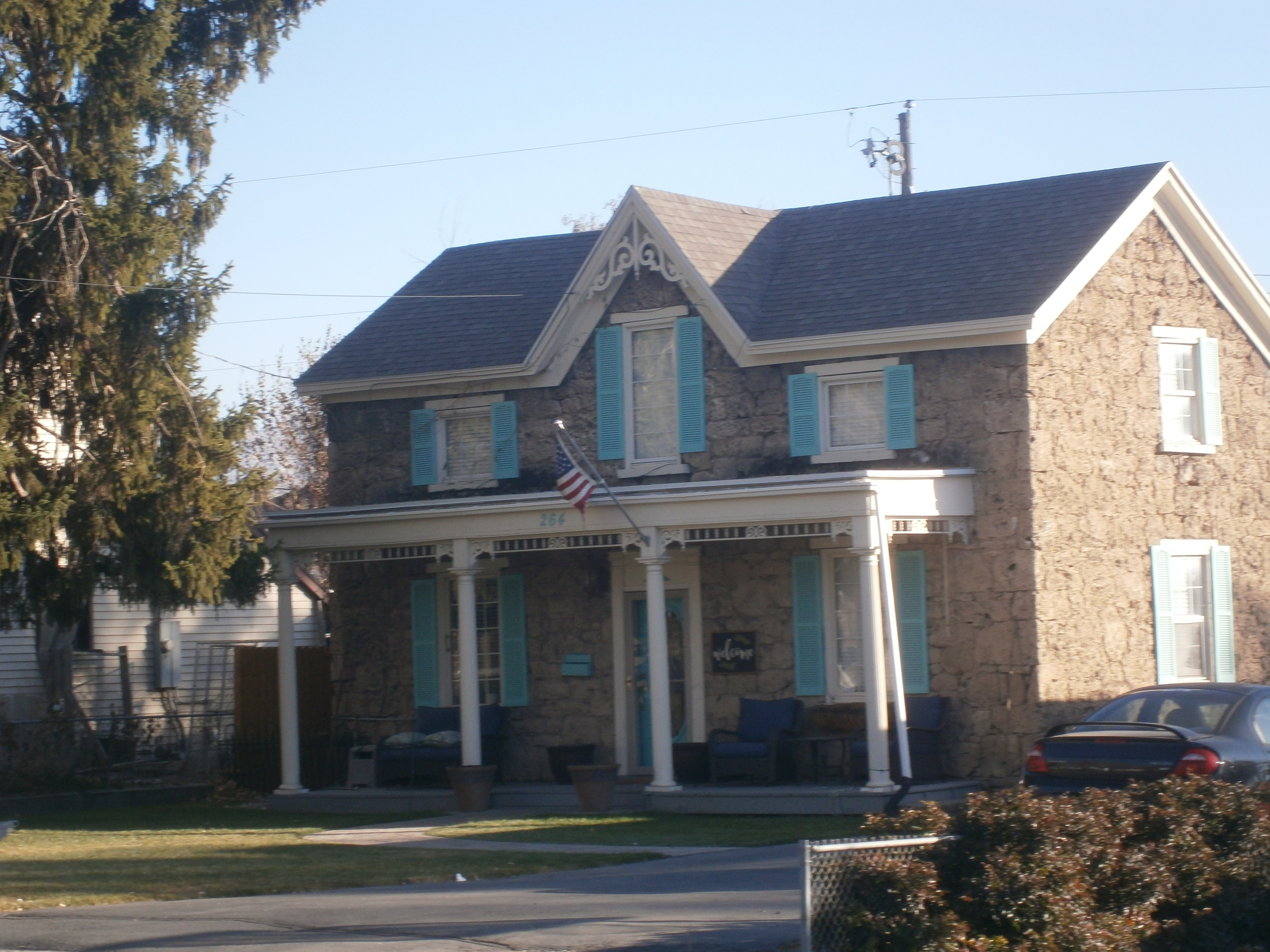

- Location within Utah Location within the United States
- Location: 264 East 200 South, Pleasant Grove, Utah
- Coordinates: 40°21′40″N 111°44′7″W
- Area: 0.3 acres (0.12 ha)
- Built: c. 1870
- MPS: Pleasant Grove Soft-Rock Buildings TR
- NRHP reference No.: 87000827
- Added to NRHP: June 9, 1987

The Samuel Green House is a historic house located at 264 East 200 South in Pleasant Grove, Utah.

== Description and history ==
It is "a two-story soft-rock vernacular house with a hall-parlor plan and a gable roof," built in about 1870. The house has a symmetrical three-bay facade with a central door flanked by 6/6 double-hung windows. It has a front porch that was added on in 1985, which was the only visible alteration to the house at the time of its designation as a landmark.

It was built with a doorway on the second level, which would have led out onto a second story porch, which never happened.

It was home of Samuel Green and his wife Pamelo Wishaw. Samuel was 21 in 1852 when he immigrated from England with his father, William Henry Green. Samuel and Pamelo married in 1858, and had sixteen children, including twins twice, although only half grew to maturity. They build this soft-rock house around 1870, near the southeast corner of the wall of Pleasant Grove's former, abandoned fort.

It was listed on the National Register of Historic Places in 1987. It was part of a study of Pleasant Grove-area buildings built of soft-rock, 13 of which were nominated for listing.
