= Alanson Green Farm House =

- U.S. National Register of Historic Places
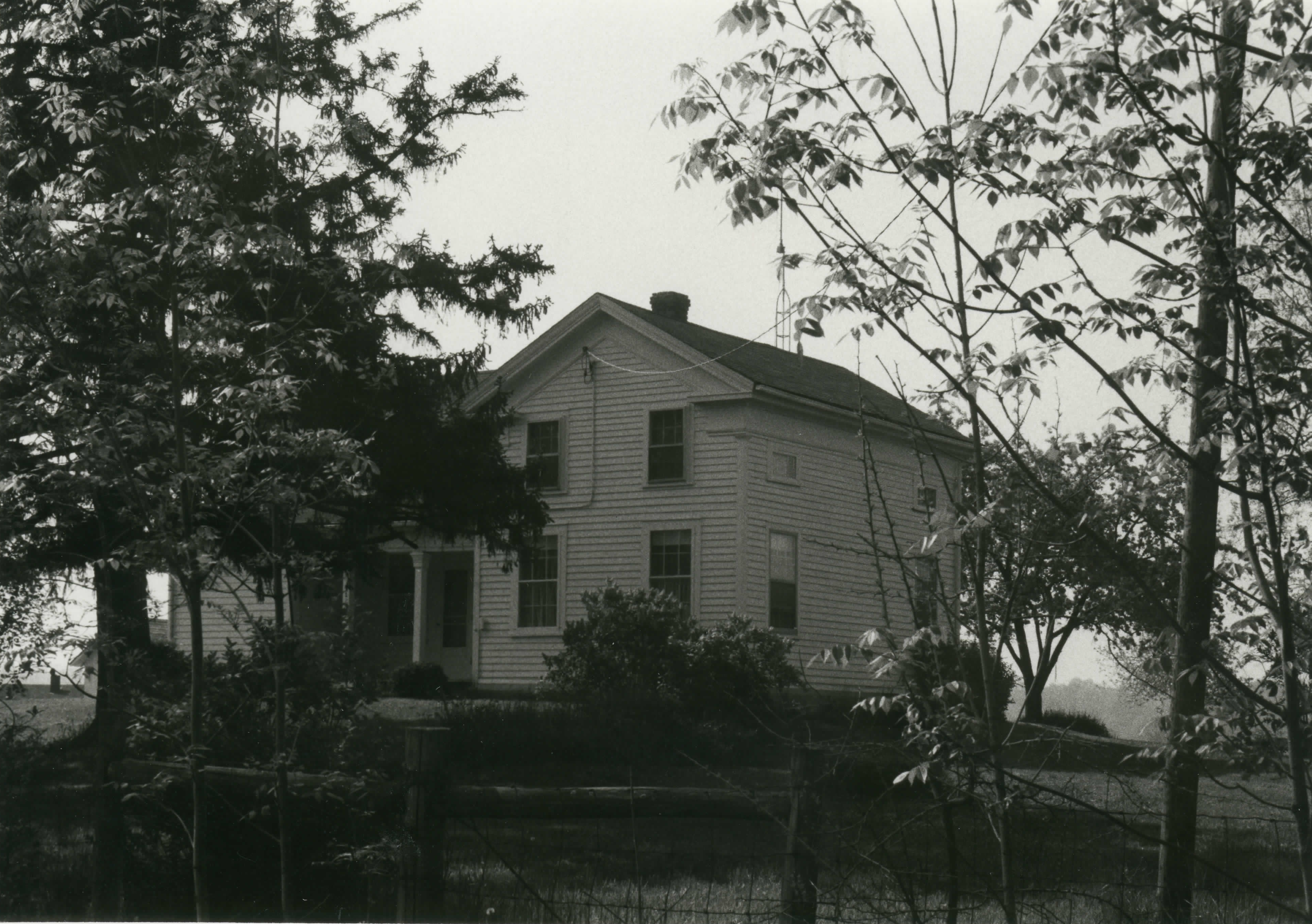
- Interactive map
- Location: 11226 Green Rd., Goodrich, Michigan
- Coordinates: 42°54′15″N 83°29′07″W
- Area: less than one acre
- Built: c. 1855
- Architectural style: Greek Revival
- MPS: Genesee County MRA
- NRHP reference No.: 82000510
- Added to NRHP: November 26, 1982

The Alanson Green Farm House is a single-family home located at 11226 Green Road in Goodrich, Michigan. It was listed on the National Register of Historic Places in 1982. The house is a significant example of Midwestern rural Greek Revival architecture.

== History ==
Alanson Green arrived in Michigan in 1855 after living in New York and Boston. He purchased 100 acres of land and soon after constructed this house. Little more is known about him.

== Description ==
The Alanson Green Farm House is an L-shaped, vernacular Greek Revival house. The ell is fronted with a modest recessed porch with classically-inspired columns which shelters the main door. The house is topped with a wide frieze located below a boxed cornice with returns.
