= Joseph Green Farmhouse =

Historic house in New York, United States

- U.S. National Register of Historic Places
- Location within New York Location within the United States
- Location: NY 159, Duanesburg, New York
- Coordinates: 42°49′43″N 74°10′43″W
- Area: 29.9 acres (12.1 ha)
- Built: 1857
- Architectural style: Greek Revival, Vernacular Greek Revival
- MPS: Duanesburg MRA
- NRHP reference No.: 84003209
- Added to NRHP: October 11, 1984

Joseph Green Farmhouse is a historic home located at Duanesburg in Schenectady County, New York. It was built about 1857 and is a two-story, three bay frame dwelling with clapboard siding in a vernacular Greek Revival style. There is a one-story rear wing. The house has a gable roof with prominent cornice returns and a wide frieze, and broad corner pilasters. Also on the property are two contributing barns, a garage, and shed.

The property was covered in a 1984 study of Duanesburg historical resources. It was listed on the National Register of Historic Places in 1984.
