= Herman Green House =

Historic house in North Carolina, United States

- U.S. National Register of Historic Places
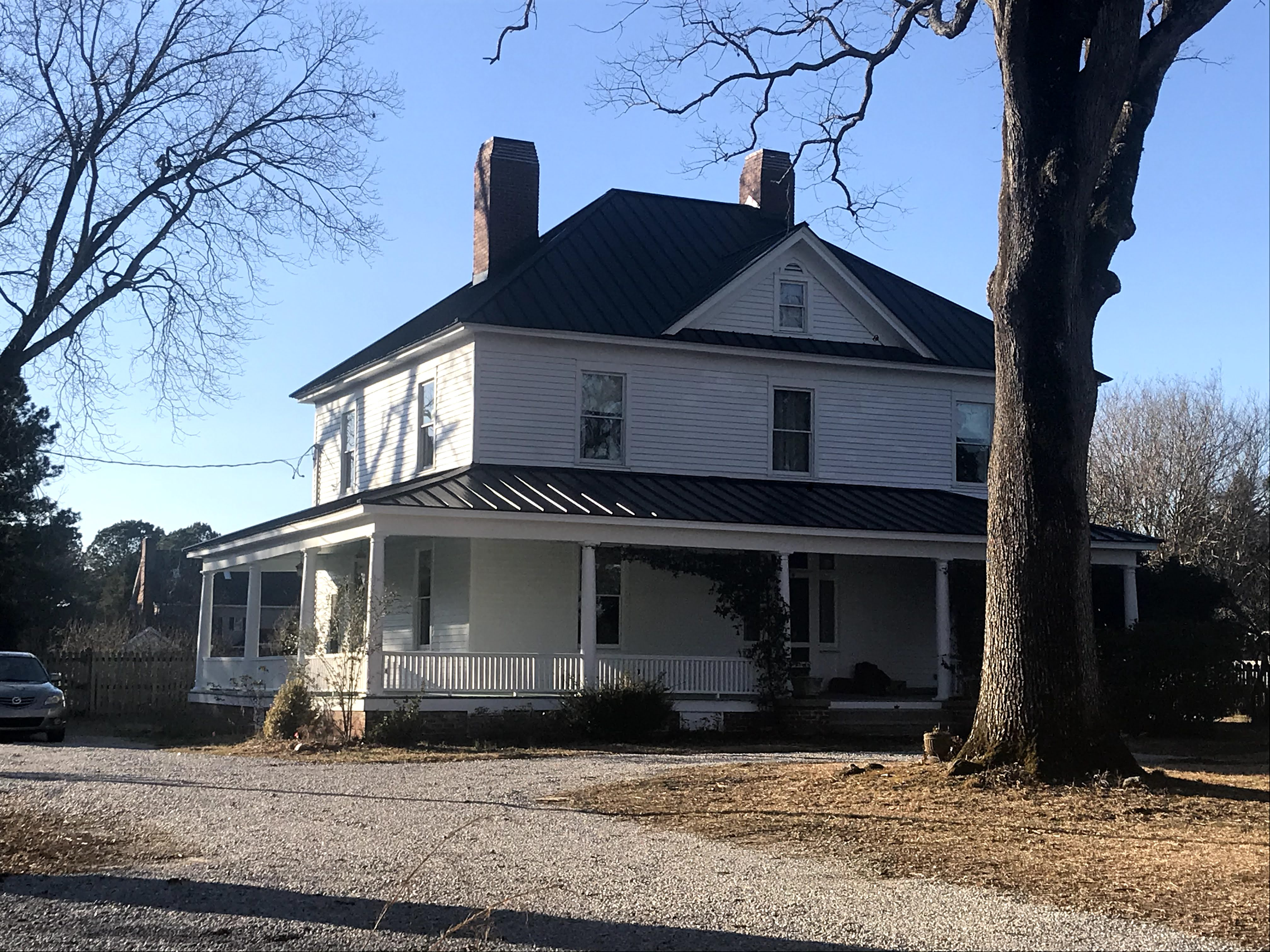

- Location within North Carolina Location within the United States
- Location: 5500 Lake Wheeler Road, Raleigh, North Carolina
- Coordinates: 35°42′27.53″N 78°41′20.58″W
- Area: 1.8 acres (0.73 ha)
- Built: c. 1911
- Architectural style: Colonial Revival
- MPS: Wake County MPS
- NRHP reference No.: 03000930
- Added to NRHP: September 11, 2003

Herman Green House is a historic home located south of Raleigh in Wake County, North Carolina. It was built about 1911, and is a two-story, three-bay, Colonial Revival-style frame dwelling with a slate hipped roof. It is sheathed in weatherboard and has a one-story rear kitchen ell. It features a one-story, hip roof wraparound porch.

It was listed on the National Register of Historic Places in 2003.
