= Harley E. Green House =

Historic house in Arkansas, United States

- U.S. National Register of Historic Places
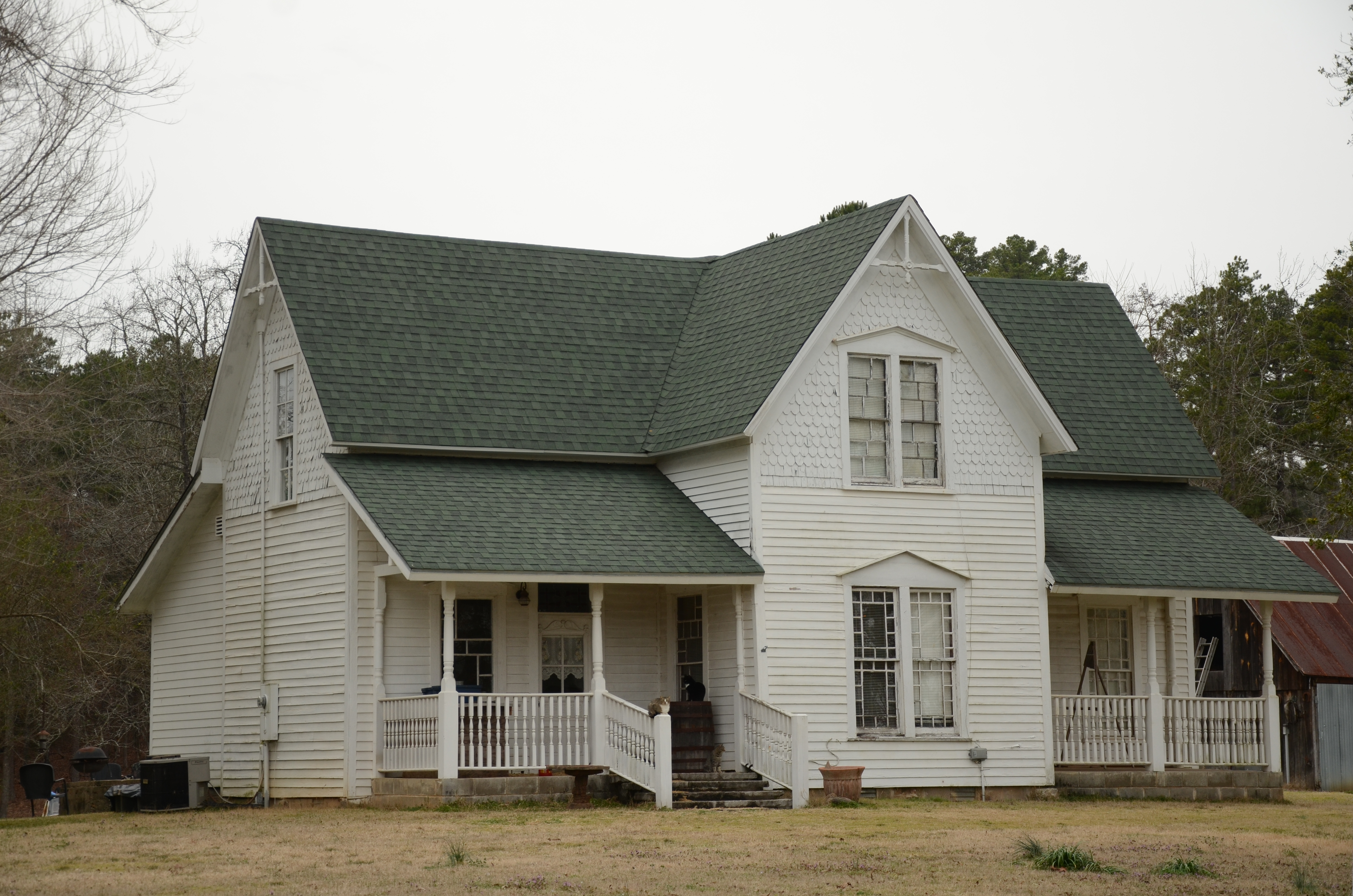

- Location within Arkansas Location within the United States
- Nearest city: Bear, Arkansas
- Coordinates: 34°32′17″N 93°16′29″W
- Area: 1 acre (0.40 ha)
- Built: 1885
- Built by: Harley E. Green
- Architectural style: Stick/eastlake
- NRHP reference No.: 79000439
- Added to NRHP: July 19, 1979

The Harley E. Green House is a historic house on Arkansas Highway 926, just north of Bear, Arkansas. It is a 2 1/2-story wood-frame structure, built in a cross-gable configuration with shed-roof sections in the corners of the cross. Some of these corner sections are enclosed, adding to the mass of the interior, while others shelter porches. The exterior and interior of the house both exhibit the detailed woodwork typical of the Stick/Eastlake style. The house was built in 1888 by Harley Green, a local woodworker, during Bear's brief boom period as a gold and silver mining town. Of more than fifty houses estimated to have been built by him, it is one of only four to survive.

The house was listed on the National Register of Historic Places in 1979.

== See also ==
- National Register of Historic Places listings in Garland County, Arkansas
