= Green-Hartsfield House =

Historic house in North Carolina, United States

- U.S. National Register of Historic Places
- Location within North Carolina Location within the United States
- Location: SR 2303 at jct. with SR 2304, near Rolesville, North Carolina
- Coordinates: 35°55′2″N 78°22′57″W
- Area: 1 acre (0.40 ha)
- Built: 1805
- Architectural style: Georgian, Federal
- NRHP reference No.: 89002158
- Added to NRHP: December 21, 1989

The Green-Hartsfield House, also known as the Hartsfield House, is a historic home located near Rolesville, Wake County, North Carolina, a satellite town northeast of the state capital Raleigh. Built in 1805, the house is an example of Late Georgian / Early Federal style architecture. It is a two-story, three-bay, single pile, frame dwelling sheathed in weatherboard, with a two-story gable-roofed rear ell. A one-story rear shed addition was added in the 1940s. The house was restored between 1985 and 1987. Also on the property is a contributing frame barn.

In December 1989, the Green-Hartsfield House was listed on the National Register of Historic Places.

== See also ==
- List of Registered Historic Places in North Carolina
