= Alvin and Annie Green House =

- U.S. National Register of Historic Places
- The Green House in 2026

- Location within Utah Location within the United States
- Location: 8400 Danish Rd., Cottonwood Heights, Utah
- Coordinates: 40°35′55″N 111°48′04″W
- Area: 2 acres (0.81 ha)
- Built: c. 1910
- Built by: Alvin Green
- Architectural style: Late Victorian, Crosswing
- MPS: Sandy City MPS
- NRHP reference No.: 00000356
- Added to NRHP: April 6, 2000

The Alvin and Annie Green House, at 8400 Danish Rd. in what is now Cottonwood Heights, Utah, was built sometime in the period 1905 to 1915. It was listed on the National Register of Historic Places in 2000.

It is a one-and-one-half-story cross wing house, and has Victorian-eclectic detailing. Built by Alvin Green, it originally had five rooms: a living room, a kitchen and three bedrooms. Its exterior is rock-faced concrete blocks laid in running bond. Alvin Green was born in 1877 in Butler, Utah; Annie was born in 1878 of Danish parents; they married in 1900.

It was located in the "Danish Town" area, in or near Sandy, Utah, in an area which was incorporated in 2005 as Cottonwood Heights, Utah.

It was deemed significant "as the only house remaining in the Danish Town area that was constructed prior to 1937. It is also the only known house in Sandy constructed of rockfaced concrete block, a building material that was popular during the first few decades of the twentieth century. The house also is the only one south of Creek Road that is still owned by a descendant of the original settler of the Danish Town area, and was certainly the most substantial one from the era."

There is a contributing structure which also was included in the listing, which may be a cistern.
