= August G. and Theresa Green House =

Historic house in Wisconsin, United States

- U.S. National Register of Historic Places
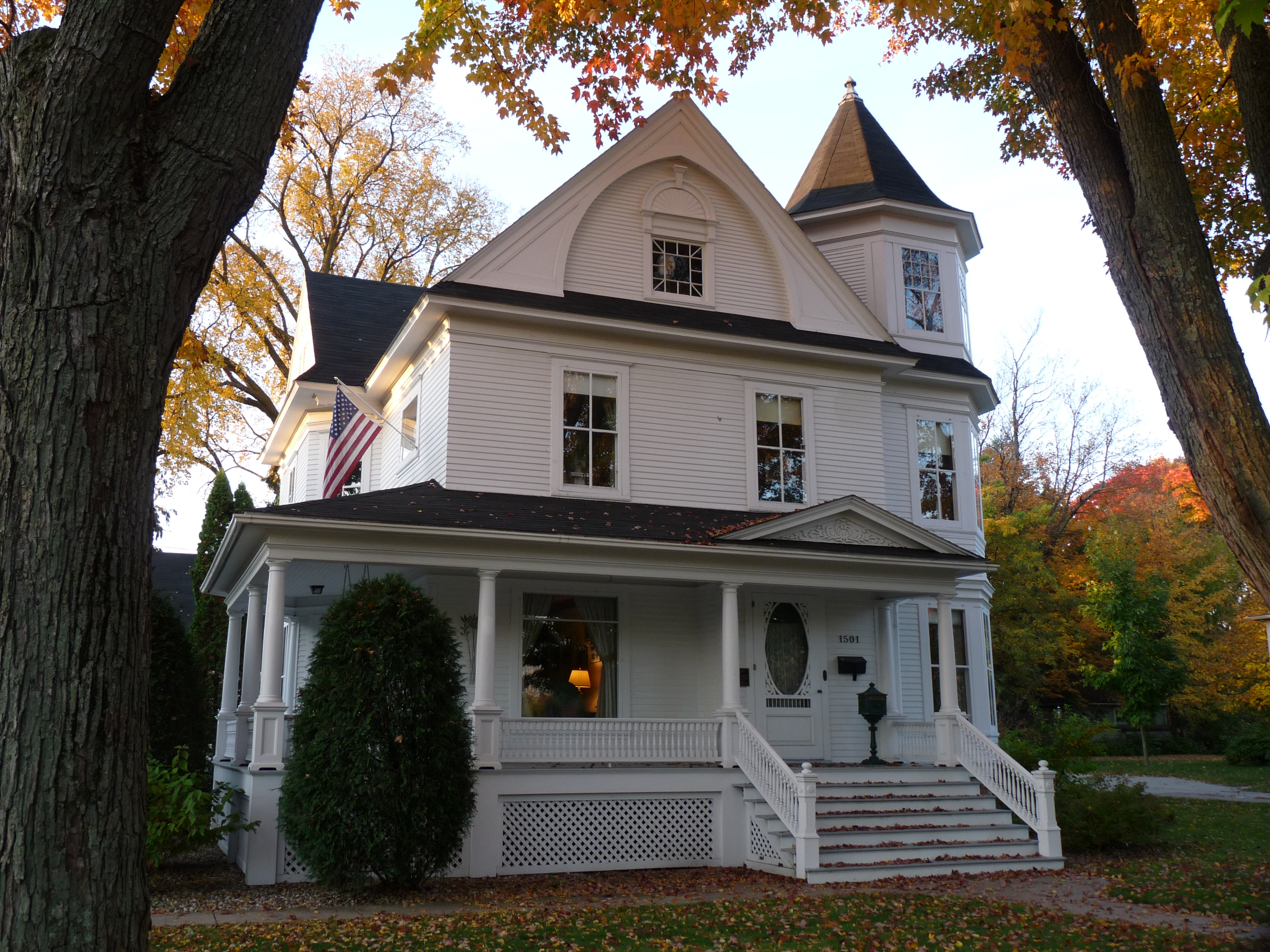

- Location within Wisconsin Location within the United States
- Location: 1501 Main Street, Stevens Point, Wisconsin
- Coordinates: 44°31′24″N 89°34′38″W
- Area: less than one acre
- Built: 1903
- Architect: J. H. Jeffers
- Architectural style: Queen Anne
- NRHP reference No.: 05000533
- Added to NRHP: June 1, 2005

The August G. and Theresa Green House is a historic house located at 1501 Main Street in Stevens Point, Wisconsin, USA.

== Description and history ==
The house is designed in the Queen Anne style, as exhibited by its steep, irregularly shaped roof, its wide porch with classical columns, and its conical corner tower. It was added to the National Register of Historic Places on June 1, 2005.
