= Deacon Daniel Green House =

Historic house in Massachusetts, United States

- U.S. National Register of Historic Places
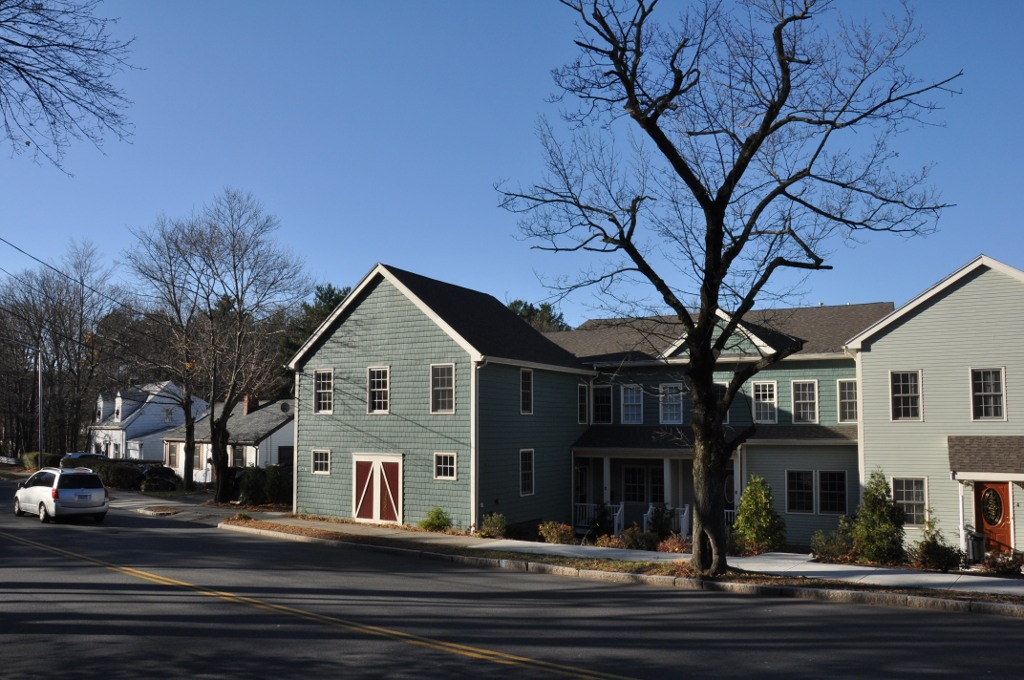

- Location within Massachusetts Location within the United States
- Location: 747 Main St., Wakefield, Massachusetts
- Coordinates: 42°29′29″N 71°4′10″W
- Architectural style: Federal
- MPS: Wakefield MRA
- NRHP reference No.: 89000706
- Added to NRHP: July 06, 1989

The Deacon Daniel Green House is a historic house at 747 Main Street in Wakefield, Massachusetts. It is a 2 1/2-story wood-frame house, with a gable roof and clapboard siding. It was built early in the Federal period (1750–1785), and is one of a few surviving examples of a local architectural variant, three bays wide and four bays deep. The house was occupied by Deacon Daniel Green in 1785, who moved to South Reading (as Wakefield was then known), from Stoneham.

The house was listed on the National Register of Historic Places in 1989.

== See also ==
- National Register of Historic Places listings in Wakefield, Massachusetts
- National Register of Historic Places listings in Middlesex County, Massachusetts
