= Capt. William Green House =

Historic house in Massachusetts, United States

- U.S. National Register of Historic Places
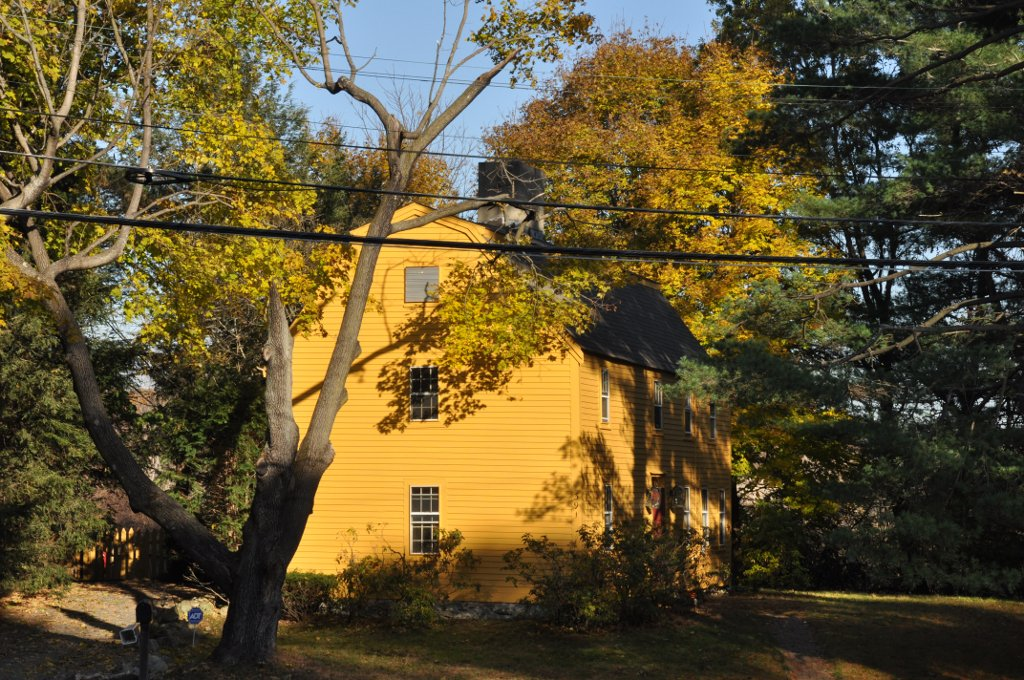

- Location within Massachusetts Location within the United States
- Location: Wakefield, Massachusetts
- Coordinates: 42°31′23.66″N 71°3′53.04″W
- Built: 1680
- Architectural style: Colonial
- MPS: Wakefield MRA, First Period Buildings of Eastern Massachusetts TR
- NRHP reference No.: 89000672 (Wakefield MRA),90000185 (First Period Buildings)
- Added to NRHP: July 6, 1989

The Capt. William Green House (or just the Green House) is a historic colonial house at 391 Vernon Street in Wakefield, Massachusetts. It is one of Wakefield's oldest surviving buildings. The house was listed on the National Register of Historic Places as part of two separate listings. In 1989 it was listed under the name "Capt. William Green House", and in 1990 it was listed under the name "Green House".

== Description and history ==
The Green House is located on the east side of Vernon Street, in northern Wakefield near its border with Lynnfield. The house occupies a narrow parcel of land opposite Juniper Avenue that extends down to the Saugus River, which defines the border between the two towns. The house is a 2 1/2-story wood-frame structure, with a gambrel roof and clapboard siding. Its facade, oriented to face roughly south, is four irregularly spaced bays wide with the entrance in the second bay from the left, which is roughly centered on the facade. A large chimney rises from the center of the roofline behind the entrance. A modern kitchen ell and porch are located to the east and behind the main block.

The oldest portion of this house is a "single-cell" three-bay structure, encompassing the eastern three bays of the main block. This structure is estimated to have been built about 1680 in Lynnfield, and was moved to this area about 1750 by William Green, who expanded the structure. His son Caleb moved it to its present location in 1790. The Green family lands originally included 30 acres (12 ha) on the west side of what is now Jordan Street, and 10 acres (4.0 ha) on the east side.

== See also ==
- National Register of Historic Places listings in Wakefield, Massachusetts
- National Register of Historic Places listings in Middlesex County, Massachusetts
