= William Green House (Ewing Township, New Jersey) =

- U.S. National Register of Historic Places
- New Jersey Register of Historic Places
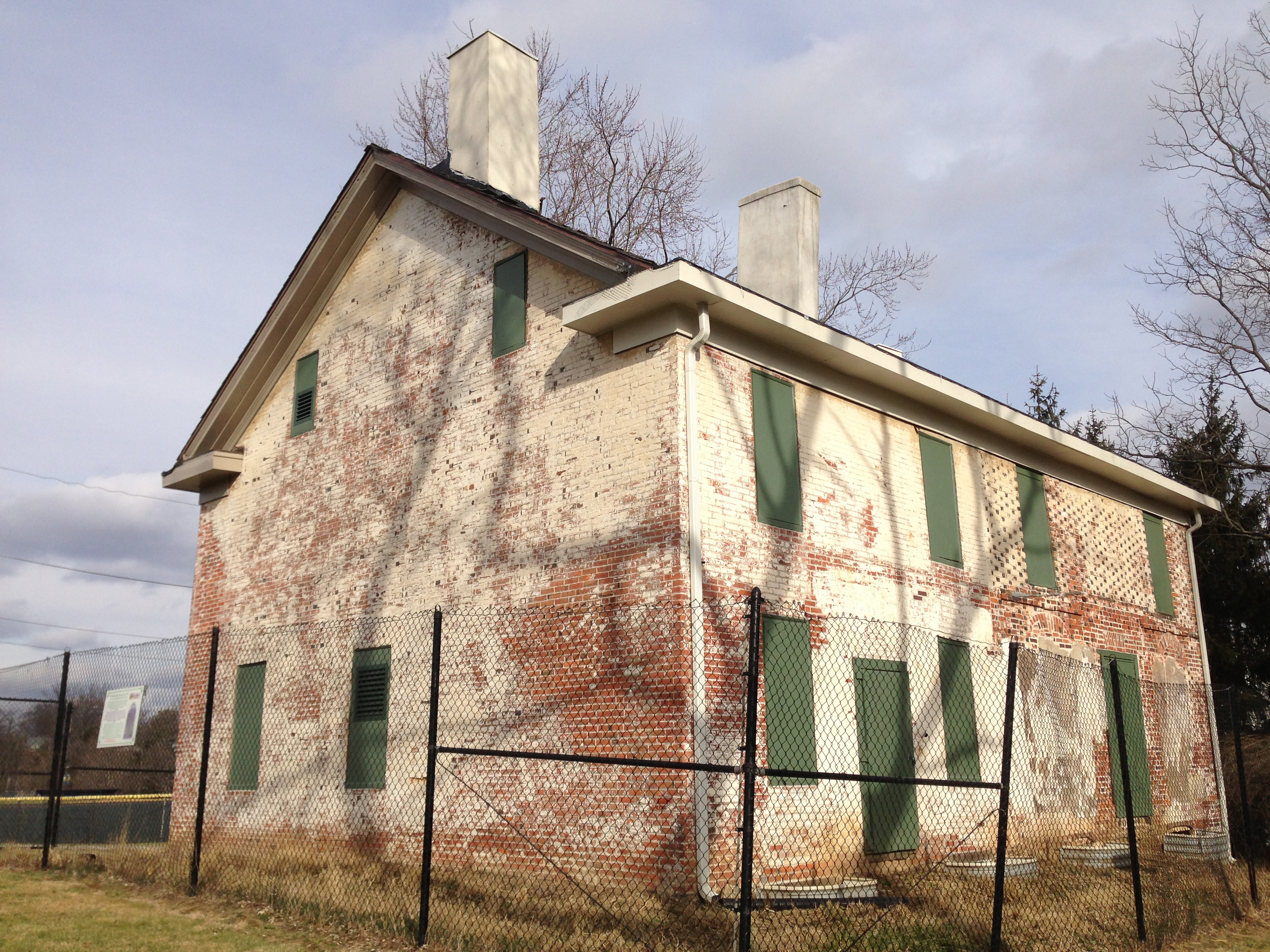

- Location within Mercer County, New Jersey Location within New Jersey Location within the United States
- Location: Metzger Drive, Ewing Township, New Jersey
- Coordinates: 40°15′54.2″N 74°46′38.6″W
- Built: c. 1717
- NRHP reference No.: 73001106
- NJRHP No.: 1645

Significant dates
- Added to NRHP: December 4, 1973
- Designated NJRHP: September 6, 1973

The William Green House is a historic brick farmhouse in Ewing Township of Mercer County, New Jersey, United States. It was added to the National Register of Historic Places on December 4, 1973, for its significance in agriculture and architecture.

== History and description ==
The first home on the site was built in the last decade of the 17th century. According to a privately published family monograph, the farmhouse was the home of Judge William Green, who was born in the 1600s in England and died in 1722 in Hunterdon County, New Jersey. The oldest parts of the current structure date to c. 1717 and the newest to 1830. The house is owned by the College of New Jersey, but is in a poor state of repair. It has been considered an endangered historic site for over 40 years and, despite efforts taken by the college in 2006 to shore up the structure, was listed in 2015 as one of New Jersey's 10 most endangered historic sites by Preservation New Jersey.

== See also ==
- National Register of Historic Places listings in Mercer County, New Jersey
- List of the oldest buildings in New Jersey
