= William Leaton House =

Historic house in Tennessee, United States

- U.S. National Register of Historic Places
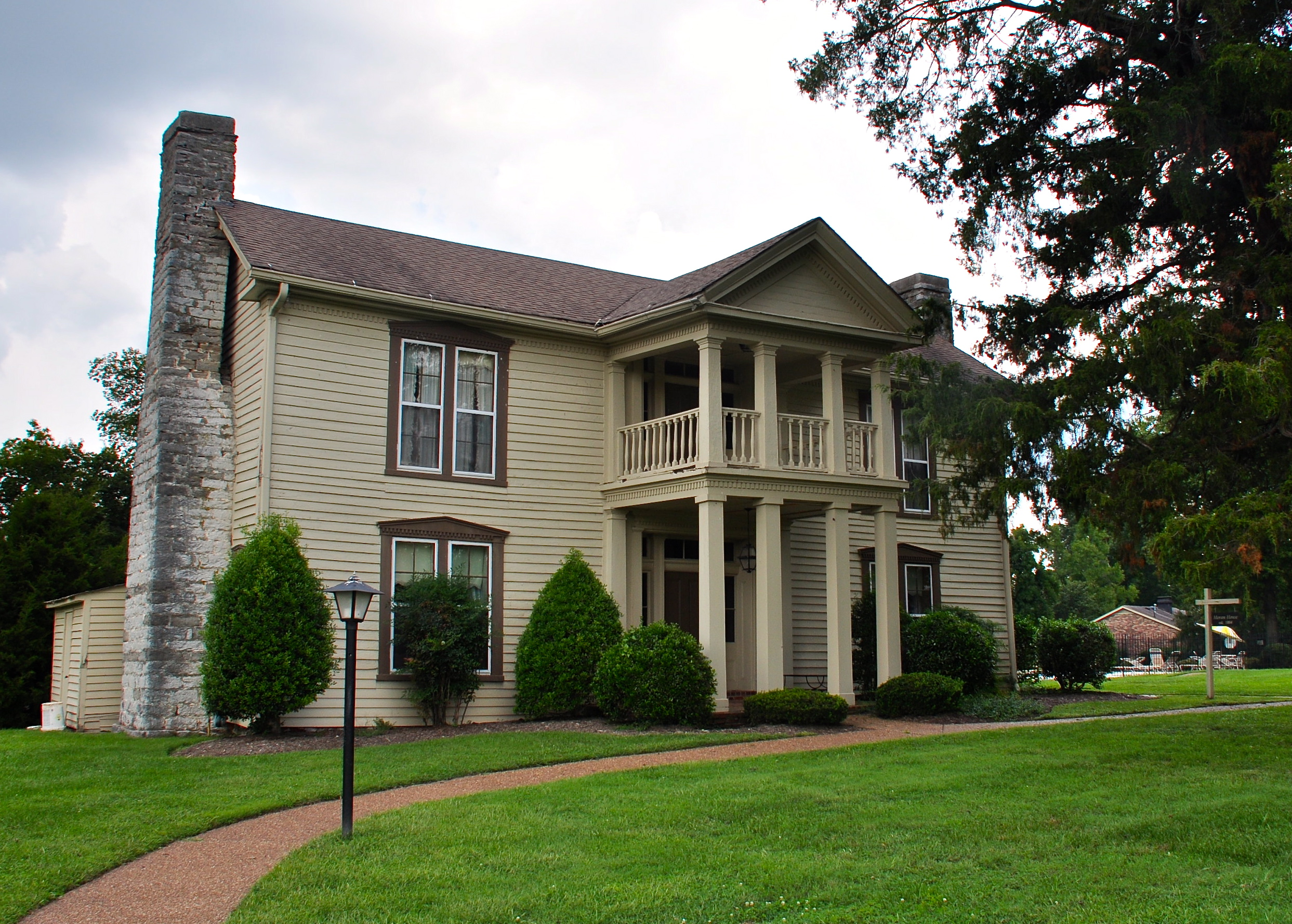
- William Leaton House, September 2014.

- Location within Tennessee Location within the United States
- Location: Hillsboro Rd./US 431 at Manely Ln., Franklin, Tennessee
- Coordinates: 36°00′40″N 86°53′21″W
- Area: 3 acres (1.2 ha)
- Built: c. 1802 and c. 1850
- Architectural style: Greek Revival, Central passage plan
- MPS: Williamson County MRA
- NRHP reference No.: 88000357
- Added to NRHP: April 13, 1988

The William Leaton House is a property in Franklin, Tennessee, United States, that dates from c.1802 and that was listed on the National Register of Historic Places in 1988. It has also been known as Grassland. It includes Central passage plan and other architecture.

The property was covered in a 1988 study of Williamson County historical resources.
