= Jonathan Green House =

Historic house in Massachusetts, United States

- U.S. National Register of Historic Places
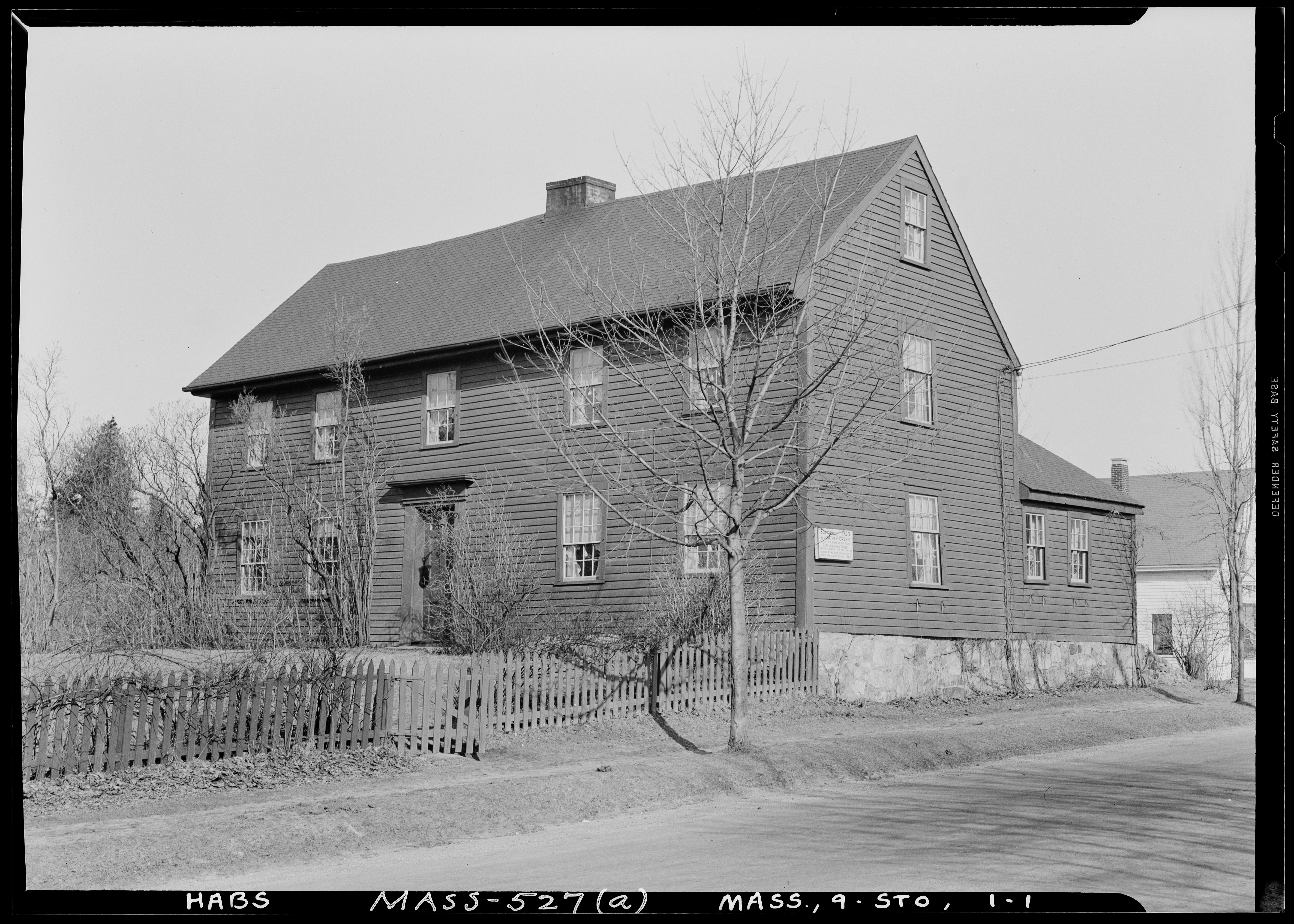

- Location within Massachusetts Location within the United States
- Location: 63 Perkins St., Stoneham, Massachusetts
- Coordinates: 42°28′1″N 71°4′50″W
- Built: 1720
- Architectural style: Georgian, Colonial Vernacular
- MPS: Stoneham MRA
- NRHP reference No.: 84002627
- Added to NRHP: April 13, 1984

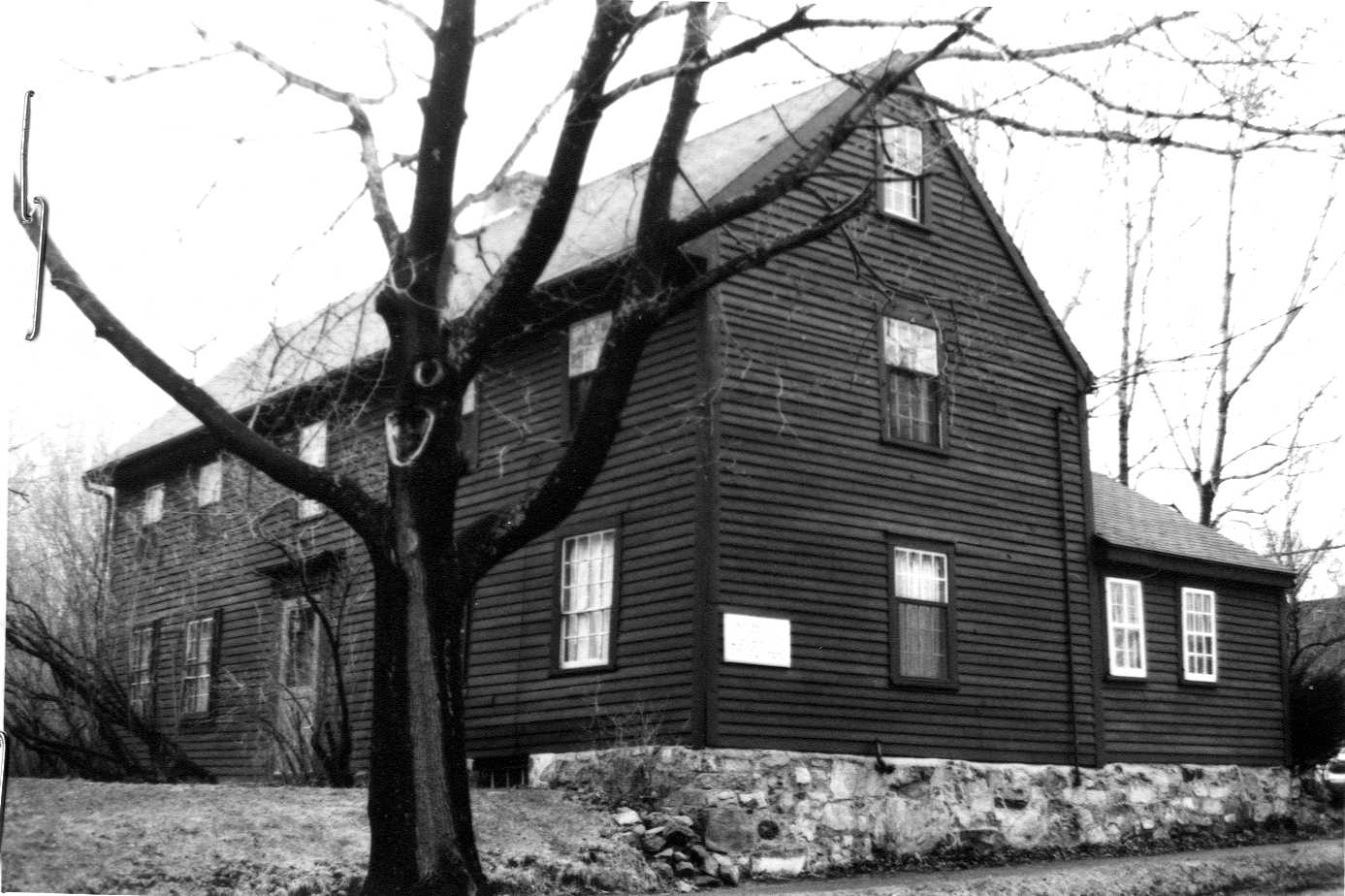
View from front corner, 1979

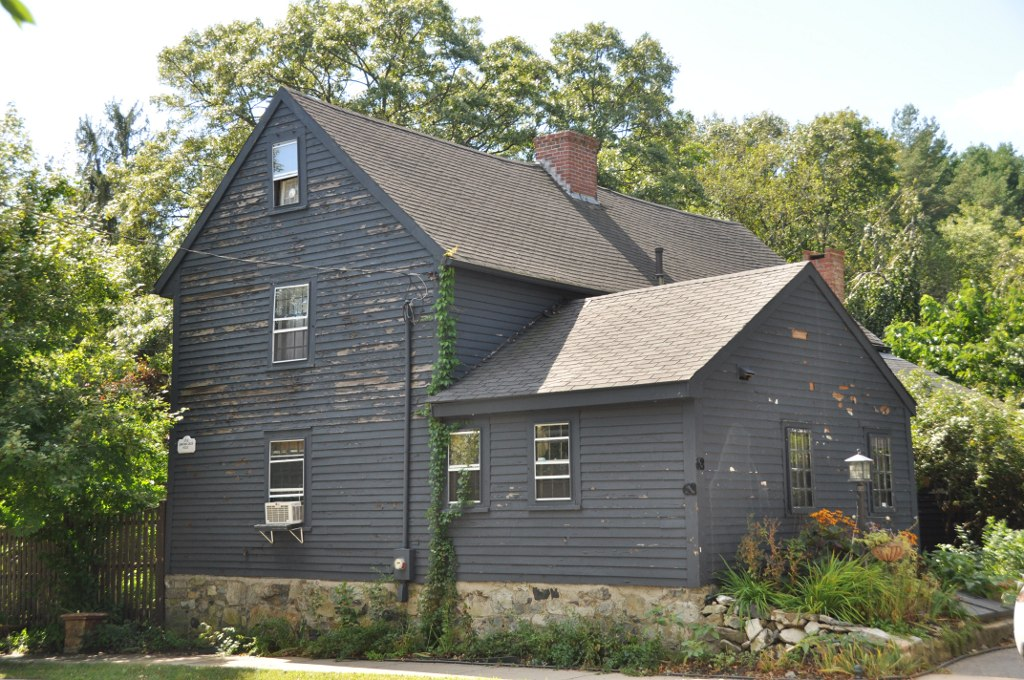
View from rear corner, showing northeastern ell, 2011

The Jonathan Green House is a historic First Period Colonial American house, built c. 1700–1720. It is located at 63 Perkins Street, Stoneham, Massachusetts. It was listed on the National Register of Historic Places in 1984. It is one of the oldest structures in Stoneham, and one of only two structures in Stoneham preserving a nearly intact early eighteenth century form.

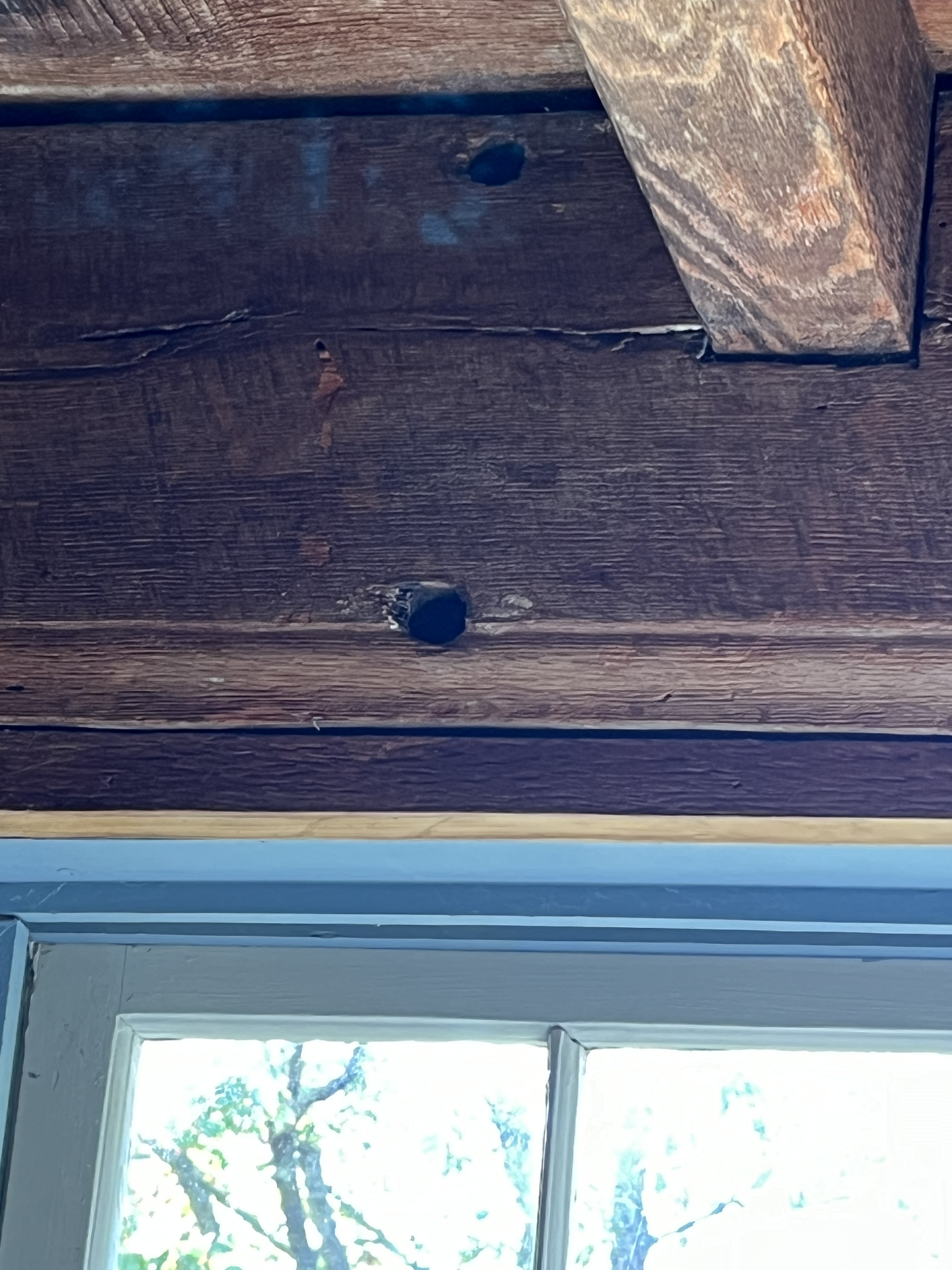
Single-story stud pin holes

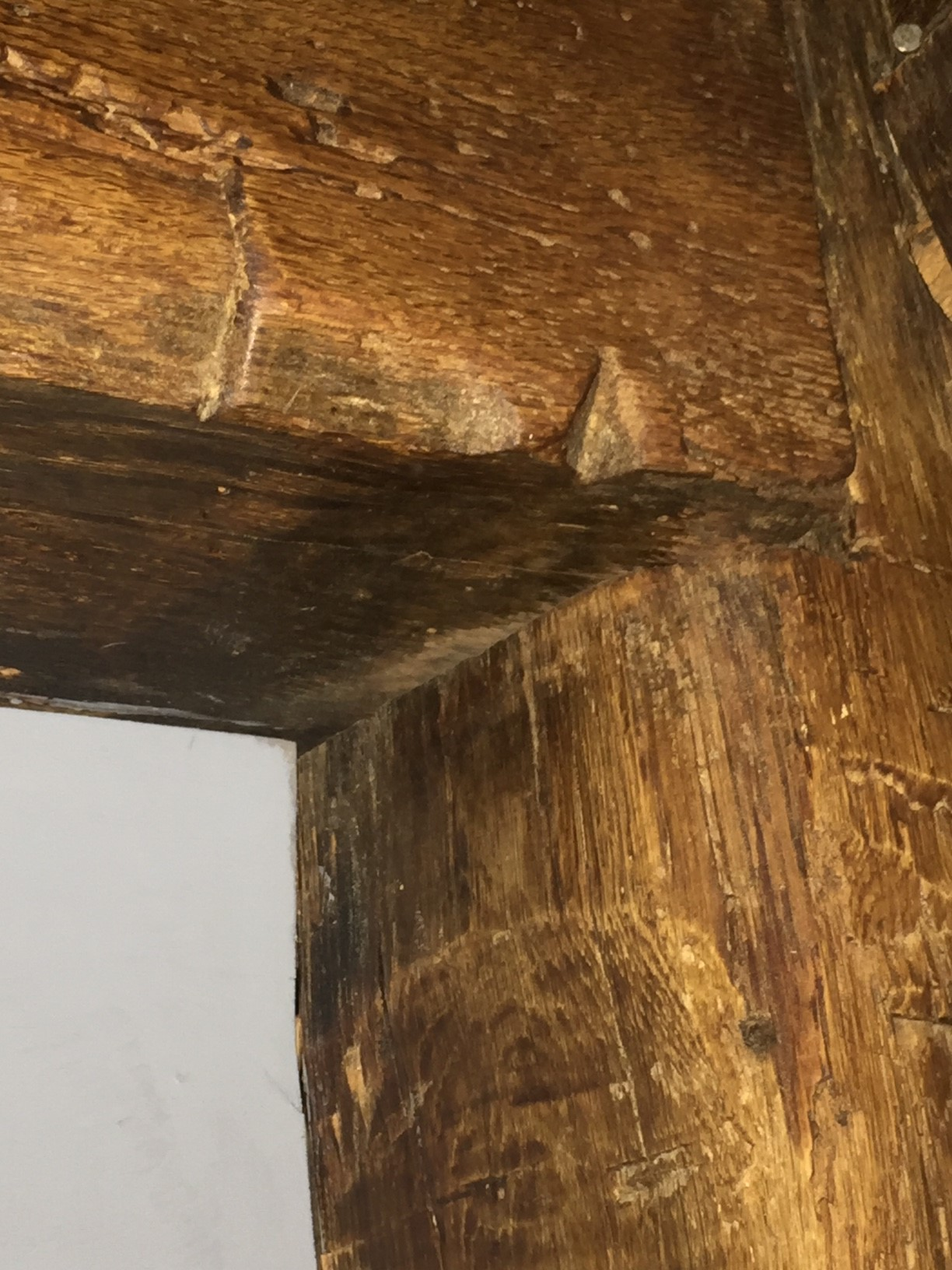
East chimney girt with larks's tongue stop and notch, joining the rear chimney post. All original framing members retain traces of whitewash beneath later lath and plaster evidence.

== Construction history ==
Typical of the early architecture of the colonial period, the construction of the Jonathan Green House is functional and straightforward. When originally built, the house would have been located near the seventeenth century borders of Charlestown and Malden, Massachusetts, in what is now Stoneham. It was a single cell: a single room of two structural bays, plus an end chimney bay with the primary entrance and staircase located in front of the chimney stack. Pairs of pin holes in the front girt indicate the use of single-story studs and earlier, possibly asymmetrical, window placement. The area to the east of the chimney was used as a stable. Currently, the main block is two and a half stories high, five bays wide, and one room deep, with a central chimney, a granite foundation and clapboard sheathing. However, cedar shingle evidence survives under the added lean-to on the North side. The centered entrance had been framed by simple pilasters and topped by a modest entablature (no longer extant). Single story ells project from the northeast and northwest corners.

== Later history ==
Home to several generations of the Green family throughout the 18th and 19th centuries, its most notable resident was Capt. Jonathan Green, a prominent citizen of Stoneham, who served as town clerk and treasurer, and represented the town at a Constitutional Convention to consider a constitution reported in the summer of 1787 by the Constitutional Convention in Philadelphia.

In 1825 and 1826 the house served as the Stoneham school house. In 1853 following the annexation of land in Stoneham to become the Melrose Highlands, this house and several others near the town line were granted the privilege of sending children occupants to school within the town of Melrose.

== See also ==
- List of historic houses in Massachusetts
- List of the oldest buildings in Massachusetts
- List of the oldest buildings in the United States
- Millard-Souther-Green House, c. 1700
- National Register of Historic Places listings in Stoneham, Massachusetts
- National Register of Historic Places listings in Middlesex County, Massachusetts

== Bibliography ==
- Dean, Silas (1870). A Brief History of the Town of Stoneham, Massachusetts. Stoneham, Mass.: Sentinel Press. p. 12. "Jonathan Green stoneham."
- Dean, Silas (1880). "Stoneham". In Drake, Samuel Adams (ed.). History of Middlesex County, Massachusetts. Boston: Estes and Lauriat. p. 341. "341."
- Elliot, Jonathan (1891). The Debates in the Several State Conventions on the Adoption of the Federal Constitution, as Recommended by the General Convention at Philadelphia, in 1787. Vol. 2. Philadelphia: Lippincott.
- Stevens, William Burnham (1891). History of Stoneham, Massachusetts. Stoneham, Mass.: F.L. & W. E. Whittier.
