= William Green House (Rochester, Iowa) =

Historic house in Iowa, United States

- U.S. National Register of Historic Places
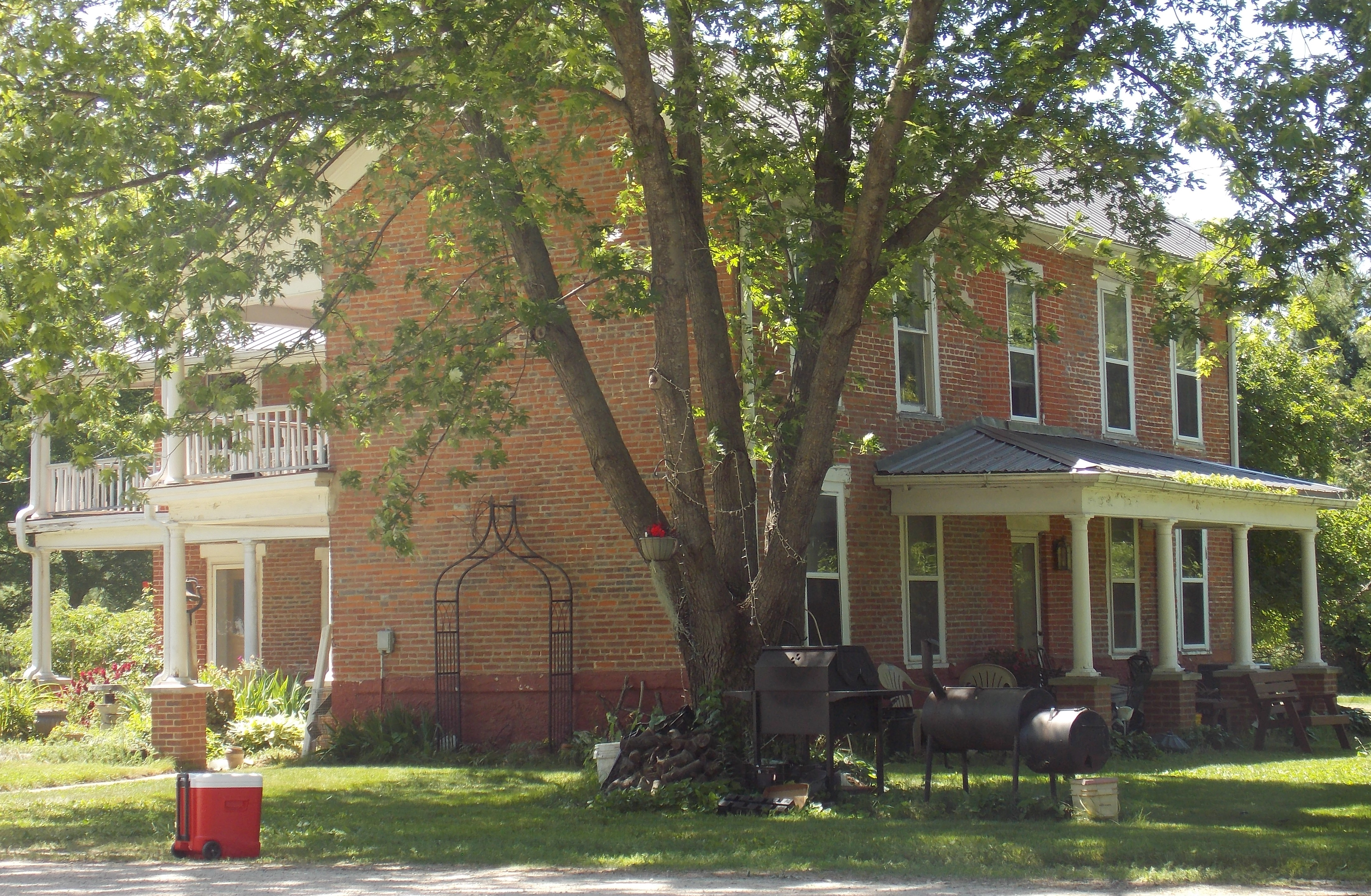
- The William Green House on Madison Street in Rochester

- Location within Iowa Location within the United States
- Location: 1709 Madison St. Rochester, Iowa
- Coordinates: 41°40′26.02″N 91°09′40.38″W
- Area: less than one acre
- Built: 1853
- NRHP reference No.: 99000488
- Added to NRHP: April 29, 1999

William Green House is a historic residence located in the unincorporated community of Rochester, Iowa, United States. It was listed on the National Register of Historic Places in 1999.

Rochester was established in 1836, making it the first settlement in Cedar County and its first county seat. William Green and his family arrived in May 1837. He bought and operated the sawmill, and became a partner in the county's first brick kiln. He was also involved in local politics. He built this house near the Cedar River in 1853. It is believed it was a stop on the Underground Railroad. Supposedly there was a tunnel between the house and the river bank. There is a "bricked-over doorway in the basement and a cell-like hole under the south portion of the house." John Brown stayed in nearby Springdale where his raid on Harper's Ferry was planned, and there were a number of other houses in the area that were also believed to be stops. A stage coach line between Davenport and Iowa City passed through Rochester and the house was an overnight stop for stage passengers after the Rochester Bridge was completed in 1880.

The house is a two-story, brick, L-shaped structure. There is a covered veranda on the river side of the house. The four up-stairs bedrooms, although one has been converted to a bathroom, open onto a balcony in the center of the L. Two staircases led to the second floor. A kitchen was added around 1900.
