= John Green House (Huntington Bay, New York) =

Historic house in New York, United States

- U.S. National Register of Historic Places
- Location within New York Location within the United States
- Location: 167 E. Shore Rd., Huntington Bay, New York
- Coordinates: 40°53′54″N 73°25′33″W
- Area: 3 acres (1.2 ha)
- Built: 1900
- Architectural style: Colonial Revival
- MPS: Huntington Town MRA
- NRHP reference No.: 85002526
- Added to NRHP: September 26, 1985

John Green House is a historic home located at Huntington Bay in Suffolk County, New York. It was built about 1900 and is a large, rambling 2 1/2-story, shingle-sheathed gable-roofed residence with gambrel-roofed side wings and a very large, five-bay rear wing. It features a wraparound, flat-roofed porch on paired fluted Doric order columns. It is representative of the Colonial Revival style. Also on the property is the building containing the original garage / servant's quarters.

It was added to the National Register of Historic Places in 1985.
