= Vaughn House =

Vaughn House may refer to:

- Vaughn House (Little Rock, Arkansas), listed on the National Register of Historic Places (NRHP) in Little Rock, Arkansas]
- Iredell P. Vaughn House, Eutaw, Alabama, listed on the National Register of Historic Places (NRHP)
- Robert Vaughn Homestead, Vaughn, Montana, listed on the NRHP in Montana
- Richard Vaughn Farm, Brecksville, Ohio, listed on the NRHP in Ohio
- Daniel Vaughn Homestead, Lake Milton, Ohio, listed on the NRHP in Ohio
- Andrew C. Vaughn House, Franklin, Tennessee, NRHP-listed

== See also ==
- Vaughan House (disambiguation)
