= Jordan–Williams House =

Historic house in Tennessee, United States

- U.S. National Register of Historic Places
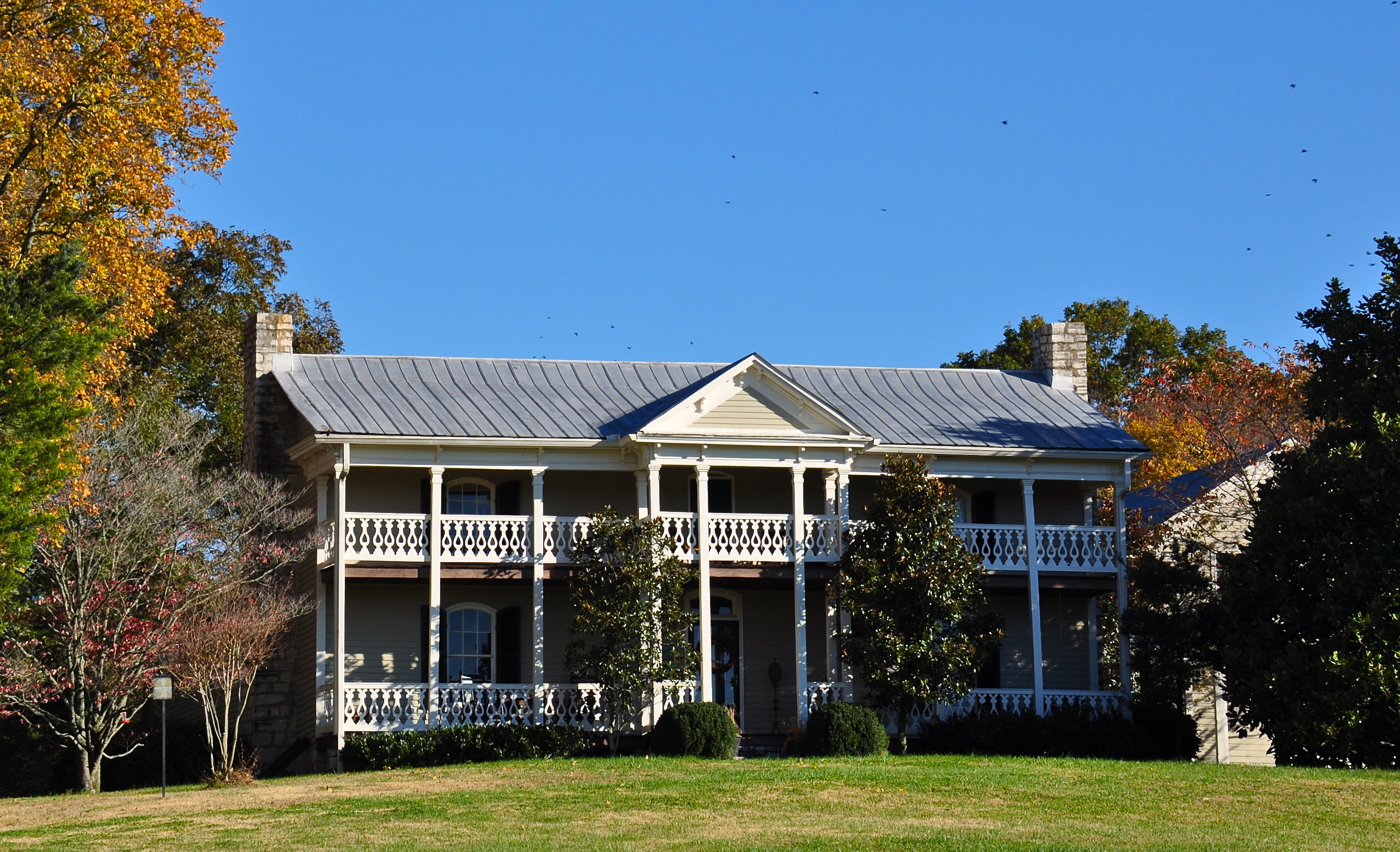
- The Jordan–Williams House in November 2013

- Location within Tennessee Location within the United States
- Location: Rocky Fork Rd. 2 mi. E of Nolensville, Nolensville, Tennessee
- Coordinates: 35°56′36″N 86°37′14″W
- Area: 10 acres (4.0 ha)
- Built: c. 1855
- Architectural style: Italianate, Central passage plan
- MPS: Williamson County MRA
- NRHP reference No.: 88000341
- Added to NRHP: April 13, 1988

The Jordan–Williams House is an Italianate style house in Nolensville, Tennessee that was listed on the National Register of Historic Places in 1988.

It was built or has other significance as of c.1855, and includes Central passage plan and Italianate architecture. When listed the property included one contributing building, one non-contributing building, and two non-contributing structures, on an area of 10 acres (4.0 ha).

According to a 1988 study of Williamson County historical resources, it is one of a handful of notable, historic Italianate style residences in the county, others being the James Wilhoite House, the John Hunter House, the Owen-Cox House, the Y.M. Rizer House (c. 1875, a combination of Italianate and Second Empire design), the Henry Pointer House, the Andrew C. Vaughn House, and the Thomas Critz House.

The property is denoted as Williamson County historic resource WM-197.

The house "features an elaborate milled porch with extensive decoration and is one of the best examples of this style home in the county." Built by Edward J. Jordan, it became the home of his daughter Elizabeth and her husband Thomas G. Williams, who had served in the 20th Tennessee Infantry.
