= James Wilhoite House =

Historic house in Tennessee, United States

- U.S. National Register of Historic Places
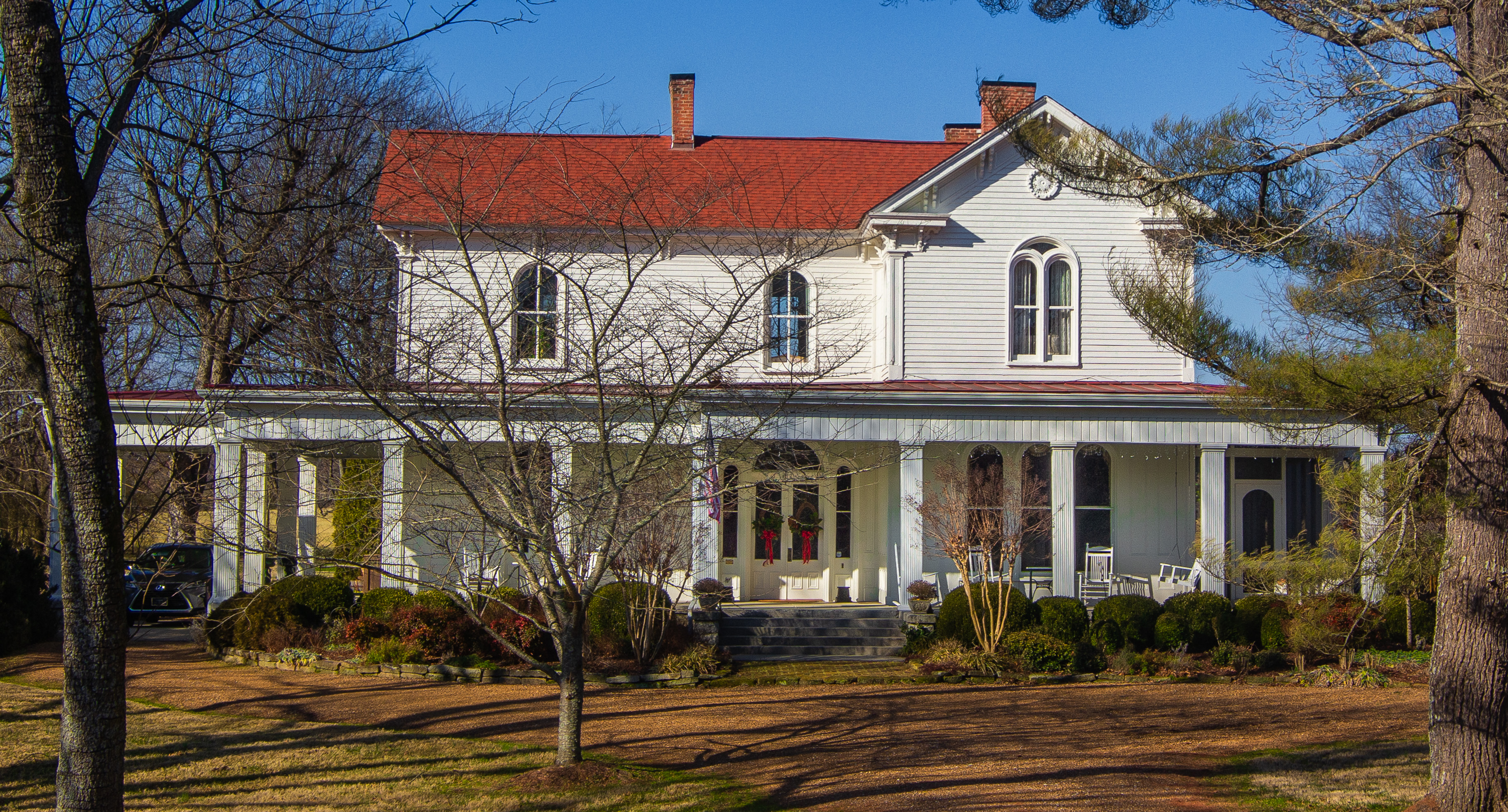
- James Wilhoite House

- Location within Tennessee Location within the United States
- Location: US Alt. 31, Allisona, Tennessee
- Coordinates: 35°45′19.17″N 86°41′33.98″W
- Area: 1.4 acres (0.57 ha)
- Built: c.1877, c.1900 and c.1910
- Architectural style: Italianate
- MPS: Williamson County MRA
- NRHP reference No.: 88000370
- Added to NRHP: April 13, 1988

The James Wilhoite House is a historic Italianate style house in Allisona, Tennessee, United States, that was listed on the National Register of Historic Places in 1988. The property is also known as the Reed Corlette House. It was built, remodeled, or has other significance in c. 1877, c. 1900, and c. 1910.

It includes Italianate architecture. When listed the property included two contributing buildings and three contributing structures, on an area of 1.4 acres (0.57 ha).

According to a 1988 study of Williamson County historical resources, it is one of a handful of notable, historic Italianate style residences in the county, others being the John Hunter House, the Andrew Vaughn House, the Owen-Cox House, the Y.M. Rizer House (c. 1875, a combination of Italianate and Second Empire design), the Henry Pointer House, the Jordan-Williams House, and the Thomas Critz House.
