= Thomas L. Critz House =

Historic house in Tennessee, United States

- U.S. National Register of Historic Places
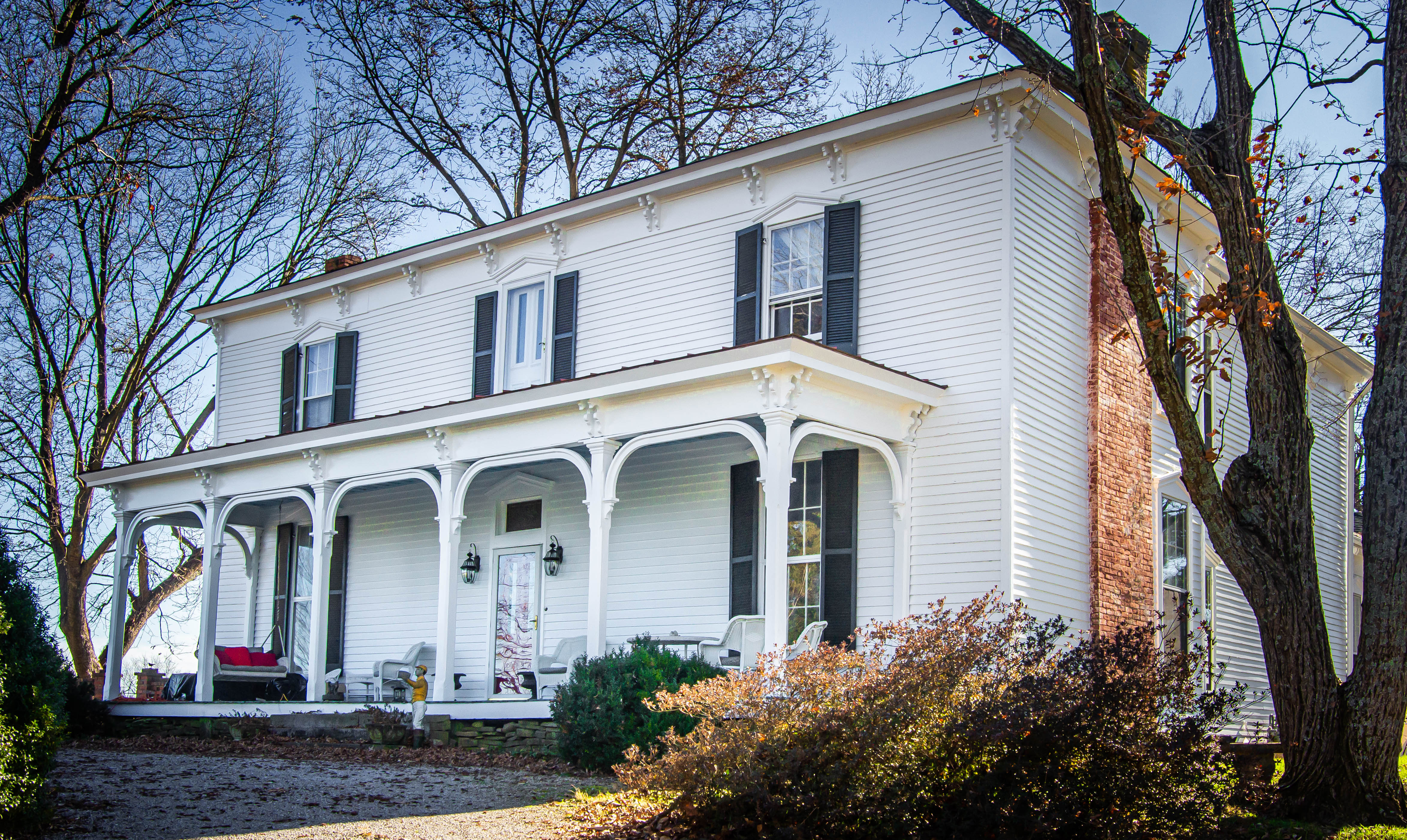
- Thomas L. Critz House

- Location within Tennessee Location within the United States
- Location: Critz Ln. 1 mi. E of Columbia Pike/US 31, Thompsons Station, Tennessee
- Coordinates: 35°48′38″N 86°52′50″W
- Area: 5.9 acres (2.4 ha)
- Built: c.1887
- Architectural style: Italianate, Central passage plan, ell plan architecture
- MPS: Williamson County MRA
- NRHP reference No.: 88000342
- Added to NRHP: April 13, 1988

The Thomas L. Critz House, built c.1887, is a historic Italianate style house in Thompsons Station, Tennessee that was listed on the National Register of Historic Places in 1988. It is a two-story frame residence with a Central passage plan. It has a one-story porch with square chamfered columns.

When listed the property included one contributing building and one non-contributing site, on an area of 5.9 acres (2.4 ha).

According to a 1988 study of Williamson County historical resources:

Outside of Franklin, relatively few large brick and frame residences were built in the county. Notable exceptions include the Italianate style John Hunter House and Andrew Vaughn House. The Owen-Cox House on Moores Lane was also remodeled into an Italianate design during this period. One of the most significant houses built in the county after the war was the Y.M. Rizer House constructed on Del Rio Pike. Built ca. 1875, the house is a combination of Italianate and Second Empire detailing and is unique in the county. Important Italianate design frame dwellings built in the 1870s include the Henry Pointer House, Jordan-Williams House, the James Wilhoite House and the Thomas Critz House.
