= Y. M. Rizer House =

Historic house in Tennessee, United States

- U.S. National Register of Historic Places
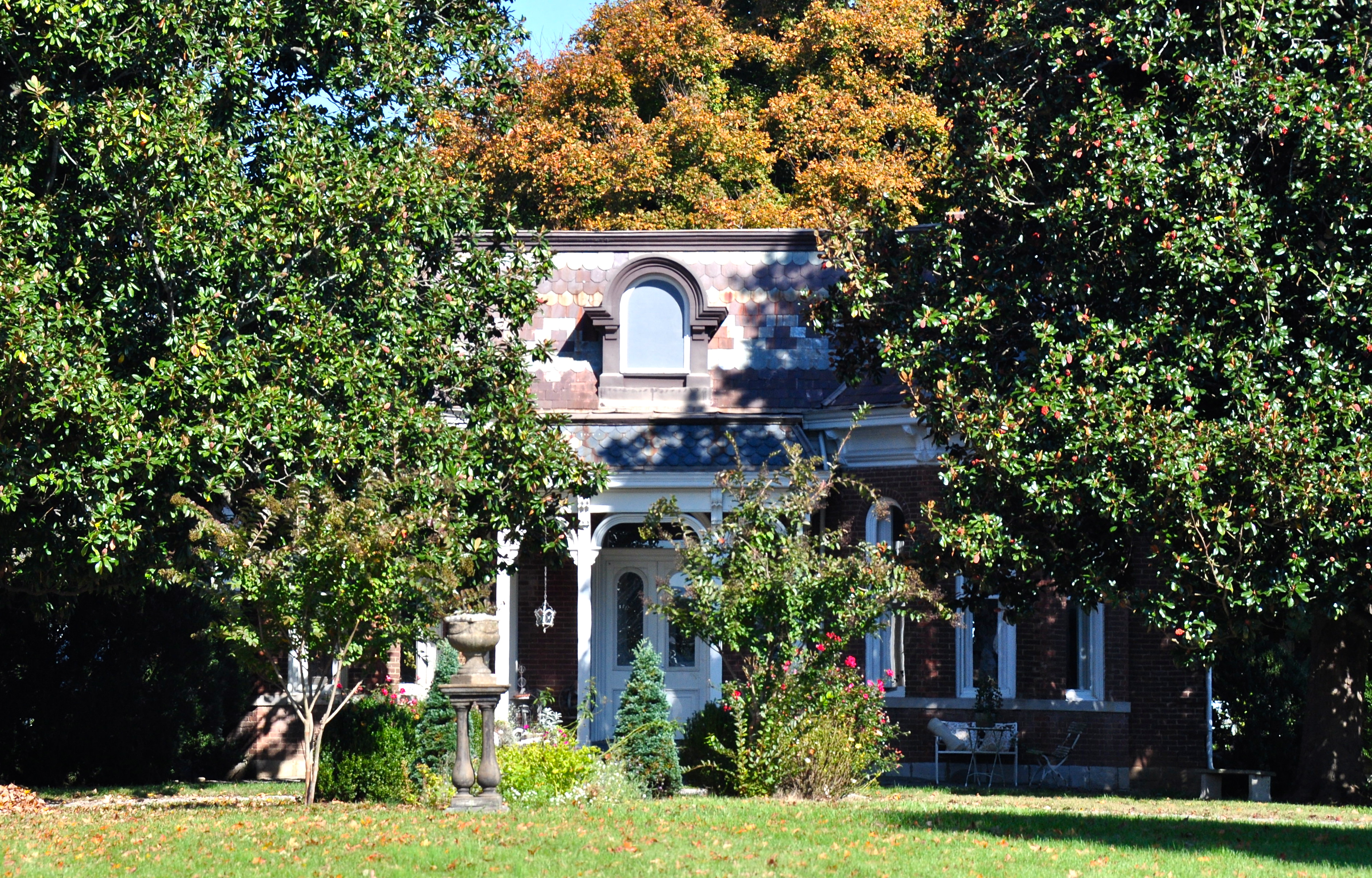
- Y.M. Rizer House, October 2014.

- Location within Tennessee Location within the United States
- Location: Del Rio Pike 3/4 mi. W of Hillsboro Rd., Franklin, Tennessee
- Coordinates: 35°56′16″N 86°53′12″W
- Area: 2.2 acres (0.89 ha)
- Built: c. 1874
- Architectural style: Second Empire
- MPS: Williamson County MRA
- NRHP reference No.: 88000348
- Added to NRHP: April 13, 1988

The Y. M. Rizer House, also known as Mapleshade, is an Italianate and Second Empire style house dating from c.1874 in Franklin, Tennessee that was listed on the National Register of Historic Places in 1988.

According to a 1988 study of Williamson County historical resources, it is one of a handful of notable, historic Italianate style residences in the county, others being the James Wilhoite House, the John Hunter House, the Owen-Cox House, the Andrew C. Vaughn House, the Henry Pointer House, the Jordan-Williams House, and the Thomas Critz House.

When listed the property included one contributing building and one non-contributing structure on an area of 2.2 acres (0.89 ha).
