= Rizer =

Rizer is a surname. Notable people with the surname include:

- Ken Rizer (born 1964), American politician
- Maggie Rizer (born 1978), American model and activist

== See also ==
- Y. M. Rizer House, an Italianate and Second Empire style house
