= Andrew Vaughn (disambiguation) =

Andrew Vaughn (born 1998) is an American professional baseball player.

Andrew Vaughn may also refer to:

- Andrew Vaughn, character in The Mechanic
- Andrew C. Vaughn House, Franklin, Tennessee
