= Vaughan House =

Vaughan House may refer to:

- Vaughan House, Adelaide, historic "home for wayward girls" in Adelaide, South Australia
- Vaughan House (Little Rock, Arkansas), listed on the NRHP in Little Rock, Arkansas

== See also ==
- John Vaughan House, Shandon, Ohio, NRHP-listed
- Myrick–Yeates–Vaughan House, Murfreesboro, North Carolina, listed on the NRHP in North Carolina
- Rebecca Vaughan House, Courtland, Virginia, NRHP-listed
- Rev. Joshua Vaughan House, Coatesville, Pennsylvania, NRHP-listed
- Roberts-Vaughan House, Murfreesboro, North Carolina, listed on the NRHP in North Carolina
- Vaughan Homestead, Hallowell, Maine, listed on the NRHP in Maine
- William Hatchette Vaughan House, Molalla, Oregon, listed on the NRHP in Clackamas County, Oregon
