= Troy Fleming =

American football player (born 1980)

No. 44
- Position: Fullback

Personal information
- Born: October 1, 1980 (age 46); Franklin, Tennessee, U.S.
- Listed height: 6 ft 0 in (1.83 m)
- Listed weight: 245 lb (111 kg)

Career information
- High school: Battle Ground Academy (Franklin)
- College: Tennessee
- NFL draft: 2004: 6th round, 191st overall pick

Career history
- Tennessee Titans (2004–2005); Denver Broncos (2007)*; Carolina Panthers (2008)*
- * Offseason or practice squad member only

Career NFL statistics
- Rushing attempts: 7
- Rushing yards: 40
- Rushing touchdowns: 0
- Receptions: 29
- Receiving yards: 233
- Receiving touchdowns: 3
- Stats at Pro Football Reference

Troy Majors Fleming (born October 1, 1980) is an American former professional football player who was a fullback in the National Football League (NFL). He was selected by the Tennessee Titans in the sixth round of the 2004 NFL draft. He played college football for the Tennessee Volunteers.

== Early life ==
Fleming attended Battle Ground Academy in Franklin, Tennessee and was a letterman in football, basketball, and track. In football, he led his teams to three Division II Class A Championships, was a three-time first-team All-State selection and a three-time All-Region selection, and was twice named Division II Class A Mister Football. He finished his career as the number two all time yards gainer in national high school football history, currently third all-time. He was a former coach at Concord Christian School in Knoxville, Tennessee. He is now employed by Knox County Parks and Recs in Knoxville. Fleming is now the defensive line coach at Knoxville Catholic.

== College career ==
Fleming attended the University of Tennessee at Knoxville. During his time there, he played running back for the Volunteers. As a freshman, he saw limited time on the field. He averaged 3.9 yards on nine carries and totaled 35 yards for the entire season. He caught the ball six times for 71 yards and averaged 11.8 YAC. He had no touchdowns receiving or rushing. As a sophomore, he averaged 4.2 yards on 24 carries and rushed for 102 yards. He caught the ball ten times for 39 and averaged 3.9 YAC. That year, he had three receiving touchdowns. As a junior, he carried the ball 34 times and rushed for 162 total yards averaging 4.8 and totaled one rushing touchdown. He caught the ball 21 times for 120 yards and averaged 5.7 YAC. As a senior, he rushed 17 for 43 averaging 2.5 yards. He caught the ball 36 times for 36 times for 262 and averaged 7.3 YAC and totaled 2 touchdowns.

== Professional career ==
Fleming was selected by the Tennessee Titans in the sixth round of the 2004 NFL draft with the 191st overall pick. He played two seasons for the Titans before being released in 2006. With the Titans, he started played 29 games and started two at Fullback. He rushed seven times for 40 yards and averaged 5.7 yards a carry in 2004. He caught 19 passes and totaled 164 yards averaging 8.6 YAC for two touchdowns. In 2005, Fleming caught 10 passes for 69 yards averaging 6.9 YAC for one touchdown. He later played for the Denver Broncos and Carolina Panthers.
