= Andrew C. Vaughn House =

Historic house in Tennessee, United States

- U.S. National Register of Historic Places
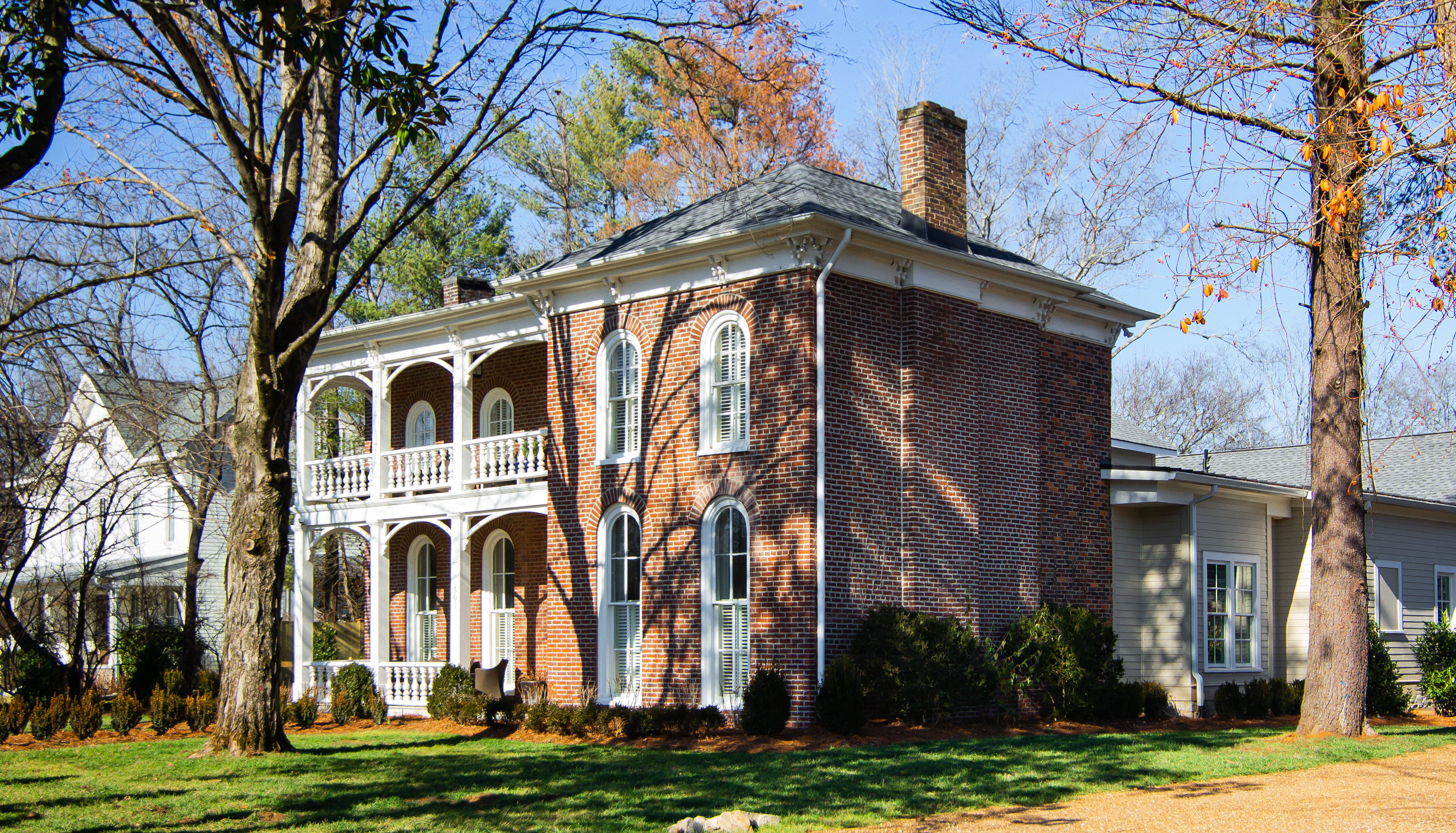
- Andrew C. Vaughn House

- Location within Tennessee Location within the United States
- Location: 501 Murfreesboro Rd., Franklin, Tennessee
- Coordinates: 35°55′9″N 86°51′36″W
- Area: 5 acres (2.0 ha)
- Built: c. 1873
- Architectural style: Italianate
- MPS: Williamson County MRA
- NRHP reference No.: 88000368
- Added to NRHP: April 13, 1988

The Andrew C. Vaughn House, also known as the McCall House, is a circa 1873 Italianate style house in Franklin, Tennessee.

It was listed on the National Register of Historic Places in 1988. When listed the property included two contributing buildings on 5 acres (2.0 ha).

According to a 1988 study of Williamson County historical resources, it is one of a handful of notable, historic Italianate style residences in the county, others being the James Wilhoite House, the John Hunter House, the Owen-Cox House, the Y.M. Rizer House (ca. 1875, a combination of Italianate and Second Empire design), the Henry Pointer House, the Jordan-Williams House, and the Thomas Critz House.
