= Battle Ground Academy =

School in Franklin, Tennessee, US

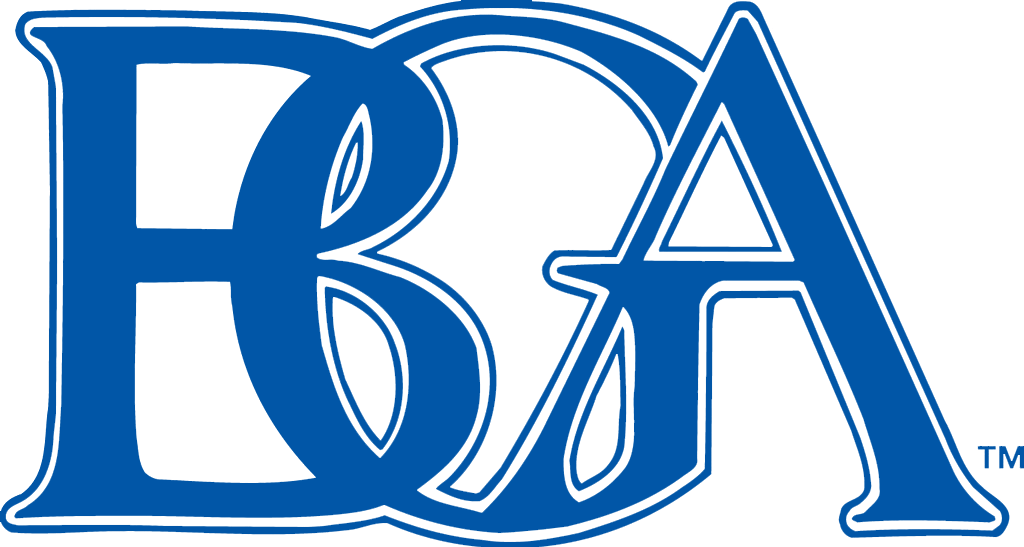

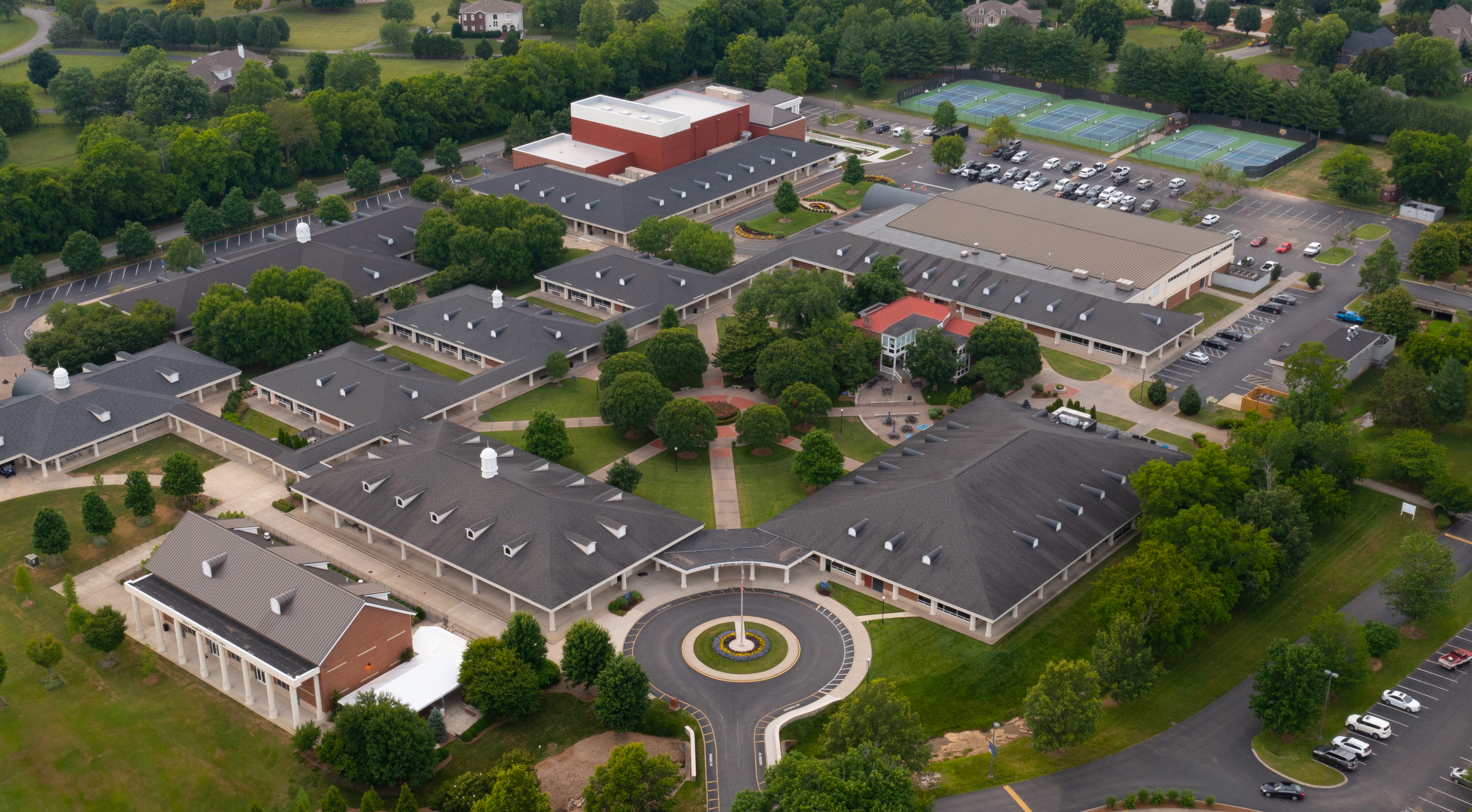
- Glen Echo campus

Location
- Franklin, Tennessee; United States; 35.9499°N 86.8590°W

Information
- Type: Independent, Coeducational, Nonsectarian Day School
- Motto: "Character, Scholarship, Excellence."
- Established: 1889
- CEEB code: 430700
- Head of School: Will Kesler
- Campus: Suburban
- Colors: Blue and gold
- Athletics conference: TSSAA Division II-AA
- Mascot: Wildcat
- Website: www.battlegroundacademy.org

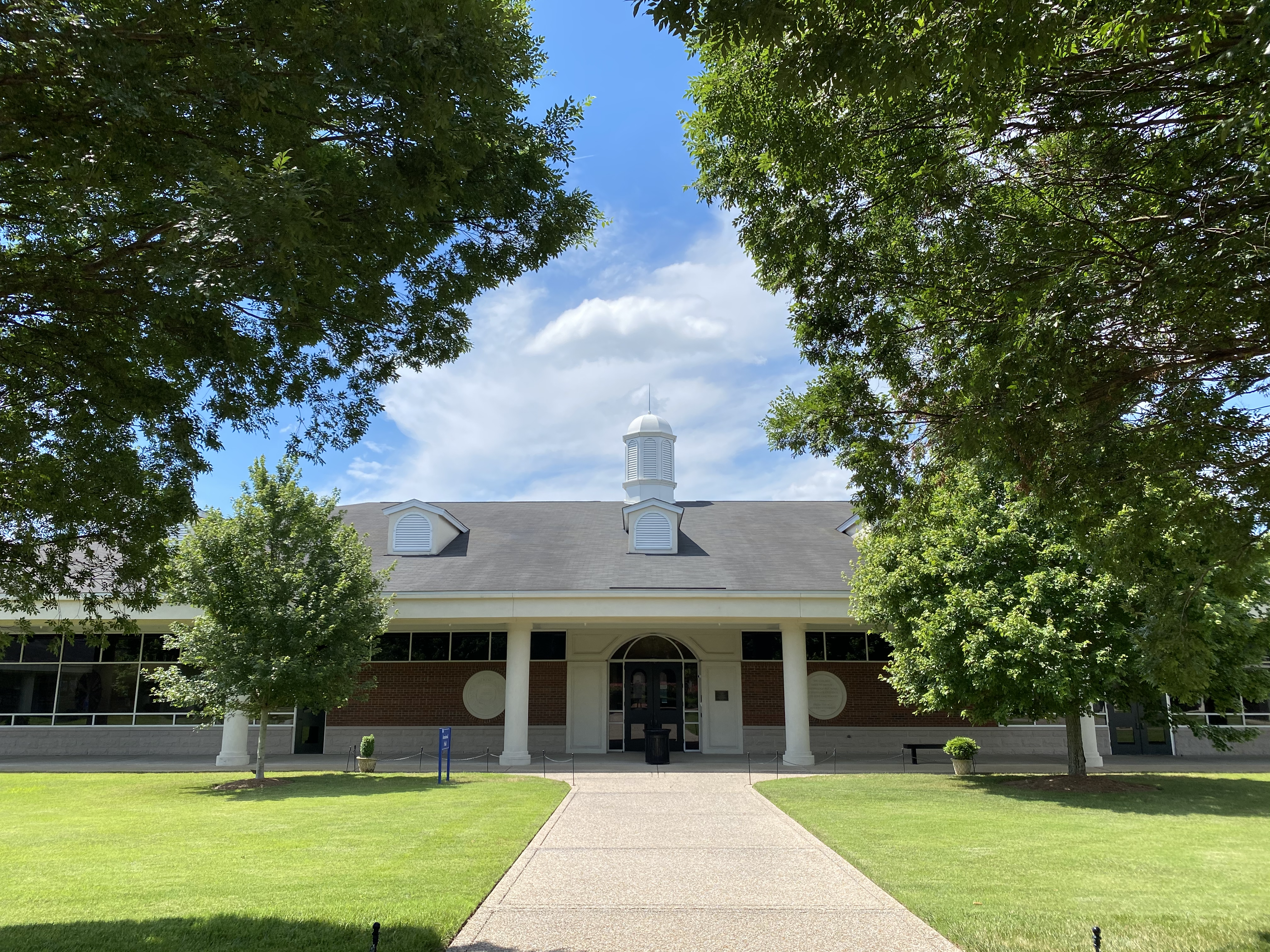
Armistead Hall

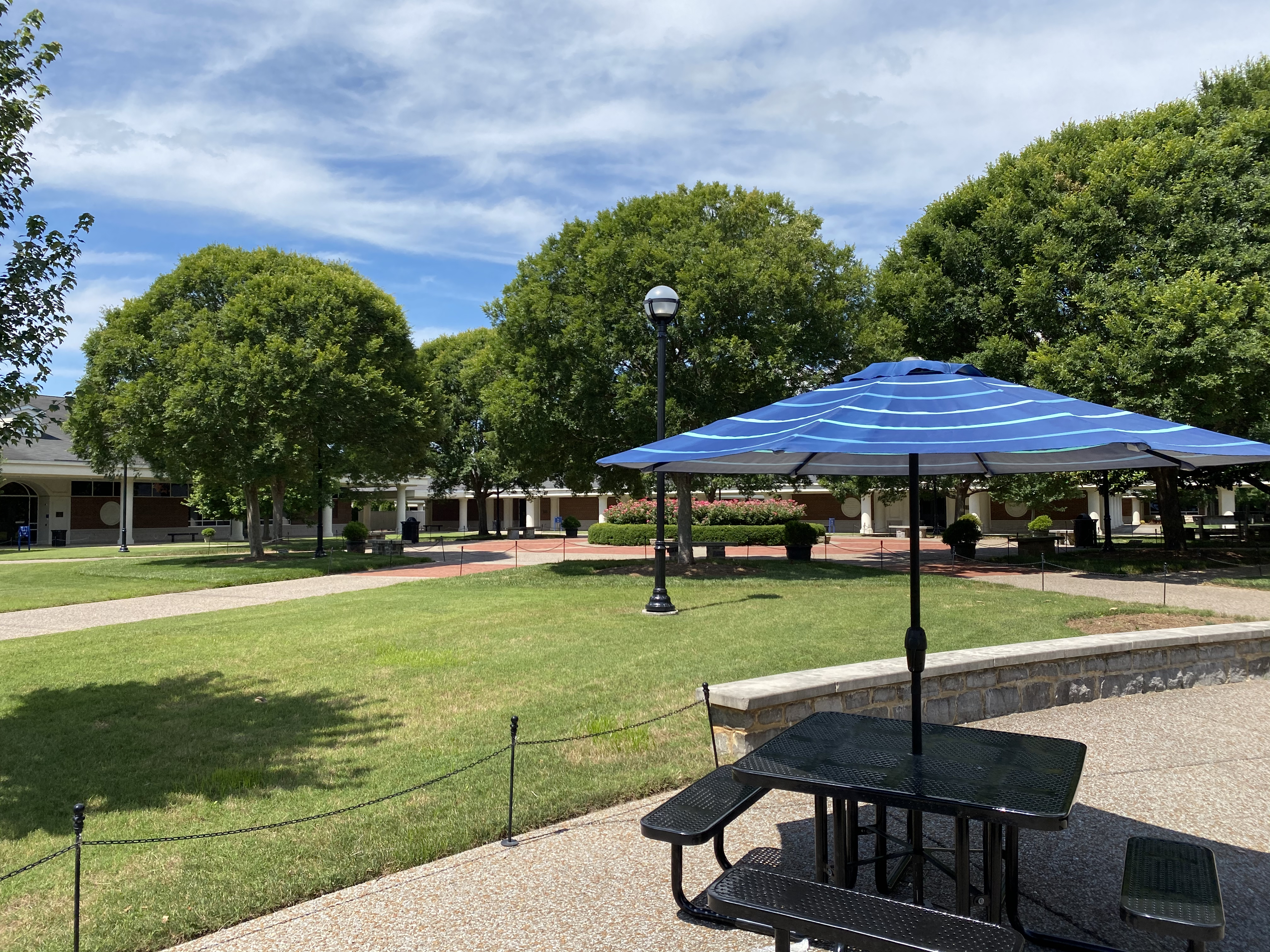
BGA Quadrangle

Battle Ground Academy (BGA) is an independent college-preparatory school for pre-K through 12th grade. BGA is located in Franklin, Tennessee, US. Founded in 1889, the school was originally located in part on the site of the Battle of Franklin in the American Civil War. BGA has two campuses and a separate location for its pre-K program. The Harpeth Campus is located on Franklin Road in the historic Cox House and is home to grades K-4. The Glen Echo campus is centered on historic plantation house Glen Echo and is located off Mack Hatcher Parkway and is home to grades 5 to 12. The Early Learning Center, BGA's pre-K program, is located at First Presbyterian Church of Franklin, Tennessee.

== History ==
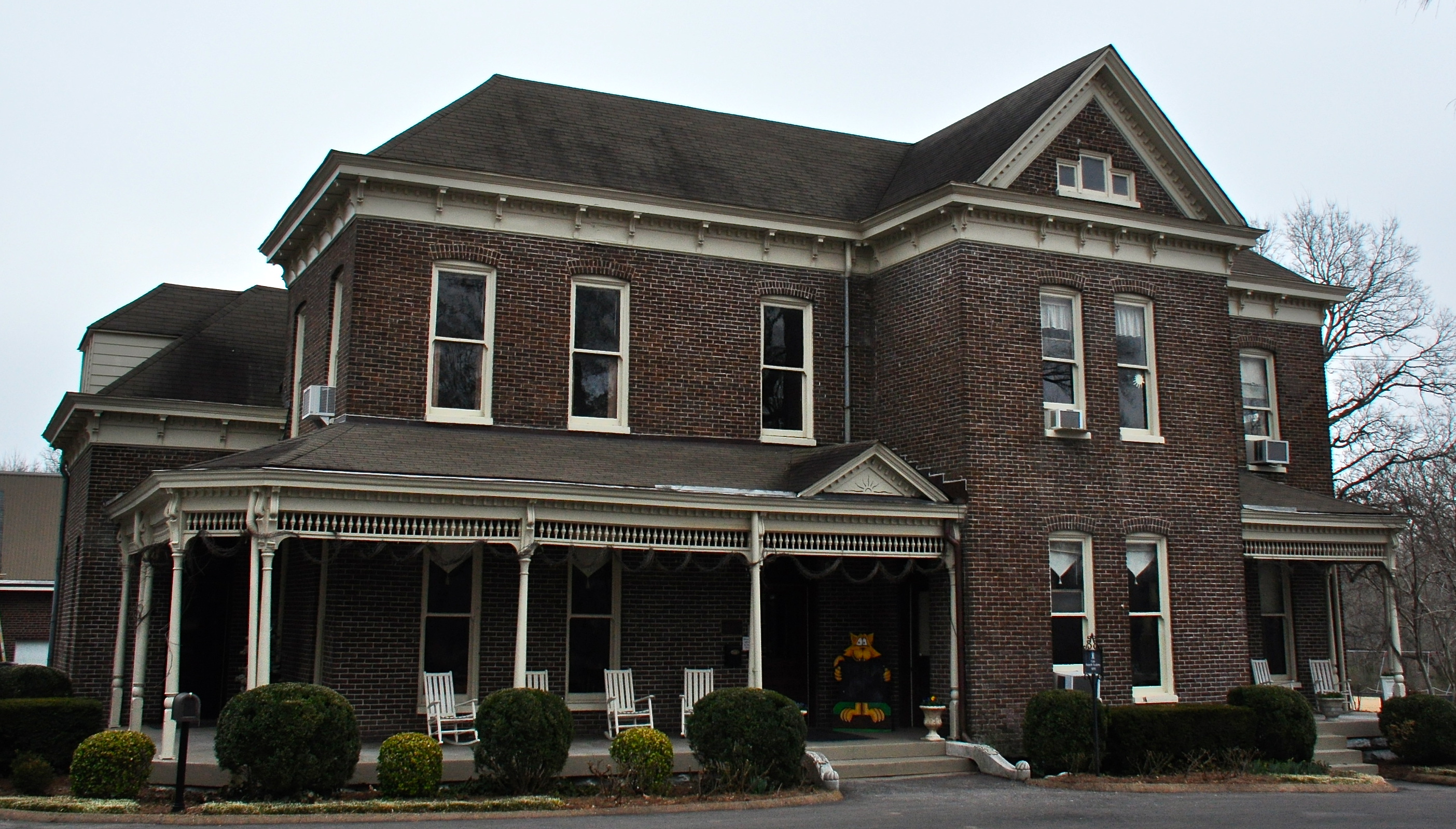
The Cox House, listed on the National Register of Historic Places, currently serves as the Battle Ground Academy Lower School.

Battle Ground Academy was established in 1889, and it was named for its original location during the Civil War Battle of Franklin.

The first campus was erected at the corner of Columbia Avenue and Cleburne Street. S. V. Wall and W. D. Mooney were chosen as the first to lead the new academy. In 1902, the original school building burned at which time the school was relocated to Columbia Avenue in Franklin.

BGA was established to educate boys originally and girls began to attend some time later. The school operated as a day school though students came from outside the local area to attend. They boarded in private homes until the first dormitory was built in 1922. At this time, BGA evolved to become a boarding and day school.

After the construction of the first dormitory, the decision was made to change to an all-male student body. The departure of the last girl students in 1929 ushered in a half-century when BGA was a boys' school.

In the early 1970s, the boarding program was phased out. BGA once again welcomed girls to its student body. At present, the female enrollment accounts for approximately 50 percent of the student body.

In 1996, the location of the Battle Ground Academy Upper School changed to the current site on Ernest Rice Lane (off of Mack Hatcher Parkway). In 2003, the Middle School joined the Upper School on the Glen Echo campus. Additionally, in 1998, Battle Ground Academy acquired the former Harpeth Academy. This became the BGA Lower School on Franklin Road. In 2024, BGA began its pre-K program, the Early Learning Center. Currently, the school operates at three physical campuses and has four divisions: the Early Learning Center, Lower School, Middle School, and Upper School.

One of the school's greatest traditions is "The Tug" starting in 1935, which is a student population wide tug of war over the Harpeth River ever single year amongst the school's two societies Greers and Platos. Once joining Battle Ground Academy, each student is assigned one of the societies that they will carry on with them for the rest of their lives.

== Student Honors ==
The BGA Artist Guild was established in 1987. As the Guild grew in size and prestige, the group began to have public performances. Guild Night has become a tradition for parents and students each year.. Board of Trust Merit Scholarships are provided to some of BGA's most promising incoming freshmen. This scholarship program was established in 2005 to recognize outstanding academic performance. Digamma is an in-school honor society. Members are BGA students who are sophomores, juniors or seniors having a cumulative academic GPA of 3.1.

== Plato vs Greer ==
Battle Ground Academy’s Greer v. Plato is a long-standing school tradition that started in 1935. The event is named for two symbolic sides: Plato, which takes its name from the ancient Greek philosopher, and Greer, which honors the last name of a former head of school. Students are divided into these teams starting in fourth grade and whenever a new student joins the school fostering school spirit and friendly rivalry across grade levels. A sorting ceremony is held at the beginning of each year to welcome the new middle school and high school students into one of two societies. One of the most notable traditions associated with the event is the annual tug-of-war held over the Harpeth River, in which high school students compete. This competition serves as both a physical challenge and a unifying activity that brings together the school community. Over time, Greer v. Plato has become a defining cultural event at Battle Ground Academy, celebrating tradition, teamwork, and school pride. There is also a middle school tug over the river that runs through the campus. The two societies also engage in several, smaller competitions throughout the school year to decide who has the advantageous side of the inclined river/hill.

== Notable alumni ==
- C. J. Beathard (2012), Jacksonville Jaguars quarterback
- Tucker Beathard (2014), country music singer
- Paul Woodrow "Woody Paul" Chrisman (1967), fiddle player and nuclear physicist, MIT Ph.D. Nuclear Physics, member of Riders in the Sky
- Joshua Crittenden “Josh” Cody (1911), college athlete, head coach and athletics director
- W. Wirt Courtney (1907), U.S. Representative from Tennessee
- Troy Fleming (1999), National Football League fullback
- McGavock Dickinson "Mac" Gayden (1958), singer and songwriter
- Bob Harris (1944), National Basketball Association basketball player
- Taylon Hope (2023), singer and songwriter
- Orrin H. Ingram II (1978), businessman
- Douglas S. Jackson (1972), former Tennessee State Senator and attorney
- Joe Jenkins, Major League Baseball catcher for the St. Louis Browns and Chicago White Sox
- Mike Keith (1986), radio announcer for the Tennessee Titans
- Wendell Mayes, screenwriter
- John P. Newsome, U.S. Representative from Alabama
- George Plaster (1978), Nashville sports radio personality
- Natalie Stovall (2000), country music artist
- Garnett Hollis (2019), Tennessee Titans Safety
- Trace Alexander "Trace's Oats" (2022), Social Media Influencer
