= Allisona, Tennessee =

- Unincorporated community
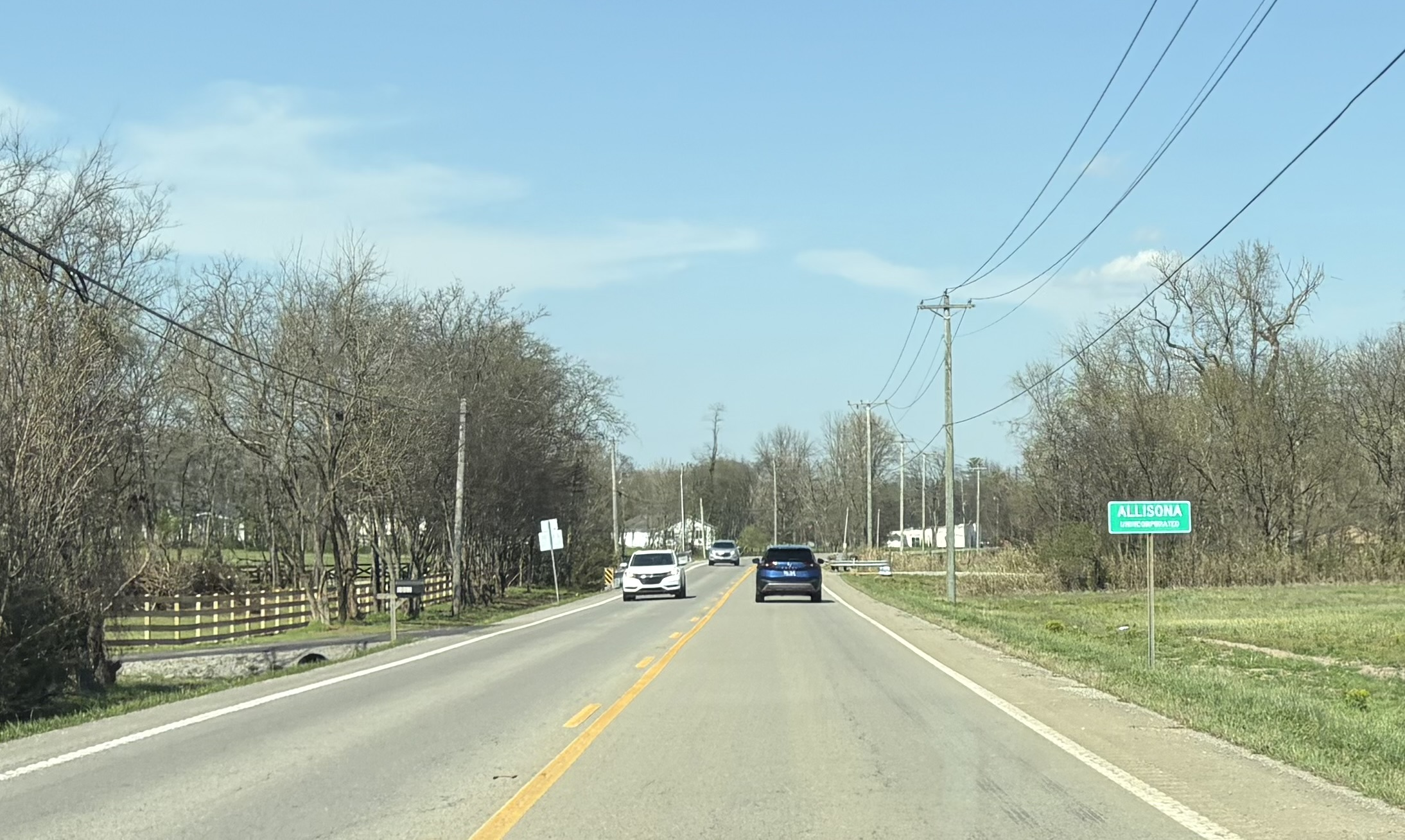
- Entering Allisona on Route 31A

- Location within Tennessee Location within the United States
- Coordinates: 35°45′17″N 86°41′31″W
- Country: United States
- State: Tennessee
- Counties: Rutherford and Williamson
- Elevation: 755 ft (230 m)
- Time zone: UTC-6 (Central (CST))
  - Summer (DST): UTC-5 (CDT)
- Area code: 615
- GNIS feature ID: 1304808

Allisona is an unincorporated community in Rutherford and Williamson counties, Tennessee.

Both U.S. Route 31A (State Route 11) and State Route 269 runs through the community, which is the location of the James Wilhoite House, which is listed on the U.S. National Register of Historic Places.

Allisona formerly had a post office. Newton Cannon, who represented Tennessee in the U.S. Congress from 1814 to 1817 and 1819 to 1823 and served as the state's governor from 1835 to 1839, and for whom Cannon County, Tennessee is named, had an estate near Allisona, where he is buried.
