= Cox House (Franklin, Tennessee) =

Historic house in Tennessee, United States

- U.S. National Register of Historic Places
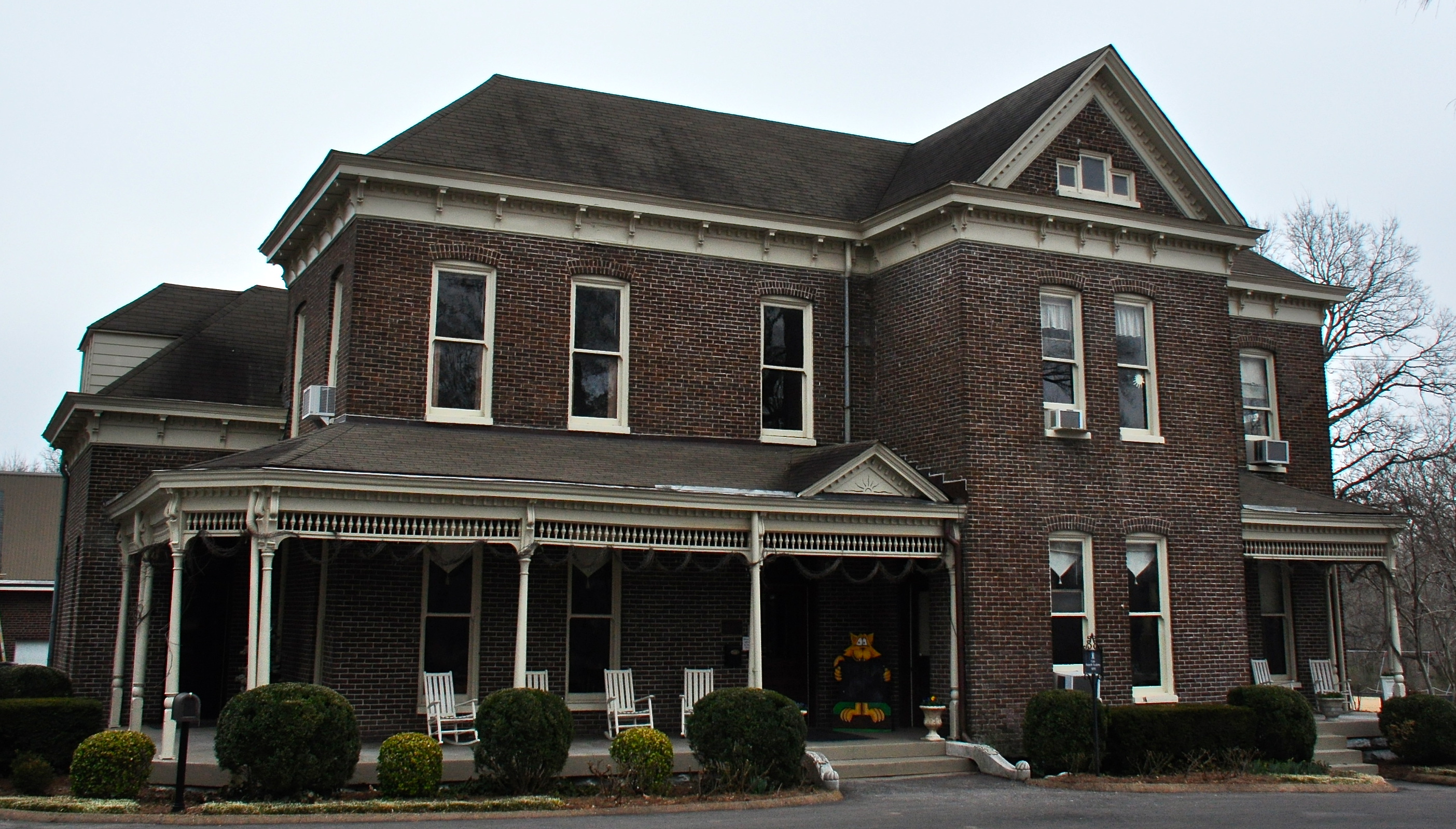
- Cox House in 2014

- Location within Tennessee Location within the United States
- Location: 150 Franklin Rd., Franklin, Tennessee
- Coordinates: 35°55′43″N 86°51′54″W
- Area: 5.8 acres (2.3 ha)
- Built: 1891, 1972 and 1975
- Architect: Woods & Crabb
- Architectural style: Late Victorian
- NRHP reference No.: 80003881
- Added to NRHP: February 28, 1980

Cox House is a building in Franklin, Tennessee, that was listed on the National Register of Historic Places in 1980. It is also known as the Harpeth Academy building.

It was built in 1891 for Congressman Nicholas Nichol Cox. It was extended in 1972 and again in 1975. It was designed by architects Woods & Crabb. It includes Late Victorian architecture. The listing was for an area of 5.8 acres (2.3 ha) with just one contributing building.

It was purchased in 1969 by the Harpeth Academy, a private elementary school that itself is a historic institution, to be used as an administration building. It is now part of Battle Ground Academy.

== See also ==
- Owen-Cox House, also NRHP-listed in Williamson County
