= Taylon Hope =

American singer-songwriter (born 2005)

- Born: Taylon Hope Miller; May 18, 2005 (age 20); Ashe County, North Carolina, U.S.
- Occupations: Singer; songwriter; musician
- Years active: 2013–present
- Awards: Inspirational Country Music Award (twice in 2016); Josie Award (2016); Josie Award (2017); Josie Award (2018); Josie Award (2019)

Taylon Hope Miller (born May 18, 2005), known professionally as Taylon Hope, is an American singer, songwriter, and musician.

== Early life ==
Hope was born Taylon Hope Miller on May 18, 2005, in Ashe County, North Carolina. She spent much of her childhood years in West Jefferson, North Carolina, developing a passion for music at the age of 4. Hope resided in North Carolina until 2017, opting to move to Nashville, Tennessee to pursue her musical ambitions.

== Career ==
Hope's career began in 2013, at the age of 8, when she and her parents travelled across their home state of North Carolina, performing at various small venues.

Her career progressed through the 2010s. In 2014, Hope released her first EP, titled What This World Needs, which was produced by award-winning country artist Tommy Brandt. The title track broke the Top 30 on The Power Source Inspirational Country Chart that year.

In 2016, Hope began working with Grammy-nominated Kent Wells, a producer for Dolly Parton and band leader. Later that year, she released her second CD, Showin' My Roots, to much success. Hope co-wrote all of the songs on the project, and the title track broke the Top 100 on MusicRow. She has been featured in both Billboard Magazine and MusicRow Magazine.

In October 2017, she performed on the stage of the Grand Ole Opry House at a tribute show for bluegrass artist Ralph Stanley. In October 2018, Hope opened for Shenandoah at an event center in her home county.

Hope's career continued into the 2020s, sharing the stage with Dolly Parton and other well-known country artists at Ryman Auditorium in January 2020. The COVID-19 pandemic caused numerous cancellations of her scheduled performances in 2020. She resumed stage performances in 2021.

In 2023, Hope performed at CMA Fest in Nashville, Tennessee.

== Personal life ==
Taylon Hope graduated from Battle Ground Academy in 2023. Hope is currently enrolled at Belmont University, a Christian university in Nashville, Tennessee. She is a member of Belmont's Curb College of Entertainment and is pursuing degrees in songwriting and broadcast journalism.

== Discography ==
During her career, Taylon Hope has released two studio albums, two extended plays, and 11 singles.

=== Studio albums ===
- Showin' My Roots (2016)
- Taylon Hope (2019)

=== Extended plays ===
- What This World Needs (2014)
- Carolina Christmas (2017)

=== Singles ===
- Could've Been a Country Song (2018)
- Too Wrapped up in You (2019)
- If It Wasn't for the Storms (2020)
- My Christmas Lights (2020)
- Weightless (2021)
- Have Yourself a Merry Little Christmas (2021)
- All the Night We Need (2022)
- Silent Night (2022)
- The Day (2023)
- Picket Fence (2023)
- Hometown Never Leave Me (2024)

== Awards, honors, and recognitions ==
=== Awards ===
Taylon Hope has won four Josie Awards throughout her career. She has also won two Inspirational Country Music awards, both in 2016.

| Year | Award | Category | Nominee(s) | Result | Ref. |
|---|---|---|---|---|---|
| 2016 | Inspirational Country Music Awards | Youth in Music | Taylon Hope | Won | Gerald Murray Music |
| 2016 | Inspirational Country Music Awards | New Artist of the Year | Taylon Hope | Won | Gerald Murray Music |
| 2016 | Josie Music Awards | Junior Category Vocalist | Taylon Hope | Won | Watauga Democrat |
| 2017 | Josie Music Awards | Junior Category Vocalist | Taylon Hope | Won | Watauga Democrat |
| 2018 | Josie Music Awards | Young Adult Entertainer of the Year | Taylon Hope | Won | Watauga Democrat |
| 2019 | Josie Music Awards | Young Adult Entertainer of the Year | Taylon Hope | Won | Watauga Democrat |

=== Honors ===
- Shared the Ryman Auditorium stage with Dolly Parton, Lee Greenwood, Lonestar, Collin Raye, T. G. Sheppard, Drew Baldridge, and Abby Anderson, at the Gift of Music concert in January 2020

=== Recognition ===
- 20 to Watch in 2020 by Women of Country
- She Wolf Radio's Artists of the Year in 2020
- Commenting on Hope's Could've Been a Country Song, MusicRow critic Robert K. Oermann said: “She’s still a teen, but she sure knows her way around a song. This soaring rocker depicts rural romance with verve and panache. The nicely crafted lyric is married to a propulsive production that fires on all cylinders. Very promising.”
