= Vaughan House (Little Rock, Arkansas) =

Historic house in Arkansas, United States

- U.S. National Register of Historic Places
- U.S. Historic district – Contributing property
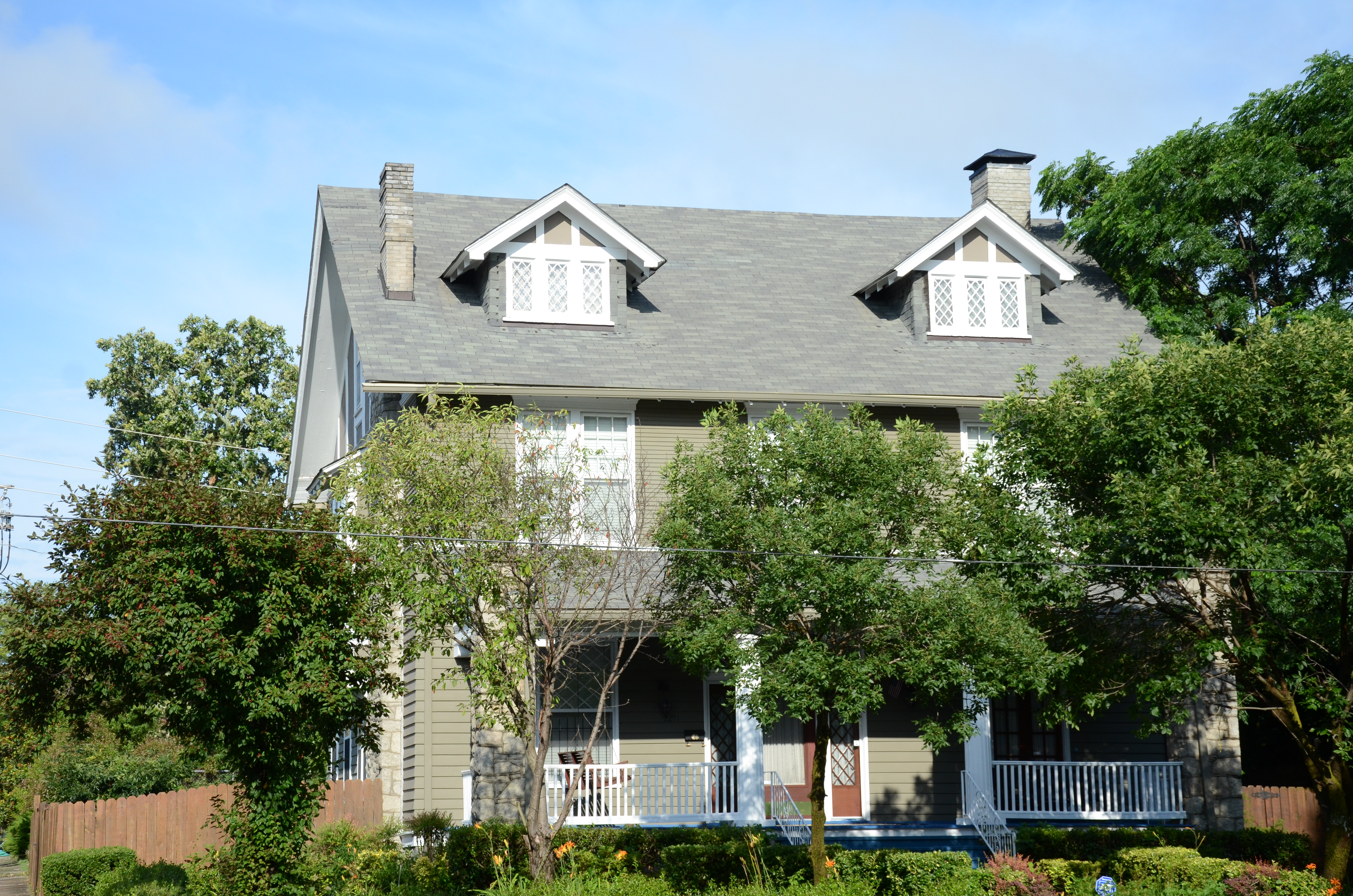

- Location within Arkansas Location within the United States
- Location: 2201 Broadway, Little Rock, Arkansas
- Coordinates: 34°43′36″N 92°16′41″W
- Area: less than one acre
- Built: 1910
- Architect: Charles L. Thompson
- Architectural style: Colonial Revival
- Part of: Governor's Mansion Historic District (ID78000620)
- MPS: Thompson, Charles L., Design Collection TR
- NRHP reference No.: 82000934

Significant dates
- Added to NRHP: December 22, 1982
- Designated CP: September 13, 1978

The Vaughan House is a historic house at 2201 Broadway in central Little Rock, Arkansas. It is a 2 1/2-story wood-frame structure, with a gabled roof, clapboard siding, and a high brick foundation. A single-story porch extends across its front, supported by square posts set on stone piers. Gabled dormers in the roof feature false half-timbering above the windows. Most of the building's windows are diamond-paned casement windows in the Craftsman style. The house was built about 1910 to a design by the noted Arkansas architect Charles L. Thompson.

The house was listed on the National Register of Historic Places in 1982.

== See also ==
- National Register of Historic Places listings in Little Rock, Arkansas
