= Vaughn House (Little Rock, Arkansas) =

Historic house in Arkansas, United States

- U.S. National Register of Historic Places
- U.S. Historic district – Contributing property
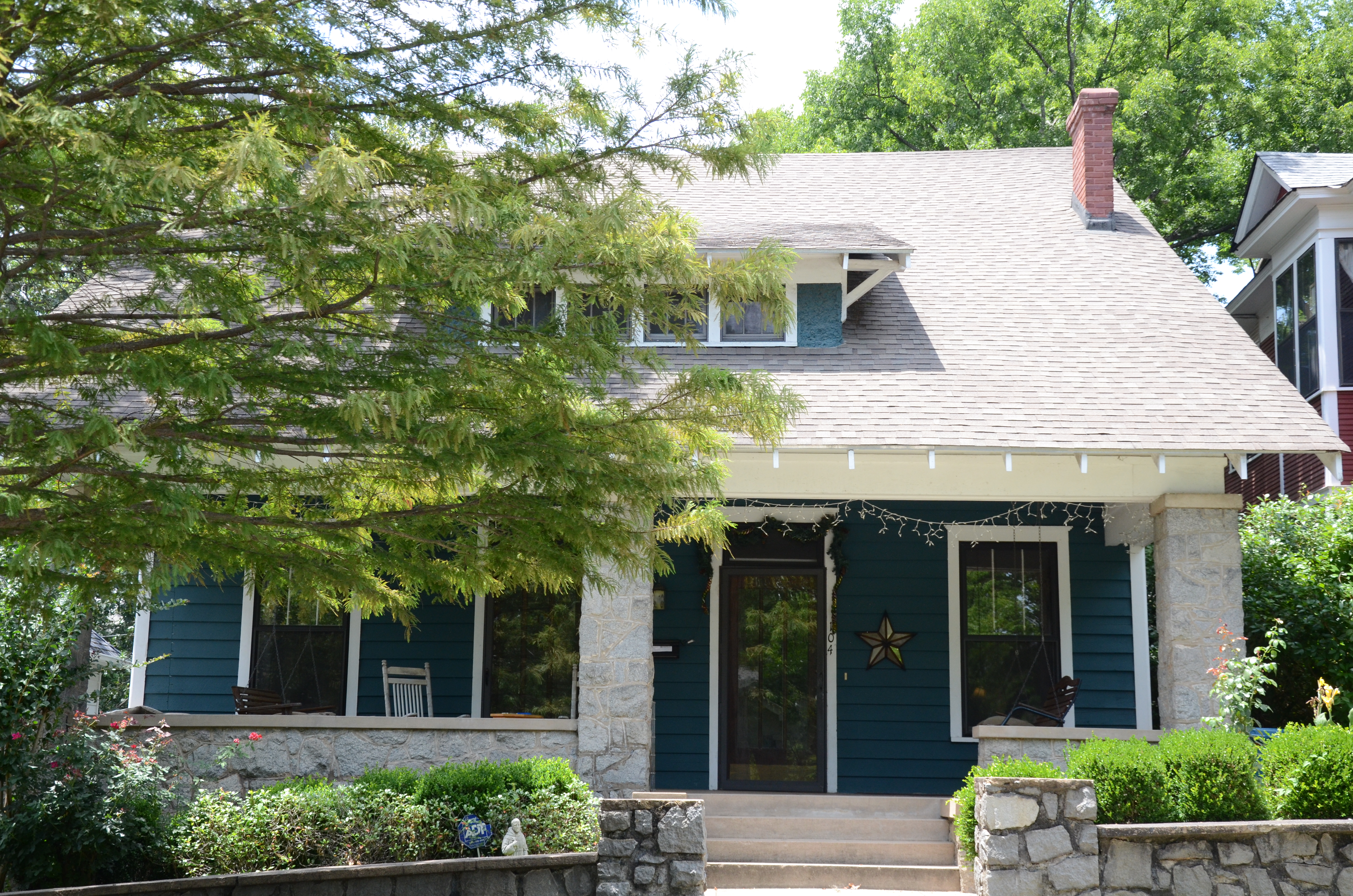

- Location within Arkansas Location within the United States
- Location: 104 Rosetta, Little Rock, Arkansas
- Coordinates: 34°44′59″N 92°18′31″W
- Area: less than one acre
- Built: 1914
- Architectural style: Bungalow/craftsman
- Part of: Stifft Station Historic District (ID06000941)
- NRHP reference No.: 99000226

Significant dates
- Added to NRHP: February 18, 1999
- Designated CP: October 18, 2006

The Vaughn House is a historic house at 104 Rosetta Street in Little Rock, Arkansas. It is a 1 1/2-story wood-frame structure, with a gabled roof and an exterior of clapboard and stuccoed half-timbering. The roof eave is lined with large Craftsman brackets, and the roof extends over the front porch, showing rafter ends, and supported by stone piers. Built in 1914, it is a well-preserved local example of Craftsman architecture.

The house was listed on the National Register of Historic Places in 1999.

== See also ==
- National Register of Historic Places listings in Little Rock, Arkansas
