= John Vaughan House =

Historic house in Ohio, United States

- U.S. National Register of Historic Places
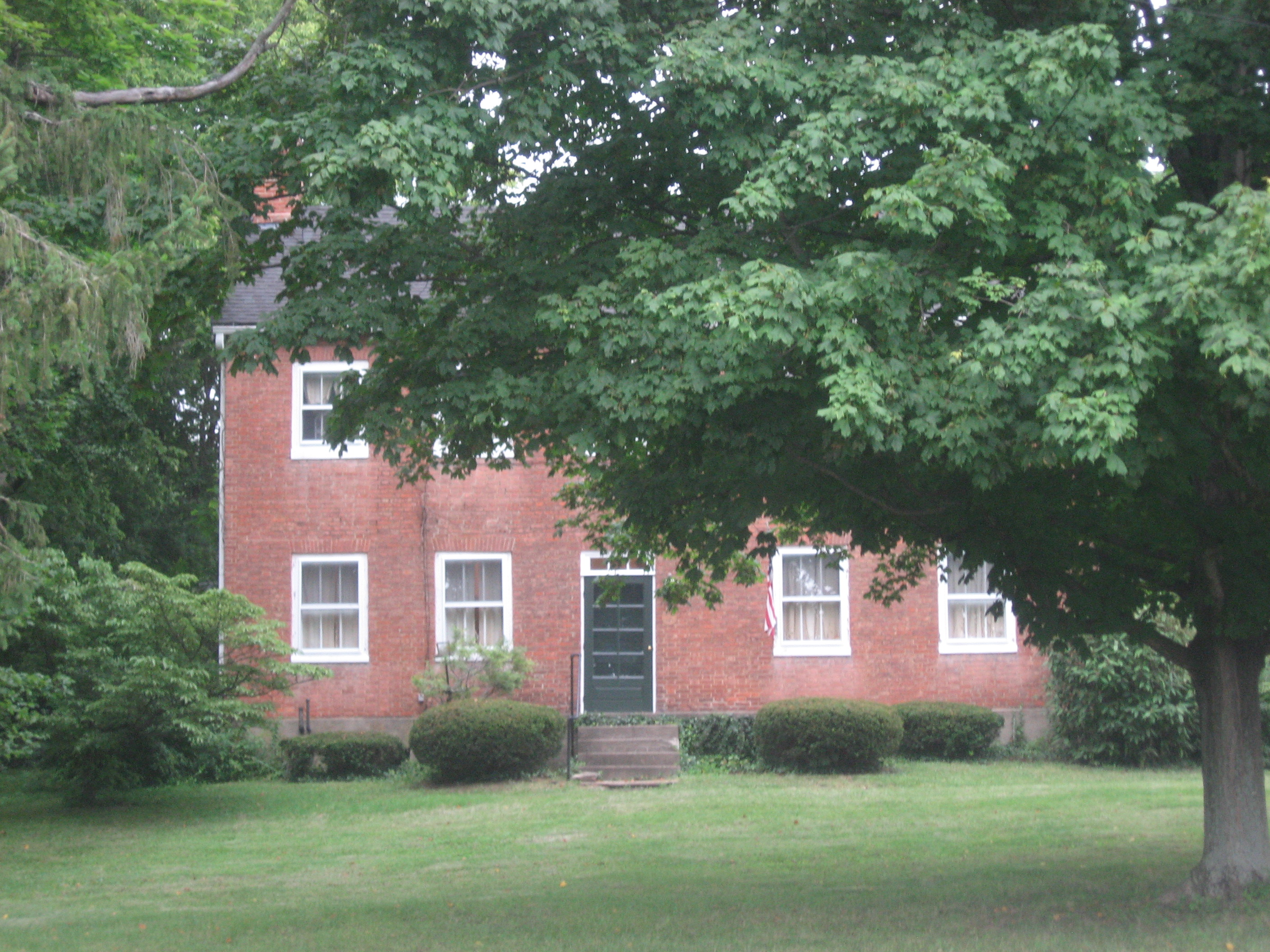
- Front of the house in 2013

- Location within Ohio Location within the United States
- Nearest city: Shandon, Ohio
- Coordinates: 39°19′36″N 84°42′36″W
- Built: 1814–1816
- Architectural style: Federal
- NRHP reference No.: 75001340
- Added to NRHP: 29 May 1975

John Vaughan House is a historic house near Shandon, Ohio.

== Description ==
The two and a half story brick building is an example of Federal architecture. A fieldstone foundation is covered with concrete on the south side, the main facade. This exposure has five bays with a slightly off center (westerly) entry. Above the door is a three light transom and the windows have gauged brick sills and lintels. On the first floor facade two three over three double hung sash flank the doorway on each side and smaller similar windows are on the second floor above each and the door. A corbeled cornice sits below brick laid on edge giving a saw tooth look. The east and west sides of the building each have interior chimneys rising above the center of the peak of the gables. East and west exposures have little fenestration. The east side has the initials JV centered in the gable wall. A one-story addition on the rear (north) side was added in the Twentieth Century. A screened porch joins the north of this addition to the original smokehouse. Original walnut woodwork remaining on the interior include window sills and reveals, the main stairway and wall paneling.

== History ==
The John Vaughan House was the first brick building in the Shandon area. Vaughan, a Welsh immigrant, built the house from 1814 to 1816, having made the first payment for the land the house occupies on November 8, 1801. This was the east half of section 25, Morgan Township, Butler County, Ohio. Vaughan and his wife Mary Jones come to Butler County with a group of Welsh settlers that year shortly after another group settled at Colerain Township. The family first built and lived in a log house on the property. To build the present structure a kiln was built and bricks were fired on the premises by James Shaw of Washington County who was brickyard foreman and superintendent of the mortar making. The brick for many of the homes built in the area were supplied by this brickyard and Vaughan's house served as a model for their construction. Vaughan had a hospitable reputation and paid for the passage of many of his fellow Welshmen who settled in the area. He sheltered twenty of them, who had not yet built their own homes, in his house in the winter of 1818–1819. The town church met in Vaughan's barn until a facility was built on land he donated most of. John Vaughan's son William was the first postmaster for Paddy's Run (later Shandon) and from 1831 to 1847 the house served as the Post Office. It was listed in the National Register of Historic Places on May 29, 1977.

== See also ==
- Brickwork
- Historic preservation
- History of Ohio
- National Register of Historic Places in Butler County, Ohio
