= John Hunter House (Franklin, Tennessee) =

Historic house in Tennessee, United States

- U.S. National Register of Historic Places
- Location within Tennessee Location within the United States
- Location: Old TN 96 at Carl Rd., Franklin, Tennessee
- Coordinates: 35°52′48″N 86°58′33″W
- Area: 2.8 acres (1.1 ha)
- Built: c. 1875, c. 1890 and c. 1910
- Architectural style: Italianate
- MPS: Williamson County MRA
- NRHP reference No.: 88000319
- Added to NRHP: April 13, 1988

The John Hunter House, also known as McCullough House, near Franklin, Tennessee is an Italianate style house that was built in 1875. It was listed on the National Register of Historic Places (NRHP) in 1988.

The NRHP eligibility of this property and others was covered in a 1988 study of Williamson County historical resources. The house was one of relatively few fine brick residences built in Williamson County, Tennessee, besides in Franklin, that were built from 1865 to 1937. Another one, also in Italianate style, is the Andrew Vaughn House, also NRHP-listed. Both "feature arched fenestration and ornate eaves" and had had few changes since, as of the 1988 study.

The house was built or has other significance in c. 1875, c. 1890, and c. 1910.

The NRHP listing was for an area of 2.8 acres (1.1 ha) with just one contributing building.
