= Owen-Cox House =

Historic house in Tennessee, United States

- U.S. National Register of Historic Places
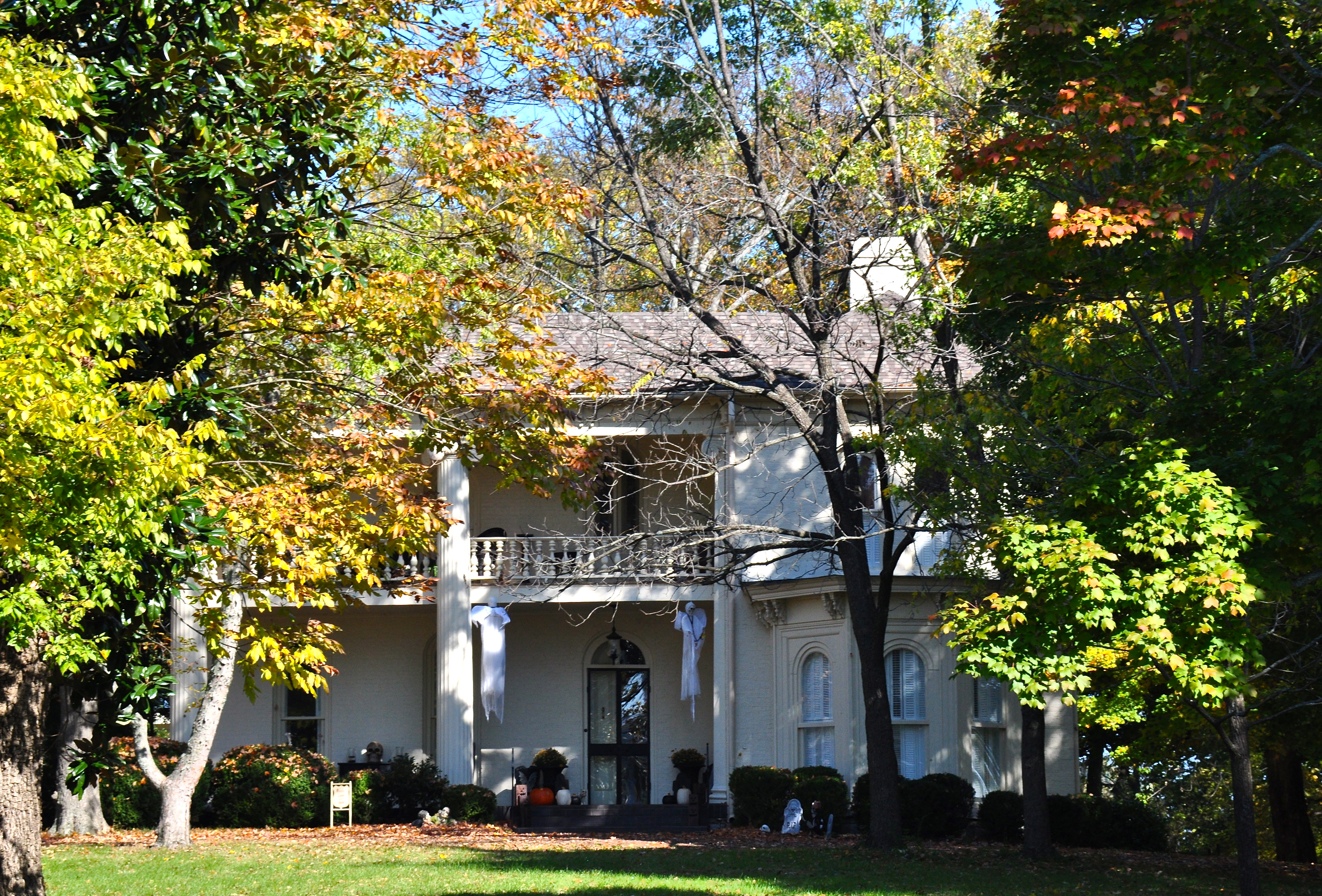
- Owen-Cox House, October 2014

- Location within Tennessee Location within the United States
- Location: Moores Ln. 1 mi. E of I-65, Brentwood, Tennessee
- Coordinates: 35°57′55″N 86°47′18″W
- Area: 5.2 acres (2.1 ha)
- Built: 1891 and 1899
- Architectural style: Classical Revival and Italianate
- MPS: Williamson County MRA
- NRHP reference No.: 88000327
- Added to NRHP: April 13, 1988

The Owen-Cox House is a property in Brentwood, Tennessee that was listed on the National Register of Historic Places in 1988. The property is also known as Maplelawn.

It was built or has other significance in 1891 and 1899. It includes Classical Revival and Italianate architecture. When listed the property included one contributing building and four non-contributing structures, on an area of 5.2 acres (2.1 ha).

The Owen-Cox House "was originally an earlier one-story brick residence but was remodeled into the Italianate style ca. 1875. The house was again remodeled in the early 1900s with added metal columns."

The house "is significant for its association with Nicholas N. Cox who served in the U.S. Congress from 1891 until 1901. Cox was the most prominent county politician in the late 19th century and was an able lawyer and legislator."

The house was built by William Owen, using bricks made by slaves. Reportedly bought by Nicholas Cox under the carpetbagger government. Remodeled by his son, Carter Cox. Children of William Owen that may have been born in the house - John Owen, Nathan Owen II 1st TN CSA, Lucinda Owen (married Joseph E. Loggins, CSA, buried nearby), Harris Owen and Ira Owen. A family home of my line that well precedes current ownership.

== See also ==
- Cox House (Franklin, Tennessee), also NRHP-listed in Williamson County
