= Henry Pointer House =

Historic house in Tennessee, United States

- Formerly listed on the U.S. National Register of Historic Places
- Location: US 31 S of Thompsons Station, Tennessee
- Area: 2 acres (0.81 ha)
- Built: c.1885
- Architectural style: Italianate
- MPS: Williamson County MRA
- NRHP reference No.: 88000332
- Removed from NRHP: April 4, 2006

Henry Pointer House is a building in Thompsons Station, Tennessee that was listed on the National Register of Historic Places. It was removed from the National Register in 2006, when it was relocated.

It was built or has other significance as of c.1885. It includes Italianate architecture. When listed the property included one contributing building, two non-contributing buildings, two non-contributing structures, on an area of 2 acres (0.81 ha).

The property was covered in a 1988 study of Williamson County historical resources.
