= Greenhouse (disambiguation) =

A greenhouse is an indoor covered place where plants are grown and cultivated. It may also refer to:

- Greenhouse effect, the atmospheric phenomenon causing planetary warming
- Greenhouse and icehouse Earth, periods when the greenhouse effect is dominant or absent
- Greenhouse effect (United States Supreme Court), postulated effect whereby conservative Supreme Court Justices drift liberal for favorable press
- Greenhouse debt, the measure to which an entity exceeds its permitted greenhouse footprint

== Name ==
- Greenhouse (surname)

== Music ==
- Greenhouse (Leo Kottke album), an album by Leo Kottke released in 1973
- Greenhouse (Brotherhood of Man album), a 1997 album by Brotherhood of Man
- Greenhouse (Yellowjackets album), 1991
- Greenhouse Music, a record label
- Greenhouse Studios, a music recording facility in Vancouver, Canada
- Greenhouse (music group), also known as Greenhouse Effect, an American hip hop duo

== Other ==
- Operation Greenhouse, a 1951 series of nuclear tests
- Greenhouse (automotive), an automotive term
- Greenhouse Software, a technology company that provides a recruiting software as a service
- Greenhouse (restaurant), in Perth, Western Australia
- The Greenhouse (novel), a novel by Susan Hillmore
- Nash Block, also known as The Greenhouse, a building in Omaha, Nebraska
- The Greenhouse (TV series), an Israeli television series
- Greenhouse (Leeds), a block of flats in Beeston, Leeds

== See also ==
- Green House (disambiguation)
- Greene House (disambiguation)
- Hothouse (disambiguation)
- Passive daytime radiative cooling, method of reducing temperature using an inverse greenhouse effect
