= Charles Jenkinson =

Charles Jenkinson may refer to:

- Charles Jenkinson, 1st Earl of Liverpool (1727–1808), British statesman
- Charles Jenkinson, 3rd Earl of Liverpool (1784–1851), British politician
- Sir Charles Jenkinson, 10th Baronet, MP for Dover, 1806–1818
- Charles Moffatt Jenkinson (1865-1954), Australian politician
- Charles Jenkinson (priest) (1877-1949), Anglican clergyman and Labour Party social reformer
