= RAH Livett =

British architect

Richard Alfred Hardwick Livett, OBE (1898–1959), known as R.A.H. Livett, was an architect and pioneer of modernist social housing.

== Early life ==
Livett was born at 59 Sistova Road, Balham, London in early 1898, the only son of undertaker, valuer and later Building Foreman, Harry Clayton Livett (1863–1936) and his wife, Ada (née Hardwick), who had married in Edmonton in 1893. He trained as an architect at the Architectural Association in London before working for a number of private firms; for while, he was employed as an assistant by Paul and Michael Waterhouse. He later served as Chief Housing Assistant to TC Howitt in Nottingham.

In June 1928, he married Violet Lauretta Victoria Bennett (1900–1982) in Barnet, London. They had at least two children, David Buteux Livett (1929–2003) and Jill H Livett (b. 1933).

== Career ==
Around 1930, he moved to Manchester and became Deputy Housing Director to Leonard Heywood. Here he designed the initial part of Wythenshawe, the Dewsbury Estate and Manchester's first major post-war housing block, the modernist Kennet House in Cheetham (1933–1935). Since demolished, the flat-roofed block was nicknamed the "ocean liner". It consisted of 181 flats and was built at a cost of £83,000.

In February 1934, he was appointed, by the incoming Labour administration, as Housing Director for Leeds; his annual salary began at £700 and eventually rose to £1,000. His selection for the post may have been assisted by the Revd Charles Jenkinson who remarked that “When we obtained Mr Livett’s services we struck oil”. Jenkinson (1887–1949), was Leeds’s innovative chairman of the Housing Committee from 1933 to 1936. Both men were keen to provide high-density housing for the working classes and travelled Europe looking for designs to emulate.

In 1934 Livett designed the Quarry Hill Estate (demolished in 1978), modelled on the Karl Marx-Hof in Vienna. This major estate, built at a cost of over £500,000, consisted of six to eight storey blocks housing 938 flats over 29 acres. Like its European precursors, it contained communal open ground and amenities including a nursery, shops and a day centre. It was built using the French Mopin concrete building method used on the Cité de la Muette at Drancy. Livett's flats had lifts, and utilised the Garchey sink-based waste disposal system. His department often used innovative forms of concrete construction, some of which he invented and patented.

In 1936, he appointed George Clark Robb (1903–1980), from Edinburgh Council, as his Senior Architectural Assistant. Robb designed housing, and Shaftesbury House (1936), a hostel for over 300 men and 100 women in Beeston, now remodelled by Citu as the Greenhouse. Another architect who worked for Livett was C.W. Brown, who designed the Bronte House women's hostel.

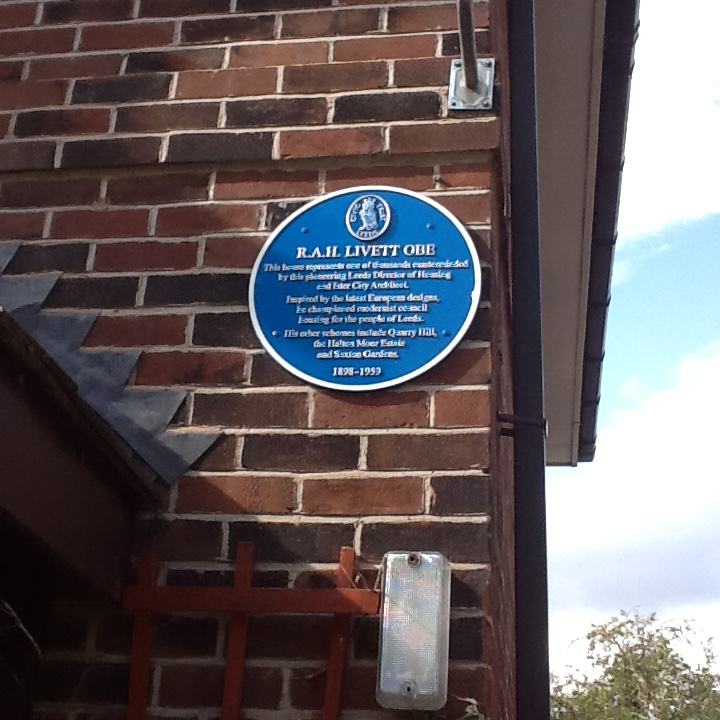
Blue Plaque for Livett on Gipton Estate, 2019

Levitt was responsible for the Gipton Estate (1934–1935), containing almost 3,500 dwellings. He designed the Halton Moor Estate, more traditional council housing, in February 1938. Other housing developments completed before the war include the Sandford House Estate and Sweet Street, a development of 366 flats. March Lane, a development of over 11 acres, was suspended on the outbreak of war.

After the war, in January 1948, Livett was appointed Leeds's City Architect. He remodelled York Road Library (1949) alongside the Civic Theatre (1949). In 1953, he designed Skelton Grange Power Station, and in the following year the Central Ambulance Station in Leeds.

He designed several schools including Halton Moor Primary School (1948), Parklands/Seacroft Primary School (1950) and Allerton Grange Secondary Modern School in Talbot Avenue (1955). Towards the end of his career, he designed the College of Technology, Art and Commerce (1956) and the Temple Moore Grammar School (1957) in conjunction with Yorke, Rosenburg & Mardall.

In 1939, work began on the Saxton Gardens development, but it was delayed by the war. Construction started again in 1954 with a slab block modelled on Le Corbusier's Unité d'Habitation in Marseilles. The development contained 471 flats in blocks of five to ten storeys. Despite a view that many of Leeds citizens favoured houses over flats, Livett "insisted that the multi-storey block was the only way forward if the cities serious housing policies were to be met." His Ireland Wood housing estate was awarded a Ministry Housing medal in 1949.

By the late 1950s, Livett was designing 10 storey point blocks at Clayton Court (1958) and 8 storey blocks at Carlton Towers in the Camp Road redevelopment (1959).

He was awarded an OBE for his wartime work in Leeds. On 20 September 1959 he died suddenly in Leeds aged 61. His acting replacement was Deputy City Architect PB Haswell, and thereafter J.R. Sheridan-Shedden was appointed City Architect in 1959.
