= Hothouse =

Hothouse or Hot House or Hot house may refer to:

- A heated greenhouse

== Entertainment ==
=== Music ===
- Hot House (composition), a jazz standard written by Tadd Dameron

==== Albums ====
- Hot House (Walter Bishop Jr. album), 1979
- Hot House (Gary Burton and Chick Corea album), 2012
- Hot House (Bruce Hornsby album), 1995
- Hot House (Steve Lacy album), 1991
- Hot House (Arturo Sandoval album), 1998

==== Songs ====
- Hothouse (78violet song), 2013
- Hothouse (Collette song), 1989
- Hot House (The Sound song), 1982

=== Fiction, drama, poetry ===
- Hothouse (audio drama), a 2009 Doctor Who audio play
- Hothouse (novel), a 1962 fantasy/science fiction novel by Brian Aldiss
- The Hothouse, a 1958 play by Harold Pinter
- Hothouses, a book of poetry by Maurice Maeterlinck
- Hothouse (Transformers), a fictional character

=== Television ===
- Hothouse (TV series), a 1988 American television series
- The Hothouse, a 2003 British television series
- The Hothouse, a 2007 New Zealand television series

== Other ==
- Hothouse, Georgia, a community in the United States
- HotHouse (jazz club), a defunct jazz club in Chicago
- Hot House (band), a British soul band formed in 1987 featuring Heather Small
- Hot House Entertainment, a gay pornography studio
- HotHouse Theatre, an Australian theatre company in Albury-Wodonga

== See also ==
- Hothousing, educational technique
- Hothouse flowers (disambiguation)
- Greenhouse (disambiguation)
