= Hothouse, Georgia =

Unincorporated community

Coordinates: 34°56′04″N 84°18′14″W

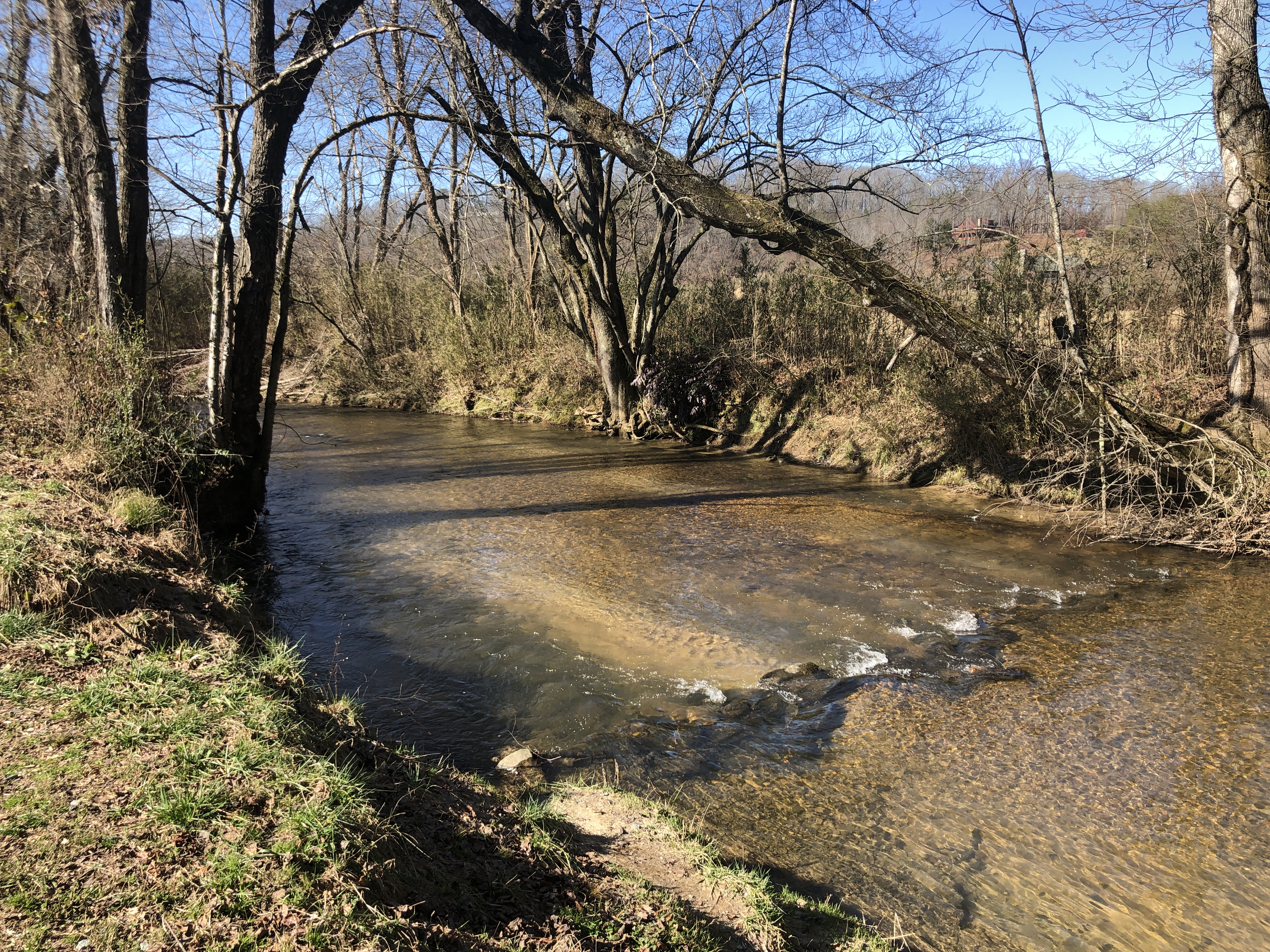
Hothouse Creek in Hothouse

Hothouse is an unincorporated community in Fannin County, in the U.S. state of Georgia.

== History ==
Prior to European colonization, the area that is now Hothouse was inhabited by the Cherokee people and other Indigenous peoples for thousands of years.

The community takes its name from nearby Hothouse Creek. An alternative spelling is "Hot House". A post office called Hot House was established in 1848, and remained in operation until 1913.
