= Susan Hillmore =

English author and painter

Susan Hillmore is an English author and painter living in Gloucestershire. She studied fine art at the Camberwell School of Art and has exhibited at the Royal Academy. She has also written two novels:

- The Greenhouse (1988) which was shortlisted for the Sunday Express Book of the Year
- Malaria (2000)
