= Greenhouse (Leeds) =

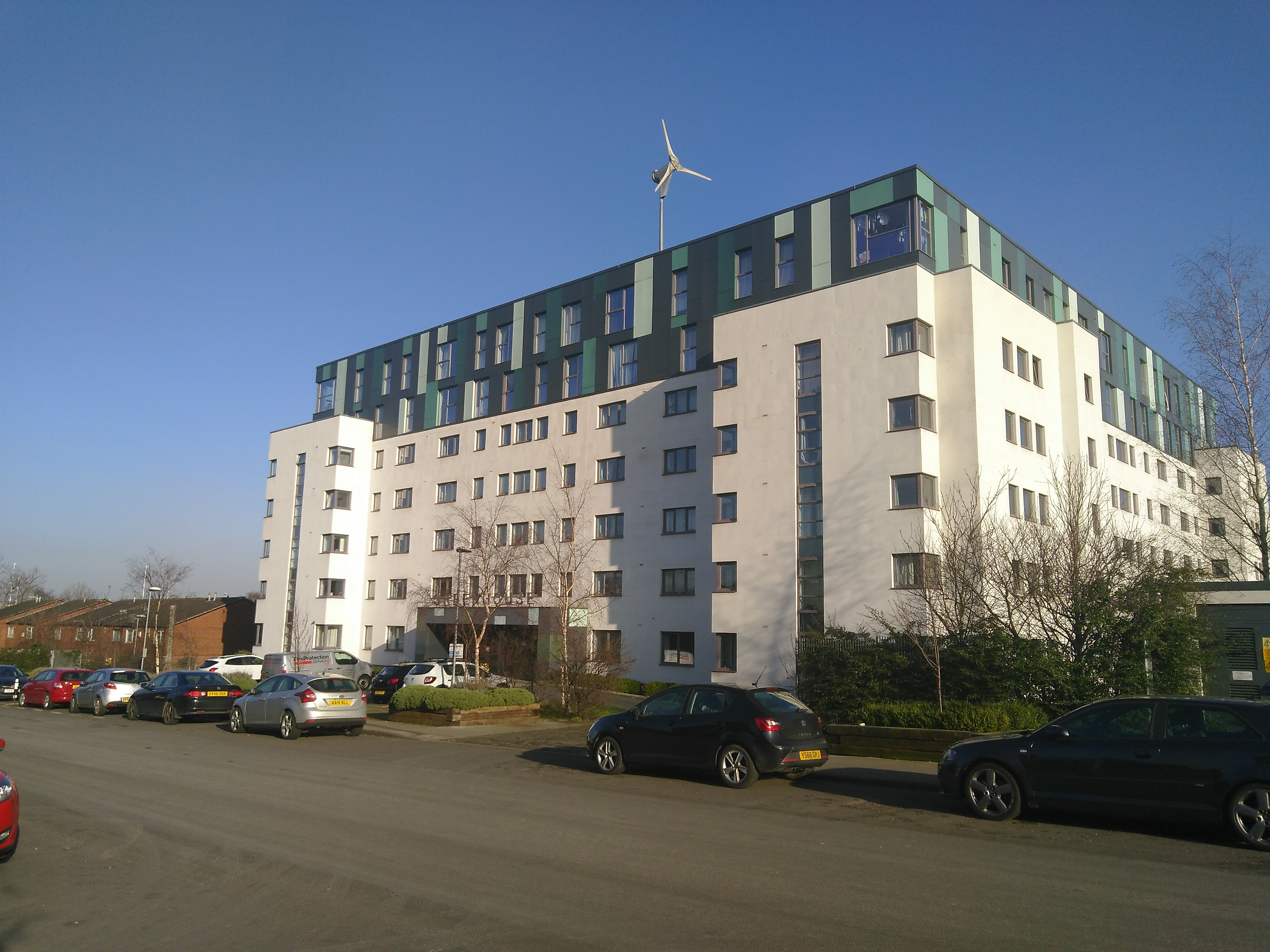
- Former names: Shaftesbury House
- Alternative names: The Greenhouse

General information
- Architectural style: Ecomodernism (formerly Art Deco)
- Location: Leeds, LS11; United Kingdom
- Coordinates: 53°46′53″N 01°33′07″W
- Opened: 15 December 1938
- Renovated: 1 October 2010
- Renovation cost: £12.5 million (construction cost); 26-27m (overall cost)
- Landlord: GRIF—Ground Rents Income Fund Plc

Technical details
- Floor count: 8 (7 habitable)
- Floor area: 12,623 m^{2} (135,870 sq ft)
- Lifts/elevators: 2

Design and construction
- Architect: R. A. H. Livett
- Developer: Leeds City Council
- Awards: yes

Renovating team
- Architects: West and Machell Architects
- Renovating firm: Citu
- Structural engineer: Thomasons
- Services engineer: Arup, Woods Environmental
- Quantity surveyor: Sum
- Main contractor: Clegg Construction

Website
- Greenhouse: Where Sustainability Lives and Works at the Wayback Machine (archived January 31, 2020)

Greenhouse is an eight-storey, mixed-use block of eco-flats in Beeston, Leeds. The building took its present form in 2010, after renovation of a 1938 development, Shaftesbury House. As Shaftesbury House, the building was noted for its technologically innovative, modernist housing of migrant workers. As Greenhouse, it has been noted for an approach to promoting ecological and social sustainability far ahead of most of the UK building industry.

== Shaftesbury House ==
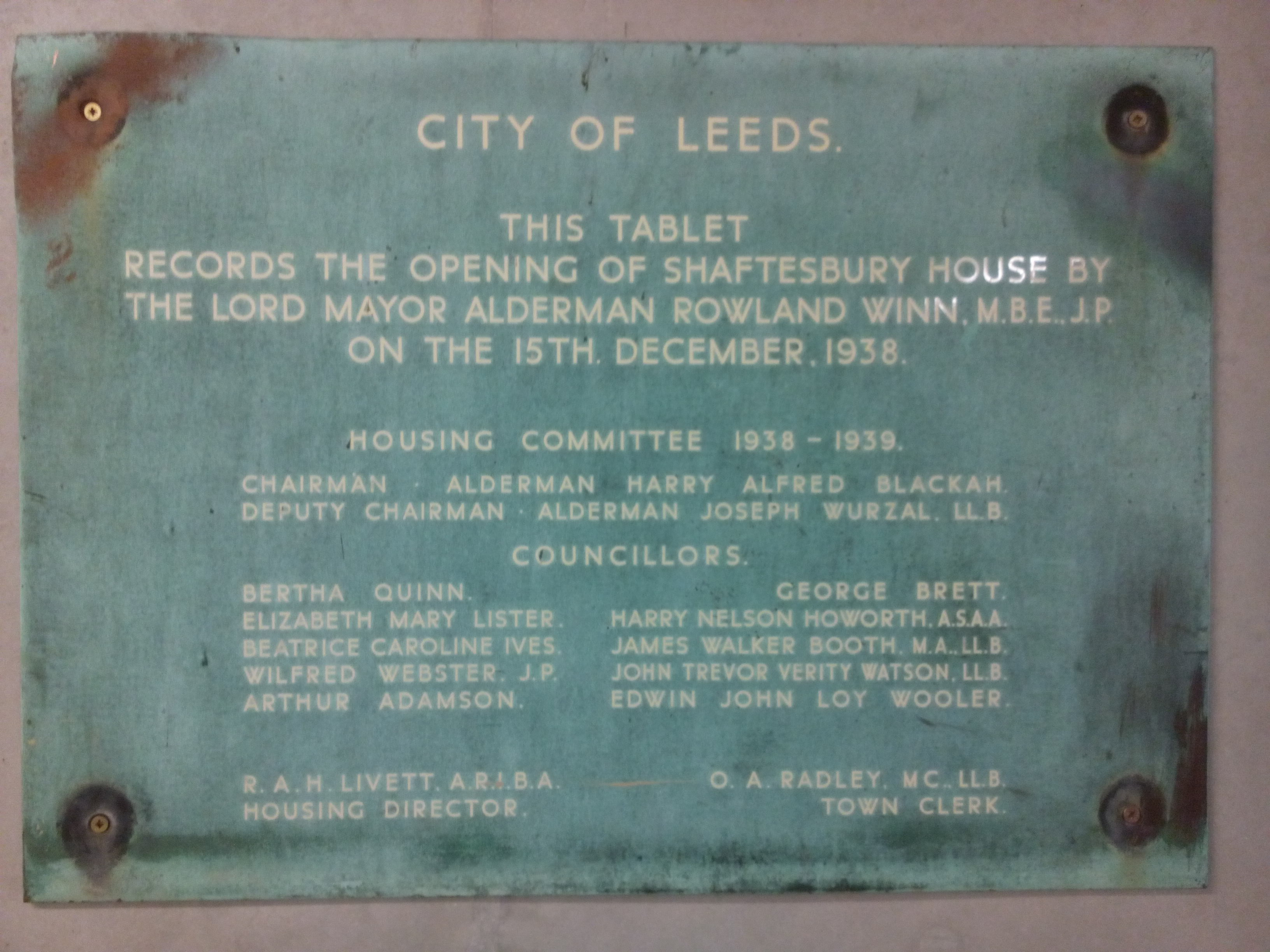
A plaque commemorating the opening of Shaftesbury House, Leeds, 15 December 1938.

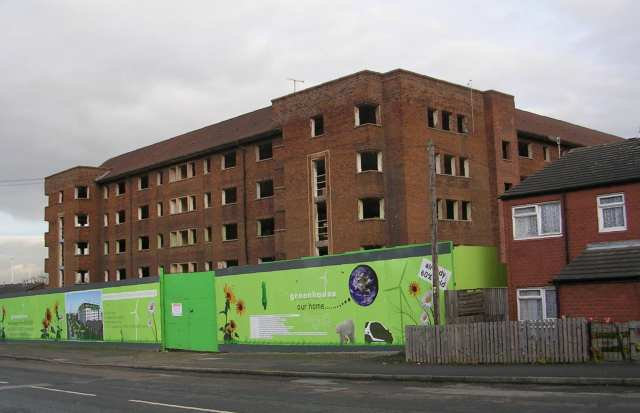
Shaftesbury House just prior to renovation.

In the wake of the Great Depression, Leeds was host to large numbers of migrant workers, who were frequently housed in appalling conditions. A programme of slum clearance, partly driven by the Housing Act 1930 and led particularly by Charles Jenkinson, followed, described by the historian Alison Ravetz as 'a heroic age of Leeds history' and fiercely opposed by the Conservative Party. Leeds City Council created the Leeds Model Lodging House in an old dyeworks in 1932, and then created the Shaftesbury House Municipal Hostel as its successor. Shaftesbury House was officially opened on 15 December 1938, opposite the old Holbeck workhouse. The building shared its name with Anthony Ashley-Cooper, 7th Earl of Shaftesbury, who introduced the Labouring Classes Lodging Houses Act 1851.

Art Deco in style, the building was an imposing, five-storey brick edifice, designed in 1936 by George Clark Robb, then senior architectural assistant to R. A. H. Livett. Square in plan, it contained four small courtyards, as many as 523 bedrooms, and numerous common spaces and shared facilities for laundry, washing, cooking, and dining. It was designed to house 308 men and 196 women (in separate areas with separate entrances). It had a different colour scheme for each floor, along with over 60 staff, a barber's shop and a cobblers. It has been seen as a major example of inter-war social housing.

However, by the 1960s–70s, the development had deteriorated. While in the 1960s it was still intended as a hostel only for workers, it served increasingly as a homeless shelter for the unemployed and long-term homeless, and allegedly even became known as the 'dustbin'. It was noted among Leeds's black population for the racism of its staff and inhabitants. It was finally closed and boarded up in November 1998.

== Redevelopment ==
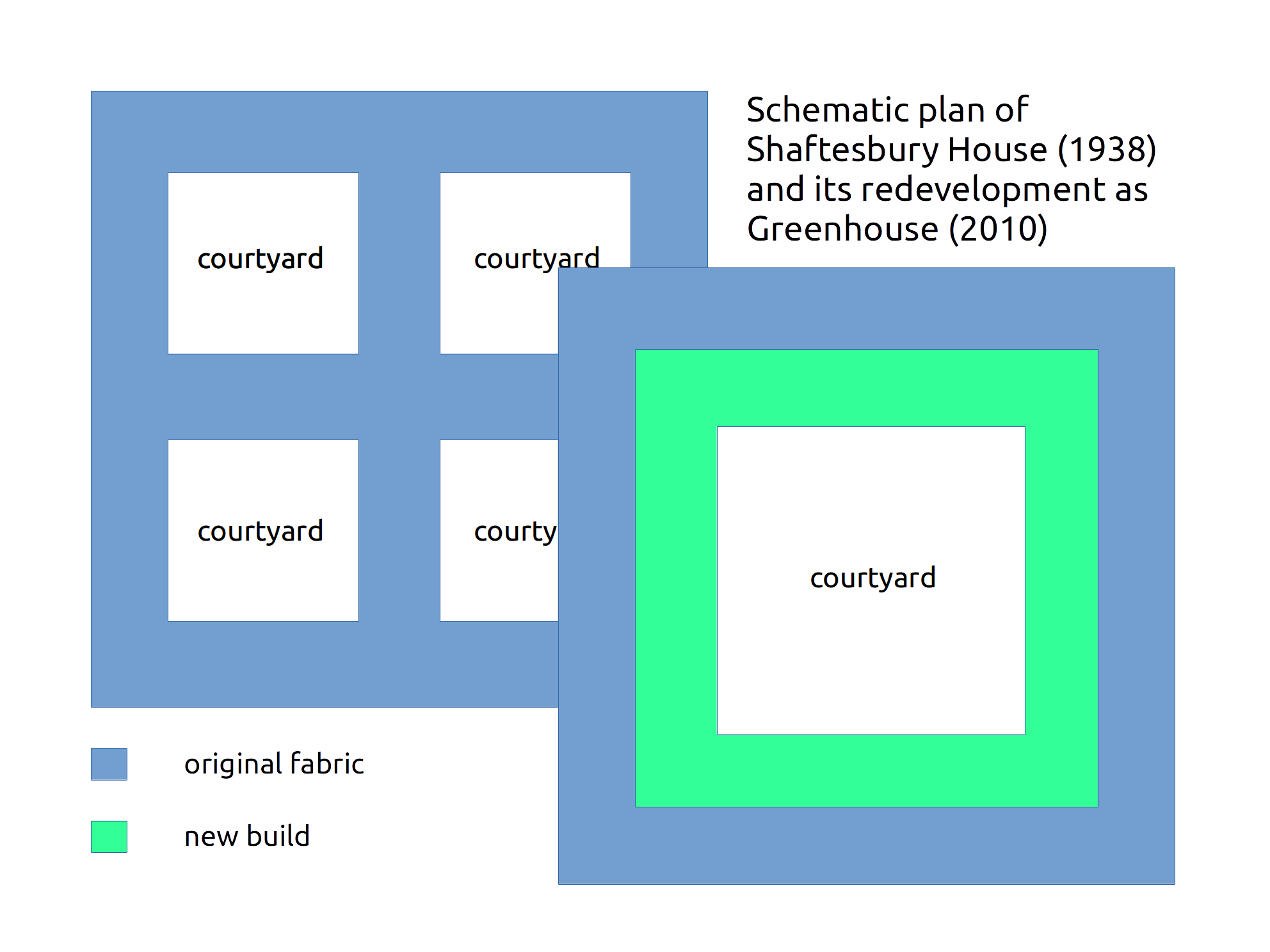
Plan (not to scale) of Shaftesbury House (1938) compared with Greenhouse (2010).

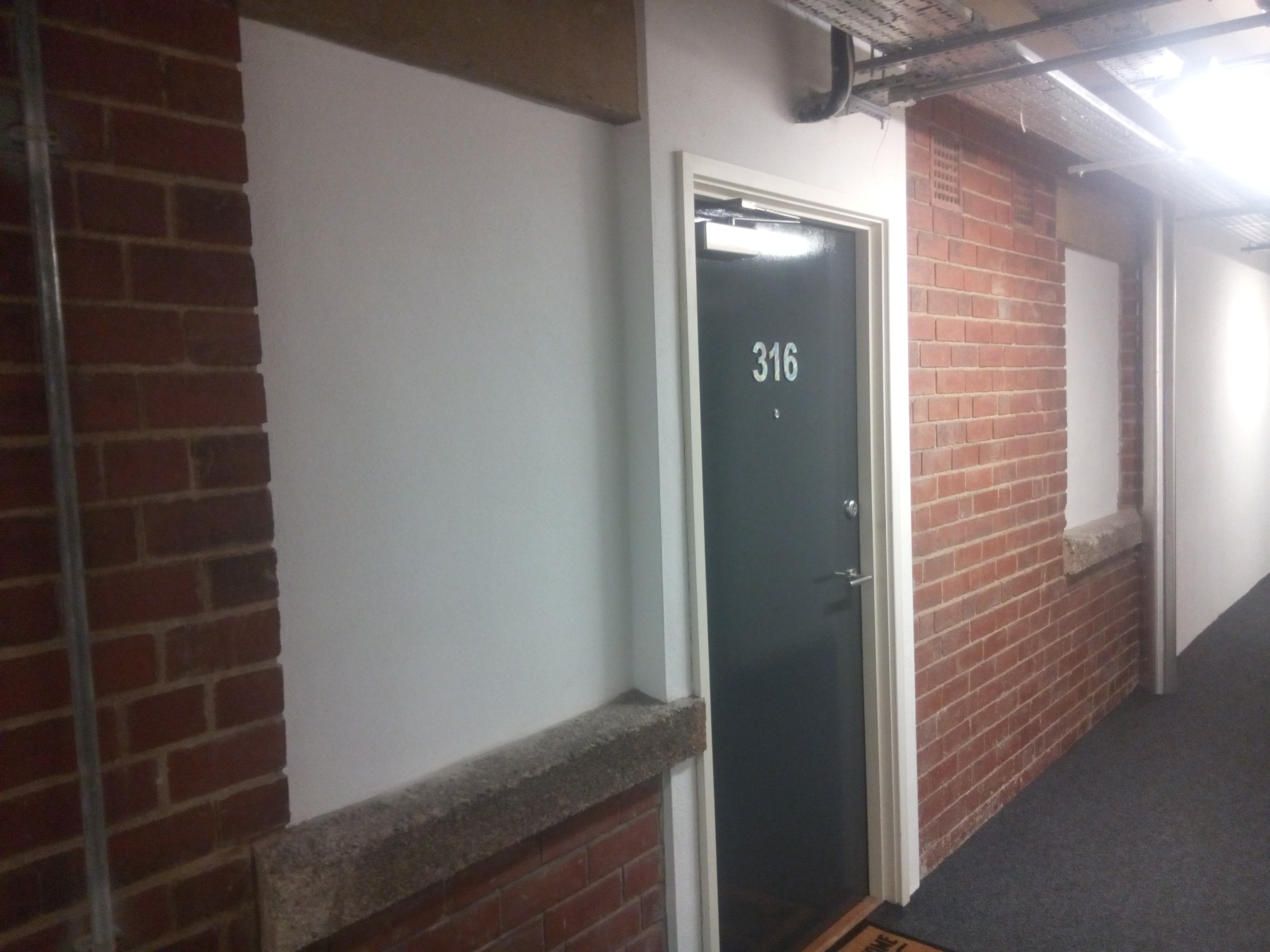
An interior corridor on floor 3, showing what was once an exterior wall facing into one of the building's four courtyards. The white squares were windows, and their ledges are still in situ.

The small Leeds developer Citu conceived a redevelopment of Shaftesbury Hourse in 2005. The developers' ethos for the building included a holistically conceived architecture and engineering system that focused on ecological and social sustainability and that promoted small, creative business and urban regeneration. The developers cited influence from Japanese design. Their emphasis, in line with ecomodernism, was on enabling more sustainable life without expecting residents consciously to make sacrifices.

Citu completed the purchase of the building in 2008, with finance coming prominently from the Co-operative Bank. The development was co-ordinated with Leeds City Council as part of the regeneration of the Holbeck/Beeston area of Leeds, though local residents were not uniformly enthusiastic about the development, and investors were nervous at its down-at-heel location.

Work on-site began in December 2008. The ground floor of Shaftesbury House was turned into car parking and plant rooms, and the cruciform inner wings demolished to create a single large courtyard. To achieve this, a JCB was craned into the existing courtyards, and some use was made of remote-controlled robots. The remaining fabric became an outer ring, entirely residential, while a new inner ring was built, with business space on the lower floors and residential space on the upper. Two entirely new floors were added on top of these. This took the size of the building from 80,000 to nearly 140,000 square feet. The framework and roof were completed during August 2009, and the building was finished in April 2010, at which time it had 172 one, two and three-bedroom eco-apartments, and about 15,000 square feet of office space. The building was officially opened by Hilary Benn MP on 1 October 2010.

Units went on sale, off plan, in April 2007, many people buying the flats as investments, with 130 being sold within a week. However, the redevelopment took place against the backdrop of the Great Recession, with Greenhouse being one of few large developments to be completed in Leeds after the housing market crashed. Not all original buyers followed through with their purchases, but most did, and 75% of homes had been sold by early 2011, which was reported as a significant achievement. But Citu temporarily diversified their use of unsold units to include a conference suite called Greenspace and an aparthotel business.

The developers expressly resisted what their director Chris Thompson called the "build it and leg it" model of development, and as of 2018 were still headquartered in the building, while the building's concierge, Jimmy, was recruited from among the builders who worked on the redevelopment. Commentators noted that, since sustainability plant took up 10% of the building's space, the developers had foregone some easy profits. Citu continued to manage the building until selling the freehold to Ground Rent Income Fund and handing over management to Braemar Estates in 2013.

== Sustainability features ==
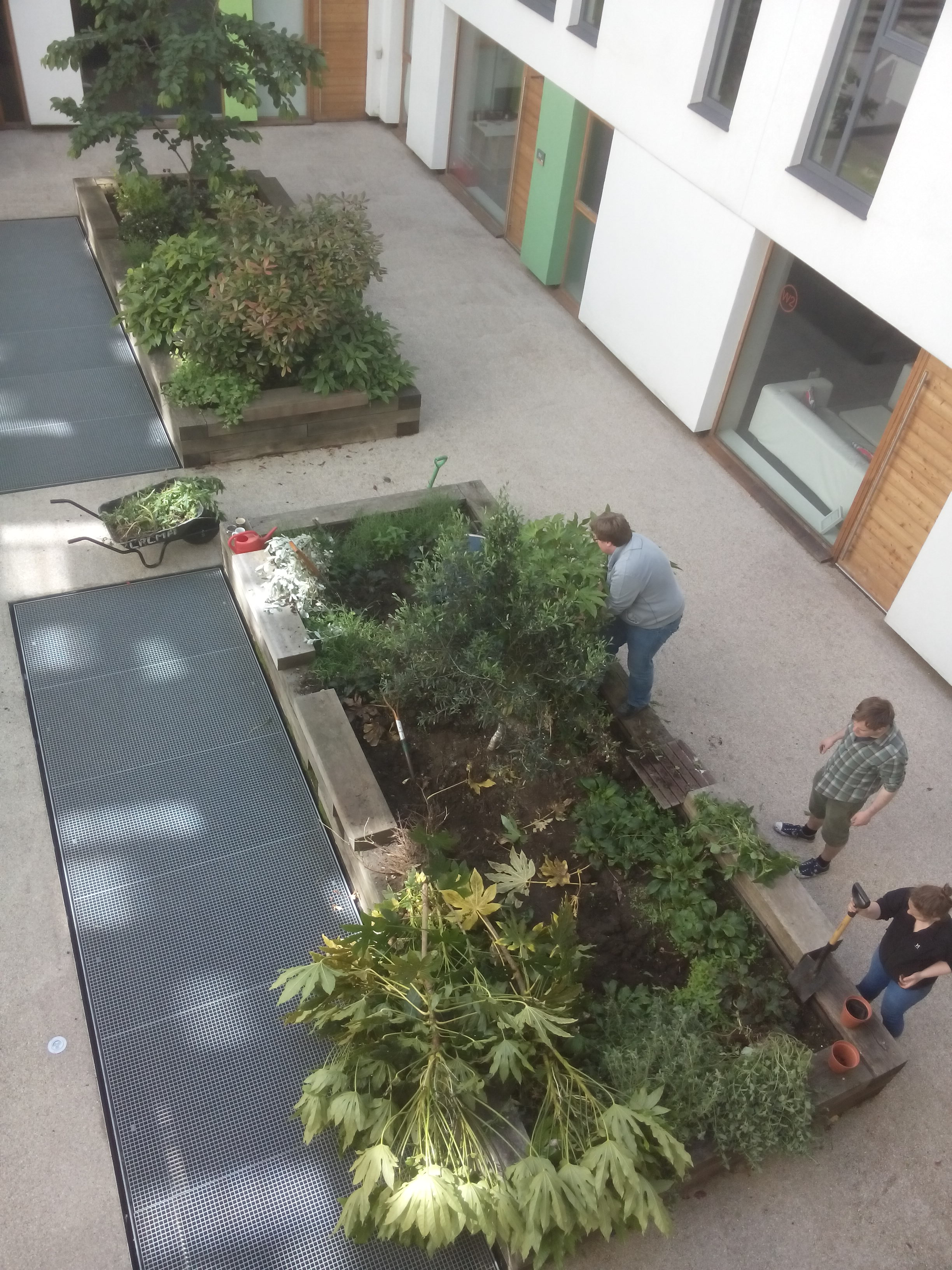
Denizens of Greenhouse tend the planters in the courtyard.

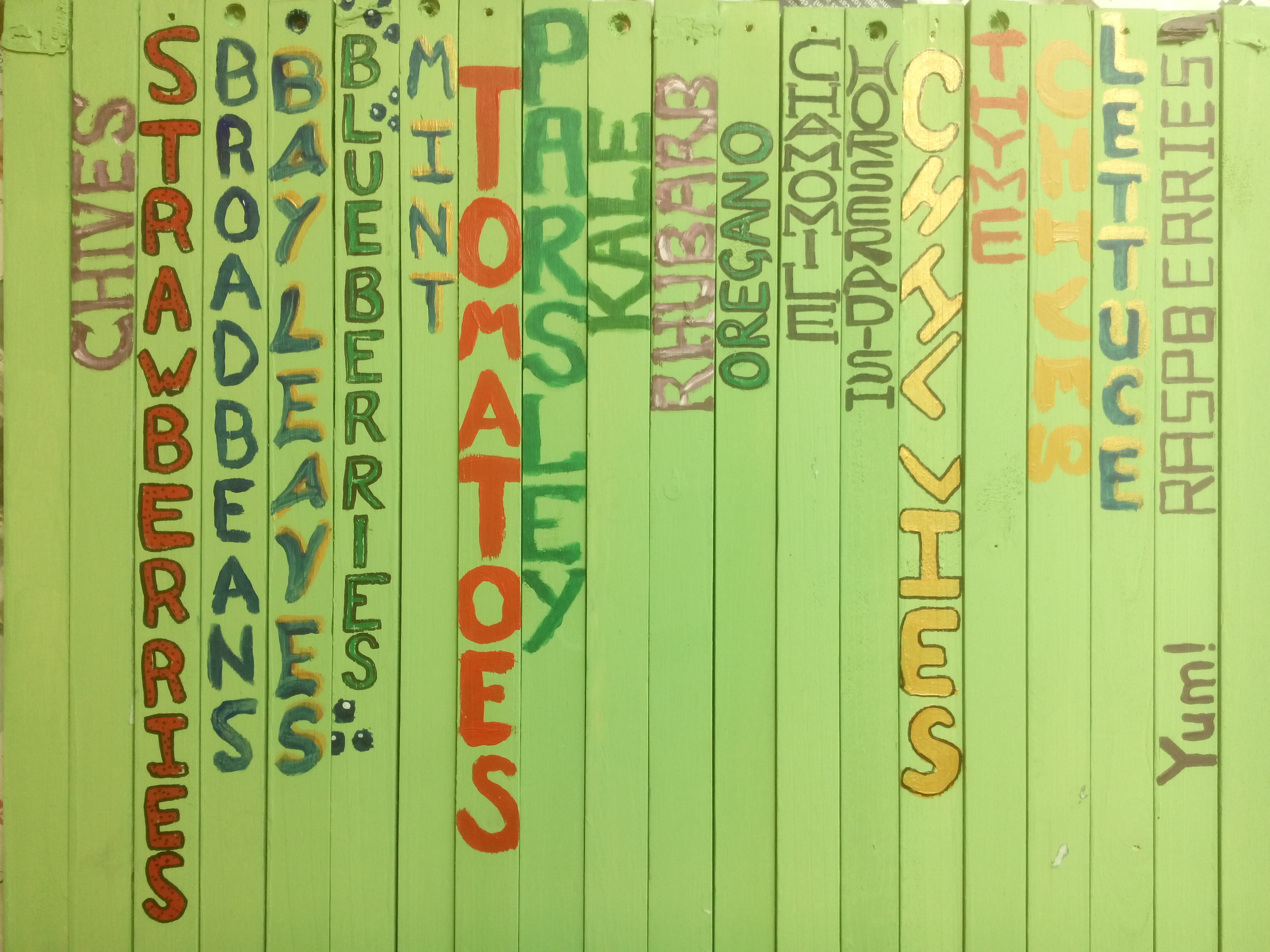
Handmade signs for edible food in Greenhouse planters.

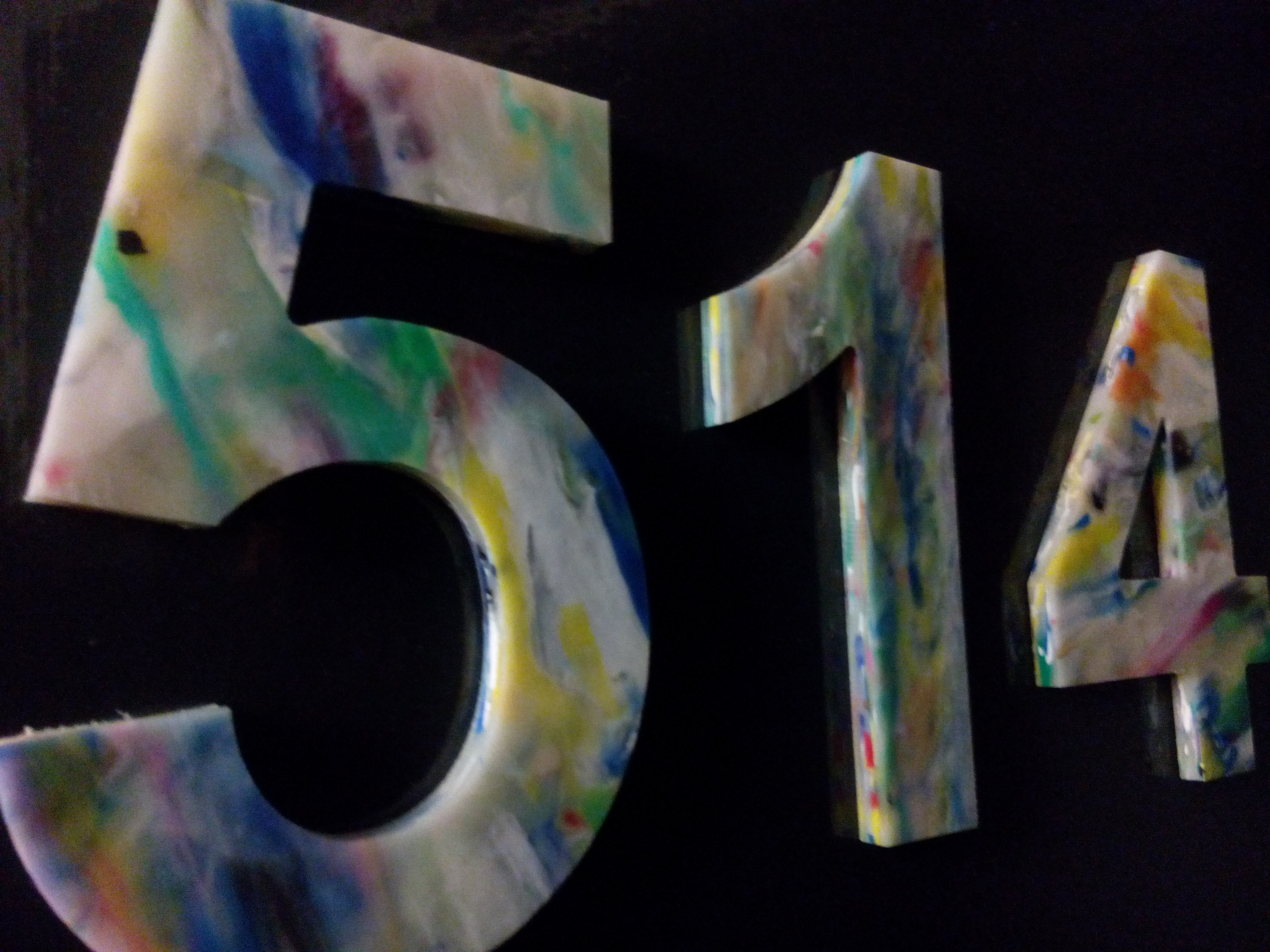
Flat number made from recycled plastic.

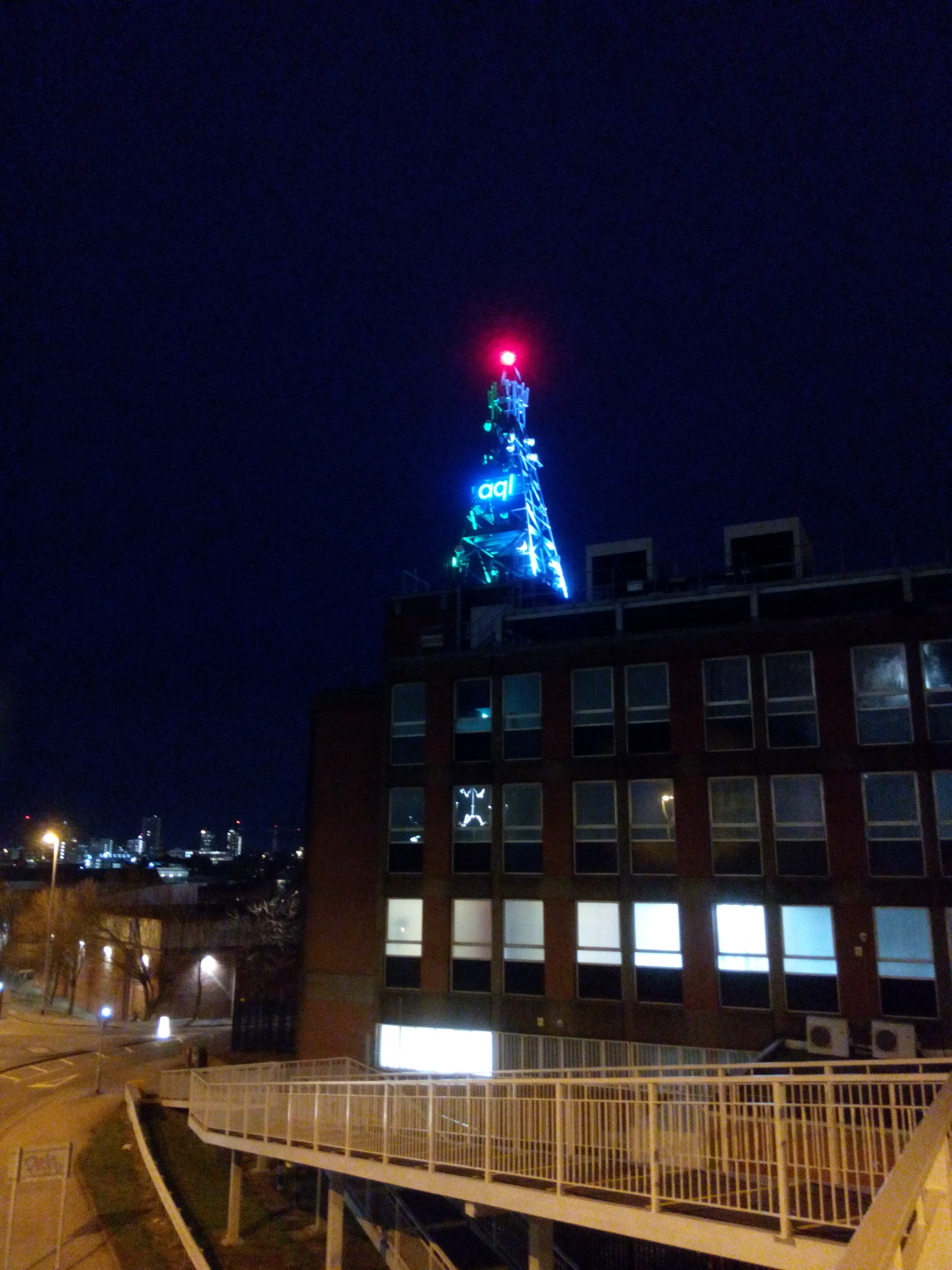
A mast in Hunslet, Leeds, broadcasting internet optically from AQL's Leeds office at the old Salem Chapel, Leeds to the Greenhouse block of flats.

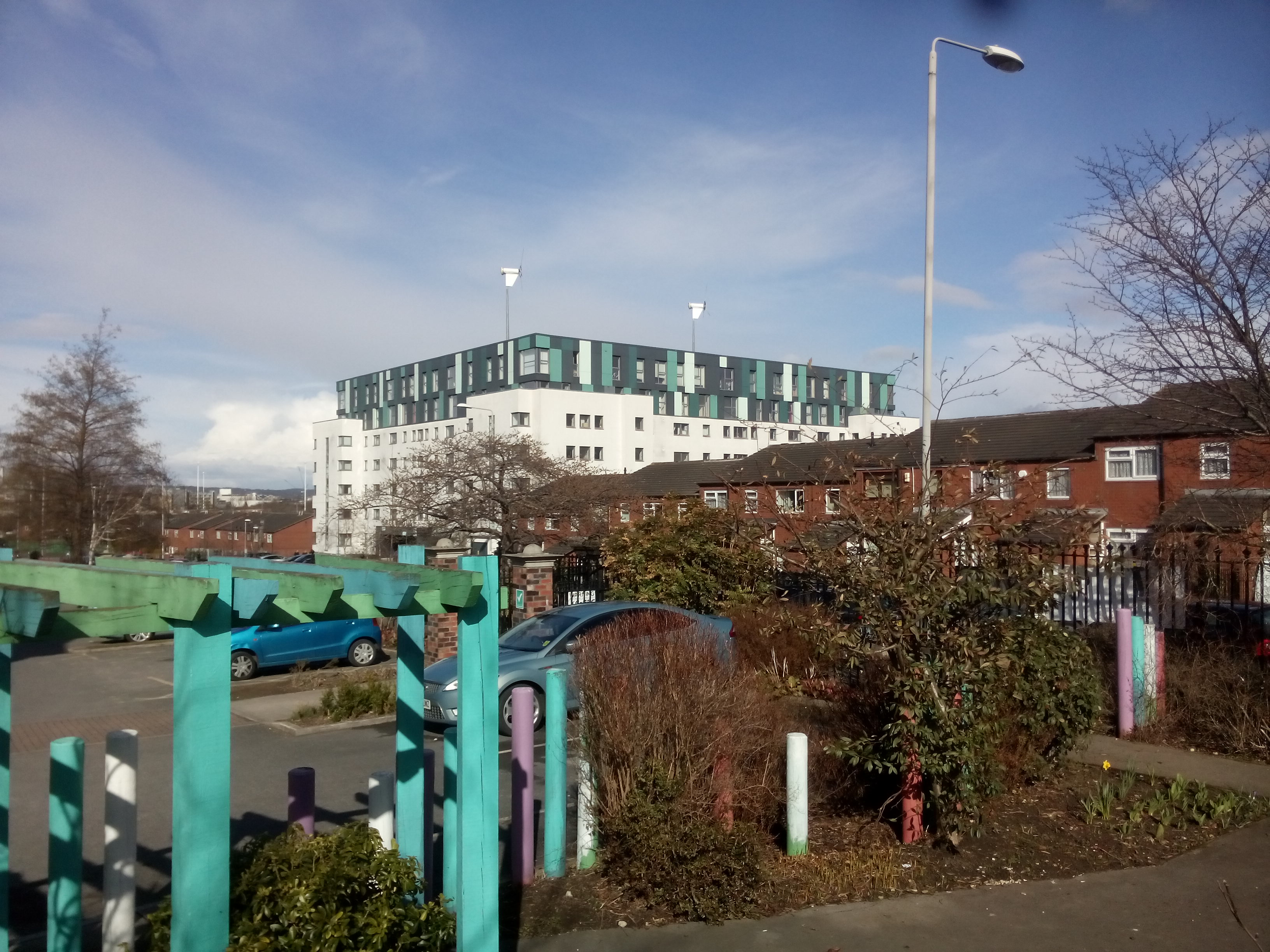
Greenhouse, Leeds, viewed from the garden of the Hillside Centre

The building has been ranked at Code for Sustainable Homes level 4 (out of 6); at the time this meant that it more than doubled the number of such units in the UK. A key aspect of its sustainability is that it involved renovating an existing structure. The following features were, at the time of the building's design, presented as innovative sustainability features.

=== Insulation, heating, and cooling ===
The building was built or, in the case of older parts, clad with high-performance insulation. According to the architects, the building achieved an airtight building envelope with the following U-values:

part of building	designed U-value (W/m2K)
walls	0.15
windows	1.32
floor	0.15
roof	0.10

Energy for heating was designed to come from solar water heating through 44 roof-mounted panels, then among the largest such schemes in the UK, and ground source heating via two eighty-metre boreholes enabling heat to be condensed from a natural reservoire beneath the building. An electric immersion-heating system was installed as a back-up.

Heating and cooling of rooms is achieved through a shared system based on heat exchange, integrated into the water heating and cooling system, and delivered via air-conditioning (meaning that units contain no boilers or radiators). Instead of being expelled into the atmosphere, waste heat from warm parts of the building (such as busy offices) can, for example, be transferred to cool parts of the building (such as north-facing residences), or used to warm water.

=== Electricity generation and conservation ===
- The building has two wind turbines contributing electricity to communal lighting and lifts.
- Corridor lighting is controlled by sensors.

=== Water consumption ===
- Taps aerate water, to reduce consumption by 25%.
- Rain water and grey water from washing is collected, filtered, and used to flush toilets.

=== Materials ===
- The concrete used is ground granulated blast-furnace slag, with a lower carbon footprint than conventional concrete.
- Floorboards and worksurfaces are made of bamboo, noted for durability and agricultural sustainability.
- Carpet underlay is made of recycled tyres.
- Numbers on the doors of units are made with recycled yoghurt pots.
- Planters inside the courtyard and in front of the building were made of reclaimed railway sleepers.

=== Community and behavioural change ===
- At the time of the building's completion, an IPTV system delivered real-time information about each unit's energy consumption, along with other information.
- The mixed-use development, combined with the heat exchange system, promotes efficient use of energy and a lively environment both during and outside office hours.
- Communal events were organised first by the developer and subsequently by a residents' committee established in 2012. Activities have at various times included a local pub quiz, bike club, gardening, an art exhibition, and board-games nights.
- The ground floor includes a freecycle area.
- Shared use of an allotment plot at Ladypit Lane Model Allotments.
- Shared use of an on-site gym.
- The development includes a cafe space, which has been occupied by various businesses, sometimes employing residents.

=== Features reported but not implemented ===
- Electric car club or on-site eco-friendly taxis.
- Collection of grey water from washing and reuse for clothes washing.
- Sixteen small wind turbines, and one large off-site turbine.
- Prevention of purchase of units by buy-to-let landlords.
- Shared umbrellas to encourage pedestrianism.

One resident interviewed by the Daily Telegraph noted that there had been technical problems with some of the features of the building, "but most residents accept that it comes with the territory of living with cutting-edge technology"; November 2020 saw the building seeking planning permission for the installation of an air-source heating system.

== Carbon footprint ==
At the concept stage, the building was widely touted as being "carbon negative", intended to generate more energy than it used. This was later tempered to "zero-carbon", nearly zero-carbon, or "self-sufficient". On completion of the building, the architects in fact estimated annual CO_{2} emissions for a typical flat of 0.5 tonnes, representing a 60 per cent overall increase in energy efficiency compared with an average UK property, though a resident later blogged real-life figures that suggested higher emissions. The carbon footprint of creating and redeveloping the building appears not to have been measured.

== Influence ==
The building has influenced subsequent work by the same developers, such as at Little Kelham and a factory in Hunslet to produce passive houses, initially for deployment next door in Citu's Climate Innovation District in Leeds.

Greenhouse was visited by the then Secretary of State for Energy and Climate Change, Chris Huhne, in 2012.

== Greenhouse and the cladding crisis ==
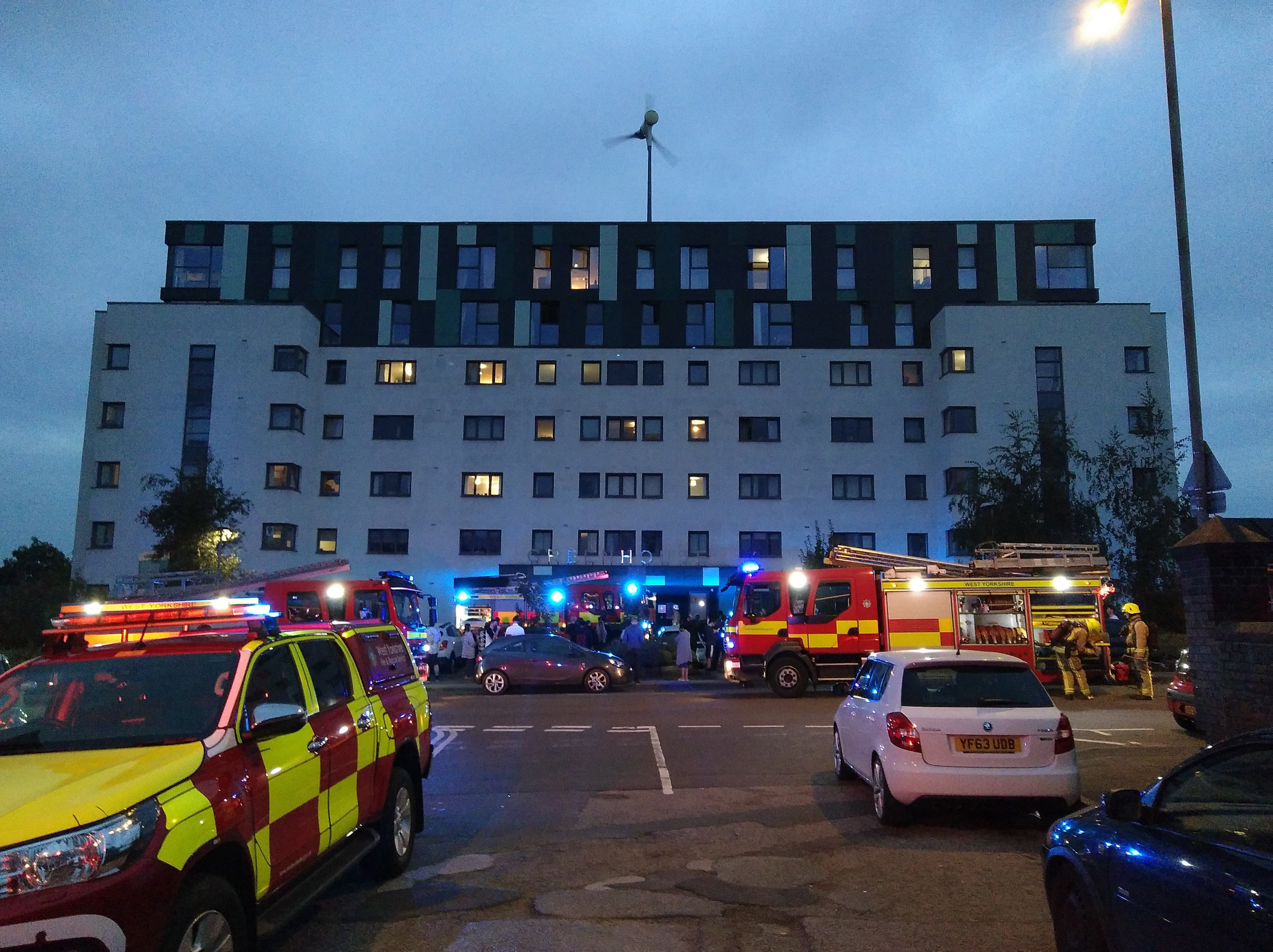
The fire service attends a false alarm at Greenhouse.

See also: United Kingdom cladding crisis

As part of the refurbishment of the building a cladding system was used to improve the insulation of the property. In the wake of the Grenfell Tower fire the cladding was recognised not to be fire-safe, requiring replacement.

== Awards ==
The building has won the following awards.

- Leeds Architecture Awards 2012 — Best Altered Building "Winner"
- Yorkshire Post Environmental Awards 2011 — Project of the Year "Winner"
- Renewal and Regeneration Awards 2011 — "Winner" Sustainability Award
- Renewal and Regeneration Awards 2011 — "Runner Up" Residential
- Housebuider Awards 2011 — Best Low or Zero Carbon Initiative "Highly Commended"
- Yorkshire Insider Property Awards 2011 — "Winner" Regeneration
- Yorkshire Insider Property Awards 2011 — "Runner Up" Design
- Yorkshire Insider Property Awards 2011 — "Runner Up " Sustainability
- RICS Pro-Yorkshire Awards 2011 (Residential) — "Highly Commended"
- RICS Pro-Yorkshire Awards 2011 (Commercial) — "Runner Up"
- RICS Pro-Yorkshire Awards 2011 (Regeneration) — "Runner Up"
- RICS Pro-Yorkshire Awards 2011 (Design and Innovation) — "Runner Up"
- RICS Pro-Yorkshire Awards 2011 (Sustainability) — "Runner Up"
- Energy Saving Trust Micro Generation Awards 2011 — "Winner" Development of the Year
- Building Awards 2011 — "Highly Commended" Housing Project of the Year
- ABDN Awards 2011 — "Runner Up" Business Innovation
- BCIA Awards 2011 — "Winner" Technical Innovation of the Year
- Construction News Awards 2011 — "Runner Up" Environmental Project of the Year
- Construction News Awards 2011 — "Runner Up" Retrofit Project of the Year
- The Housing Design Awards 2011
- The Rosenblatt New Energy Awards 2011 — "Runner Up" Developer of the Year
- Sustain Magazine Awards 2011 — "Runner Up" Project of the Year
- UK Green Building Council 2010 Sustainability Awards — "Winner" Sustainable Refurbishment of the Year
- RIBA White Rose Awards 2010 — Bronze Architecture Award
- RIBA White Rose Awards 2010 — Sustainability Award
- 2010 Premier Guarantee Excellence Award "Winner" — Environmental Project of the Year
- Yorkshire Property Insider Awards 2010 — "Highly Commended" Sustainable Development Award
- Yorkshire Property Insider Awards 2010 — Developer of the Year Award, "Runner Up"
- INCA Awards 2010 — "Winner" Residential High Rise Refurbishment
- INCA Awards 2010 — "Winner" Project of the Year
- INCA Awards 2010 — "Winner" Residential High Rise Refurbishment
- 2010 Northern Design Awards Best Eco Project — "Runner Up"
- CEDIA 2010 International Technology Awards — "Winner" of Best Multi-Dwelling Project
- Estates Gazette — 2009 Green Awards — "Winner" Best Development
- What Green Home? 2009 — "Highly Commended"
