= Hothouse flowers =

Hothouse flowers may refer to:

- Hot House Flowers (album), 1984 album by Wynton Marsalis
- Hothouse Flowers, Irish rock group
- Hot House Flowers, children's book by John H. Wilson

== See also ==
- Hothouse (disambiguation)
- Greenhouse#Uses
