= Hothouse Creek =

Stream if Georgia and North Carolina, U.S.

Coordinates: 34.95130°N 84.29949°W

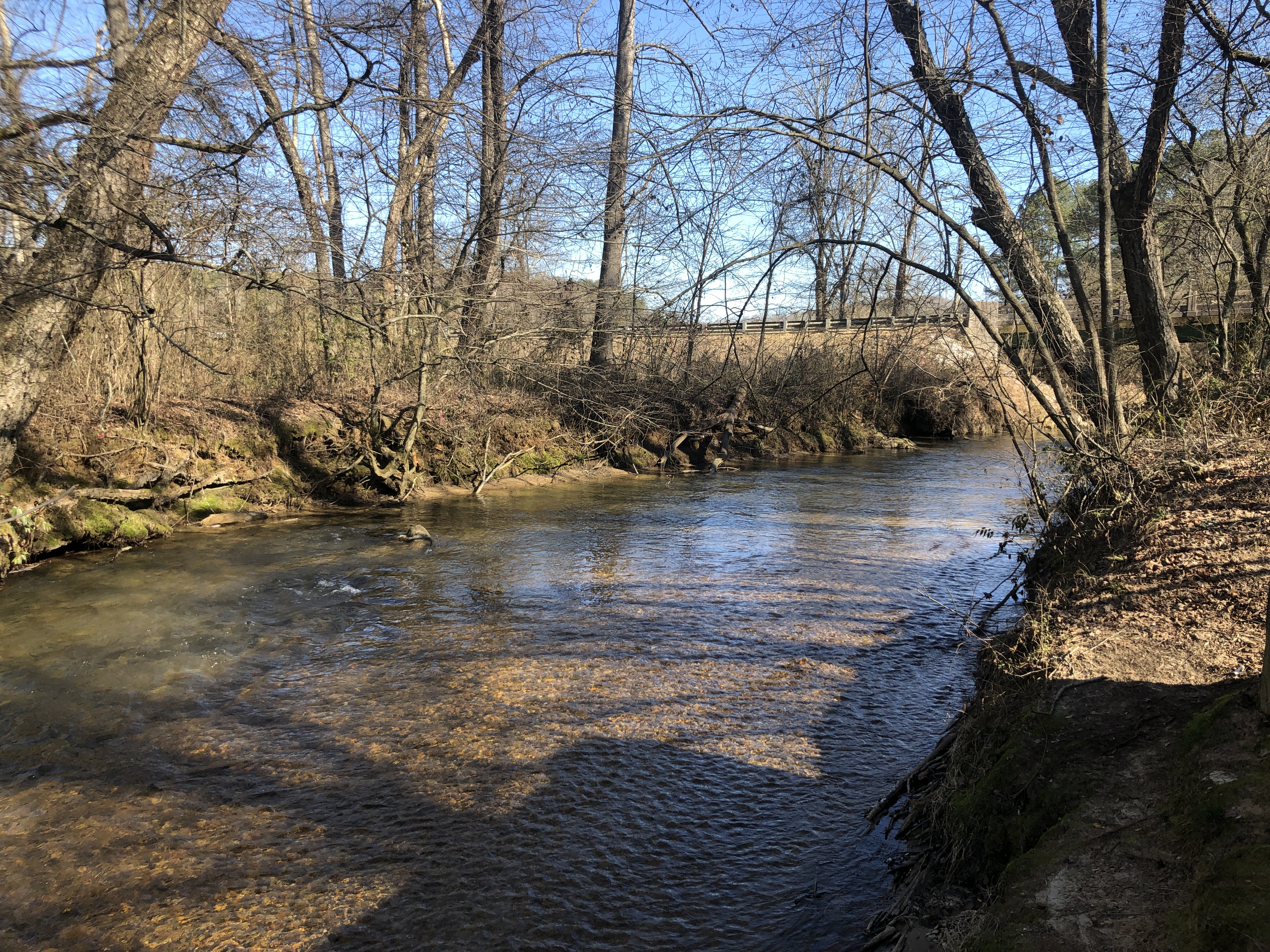
Hothouse Creek Fannin County, Georgia

Hothouse Creek is a stream in the U.S. states of Georgia and North Carolina. It is a tributary to the Toccoa/Ocoee River.

Hothouse Creek was named for Cherokee sweat lodges in the area. An alternative spelling is "Hot House Creek".
