= Greenhouse (surname) =

Greenhouse is a surname. Notable people with the surname include:

- Bernard Greenhouse (1916–2011), American cellist
- Bunny Greenhouse, American civil servant and whistleblower
- Isaiah Greenhouse (born 1987), American football player
- Linda Greenhouse (born 1947), American journalist
- Martha Greenhouse (1921–2013), American actress
- Samuel Greenhouse (1918–2000), American statistician
- Steven Greenhouse, American journalist
