= The Greenhouse (novel) =

1988 novel by Susan Hillmore

- First edition
- Author: Susan Hillmore
- Language: English
- Publisher: Collins Harvill
- Publication date: 1988
- Publication place: United Kingdom
- Media type: Print
- Pages: 125
- ISBN: 0-00-271267-9

The Greenhouse is British author Susan Hillmore's first novel. It was first published in 1988 by Collins Harvill It was republished by Vintage Books in 2000 when it was praised as being one of the 'best books of 2000' according to critics at The Independent.

== Plot introduction ==
The story is told from the point of view of a greenhouse which tells of the family living in the house to which it belongs; most notably Vanessa a girl who grows up alone in the house and garden and is who spent much of her time in the greenhouse until their peace was shattered by a stranger who rapes her. Things can never be the same again for Vanessa as her son is born and inherits his character from his father.

== Reception ==
- Corinna Lothar of the Washington Times noted that, although Hillmore was a visual artist, she employed other forms of sense imagery in the novel, providing "powerful" descriptions of sound, touch, and smell. Lothar also praised the "haunting beauty" of the work.
- The Literary Review praised the novel. '...Moving and poetic...The Greenhouse should be read for the beauty of its descriptions, its original vision, and its complete lack of vulgarity, rare in a contemporary novel.'.
- Kirkus Reviews was however concluded "Though the story's pace is sedate, the imagery throughout is overripe, contrasting the cycle of growth and regeneration with the human characters' barrenness. Depending on your point of view, either a delicately severe parable or a disappointingly reticent sketch."
- Publishers Weekly also has its reservations, stating that it 'suffers from an elliptical style and from an overabundance of images of nature run riot'
