= Charles Jenkinson (priest) =

British clergyman (1887–1949)

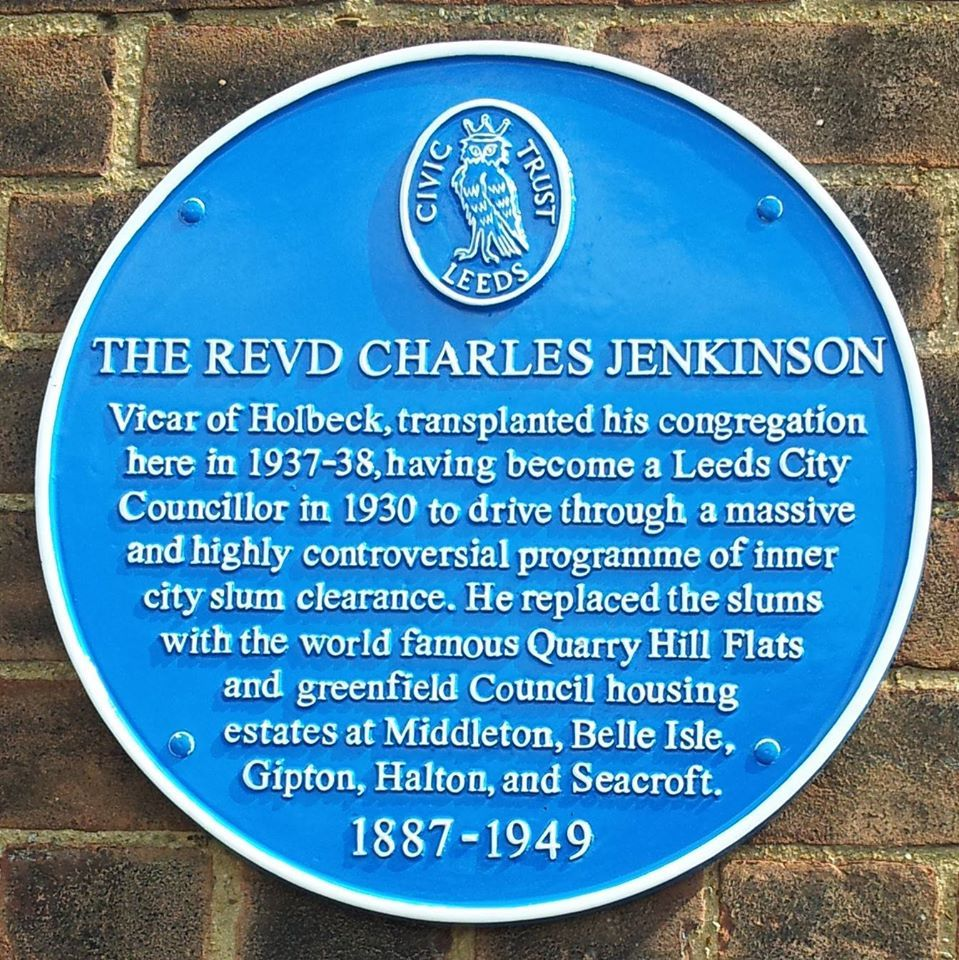
Revd Charles Jenkinson Blue Plaque

Charles Jenkinson (born 93 Sussex Street, Poplar, London, 25 June 1887; died Leeds General Infirmary 3 August 1949) was a Church of England clergyman, housing reformer, and Leeds councillor.

== Life ==
=== Youth in London and Essex ===
Charles Jenkinson's father was a stonemason, also called Charles Jenkinson, and his mother was Mary Ann Elizabeth, née Evans. With seven siblings and irregular work for his father as a docker, Charles Jenkinson grew up experiencing overcrowded East-end urban conditions, even living for a time with his grandmother and an uncle at 78 Sussex Street, Poplar because of a lack of space at home.

Jenkinson was educated at Tarrance Street council school, leaving at fourteen to work as a bookkeeper and help support the family. However, as the years passed he grew increasingly disillusioned with the world of business and its ethics.

Jenkinson took an active role in his local church, St Stephen's, Poplar, and in the Labour Party. At St Stephen's, he was a chorister and then the music librarian. He then became a Sunday school teacher in the parish of St James-the-Less, Bethnal Green. He joined the Labour Party in 1908. Jenkinson's socialist activism led him to meet Ramsay MacDonald and Conrad Noel, and in 1909 he became Noel's lay secretary in the rural parish of Thaxted.

As a member of the Church Socialist League, Jenkinson campaigned against pew rents at St James-the-Less and at Thaxted worked for improved living conditions for farm labourers. He was secretary of the North-West Essex Federation of the National Agricultural Labourers' and Rural Workers' Union, was the election agent for Edward George Maxted when he ran for Essex County Council.

Jenkinson married a Thaxted labourer's daughter, Emily Cecilia Caton (b. 1882/3?), on 28 July 1914, with whom he had a son in 1915. In the assessment of John A. Hargreaves, 'her devoted companionship was crucial in sustaining Jenkinson' through war, study, and 'his remarkable ministry' in the Church of England.

=== War and ordination ===
During the First World War, Jenkinson served successfully in the Royal Army Medical Corps. As a conscientious objector, he refused to fight, and, with other conscientious objectors, was arrested for refusing to be transferred to the infantry. He and other people in this situation were released following a public campaign. During the war years, he also taught himself Latin and Greek.

Following demobilization in April 1919, Jenkinson matriculated at Fitzwilliam Hall, Cambridge to study law and for ordination. He graduated in 1921, after which he attended the Oxford theological college Ripon Hall and, in the same year, became a curate in Barking, London. While at Cambridge, he attempted to establish a branch there of the Christian Socialist League.

=== Vicar of Holbeck and Leeds councillor ===
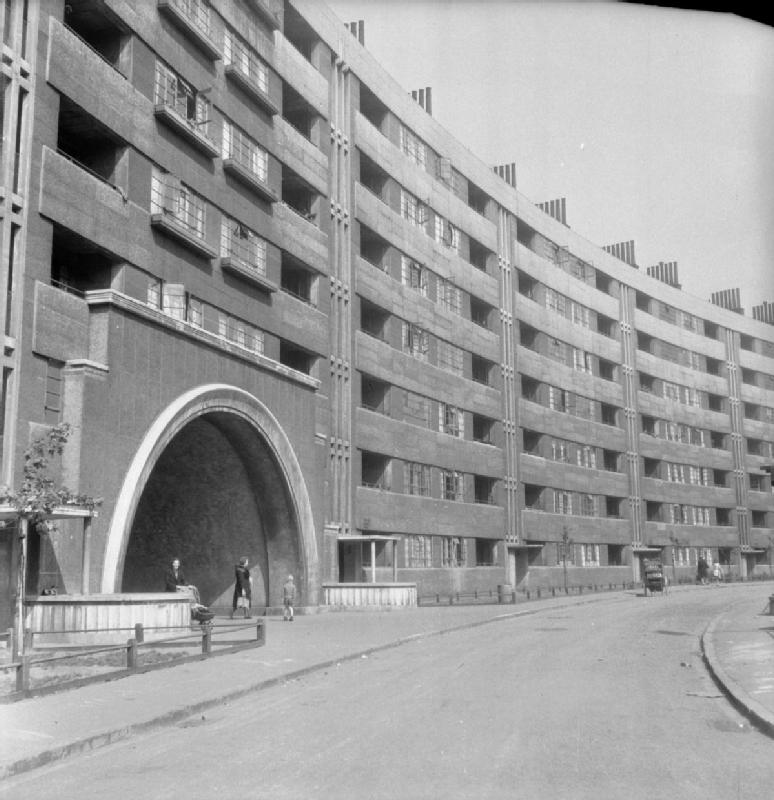
Quarry Hill Flats, one of Jenkinson's foremost social-housing projects, photographed in 1943.

In 1927, Jenkinson requested appointment to 'the hardest parish in the country'; accordingly, he was posted to the parish of St John and St Barnabas, Holbeck, one of the worst slums of Leeds. He stood for election as a Labour councillor for the ward of North Holbeck, winning a seat in November 1930.

Jenkinson's key interest, for which he sought support by drawing on both Christian ethics and socialist thinking, was housing reform, an area in which the Conservative-dominated Council was not even willing to comply with laws such as the Housing Act 1930. His campaigning included publishing the pamphlet Sentimentality or Common Sense? (supported by the local clergy in June 1931); establishing a Council sub-committee on housing policy; in 1933 publishing a ninety-page minority report called Housing Policy in the City of Leeds in response to what he viewed as an inadequate report by the Council; and being the first chair of the new housing committee in Leeds's Labour council of 1933–35, which took the report as its blueprint for action. Within two years of the formation of the committee, Leeds rehoused 6000 inhabitants of slums, mostly to new green-field estates or new flats at Quarry Hill, Leeds, using an innovative differential rent scheme to help poorer families. Many of Jenkinson's own congregation moved to the new estate of Belle Isle, Leeds. In the face of fierce Conservative opposition, however, he lost his seat in 1936. As people were rehoused, they were required to have their furnishings disinfested of lice by the Council, and the vehicle used for this came to be known as 'Jenkinson's bug van'.

In the ensuing decade, however, Jenkinson was appointed or elected to a range of political roles:

- Labour Party sub-committee on town planning and post-war housing (1941).
- Member of the Board of Trade advisory committee on utility furniture (1942).
- Leeds councillor, later overseeing implementation of Leeds's post-war housing policy (1943).
- Leader of Leeds's Labour group, alderman, chairman of the finance and parliamentary committee, and Central Housing Advisory Committee (1947).
- Chairman of Stevenage New Town Development Corporation (1948).

=== Death ===
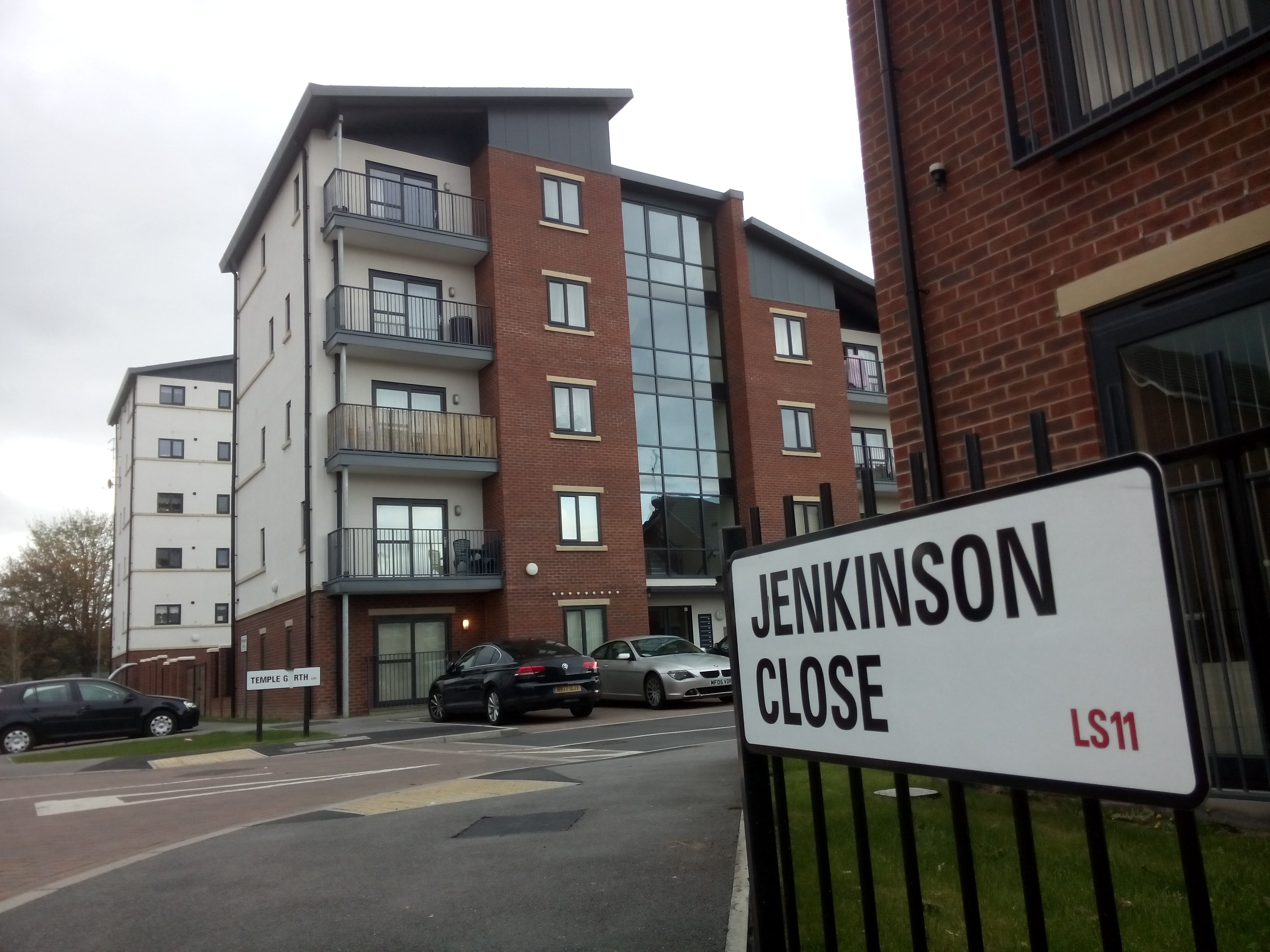
Jenkinson Close, Holbeck, Leeds, named after Charles Jenkinson.

In May 1949, Jenkinson was diagnosed with an inoperable cancer, and he died on 3 August 1949.

== Appearance ==
John A. Hargreaves summarises Jenkinson's appearance thus:

A tall, bespectacled figure with a ruddy complexion and a steadfast and composed look in his penetrating eyes, he exhibited a Spartan lifestyle, wearing for many years an old overcoat purchased for a shilling in a church jumble sale. His most cherished possessions were his books and his bicycle, and he was most characteristically remembered, soft-collared and flannel-trousered, hurtling through the streets of Leeds, with his coat-tails flapping in the wind ... Neither Cambridge nor Oxford, nor indeed Yorkshire, made the slightest impression on his native Cockney accent and his speech was characterized by its high-pitched rapid delivery. A doughty debater, he displayed immense physical and mental energy, his natural modesty giving way in later years to a greater assertiveness, an intolerance of opposition, and an occasional brusqueness.

Jenkinson did not wish, as a clergyman, to accentuate his differences from the laity, and avoided wearing a clerical collar. He would happily help with decorating his Church, clad in a boiler-suit. But he would conduct worship in a Canterbury cap, cassock and gown, and occasionally address political meetings in the same garb when he did not have time to change after a service.

== Theological views ==
Jenkinson's theology was shaped by evangelicalism, Christian socialism (particularly the thought of F. D. Maurice and Percy Dearmer), and Anglo-Catholic leanings characterised by Catholic modernism. In 1921, Jenkinson defended Henry Dewsbury Alves Major, the principal of Ripon Hall, Oxford, when Major was accused of heresy with regard to his ideas about the resurrection of Jesus. He supported the ordination of women in the Anglican communion, and the reunification of the Anglican and Free Church. He opposed the segregation of clergy from laity.

== Biographies ==
- H. J. Hammerton, This Turbulent Priest: The Story of Charles Jenkinson, Parish Priest and Housing Reformer (London: Lutterworth, 1952).
- John A. Hargreaves, 'Jenkinson, Charles (1887–1949)', Oxford Dictionary of National Biography (Oxford: Oxford University Press, 2004), doi:10.1093/ref:odnb/65624.
