= National Register of Historic Places listings in Shiawassee County, Michigan =

The following is a list of Registered Historic Places in Shiawassee County, Michigan.

This National Park Service list is complete through NPS recent listings posted September 26, 2025.

	Name on the Register	Image	Date listed	Location	City or town	Description
1	Nathan Ayres House	Nathan Ayres House	November 4, 1980 (#80001891)	604 N. Water St. 43°00′11″N 84°10′23″W	Owosso	
2	Byron Historic Commercial District	Byron Historic Commercial District	September 13, 1984 (#84001848)	Roughly Saginaw St. from Maple to Water Sts. 42°49′20″N 83°56′39″W	Byron	
3	Charles H. Calkins House	Charles H. Calkins House	March 29, 1978 (#78001511)	127 E. 1st St. 42°49′27″N 84°13′05″W	Perry	
4	Leigh Christian House	Leigh Christian House	November 4, 1980 (#80001892)	622 N. Ball St. 43°00′13″N 84°10′19″W	Owosso	
5	Christian-Ellis House	Christian-Ellis House	November 4, 1980 (#80001893)	600 N. Water St. 43°00′10″N 84°10′23″W	Owosso	
6	Hezekiah W. and Sarah E. Fishell Cobb House	Hezekiah W. and Sarah E. Fishell Cobb House	April 11, 1997 (#97000281)	115 W. 2nd St. 42°49′29″N 84°13′12″W	Perry	
7	Elias Comstock Cabin	Elias Comstock Cabin	November 4, 1980 (#80001894)	Curwood Castle Dr., and John St. 42°59′57″N 84°10′32″W	Owosso	
8	Corunna High School	Corunna High School	March 13, 2017 (#100000748)	106 S. Shiawassee St. 42°58′46″N 84°07′07″W	Corunna	
9	Curwood Castle	Curwood Castle	September 3, 1971 (#71000420)	224 John St. 42°59′58″N 84°10′31″W	Owosso	
10	Duff Building	Duff Building	January 31, 1985 (#85000168)	118 W. Exchange St; 42°59′56″N 84°10′18″W	Owosso	
11	Durand High School	Durand High School	March 17, 2009 (#09000130)	100 West Sycamore Street; 42°54′55″N 83°59′11″W	Durand	
12	Frederick Frieseke Birthplace and Boyhood Home	Frederick Frieseke Birthplace and Boyhood Home	November 4, 1980 (#80001895)	654 N. Water St. 43°00′15″N 84°10′23″W	Owosso	
13	Julius Frieseke House	Julius Frieseke House	April 5, 1990 (#90000574)	529 Corunna Ave. 42°59′30″N 84°09′51″W	Owosso	
14	Amos Gould House	Amos Gould House	November 4, 1980 (#80001896)	115 W. King St. 43°00′16″N 84°10′18″W	Owosso	
15	Daniel Gould House	Daniel Gould House	November 4, 1980 (#80001897)	509 E. Main St. 42°59′52″N 84°09′51″W	Owosso	Building no longer exists.
16	Ebenezer Gould House	Ebenezer Gould House	November 4, 1980 (#80001898)	orig. 603 W. Main St. now: 42°59′01″N 84°07′38″W	Owosso	Building relocated to historic/museum village in nearby Corunna.
17	Grand Trunk Railway Station	Grand Trunk Railway Station	May 6, 1971 (#71000419)	200 Railroad St. 42°54′33″N 83°58′57″W	Durand	
18	Grow Block	Grow Block	January 31, 1985 (#85000169)	120-122 W. Exchange St. 42°59′56″N 84°10′18″W	Owosso	
19	William Horton Farmhouse	William Horton Farmhouse	April 10, 1986 (#86000711)	1647 W. Miller Rd. 42°51′49″N 84°11′52″W	Morrice	
20	House at 314 W. King St.	House at 314 W. King St.	November 4, 1980 (#80001899)	314 W. King St. 43°00′18″N 84°10′26″W	Owosso	Replaced by a newer house at the same address.
21	John N. Ingersoll House	John N. Ingersoll House	May 9, 1980 (#80001890)	570 W. Corunna Ave. 42°58′57″N 84°07′35″W	Corunna	
22	Eugene Jacobs House	Eugene Jacobs House	November 4, 1980 (#80004553)	220 W. King St. 43°00′18″N 84°10′23″W	Owosso	
23	Lincoln School	Lincoln School	August 8, 2016 (#16000510)	120 Michigan Ave. 42°59′50″N 84°10′29″W	Owosso	
24	Martin Road Bridge	Martin Road Bridge	July 12, 1991 (#91000876)	Martin Rd. across the Shiawassee River, Caledonia Township; 42°58′08″N 84°03′21″W	Corunna	In 2016, the bridge was disassembled and removed by Bach Steel. Renovation is underway, and it will be re-assembled at the Auburn Heights Preserve in Yorklyn, Delaware.
25	Mason Street Historic Residential District	Mason Street Historic Residential District	November 4, 1980 (#80001900)	Roughly bounded by Laverock Alley, Dewey, Hickory and Exchange Sts. 42°59′57″N 84°09′54″W	Owosso	
26	Colin McCormick House	Colin McCormick House	November 4, 1980 (#80001901)	222 E. Exchange St. 42°59′53″N 84°10′06″W	Owosso	
27	Michigan Avenue-Genesee Street Historic Residential District	Michigan Avenue-Genesee Street Historic Residential District	November 4, 1980 (#80001902)	Roughly bounded by Michigan Ave.; Shiawassee, Cass and Clinton Sts. 42°59′43″N 84°10′32″W	Owosso	
28	Selden Miner House	Selden Miner House	November 4, 1980 (#80001903)	418 W. King St. 43°00′18″N 84°10′32″W	Owosso	
29	Old Miller Hospital	Old Miller Hospital	November 4, 1980 (#80001904)	121 Michigan Ave. 42°59′48″N 84°10′29″W	Owosso	
30	Oliver Street Historic District	Oliver Street Historic District	November 4, 1980 (#80001905)	Oliver St. between 3rd and Oak Sts., Williams and Goodhue Sts. 43°00′06″N 84°10′24″W	Owosso	
31	Sylvester Opdyke House	Sylvester Opdyke House	November 4, 1980 (#80001906)	655 N. Pine St. 43°00′16″N 84°10′33″W	Owosso	
32	Owosso Downtown Historic District	Owosso Downtown Historic District	April 7, 2014 (#14000126)	Roughly bounded by Shiawassee R., Comstock, Water, Park and Mason Sts. 42°59′53″N 84°10′14″W	Owosso	
33	Albert Palmer House	Albert Palmer House	November 4, 1980 (#80001907)	528-530 River St. 42°59′58″N 84°10′43″W	Owosso	
34	George Pardee House	George Pardee House	November 4, 1980 (#80001908)	603 N. Ball St. 43°00′10″N 84°10′20″W	Owosso	
35	Pere Marquette Railway Steam Locomotive No. 1225	Pere Marquette Railway Steam Locomotive No. 1225	July 31, 1994 (#94000744)	600 S. Oakwood St. 42°59′35″N 84°09′53″W	Owosso	
36	George Perrigo House	George Perrigo House	November 4, 1980 (#80001909)	213 N. Cedar St. 42°59′56″N 84°10′55″W	Owosso	
37	Shiawassee County Courthouse	Shiawassee County Courthouse	November 12, 1982 (#82000546)	Shiawassee St. 42°58′53″N 84°07′02″W	Corunna	see Claire Allen for more info
38	Edwin Todd House	Edwin Todd House	November 4, 1980 (#80001910)	520 N. Adams St. 43°00′10″N 84°10′28″W	Owosso	
39	West Town Historic Commercial and Industrial District	West Town Historic Commercial and Industrial District	November 4, 1980 (#80001911)	Main St. 42°59′55″N 84°11′02″W	Owosso	
40	Alfred Williams House	Alfred Williams House	November 4, 1980 (#80001912)	611 N. Ball St. 43°00′12″N 84°10′20″W	Owosso	
41	Benjamin Williams House	Benjamin Williams House	November 4, 1980 (#80001913)	628 N. Ball St. 43°00′14″N 84°10′19″W	Owosso	
42	Williams-Cole House	Williams-Cole House	December 4, 1986 (#86003418)	6810 Newburg Rd. 42°54′35″N 84°01′49″W	Durand	
43	Lee Woodard and Sons Building	Lee Woodard and Sons Building	November 4, 1980 (#80001914)	306 S. Elm St. 42°59′42″N 84°10′42″W	Owosso	
44	Lyman Woodard Company Workers' Housing	Lyman Woodard Company Workers' Housing	November 4, 1980 (#80001916)	601 Clinton St. 42°59′47″N 84°10′43″W	Owosso	
45	Lyman Woodard Furniture and Casket Company Building	Lyman Woodard Furniture and Casket Company Building	November 4, 1980 (#80001915)	216-222 Elm St. 42°59′44″N 84°10′43″W	Owosso	

== See also ==
- List of Michigan State Historic Sites in Shiawassee County, Michigan
- List of National Historic Landmarks in Michigan
- National Register of Historic Places listings in Michigan
- Listings in neighboring counties: Clinton, Genesee, Gratiot, Ingham, Livingston, Saginaw
