= Leigh Christian House =

- U.S. National Register of Historic Places
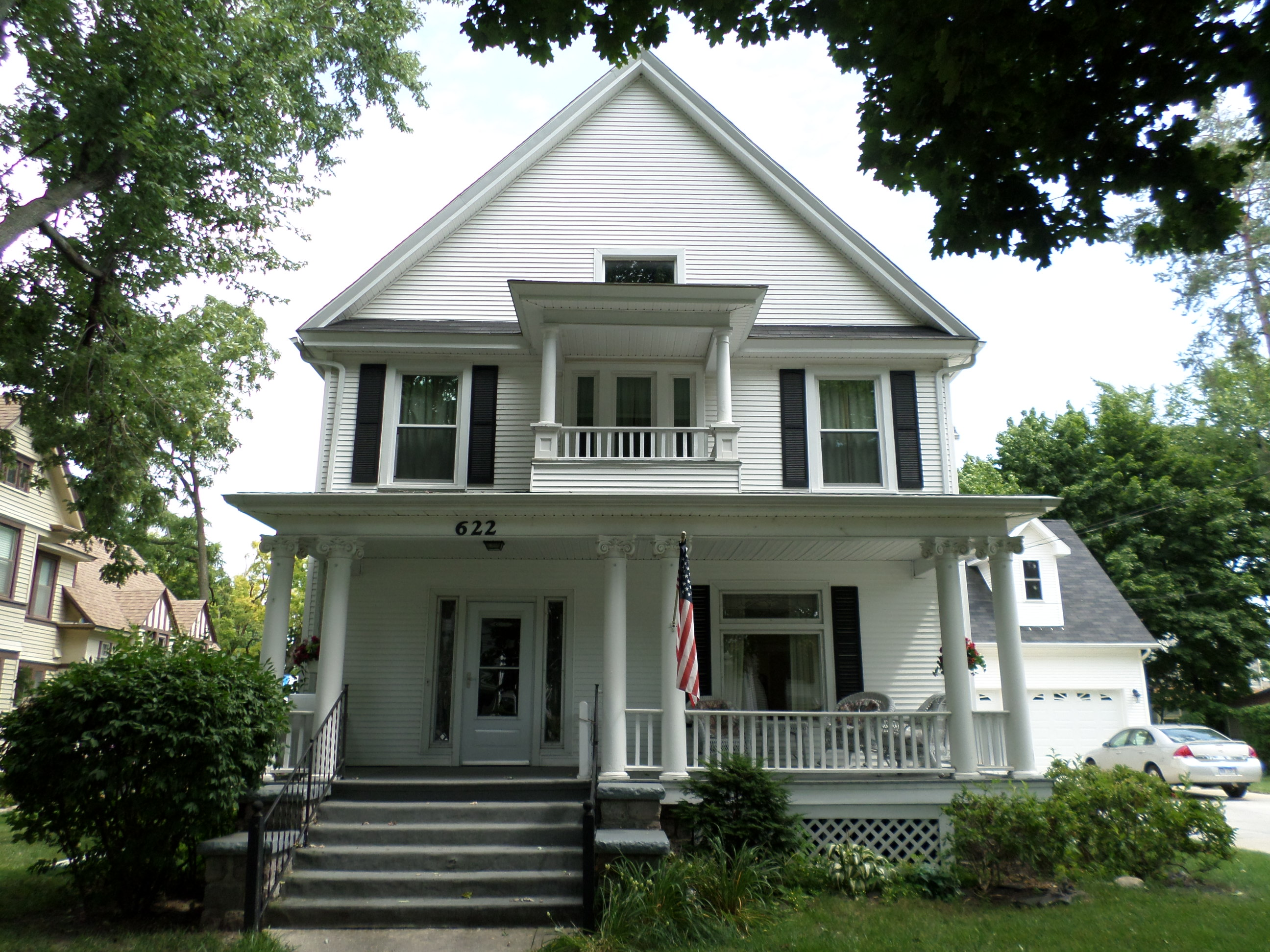
- Interactive map
- Location: 622 N. Ball St., Owosso, Michigan
- Coordinates: 43°00′13″N 84°10′19″W
- Area: less than one acre
- Built: 1895
- Architectural style: Queen Anne, Georgian
- MPS: Owosso MRA
- NRHP reference No.: 80001892
- Added to NRHP: November 4, 1980

The Leigh Christian House is a single-family home located at 622 North Ball Street in Owosso, Michigan. It was listed on the National Register of Historic Places in 1980.

== History ==
In 1885, Daniel M. Christian opened a large dry-goods business in Owosso, the first real store in the town. By the turn of the century, Christian's store had evolved into the first real department store in town. Christian's son, Leigh was also involved in the business, and in 1895 Leigh constructed this house on Ball Street. Daniel Christian eventually turned the store over to Leigh Christian, who continued to stock a well-diversified array of products, but focused more on apparel and household goods. Leigh eventually moved out of this house into his father's house (the Goodhue-Christian House in the Oliver Street Historic District).

== Description ==
The Leigh Christian House has a mix of Queen Anne and Georgian Revival architectural elements. The Queen Anne details include the broad front porch, diverse window styles, and steeply pitched roof. Georgian Revival elements include the symmetry of the main mass, the balance of window locations, the Ionic columns on the front porch, and the small balcony on the second story.
