= Christian-Ellis House =

- U.S. National Register of Historic Places
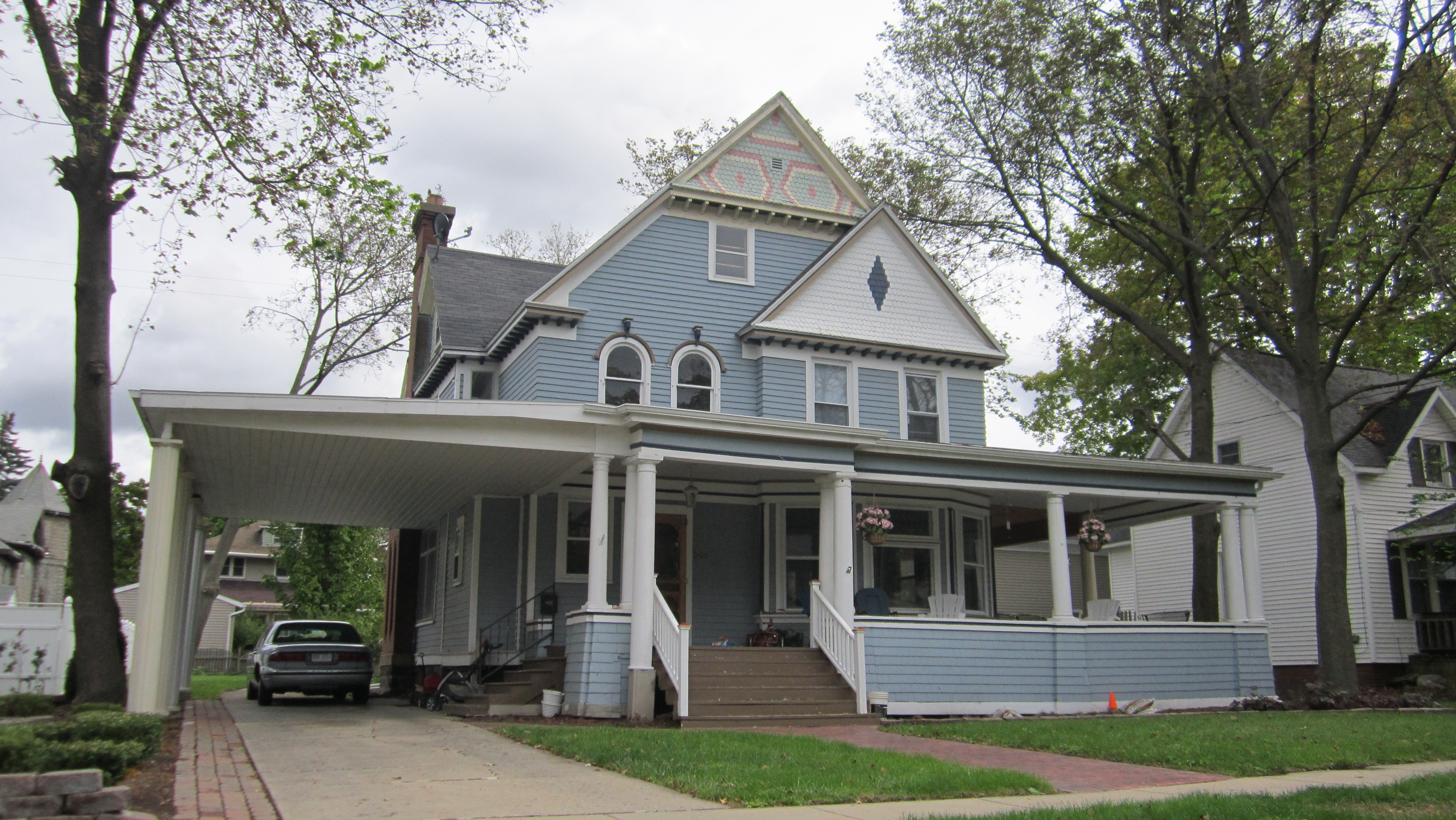
- Interactive map
- Location: 600 N. Water St., Owosso, Michigan
- Coordinates: 43°00′10″N 84°10′23″W
- Area: less than one acre
- Built: 1895
- Architectural style: Georgian Revival
- MPS: Owosso MRA
- NRHP reference No.: 80001893
- Added to NRHP: November 4, 1980

The Christian-Ellis House is a single-family home in Owosso, Michigan, built in 1895. It was listed on the National Register of Historic Places in 1980.

== History ==
In 1885, Daniel M. Christian opened a large dry-goods business in Owosso, the first real store in the town. By the turn of the century, Christian's store had evolved into the first real department store in town. In about 1895, Christian constructed this house for his family. He lived here until moving into the Goodhue-Christian House (located in the Oliver Street Historic District). After Christian moved, the house was purchased by J. Edwin Ellis, president of the Independent Stove Company. Ellis had relocated Independent Stove from Detroit in 1908, and continued to live in Detroit, coming to Owosso only for business. However, around 1910, Ellis permanently moved to Owosso. He became actively involved in the city's social life, and served multiple terms as the city's Mayor between 1941 and 1947.

== Description ==
The Christian-Ellis House is a transitional design, containing both Queen Anne and Georgian Revival elements. It is a wood-frame house clad in clapboard, with fish-scale shingling in the gable ends. Queen Anne elements of the design include an asymmetrical floorplan, windows of different styles, a broad wrap-around porch, and an irregular roofline with two gable ends located above the front facade. Georgian Revival features include Doric columns on the porch, paired rounded arch windows on the second story level, and small brackets at the corniceline.
