= Albert Palmer House =

- U.S. National Register of Historic Places
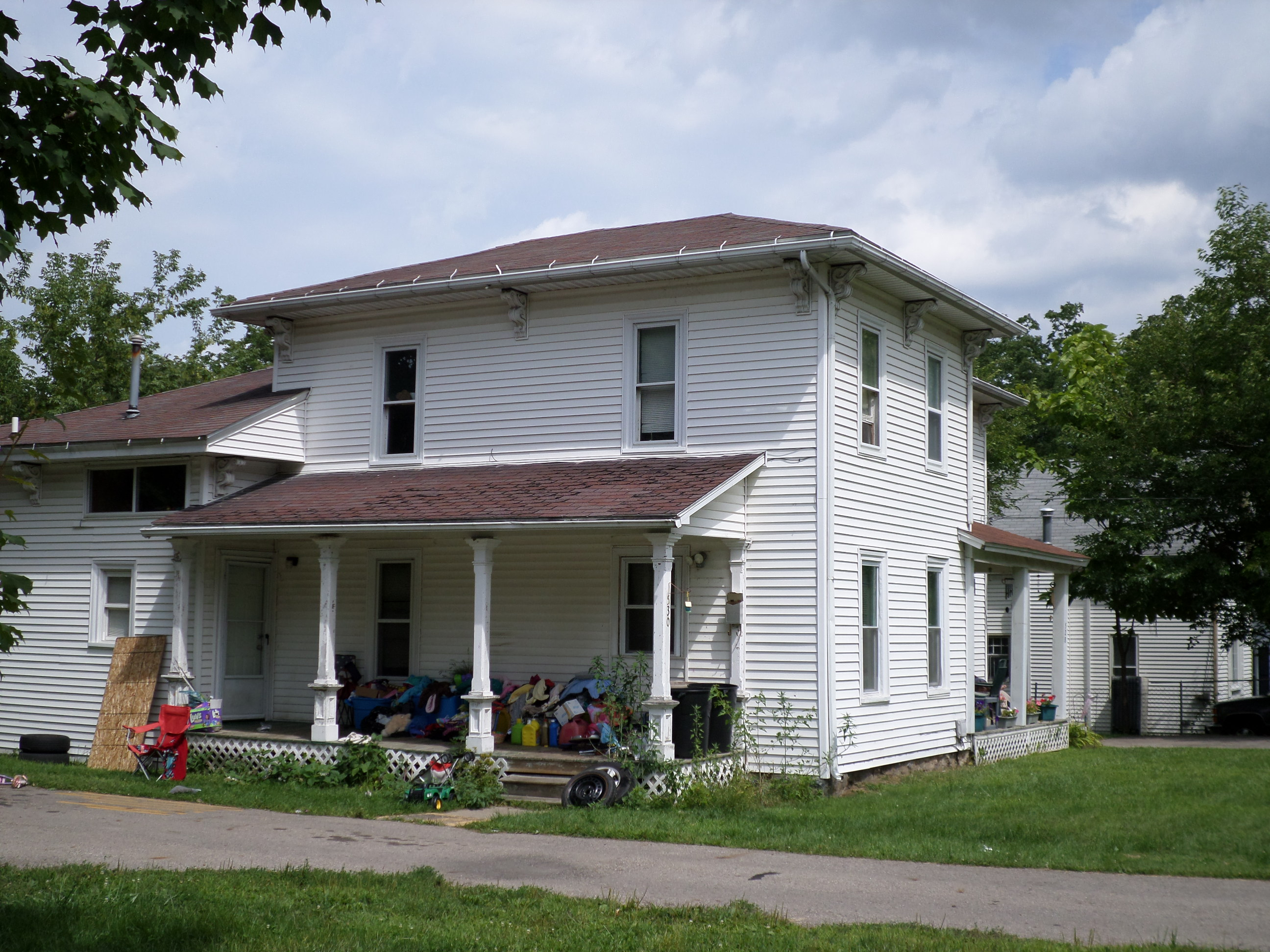
- Interactive map
- Location: 528-530 River St., Owosso, Michigan
- Coordinates: 42°59′58″N 84°10′43″W
- Area: 2 acres (0.81 ha)
- Built: 1875
- Built by: Albert Palmer
- Architectural style: Italianate
- MPS: Owosso MRA
- NRHP reference No.: 80001907
- Added to NRHP: November 4, 1980

The Albert Palmer House is a single-family home located at 528-530 River Street in Owosso, Michigan. It was listed on the National Register of Historic Places in 1980.

== History ==
Albert Palmer moved to Owosso from Jackson, Michigan in 1875. He founded a construction firm with his brother Harmon, and the two men built many of Owosso's residential and commercial buildings. One of the first buildings constructed was this home for Albert, built in 1875. The home was later split into a duplex residence for Albert Palmer's two sons, and later was the residence of Rudolph J. Beehler, Jr., a local cabinetmaker. In the 1980s, the house was restored as a single family residence.

== Description ==
The Albert Palmer House is a five bay, two story L-shaped Italianate house with a hipped roof. It is simple in overall massing and design, but has rich ornamentation around the windows, and more at the corniceline. Trabeated enframements, topped with molded wood lintels, surround windows on the first floor. On the second floor, an elaborate carving is on each lintel. The eaves are supported by carved brackets.
