= Nathan Ayres House =

- U.S. National Register of Historic Places
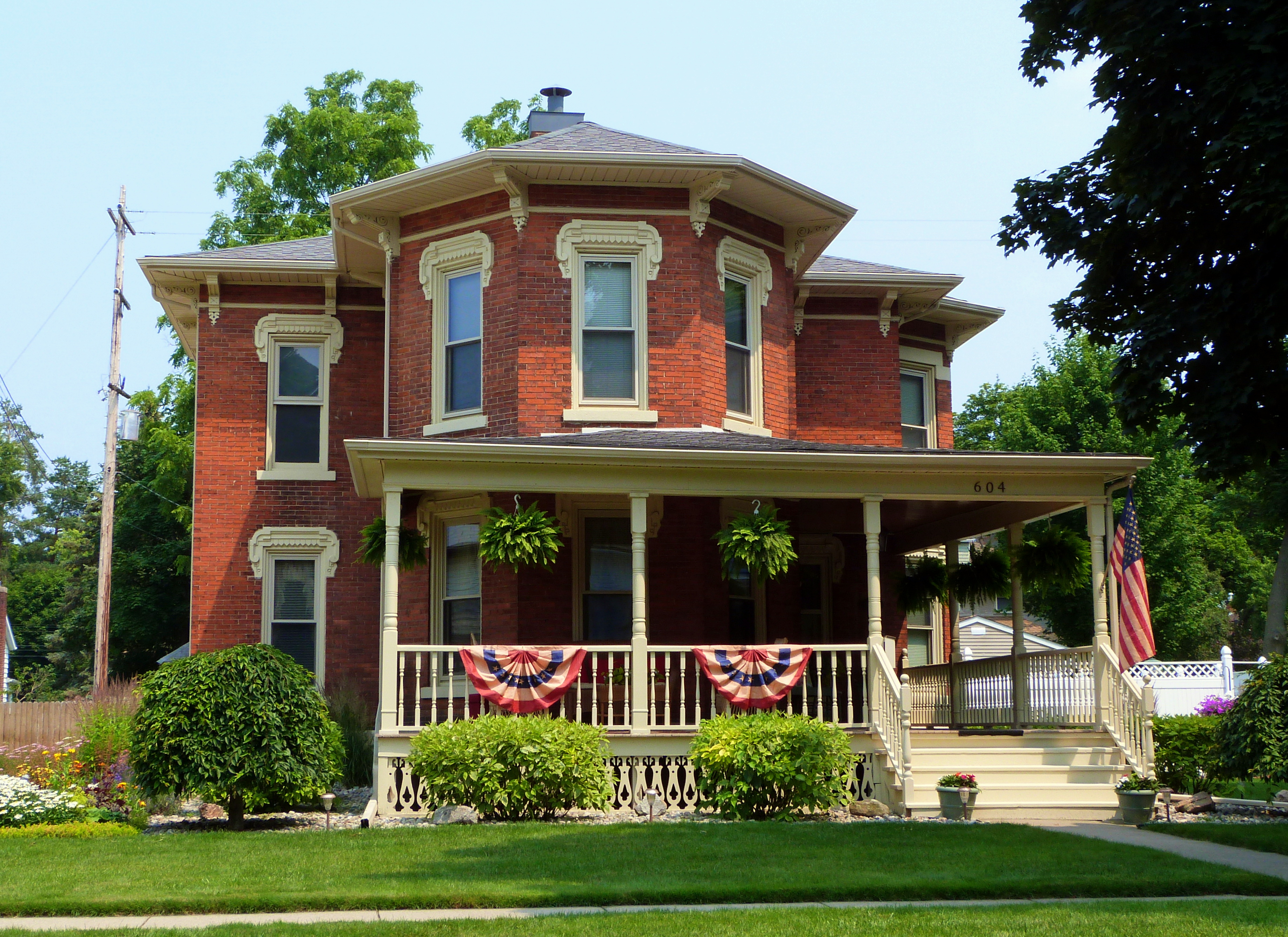
- Interactive map
- Location: 604 N. Water St., Owosso, Michigan
- Coordinates: 43°00′11″N 84°10′23″W
- Area: less than one acre
- Built: 1883
- Built by: Nathan Ayres
- Architectural style: Italianate
- MPS: Owosso MRA
- NRHP reference No.: 80001891
- Added to NRHP: November 4, 1980

The Nathan Ayres House is a single-family home located at 604 North Water Street in Owosso, Michigan. It was added to the National Register of Historic Places in 1980.

== History ==
Nathan Ayres was born in 1842 and arrived in Owosso as a young man. He was a brick mason by trade, and was well-off enough that in about 1883 he constructed this brick home on North Water Street. Little more is known about Nathan, but his daughter, Effie, (born in 1867), was educated in Owosso and taught in the local school system for many years before being promoted to principal at Owosso's Central School.

== Description ==
The Nathan Ayres House is an Italianate structure with a distinctive five-sided bay on the front facade. It has tall one-over-one double hung sash windows topped with carved stone lintels, a broad front porch, and squared brackets underneath the eaves of a hipped roof.
