= Colin McCormick House =

Historic house in Michigan, United States

- U.S. National Register of Historic Places
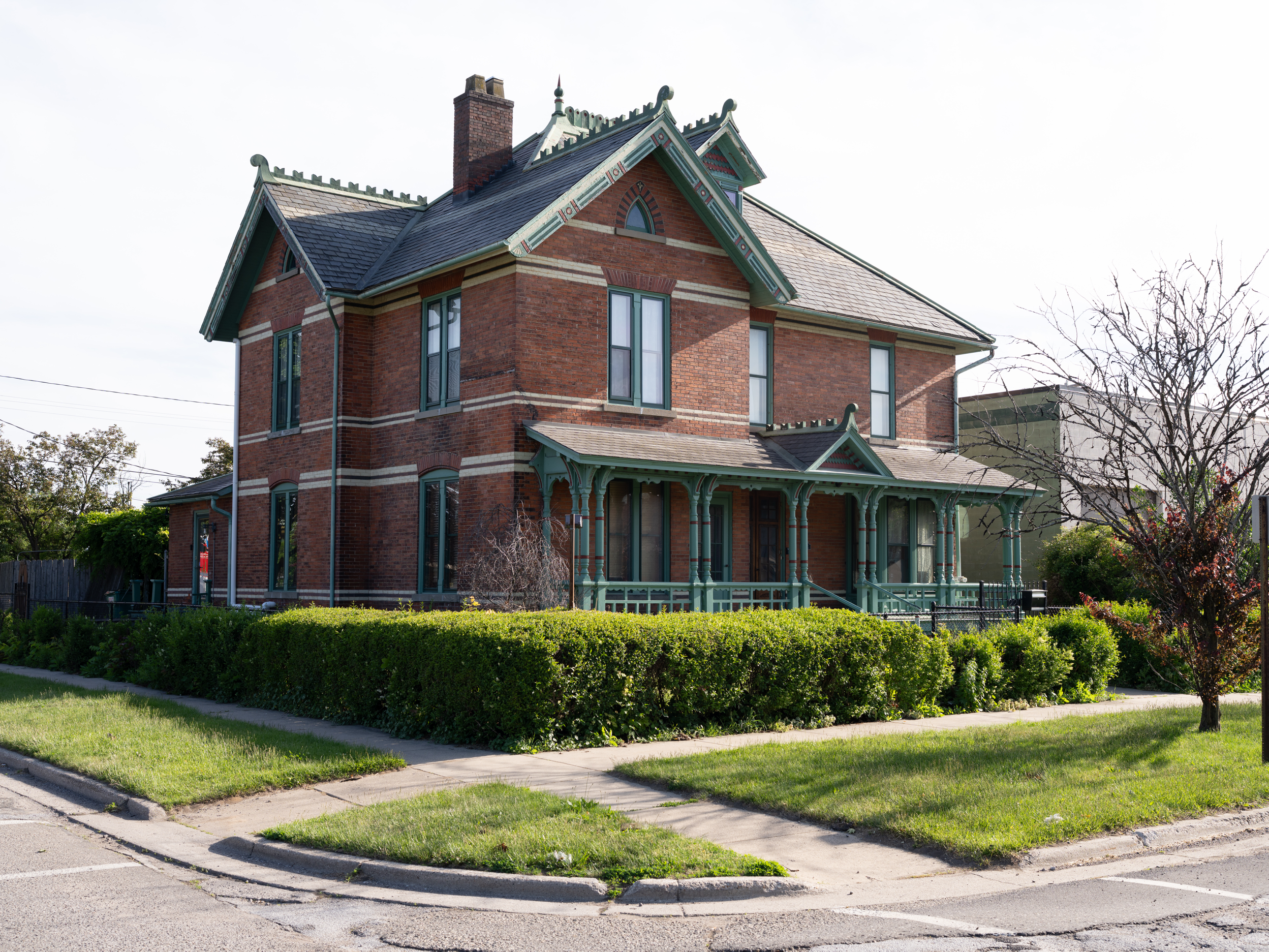
- Colin McCormick House

- Location within Michigan Location within the United States
- Interactive map
- Location: 222 E. Exchange St., Owosso, Michigan
- Coordinates: 42°59′53″N 84°10′6″W
- Area: less than one acre
- Built: 1886
- Architectural style: Gothic Revival
- MPS: Owosso MRA
- NRHP reference No.: 80001901
- Added to NRHP: November 4, 1980

The Colin McCormick House is a historical house in Owosso, Michigan, designed by Edger Ingersoll, and is notable for its size. It has had only 4 owners in its more than 120-year history. The last member of the McCormick family died in the house at 107 years of age. Edger Ingersoll incorporated features like the slate roof, crocheted roof ridging, hipped roof, scalloped trim, and more. It lies at 220 E. Exchange. The house was added to the National Register of Historic Places in 1980.

== History ==
Dr. Colin McCormick moved to Owosso in 1875 after graduating from McGill University in Montreal and the University of Michigan. He helped found the Shiawassee County Medical Association in 1879, and served as Mayor of Owosso for one term in 1883. In 1886, he constructed this house for his family. His second wife, Annie, managed much of the social side of the McCormicks' life.

== Description ==
The Colin McCormick House is a two-story brick High Victorian Gothic home with a gable and hipped roof, and is one of the most elegant residences in Owosso. It is constructed of a polychrome palette, with a pink, slate, blue, and creme dressed fieldstone foundation, red brick walls, yellow brick band courses, and grey, red, blue, and green slate roof. The house has a Gothic arch window in the gable end, bargeboards with decorative carving, and dormers containing stained glass windows and fish-scale shingling. The original porch has Eastlake-inspired detailing.

== Design ==
The Colin McCormick House has 3 bathrooms, 4 bedrooms, a skylight, brick walls, and covers 3425 square feet.
