= Old Miller Hospital =

- U.S. National Register of Historic Places
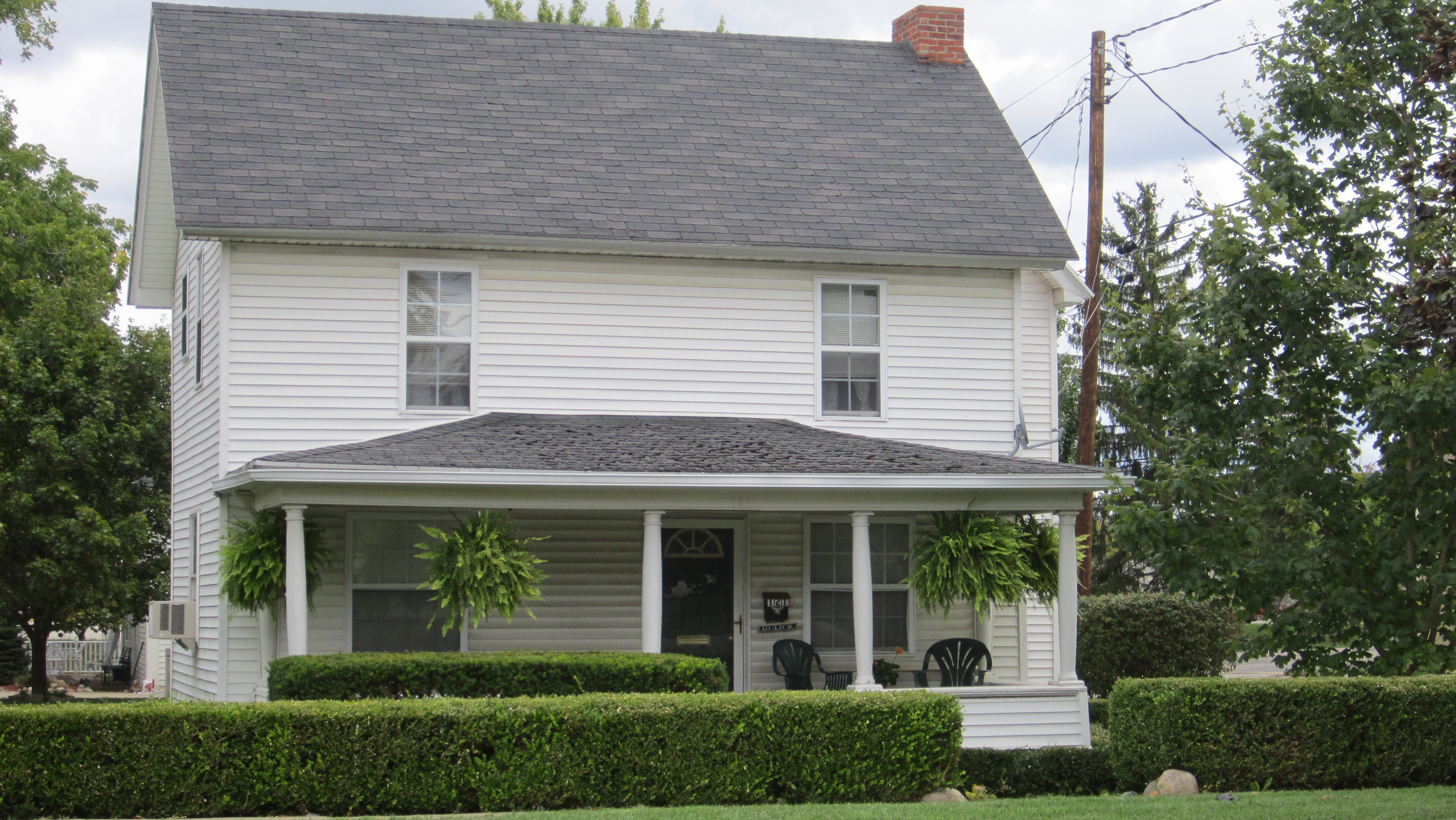
- Interactive map
- Location: 121 Michigan Ave., Owosso, Michigan
- Coordinates: 42°59′48″N 84°10′29″W
- Area: 1.9 acres (0.77 ha)
- Built: 1895
- MPS: Owosso MRA
- NRHP reference No.: 80001904
- Added to NRHP: November 4, 1980

The Old Miller Hospital was constructed as a single-family home located at 121 Michigan Avenue in Owosso, Michigan; it was later converted to a private hospital. It was listed on the National Register of Historic Places in 1980.

== History ==
This small clapboard house was likely constructed in 1895 (although it may have been converted from a barn constructed previous to that date). In 1908, Mary Miller purchased the house and converted it into Owosso's first hospital. At first, the Miller Hospital contained a single operating room (the original living room) and two patient beds. The hospital was staffed by Miller and one additional nurse, and was utilized by doctors who had patients requiring more extensive care. The hospital ran on a tight budget for a few years, but by 1910, the utility of having a local hospital was being recognized. Other organizations and medical professionals began providing support, and soon an additional operating room was constructed, and the hospital grew to a ten-bed facility. In 1916, Miller sold the hospital to Bertha Bowman. Not long after, a new private hospital, the Swayze Hospital on Pine Street, and in 1921 a public hospital was constructed in Owosso. By this time, Bowman had closed the Miller Hospital.

== Description ==
The Old Miller Hospital is a two-story wood-framed structure covered with clapboard. It is two bays wide and has an irregular floorplan, symmetrically placed windows, and a broad porch running the full width of the front of the house. It is topped by a gable roof, with the corniceline facing the street. The house has an interesting two story side bay and several additions in the rear.
