= Byron Historic Commercial District =

- U.S. National Register of Historic Places
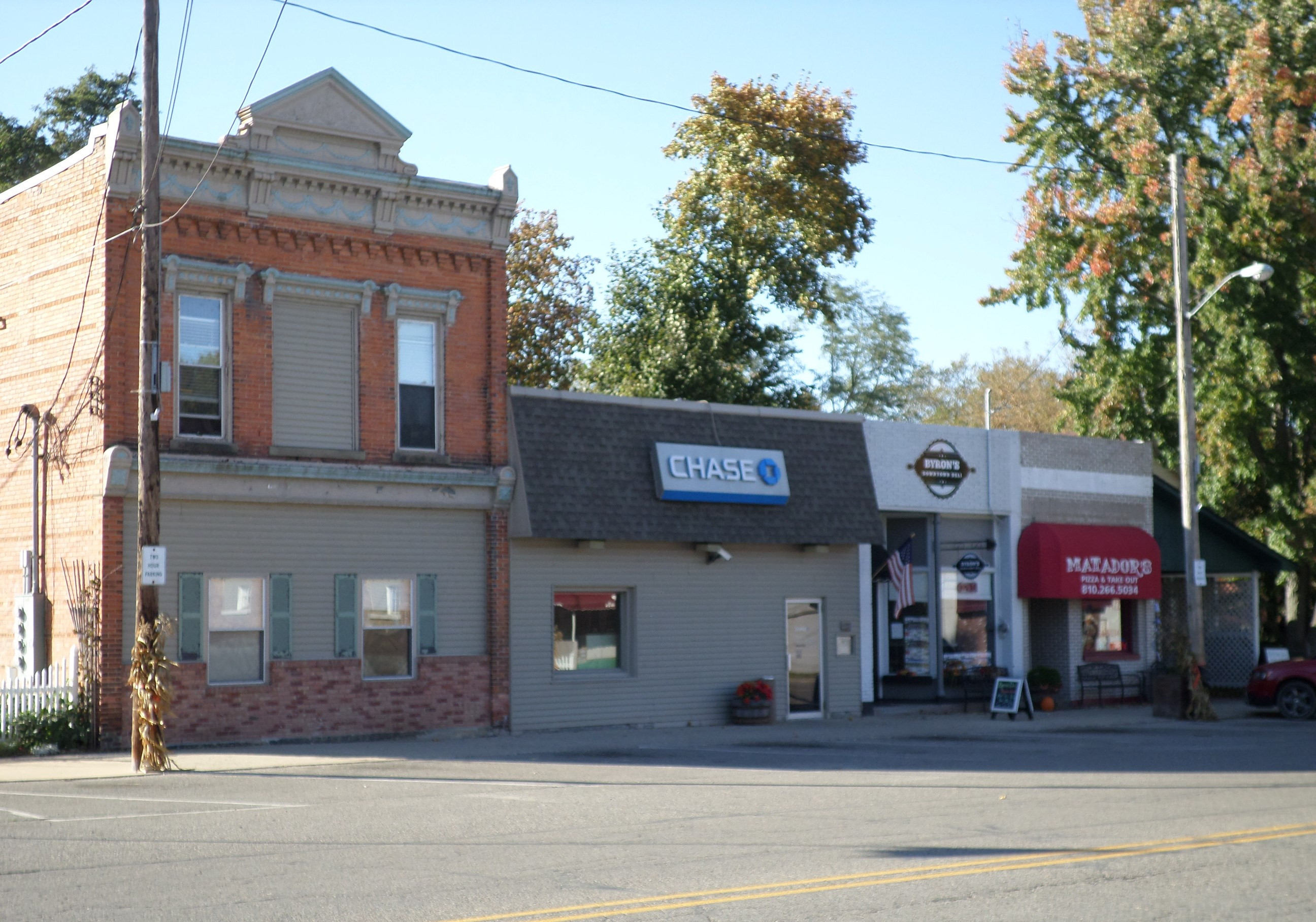
- Interactive map
- Location: Roughly Saginaw St. from Maple to Water Sts., Byron, Michigan
- Coordinates: 42°49′20″N 83°56′39″W
- Area: 12 acres (4.9 ha)
- Architectural style: Late 19th And 20th Century Revivals, Late Victorian, Greek Revival
- NRHP reference No.: 84001848
- Added to NRHP: September 13, 1984

The Byron Historic Commercial District is a substantially commercial historic district, located in downtown Byron, Michigan, roughly along Saginaw Street from Maple Street to Water Street. The district was listed on the National Register of Historic Places in 1984.

== History ==
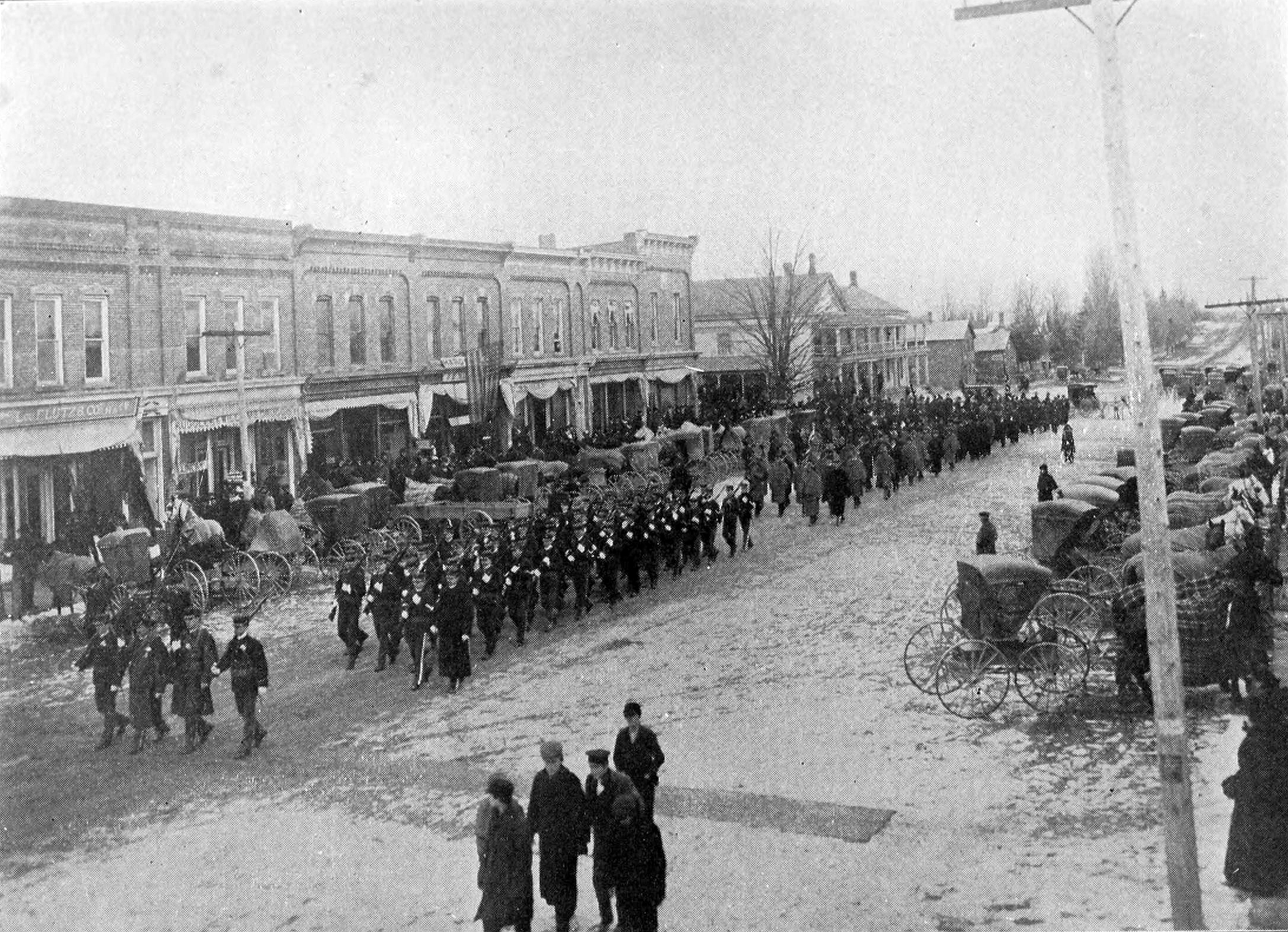
Funeral in downtown Byron, 1900

In 1824, land speculator Samuel W. Dexter (who also founded Dexter, Michigan) founded the village of Byron. By 1828, the village was developing, and in 1836, Dexter sold his interest in the community to a group who formed the "Byron Mill Company," which aimed to make the village a timber milling center by damming the river and erecting a sawmill. Settlement moved quickly, with the village's first frame residence built in 1837. In 1841 and 1842, the village gained a hotel and the first general store in what is now the downtown. Also in 1842, the mill changed hands; the new owners rebuilt is as a flour mill, reflecting the growing importance of agriculture. Over the next few decades, wheat and sheep grew in importance, and the village of Byron slowly grew to accommodate the surrounding farmers. Although never a regional center of trade and shipping, Byron did see increased business, including the manufacture of farming implements.

Growth in Byron accelerated during the 1880s and 1890s as demand for goods increased, but the village still remained small as it was bypassed by the railroads. However, the bulk of the current downtown was constructed in the 1880s. in the 20th century, however, the rise of the automobile and the conglomeration of surrounding farms into large agricultural businesses has narrowed the commercial district's use. However, in the 1910s an elevator was constructed and the mill rebuilt as a feed mill. The section of the downtown in the commercial district retains many of the historic buildings from the 19th century, although a disastrous fire in 2012 destroyed a large block of them.

== Description ==
The Byron Historic Commercial District consists of a two-and-one-half block long commercial district, covering the downtown area of the village. The district includes thirty-five buildings, of which twenty-two are one-and two-story commercial buildings, nine are houses, and the remaining structures include a mill, a factory, a dam, and a bridge. Of the thirty-five, twenty-six contribute to the historic character of the district, and include a selection of vernacular Greek Revival, Italianate, and early 20th century architectural style, constructed in wood and brick between 1840 and 1940.

The district includes some of the first strictures built in Byron, such as the first frame residence in the village, built in 1837; the first store in the village, built c. 1840, and an inn, constructed in 1848 to replace the inn built in 1842.
