= Selden Miner House =

- U.S. National Register of Historic Places
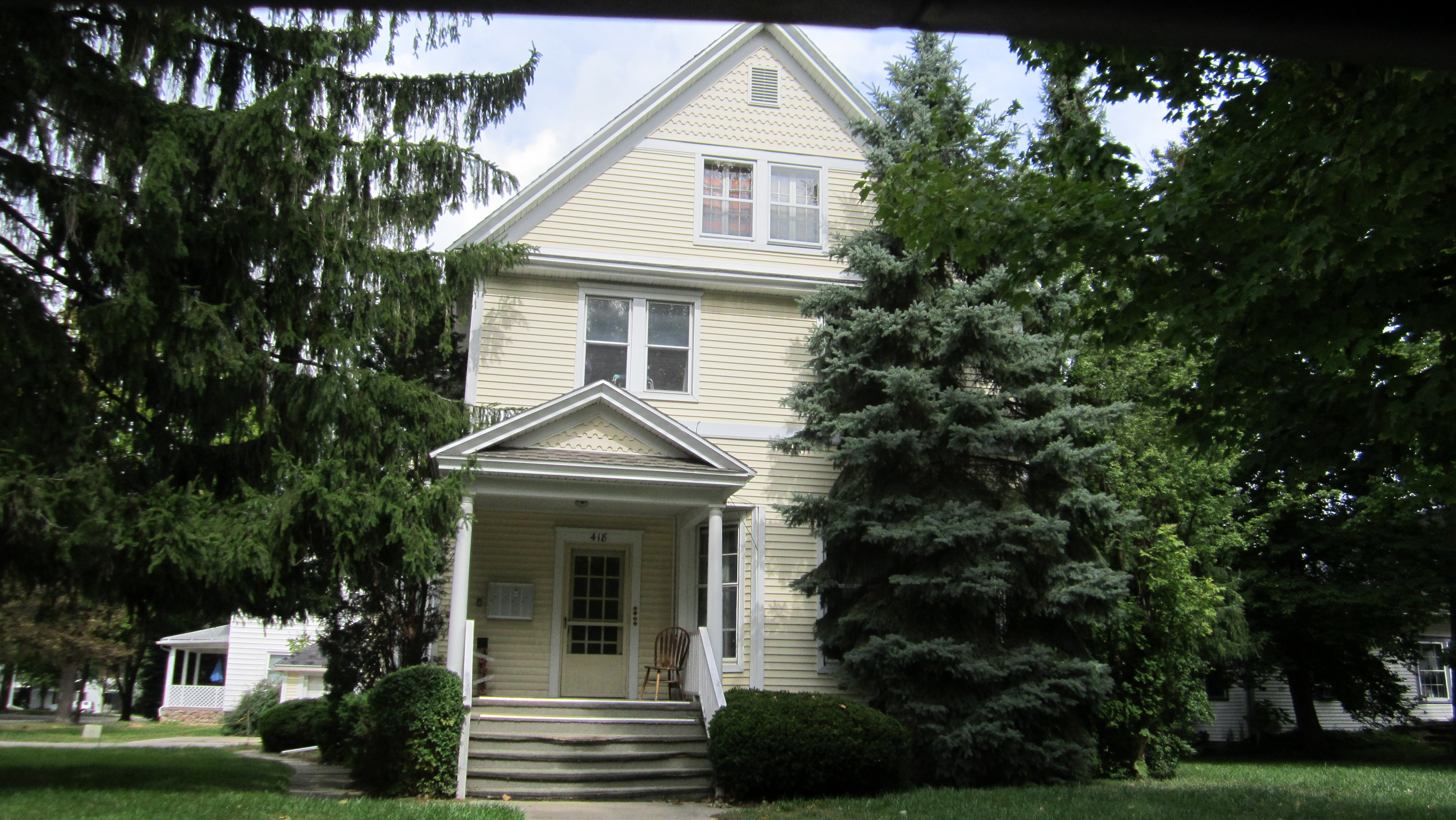
- Interactive map
- Location: 418 W. King St., Owosso, Michigan
- Coordinates: 43°00′18″N 84°10′32″W
- Area: less than one acre
- Built: 1890
- Architectural style: Queen Anne
- MPS: Owosso MRA
- NRHP reference No.: 80001903
- Added to NRHP: November 4, 1980

The Selden Miner House is a single-family home located at 418 West King Street in Owosso, Michigan. It was listed on the National Register of Historic Places in 1980.

== History ==
Seldon S. Miner was an attorney, and was admitted to the Shiawassee County Bar in 1878. He established a legal practice in Owosso, and was soon doing great business. He additionally served on the Circuit Court Commission and later served as a County Judge. He invested profits from his legal practice into a number of the manufacturing firms being established at the time in Owosso, becoming something of businessperson and entrepreneur in addition to a lawyer. In about 1890, Miner constructed this simple house on King Street as a family residence.

== Description ==
The Selden Miner House a wood-framed structure with clapboard siding. home for his family on West King Street. Although simple in detailing, the house shows Queen Anne influences, as in the asymmetrical massing and window placement. However, the box-lie proportions distinguish it from the typical Queen Anne residence. The facade's ornamentation is confined to a pediment above the front porch containing woven diamond carving, and decorative carving and fish-scale shingling in the gable ends.
