= William Horton Farmhouse =

- U.S. National Register of Historic Places
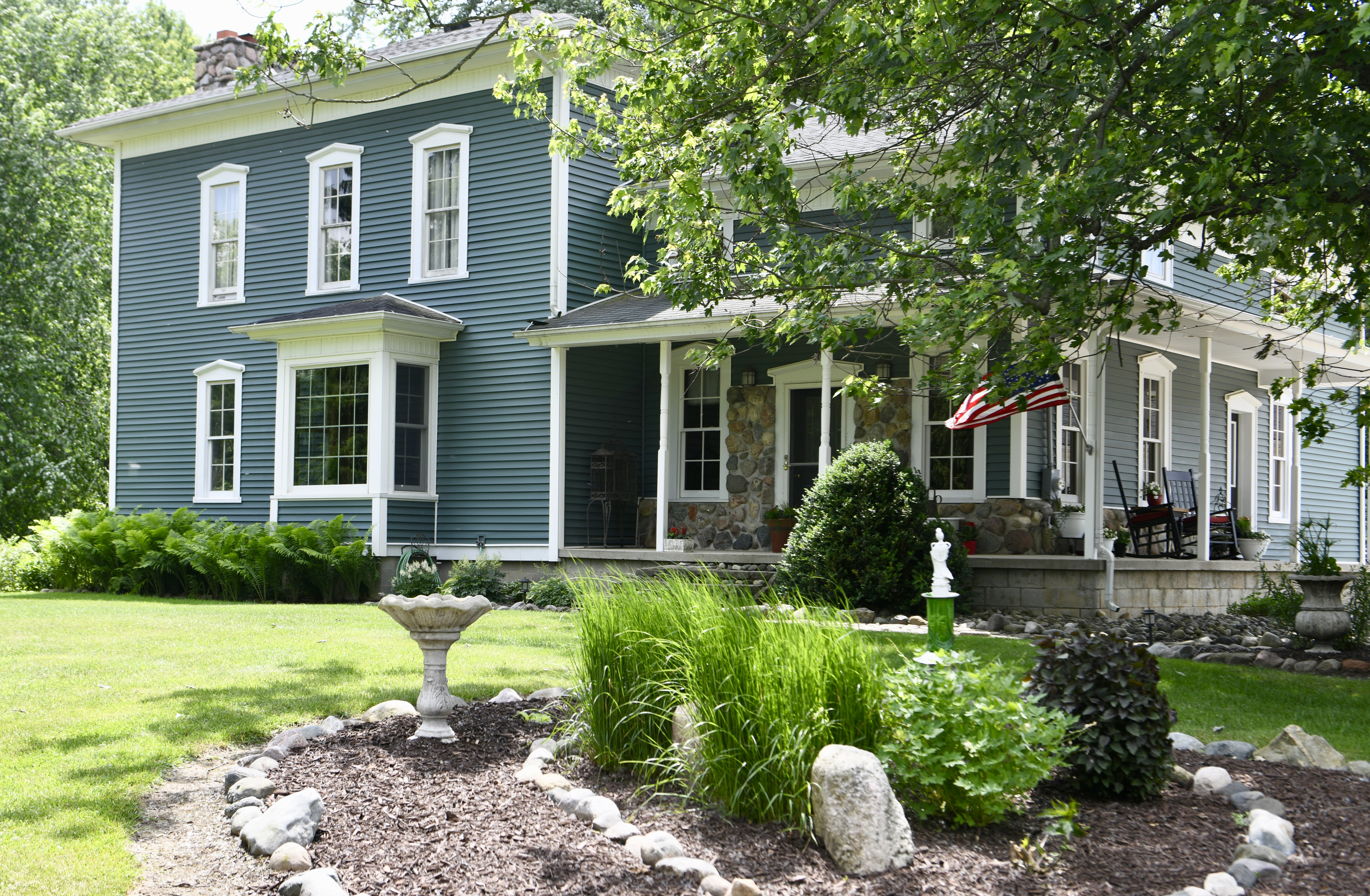
- Interactive map
- Location: 1647 W. Miller Rd., Morrice, Michigan
- Coordinates: 42°51′49″N 84°11′52″W
- Area: less than one acre
- Built: 1870
- Architectural style: Italianate
- NRHP reference No.: 86000711
- Added to NRHP: April 10, 1986

The William Horton Farmhouse is a single family home located at 1647 West Miller Road near Morrice, Michigan. It was listed on the National Register of Historic Places in 1986. It is one of the finest rural Italianate farm homes in the area.

== History ==
In 1837, Alanson Horton moved from Connecticut to Perry, Michigan in Shiawassee County. By 1841, he had purchased a farm and moved his family there, constructing a wood frame Greek Revival house in the mid-1840s. Farming was difficult at first, but by the 1860s, the farm was prosperous, as were the farms and communities in the surrounding county. Alanson's eldest son, William Horton, joined his father in farming the land, but his career was interrupted when he enlisted in the 9th Michigan Volunteer Infantry Regiment during the Civil War. William returned home after the war, and by the late 1860s gained control over his father's farm and house, purchasing the shares that his two brothers and sister had inherited.

William Horton was a successful farmer, concentrating on wheat and cattle, and in 1870 and 1871 he constructed a new farmhouse on the farm. He continued to farm until around 1900, when his eldest son George took over the farm. With wheat becoming less profitable, George Horton turned to sugar beets and beans. George Horton died in 1948, and his eldest son Blain Horton took over the farm. However, small family farms such as the Horton's were becoming less competitive, and Blain soon was working for Fisher Body, and growing corn and hogs part time. By the 1950s, Horton was leasing most of the farmland to other farmers, and in 1978, the house and land were sold out of the family.

== Description ==
The William Horton Farmhouse is a two-story Italianate cube with a one-and-one-half-story side wing. Both sections are wood-framed and covered with clapboard. The two-story section has symmetrically placed four-over-four, double-hung sash windows with pedimented hoods on both the first and second floor levels of all facades, save the first floor of the main facade, which contains a hipped roof, tri-sided bay window with corner pilasters. The side wing is slightly recessed from the front facade. A hipped roof porch wrapping around the front and side facades shelters a main entry door and an additional secondary door on the side. The windows are again four-over-four, double-hung sash units with pedimented hoods.

On the inside, the first floor level contains two parlors, the main stairway, and two smaller rooms that were once used as a sewing room and a nursery. The wing contains a kitchen at the rear and a smaller parlor on the front. The second story contains four bedrooms arranged around the head of the stairway, with several smaller rooms in the half story of the wing.
