= Frederick Frieseke Birthplace and Boyhood Home =

- U.S. National Register of Historic Places
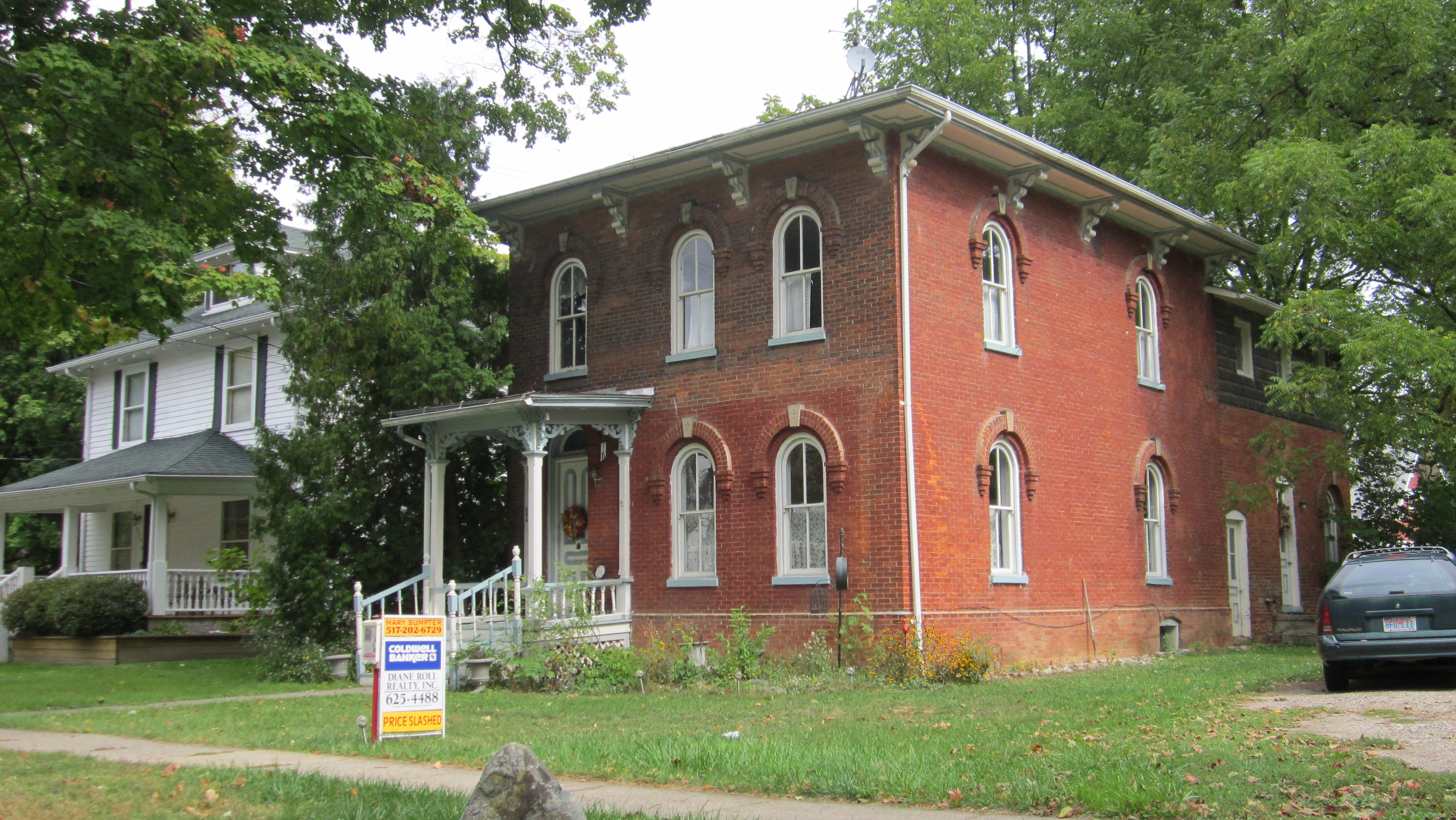
- Interactive map
- Location: 654 N. Water St., Owosso, Michigan
- Coordinates: 43°00′15″N 84°10′23″W
- Area: less than one acre
- Built: 1870
- Architectural style: Italianate
- MPS: Owosso MRA
- NRHP reference No.: 80001895
- Added to NRHP: November 4, 1980

The Frederick Frieseke Birthplace and Boyhood Home is a single-family home in Owosso, Michigan. It was listed on the National Register of Historic Places in 1980.

== History ==
Herman Frieseke and his brother Julius worked in the Owosso brickyards of Charles Shattuck and in the late 1860s purchased the operation. Their yard was a success, and in 1870 Herman could afford to construct a family home. In 1874, his son Frederick Frieseke was born in this house. Frederick showed an aptitude for art at a young age, and his parents sent him to the Art Institute of Chicago after finishing elementary school. He later moved to Paris, studied under Whistler, and was awarded the Chevalier of the Legion of Honor, the highest honor bestowed upon artists by the French state. Frieseke died in 1939 in Paris.

== Description ==
The Frieseke house is a two-story, three-bay brick Italianate structure. It has rounded arch windows with soldier brick voussoirs, brackets along the cornice, and a low hipped roof. The front porch has been altered, and a large concrete block addition was constructed at the rear of the house.
