= George Perrigo House =

- U.S. National Register of Historic Places
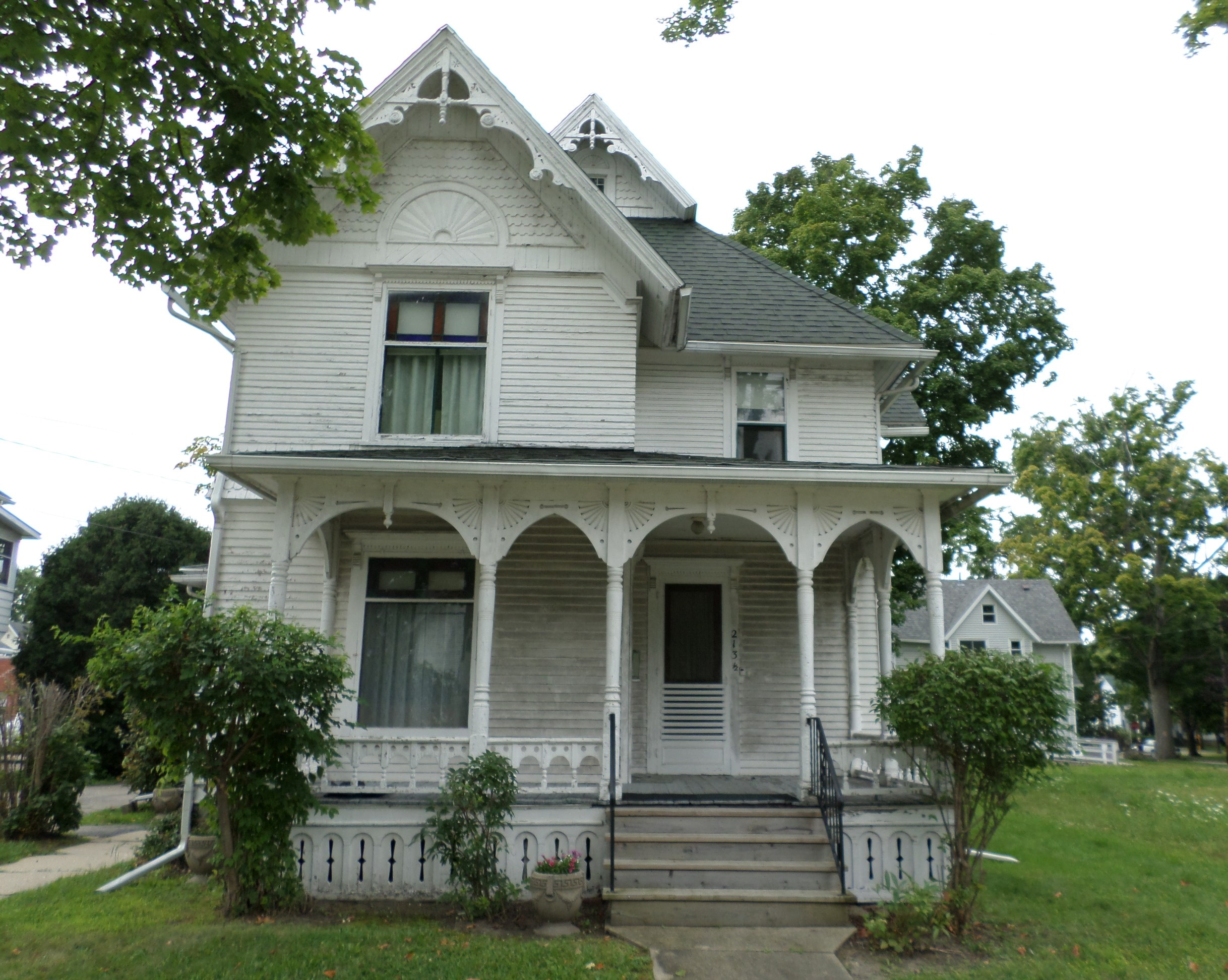
- Interactive map
- Location: 213 N. Cedar St., Owosso, Michigan
- Coordinates: 42°59′56″N 84°10′55″W
- Area: less than one acre
- Built: 1891
- Architect: George Perrigo
- Architectural style: Queen Anne
- MPS: Owosso MRA
- NRHP reference No.: 80001909
- Added to NRHP: November 4, 1980

The George Perrigo House is a single-family home located at 213 North Cedar Street in Owosso, Michigan. It was listed on the National Register of Historic Places in 1980.

== History ==
George Albert Perrigo, was born in Burdett, New York in 1845. His father owned a prosperous foundry and machine shop, but the business was demolished by fire in 1856. Unwilling to rebuild in the same location, the Perrigos to Novi Township in Oakland County, Michigan. As a young man, George Perrigo purchased a farm near Wixom, Michigan. He married Emma Baker in 1869, and became the travelling representative for the Groton Manufacturing Company of Groton, New York, a company specializing in the production of bridges, structural iron, and threshing machinery. Perrigo expanded the Company's sales and established of a Michigan office, located in Owosso. George and Emma Perrigo moved to the city in 1888. There, he designed and constructed this house for his family in 1891. Perrigo continued to work for the Groton Company until 1897, when he founded his own business on bridge building, contracting, and the selling of threshing equipment. In 1901, Perrigo purchased a handle factory in Owosso. Perrigo was also involved in local government, serving two years as an alderman, five years as a member of the Board of Public Works, and seven years as Supervisor.

== Description ==
The Perrigo House is a two story wood-framed Queen Anne house clad in clapboard . It has an asymmetric massing and window location, as well as an irregular roofline. The facade contains Eastlake detailing, providing an eclectic appearance. The front porch contains wooden ornamentation, including a jig-sawed porch apron, an arcaded balustrade with a molded handrailing, spindle-work uprights, and carved fan brackets. Carved fans are also included in the gable ends, along withlacy carved bargeboards.
