= Lyman Woodard Company Workers' Housing =

- U.S. National Register of Historic Places
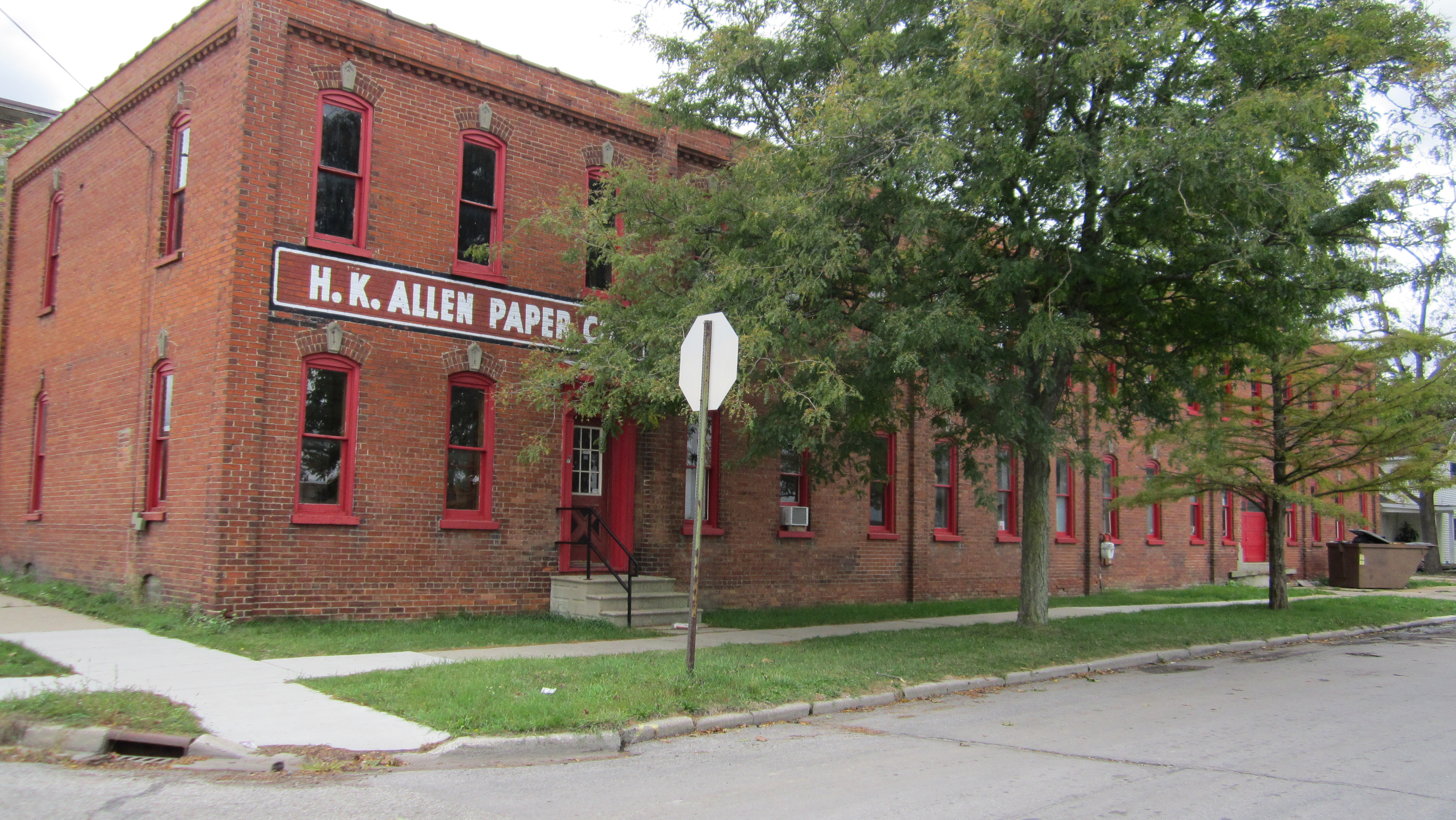
- Interactive map
- Location: 601 Clinton St., Owosso, Michigan
- Coordinates: 42°59′47″N 84°10′43″W
- Area: less than one acre
- Built: 1885
- MPS: Owosso MRA
- NRHP reference No.: 80001916
- Added to NRHP: November 4, 1980

The Lyman Woodard Company Workers' Housing is a former multi-family housing unit located at 601 Clinton Street in Owosso, Michigan. It was listed on the National Register of Historic Places in 1980.

== History ==
In the 1880s, Lyman Woodard relocated his furniture and casket company to this area, building a large factory building and expanding both his product line and workforce. Woodard was in a competition for skilled craftsmen for his factory, and new that the housing market in Owosso was tight. To attract and retain these craftsmen, Woodard also built this multi-family housing unit next door to the factory, for new employees to use until they were able to secure their own home. Although the exact date of construction is unknown, it is similar enough to the 1885 factory building to suggest that it was constructed at nearly the same time.

At some point the building was turned into a commercial space, and now houses the H.K. Allen Paper Company.

== Description ==
The Lyman Woodard Company Workers' Housing is a two-story red brick building, with a balanced window location, containing six units. The windows are one-over-one double hung sash units in bowed arch openings. Brick pilasters are located every three bays of the building, separating the units. A a simple dentilated brick corniceline runs across the top.
