= Benjamin Williams House =

- U.S. National Register of Historic Places
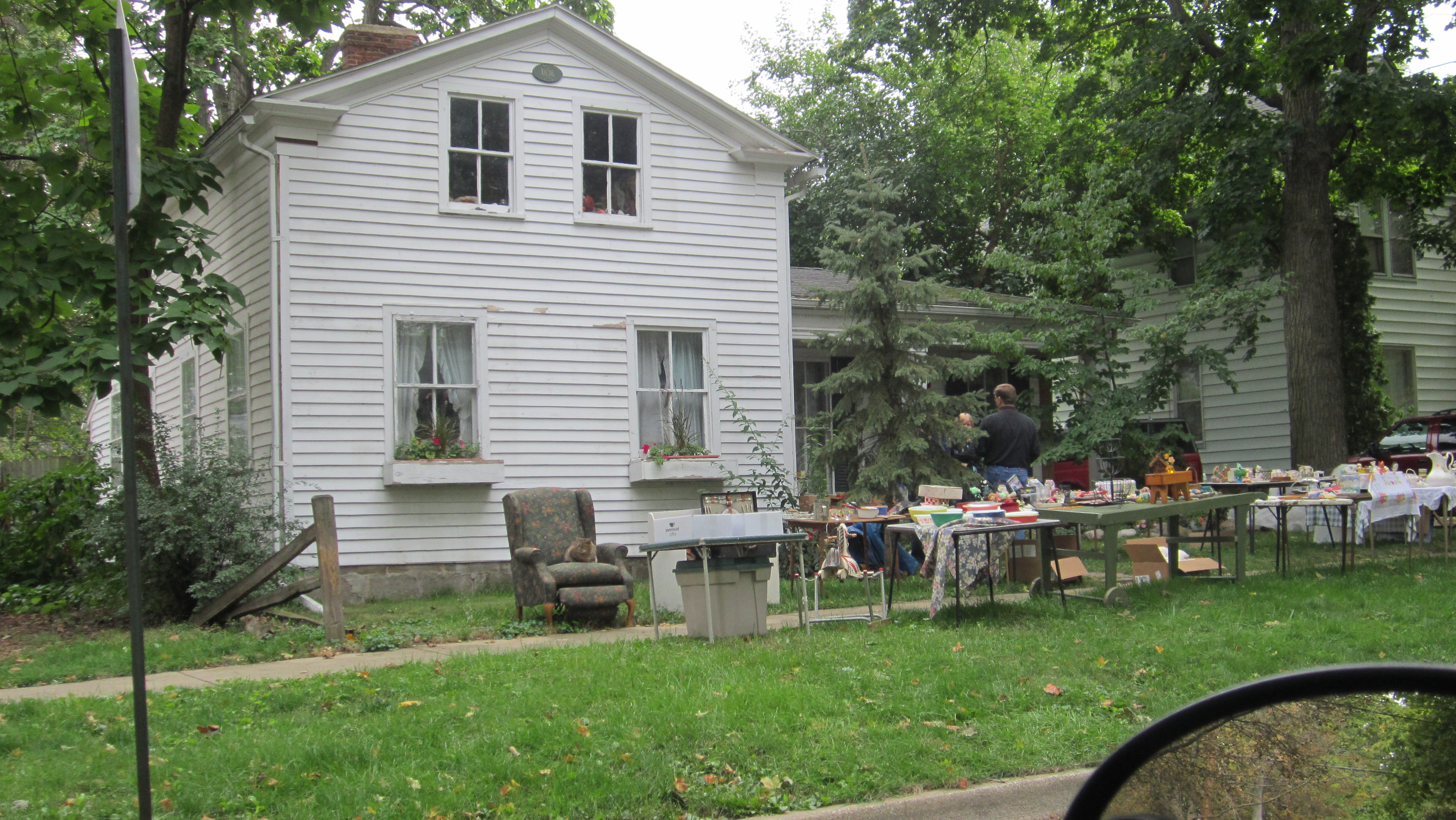
- Interactive map
- Location: 628 N. Ball St., Owosso, Michigan
- Coordinates: 43°00′14″N 84°10′19″W
- Area: 1 acre (0.40 ha)
- Built: 1838
- Built by: Benjamin Williams
- Architectural style: Greek Revival
- MPS: Owosso MRA
- NRHP reference No.: 80001913
- Added to NRHP: November 4, 1980

The Benjamin Oliver Williams House is a single-family home located at 628 North Ball Street in Owosso, Michigan, United States. It was listed on the National Register of Historic Places in 1980.

== History ==
Benjamin O. Williams founded Owosso in 1836 with his brother Alfred (whose house is nearby). The two brothers recruited potential settlers and manufacturers to the area. Benjamin Williams spent the next few years traveling in search of investors, and stayed in temporary quarters when in Owosso. However, in 1838 he built this small house on West Oliver Street as his permanent residence in his town. The home was moved to its current location on Ball Street some time after 1868. The home has also served as the residence of local craftsperson and painter Henry H. Daniels, who purchased the home from Williams some time before 1876, and Daniel's daughter, Nina, and her husband, John Dettwiler.

== Description ==
The Benjamin Williams House is a small L-shaped wood-framed Greek Revival house. It is constructed of hand-hewn beams and clad in clapboard. The main section is two bays wide and two stories high, and features balanced window location and an oddly proportioned corniceline with returns. The side section one story high and has a recessed facade, two-over-two double hung sash windows, and an original glass transom over the front door. It also has an extended porch-like roofline supported by columns and a full entablature.
