= Sylvester Opdyke House =

- U.S. National Register of Historic Places
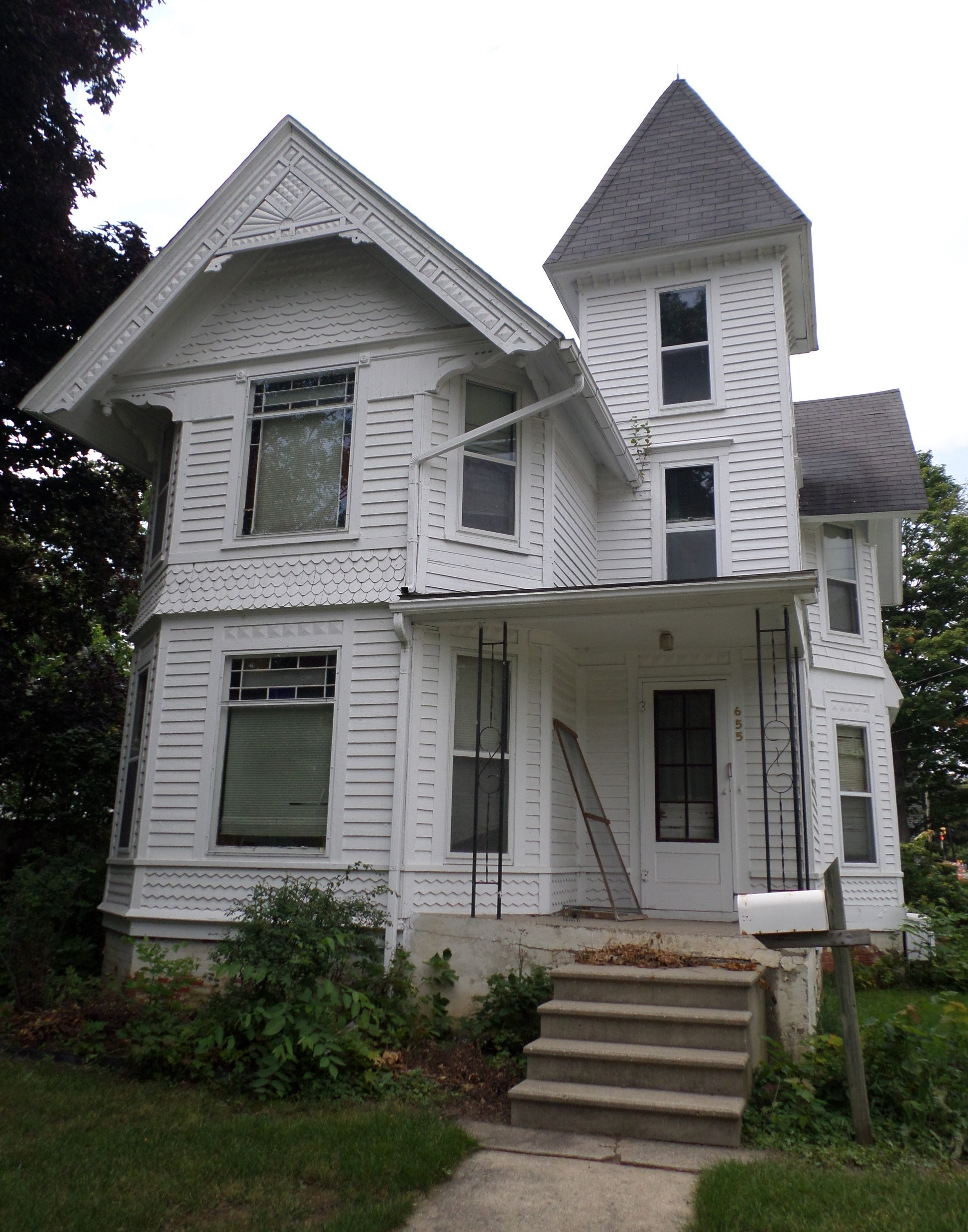
- Interactive map
- Location: 655 N. Pine St., Owosso, Michigan
- Coordinates: 43°00′16″N 84°10′33″W
- Area: less than one acre
- Built: 1892
- Built by: Sylvester Opdyke
- Architectural style: Queen Anne
- MPS: Owosso MRA
- NRHP reference No.: 80001906
- Added to NRHP: November 4, 1980

The Sylvester Opdyke House is a single-family home located at 655 North Pine Street in Owosso, Michigan. It was listed on the National Register of Historic Places in 1980.

== History ==
Sylvester Opdyke was a local builder, and he constructed this house for his family in the early 1890s. In about 1902, the William Boyce family moved in, followed later by the Charles Linzey family. Little more is known about the history of the home.

== Description ==
The Opdyke House is a two-story Queen Anne structure with asymmetrical massing, varied placement, and an irregular roofline. A hip roof tower is located on the corner of the house. The first floor facade contains a variety of one-over-one double hung sash windows accented with stained glass. A scalloped wood bandcourse runs around the base of the superstructure. On the second story are tri-sided bays, with shingled window aprons. The windows also have stained glass accents and carved spandrels.
