= Mason Street Historic Residential District =

- U.S. National Register of Historic Places
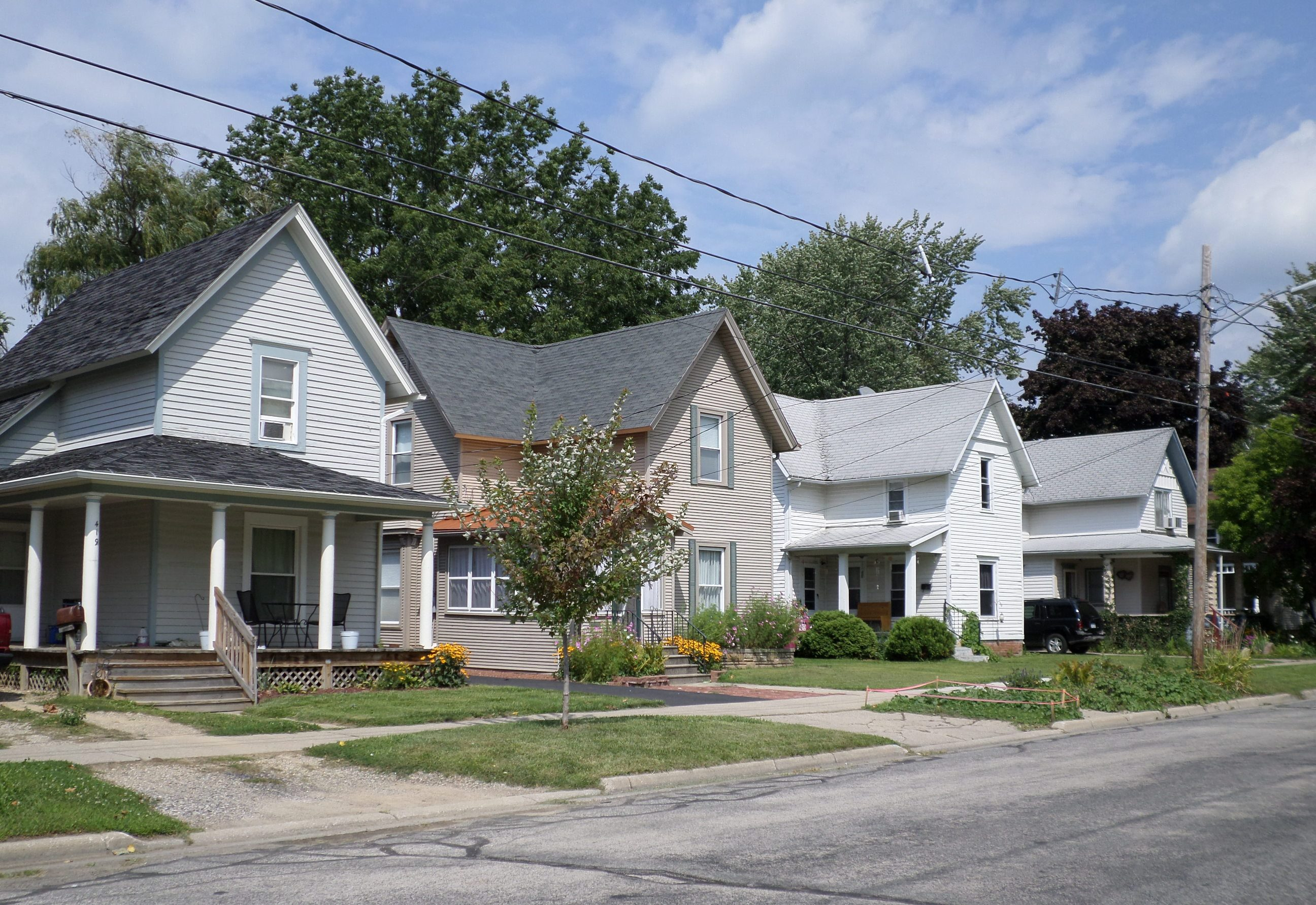
- Interactive map
- Location: Roughly bounded by Laverock Alley, Dewey, Hickory and Exchange Sts., Owosso, Michigan
- Coordinates: 42°59′57″N 84°9′54″W
- Area: 7 acres (2.8 ha)
- Built by: James Laverock
- MPS: Owosso MRA
- NRHP reference No.: 80001900
- Added to NRHP: November 4, 1980

The Mason Street Historic Residential District is a primarily residential historic district located along Mason Street between Dewey and Hickory Streets in Owosso, Michigan. It was listed on the National Register of Historic Places in 1980.

== History ==
The section of land where this district is now located was previously a large, fenced fairground, containing an exhibition building, race track, and judge's tower. However, as the city of Owosso grew, the land became more desirable for other uses. In the early 1890s, builder James Laverock pressed the city to sell him a portion of the fairgrounds. Laverock had previously developed other commercial and residential projects in Owosso, and the city acceded to his request. With his prominent place in the city, he was able to quickly build and sell solid working-class homes along Mason Street. By 1900, the tract along Mason Street was home to a series of working-class families, including a machine shop foreman, a dime store owner, a master mechanic for the Ann Arbor Railroad, several carpenters, the principal of the Owosso Business College, a watch-maker at Christian's Department Store, the proprietor of a book and stationery shop, clerks at Christian's and Duff's Grocery Store, a baker, a carriage painter, an agricultural implements salesman, a railroad brakeman, a janitor, a barber, and several widows.

== Description ==
The Mason Street Historic Residential District is a residential section of Owosso that contains 40 lots developed with modest working-class homes from the 1890s. All but three are one of the three tract housing styles used by James Laverock. The remaining houses were constructed in the early 20th century, and complementary in materials and scale. The houses are primarily located along two blocks of Mason Street, with a few located on the central street, Oak, just north and south of Mason.

Within the three housing styles used by Laverock, individual houses were differentiated by using different styles of wood ornamentation. The first style, used in 19 homes, is a two-story, L-shaped balloon-framed building sheathed in clapboard with a gable roof. These houses have simple balanced fenestration with the main entryway in the recess of the L and a shed-roof front porch. The second style, used in 16 homes, is a two-story rectangular balloon-framed building sheathed in clapboard, again with a gable roof. These homes have a single-story addition in the rear, simple fenestration, and a front entryway. The third style, used in only two homes, is a two-story rectangular balloon-framed building sheathed in clapboard, with a gable roof. These two houses had slightly home complex fenestration and a small front porch.
