= George Pardee House =

- U.S. National Register of Historic Places
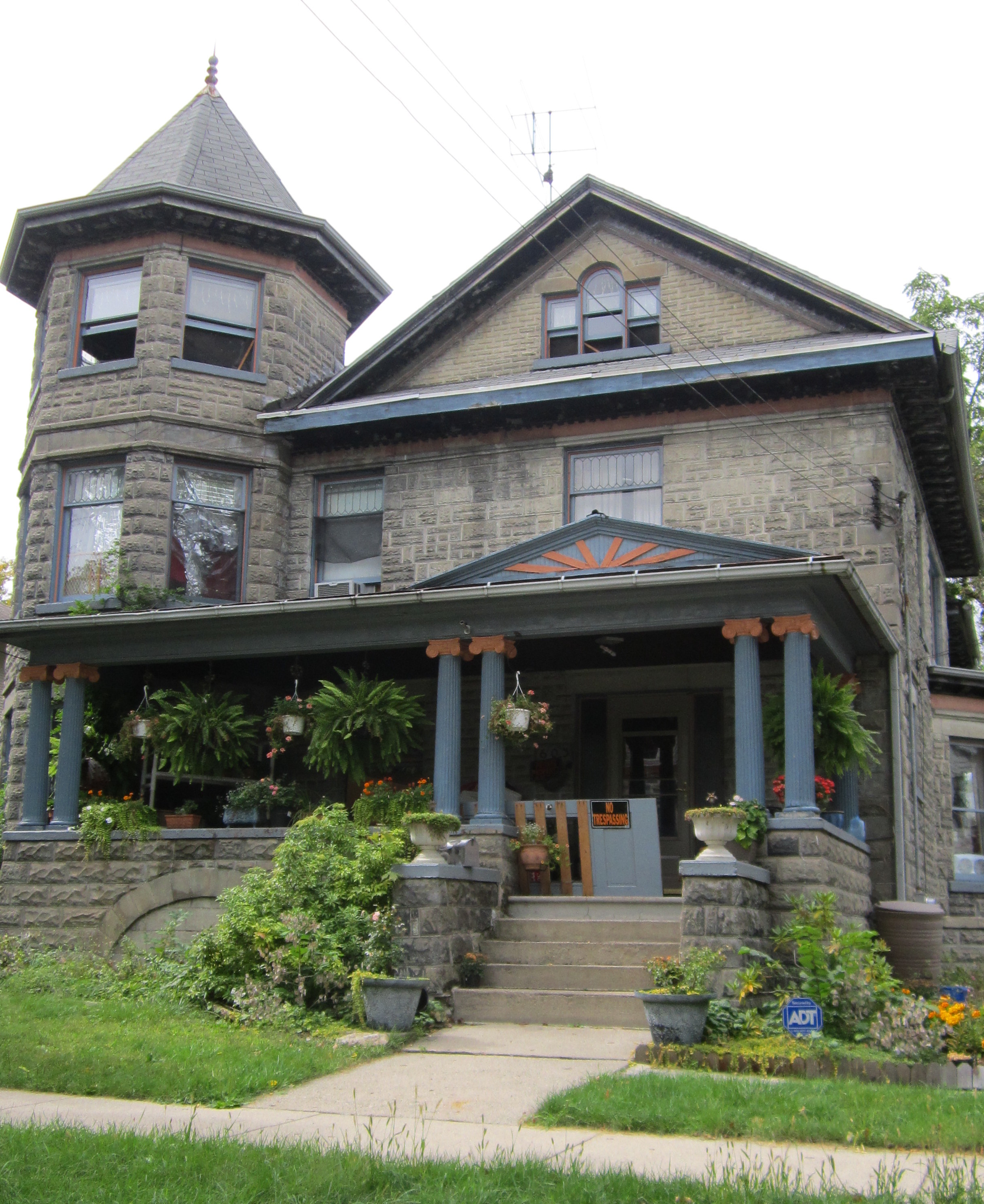
- Interactive map
- Location: 603 N. Ball St., Owosso, Michigan
- Coordinates: 43°00′10″N 84°10′20″W
- Area: less than one acre
- Built: 1906
- Built by: T.H. Bouser
- Architectural style: Eclectic Romanesque Revival
- MPS: Owosso MRA
- NRHP reference No.: 80001908
- Added to NRHP: November 4, 1980

The George Pardee House is a single-family home located at 603 North Ball Street in Owosso, Michigan. It was listed on the National Register of Historic Places in 1980.

== History ==
George Pardee was one of Owosso's most successful lawyers. In 1906, he contracted local builder T. H. Bouser to build this home.

== Description ==
The Pardee House is an eclectic Romanesque Revival-inspired building with an elaborately gabled roofline. The facade is of rough-faced poured concrete block with heavy stone lintels and bandcourses. The massive front porch has Ionic columns and a rounded arch entryway. On one corner of the house is a five-sided, three story tower. The gable ends are deeply recessed, and contain classically-inspired Palladian windows. Other windows in the face contain leaded glass diamond insets.
