= Edwin Todd House =

- U.S. National Register of Historic Places
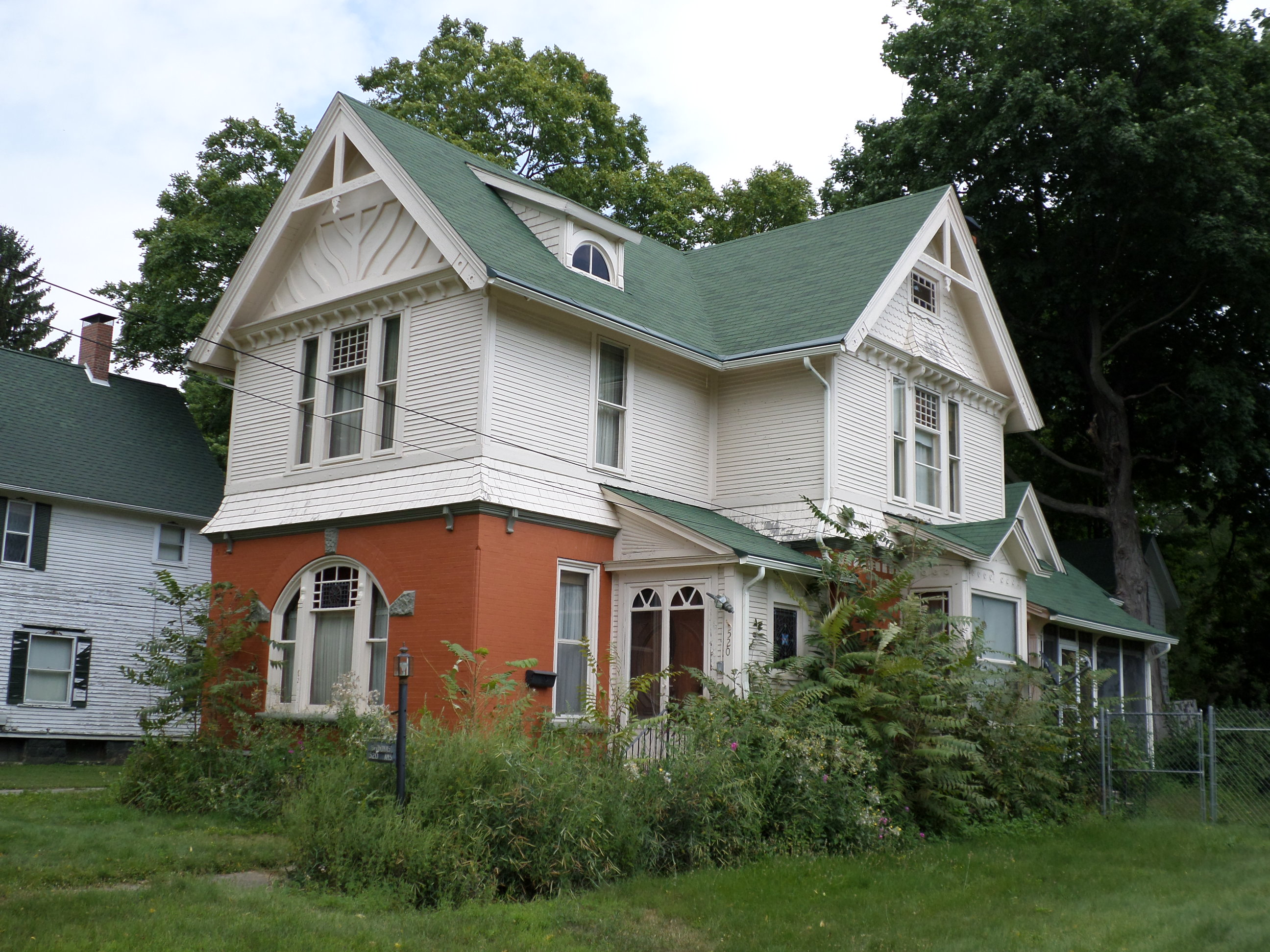
- Interactive map
- Location: 520 N. Adams St., Owosso, Michigan
- Coordinates: 43°00′10″N 84°10′28″W
- Area: less than one acre
- Built: 1890
- Architectural style: Queen Anne
- MPS: Owosso MRA
- NRHP reference No.: 80001910
- Added to NRHP: November 4, 1980

The Edwin Todd House is a single-family home located at 520 North Adams Street in Owosso, Michigan, United States. It was listed on the National Register of Historic Places in 1980.

== History ==
Along with Amos Gould and Alfred William, Edwin Todd invested in the Amboy, Lansing, and Traverse Bay Railroad Company, which opened its rail line from Owosso to Lansing in 1862. Although initially shaky, the line proved a financial success, and Todd earned enough money to begin investing in other enterprises. He soon had a stake in a number of saw mills, wool carding companies, and other industries in Owosso. Around 1890, he constructed this fine residence for his family.

== Description ==
The Todd House is a two-story Queen Anne brick and clapboard residence, with asymmetrical massing and an irregular roofline. The facade uses a wide variety of finishes and ornamentation. The first floor contains a large rounded arch window, topped with a brick voussoir and limestone keystones. A carved fan half-pediment is placed above the front entry, and there are carved rising-sun and star details in the baseboard. The second story contains a shingled bandcourse, clapboard siding, and a bracketed cornice line. The gable ends above contain half-timbering, carved bargeboards, and small gable windows with stained glass.
