= Alfred Williams House =

- U.S. National Register of Historic Places
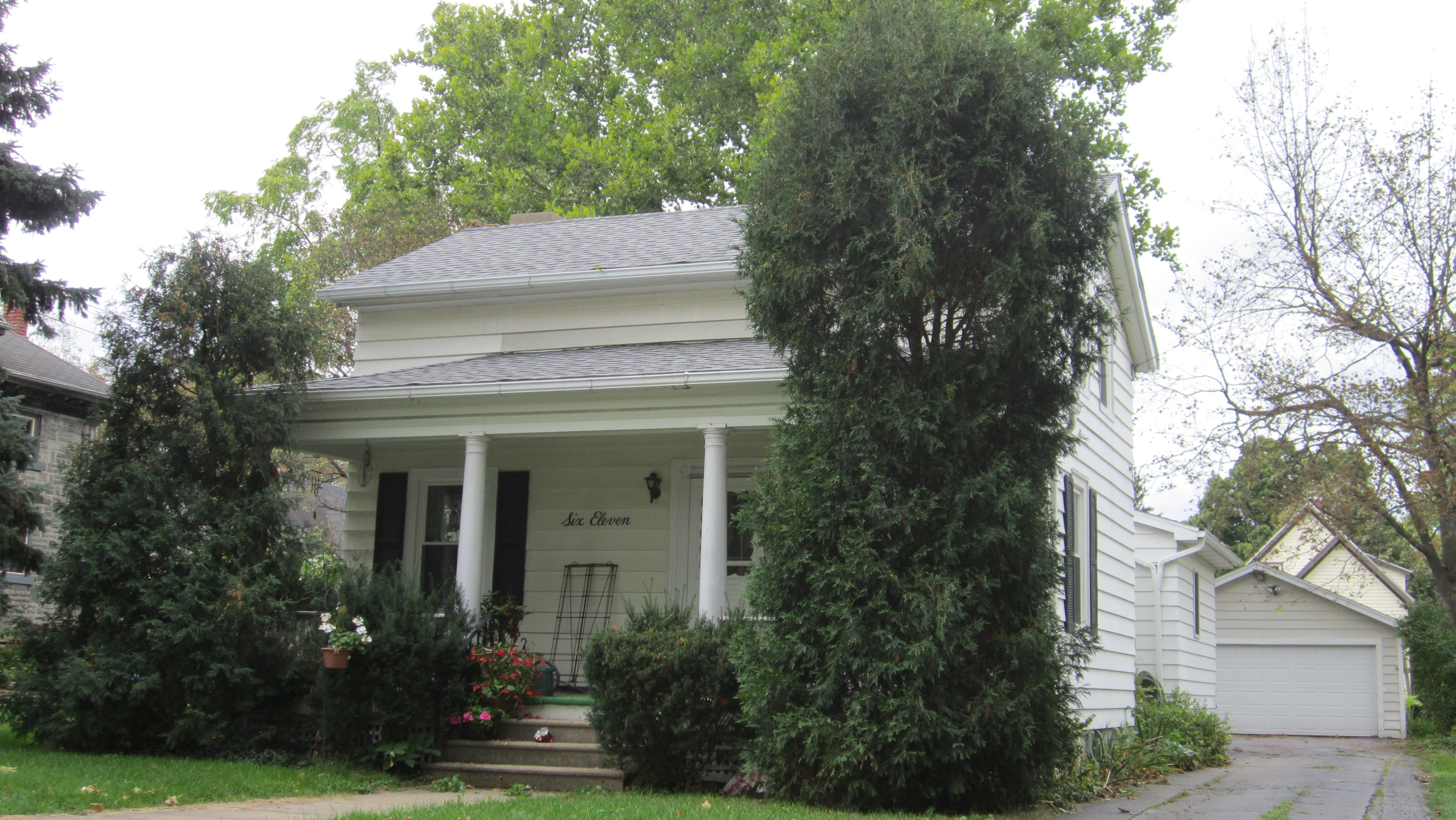
- Interactive map
- Location: 611 N. Ball St., Owosso, Michigan
- Coordinates: 43°00′12″N 84°10′20″W
- Area: less than one acre
- Built: 1838
- Architectural style: Greek Revival
- MPS: Owosso MRA
- NRHP reference No.: 80001912
- Added to NRHP: November 4, 1980

The Alfred Williams House is a single-family home located at 611 North Ball Street in Owosso, Michigan. It was listed on the National Register of Historic Places in 1980.

== History ==
Alfred L. Williams and his brother Benjamin (whose house is nearby) were early settlers of Owosso, and established the city as a destination for residents and manufacturers. Alfred started the first general store in Owosso, the Williams Brothers Trading Post. He also dammed the Shiawassee River in 1836, and arranged to build a millrace to channel the water power and establish the town's first mills. Between 1838 and 1840, Williams constructed this small frame house on Oliver Street as his first permanent residence in Owosso. It was moved to the present location some time around 1900.

== Description ==
The Williams House is a small three bay, one-and-one-half story Greek Revival structure. It is framed using hand-hewn beams, and covered in clapboard. The house has no ornamentation save a front a porch that was added when the structure was moved to its present location.
