= House at 314 W. King St. =

- U.S. National Register of Historic Places
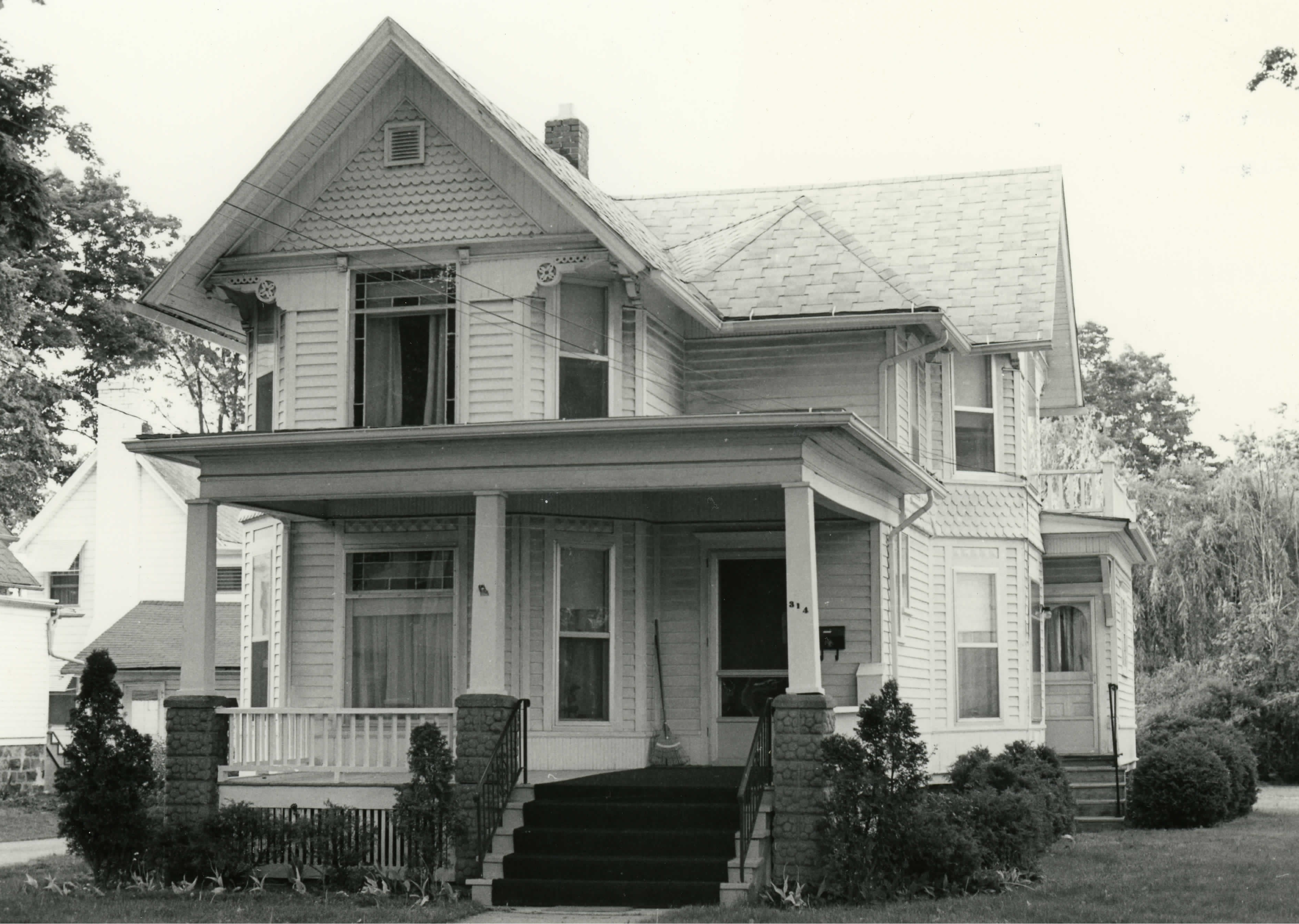
- House at 314 W. King Street in 1980
- Interactive map
- Location: 314 W. King St., Owosso, Michigan
- Coordinates: 43°00′18″N 84°10′26″W
- Area: less than one acre
- Built: 1890
- Architectural style: Queen Anne
- MPS: Owosso MRA
- NRHP reference No.: 80001899
- Added to NRHP: November 4, 1980

The House at 314 W. King Street was a single-family home located in Owosso, Michigan. It was listed on the National Register of Historic Places in 1980.

== History ==
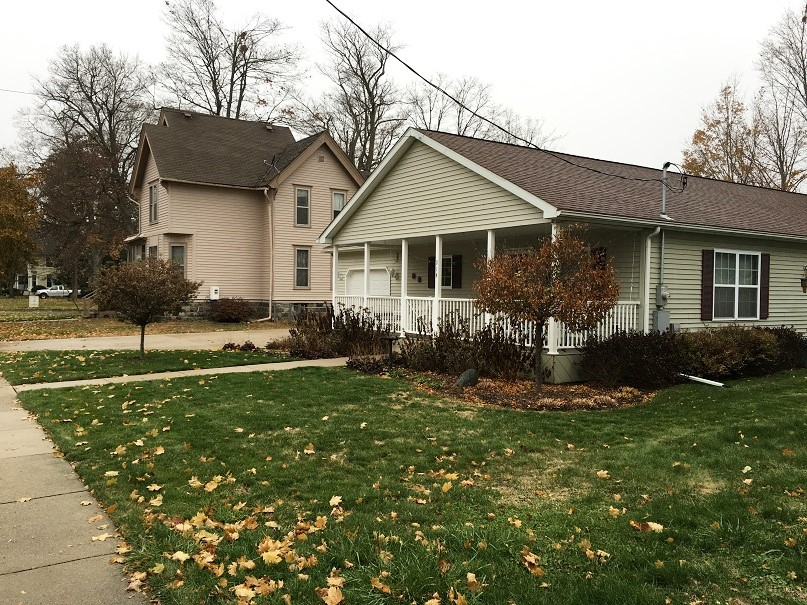
Former location of House at 314 W. King Street in 2017

The House at 314 W. King Street was constructed in 1890, and reflects a time of growth in the city of Owosso. It was presumably demolished some time between 1980 and 2017.

== Description ==
The House at 314 W. King Street was a two-story clapboard Queen Anne-style structure. It had asymmetrical massing and fenestration, a varied roofline, and a broad porch typical of the Queen Anne style. The house had a wide variety of surfaces used on the facades, including tongue-and-groove on the entire base of the wood superstructure, clapboard on most of the facades, fish-scale shingling on the gables, vertical panelling on the underside of the overhanging eaves, and diamond carved wood lintels over the windows. On the front facade, there was a tri-sided bay, with a stained glass center window surrounded by decorative spandrels.
