= Michigan Avenue-Genesee Street Historic Residential District =

- U.S. National Register of Historic Places
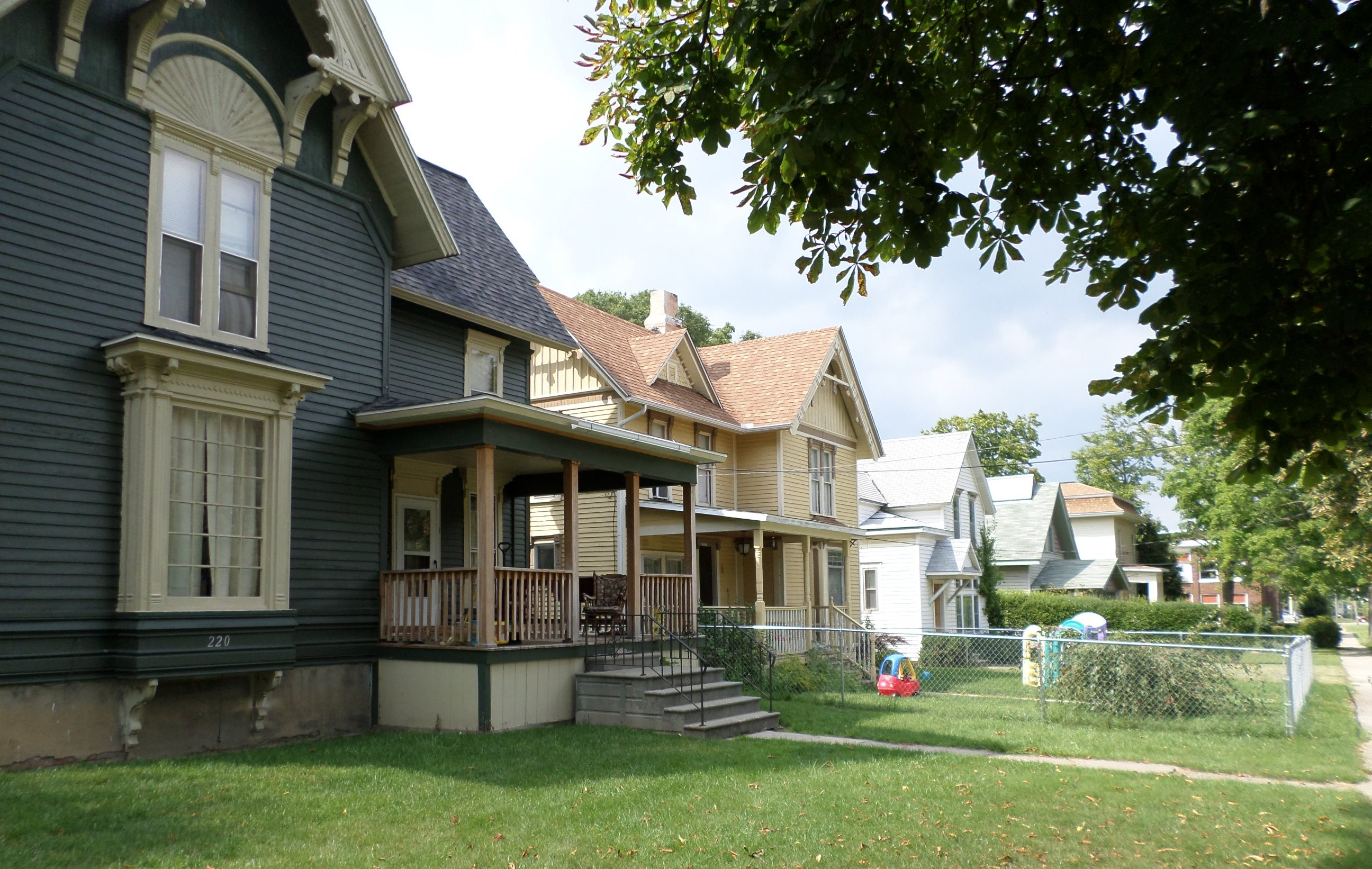
- Interactive map
- Location: Roughly bounded by Michigan Ave.; Shiawassee, Cass and Clinton Sts., Owosso, Michigan
- Coordinates: 42°59′43″N 84°10′32″W
- Area: 9 acres (3.6 ha)
- Architectural style: Greek Revival, Italianate, Queen Anne
- MPS: Owosso MRA
- NRHP reference No.: 80001902
- Added to NRHP: November 4, 1980

The Michigan Avenue-Genesee Street Historic Residential District is a primarily residential historic district, located along Michigan Ave between Clinton Street and the railroad tracks, and along Genesee Street from Michigan Avenue to Shiawassee Street in Owosso, Michigan. It was listed on the National Register of Historic Places in 1980.

== History ==
The Michigan Avenue-Genesee Street District was developed in the latter half of the nineteenth century, as new businesses were developed in Owosso and fine craftsmen moved to the city. The district was located near the newly-established factories, and close to the booming commercial district, so both shopkeepers and craftsmen found the neighborhood a convenient place to live. As the neighborhood attracted a varied group of residents, the houses constructed embraced a range of sizes and styles. However, despite the heterogeneity of the buildings, they all exhibited fine craftsmanship. The quality of the houses ensured that the neighborhood lasted, well-cared-for, into the present day.

== Description ==
The streets of the Michigan Avenue-Genesee Street neighborhood are narrow and some sections display brick pavers. The neighborhood is completely residential, containing residences of a modest size but architecturally sophisticated. The district contains 32 properties, all but one of which were constructed in the 19th century. Although a few Greek Revival houses are in the district, most houses reflect later styles, including Carpenter Gothic, Italianate, Queen Anne, Eastlake, and Georgian Revival styles.

== Significant Houses ==
The significant houses in the neighborhood include:

- Eli Gregor Residence (416 Genesee): This house, originally built in about 1860, is the oldest remaining structure in the neighborhood. The older portion of the home is a two story, three bay Greek Revival structure covered in clapboard. It has a gable roof, and porches on both the first and second floor. In the mid-1870s, Eli Gregory, then mayor of Owosso, added a 1-1/2 story French Second Empire section to the home.
- North-Rigley Residence (220 Michigan): This house was first home to Granville North, part-owner of a furniture company. In about 1890, North sold it to Charles Rigley, president of the Estey Manufacturing Company. The house is a two-story, L-shaped Queen Anne home covered in clapboard.
- Louis Hall Residence (304 Michigan): Businessman and grocer Louis Hall built this family home in 1893. It is a mix of Queen Anne And Georgian Revival styles, with an asymmetrical floorplan and facade. It is covered with clapboard, shingling, and tongue-in-groove siding. The front porch is supported by Ionic columns.
- Samuel Gardner Residence (314 Michigan): This house is a modestly scaled but elaborately detailed Eastlake-style residence, constructed in about 1885. It has elaborate ornamentation around the windows and in the gable ends. A series of skilled craftspeople, managers, and businesspeople lived in this house; the first known of these is Samuel Gardner, who moved in some time before 1895.
