= Oliver Street Historic District =

- U.S. National Register of Historic Places
- U.S. Historic district
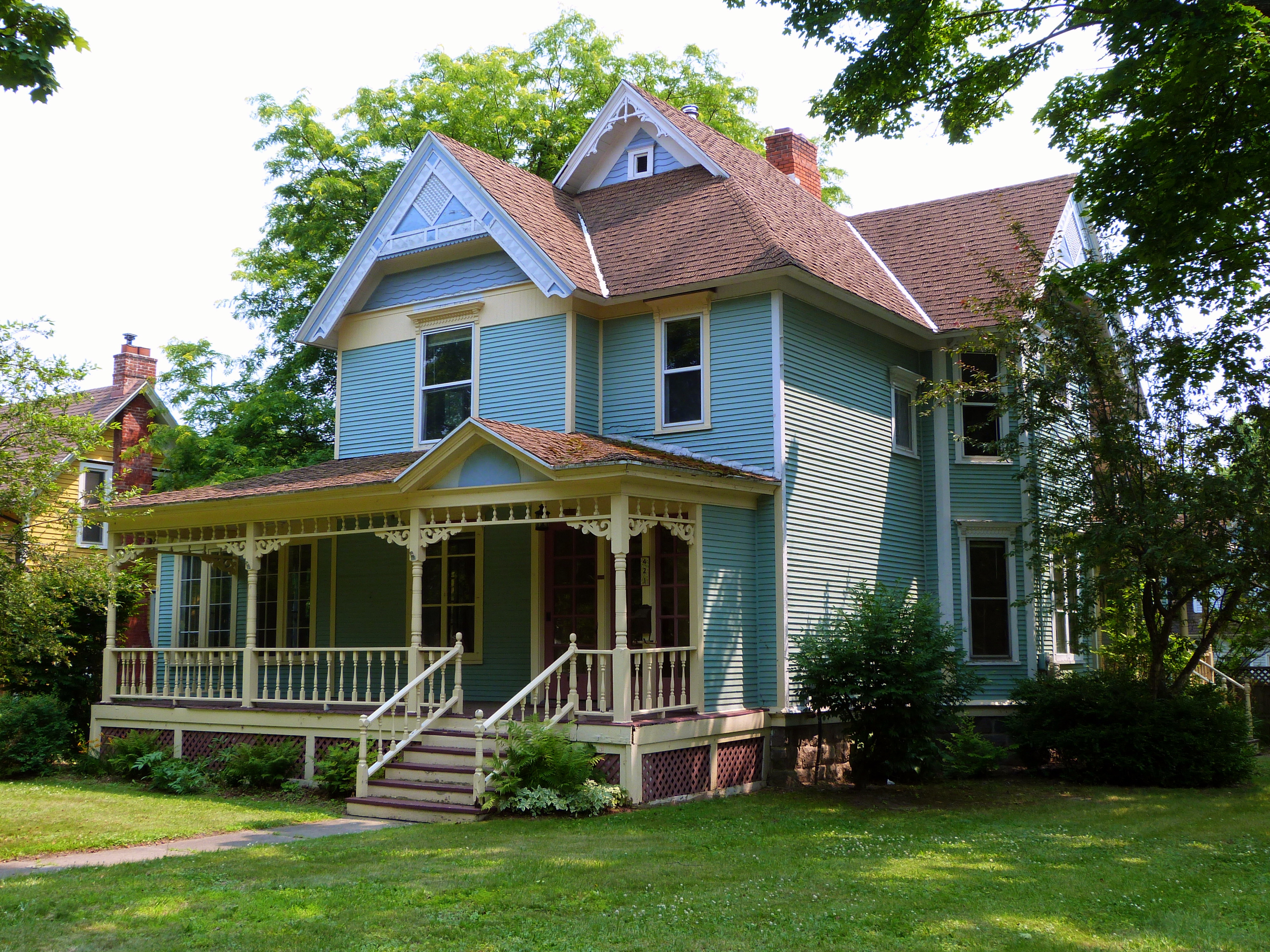
- Bigelow-Dewey House

- Location within Michigan Location within the United States
- Interactive map
- Location: Oliver St. between 3rd and Oak Sts., Williams and Goodhue Sts., Owosso, Michigan
- Coordinates: 43°0′6″N 84°10′24″W
- Area: 58 acres (23 ha)
- Architect: Multiple
- Architectural style: Greek Revival, Italianate, Queen Anne
- MPS: Owosso MRA
- NRHP reference No.: 80001905
- Added to NRHP: November 4, 1980

The Oliver Street Historic District is a primarily residential historic district, located along Oliver Street between Third and Oak Street, as well as some adjacent sections of Williams and Goodhue Streets, in Owosso, Michigan. It was listed on the National Register of Historic Places in 1980.

== History ==
Even when originally settled, the Oliver Street neighborhood was home to Owosso's most prominent families. The first houses constructed in the area were built in 1838 and 1840 by the pioneering Williams brothers. Development continued along Oliver Street throughout the 1800s, and up until the start of the Great Depression.

== Description ==
The breadth of time over which the houses along Oliver Street were built produced a wide array of architectural styles, including Greek Revival, Italianate, Queen Anne, Gothic Revival, French Second Empire, Romanesque, Carpenter Gothic, Eastlake, Georgian Revival, Colonial Revival, Tudor Revival, and Dutch Revival, as well as an array of eclectic combinations of styles. The neighborhood contains 122 properties, 114 of which are residential, with seven of the remaining being churches.

There are a number of significant individual properties within the district. These include:

- Josiah Turner Residence - 105 Goodhue Street. Two story, wood-framed and clapboard Greek Revival house constructed in 1856 for Judge Josiah Turner.
- Christ Episcopal Church - Fayette Square. Red brick structure Romanesque church built in 1859. Several additions have been made over the years.
- Ebenezer Gould Residence - 419 North Shiawassee Street. Brick Italianate residence constructed in 1860 for Ebenezer Gould, Owosso's first merchant.
- Goodhue-Christian Residence - 302 West Oliver Street. This brick Italianate home was built around 1860 for the Goodhues, one of the City's major dry-goods businesses. It was later converted into apartments, but just after 1900 Daniel Christian, founder of Christian's Department Store, purchased it and restored it to single-family use.
- Amos Gould Residence - 515 North Washington Street. Some time before 1860, Amos Gould built an original home on this property, using a simple style executed in wood and stucco. In 1873, he remodeled the house into an elaborate Italianate residence. The original servant's quarters, now known as the Amos Gould House, have been moved.
- William Fletcher Residence - 118 East Oliver Street. Italian Villa style home built in 1874 for William Fletcher, who established one of Owosso's most successful grist mills.
- Guerdon Dimmick Residence and Carriage house - 713 West Oliver Street. Italian Villa constructed in 1876 for real estate speculator Guerdon L. Dimmick.
- McHardy-Kincaid Residence - 115-117 Goodhue Street. Brick Gothic Revival structure built in 1885 for hardware store owner Arthur McHardy.
- Alvin Bentley Residence - 805 West Oliver Street. French Second Empire house built in 1893 for Alvin M. Bentley, owner of the Owosso Tool Company.
- James Colby Residence - 406 East Oliver Street. Flamboyant Queen Anne house constructed in 1881 for James Singer Colby, a nephew of Isaac Merritt Singer, the inventor of the first affordable sewing machine.
- Bruce Buckminster Residence - 426 North Washington Street. This site originally housed Owosso's First Baptist Church, from 1859 to 1875. In the 1880s, well-to-do farmer Bruce Buckminster purchased the site and cleared it to construct of a residence.
- Frain-Brewer-Fortman Residence - 502 West Oliver Street. Built c. 1890, this Queen Anne residence was home to H. H. Frain, a local blacksmith.
- James Osburn Residence - 527 North Washington Street. Queen Anne house built in 1893 by James Osburn, whose family owned a dry-goods store in Owosso.
- Graham-Bigelow Residence - 522 West Oliver Street. A c. 1890 Eastlake-inspired building spliced onto a c. 1870 French Second Empire building. The earlier building was constructed by Amos Gould for his sister, Villetta Gould Graham.
- Drake- Scofield Residence - 321 West Williams Street. Built by Sidney R. Drake in the 1890s, this was also home to Stephen Scofield, owner of Owosso's Yellow Cab Company during the 1920s.
- William Bigelow Residence /Thomas Dewey BOYHOOD HOME - 421 West Oliver Street. Home built for pharmacist William H. Bigelow in 1898. In 1914, postmaster George Martin Dewey and his wife Annie moved here with their family, including their son Thomas Dewey.
- Frederick Smith Residence - 403 West Oliver Street. Home built for undertaker Frederick Smith in 1915.
- Lee Woodard Residence - 825 West Oliver Street. Red brick Georgian Revival home built in 1918 for Lee Lyman Woodard, owner of the Woodard Furniture and Casket Company.
- James Curwood Residence - 508 West Williams Street. Brick Georgian Revival home in 1910 for author James Oliver Curwood, whose writing studio, known as the "Curwood Castle", is located two blocks away.
- Calvin Bentley Residence - 621 West Oliver Street. Tudor Revival house built in the mid-1920s for Calvin Bentley, son of A. M. Bentley who founded the Owosso Manufacturing Company.

== Gallery ==
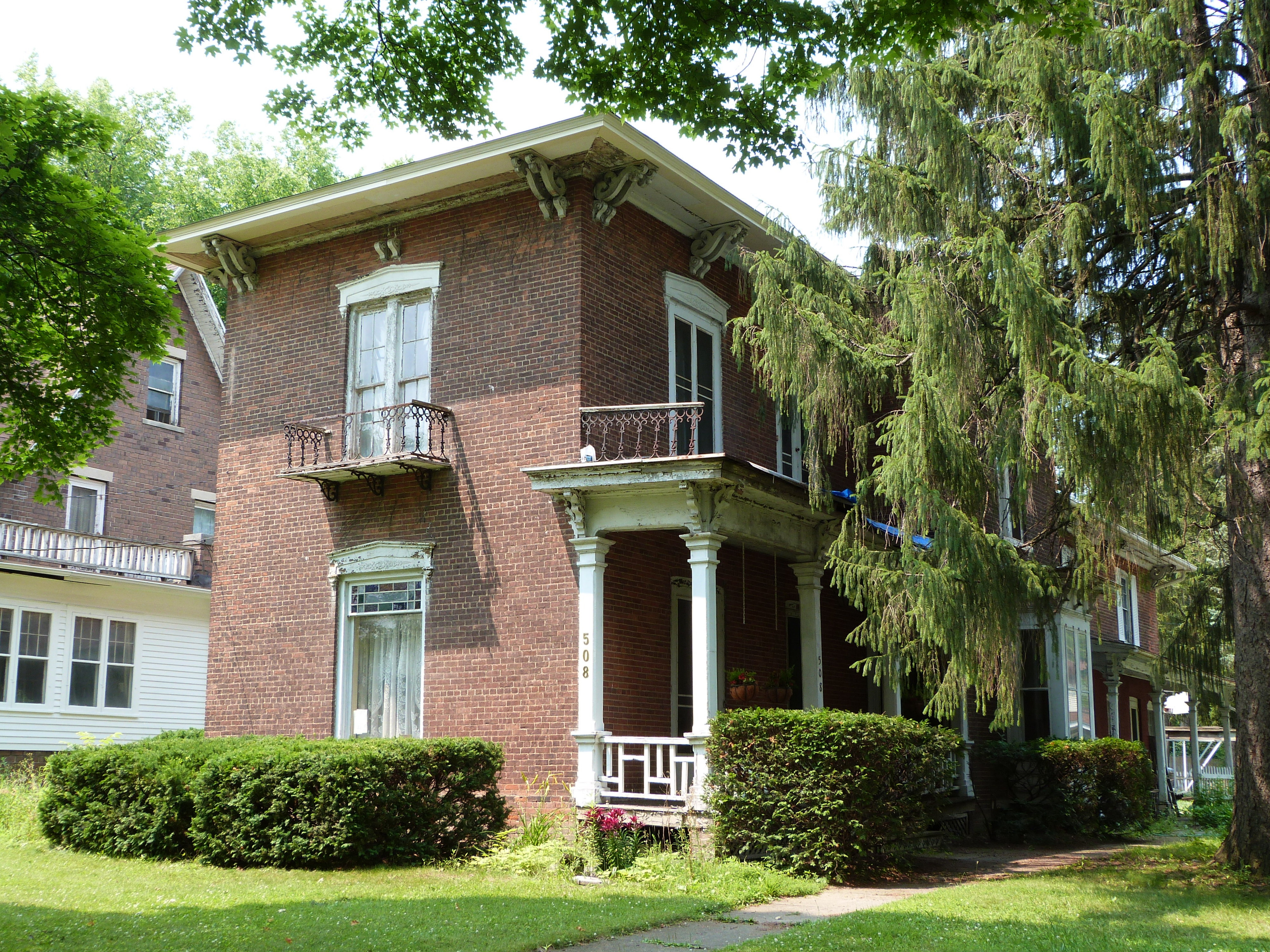
508 W Oliver St

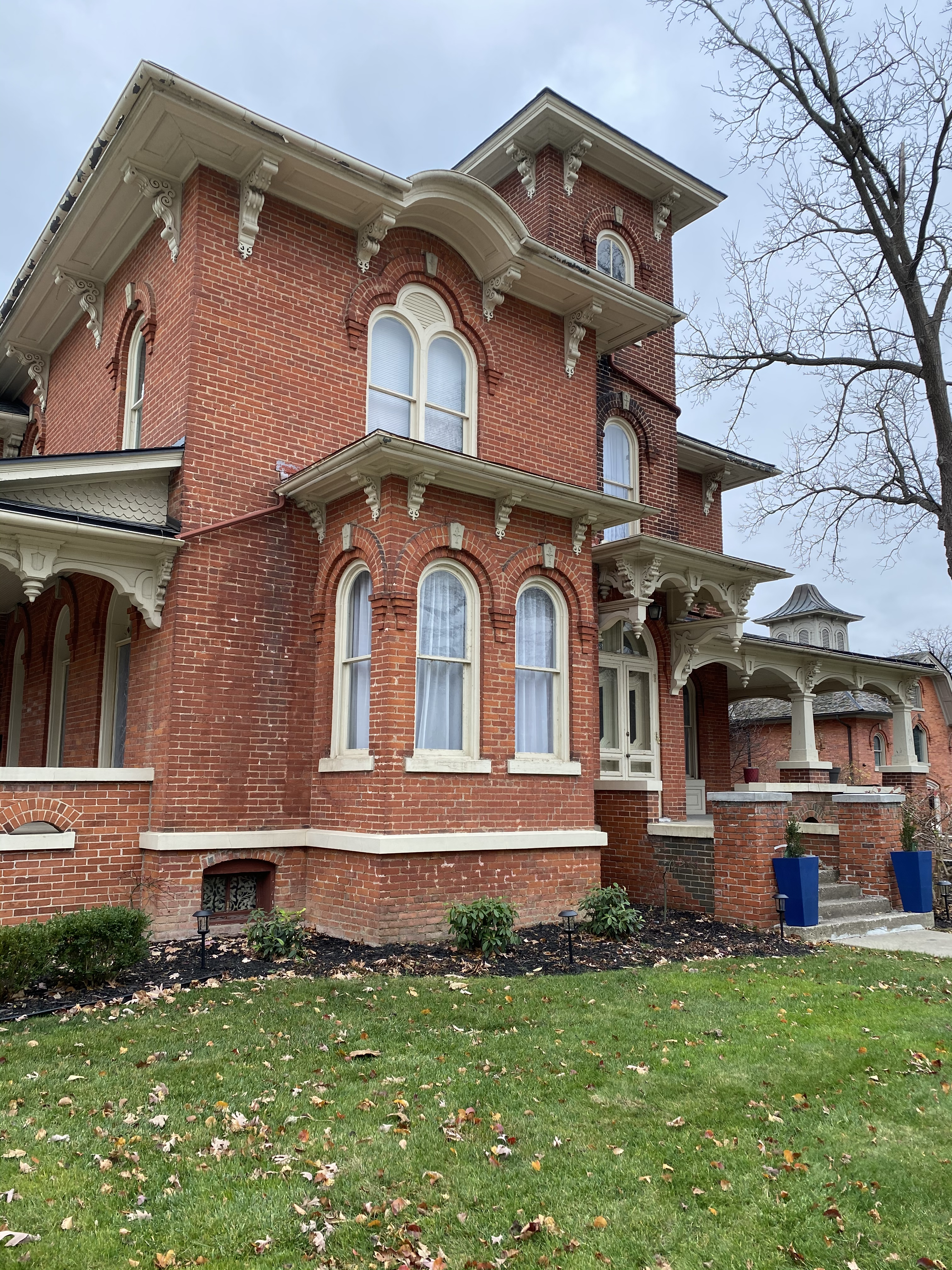
713 W Oliver St

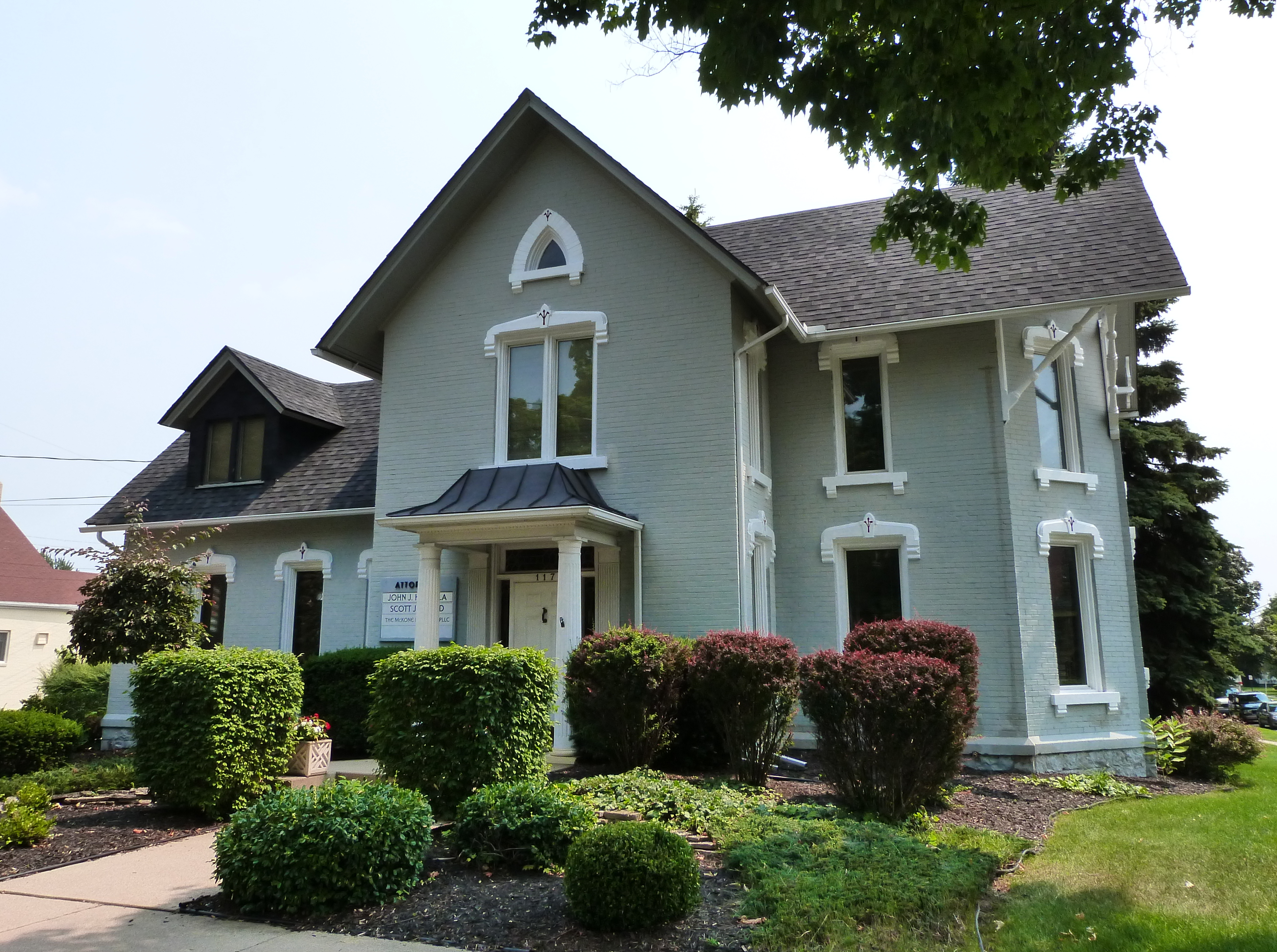
First Methodist Church Parish House

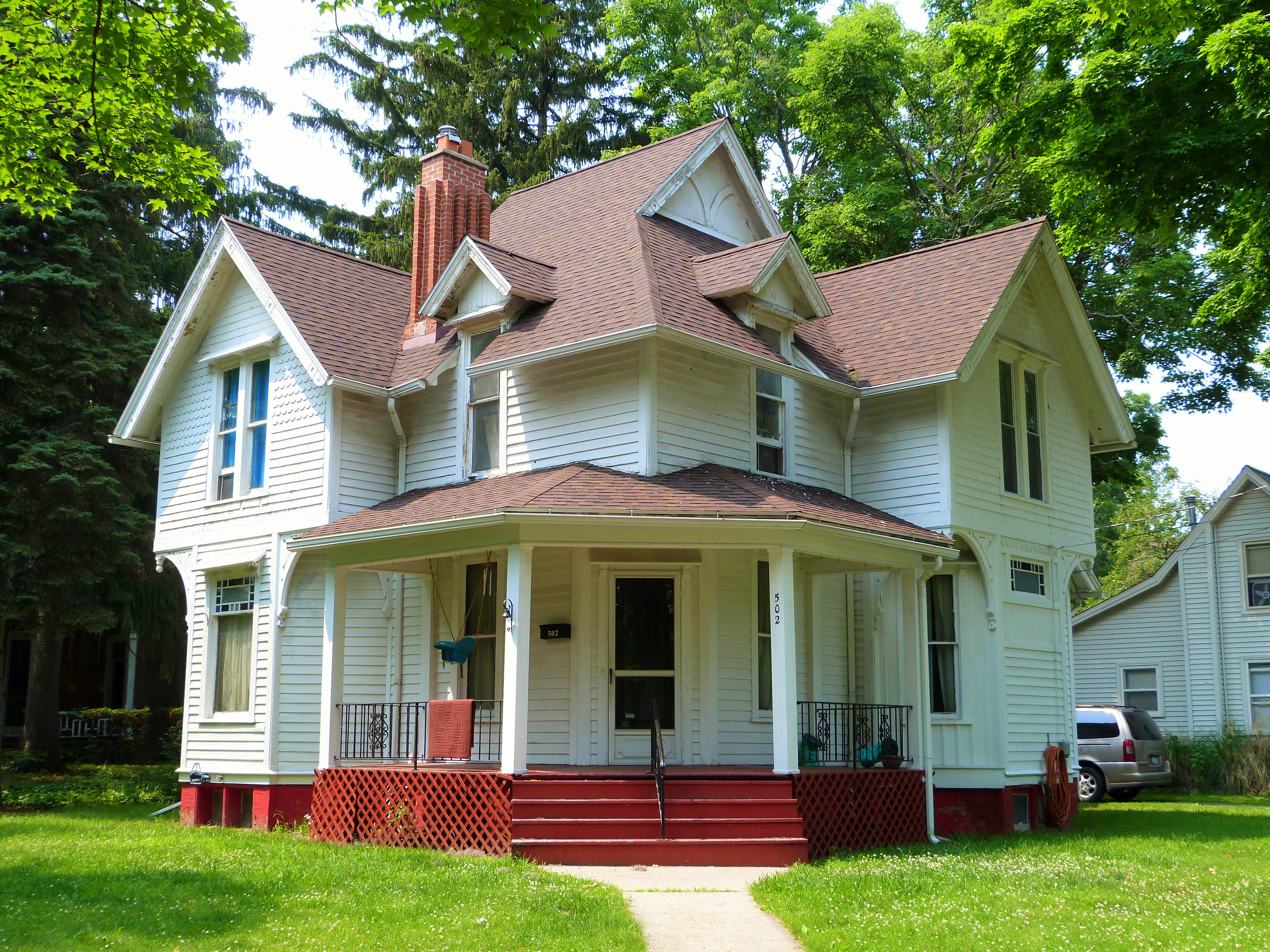
Frain-Brewer-Fortman House

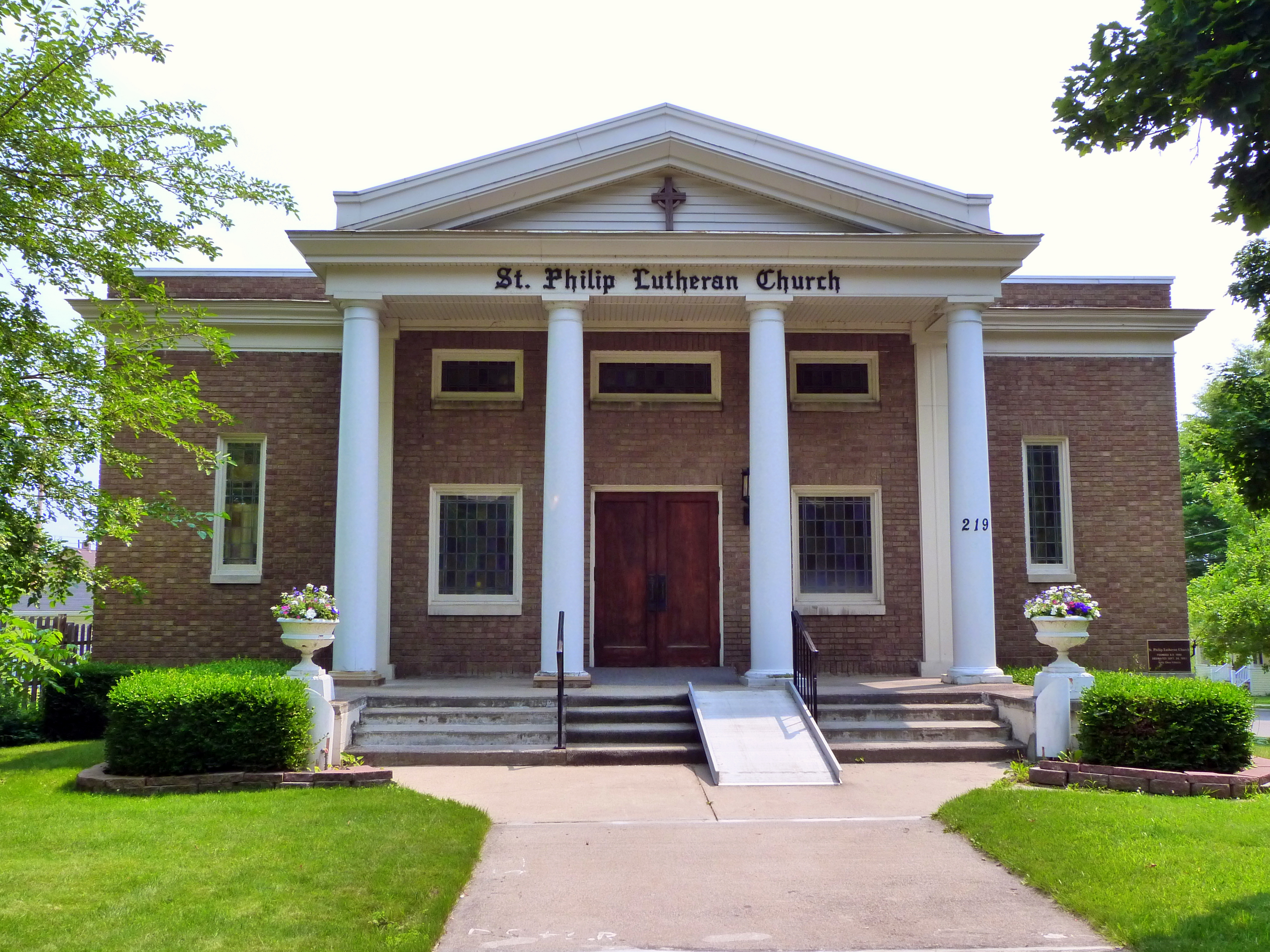
St Philip Lutheran Church
