= Duff (surname) =

The surname Duff has several origins. In some cases, it is an Anglicised form of the Gaelic Ó Duibh ("descendant of Dubh"), Mac Giolla Duibh ("son of the servant of Dubh"), Mac Duibh ("son of Dubh"). The surname Duff is also sometimes a short form of Duffin (when of Gaelic origin), and MacElduff (from Mac Giolla Duibh), and Duffy (a name with multiple origins).

The Gaelic dubh ("black", "dark") is a word-element which forms a part of several Gaelic names.

Le Duff is the gallicized variant of the Breton surname An Du which means The Black.

== People ==
- Alan Duff (born 1950), New Zealand writer
- Alexander Duff (missionary) (1806–1878), founder of Scottish Church College, Calcutta
- Alexander Duff (Royal Navy officer) (1862–1933), British admiral
- Andrew Duff (born 1950), British politician
- Anne Macintosh Duff (1925–2022), Canadian watercolor artist
- Anne-Marie Duff (born 1970), British actress
- Antony Duff (1920–2000), past head of MI5
- Antony Duff (philosopher) (born 1945), British philosopher
- Arthur Duff (composer) (1899–1956), Irish composer
- Bob Duff (born 1971), American politician from Connecticut
- Bob Duff (rugby union) (1925–2006), New Zealand rugby union player and coach
- Cara Leland Duff, later Lady Fairhaven (born 1867)
- Celia Duff (born 1953 or 1954), British Hyrox athlete
- Chris Duff, American expedition sea kayaker
- Damien Duff (born 1979), Irish football manager and former player
- Dick Duff (born 1936), Canadian ice hockey player
- Douglas Valder Duff (1901–1978), policeman and author
- Duncan Duff, Scottish actor
- Edward Gordon Duff (1863–1924), British bibliographer and librarian
- Elmyra Duff, fictional character from Tiny Toon Adventures
- Ernest Duff (1931–2016), American businessman, lawyer and Mormon bishop
- Captain George Duff (1764–1805), Royal Navy officer who commanded HMS Mars at the Battle of Trafalgar
- George F. D. Duff, (1926–2001) Canadian mathematician
- Gordon William Duff (born 1947), British professor
- Hailey Duff (born 1997), Scottish curler
- Haylie Duff (born 1985), American actress, Hilary's sister
- Hilary Duff (born 1987), American pop singer and actress, Haylie's sister
- Howard Duff (1913–1990), American actor
- Hugh Duff (politician) (1870/71–1940), Northern Ireland politician
- Jamal Duff (born 1972), American actor and former NFL American football player
- James Duff (disambiguation)
- Jason Duff (born 1972), Australian field hockey player
- Jill Duff (born 1972), Anglican priest and Bishop-designate of Lancaster
- John Duff (disambiguation)
- KJ Duff (born 2005), American football player
- Louis Le Duff (born 1945 or 1946), French billionaire businessman
- Lyman Poore Duff (1865–1955), Canadian Chief Justice
- Michael Duff (physicist) (born 1949), British physicist and string theorist
- Michael Duff (footballer) (born 1978), Northern Ireland footballer
- Sir Michael Duff, 3rd Baronet (1907–1980), British hereditary peer
- Mickey Duff (1929–2014), British boxing promoter
- Sir Mountstuart Elphinstone Grant Duff (1829–1906), Scottish politician and author
- Norwich Duff (1792–1862), British admiral
- Patrick Duff (born 1966), British singer-songwriter
- Peggy Duff (1910–1981), British activist
- Philip S. Duff (1922–1997), American newspaper editor and politician
- Reggie Duff (1878–1911), Australian cricketer
- Rick Duff (born 1964), Canadian boxer
- Robert Duff (disambiguation)
- Roger Duff (1912–1978), New Zealand ethnologist
- Scott Duff (1950–2020), American politician from Oregon
- Shane Duff (born 1982), Northern Irish footballer
- Stan Duff (1919–1941), English footballer
- Thomas Duff (disambiguation)
- Tom Duff (born 1952), Canadian computer scientist
- Warren B. Duff (1904–1973), film and television writer and producer
- William E. Duff, American writer on counterespionage

In the British Royal Family:

- Princess Alexandra, 2nd Duchess of Fife (1891–1959), née Duff
- Princess Maud, Countess of Southesk (1893–1945), née Duff

Scottish aristocrats:

- William Duff, 1st Earl Fife (c. 1696 – 1763)
- James Duff, 2nd Earl Fife (1729–1809)
- Alexander Duff, 3rd Earl Fife (1731–1811)
- James Duff, 4th Earl Fife (1776–1857)
- James Duff, 5th Earl Fife (1814–1879)
- Alexander Duff, 6th Earl Fife (1849–1912), later Alexander Duff, 1st Duke of Fife

== See also ==
- Clan MacDuff
- Duff (disambiguation)
- McDuff (disambiguation)
- Le Duff, another surname
