= Duff =

Duff may refer to:

== People ==
- Duff (surname)
- Duff (given name)
- Duff (nickname)
- Karen Duffy, an actress, model, and former MTV VJ once known as "Duff"
- Duff Roman, on-air name of Canadian radio personality and executive David Mostoway (born 1938)

== Places ==
- Duff, Indiana, United States, an unincorporated community
- Duff, Nebraska, United States, an unincorporated community
- Duff, Tennessee, United States, an unincorporated community
- Duff, Saskatchewan, Canada, a village
- Duff Hill, a mountain in County Wicklow, Ireland
- Duff River, a river in County Sligo, Ireland
- Duff Islands, in the Solomon Islands, Pacific Ocean
- Mount Duff, Mangareva Island, French Polynesia
- Mount Duff (Yakutat), a Canadian mountain on the border between Alberta and British Columbia
- Duff Peak, Victoria Land, Antarctica
- Duff Point, Greenwich Island, Antarctica

== Arts and entertainment ==
- The DUFF (novel), by Kody Keplinger
  - The DUFF, a 2015 film based on the Keplinger novel
- Duff Beer, a fictional brand of beer on The Simpsons
- Elmyra Duff, a fictional character on Tiny Toon

== Other uses ==
- Duff (dessert), a Bahamian dessert and an English term for pudding
- Duff, another name for plant litter, plant material that has fallen to the ground
- Duff, slang term for buttocks
- Duff baronets, three titles in the Baronetage of the United Kingdom
- HMS Duff, two British Royal Navy frigates
- Duff (1794 ship), a British merchant ship
- Duff House, Banff, Scotland
- Duff Building, Owosso, Michigan, United States, on the National Register of Historic Places
- Down Under Fan Fund, science fiction association
- Daf, also called duff, an Indian frame drum of Persian origin
- "up the duff", British and Australian English slang for being pregnant.
- Duff reaction, a formylation reaction used in organic chemistry

== See also ==
- Duff's (disambiguation)
- DUF (disambiguation)
- 達夫 (disambiguation)
