= 2027 United States state auditor elections =

- November 2, 2027

2 state auditor offices (Note: Seat tallies and popular vote do not include states that do not elect state auditors or territorial state auditors.)
	Majority party	Minority party
Party	Republican	Democratic
Seats up	2	0
- Republican incumbent Republican incumbent retiring No election

The 2027 United States state auditor elections will be held on November 2, 2027, to elect the state auditor of two U.S. states. The previous elections for this group of states took place in 2023.

These elections will take place concurrently with various other federal, state, and local elections.

== Race summary ==
State	State Auditor	Party	First elected	Last race	Status	Candidates
Kentucky	Allison Ball	Republican	2023	60.7% R	Incumbent's intent unknown	TBD
Mississippi	Shad White	Republican	2018 (appointed)	59.2% R	Incumbent retiring to run for governor	▌Nick Bain (Republican); ▌Daniel Sparks (Republican)

== Kentucky ==
State Auditor Allison Ball was elected in 2023 with 60.7% of the vote. She is eligible to run for re-election but has not yet stated if she will do so.

== Mississippi ==
State Auditor Shad White was re-elected in 2023 with 59.2% of the vote. He was eligible to run for re-election but has instead chose to run for governor. Former state representative Nick Bain has announced to run for State Auditor. State Senator Daniel Sparks has announced his intention to run for State Auditor.
