= Tatsuya =

- Gender: Male
- Language: Japanese

Origin
- Origin: Japan
- Meaning: It can have many different meanings depending on the kanji used.

Other names
- Related names: Tatsumi; Tatsuo; Tatsuhiko; Tetsuya

Tatsuya (たつや, タツヤ) is a common masculine Japanese given name.

== Written forms ==
Tatsuya can be written using different kanji characters and can mean:

- 達也, "master/accomplished, to be"
- 達矢, "master/accomplished, arrow"
- 竜也, "dragon, to be"
- 竜哉, "dragon, how"
- 竜弥, "dragon, all the more"
- 辰也, "sign of the dragon, to be"
- 龍也, "dragon, to be"

The name can also be written in hiragana or katakana.

== People with the name ==
- Tatsuya Anzai (安在 達弥; born 1996), Japanese footballer
- Tatsuya Egawa (達也, born 1961), Japanese manga artist
- Tatsuya Endo (遠藤 達哉; born 1980), Japanese manga artist
- Tatsuya Enomoto (達也, born 1979), Japanese footballer
- Tatsuya Fuji (born 1941), Japanese film actor
- Tatsuya Fujiwara (竜也, born 1982), Japanese actor
- Tatsuya Fukuhara (福原 辰弥; born 1989), Japanese boxer
- Tatsuya Fukuzawa (福澤 達哉; born 1986), Japanese volleyball player
- Tatsuya Futakami, Japanese shogi player
- Tatsuya Furuhashi (born 1980), Japanese football player
- Tatsuya Hiruta (達也), Japanese manga artist
- Tatsuya Hori (1935–2026), Japanese politician
- Tatsuya Imai (今井達也, born 1998), Japanese baseball player
- Tatsuya Isaka (達也, born 1985), Japanese actor
- Tatsuya Ishida, a comic artist
- Tatsuya Ishihara (立也, born 1966), Japanese anime director
- Tatsuya Ishii (竜也, born 1959), Japanese singer, songwriter, artist
- Tatsuya Ishikawa (竜也, born 1979), Japanese football player
- Tatsuya Ito (born 1961), Minister of State for Financial Services in Japanese Prime Minister Junichiro Koizumi's Cabinet
- Tatsuya Kato (加藤 達也; born 1980), Japanese composer
- Tatsuya Kato (journalist) (加藤 達也; born 1966), Japanese journalist
- Tatsuya Kawajiri (達也, born 1978), Japanese mixed martial arts fighter
- Tatsuya Kimura (木村 立哉; born 1964), Japanese film producer, critic and music producer
- Tatsuya Kinugasa (born 1974), Japanese Olympic medley swimmer
- Tatsuya Kitani (born 1996), Japanese musician
- Tatsuya Kurama (1952–1995), sumo wrestler
- Tatsuya Masushima (born 1985), Japanese footballer
- Tatsuya Mihashi (三橋 達也; 1923–2004), Japanese actor
- Tatsuya Mizuno (born 1981), Japanese professional mixed martial artist
- Tatsuya Mochizuki (達也, born 1963), Japanese football player
- Tatsuya Mori, Japanese documentary filmmaker
- Tatsuya Nagatomo (達也, born 1953), Japanese actor and voice actor
- Tatsuya Nakadai (達矢, 1932–2025), Japanese actor
- Tatsuya Nakamura (中村 達也; born 1965), Japanese musician
- Tatsuya Nōmi (能見達也; 1969–2017), Japanese actor
- Tatsuya Oe, a Japanese electronic music producer, club DJ
- Tatsuya Sakai (坂井 達弥; born 1990), Japanese footballer
- Tatsuya Sakai (marksman), Japanese sport shooter
- Tatsuya Sakuma (達也, born 1974), Japanese professional drifting driver
- Tatsuya Sanmaidō, Japanese shogi player
- Tatsuya Shimizu (清水 達也; born 1999), Japanese baseball player
- Tatsuya Shiokawa (born 1983), Japanese baseball player
- Tatsuya Shinhama (born 1996), Japanese speed skater
- Tatsuya Sugai, Japanese shogi player
- Tatsuya Suzuki (disambiguation), multiple people
- Tatsuya Tanaka (disambiguation), multiple people
- Tatsuya Tanimoto (龍哉, born 1966), Japanese politician
- Tatsuya Tsuboi (壷井 達也; born 2002), Japanese figure skater
- Tatsuya Tsuruta (born 1982), Japanese footballer
- Tatsuya Uchida (内田 達也; born 1992), Japanese footballer
- Tatsuya Ueda (竜也), a Japanese idol, singer-songwriter and radio host
- Tatsuya Uemura (建也, born 1960), Japanese arcade game musician and programmer
- Tatsuya Watanabe (渡邊 達哉; born 1991), Japanese badminton player
- Tatsuya Yamaguchi (disambiguation), multiple people
- Tatsuya Yamashita (born 1987), Japanese footballer
- Tatsuya Yazawa (born 1984), Japanese footballer
- Tatsuya Yoshida (達也), Japanese musician and composer

== Fictional characters ==
- Tatsuya Uesugi (上杉 達也), the main character in Touch
- Tatsuya Shima (島 達也), a character in Wangan Midnight
- Tatsuya Suou (周防 達哉), a main character in Persona 2
- Tatsuya Himuro (氷室 辰也), a character in Kuroko's Basketball
- Tatsuya Shiba (司波 達也), a main character in The Irregular at Magic High School
- Tatsuya Kaname (鹿目タツヤ), younger brother of the title character in Puella Magi Madoka Magica
- Tatsuya Kimura (木村 達也), a character from Hajime no Ippo
- Tatsuya Asami (浅見 竜也), the protagonist of the 2000 tokusatsu series Mirai Sentai Timeranger
- Tatsuya Ukyo, the protagonist of Kurohyou and Kurohyou 2, a spin-off of Yakuza series
