= DUF =

Duf or DUF may refer to:

- Duf, Mavrovo i Rostuše, North Macedonia
- Duf Falls, North Macedonia
- Daf or duf, an Iranian frame drum
- Democratic United Front, Political alliance in Bangladesh
- Domain of unknown function, a protein domain
- Drug Use Forecasting, a US Government program

== See also ==
- Duff (disambiguation)
