= 2027 Mississippi State Auditor election =

- November 2, 2027
Party	Republican	Democratic
Incumbent State Auditor
Shad White
Republican

The 2027 Mississippi State Auditor election will take place on November 2, 2027, to elect the state auditor of Mississippi. Incumbent Republican State Auditor Shad White is eligible to run for re-election to a third full term, but instead chose to run for governor instead.

== Republican primary ==
=== Candidates ===
==== Declared ====
- Nick Bain, former state representative
- Daniel Sparks, state senator
- Phil Buffington, finance attorney

==== Declined ====
- Shad White, incumbent state auditor (running for governor)
