= Owosso Downtown Historic District =

- U.S. National Register of Historic Places
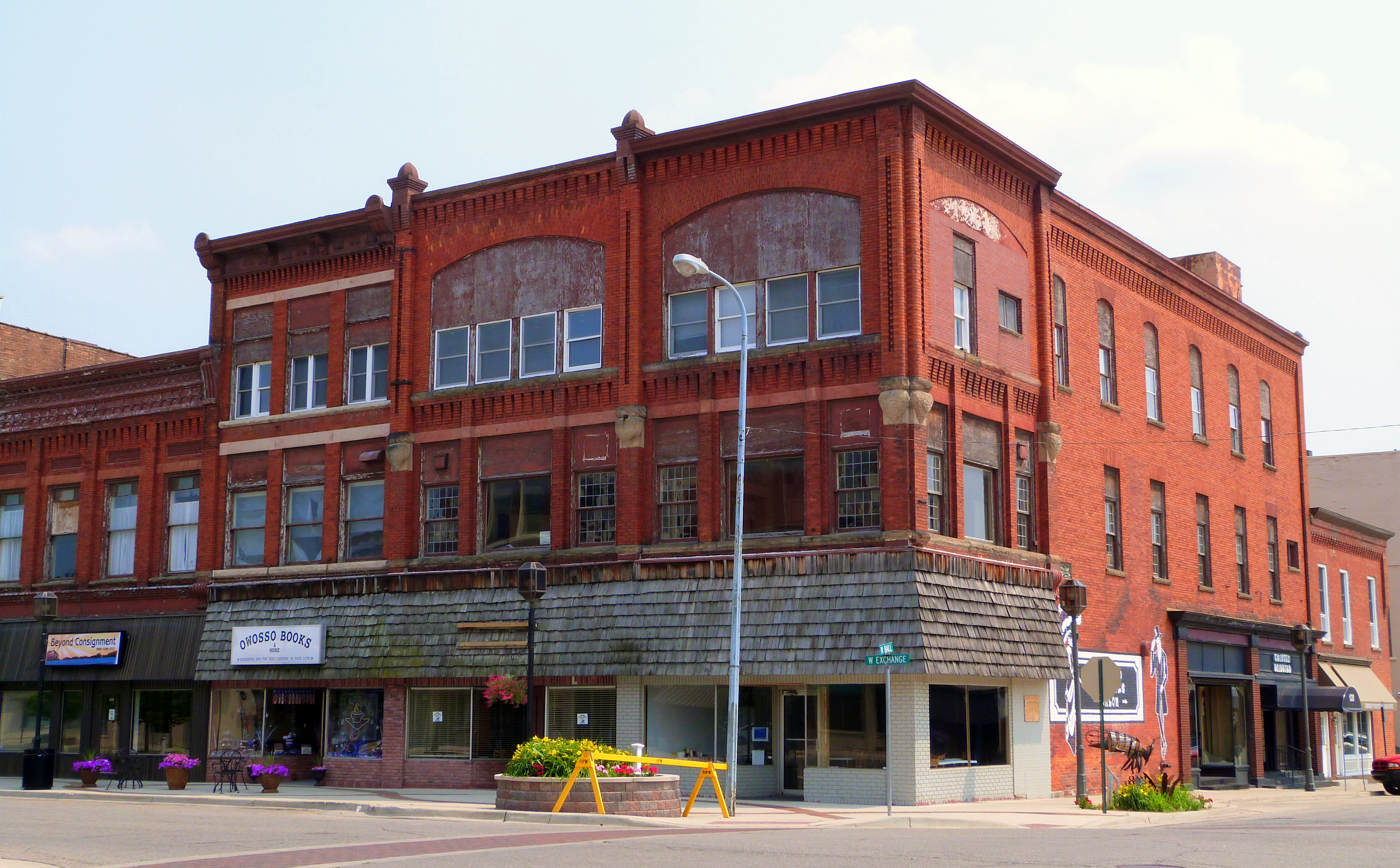
- 119-123 W Exchange St.
- Interactive map
- Location: Roughly bounded by Shiawassee R., Comstock, Water, Park and Mason Sts., Owosso, Michigan
- Coordinates: 42°59′53″N 84°10′14″W
- Architectural style: Greek Revival, Neoclassical, Commercial Brick, Mid-century Modern
- NRHP reference No.: 14000126
- Added to NRHP: April 7, 2014

The Owosso Downtown Historic District is a substantially commercial historic district, located in downtown Owosso, Michigan, roughly bounded by the Shiawassee River, Comstock Street, Water Street, Park Street, and Mason Street. The district was listed on the National Register of Historic Places in 2014.

== History ==
The land in the heart of Owosso was purchased in 1833 by Benjamin O. and Alfred L. Williams. The brothers has a millrace constructed in 1837, along which a series of mills were soon constructed. In 1838, they platted the land in the center of what is now Owosso, encompassing what is now the Owosso Downtown Historic District. The first few commercial buildings were likely already in place, but soon a series of wooden stores were erected, defining Owosso's downtown. The first brick building, constructed in 1844, was the Ament Hotel. The earliest surviving buildings are likely to be the Williams Block at 112 N. Washington, built in 1855, the building at 213 N. Washington, built c. 1856.

The city boomed after the Civil War, and the expansion of the downtown, along with fires that eliminated many older frame buildings, resulted in a substantial rebuilding of Owosso's commercial district. This development continued into the 1880s and 1890s. By 1915, the city center was essentially built out, and further construction was much slower.

== Description ==
The Owosso Downtown Historic District contains primarily commercial buildings, but also contains a number of the city's important historic governmental, school, church, and social buildings. These include the Municipal Building/City Hall, the Owosso Armory, the former High School, two churches, a Masonic Temple, and others. The buildings in the district are typically two and three stories in height, but include two four-story buildings as well as a number of one-story structures. Architectural styles represented include primarily Italianate and Late Victorian commercial styles, but also some vernacular Greek Revival, Neoclassical, Commercial Brick, and Mid-century Modern buildings.

== Gallery ==
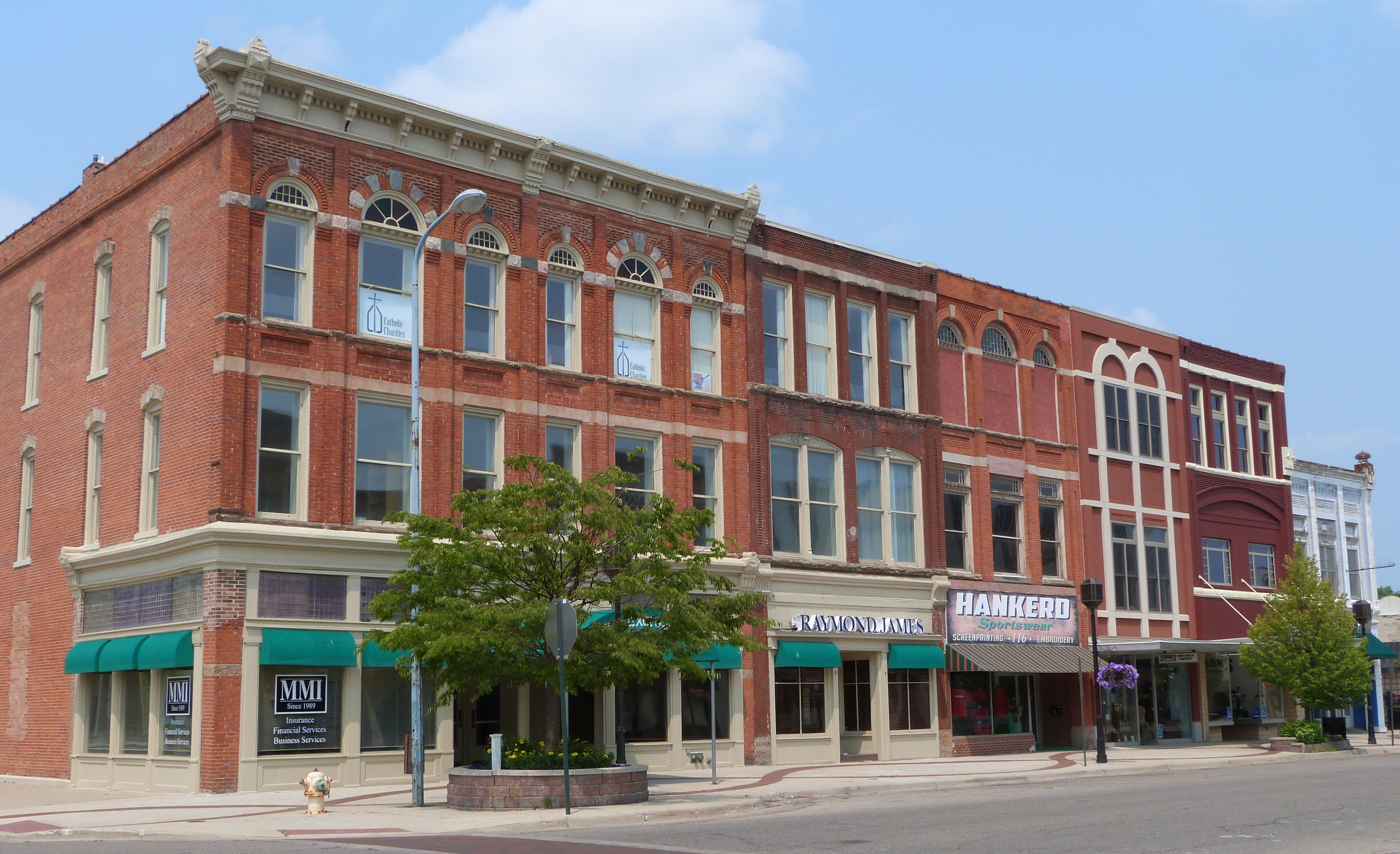
110-122 W Exchange St

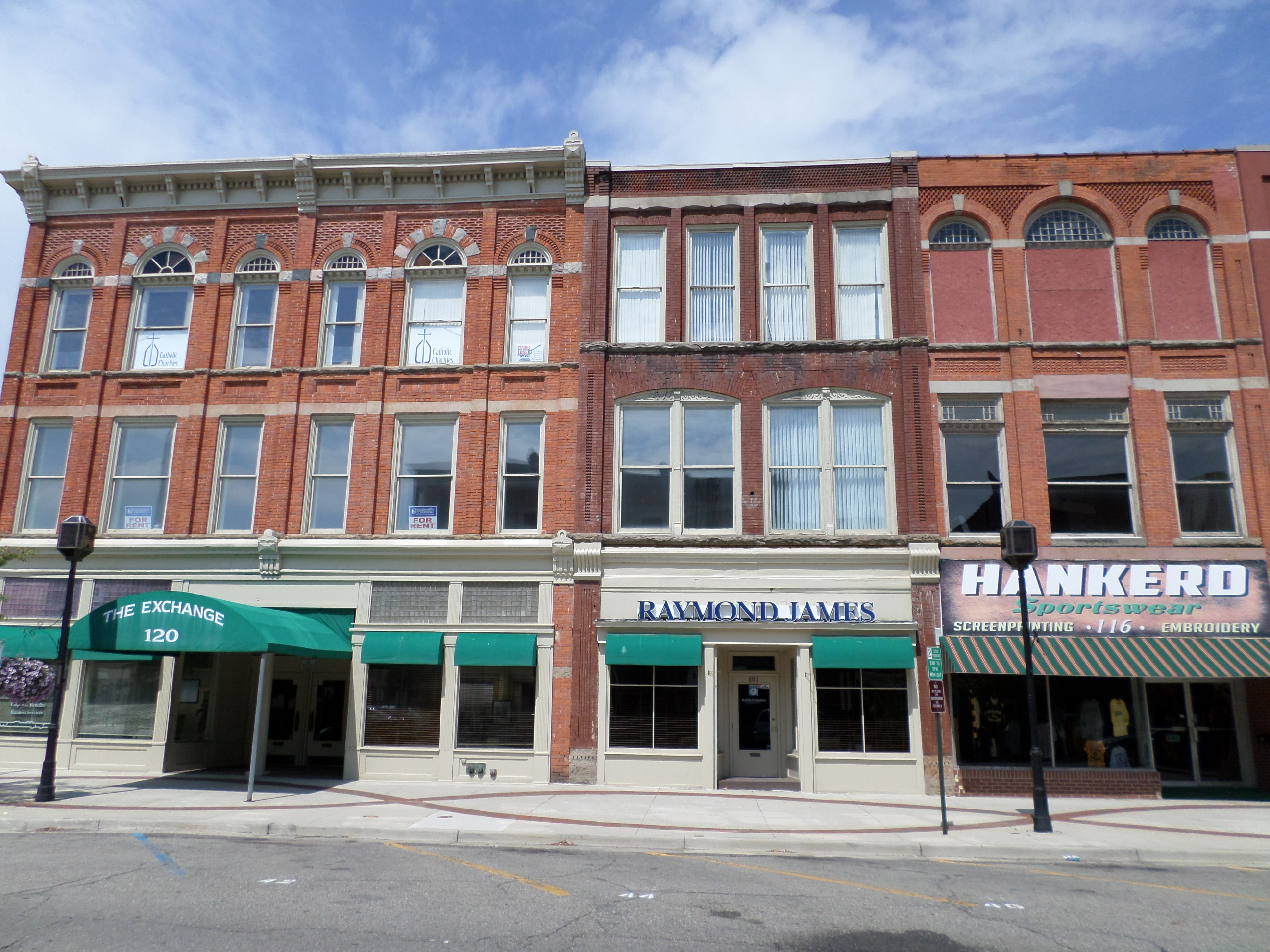
116-120 W Exchange

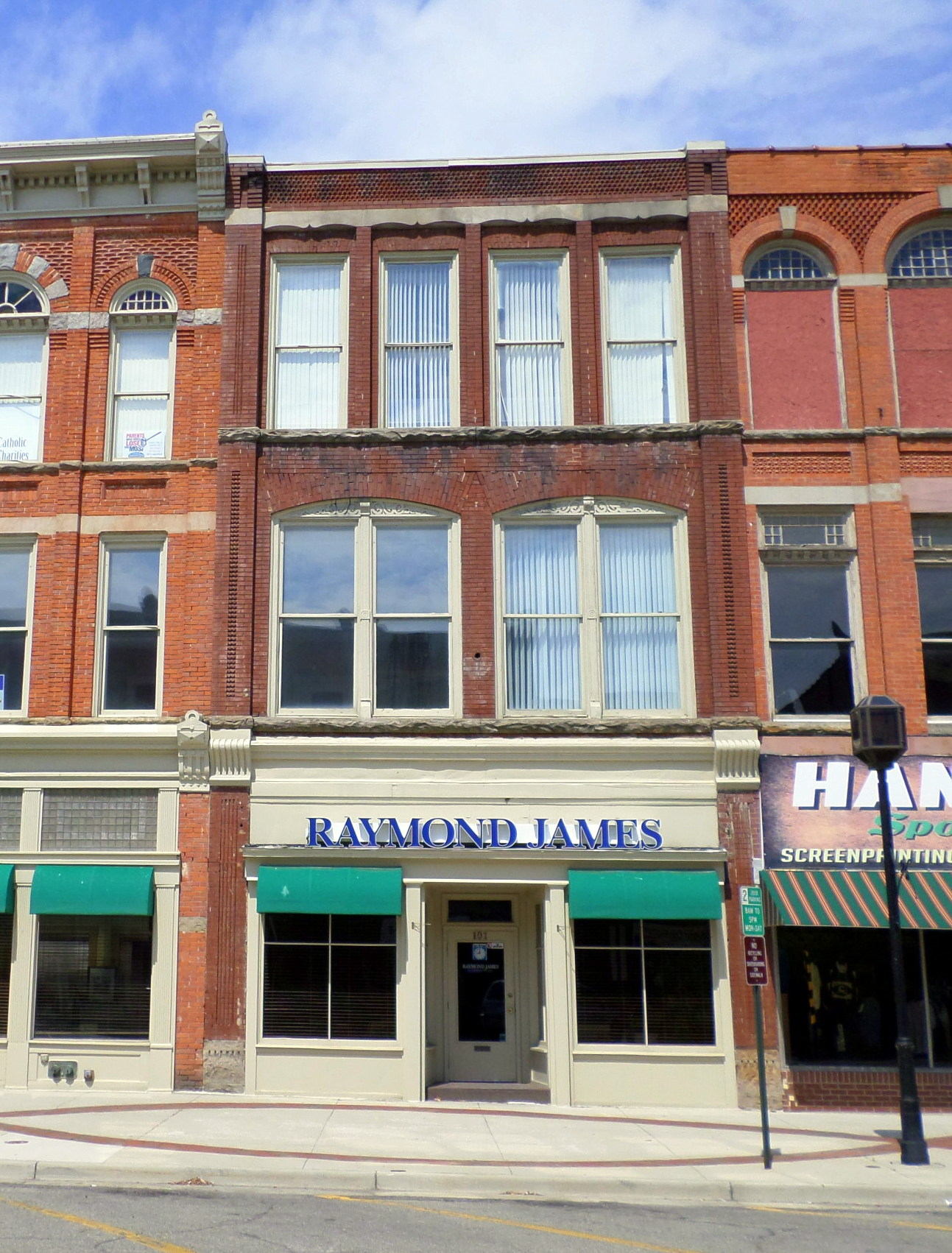
Duff Building

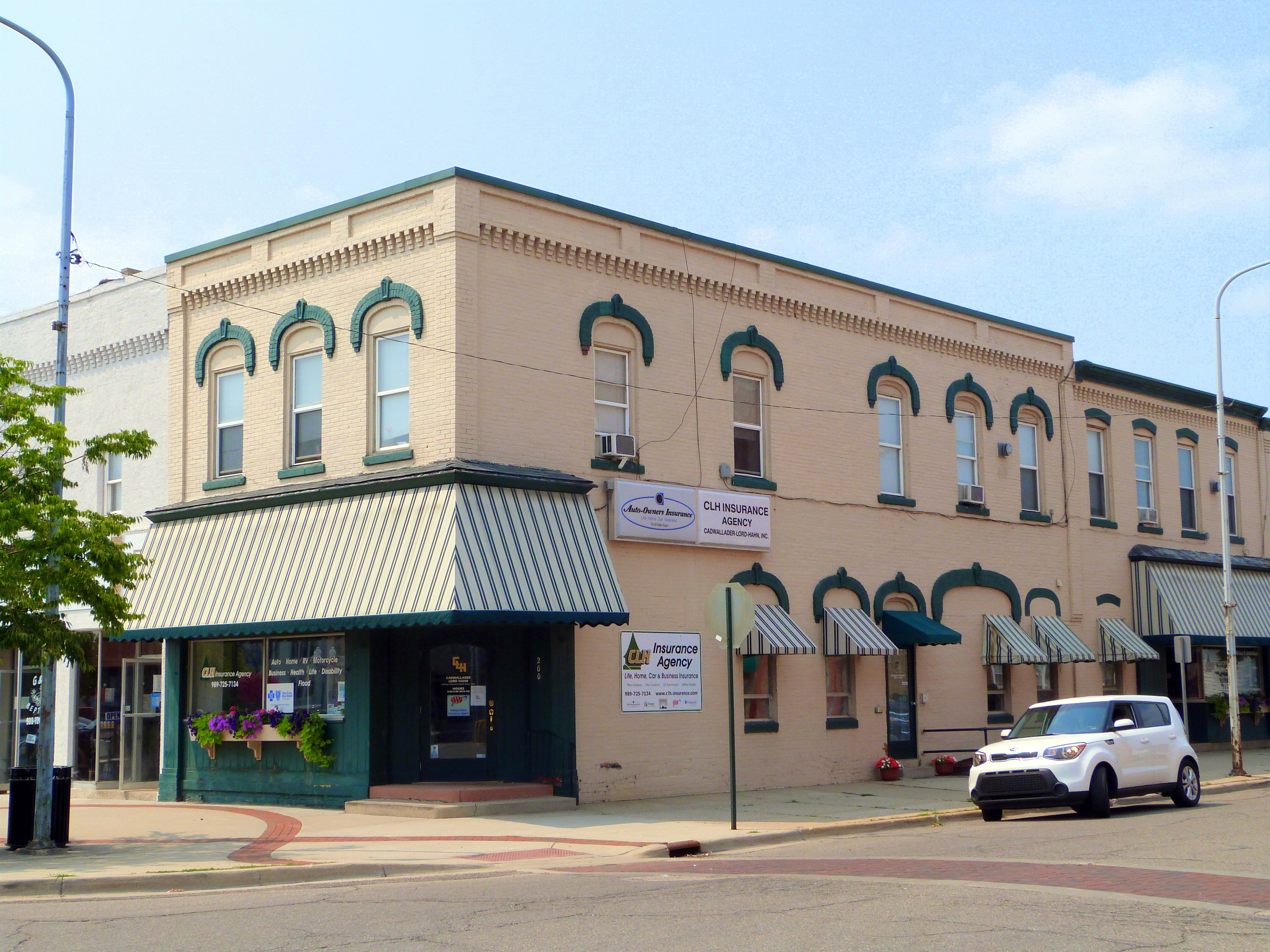
Evening Argus Building

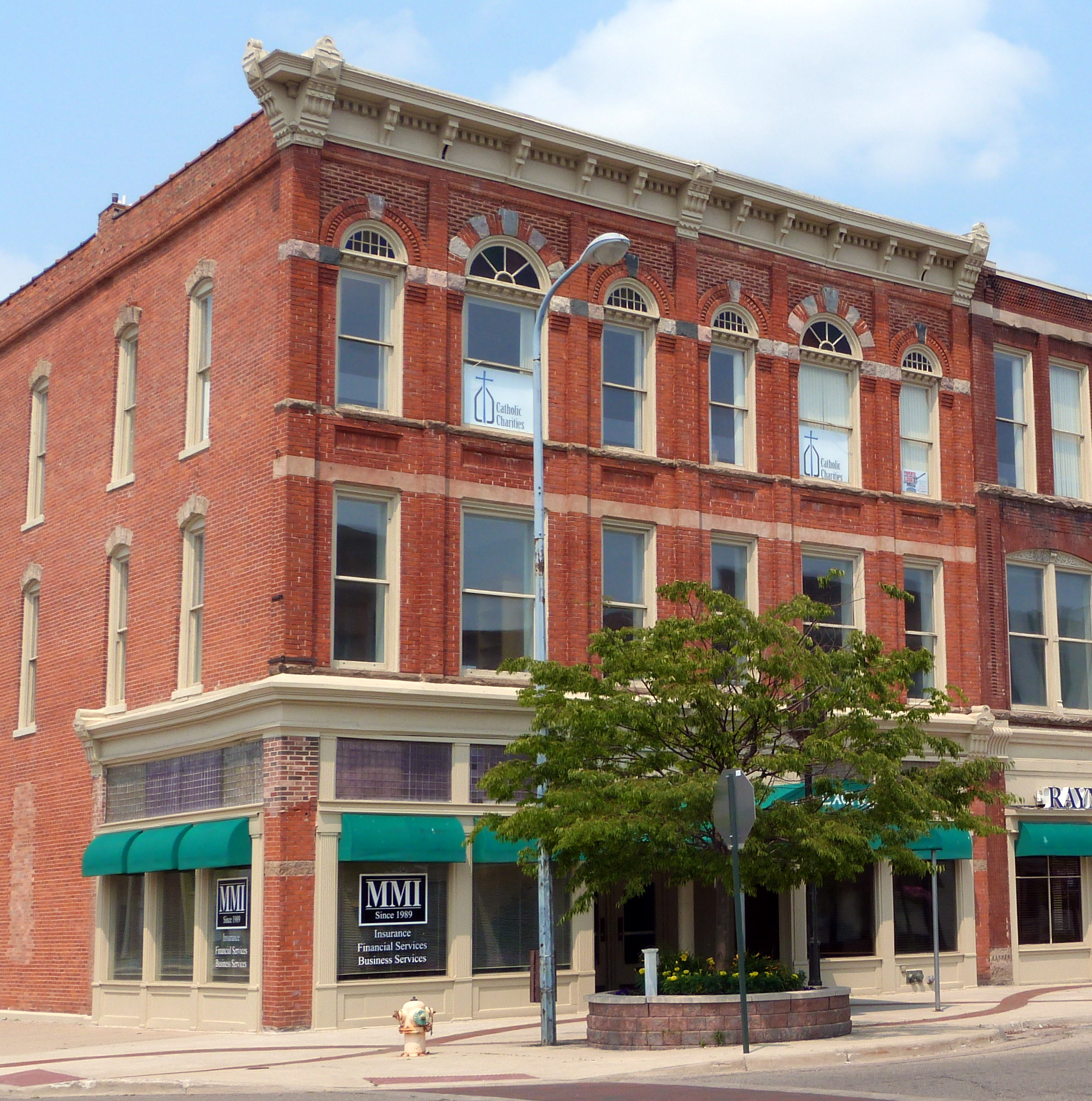
Grow Block
