= Senator Sparks =

Senator Sparks may refer to:

- Dan Sparks (born 1968), Minnesota State Senate
- Daniel Sparks (politician) (born 1974), Mississippi State Senate
- John Sparks (Oklahoma politician) (fl. 1990s–2010s), Oklahoma State Senate
- William A. J. Sparks (1828–1904), Illinois State Senate
