= 達夫 =

達夫, meaning 'reach', 'male', may refer to:

- Chinese transliteration for the surname 'Duff'
- Tatsuo, a masculine Japanese given name
- Yu Dafu (1896–1945), a Chinese writer and poet
