= Daniel Sparks =

Daniel Sparks may refer to:

- Dan Sparks (born 1968), Minnesota politician and member of the Minnesota Senate
- Dan Sparks (basketball) (born 1945), American basketball player and college coach
- Daniel Sparks (politician) (born 1975), American politician in the Mississippi State Senate
