= Tuffin =

Tuffin is a surname. Notable people with the surname include:

- Alan Tuffin (1933–2017), British trade union leader
- Richard Tuffin (born 1944), New Zealand rowing coxswain
- Sally Tuffin (born 1938), English fashion designer and ceramicist

== See also ==
- Duffin
- Ruffin (name)
