= Tetsuo =

Tetsuo may refer to:

- Tetsuo (given name)
- Tetsuo: The Iron Man
- Tetsuo II: Body Hammer
- Tetsuo: The Bullet Man
- Tetsuo, a character in Akira (manga)
