= Robert Duff =

Robert Duff is the name of:

- Robert Duff (Royal Navy officer) (died 1787), admiral and governor for Newfoundland in 1775
- Robert Duff (Newfoundland politician) (1868–1928), Newfoundland businessman and politician
- Sir Robert Duff (British politician) (1835–1895), Scottish Liberal politician, governor for New South Wales between 1893 and 1895

== See also ==
- Duff (surname)
