= James Duff =

James Duff may refer to:

== Politicians ==
- Sir James Duff (British Army officer) (1752–1839), British army officer, who fought in the Napoleonic wars and a Member of Parliament
- James Grant Duff (1789–1858), Indian soldier and statesman
- James Duff (North Norfolk MP) (1831–1878), British MP for North Norfolk
- James Stoddart Duff (1856–1916), Canadian politician
- James Augustine Duff (1872–1943), Ulster Unionist politician in Northern Ireland
- James H. Duff (1883–1969), Pennsylvanian politician
- James Duff, 2nd Earl Fife (1729–1809), MP for Banffshire and Elginshire
- James Duff, 4th Earl Fife (1776–1857), MP for Banffshire
- James Duff, 5th Earl Fife (1814–1879), MP for Banffshire

== Others ==
- Sir James Duff, 1st Baronet (died 1815), of the Duff-Gordon baronets
- James Duff Duff (1860–1940), English translator and classical scholar
- James Fitzjames Duff (1898–1970), British educationalist
- James Duff (businessman) (born 1961), American billionaire businessman
- James Duff (writer) (born 1955), American screenwriter and playwright
- James C. Duff (born 1953), Director of the Administrative Office of the United States Courts

== See also ==
- Jamie Duff (born 1989), Scottish association football player
