= Old Homer Village Historic District =

Historic district in New York, United States

- U.S. National Register of Historic Places
- U.S. Historic district
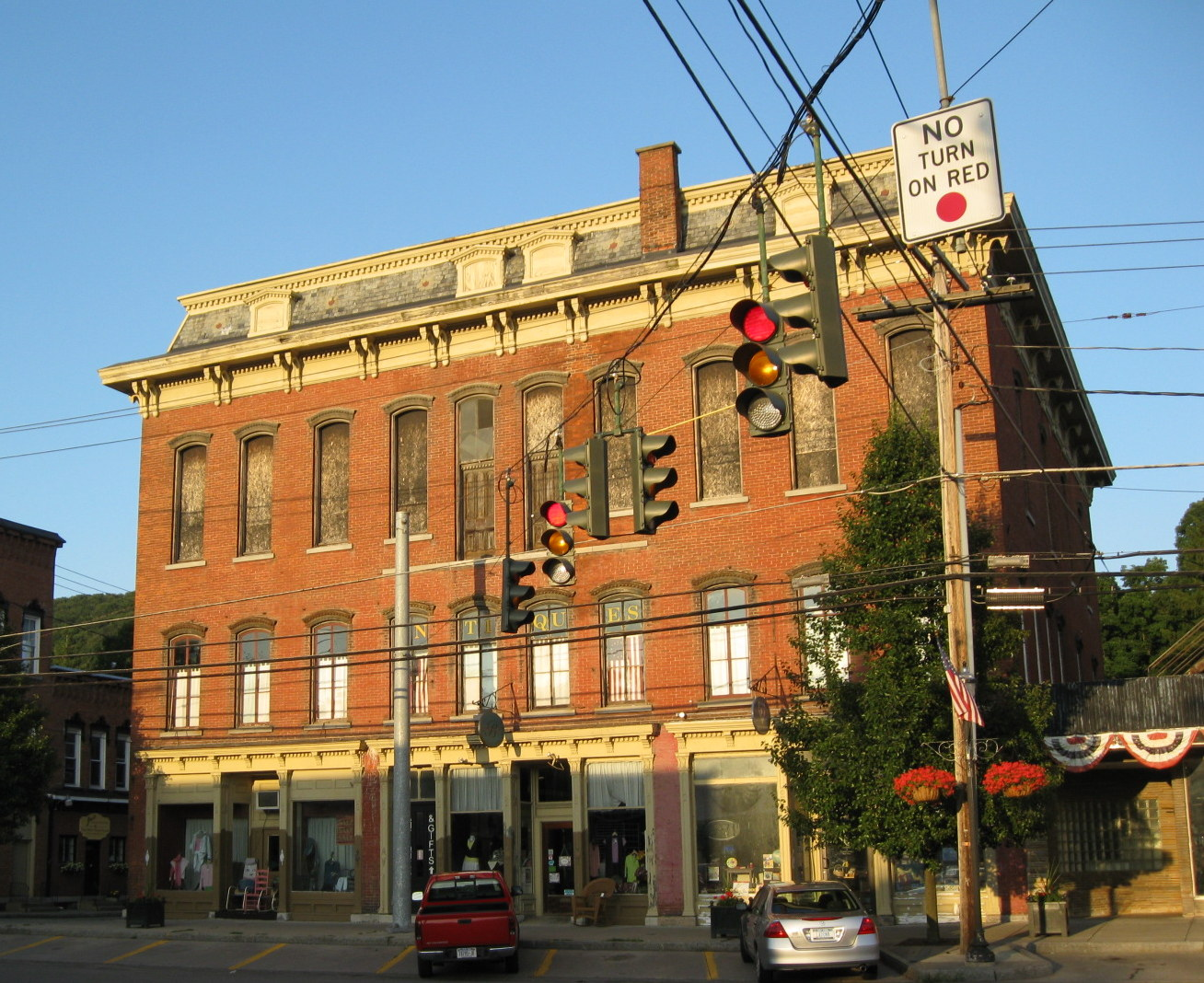
- Jebediah Barber building, August 2009

- Location within New York Location within the United States
- Location: N.and S. Main St., Central Park, Clinton, James, Cayuga, and Albany Sts., Homer, New York
- Coordinates: 42°38′11″N 76°10′50″W
- Area: 6.5 acres (2.6 ha)
- Built: 1800
- Architectural style: Greek Revival, Octagon Mode
- NRHP reference No.: 73001176
- Added to NRHP: October 2, 1973

Old Homer Village Historic District is a national historic district located at Homer in Cortland County, New York. The district includes the historic core of the village of Homer centered on the village green. It includes a mix of residential, commercial, civic, and religious structures. Residences are primarily 2-story frame structures and commercial structures are 2- and 3-story structures constructed of brick. Included within the district is the Homer Town Hall (1908), the 3 1/2-story Jebediah Barber building (1863), 3-story Brockway Block (1887–1888), and residences dating to the 1810s. Also located within the district boundaries is the U.S. Post Office (Homer, New York).

It was listed on the National Register of Historic Places in 1973.

== Gallery ==
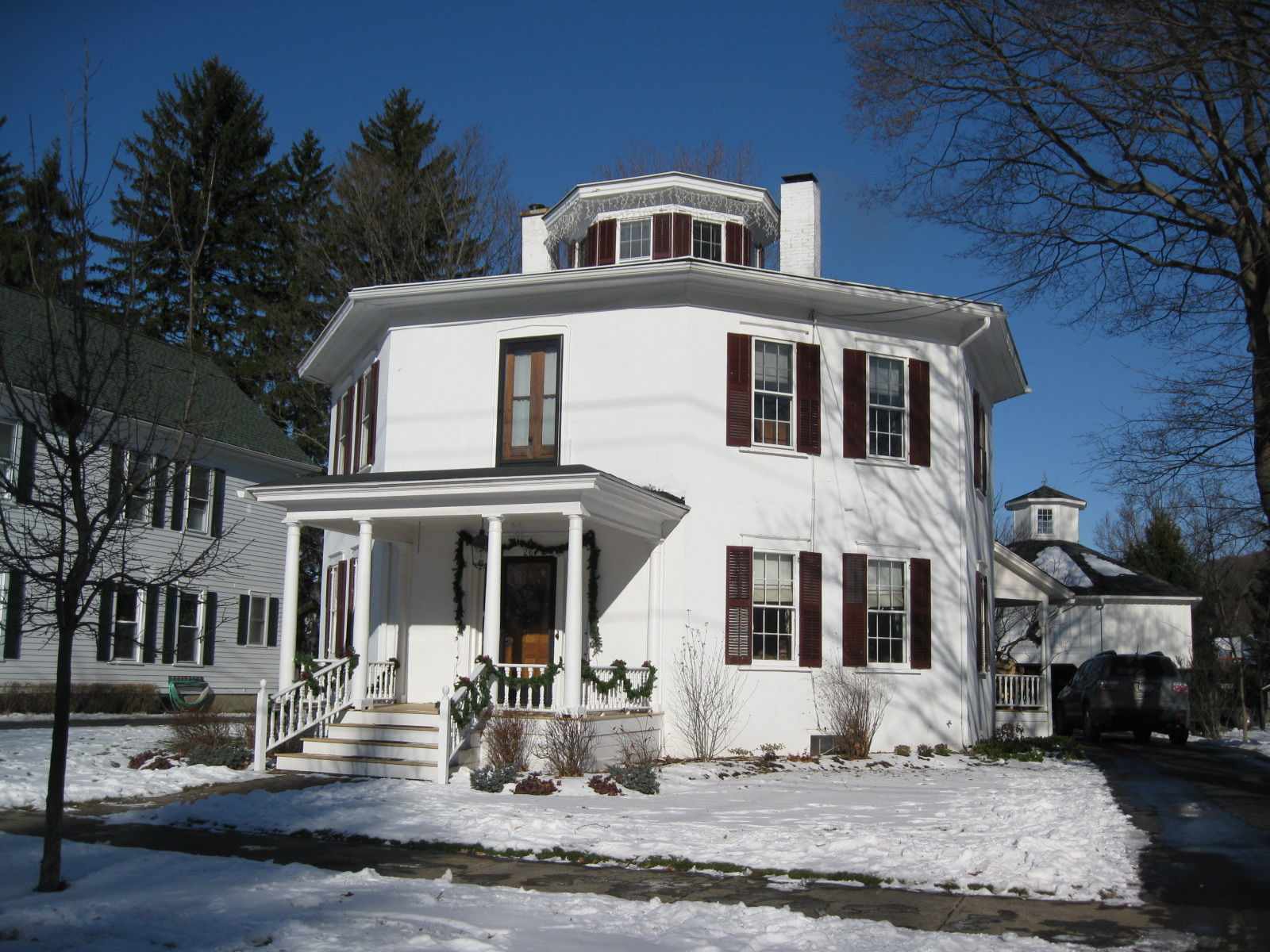
Octagon House, December 2009

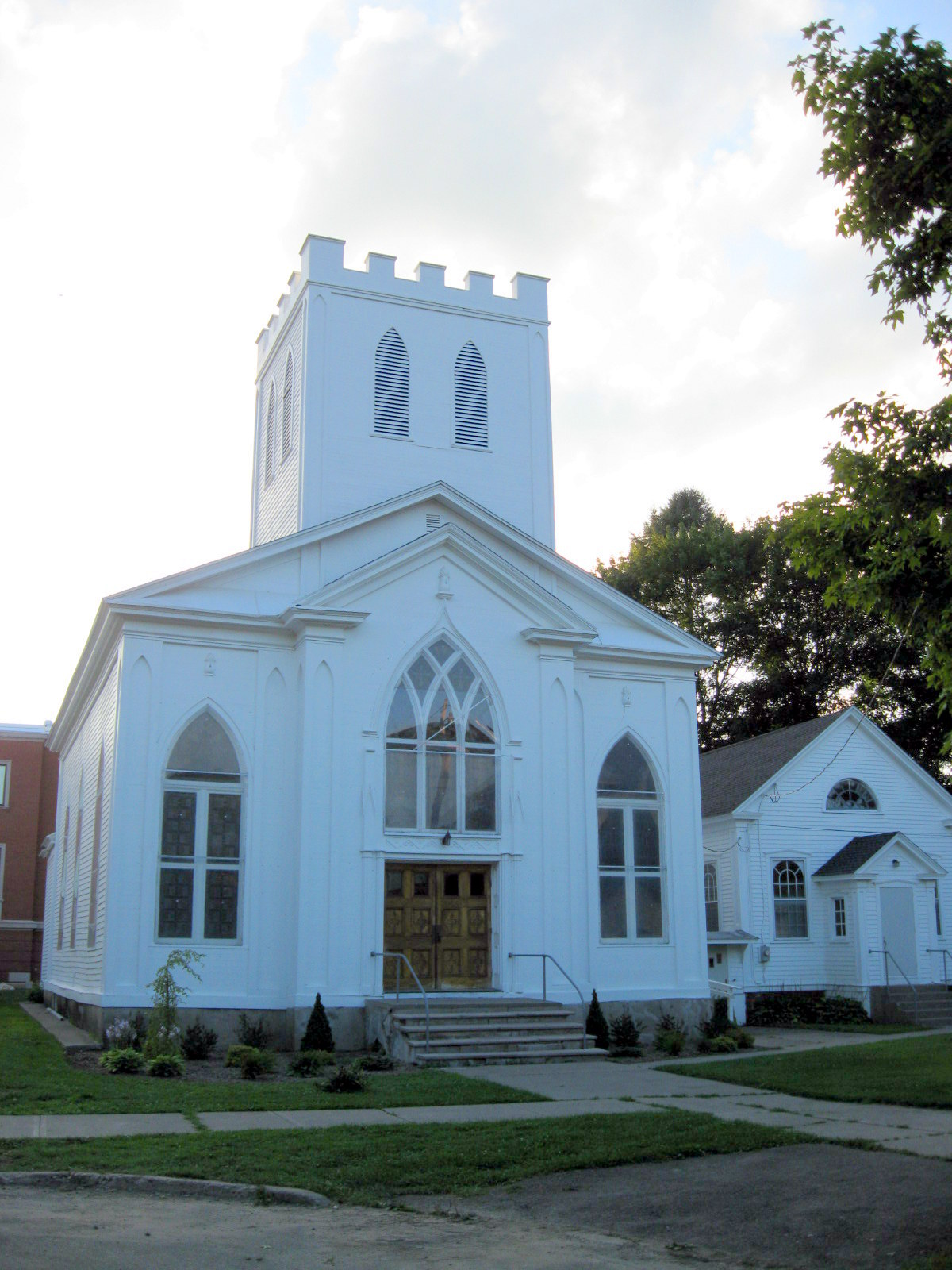
Calvary Episcopal Church, August 2009
