= Duff (given name) =

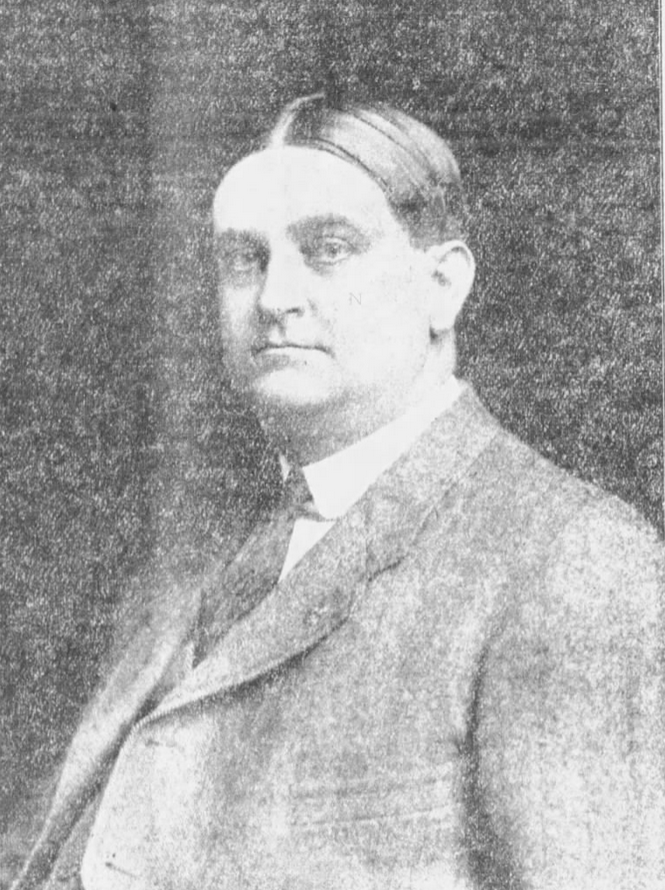
W. Duff Piercy

Duff is a given name, almost always masculine, which may refer to:

== Men ==
- Dub, King of Scotland (died 967), sometimes anglicised as Duff MacMalcolm
- Duff Bruce, Scottish footballer in the 1920s
- Duff Cooley (1873–1937), American baseball player
- Duff Cooper (1890–1954), British politician, diplomat and author
- Duff Gibson (born 1966), Canadian retired skeleton racer and Olympic and world champion
- Duff Green (1791–1875), American teacher, military leader, politician, journalist, author, diplomat, industrialist and businessman
- Duff Hart-Davis (born 1936), British biographer, naturalist and journalist
- Duff Wilson, American investigative reporter

== Women ==
- Duff Twysden (1893–1938), British socialite best known as the inspiration for Brett Ashley in Hemingway's novel The Sun Also Rises

== See also ==
- Duff (nickname)
