= Water, Wall, and Pine Streets Lenticular Truss Bridges =

- U.S. National Register of Historic Places
- U.S. Historic district
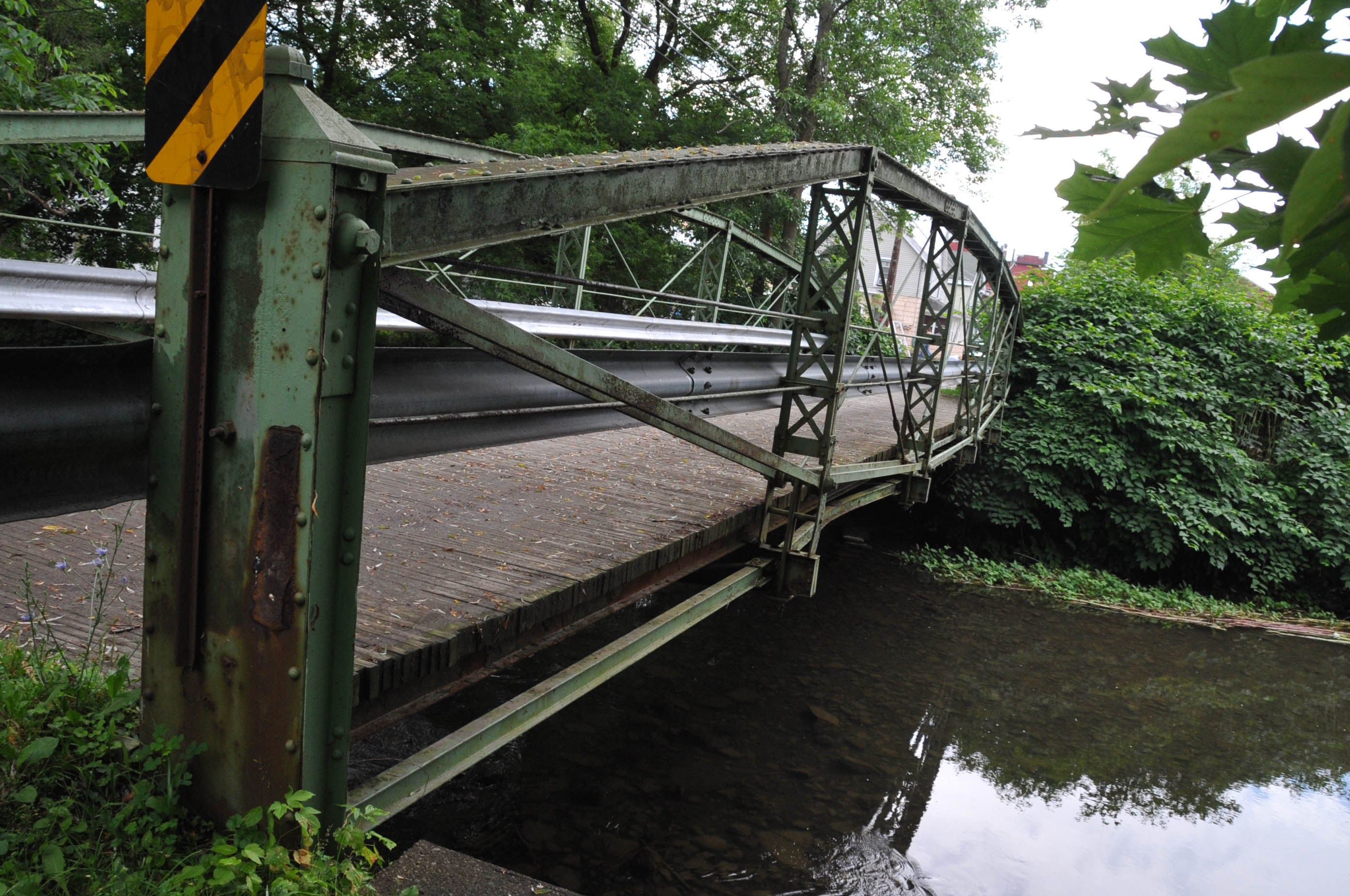

- Location within New York Location within the United States
- Location: Wall, Water and Pine Streets, Homer, New York
- Coordinates: 42°38′15″N 76°10′36″W
- Area: 6.2 acres (2.5 ha)
- Built: 1881
- Architect: Corrugated Metal Co.
- Architectural style: Lenticular truss
- NRHP reference No.: 77000938
- Added to NRHP: October 05, 1977

Water, Wall, and Pine Streets Lenticular Truss Bridges is a national historic district and set of Lenticular truss bridges located at Homer in Cortland County, New York. The district includes a series of three bridges built in 1881 over the Tioughnioga River by the Corrugated Metal Co. of East Berlin, Connecticut.

It was listed on the National Register of Historic Places in 1977.

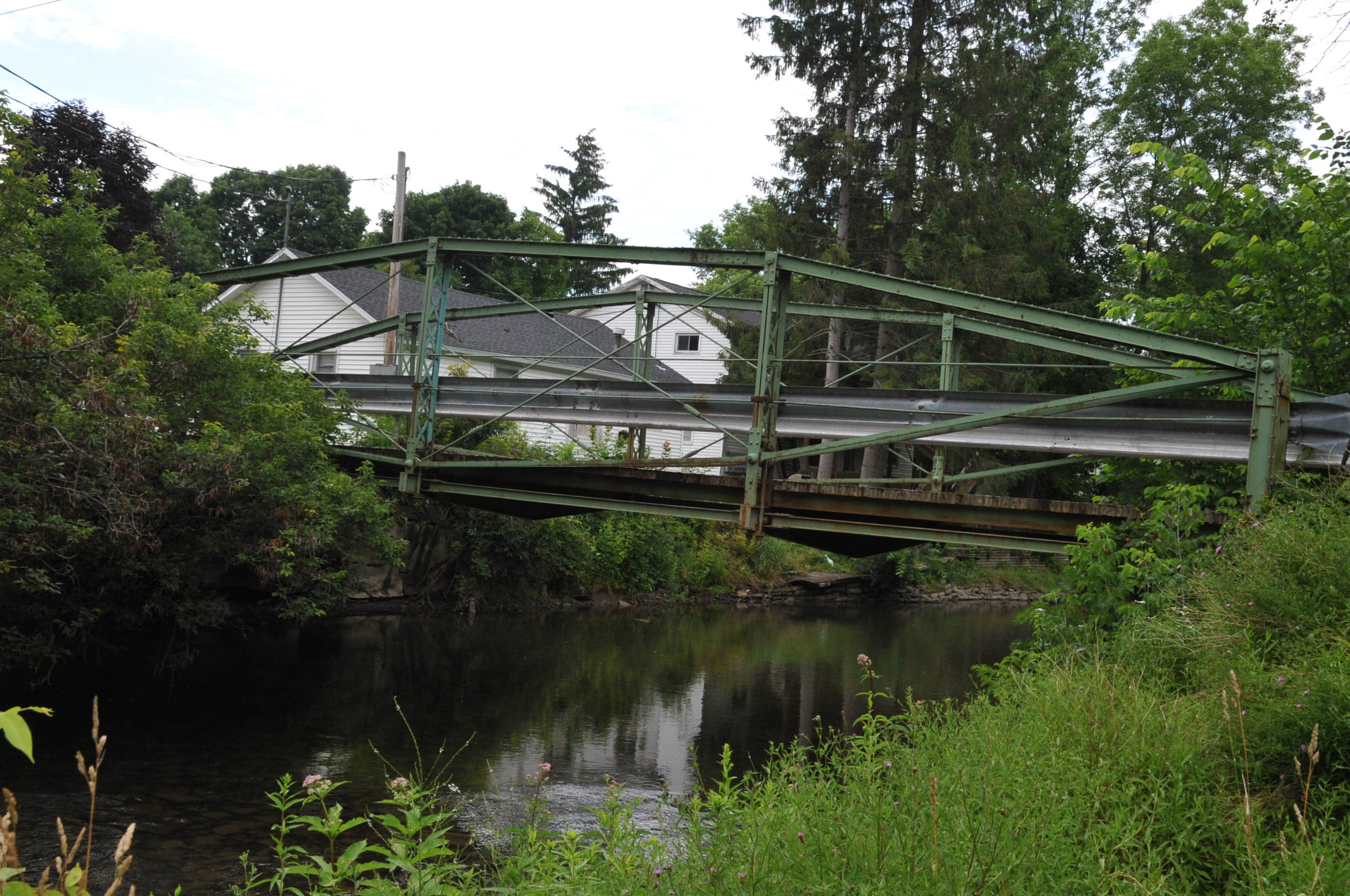
