= Le Duff =

- Pronunciation: pronounced [lə dỹf]

Origin
- Origin: Breton
- Meaning: the stout man or the chubby man
- Region of origin: Brittany

Other names
- Variant forms: Le Dûff, Le Du

Le Duff is a surname, and may refer to:

Like for the surname Henaff, the digraph -ff was introduced by Middle Ages' authors to indicate a nasalized vowel.

- Louis Le Duff, French businessman, founder of Groupe Le Duff
- Dom Duff (Dominique Le Duff ), Breton singer-songwriter
- Charlie LeDuff, American journalist, writer, and media personality
- Christelle Le Duff, French rugby player
- Séverin Le Duff de Mésonan, French politician

== See also ==
- Duff (surname)
