= United States Post Office (Homer, New York) =

- US Post Office-Homer
- U.S. National Register of Historic Places
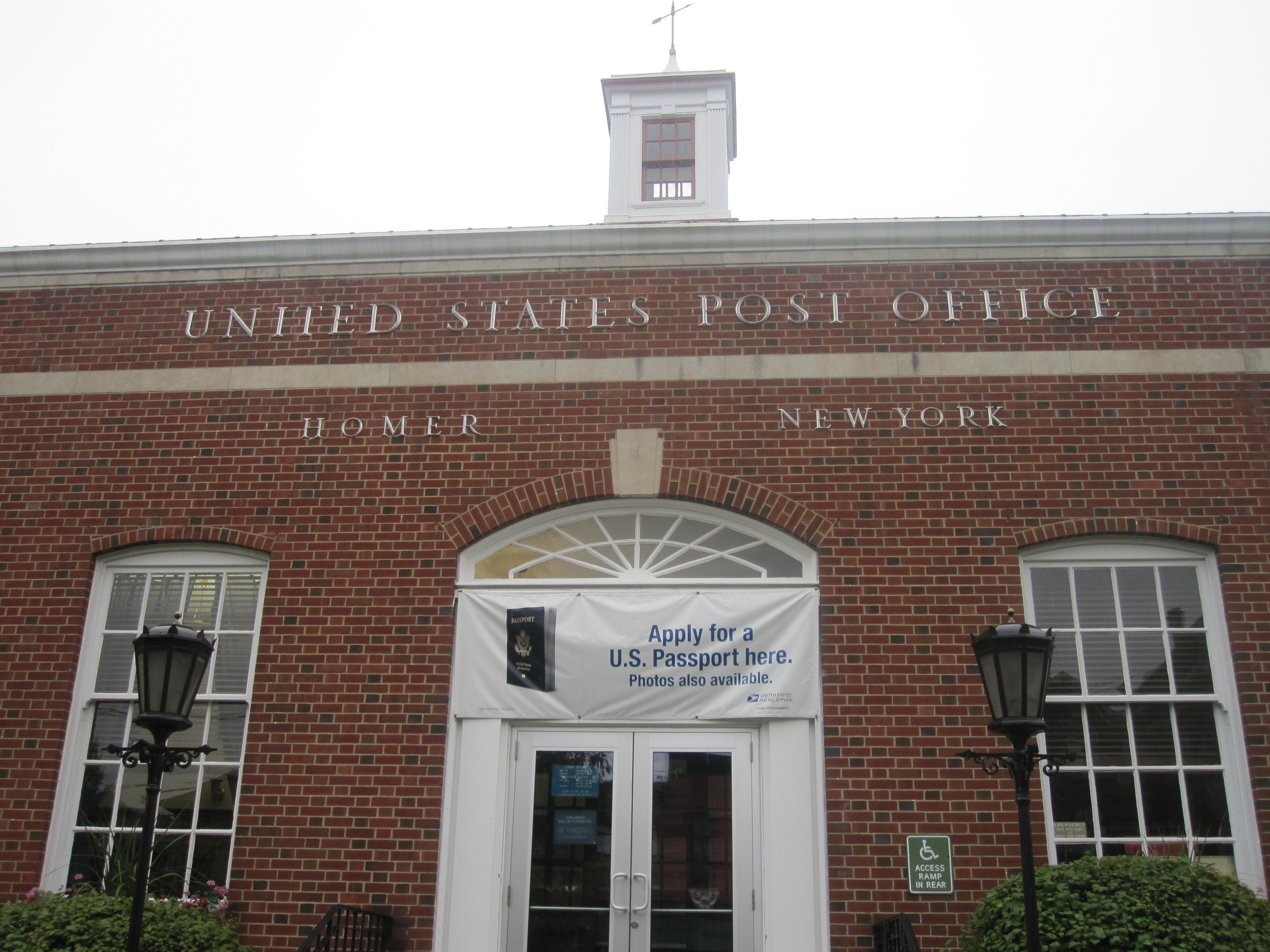
- U.S. Post Office, Homer, New York, July 2009

- Location within New York Location within the United States
- Interactive map showing the location for U.S. Post Office-Homer
- Location: 2 S. Main St., Homer, New York
- Coordinates: 42°38′44″N 76°10′46″W
- Area: less than one acre
- Built: 1937
- Architect: Simon, Louis A.; Romanelli, Frank
- Architectural style: Colonial Revival
- MPS: US Post Offices in New York State, 1858-1943, TR
- NRHP reference No.: 88002502
- Added to NRHP: May 11, 1989

US Post Office-Homer is a historic post office building located at Homer in Cortland County, New York. It was built in 1937-1938 and is one of a number of post offices in New York State designed by the Office of the Supervising Architect of the Treasury Department, Louis A. Simon. It is a one-story, steel frame, five bay rectangular building clad in brick on a stucco clad foundation in the Colonial Revival style. The interior features a mural by Frank Romanelli in 1940 titled "Albany Street Bridge over Tioughnioga River." It is located within the boundaries of the Old Homer Village Historic District.

It was listed on the National Register of Historic Places in 1989.
