= Duff's =

Duff's may refer to:

- Duff's Brooklyn, Williamsburg, Brooklyn, NY, USA
- Duff's device, computer science implementation by Tom Duff
- Duff's Famous Wings, restaurant in Buffalo, New York

== See also ==
- Duff (disambiguation)
- Duffs, golf
