= Brad Mattox =

American politician (born 1970)

Member of the Mississippi House of Representatives from the 2nd district
- Incumbent
- Assumed office January 2, 2024
- Preceded by: Nick Bain

Personal details
- Born: October 28, 1970 (age 55) Booneville, Mississippi
- Party: Republican
- Spouse: Terrina Jennette Mattox
- Education: Northeast Mississippi Community College, Mississippi State University
- Occupation: Business owner, Farmer
- Profession: Politician

Brad Mattox is a Republican member of the Mississippi House of Representatives, representing the 2nd District of Mississippi since 2024. Before his election, Mattox was known as a gun shop owner. He was elected in a closely contested race against incumbent Nick Bain, winning by a narrow margin of 26 votes.
