= Grow Block =

- U.S. National Register of Historic Places
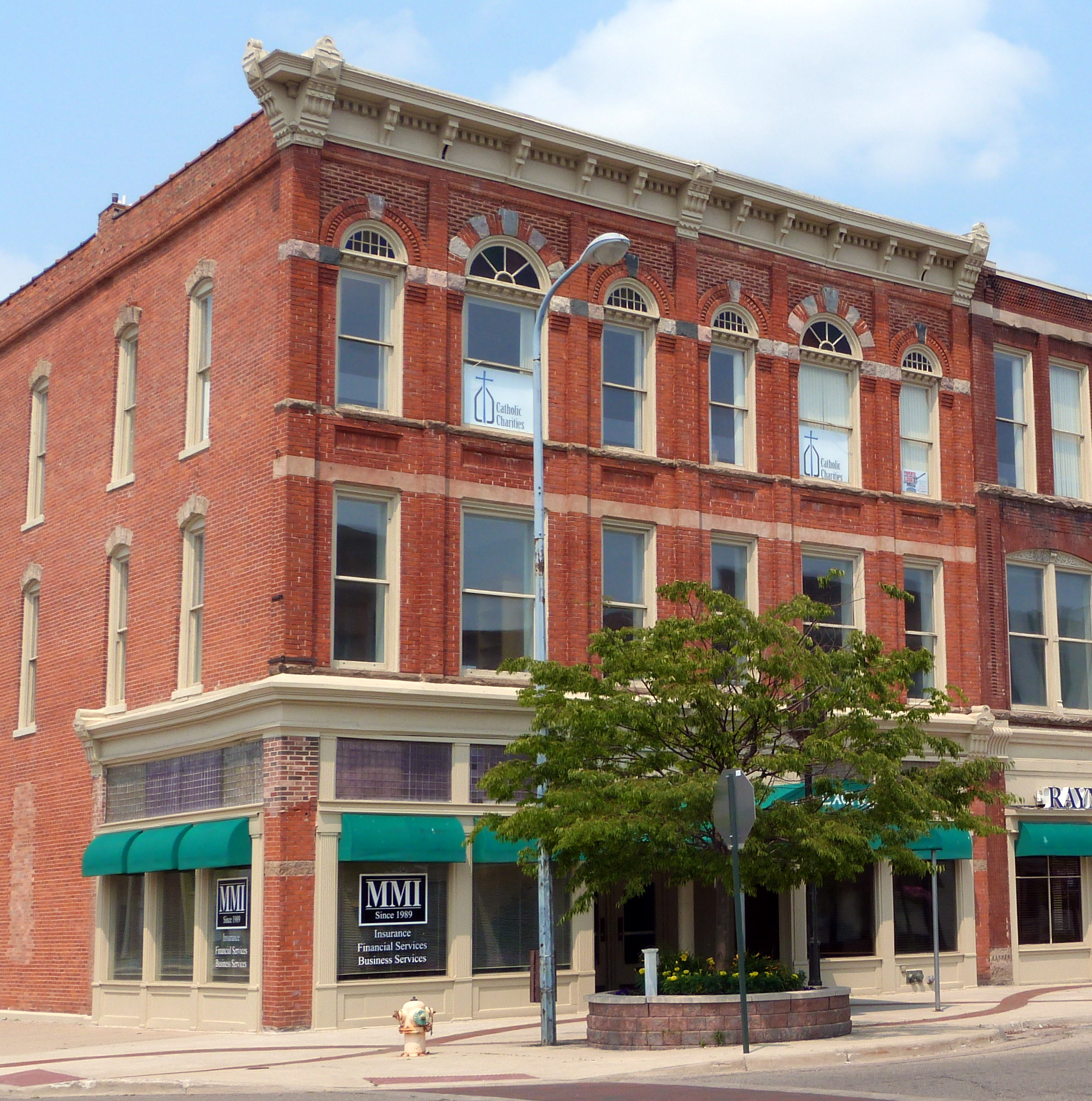
- Interactive map
- Location: 120-122 W. Exchange St., Owosso, Michigan
- Coordinates: 42°59′56″N 84°10′18″W
- Area: less than one acre
- Built: 1890
- Architectural style: Italianate
- MPS: Owosso MRA
- NRHP reference No.: 85000169
- Added to NRHP: January 31, 1985

The Grow Block is a commercial building located at 120-122 West Exchange Street in Owosso, Michigan. It was listed on the National Register of Historic Places in 1985.

== History ==
Manderville D. Grow was born in 1831 in the Village of Homer, New York. His mother died in 1843, and the next year his father moved to Atlas, Michigan. In 1854, Manderville Grow married Eliza Mitchell, and the couple moved to Shiawassee County, where they started a sheep-breeding farm. The farm was successful, but in 1887, the Grows decided to move to Owosso. There, he invested in the community's downtown, buying a plot of land at the northeast corner of Exchange and Ball Streets in 1889.

Grow constructed a building on his land in 1890, and was able to nearly immediately rent out the space in the new building. By 1892, the building housed the barbershop of Alexander Johnson, a former slave and Civil War veteran, in the basement. The first floor housed the post office and Ainslie and Company Confectionery, and the second floor housed the Owosso Business College. The hall on the third floor was used for events by the Ladies Library and the "Foresters," a local men's club. Both the Post Office and the Owosso Business College remained in the Grow Block until the 1920s. Other businesses located in the building were the Globe Music and Novelty Company, the Detroit Free Press, and Hall and Sons (dealers in fancy and staple groceries).

In the 1920s, the ownership of the building passed out of the Grow Family, and the space was consolidated into the home of W.C. Hall and Sons Department Store. In 1932, Montgomery Ward took possession of the building, combining it with the next door Duff Building and an additional structure. The building housed Montgomery Wards until the early 1980s. It then stood vacant for one-and-one-half years until it was donated to the City of Owosso. The city resold it in 1983, and it was renovated.

== Description ==
The Grow Block a three-story, six bay wide commercial building, measuring forty-four feet by eighty-five feet. It is constructed of red brick in an Italianate design. The front facade contains two storefronts, with wide windows above kick panels, recessed entryways, brick side piers, and a secondary cornice of pressed metal running along the top of the first floor. On the second floor, trabeated, one-over-one, double hung sash windows are in each of the six bays, with rounded-arch windows on the third floor aligned with the second floor windows. A pressed metal cornice with end blocks, brackets, and a free-standing name and date plate runs along the top of the building.
