= Thomas Duff =

Thomas Duff may refer to:

- Thomas Duff (architect) (1792–1848), Irish architect
- Thomas Duff (businessman) (born 1956), American businessman
- Thomas Duff (politician) (1870–1949), Australian politician
- Thomas J. Duff, American architect
- Thomas Neil Duff (1896–1978), politician in Ontario, Canada
- Tom Duff (born 1952), Canadian computer programmer
- Tommy Duff (1905–1951), English footballer
