= Duf, Mavrovo i Rostuše =

Duf Дуф
- Village
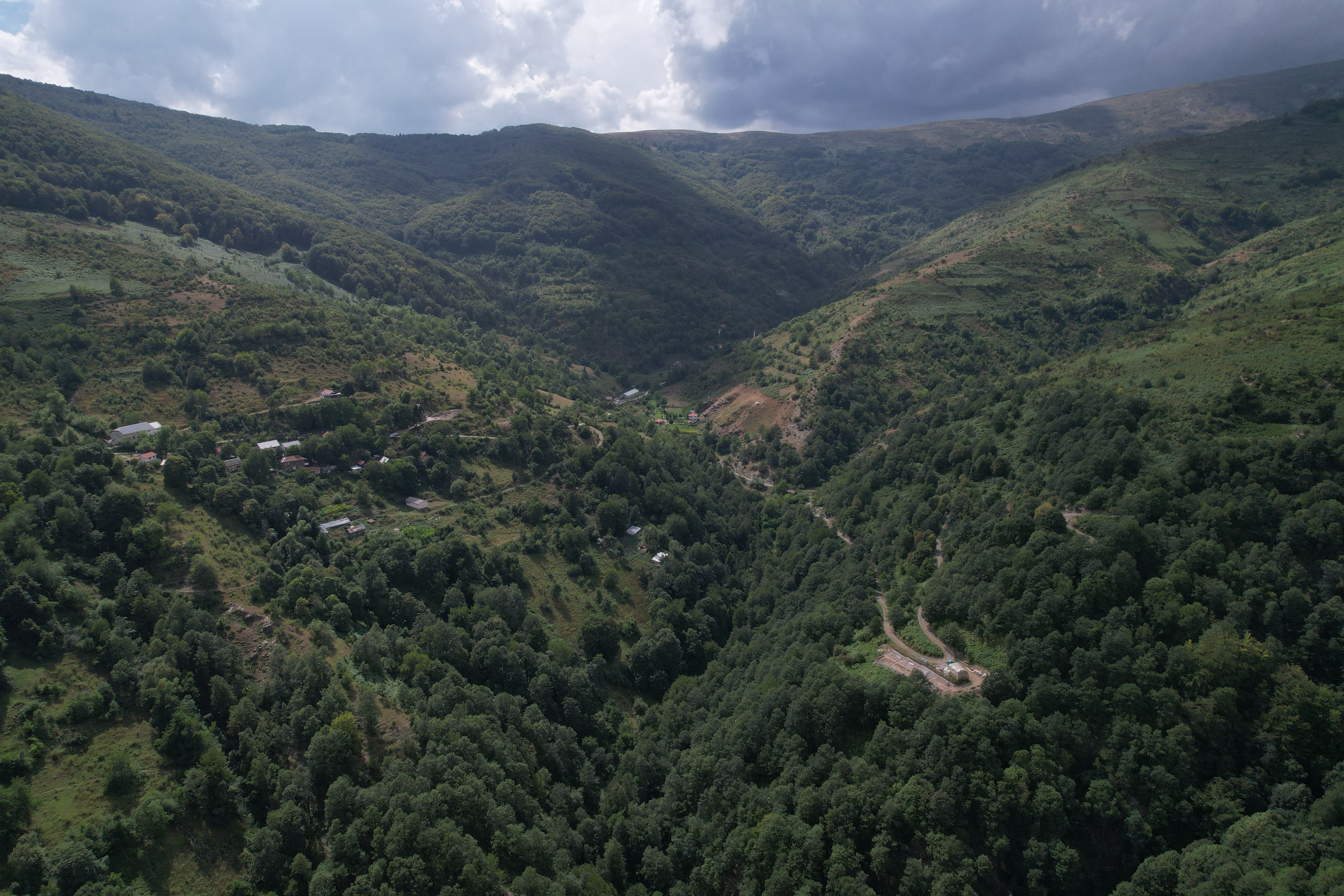
- Airview of the village Duf

- Location within North Macedonia
- Coordinates: 41°45′11″N 20°47′07″E
- Country: North Macedonia
- Region: Polog
- Municipality: Mavrovo and Rostuša

Population (2021)
  - Total: 30
- Time zone: UTC+1 (CET)
  - Summer (DST): UTC+2 (CEST)
- Car plates: GV
- Website: .

Duf (Macedonian: Дуф, Albanian: Duf) is a village in the municipality of Mavrovo and Rostuša, North Macedonia.

== History ==
Although located in the Upper Polog region the village has at times also been considered as belonging to Upper Reka, due to linguistic affiliations and cultural connections. The village has 5 neighbourhoods, Çejlani, Ballaboni, Arqevishi, Brezoveci, and Tojlani.

In statistics gathered by Vasil Kanchov in 1900, the village of Duf was inhabited by 860 Christian Albanians and 270 Muslim Albanians.

In 1916, according to the researcher Stefan Mladenov, in the district of Galičnik it was difficult to accurately count the Albanians, especially in Upper Reka, because there were Christian villages that spoke Albanian and Bulgarian, such as: Beličica, Duf, Sence and Kičinica. According to him, the Muslim Albanians in this area still kept their Christian traditions and lived as brothers with the Christian Albanians of Upper Reka.

The newspaper "Vreme" published on May 20, 1927, the report "Through Southern Serbia : Under Sharr and under Korab". The journalist writing about the region, sees "Serbs who only speak Albanian".

"We are in the district of Galičnik, in the pure Serbian villages: Duf, Gorno Jelovce, Vrben, Kičinica, Beličica, Brodec, where even under Turkey they kept their Serbian names and Orthodoxy, but the residents there do not know a single word of Serbian. They all they speak only Albanian and call themselves Serbs. Their names and surnames are pure Serbian, their dress is like that from our Mavrovo, they celebrate the holidays, but they do not know any language other than Albanian. Now that the schools are open, the children can for the first time learn Serbian and teach in their mother tongue even their parents, who have forgotten it over the centuries"."

However, Salihi notes that this identification is due to the fact that the local Albanians adhered to the Orthodox Christian church. As opposed to reflecting ethno-linguistic identity.

According to the 1942 Albanian census, Duf was inhabited by 710 Serbophone Orthodox Albanians and 164 Muslim Albanians.

== Demographics ==
As of the 2021 census, Duf had 30 residents with the following ethnic composition:

- Albanians 22
- Macedonians 4
- Persons for whom data are taken from administrative sources 4

According to the 2002 census, the village had a total of 39 inhabitants. Ethnic groups in the village include:

- Albanians 37
- Macedonians 2

Prior censuses:

Ethnic group	census 1953		census 1961		census 1971		census 1981		census 1994	
Ethnic group	Number	%	Number	%	Number	%	Number	%	Number	%
Albanians	214	28.8	244	40.1	286	69.2	207	89.6	50	90.1
Macedonians	518	71.2	363	59.9	117	30.8	23	10.4	5	9.9
Total	742		608		413		231		55	
