= HMS Duff =

One ship of the Royal Navy has borne the name HMS Duff, whilst another was planned:

- HMS Duff was to have been a Captain-class frigate. She was however retained by the US Navy as the Evarts-class destroyer escort USS LeHardy.
- HMS Duff (K352) was a Captain-class frigate, previously USS Lamons. She was launched in 1943, returned to the US Navy in 1945 and scrapped in 1946.
