= Tatsuya Suzuki =

Tatsuya Suzuki may refer to:

- Tatsuya Suzuki (footballer, born 1982) (鈴木 達也), Japanese forward
- Tatsuya Suzuki (footballer, born 1993) (鈴木 達也), Japanese defender
