= Homer (village), New York =

Homer, New York
- Village
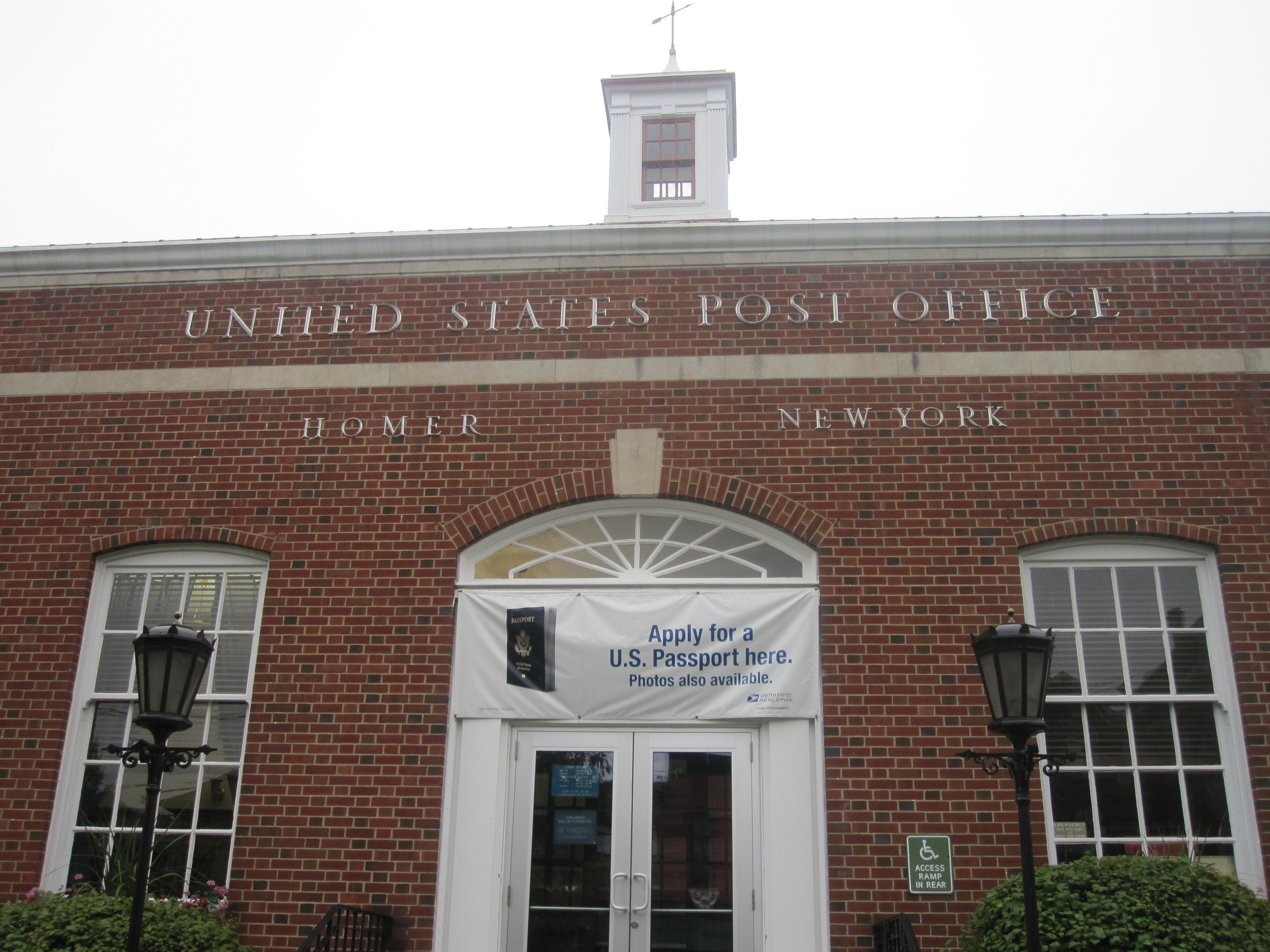
- United States Post Office in Homer, New York

- Location within the state of New York
- Coordinates: 42°38′27″N 76°10′55.22″W
- Country: United States
- State: New York
- County: Cortland
- Towns: Homer, Cortlandville

Area
  - Total: 1.94 sq mi (5.02 km^{2})
  - Land: 1.93 sq mi (4.99 km^{2})
  - Water: 0.012 sq mi (0.03 km^{2})
- Elevation: 1,125 ft (343 m)

Population (2020)
  - Total: 3,210
  - Density: 1,667/sq mi (643.7/km^{2})
- Time zone: UTC-5 (Eastern (EST))
  - Summer (DST): UTC-4 (EDT)
- ZIP Codes: 13077 (Homer); 13045 (Cortland)
- Area code: 607
- FIPS code: 36-35276
- GNIS feature ID: 0953124
- Website: www.villageofhomerny.gov

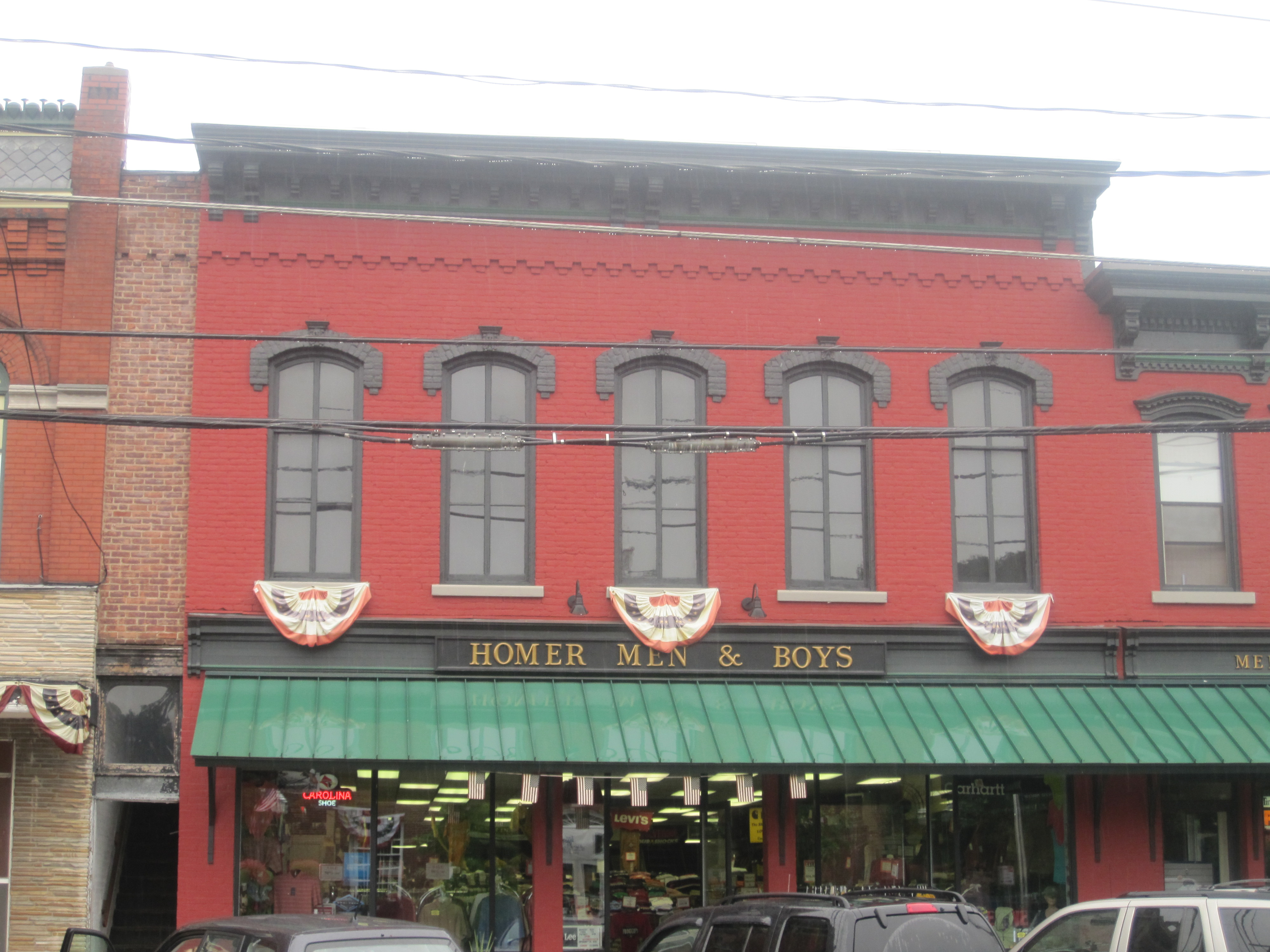
Men and Boys' Clothing Store in the village of Homer

Homer is a village in Cortland County, New York, United States. The population was 3,291 at the 2010 census. The village name is derived from the surrounding town, which was named after the poet Homer.

The village of Homer lies mostly within the town of Homer, except for a small section on the south side which is in the town of Cortlandville. Homer is north of the city of Cortland.

== History ==
Homer is in the former Central New York Military Tract and was within a Military Tract township which was assigned the name "Homer" by a clerk.

Amos Todd, his sister Rhoda Beebe, and her husband Joseph Beebe founded the community in 1791. The village was incorporated in 1835.

The town was the inspiration for "Homeville", the small town in the novel David Harum by Edward Noyes Westcott.

The Old Homer Village Historic District, United States Post Office, and Water, Wall, and Pine Streets Lenticular Truss Bridges are listed on the National Register of Historic Places.

== Geography ==
Homer village is located along the southern border of the town of Homer at 42°38′27″N 76°10′55.22″W (42.640829,-76.182006).

According to the United States Census Bureau, the village has a total area of 1.9 square miles (5.0 km^{2}), of which 0.01 square miles (0.03 km^{2}), or 0.65%, is water.

New York State Route 41 and New York State Route 90 converge on north–south highways New York State Route 281 and U.S. Route 11 at Homer. Interstate 81 is east of the village, with access from Exit 12. Cortland is 2 miles (3 km) to the south, and Tully is 11 miles (18 km) to the north.

The West Branch of the Tioughnioga River, part of the Susquehanna River watershed, flows southward past the east side of the village.

== Demographics ==
Historical population
| Census | Pop. | Note | %± |
|---|---|---|---|
| 1870 | 2,008 | | — |
| 1880 | 2,331 | | 16.1% |
| 1900 | 2,381 | | — |
| 1910 | 2,695 | | 13.2% |
| 1920 | 2,356 | | −12.6% |
| 1930 | 3,195 | | 35.6% |
| 1940 | 2,928 | | −8.4% |
| 1950 | 3,244 | | 10.8% |
| 1960 | 3,622 | | 11.7% |
| 1970 | 4,143 | | 14.4% |
| 1980 | 3,635 | | −12.3% |
| 1990 | 3,476 | | −4.4% |
| 2000 | 3,368 | | −3.1% |
| 2010 | 3,291 | | −2.3% |
| 2020 | 3,210 | | −2.5% |
U.S. Decennial Census

As of the census of 2000, there were 3,368 people, 1,373 households, and 922 families residing in the village. The population density was 2,018.4 inhabitants per square mile (779.3/km^{2}). There were 1,453 housing units at an average density of 870.8 per square mile (336.2/km^{2}). The racial makeup of the village was 97.95% White, 0.56% Black or African American, 0.21% Native American, 0.36% Asian, 0.03% Pacific Islander, 0.24% from other races, and 0.65% from two or more races. Hispanic or Latino of any race were 0.89% of the population.

There were 1,373 households, out of which 31.5% had children under the age of 18 living with them, 51.4% were married couples living together, 13.0% had a female householder with no husband present, and 32.8% were non-families. 26.3% of all households were made up of individuals, and 13.5% had someone living alone who was 65 years of age or older. The average household size was 2.40 and the average family size was 2.88.

In the village, the population was spread out, with 23.8% under the age of 18, 7.3% from 18 to 24, 27.5% from 25 to 44, 23.5% from 45 to 64, and 17.8% who were 65 years of age or older. The median age was 39 years. For every 100 females, there were 85.7 males. For every 100 females age 18 and over, there were 82.6 males.

The median income for a household in the village was $39,310, and the median income for a family was $44,545. Males had a median income of $33,519 versus $22,813 for females. The per capita income for the village was $20,918. About 7.2% of families and 9.7% of the population were below the poverty line, including 16.1% of those under age 18 and 7.3% of those age 65 or over.
