= Tatsuo =

- Gender: Male

Origin
- Origin: Japanese
- Meaning: Different meanings depending on the kanji used

Tatsuo (written: 龍夫, 龍雄, 龍生, 龍男, 龍勇, 竜夫, 竜雄, 竜男, 達夫, 達雄, 達生, 達男, 達郎, 辰夫, 辰雄, 立男, 立郎, 剛男 or 太津朗) is a masculine Japanese given name. Notable people with the name include:

- Tatsuo Endō (actor) (遠藤 太津朗; 1928–2012), Japanese actor
- Tatsuo Endo (engineer) (遠藤 達雄; 1925–1989), Japanese engineer
- Tatsuo Fukuda (福田達夫, born 1967), Japanese politician
- Tatsuo Fujimoto (藤本 達夫; born 1940), Japanese swimmer
- Tatsuo Hasegawa (長谷川 龍雄; 1916–2008), Japanese automotive engineer
- Tatsuo Hirano (平野 達男; born 1954), Japanese politician
- Tatsuo Hori (堀 辰雄; 1904–1953), Japanese writer, poet and translator
- Tatsuo Ichikawa (市川 辰雄; 1916–?), Japanese ice hockey player
- Tatsuo Inagaki (稲垣 立男; born 1962), Japanese artist
- Tatsuo Itoh, American academic
- Tatsuo Jihira (地平 達郎; born 1948), Japanese water polo player
- Tatsuo Kainaka (甲斐中 辰夫; born 1940), Japanese judge
- Tatsuo Kamon (嘉門 達夫; born 1959), Japanese singer-songwriter
- Tatsuo Kawabata (川端 達夫; born 1945), Japanese politician
- Tatsuo Kawai (河相 達夫; 1889–1965), Japanese diplomat and writer
- Tatsuo Kawai (wrestler) (川合 達夫; born 1973), Japanese sport wrestler
- Tatsuo Kinoshita (木下 達生; born 1987), Japanese baseball player
- Tatsuo Kitamura (北村 辰夫; born 1940), Japanese cross-country skier
- Tatsuo Kobayashi (小林 龍生; born 1951), Japanese computer scientist
- Tatsuo Kondō (近藤 龍夫; 1916–1992), Japanese photographer
- Tatsuo Nagai (永井 龍男; 1904–1990), Japanese writer
- Tatsuo Nishida (西田 龍雄; 1928–2012), Japanese linguist
- Tatsuo Sasaki (佐々木 竜雄; born 1942), Japanese sport wrestler
- Tatsuo Sato (director) (佐藤 竜雄; 1964–2026), Japanese anime director
- Tatsuo Sato (politician) (佐藤 剛男; 1937–2013), Japanese politician
- Tatsuo Shimabuku (島袋 龍夫; 1908–1975), Japanese karateka
- Tatsuo Sugimoto (杉本 龍勇; born 1970), Japanese sprinter
- Tatsuo Suzuki (cinematographer) (鈴木 達夫; born 1935), Japanese cinematographer
- Tatsuo Suzuki (martial artist) (鈴木 達夫; 1928–2011), Japanese karateka
- Tatsuo Toki (斎 辰雄; 1904–1967), Japanese decathlete
- Tatsuo Utagawa (宇田川 竜男; born 1917), Japanese ornithologist and academic
- Tatsuo Watanabe (渡部 龍雄; born 1928), Japanese ski jumper
- Tatsuo Yada (矢田 立郎; born 1940), Japanese politician
- Tatsuo Yamada (山田 辰夫; born 1956), Japanese actor
- Tatsuo Yamada (karate) (山田 辰雄; 1905–1967), Japanese karateka
- Yamamoto Tatsuo (山本 達雄; 1856–1947), Japanese politician
- Tatsuo Yanagino (柳野龍男), Japanese animator on Lupin the 3rd Part III
- Tatsuo Yoshida (吉田 竜夫; 1932–1977), Japanese illustrator and character designer

== See also ==
- 2957 Tatsuo, a main-belt asteroid
- Tetsuo (given name)
