= Duf Falls =

Waterfall in North Macedonia

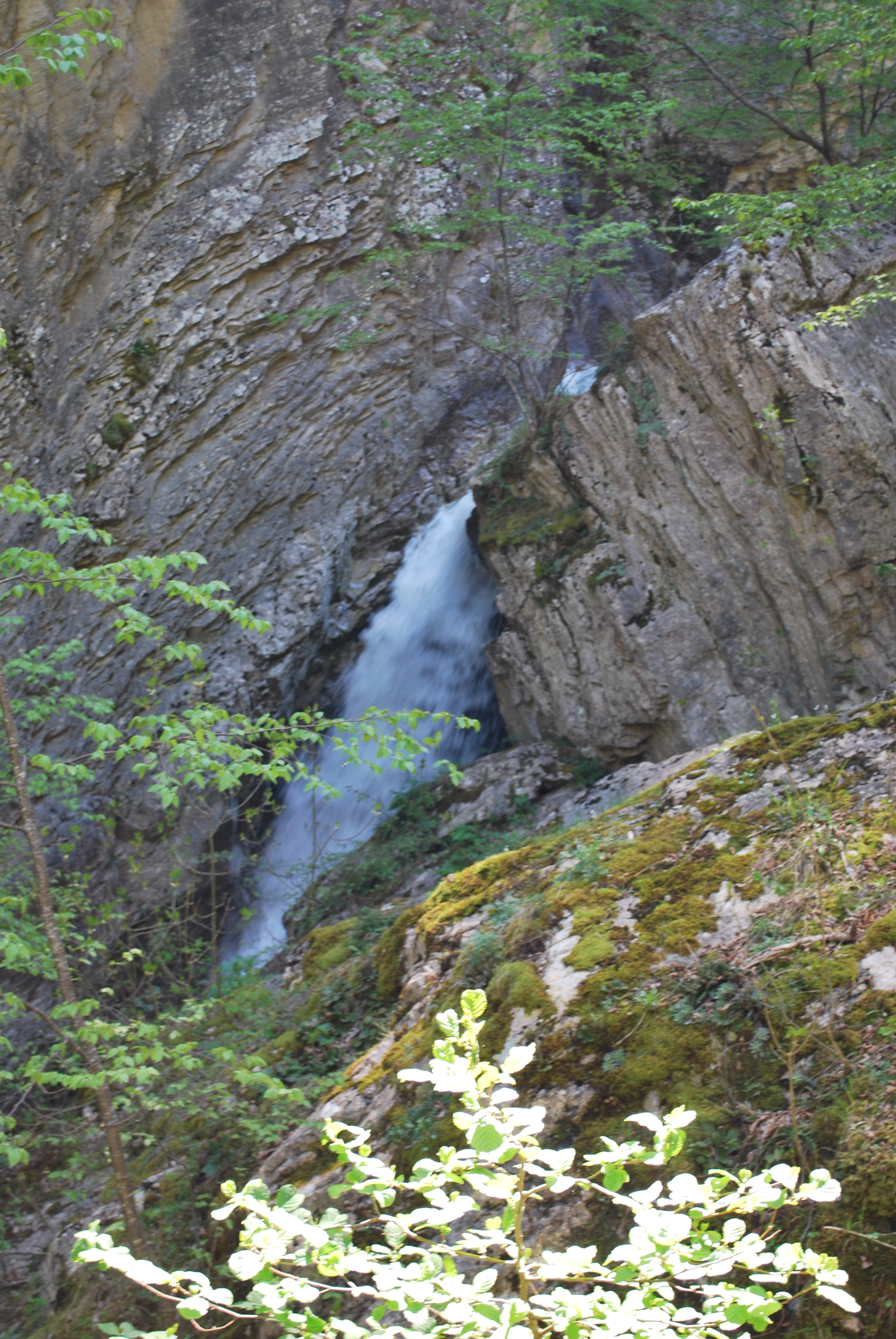
Duf falls

Duf Falls near the village of Rostuša is located in Mavrovo National Park in the western region of North Macedonia. The waterfall is located near the Saint Jovan Bigorski Monastery.

== See also ==
- List of waterfalls
