= Tatsuya Yamaguchi =

Tatsuya Yamaguchi may refer to:

- Tatsuya Yamaguchi (motorcyclist) (born 1976), Japanese motorcycle racer
- Tatsuya Yamaguchi (actor) (born 1972), Japanese film and television actor
- Tatsuya Yamaguchi (footballer) (born 2000), Japanese footballer
