= Tatsuhiko =

- Gender: Male

Origin
- Origin: Japanese
- Meaning: Different meanings depending on the kanji used

Tatsuhiko (written: 竜彦 or 龍彦 or 建彦) is a masculine Japanese given name. Notable people with the name include:

- Tatsuhiko Ichihara (市原 建彦; born 1978), Japanese golfer
- Tatsuhiko Kinjoh (金城 龍彦; born 1976), Japanese baseball player
- Tatsuhiko Kubo (久保 竜彦; born 1976), Japanese footballer
- Tatsuhiko Noguchi (野口 竜彦; born 1997), Japanese footballer
- Tatsuhiko Seta (瀬田 龍彦; born 1952), Japanese footballer
- Tatsuhiko Shibusawa (澁澤 龍彦; 1928–1987), pen name of Shibusawa Tatsuo, Japanese writer, literary critic and translator
- Tatsuhiko Takahashi (髙橋 竜彦; born 1974), Japanese golfer
- Tatsuhiko Takimoto (滝本 竜彦; born 1978), Japanese writer
- Tatsuhiko Kanaoka, Japanese artist known by his pen name Falcoon
