= James Duff (businessman) =

American billionaire businessman

- Born: James Ernest Duff; 1960 or 1961 (age 64–65); Columbia, Mississippi, U.S.
- Education: Utah Valley University (BS)
- Known for: Co-owner, Southern Tire Mart; Co-founder, Duff Capital Investors
- Children: 2
- Relatives: Ernest Duff (father); Thomas Duff (brother)

James Ernest Duff (born 1961) is an American billionaire businessman. Alongside his brother Thomas Duff, he co-owns Southern Tire Mart, the nation's largest truck tire dealer and retread manufacturer, and Duff Capital Investors, the largest privately owned business in Mississippi. With respective net worths of $4.1 billion each, the Duff brothers are the wealthiest individuals in Mississippi.

== Early life ==
Duff was born in 1961 and raised in Columbia, Mississippi. His mother is Bobbie Baggett Duff, and his late father was Ernest Duff, a lawyer and businessman. He has three siblings: Thomas Duff, Stephen Duff, and Jane Duff Thomley.

Duff graduated from Columbia Academy and later attended Utah Valley University, where he studied business.

== Career ==
James's father, Ernest Duff, founded Southern Tire Mart in 1973. James and his brother Thomas both worked there as teenagers and assumed control of the struggling company in 1983. They later sold it in 1998 to Tire Distribution Systems. In 2003, they purchased the company back for $15 million and rebranded it as Southern Tire Mart. At the time of the purchase, sales revenue was $90 million. By 2025, Southern Tire Mart's revenues had grown to exceed $4 billion, making it the nation's largest truck tire dealer and retread manufacturer. It remains the largest of the companies under the Duff Capital Investors (DCI) umbrella.

James and Thomas co-founded Duff Capital Investors, a holding company with revenues of $6 billion. DCI is the largest privately owned business in Mississippi. Since 2009, the brothers have been the only members of the Forbes 400 list from Mississippi. Together, they remain the wealthiest individuals in Mississippi.

== Personal life ==
James is married with two children and resides in Hattiesburg, Mississippi. He is a member of the Church of Jesus Christ of Latter-day Saints.
