= Thomas Duff (businessman) =

American billionaire businessman

- Born: Thomas Milton Duff; December 31, 1956 (age 69); Columbia, Mississippi, U.S.
- Education: University of Southern Mississippi (BBA)
- Title: Co-owner, Southern Tire Mart; Co-founder, Duff Capital Investors
- Political party: Republican
- Children: 2
- Relatives: Ernest Duff (father); James Duff (brother)

Thomas Milton Duff (born December 31, 1956) is an American billionaire businessman and philanthropist. Alongside his brother, James Duff, he co-owns Southern Tire Mart, a truck tire dealer and retread manufacturer, and Duff Capital Investors, a private business in Mississippi.

In addition to his business ventures, Duff has been involved in public service, serving on the Mississippi Institutions of Higher Learning Board of Trustees and supporting Republican political campaigns. He has also made significant philanthropic contributions to Mississippi universities.

== Early life ==
Duff was born on December 31, 1956, and raised in Columbia, Mississippi. His mother is Bobbie Baggett Duff and his father is Ernest Duff, a lawyer and businessman on the side. He has three siblings, James Duff, Stephen Duff, and Jane Duff Thomley.

In 1974, he graduated from Columbia High School. In 1979, Duff graduated with a bachelor's degree in business administration from the University of Southern Mississippi.

== Career ==
Ernest Duff, Thomas's father, founded Southern Tire Mart in 1973. Thomas and his brother James both worked there as teenagers and assumed control of the struggling company in 1983, later selling it in 1998 to Tire Distribution Systems. In 2003, they purchased the company back for $15 million and rebranded it as Southern Tire Mart. At the time of the purchase, sales revenue was $90 million. By 2025, Southern Tire Mart's revenues had grown to exceed $4 billion, making it the nation's largest truck tire dealer and retread manufacturer. It remains the largest of the companies under the Duff Capital Investors (DCI) umbrella.

Thomas Duff and his brother James co-founded Duff Capital Investors, a holding company with revenues of $6 billion. DCI is the largest privately owned business in Mississippi, employing over 6,000 Mississippians and an additional 10,000 employees nationwide. Since 2009, the brothers have been the only members of the Forbes 400 list from Mississippi with the exception of 2024, where they were not present. As of 2025, they are ranked 362th in the U.S. and 980th globally. Together, they remain the wealthiest individuals in Mississippi.

Duff was subject to a lawsuit that accused him of Paycheck Protection Program fraud in 2024. The lawsuit alleged that Southern Tire Mart was claimed to be a small business with fewer employees than was actually the case in order to access federal funds. The plaintiffs voluntarily retracted their lawsuit on May 21, 2026.

=== Politics ===
A major contributor to Republican campaigns in Mississippi, Duff has supported Republican figures such as Governor Tate Reeves, to whose campaigns he has contributed regularly since 2011, as well as Jeb Bush in the 2016 presidential primaries, and Donald Trump in the 2020 and 2024 presidential elections.

Duff formed a political action committee (PAC) in December 2024 to help elect Republicans in 2025 municipal and special legislative elections. He is considering a run for Mississippi governor in 2027. He attended the Neshoba County Fair, the state's preeminent political gathering, in 2024.

In May 2015, Duff was appointed to an 8-year term by Governor Phil Bryant to the board of trustees for the Mississippi Institutions of Higher Learning (IHL). He served as president on the board. His term expired on May 7, 2024. While on the IHL, he delayed but ultimately voted for the relocation of the Confederate monument on the University of Mississippi's campus.

== Philanthropy ==
He and his brother have made contributions totaling around $50 million to the University of Southern Mississippi, the University of Mississippi, and Mississippi State University.

== Personal life ==
He is divorced with two children and lives in Hattiesburg, Mississippi. He is a member of The Church of Jesus Christ of Latter-Day Saints.

Duff was the subject of a murder plot in 2016 to extort money; 3 individuals were arrested.
