= John Duff (disambiguation) =

John Duff (1895–1958) was a Canadian race car driver.

John Duff may also refer to:

- John Duff (counterfeiter) (1759–1799), American counterfeiter, hunter, and scout
- John Duff (singer) (born 1988), American pop singer
- John B. Duff (born 1931), former commissioner of The Chicago Public Library
- John Finlay Duff (1799–1868), captain of ship Africaine and businessman in South Australia
- John Wight Duff (1866–1944), Scottish classicist and academic
