= Ernest Duff =

American businessperson

Ernest Ray Duff
- Born: Ernest Ray Duff; June 2, 1931; Covington County, Mississippi, US
- Died: May 27, 2016 (aged 84); Hattiesburg, Mississippi, US
- Education: Columbia High School; University of Mississippi
- Occupations: Attorney and Businessman
- Known for: Founder, Southern Tire Mart
- Spouse: Bobbie Baggett Duff
- Children: 4, including Thomas Duff and James Duff

Ernest Duff (June 2, 1931 – May 27, 2016) was an American businessman, lawyer and former bishop of The Church of Jesus Christ of Latter Day Saints.

He was the founder of Southern Tire Mart, the largest independent commercial tire dealership in North America.

== Early life ==
Ernest Ray Duff was born June 2, 1931, in Covington County, Mississippi, the youngest of five children of Carl Melton and Lela May Harvey Duff. His father was a building contractor. His parents were members of the Church of Jesus Christ of Latter-day Saints.

Duff was educated at Columbia High School, where he was president of the student body. He graduated with a bachelor's degree from the University of Mississippi, where he was again the student body president. He graduated from the University of Mississippi School of Law.

He served as a city attorney for Columbia for 32 years, and a county attorney for Marion County for 36 years. He was a private attorney for Pearl River Valley Electric Power Association for 53 years.

He served on the board of directors for Trustmark Bank.

== Career ==
An entrepreneur, he founded a truck company to haul wood chips. With the trucks needing tires, he founded Southern Tire Mart in 1973.

In 1973, Duff founded Southern Tire Mart, the largest private tire dealership in North America. The company was later acquired by his sons Thomas Duff and James Duff, which eventually led to the formation of Duff Capital Investors.

== Personal life ==
He was married to Bobbie Baggett Duff, and they had three sons, Thomas, James, and Stephen, and one daughter, Jane Duff Thomley, all of who live in Hattiesburg, Mississippi.

He was a former Bishop and member of the High Priest Quorum of the Church of Jesus Christ of Latter-day Saints.

He died on May 27, 2016, at Forrest General Hospital in Hattiesburg. He is buried at Woodlawn Cemetery in Columbia, Mississippi.
