= Stan Duff =

English footballer

Personal information
- Full name: Stanley Douglas Duff
- Date of birth: Q1 1919
- Place of birth: Liverpool, England
- Date of death: 9 September 1941 (aged 22)
- Place of death: United Kingdom
- Height: 5 ft 8 in (1.73 m)
- Position: Winger

Senior career*
Years	Team	Apps	(Gls)
1934	Earle		
1935–1936	Liverpool	0	(0)
1935–1936	Leicester City	0	(0)
1937–1938	Tranmere Rovers	10	(3)
1938	Waterford		
1938–1939	Chester	2	(0)
1938–1939	New Brighton	6	(0)
Total		18	(3)

International career
	England Amateurs	1	
- * Club domestic league appearances and goals

Stanley Douglas Duff (Q1 1919 – 9 September 1941) was an English professional footballer who played as a winger in the Football League for Tranmere Rovers, Chester, and New Brighton.

== Personal life ==
Duff served as a leading aircraftman in the Royal Air Force Volunteer Reserve during the Second World War. Stationed at No. 5 Observer School, he was killed serving as a wireless operator aboard Bristol Blenheim L8693 when the aircraft crashed in a training accident on 9 September 1941. Duff is buried at the Liverpool Anfield Cemetery.

== Career statistics ==
Appearances and goals by club, season and competition
Club	Season	Division	League		FA Cup		Total	
Club	Season	Division	Apps	Goals	Apps	Goals	Apps	Goals
Tranmere Rovers	1937–38	Third Division North	8	2	1	1	9	3
Chester	1938–39	Third Division North	2	0	0	0	2	0
New Brighton	1938–39	Third Division North	6	0	0	0	6	0
Career total			16	2	2	1	18	3
