= Nick Bain =

American politician (born 1979)

Member of the Mississippi House of Representatives from the 2nd district
- In office 2012 – January 2, 2024
- Preceded by: E. Harvey Moss
- Succeeded by: Brad Mattox

Personal details
- Born: Nick R. Bain; September 18, 1979 (age 47) Corinth, Mississippi, U.S.
- Party: Republican (since 2019); Democratic (until 2019)
- Spouse: Lesley Lewis
- Education: University of Mississippi; Mississippi College School of Law (JD)
- Occupation: Attorney

Nick R, Bain (born September 18, 1979) is a former Republican member of the Mississippi House of Representatives, representing the 2nd district from 2012 to 2024.

== Early life ==
Bain was born in Corinth, Mississippi. He parents are Patricia and Tommy Bain. As a child, he had a speech disorder.

He graduated from Alcorn Central High School. He attended the University of Mississippi, graduating with a business degree and a minor in English. There, he was a member of St. Anthony Hall. He received a J.D. from the Mississippi College School of Law.

== Career ==
Bain was admitted to the Mississippi State Bar in 2006. He opened his law firm specializing in criminal defense, family law, and personal injury law. Bain is also the attorney for the Town of Kossuth in Mississippi. His currently a municipal judge pro tempore for both the City of Corinth and the City of Farmington.

He is also the co-owner of Golden Blessings Adult Daycare.

In 2011, Bain was a successful candidate for district 2 of the Mississippi House of Representatives as a Democrat. His term started in 2012. In 2013, Bain introduced a successful bill to ensure that all Mississippi children would be screened for speech impediments. He was reelected in 2015.

On March 1, 2019, he switched parties and became a Republican. He said he made the switch because "I’m tired of sitting on the sidelines. I’m ready to be part of the policy-making in Mississippi." On November 5, 2019, he was unopposed in the general election and was reelected to the Mississippi House of Representatives as a Republican. His term expired on January 2, 2024.

Bains serves on the Corrections Committee, the Public Health and Human Services Committee, the Tourism Committee, and the Ways and Means Committee. He is also chair of the Judiciary B Committee and vice chair of the Judiciary En Banc Committee. He previously served on the Agriculture Committee, Energy Committee, and the Transportation Committee.

He is president of the Alcorn County Bar Association and a member Mississippi Bar Association. He is also a member of the Mississippi Municipal Association.

== Personal life ==
Bain married Lesley Lewis who is a high school librarian. They have three children: Baylee Anna, Brooks, and Baker. The family lives in Corinth, Mississippi.

He is a Christian Baptist and is a member and deacon of the Oakland Baptist Church. He is also a coach with UPWARD basketball. He serves on the board of The Alliance, the Boys and Girls Club of Corinth, Crossroads Museum, and Keep Corinth Beautiful. He is also a member of the National Rifle Association of America, the Rotary Club, and the Second Amendment Foundation.
