= 2027 Mississippi gubernatorial election =

- November 2, 2027
Party	Republican	Democratic
Incumbent Governor
Tate Reeves
Republican

The 2027 Mississippi gubernatorial election will be held on November 2, 2027, to elect the governor of Mississippi. Republican incumbent Tate Reeves is term-limited and ineligible to seek a third term. Primary elections will be held on August 3, 2027, with a potential runoff on August 31, 2027.

Democrats have not won a gubernatorial election in Mississippi since 1999.

== Republican primary ==
=== Candidates ===
==== Declared ====
- Lynn Fitch, attorney general of Mississippi (2020–present)
- Andy Gipson, agriculture and commerce commissioner of Mississippi (2018–present)
- Philip Gunn, former speaker of the Mississippi House of Representatives (2012–2024)
- Shad White, state auditor of Mississippi (2018–present)

==== Publicly expressed interest ====
- Thomas Duff, businessman (may run as an independent)
- Delbert Hosemann, lieutenant governor of Mississippi (2020–present)

==== Potential ====
- Gregg Harper, former U.S. representative from Mississippi's 3rd congressional district (2009–2019)

==== Declined ====
- Michael Watson, secretary of state of Mississippi (2020–present) (running for lieutenant governor)

=== Endorsements ===
Lynn Fitch

Organizations

- Susan B. Anthony Pro-Life America

=== Polling ===
Hypothetical polling

Duff vs. Fitch vs. Gipson vs. Hosemann vs. White

Poll source	Date(s) administered	Sample size (Note: Key: A – all adults RV – registered voters LV – likely voters V – unclear)	Margin of error	Tommy Duff	Lynn Fitch	Andy Gipson	Delbert Hosemann	Shad White	Undecided
Tarrance Group (R) (Note: Poll commissioned by yes. every kid.)	October 27–30, 2025	600 (RV)	± 4.1%	2%	9%	17%	15%	15%	42%

== Democratic primary ==
=== Candidates ===
==== Declared ====
- Ivana Williams, former Mississippi Highway Patrol trooper and internet personality
- Priscilla Williams-Till, teacher, cousin of Emmett Till and candidate for U.S. Senate in 2026

==== Potential ====
- Jim Hood, former attorney general of Mississippi (2004–2020) and nominee for governor in 2019
- Brandon Presley, former Mississippi public service commissioner (2008–2024) and nominee for governor in 2023

== Independents ==
=== Candidates ===
==== Publicly expressed interest ====
- Thomas Duff, businessman (may run as a Republican)

== General election ==
=== Polling ===
Hypothetical polling

Generic Republican vs. generic Democrat

Poll source	Date(s) administered	Sample size	Margin of error	Generic Republican	Generic Democrat	Undecided
Tarrance Group (R)	October 27–30, 2025	600 (RV)	± 4.1%	60%	39%	1%

== Notes ==
Partisan clients
