= Duff Building =

- U.S. National Register of Historic Places
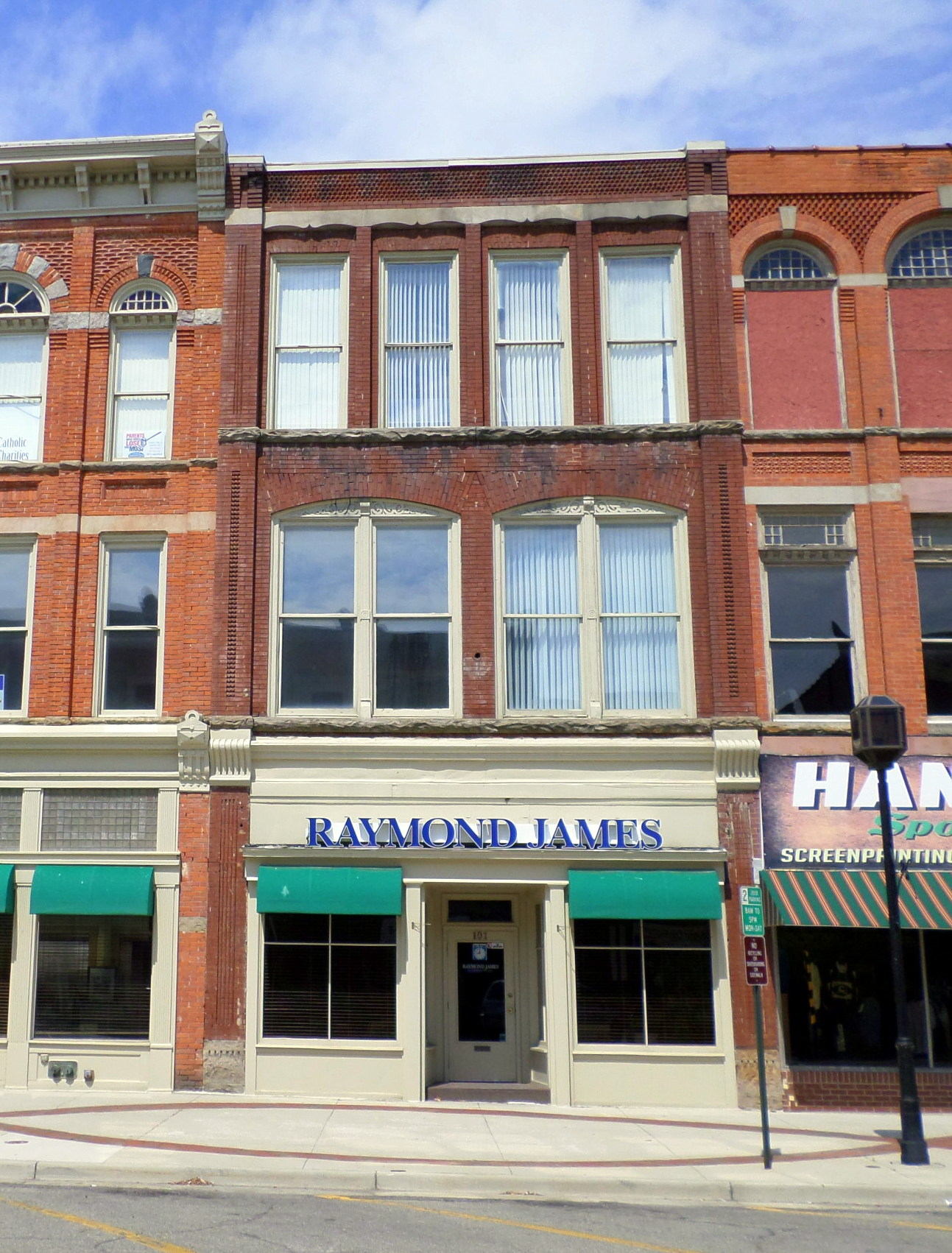
- Interactive map
- Location: 118 W. Exchange St, Owosso, Michigan
- Coordinates: 42.998817°N 84.171601°W
- Area: less than one acre
- Built: 1890
- Architectural style: Italianate
- MPS: Owosso MRA
- NRHP reference No.: 85000168
- Added to NRHP: January 31, 1985

The Duff Building is a commercial structure located at 118 West Exchange Street in Owosso, Michigan. It was listed on the National Register of Historic Places in 1985.

== History ==
The Duff family was established in Owosso by the 1840s, when Charles C. Duff established a grocery in the community. By the Civil War, both Duff's business and the town of Owosso had grown substantially. However, Duff put his business on hold to enlist in the Union army. He returned to Owosso after the end of the war and re-established the grocery. By 1880, downtown Owosso and Duff's grocery were booming.

In 1889, Duff purchased the title to an undeveloped piece of property in Owosso's downtown from Manderville D. Grow. Grow had purchased a strip of land on which he was constructing the Grow Block on the western portion, leaving the eastern portion for sale. Duff began construction of a new building, completing it in 1890. Records indicate that the firm of "Duff and Detwiler" occupied the building during the 1890s, but it is unclear whether Duff's partner W.J. Detwiler was involved at all in the construction of the Duff Building.

By 1912, Duff moved his store to another location, and sold the Exchange Street building to Willis E. Hall and George W. Detwiler. Detwiler took over as sole owner, ond over the next two decades the building housed the Detwiler grocery, the jewelry firm of D.H. Wen and Company, optometrist George B. Gilbert, the Knapp and Smith Undertaking firm, the Owosso Meat Market, and Telfers Market. In 1932, the Duff Building was leased to Montgomery Ward, who purchased it in 1939.

To contain the Montgomery Wards store, the Duff building was combined with the Grow Block and a third building to create more space. Montgomery Wards remained in the building until the early 1980s. It was rehabilitated in 1983.

== Description ==
The Duff Building is a three-story, four-bay building measuring twenty-two feet by eighty-five feet. It is constructed of red brick. The facade is designed in an Italianate style, with one storefront containing a recessed doorway, wide windows with kick panels below, and brick side piers. The second floor contains two paired, one-over-one, double hung sash windows set in bowed-arch brick openings. The third floor level, contains four symmetrically placed one-over-one, double hung sash windows.
