= Tetsuo (given name) =

- Gender: Male

Origin
- Origin: Japanese
- Meaning: Different meanings depending on the kanji used

Tetsuo (written: 哲夫, 哲男, 哲雄 or 鉄夫) is a masculine Japanese given name. Notable people with the name include:

- Tetsuo Hara (原 哲夫; born 1961), Japanese manga artist
- Tetsuo Imai (今井 哲夫; 1912–1987), Japanese middle-distance runner
- Tetsuo Inoue (井上 哲夫), Japanese table tennis player
- Tetsuo Kagawa (香川 哲男; born 1969), Japanese astronomer
- Tetsuo Kutsukake (沓掛 哲男; born 1929), Japanese politician
- Tetsuo Najita (奈地田 哲夫; 1936–2021), American historian
- Tetsuo Saito (斉藤 鉄夫; born 1952), Japanese politician
- Tetsuo Sakurai (櫻井 哲夫; born 1957), Japanese jazz fusion bassist
- Tetsuo Sato (rower) (佐藤 哲夫; born 1938), Japanese rower
- Tetsuo Satō (volleyball) (佐藤 哲夫; born 1949), Japanese volleyball player
- Tetsuo Shinohara (篠原 哲雄; born 1962), Japanese film director
- Tetsuo Toyama (当山 哲夫, 1883–1971), Okinawan journalist

== Fictional characters ==
- Tetsuo Kaga (加賀 鉄男), a character in the manga series Hikaru no Go
- Tetsuo Okita, a character in the film The Bullet Train
- Tetsuo Shima (島 鉄雄), a character in the manga series Akira
- Tetsuo Sinkkonen, a character in the film Vares: Private Eye
- Tetsuo Takahashi (高橋 鉄男), protagonist of the manga series Interviews with Monster Girls
- Tetsuo Nikaido, Main Antagonist of Yakuza: Dead Souls
- Tetsuo Takeda, a character in the anime series Yu-Gi-Oh! Zexal
- Tetsuo Kameyama, a character in the anime and game series Little Battlers Experience
- Tetsuo, an unlockable character in the videogame Speed Freaks
- an unnamed salaryman, serving as the abstract description of an horrific transformation, that translates into "iron man" Tetsuo: The Iron Man
