= Duffin =

Duffin is a surname, and may refer to:

- Adam Duffin (1841–1924), Irish unionist politician
- Graeme Duffin (born 1956), Scottish guitarist
- Jackie Duffin (born 1950), Canadian medical historian and hematologist
- Richard Duffin (1909–1996), American physicist
- Shay Duffin (1931–2010), American actor
- Terry Duffin (born 1982), Zimbabwean cricketer
