= Duff (nickname) =

Duff is a nickname of:

- Duff Armstrong (1833–1899), American soldier successfully defended by Abraham Lincoln against the charge of murder
- Duff Goldman (born 1974), star of Food Network's reality show Ace of Cakes
- Duff Holbrook (1923–2015), American wildlife biologist, forester and outdoorsman
- John Lowe (musician) (1942–2024), English pianist for The Quarrymen, a forerunner of The Beatles
- Duff McKagan (born 1964), bassist of Guns N' Roses and former bassist of Velvet Revolver
- Duff Pattullo (1873–1956), Canadian politician, 22nd premier of British Columbia
- Dufferin Roblin (1917–2010), Canadian businessman and politician
