= Daniel Sparks (politician) =

American politician

Daniel H. Sparks

Member of the Mississippi Senate from the 5th district
- Incumbent
- Assumed office January 7, 2020
- Preceded by: J. P. Wilemon

Personal details
- Born: Cleveland, MS, U.S.
- Party: Republican
- Education: Northeast Mississippi Community College (attended); University of Mississippi (B.Accy), (M.Tax); University of Mississippi School of Law (JD)
- Occupation: Attorney, adjunct professor

Daniel H. Sparks (born 1974) is an American politician and attorney who has served in the Mississippi State Senate from the 5th district since 2020.

== Early life and education ==
Sparks was born in Cleveland and grew up in Belmont as the son of a third-grade teacher and a preacher. He attended Belmont High School. Afterwards, he attended Northeast Mississippi College and later graduated from the University of Mississippi with a Bachelor of Accountancy. He went on to get a Master of Taxation in 2005 at the University of Mississippi and his Juris Doctor in 2008 at the University of Mississippi School of Law.

== Career ==
Sparks worked in the wholesale grocery business for seven years, which he states is what inspired him to return to the University of Mississippi to continue his education. As an attorney, he founded his own practice, Sparks Law Firm, and became an adjunct professor at the University of Mississippi where he taught business law.

Upon the death of Alan Nunnelee, Sparks ran in the 2015 special election for Mississippi's 1st congressional district, where he got 3.2% of the vote.

In 2019, he ran in the Mississippi State Senate election for the 5th district. He secured 53.0% of the vote in the Republican primary and 72.1% in the general election; he assumed office on January 7, 2020.

For the 2024 session, he chairs the Economic and Workforce Development committee, the vice-chair for Judiciary, Division B committee, and is a member of Business and Financial Institutions, Corrections, Drug Policy, Finance, Government Structure, Ports and Marine Resources, and Universities and Colleges committees.

== Political Positions ==
Sparks voted against a bill to change the Mississippi state flag.

== Personal life ==
Sparks is a member of the National Rifle Association of America (NRA), Police Benevolent Association, Mississippi Bar Association, and the Federalist Society. He resides in Belmont, MS and is a member of the Liberty Church of Christ.
