= Wilson House =

Wilson House may refer to:

== Canada ==
- Wilson House (Meech Lake), Quebec, location of the 1987 constitutional consensus

== England ==
- Wilson House, London

== United States ==
- McKleroy-Wilson-Kirby House, Anniston, Alabama
- Catlin Wilson House, Eutaw, Alabama
- Wilson-Clements House, Northport, Alabama, listed on the NRHP in Alabama
- Wilson-Finlay House, Gainestown, Alabama
- Wilson-Pittman-Campbell-Gregory House, Fayetteville, Arkansas
- Wilson House (Russellville, Arkansas)
- Wilson Hall-Arkansas Tech University, Russellville, Arkansas, listed on the NRHP in Arkansas
- Wilson-Martin House, Warren, Arkansas
- C. J. (Blinky) Wilson House, Casa Grande, Arizona, listed on the NRHP in Arizona
- Charles Wilson, Jr., House, Flagstaff, Arizona, listed on the NRHP in Arizona
- J. Mark Wilson House, Safford, Arizona, listed on the NRHP in Arizona
- J. C. Wilson House, Willcox, Arizona, listed on the NRHP in Arizona
- Wilson House (Silver Lake, Los Angeles), California, listed as a Los Angeles HCM
- Wilson House (Palo Alto, California)
- Warren Wilson Beach House, Venice, California
- Blanche A. Wilson House, Aurora, Colorado
- John Wilson House (Jewett City, Connecticut)
- Edward R. Wilson House, Newark, Delaware
- Savin-Wilson House, Smyrna, Delaware
- Woodrow Wilson House (Washington, D.C.)
- Wilson House (Pensacola, Florida), a work of architect Bruce Goff similar to his Donald Pollock House
- Dr. C. B. Wilson House, Sarasota, Florida
- Judge William Wilson House, Atlanta, Georgia
- Woodrow Wilson Boyhood Home, Augusta, Georgia
- Wilson-Finney-Land House, Madison, Georgia
- Wilson House (Cambridge, Idaho)
- Judge Isaac Wilson House, Batavia, Illinois
- Wilson-Courtney House, Danville, Indiana
- Barnett-Seawright-Wilson House, Delphi, Indiana
- The Wilson (Indianapolis, Indiana)
- J. Woodrow Wilson House, Marion, Indiana
- Solomon Wilson Building, Wabash, Indiana
- Knapp-Wilson House, Ames, Iowa, listed on the NRHP in Iowa
- Asa Wilson House, Bloomfield, Iowa
- John Wilson House (De Soto, Iowa)
- Seth and Elizabeth Wilson House, Earlham, Iowa
- US Senator James F. Wilson House, Fairfield, Iowa
- Anson Wilson House, Maquoketa, Iowa
- Wilson-Boyle House, Wichita, Kansas, listed on the NRHP in Sedgwick County, Kansas
- Fred D. Wilson House, Wichita, Kansas, listed on the NRHP in Sedgwick County, Kansas
- Gordon Wilson Hall, Bowling Green, Kentucky, listed on the NRHP in Kentucky
- William Wilson House (Elizabethtown, Kentucky), listed on the NRHP in Kentucky
- R. H. Wilson House, Greensburg, Kentucky, listed on the NRHP in Kentucky
- Paul Wilson Place, Lancaster, Kentucky, listed on the NRHP in Kentucky
- Scott and Wilson Houses District, Lexington, Kentucky, listed on the NRHP in Kentucky
- David Wilson House, Louisville, Kentucky, listed on the NRHP in Kentucky
- Benjamin Wilson House, Versailles, Kentucky, listed on the NRHP in Kentucky
- Wilson Hall (Bucksport, Maine)
- Rufus Wilson Complex, Clear Spring, Maryland
- Wilson-Miller Farm, Sharpsburg, Maryland
- Wilson's Inheritance, Union Bridge, Maryland
- Capt. John Wilson House and Bates Ship Chandlery, Cohasset, Massachusetts
- Shoreborne Wilson House, Ipswich, Massachusetts
- Judge Robert S. Wilson House, Ann Arbor, Michigan
- Wilson Barn, Livonia, Michigan
- Hudson Wilson House, Faribault, Minnesota, listed on the NRHP in Minnesota
- Brown-Wilson House, Enterprise, Mississippi, listed on the NRHP in Mississippi
- Wilson House (Monticello, Mississippi), listed on the NRHP in Mississippi
- Ephraim J. Wilson Farm Complex, Palmyra, Missouri
- Wilson House (Alberton, Montana)
- Victor E. Wilson House, Stromsburg, Nebraska, listed on the NRHP in Nebraska
- Seabrook–Wilson House, Port Monmouth, New Jersey
- Warren Wilson House, Cape Vincent, New York
- Wilson House (Garrison, New York)
- Albert E. and Emily Wilson House, Mamaroneck, New York
- Aaron Wilson House, Ovid, New York
- Wilson House (Oyster Bay, New York), a house on the Oyster Bay History Walk tour
- Edmund Wilson House, Port Leyden, New York
- Milton Wilson House, Rushville, New York
- Wilson Cottage, Saranac Lake, New York
- Wilson-Vines House, Beaver Dam, North Carolina
- John E. Wilson House, Dunn, North Carolina
- William J. Wilson House, Gastonia, North Carolina
- Lucy and J. Vassie Wilson House, High Point, North Carolina
- Wilson Log House, Highlands, North Carolina
- Rudisill-Wilson House, Newton, North Carolina
- Wilfong-Wilson Farm, Startown, North Carolina
- Wilson-Gibson House, Cincinnati, Ohio
- Samuel and Sally Wilson House, Cincinnati, Ohio
- George D. Wilson House, Madison, Ohio, listed on the NRHP in Ohio
- John T. Wilson Homestead, Seaman, Ohio, listed on the NRHP in Ohio
- Wilson-Lenox House, Sidney, Ohio
- Valentine Wilson House, Somerford, Ohio
- Wilson Feed Mill, Valley View, Ohio
- Willie W. Wilson House, Fort Towson, Oklahoma, listed on the NRHP in Oklahoma
- James O. Wilson House, Corvallis, Oregon, listed on the NRHP in Oregon
- Andrew P. Wilson House, Milwaukie, Oregon, listed on the NRHP in Oregon
- Jacobs-Wilson House, Portland, Oregon
- Wilson-South House, Portland, Oregon
- William T. E. Wilson Homestead, Sisters, Oregon
- George Wilson Homestead, Centennial, Pennsylvania
- Robert Wilson House, Coatesville, Pennsylvania
- Wilson-Winslow House, Coventry, Rhode Island
- Thomas Woodrow Wilson Boyhood Home, Columbia, South Carolina
- Wilson House (Fort Mill, South Carolina)
- John Calvin Wilson House, Indiantown, South Carolina
- Wilson-Clary House, Laurens, South Carolina
- Monroe Wilson House, Ridgeway, South Carolina
- Wilson House (York, South Carolina)
- Greenberry Wilson House, Burke, Tennessee, listed on the NRHP in Tennessee
- Wilson-Young House, Dellrose, Tennessee
- Boyd-Wilson Farm, Franklin, Tennessee
- Joseph Wilson House, Franklin, Tennessee
- Sanford Wilson House, Fredonia, Tennessee
- Wilson Homesite, Clifton, Texas, listed on the NRHP in Texas
- Wilson House (Houston, Texas), listed on the NRHP in Texas
- A. G. Wilson House, McKinney, Texas, listed on the NRHP in Texas
- Ammie Wilson House, Plano, Texas
- Homer Wilson Ranch, Santa Elena Junction, Texas
- Ralph and Sunny Wilson, Sr. House, Temple, Texas, see the National Register of Historic Places listings in Bell County, Texas
- Wilson House and Farmstead, Midway, Utah
- Wilson-Shields House, Park City, Utah, listed on the NRHP in Utah
- William W. and Christene Wilson House, Sandy, Utah, listed on the NRHP in Utah
- Woodrow Wilson Birthplace, Staunton, Virginia
- Bill Wilson House, East Dorset, Vermont
- Mary Park Wilson House, Gerrardstown, West Virginia
- William Wilson House (Gerrardstown, West Virginia)
- Wilson-Kuykendall Farm, Moorefield, West Virginia
- Wilson-Wodrow-Mytinger House, Romney, West Virginia

== See also ==
- John Wilson House (disambiguation)
- William Wilson House (disambiguation)
- Woodrow Wilson House (disambiguation)
- Wilson Bridge (disambiguation)
- Wilson Building (disambiguation)
- Wilson Hall (disambiguation)
- Wilson School (disambiguation)
