= Jacobs House =

Jacobs House may refer to:

in the United States

(by state, then town or city)

- Judge Fred C. Jacobs House, Phoenix, Arizona, listed on the National Register of Historic Places (NRHP)
- Jacobs House (Wickenburg, Arizona), listed on the NRHP in Maricopa County
- Moore–Jacobs House, Clarendon, Arkansas, listed on the NRHP in Monroe County
- O'Kane–Jacobs House, Altus, Arkansas, listed on the NRHP in Franklin County
- Cyrus Jacobs House, Boise, Idaho, listed on the NRHP in Ada County
- Johnston-Jacobs House, Georgetown, Kentucky, NRHP-listed
- Eugene Jacobs House, Owosso, Michigan, listed on the NRHP in Shiawassee County
- Michael Jacobs House, Columbus, Montana, listed on the NRHP in Stillwater County
- Felix A. Jacobs House, Columbus, Ohio, listed on the NRHP in Columbus
- Jacobs–Wilson House, Portland, Oregon, NRHP-listed
- Durham–Jacobs House, Portland, Oregon, NRHP-listed
- Benjamin Jacobs House, West Whiteland Township, Pennsylvania, NRHP-listed
- Herbert and Katherine Jacobs First House, Madison, Wisconsin, NRHP-listed
- Herbert and Katherine Jacobs Second House, Madison, Wisconsin, NRHP-listed
