= John Wilson House =

John Wilson House may refer to:

- John Wilson House (Jewett City, Connecticut), listed on the NRHP in Connecticut
- John Wilson House (De Soto, Iowa), listed on the NRHP in Dallas County, Iowa
- John E. Wilson House, Dunn, North Carolina, listed on the NRHP in Sampson County, North Carolina
- John T. Wilson Homestead, Seaman, Ohio, listed on the NRHP in Adams County, Ohio
- John Calvin Wilson House, Indiantown, South Carolina, listed on the NRHP in Williamsburg County, South Carolina

== See also ==
- Wilson House (disambiguation)
