= William Wilson House =

William Wilson House may refer to:

- William Wilson House (Elizabethtown, Kentucky), listed on the National Register of Historic Places (NRHP) in Kentucky
- William J. Wilson House, Gastonia, North Carolina, NRHP-listed
- Willie W. Wilson House, Fort Towson, Oklahoma, listed on the NRHP in Oklahoma
- William T. E. Wilson Homestead, Sisters, Oregon, NRHP-listed
- William W. and Christene Wilson House, Sandy, Utah, listed on the NRHP in Utah
- William Wilson House (Gerrardstown, West Virginia), listed on the NRHP in West Virginia

== See also ==
- Wilson House (disambiguation)
