= Wilson Hall =

Wilson Hall may refer to:

- Wilson Hall (rugby league), New Zealand rugby league footballer of the 1920s and 1930s
- Wilson Hall (Bucksport, Maine), a historic Methodist seminary building
- Wilson Hall (Arkansas Tech University), Russellville, Arkansas, U.S.
- Wilson Hall (Miami University), Oxford, Ohio, U.S.
- Wilson Hall, University of Melbourne, Australia
- Wilson Hall, at Fermilab
- Wilson Hall, a member of music group God's Pottery

== See also ==
- Woodrow Wilson Hall, James Madison University
- Woodrow Wilson Hall, or Shadow Lawn, at Monmouth University, West Long Branch, New Jersey
- Wilson House (disambiguation)
