= Boyd Mill Ruins =

- U.S. National Register of Historic Places
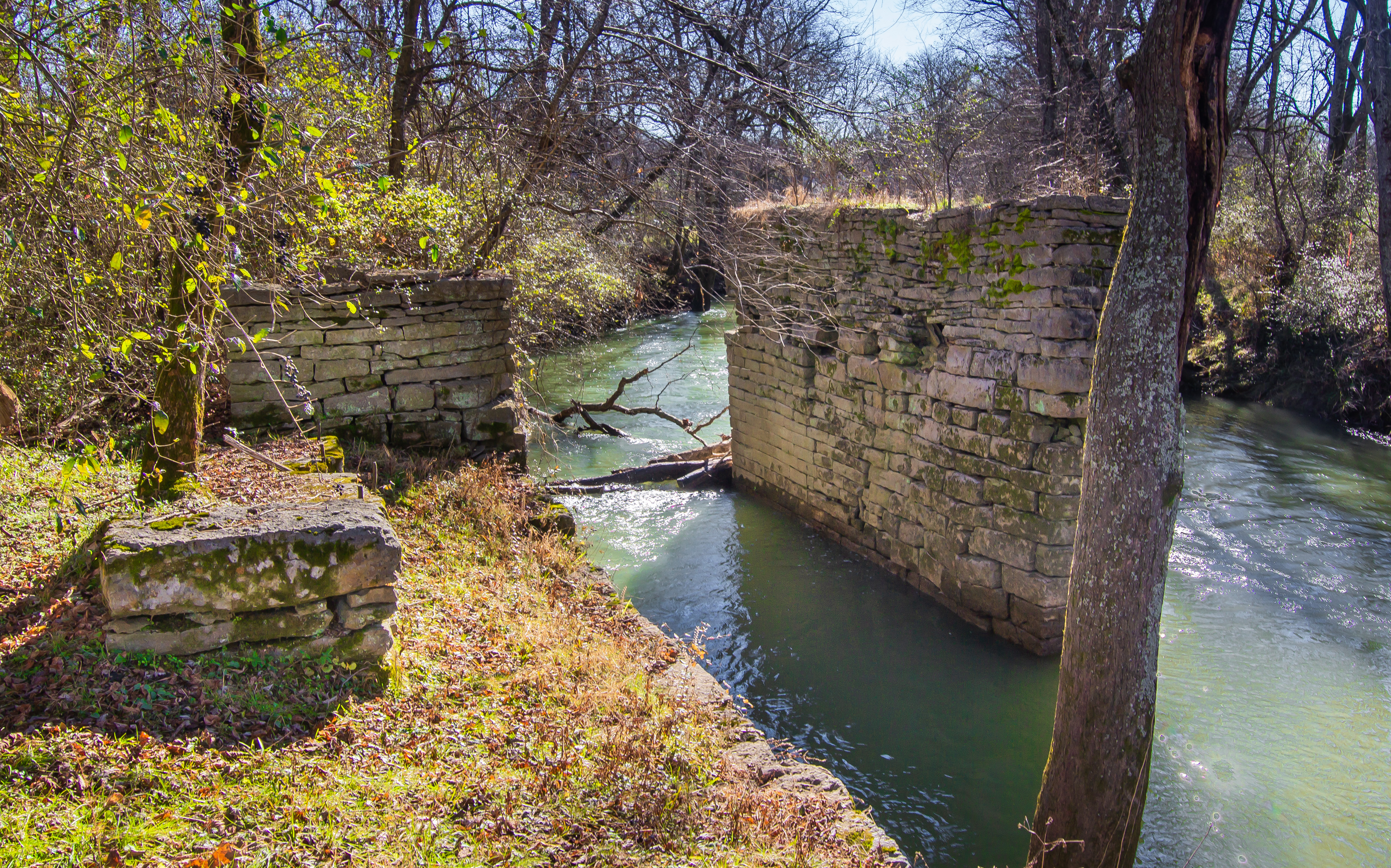
- Boyd Mill Ruins

- Location within Tennessee Location within the United States
- Location: E bank of the West Harpeth River, 1/10 mi. S of Boxley Valley Rd. and Boyd Mill Pike, Franklin, Tennessee
- Coordinates: 35°55′15″N 86°58′1″W
- Area: less than 1 acre (0.40 ha)
- Built: early 19th century
- MPS: Williamson County MRA
- NRHP reference No.: 88000285

Significant dates
- NRIS dates of significance: c.1840, c.1900
- Added to NRHP: April 13, 1988

Boyd Mill Ruins is a property in Franklin, Tennessee that was listed on the National Register of Historic Places in 1988. The mill was originally built in the early 19th century and was powered by the West Harpeth River. It played a crucial role in the local economy, producing flour and cornmeal for area farmers for over 50 years. At its peak, it was one of about a dozen water-powered mills operating in Williamson County during the 19th century.

The mill ceased operation around 1900 and subsequently fell into disrepair. Despite this, the stone foundations and turbine pit of the Boyd Mill remain more intact than those of any other former mill in the county, making it a valuable example of the milling industry's importance in 19th-century commerce.

The mill was part of the W.A. Boyd farm, which was one of the larger farms or plantations in Williamson County before and after the American Civil War. Unlike many other farms that were reduced in size after the war, the Boyd farm remained substantial, encompassing 528 acres, including the Boyd Mill.

The 157 acre Boyd-Wilson Farm, a century farm that is now also NRHP-listed, includes the Boyd Mill Ruins.

== See also ==
- William Boyd House
