= Andrew Crockett =

Andrew Crockett may refer to:

- Andrew Crockett (banker) (1943–2012)
- Andrew Crockett, Tennessee settler, of Andrew Crockett House
