= Daniel McMahan House =

Historic house in Tennessee, United States

- U.S. National Register of Historic Places
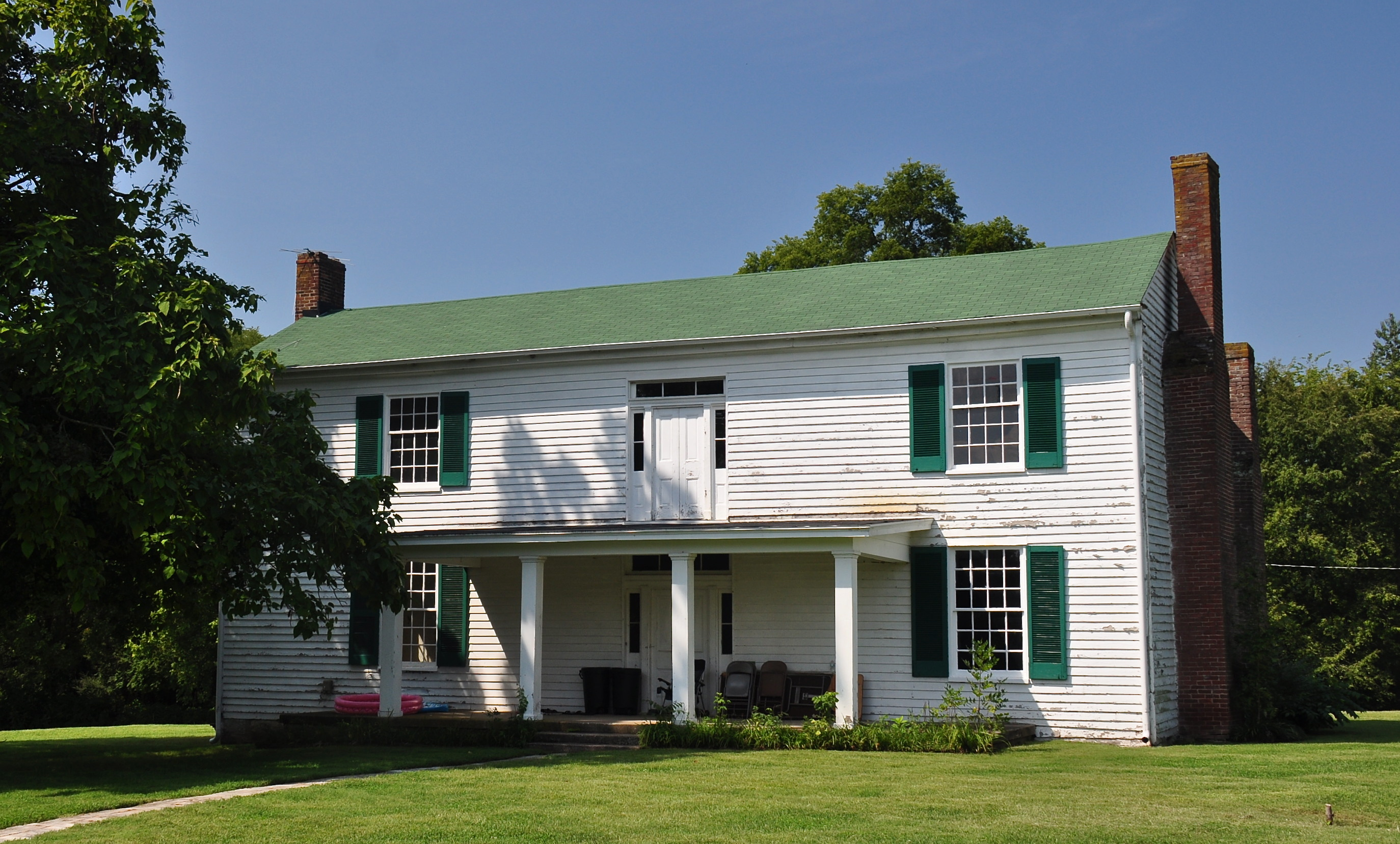
- Daniel McMahan House, September 2014

- Location within Tennessee Location within the United States
- Location: Spencer Creek Rd. 1/2 mi. W of Franklin Rd., Franklin, Tennessee
- Coordinates: 35°56′42″N 86°51′37″W
- Area: 2.3 acres (0.93 ha)
- Built: c. 1800, c. 1850 and c. 1900
- Architectural style: Central passage plan
- MPS: Williamson County MRA
- NRHP reference No.: 88000331
- Added to NRHP: April 13, 1988

The Daniel McMahan House is a property in Franklin, Tennessee, United States, that dates from c. 1800 and that was listed on the National Register of Historic Places in 1988.

It includes Central passage plan and other architecture. When listed the property included one contributing building and two contributing structures on an area of 2.3 acres (0.93 ha).

Daniel McMahan was one of the early settlers of the region. His house is one of five log buildings built during 1798 to 1800, during the earliest settling of the area, which survive to today. Others, also NRHP-listed, are: the David McEwen House, the Andrew Crockett House, the William Ogilvie House, and the William Boyd House.
