= William Ogilvie House =

Historic house in Tennessee, United States

- U.S. National Register of Historic Places
- Location within Tennessee Location within the United States
- Location: West side of US 31A, 1 mi (1.6 km) south of College Grove, Tennessee
- Coordinates: 35°46′22″N 86°41′17″W
- Area: 73.5 acres (29.7 ha)
- Built: c. 1800, c. 1830 and c. 1850
- Architectural style: Log pen
- MPS: Williamson County MRA
- NRHP reference No.: 88000323
- Added to NRHP: April 14, 1988

The William Ogilvie House is a property in College Grove, Tennessee, United States, dating from c. 1800 that was listed on the National Register of Historic Places in 1988. It includes log pen and other architecture. When listed the property included two contributing buildings, five contributing structures, and one non-contributing site on an area of 73.5 acres (29.7 ha).

This house is one of five log buildings built during 1798 to 1800, during the earliest settling of the area, which survive to today. Others, also NRHP-listed, are the David McEwen House, the Andrew Crockett House, the Daniel McMahan House, and the William Boyd House.
