= Christopher McEwen House =

Historic house in Tennessee, United States

- Formerly listed on the U.S. National Register of Historic Places
- Location: Franklin Rd. 2/10 mi. S of Berrys Chapel Rd., Franklin, Tennessee
- Area: 15 acres (6.1 ha)
- Built: c. 1836, c. 1900 and c. 1920
- Architectural style: Federal and Colonial Revival
- MPS: Williamson County MRA
- NRHP reference No.: 88000320
- Removed from NRHP: March 23, 1995

The Christopher McEwen House was a property in Franklin, Tennessee that was listed on the National Register of Historic Places, but later was removed from the Register, in 1995.

It was built in c.1836 and included Federal and Colonial Revival architecture.

When listed the property included four contributing buildings and one non-contributing structure on an area of 15 acres (6.1 ha).

Its NRHP eligibility was addressed in a 1988 study of Williamson County historical resources.

It was removed from the Register in 1995. Usually when a property is removed that means its historic building(s) have been demolished or otherwise lost their historic integrity.

== See also ==
- David McEwen House, also NRHP-listed in Franklin, Tennessee
