= David McEwen House =

Historic house in Tennessee, United States

- U.S. National Register of Historic Places
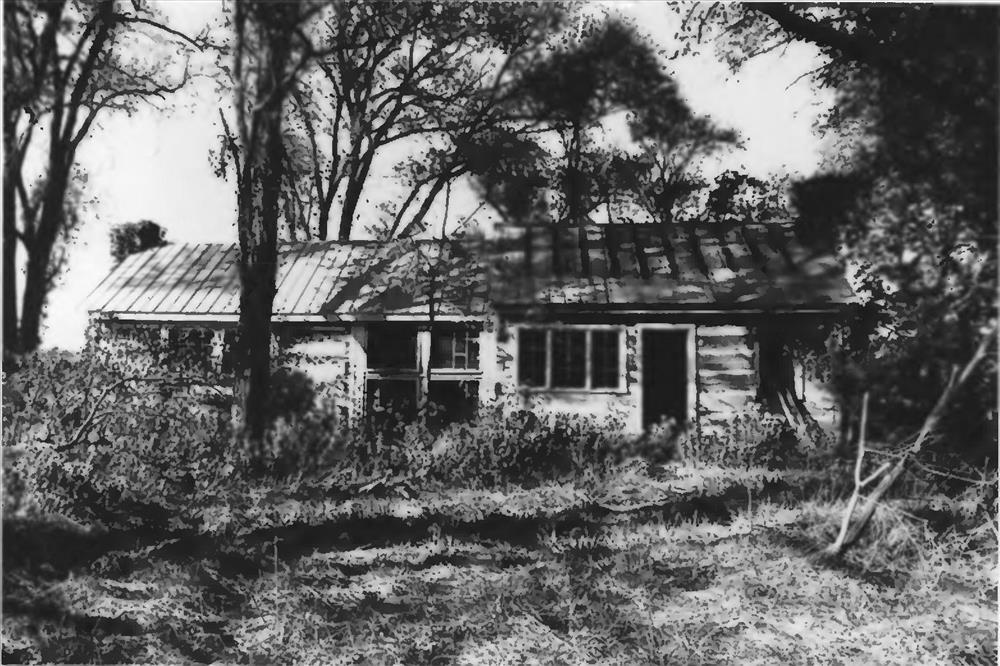

- Location within Tennessee Location within the United States
- Location: Off the E side of Franklin Rd./US 31 2/10 mi. N of Spencer Creek Rd., Franklin, Tennessee
- Coordinates: 35.94480°N 86.83725°W
- Area: 1 acre (0.40 ha)
- Built: c. 1798 and c. 1830
- Architect: David McEwen
- Architectural style: Dogtrot log cabin
- MPS: Williamson County MRA
- NRHP reference No.: 88000360
- Added to NRHP: April 13, 1988

The David McEwen House is a property in Franklin, Tennessee, United States that was listed on the National Register of Historic Places in 1988. It dates from c. 1798. It includes Dogtrot log cabin architecture.

This house is one of five log buildings built during 1798 to 1800 (the earliest non-indigenous settling of the area) which survive to the present. Others, also NRHP-listed, are: the William Ogilvie House, the Andrew Crockett House, the Daniel McMahan House, and the William Boyd House.

== See also ==
- Christopher McEwen House, also NRHP-listed in Franklin, Tennessee
