= Eugene Jacobs House =

Historic place in Michigan, United States

- U.S. National Register of Historic Places
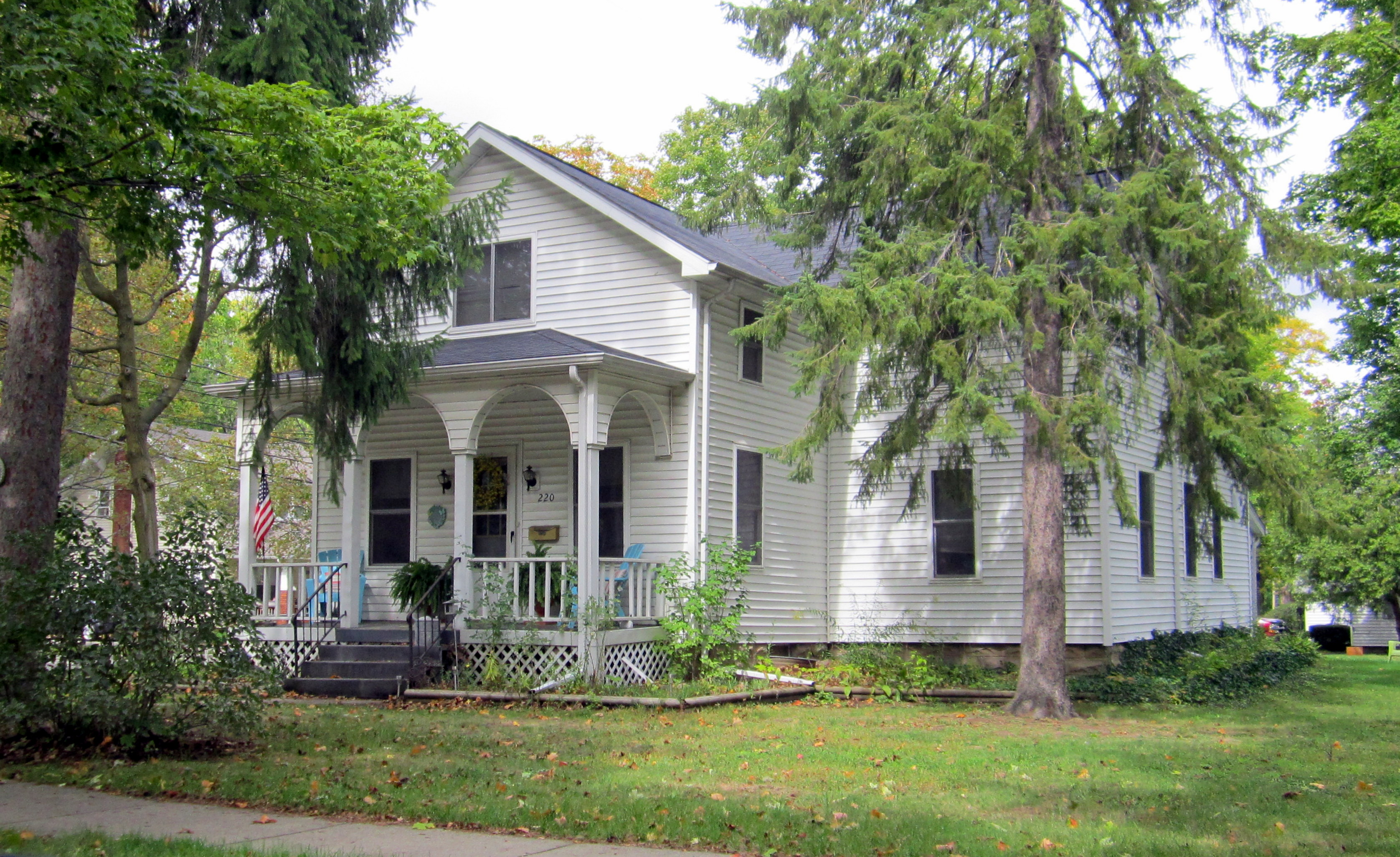
- Interactive map
- Location: 220 W. King St., Owosso, Michigan
- Coordinates: 43°00′18″N 84°10′23″W
- Area: less than one acre
- Built: 1856
- Architectural style: Mixed (more Than 2 Styles From Different Periods)
- MPS: Owosso MRA
- NRHP reference No.: 80004553
- Added to NRHP: November 4, 1980

The Eugene Jacobs House is a residential building located at 520 North Adams Street in Owosso, Michigan. It was listed on the National Register of Historic Places in 1980.

== History ==
This house was constructed around 1856 by Eugene Jacobs.

== Description ==
The Eugene Jacobs House is unique in the area for its architectural qualities. The structure is basically a simple wood-framed two-story home clad with clapboard. The core design is a Greek Revival style, featuring simple window placement, an unadorned corniceline, and broad fasica boards common to the style. However, the house was repeatedly "modernized" in subsequent years, and displays elements of Italianate, Stick, Queen Anne, Eastlake, Second Renaissance Revival, and Georgian Revival styles in addition to the original Greek Revival. These elements include a Palladian-inspired window in the gable end, jig-sawed detailing on the porch columns, S-scrolled brackets in the arcade's spandrels, and an ornate balustrade on the porch roofline.
