= Boyd–Wilson Farm =

- U.S. National Register of Historic Places
- U.S. Historic district
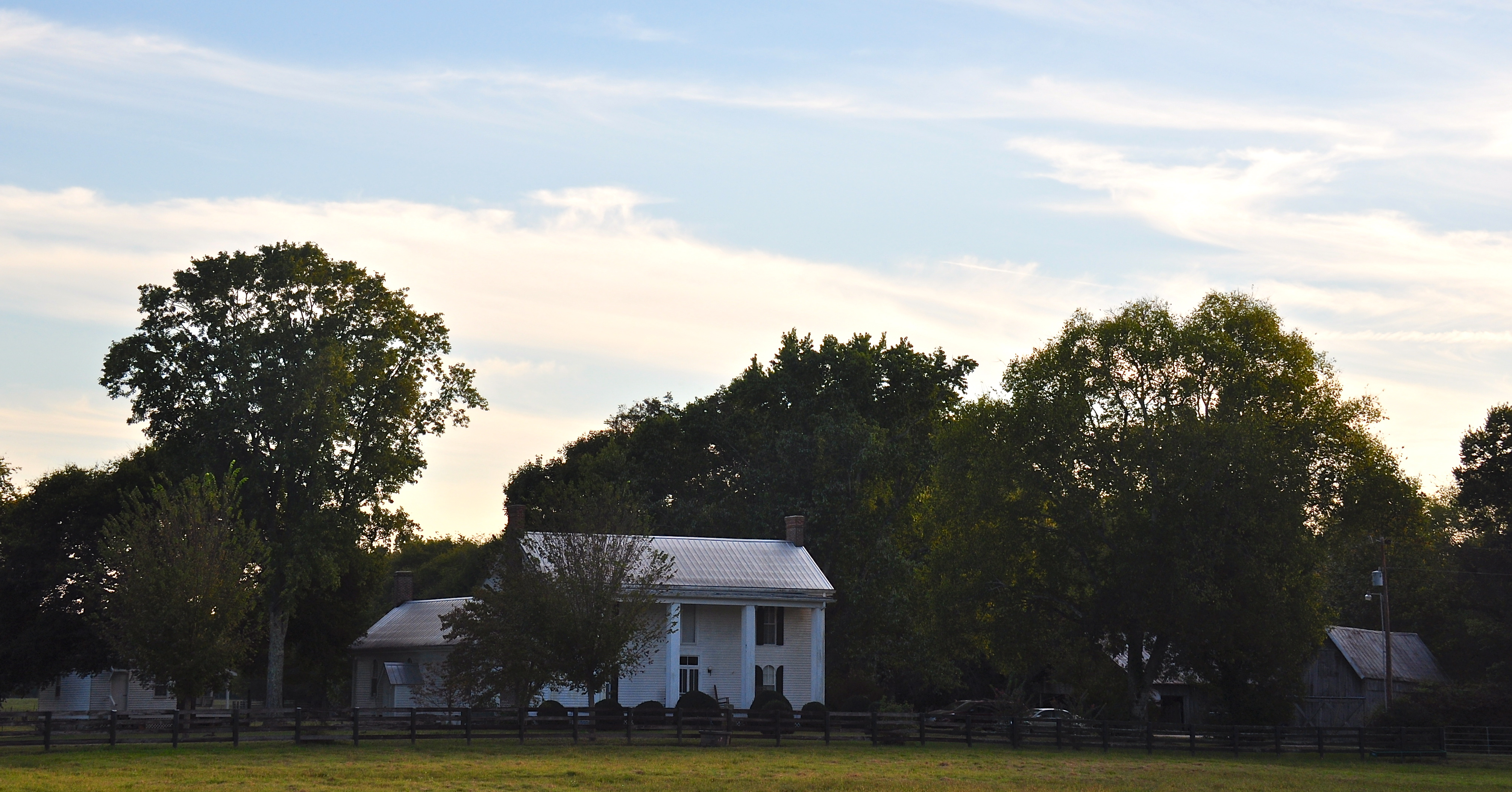
- Boyd–Wilson Farm, September 2014

- Location within Tennessee Location within the United States
- Location: 3209 Boxley Valley Rd., Franklin, Tennessee
- Coordinates: 35°54′52″N 86°58′5″W
- Area: 157 acres (64 ha)
- Built: c. 1840, c. 1884 and c. 1920
- Architectural style: I-house
- MPS: Historic Family Farms in Middle Tennessee MPS
- NRHP reference No.: 96000748
- Added to NRHP: July 5, 1996

The Boyd–Wilson Farm is a 157-acre (64 ha) historic district in Franklin, Tennessee, United States. The circa 1840 farm includes an I-house.

The district was listed on the National Register of Historic Places in 1996. When listed, it included six contributing buildings, two contributing structures, one contributing site and two non-contributing buildings.

The farm's west edge is the West Harpeth River. The property includes the historic Boyd Mill Ruins (separately listed on the National Register).

The farmhouse's north, two-story facade was built c.1884 and is of heavy braced frame construction. It has a central hallway and chimneys at its gable ends in what is called an I-house. The chimneys, originally limestone, were modified c.1920 to include brick. It has a two-story portico with four square columns built in 1976 which replaced a one-story portico from c.1884.

It was deemed notable as "one of the few historic farms in Williamson County to retain its agricultural integrity from a period in the county's history when agriculture was the basis of prosperity."

It is a designated Century Farm. Historic notability of properties of this type was covered in a 1994 study of historic family farms in Middle Tennessee.

== See also ==
- Boyd Mill Ruins
- William Boyd House
