= Michael Jacobs House =

Historic house in Montana, United States

- U.S. National Register of Historic Places
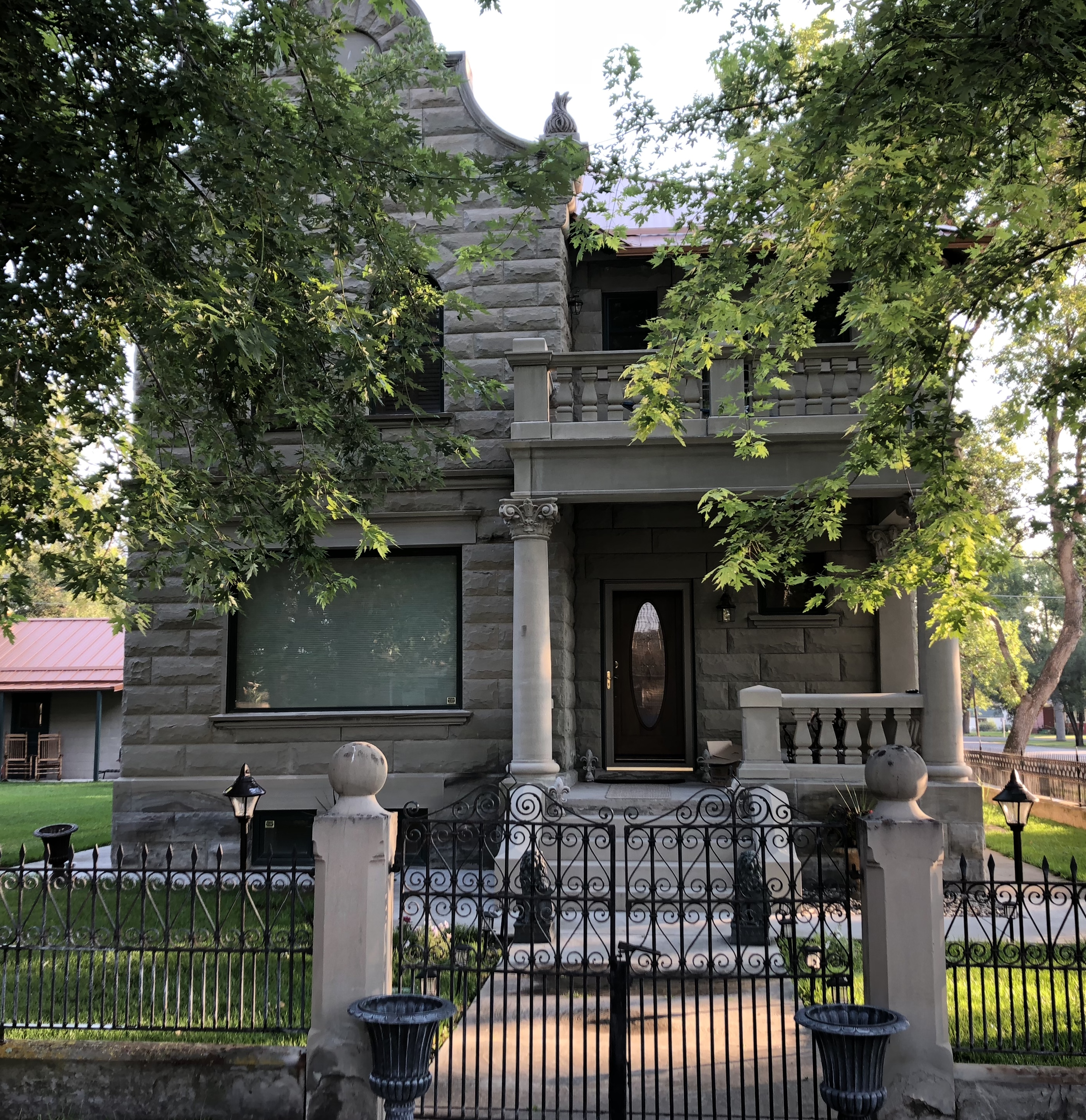

- Location within Montana Location within the United States
- Location: 4 W. First Avenue N, Columbus, Montana
- Coordinates: 45°38′24″N 109°15′33″W
- Area: less than one acre
- Built: 1900-1907
- Built by: Jacobs, Michael
- Architectural style: Renaissance
- NRHP reference No.: 86003676
- Added to NRHP: January 28, 1987

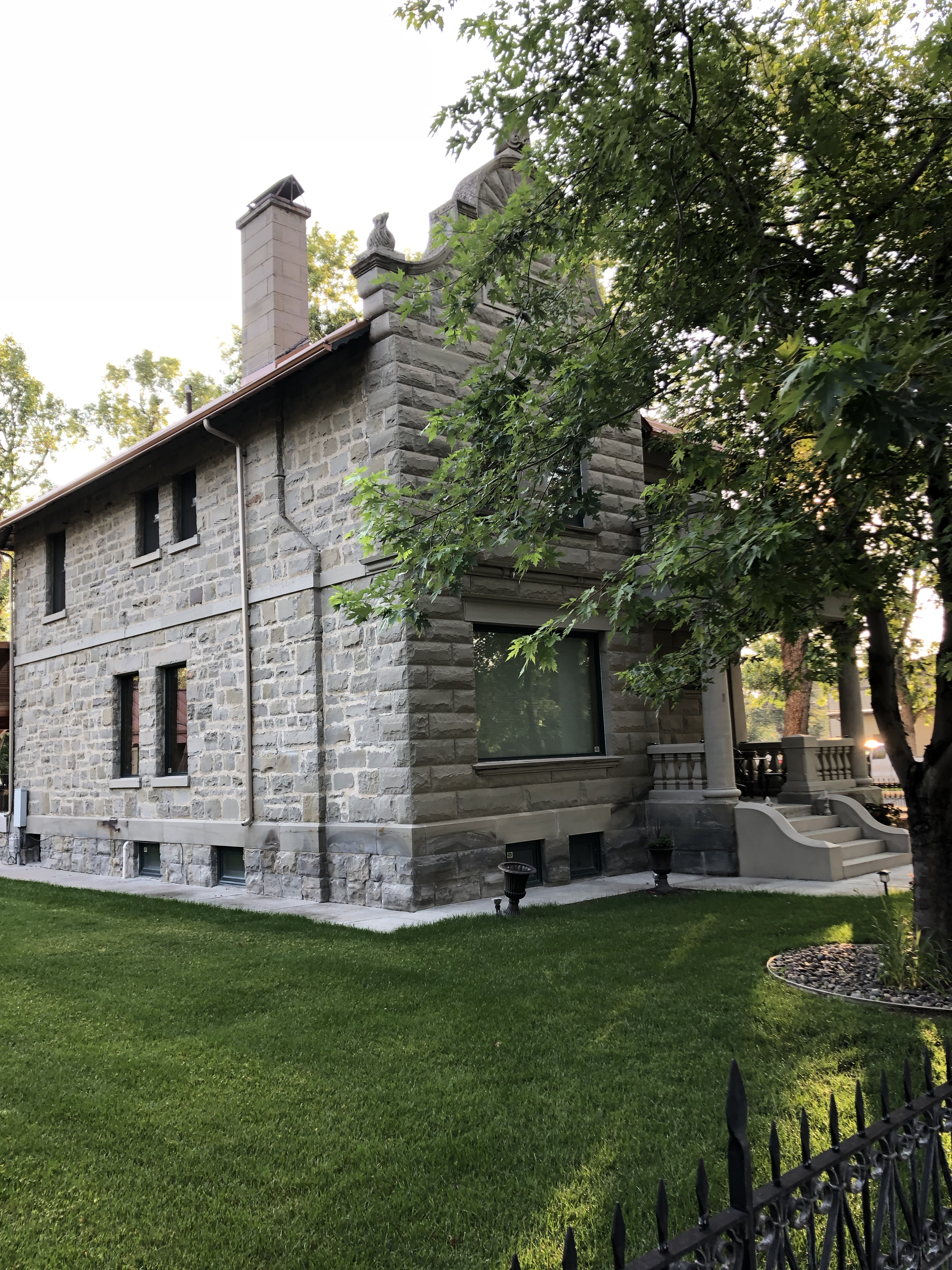
Southwest Corner - Michael Jacobs House

Architect

The Michael Jacobs House, at 4 W. First Avenue North in Columbus in Stillwater County, Montana, also known as the Jacobi House, is a Renaissance Revival-style house built of locally quarried sandstone during 1900–1907. It was listed on the National Register of Historic Places in 1987. It was built by, and home of, Michael Jacobs, an immigrant who later became mayor of Columbus. Michael Jacobs was born in Vinchia Turo, Italy in 1862 as Michael Angelo Jacobucci (he changed his name to Jacobi after coming to America, and then to Jacobs when he settled in Montana). Serving originally as a stone cutter and mason, he apprenticed in the granite and marble quarries of the mountains near his home.

Jacobs originally migrated to Chicago where he began work with a construction firm while studying architecture in night school. He served as an assistant in the design and construction of the Art Institute of Chicago, doing finishing work and carving the lions that grace the entrance of the Institute today. Michael Jacobs was a talented and successful stonemason who used his skills to craft several masonry structures and decorative gravestones in Columbus. He arrived in Columbus with three other expert stone cutters in 1901 to manage the Montana Sandstone Co., a quarry located along the bluffs immediately north of Columbus. His quarrying and carving skills were widely recognized in the state and region. In addition, he was responsible for utilizing vast amounts of sandstone from the quarry he managed for public and private buildings in Wyoming and Montana, including the original State Capitol in Helena, federal buildings in Billings, Butte and Helena, hotels in Forsyth and Havre, high schools in Missoula and Havre and the Missoula Masonic Temple. Known locally as "Daddy Mike," he was, by his death in 1927, recognized as a patriarch, politician and entrepreneur. In 1907, Jacobs advertised with the company as a cut stone contractor, with work executed according to Plans and Details and Delivered to destination Crated and Numbered ready to go in the wall." By 1914, he had expanded his interests to become the owner of the Stillwater Monumental Works Co., with an "Artistic line of monuments manufactured exclusively of Columbus Sand Stone." Jacobs built, owned and managed (with his son) the Atlas Building in Columbus, a combination bowling alley, billiard room, restaurant and saloon. Jacobs was also a successful politician, being elected as an alderman for the 2nd Ward in 1907 and then mayor of Columbus.

Architecture

The Jacobs House or Jacobi House, is built of locally quarried hard sandstone during 1900–1907. The overall size and massing, and outstanding craftsmanship exhibited in the masonry work and stone carving of the Jacobs House contribute to its distinctive, stylistic appearance. The ornate stone Corinthian columns and carved decorations of the Jacobs House provide a sharp contrast to the rustication of the stone blocks. In an effort to present the most attractive facade to the public, the south and east walls of the Jacobs House—those clearly visible from 1st Ave. North and Quarry St.—were finished with finely cut, rock-faced ashlar stone that exhibits thin, precise mortar joints. The builder-architect's Renaissance Revival influence can also be noted in the tall pavilion and carved stone decorations placed along the facade, as well as the hipped roof and rectangular shape, molded stringcourse dividing the first and second floors, and the windows and doors framed with sandstone.

History

The home was built in 1904. After Michael Jacobs death, the home was owned by several local prominent businessmen including bankers, doctors, mayors and mining superintendents.

Historic Registry

This historic building was listed on the National Register of Historic Places by the United States Department of the Interior National Park Service on January 28, 1987, OMB Approval Number #. 1024-0018. Its NRHP nomination states: "Through its ornamental facade and finely crafted ashlar walls, the Renaissance style residence illustrates the outstanding masonry skills and business and political prominence of its builder and original owner, Michael Jacobs. The Michael Jacobs House recently went through a complete restoration. The following is a brief summary of work completed: Brazilian cherry floors, trim, doors, stairs and cabinets, except the kitchen which is solid hickory, radiant heat flooring, Heartland Classic Series appliances with Bosch 42 dBA dishwasher, Renaissance lighting fixtures and door knobs, copper penny roof, upgraded insulation in house and garage and other modernization upgrades."
