= Benjamin Jacobs House =

Historic house in Pennsylvania, United States

- U.S. National Register of Historic Places
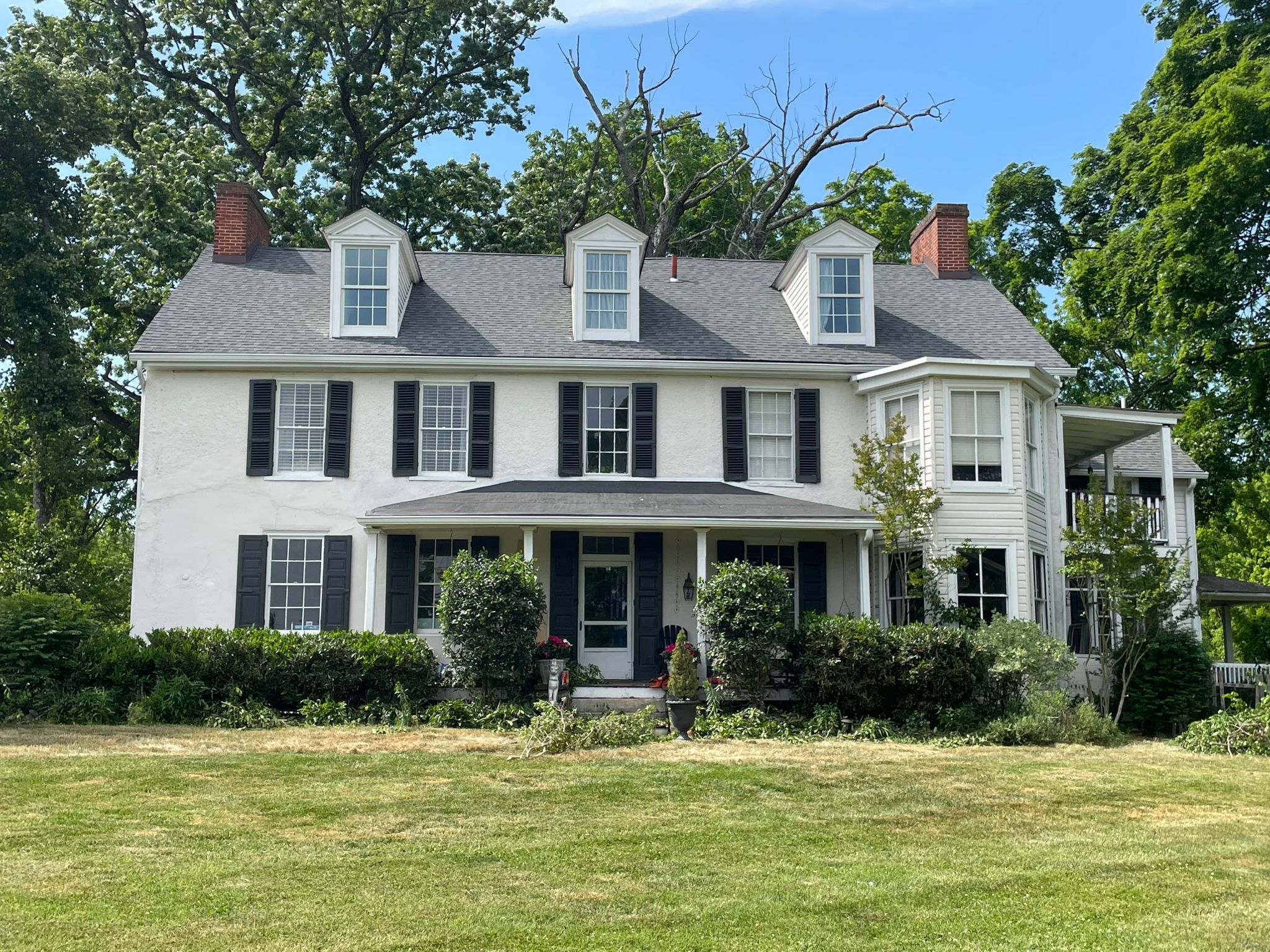
- Benjamin Jacobs House, May 2024

- Location within Pennsylvania Location within the United States
- Location: 375 N. Ship Rd., West Whiteland Township, Pennsylvania
- Coordinates: 40°2′23″N 75°37′6″W
- Area: 4.6 acres (1.9 ha)
- Built: c. 1790; 236 years ago
- Architectural style: Georgian
- MPS: West Whiteland Township MRA
- NRHP reference No.: 84003274
- Added to NRHP: August 2, 1984

Benjamin Jacobs House is a historic home located in West Whiteland Township, Chester County, Pennsylvania, United States. It was built about 1790, and was originally a two-story, three-bay, double pile side hall stone dwelling in the 2/3 Georgian style. It has a gable roof with dormers. The house has a stone kitchen wing, making the house five bays wide, and frame wing with a two-story porch.

It was listed on the National Register of Historic Places in 1984.
