= Wilson Hall (Miami University) =

Dormitory building in Oxford, Ohio, USA

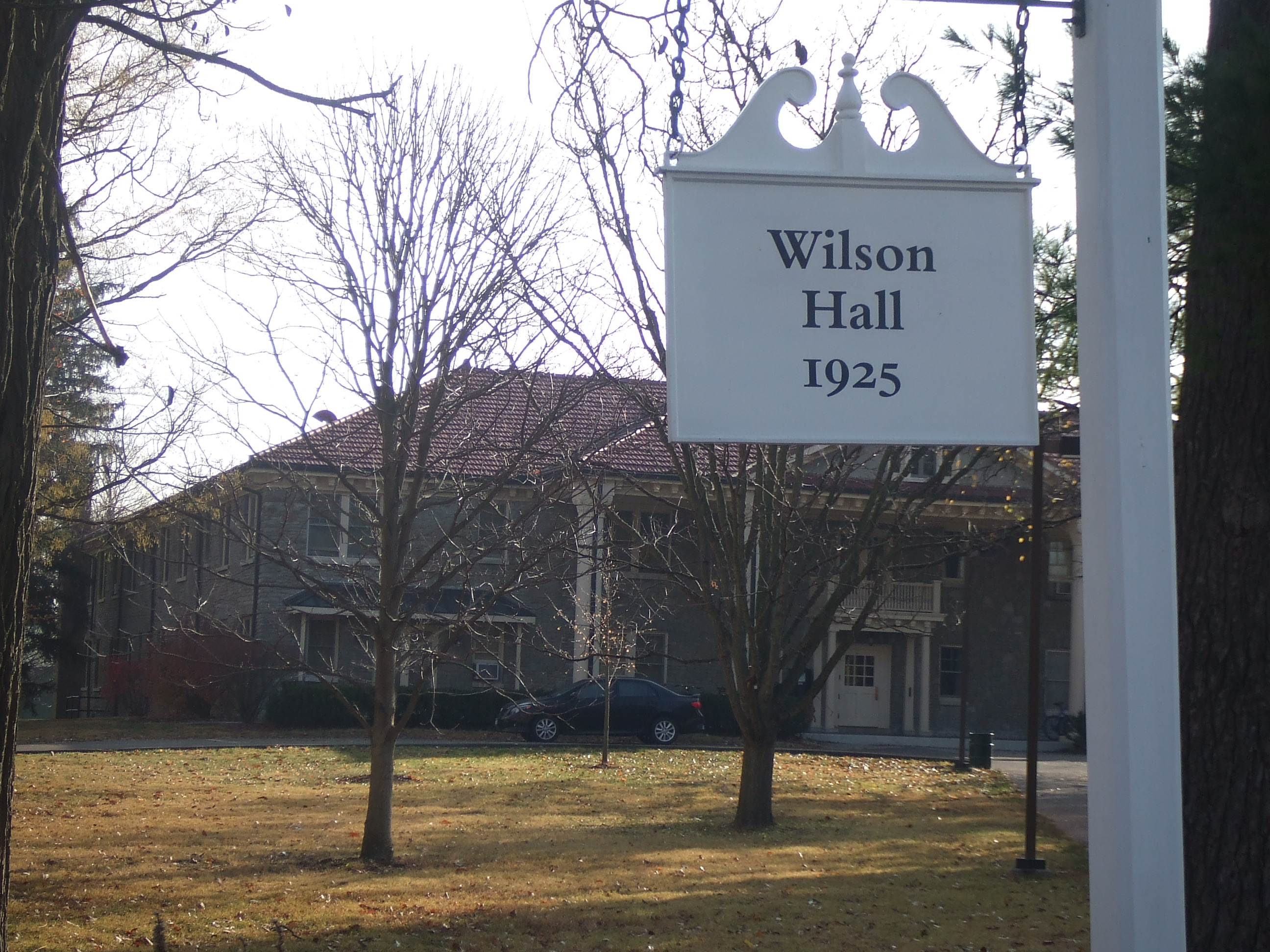
- Wilson Hall in 2010
- Interactive map of the Wilson Hall area
- Former names: The Pines

General information
- Type: Dormitory
- Architectural style: Georgian Architecture
- Location: Oxford, Ohio, United States of America
- Coordinates: 39°30′35.7″N 84°43′36.2″W
- Construction started: 1925
- Inaugurated: June 16, 1986
- Cost: US$110,000.00
- Owner: Miami University

Technical details
- Floor area: 19,667 sq ft (1,827.1 m^{2})

Design and construction
- Architect: J. Wespiser

Wilson Hall, also known as The Pines, was a dormitory building on the campus of Miami University in Oxford, Ohio. Built in 1926 and known before 1986 as "The Pines," The building was originally an annex to a sanatorium known as The Oxford Retreat, and was sold to the university in 1936 for use as a women's dorm. The hall rotated between a men's and women's dorm for most of its existence. The building became disused during the 2015-16 school year, and the university finalized plans in February 2019 to demolish the building that summer to create green space.

== History ==
The building that became Wilson Hall was originally part of The Oxford Retreat, a private hospital "for the treatment of mental and nervous diseases, alcoholic, and narcotic inebriety". The main building, which later became Fisher Hall, was torn down in 1979, and was replaced by the Marcum Hotel and Conference Center. Built in 1926, the annex to the hospital was known as "The Pines," and was set apart from the main building to house women who were not only affected mentally, but who also had “nervous disorders, alcoholic, or narcotic addiction”. The fireproof building consists of native blue limestone with a red tile roof. After Miami bought the main building of The Oxford Retreat in 1925, The Pines became the main and only building used by the sanatorium.

=== Acquisition by Miami ===
During the expansion of Miami University, The Pines became of interest to include in Miami’s campus, and the university signed a contract for the annex building and other residences on the property on July 17, 1936. The large building was to be used “as a dormitory for seventy students”. The residence that was included in the purchase belonged to the family of Dr. Harvey Cook, the son of the founder of The Oxford Retreat. Cook rented the estate from the university until his death, and it is now occupied by campus offices.

=== Usage ===
After $20,025.94 of remodeling, the building, still known as The Pines, began to house students. The building changed frequently from all female to all men’s dorms through the years, serving as a women's dorm from 1936 to 1939, 1941-1942, 1960 to 1971, and during the late 1970s and early 1980s. The building housed men for the 1940-41 school year, from 1946-1960, and for the fall semester of 1971. Since then, the building operated as a co-ed dorm, though The Miami Student reported that the building had not been occupied since the 2015-16 school year.

From 1942 to 1946, the Navy Training School (NTS) that operated at Miami used the building as housing for their radio operator trainees. The US Navy was not the only group to take advantage of the space Miami’s campus had to offer. In 1945 two professional baseball teams, the Columbus Red Birds and the Rochester Red Wings used the Pines for spring training.

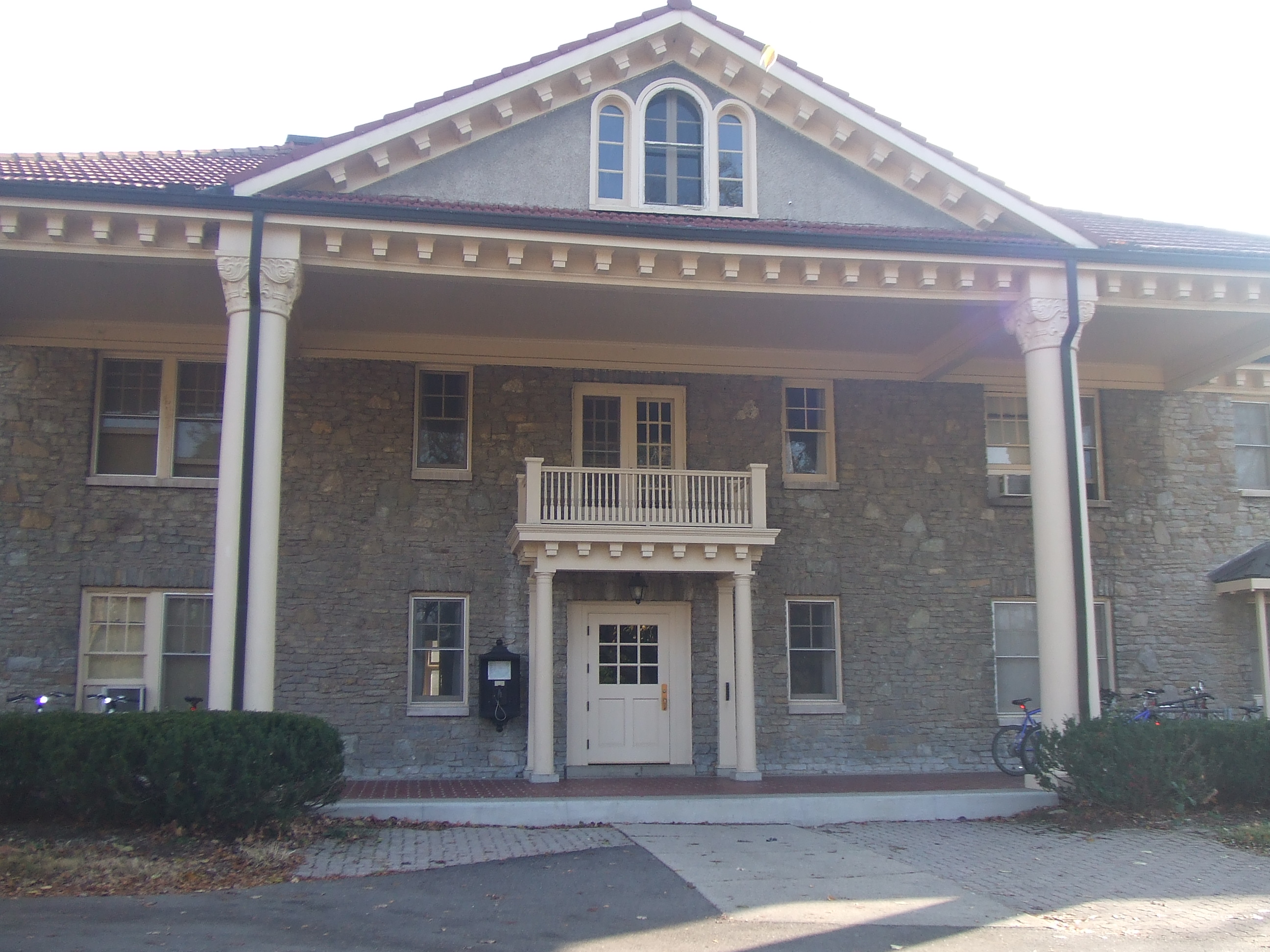
Front entrance to Wilson Hall

=== Namesake ===
The building was used for dorms and training facilities under the name The Pines until 1986, when Miami renamed the building Wilson Hall after Dr. Charles Wilson, a Miami alumnus active for many years in campus governance.

=== Plans for demolition ===
In 2010, Miami's Physical Facilities department surveyed the university's 41 dormitories and designated the building "higher risk" due to its perceived nature as a fire hazard. The university's Campus Planning Committee approved the building's demolition in February 2019, and planned to replace the building with green space, noting that there was no need for dormitories with smaller capacities like Wilson due to the recent construction of larger, 4-story dormitories. Two students on the committee voiced concerns regarding Miami's perceived "underlying problem with demolishing old buildings," citing the demolition of two century-old dormitories over the last four years.
