= Johnston–Jacobs House =

Historic house in Kentucky, United States

- U.S. National Register of Historic Places
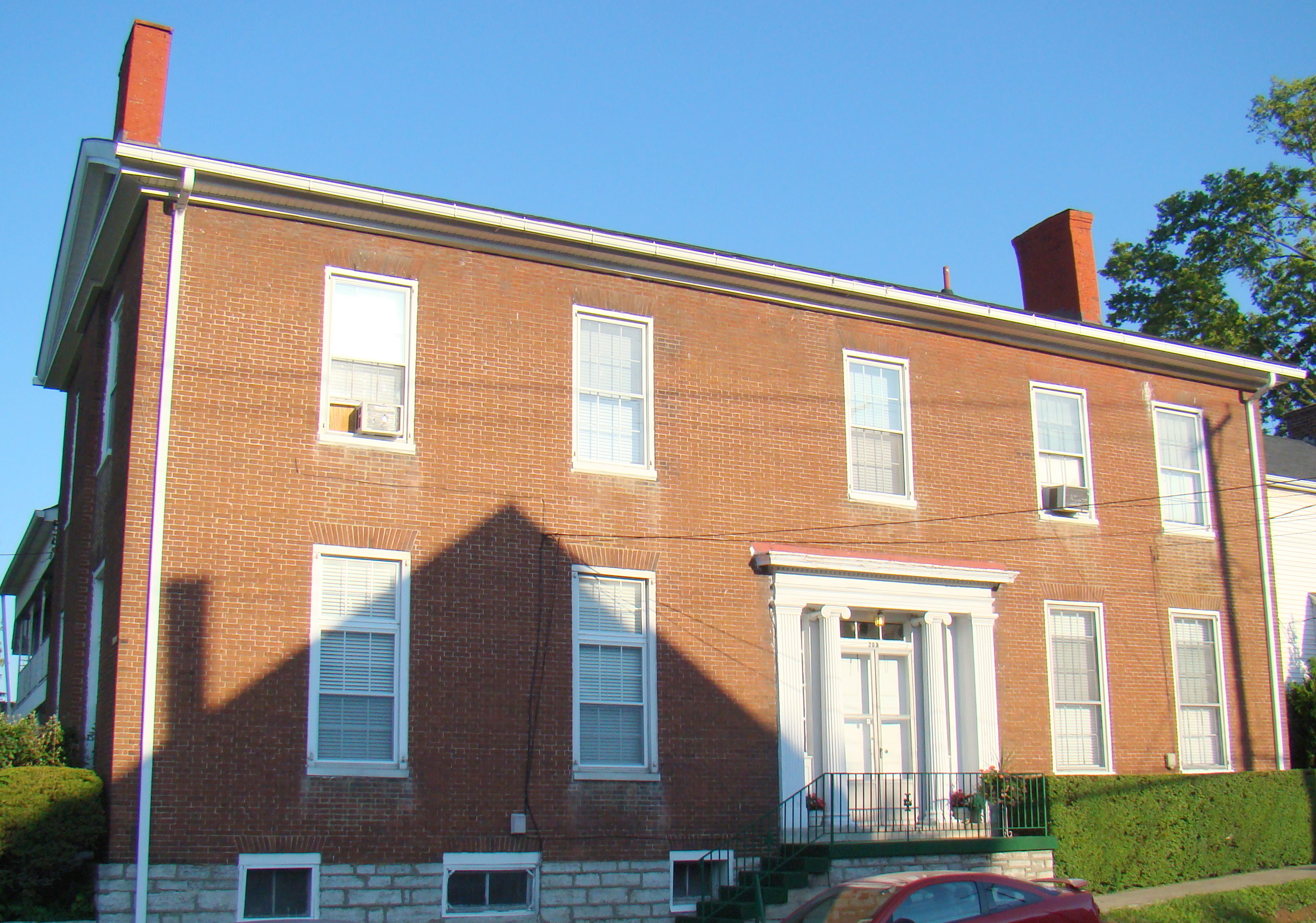
- Location: Georgetown, Kentucky
- Coordinates: 38°12′42″N 84°33′30″W
- Built: 1795
- Architectural style: Greek Revival
- NRHP reference No.: 73000838
- Added to NRHP: October 2, 1973

The Johnston–Jacobs House is a Greek Revival style brick house located near downtown Georgetown, Kentucky. The original structure was built in approximately 1795 by Adam Johnston for use as a tavern-inn. The property was added to the U.S. National Register of Historic Places on October 2, 1973.

== History ==
Adam Johnston and his son Thomas were among the first permanent settlers in Georgetown, Kentucky. Around 1795, Adam Johnston established an ordinary, which was a place where travelers could have lodging, meals, whiskey, and stable their horses. Adam Johnston died in 1810 and Thomas owned the building until 1830 when his daughter Mary Ann and her husband James M. Shelton acquired the property. William Jacobs, a blacksmith, bought the building and several pieces of property around it. In 1860, Nathan Payne purchased the house and renovated the structure with stylish Greek Revival additions. After Payne's death, the dwelling was sold J. C. Cravens, and soon resold to James Rawlins, and then Virginia W. Hamilton, wife of Dr. John A. Hamilton.
