= Andrew Crockett House =

Historic house in Tennessee, United States

- U.S. National Register of Historic Places
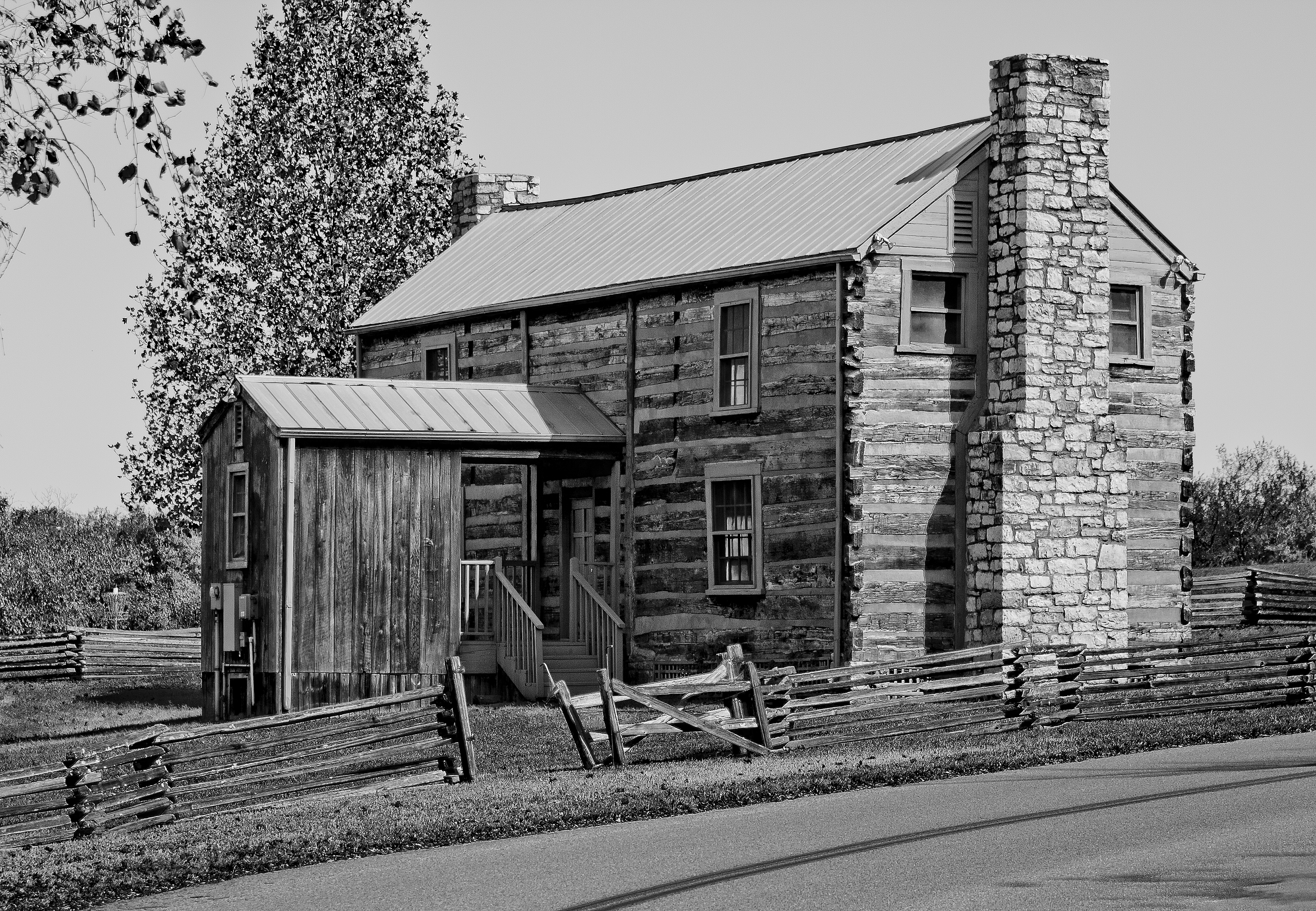

- Location within Tennessee Location within the United States
- Location: 8230 Wikle Ln., Brentwood, Tennessee
- Coordinates: 35°59′1″N 86°47′2″W
- Area: 1 acre (0.40 ha)
- Built: c.1800, 1821 and c.1847
- Architect: Andrew Crockett
- Architectural style: Greek Revival
- MPS: Williamson County MRA
- NRHP reference No.: 88000302
- Added to NRHP: April 13, 1988

The Andrew Crockett House, also known as the Crockett-Knox House, is a property in Brentwood, Tennessee, United States that was listed on the National Register of Historic Places (NRHP) in 1988.

It was built or has other significance in c. 1800, 1821, and c. 1847. The house was built by Andrew Crockett, an early settler. It includes Greek Revival architecture.

According to a 1988 study of Williamson County historical resources, the house was built by 1799 and was enlarged later (c. 1850). Crockett received the 640-acre (260 ha) land grant from North Carolina for his Revolutionary War services.

This house is one of five log buildings built during 1798 to 1800, during the earliest settling of the area, which survive to today. Others, also NRHP-listed, are: the William Ogilvie House, the David McEwen House, the Daniel McMahan House, and the William Boyd House.
