= Mary Park Wilson House =

Historic house in West Virginia, United States

- U.S. National Register of Historic Places
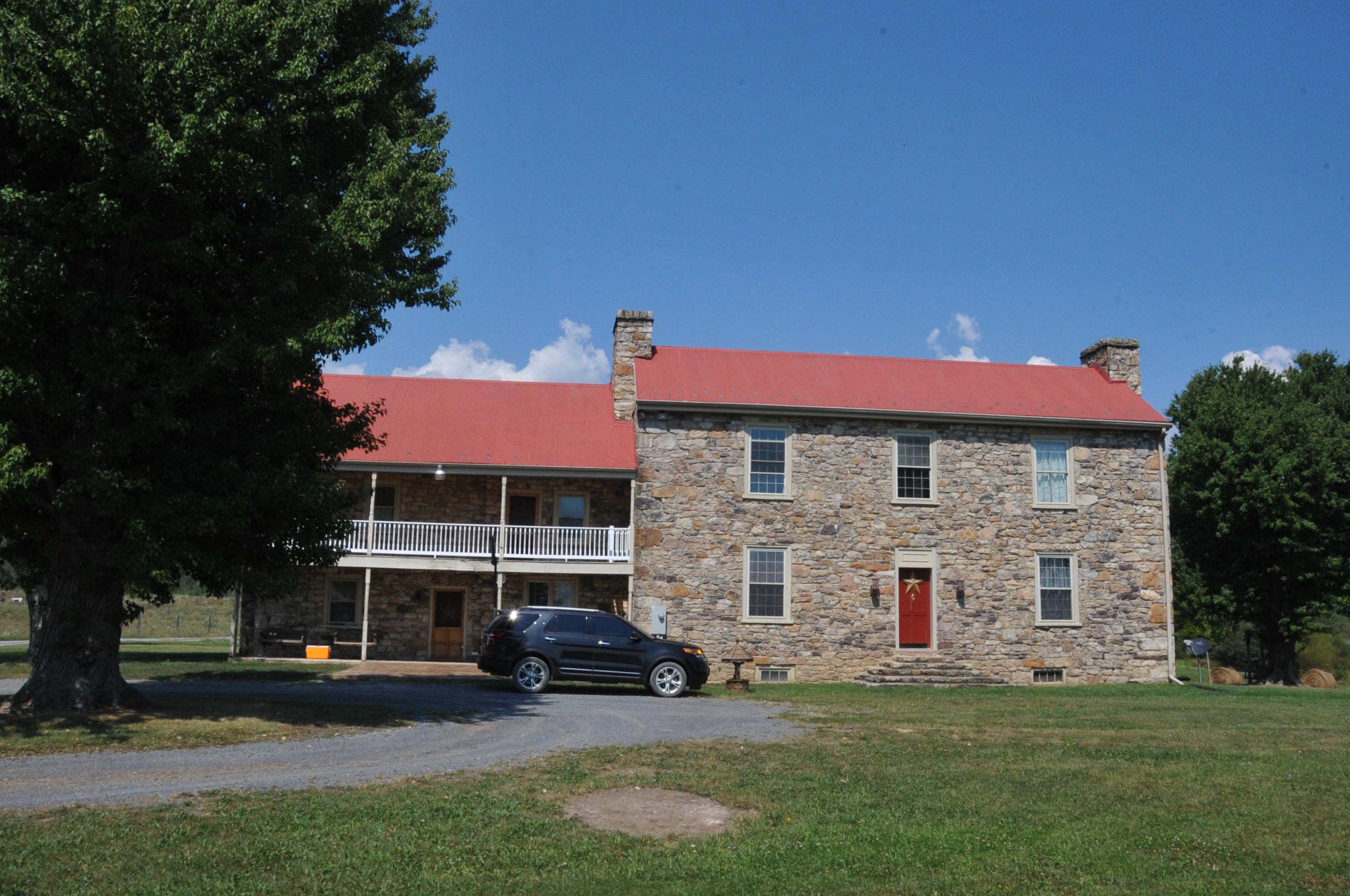
- 2009

- Location within West Virginia Location within the United States
- Location: Destiny Drive, near Gerrardstown, West Virginia
- Coordinates: 39°22′18″N 78°6′30″W
- Area: 1 acre (0.40 ha)
- Built: 1825
- Architect: Wilson, William
- Architectural style: Federal
- NRHP reference No.: 85001524
- Added to NRHP: July 8, 1985

Mary Park Wilson House, also known as "Old Stone House Farm" and "Oban Hall," is a historic home located near Gerrardstown, West Virginia, United States. It was built in 1825 by William Wilson for his wife Mary Park Wilson. The Federal style, rubble stone house has two sections: a three bay, two-story central block with a three-bay, two-story wing. The central block measures 52 feet wide by 21 feet deep. The wing features a two-story recessed porch. The property was purchased in 1952, by Archibald McDougall who named it "Oban Hall."

It was listed on the National Register of Historic Places in 1985.
