= Woodrow Wilson House =

Woodrow Wilson House may refer to:

- Woodrow Wilson Birthplace, Staunton, VA, listed on the NRHP in Virginia
- Woodrow Wilson Boyhood Home, Augusta, GA, listed on the NRHP in Georgia
- Woodrow Wilson House (Washington, D.C.), home after Wilson's presidency, a National Historic Landmark, and listed on the NRHP in Washington, D.C.
