= William Boyd House =

Historic house in Tennessee, United States

- U.S. National Register of Historic Places
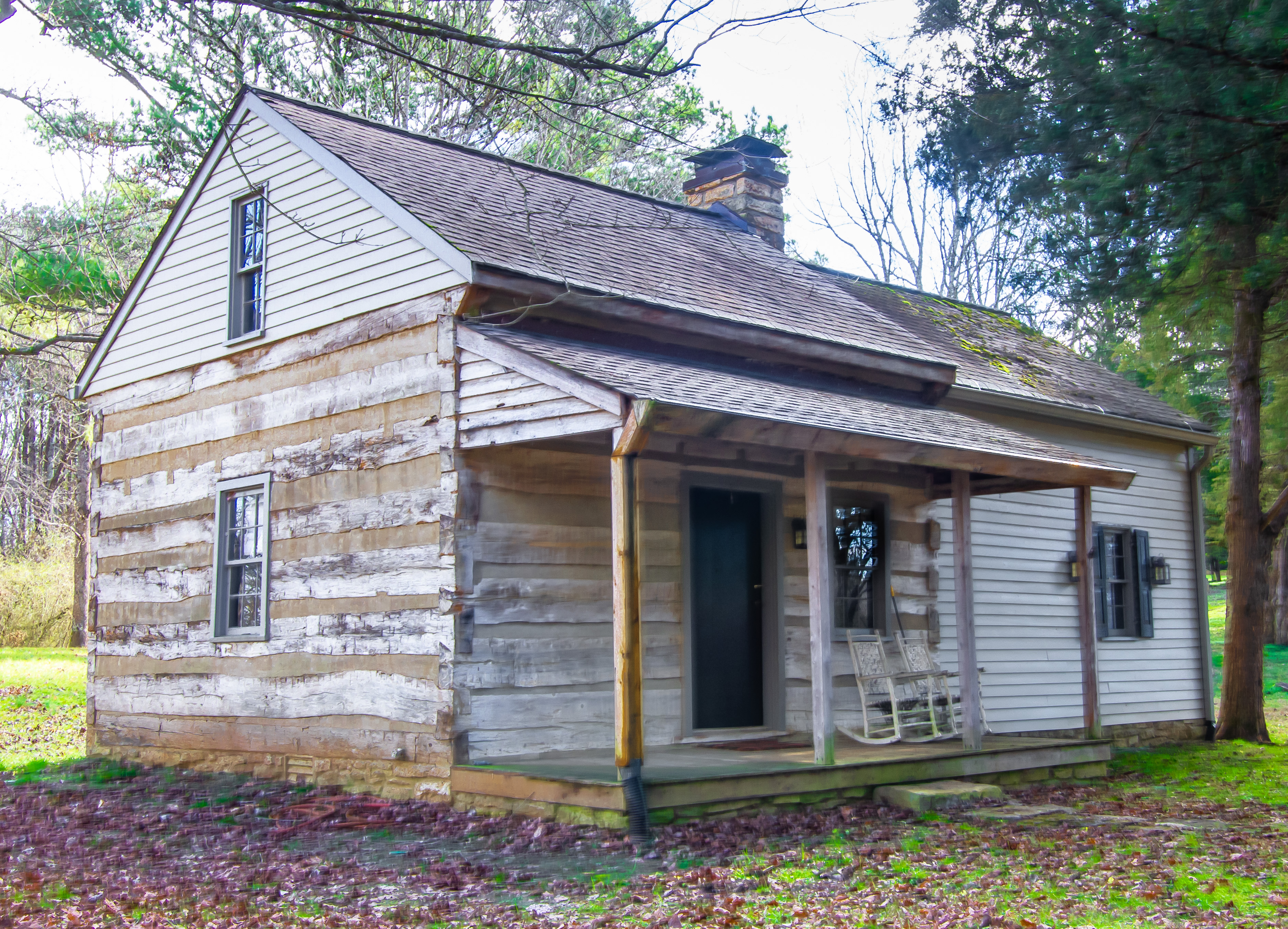

- Location within Tennessee Location within the United States
- Location: Boyd Mill Pike 1/10 mi. N of Boxley Valley Rd., Franklin, Tennessee
- Coordinates: 35°55′27″N 86°57′55″W
- Area: 1 acre (0.40 ha)
- Built: c. 1800
- Architectural style: Double pen
- MPS: Williamson County MRA
- NRHP reference No.: 88000284
- Added to NRHP: April 13, 1988

The William Boyd House, also known as All Bright Hill, is a c. 1800 double-pen house in Franklin, Tennessee, United States.

The W.A. Boyd farm was one of the largest farms or plantations in Williamson County both before and after the American Civil War. After the war, many of these were reduced in size, but the Boyd farm, which included the Boyd Mill and the William Boyd House had 528 acres (214 ha). The house was of log cabin type but was expanded with a two-story colonnade.

The house was listed on the National Register of Historic Places in 1988. When listed the property included one contributing building and one non-contributing structure on 1 acre (0.40 ha).

This house is one of five log buildings built during 1798 to 1800, during the earliest settling of the area, which survive to today. Others, also NRHP-listed, are: the William Ogilvie House, the David McEwen House, the Daniel McMahan House, and the Andrew Crockett House.

== See also ==
- Boyd-Wilson Farm
