= John E. Wilson House =

Historic house in North Carolina, United States

- U.S. National Register of Historic Places
- Location within North Carolina Location within the United States
- Location: SR 1631 at SR 1630, near Dunn, North Carolina
- Coordinates: 35°15′37″N 78°30′29″W
- Area: less than one acre
- Built: c. 1878
- Architectural style: Italianate, Italianate Victorian
- MPS: Sampson County MRA
- NRHP reference No.: 86000545
- Added to NRHP: March 17, 1986

John E. Wilson House is a historic home located near Dunn, Sampson County, North Carolina. It was built about 1878, and is a two-story, single pile, Italianate style frame dwelling with a rear ell. It has a center-false-gable roof and is sheathed in weatherboard. The front facade features an intricate double-tier porch. It was built as a boarding house for teachers and students in conjunction with Shady Grove School and has been moved twice, in 1975 and in 1984.

It was added to the National Register of Historic Places in 1986.
