= William T. E. Wilson Homestead =

Historic house in Oregon, United States

- U.S. National Register of Historic Places
- U.S. Historic district
- Nearest city: Sisters, Oregon
- Area: 160 acres (65 ha)
- Built: 1903
- Architectural style: American Foursquare
- NRHP reference No.: 98000205
- Added to NRHP: March 5, 1998

The William T. E. Wilson Homestead, located in Sisters, Oregon, is a house that is listed on the National Register of Historic Places.

== See also ==
- National Register of Historic Places listings in Deschutes County, Oregon
