= John Wilson House (De Soto, Iowa) =

Historic house in Iowa, United States

- U.S. National Register of Historic Places
- Location within Iowa Location within the United States
- Location: Southwest of De Soto, Iowa
- Coordinates: 41°30′30″N 94°05′33″W
- Area: 7 acres (2.8 ha)
- Built: 1861
- NRHP reference No.: 79000894
- Added to NRHP: March 30, 1979

The John Wilson House is a historic dwelling located southwest of De Soto, Iowa, United States. The house is an example of the second stage of house construction in Iowa. The first stage was generally log construction by the first settlers. This stage is marked by plain, stone structures. John Wilson was a part of a migration of Quakers from Indiana into Iowa beginning in the 1830s. Wilson and his family initially settled in Warren County in 1853. They then moved to Madison County, and then into southern Dallas County where he bought this land in 1854. Wilson built this two-story house of locally quarried limestone in 1861. It was listed on the National Register of Historic Places in 1979.
