= William Wilson House (Gerrardstown, West Virginia) =

Historic house in West Virginia, United States

- U.S. National Register of Historic Places
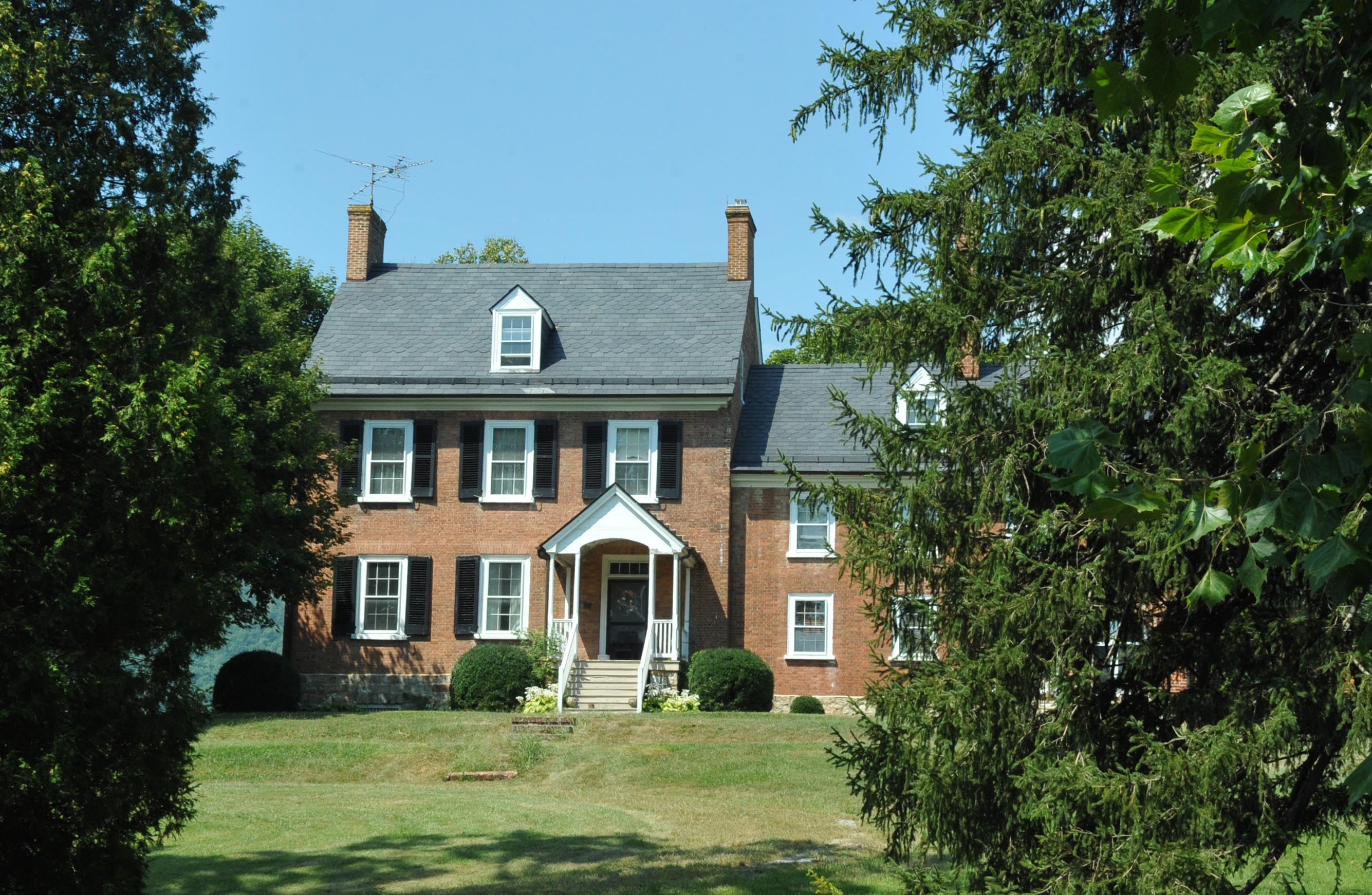
- House in 2015

- Location within West Virginia Location within the United States
- Location: WV 51, Gerrardstown, West Virginia
- Coordinates: 39°22′33″N 78°6′20″W
- Built: 1792
- Architect: Wilson, William
- Architectural style: Georgian
- NRHP reference No.: 84003508
- Added to NRHP: January 12, 1984

William Wilson House, also known as Prospect Hill and the Trammell Hollis House, is a historic home located in Gerrardstown, Berkeley County, West Virginia. It was built between 1792 and 1802, and is a large, two story brick dwelling on a stone foundation in a late-Georgian style. It measures 36 feet 6 inches (11.13 m) deep and 70 feet (21 m) wide and consists of a three-bay central block with a four-bay side wing. The interior features a mural by Baltimore artist Olive Verna Rogers painted in 1936. The property includes four brick outbuildings dated as far back as the 1850s: a kitchen, spring house, privy, and the original stone dwelling house.

The house was listed on the National Register of Historic Places in 1984.

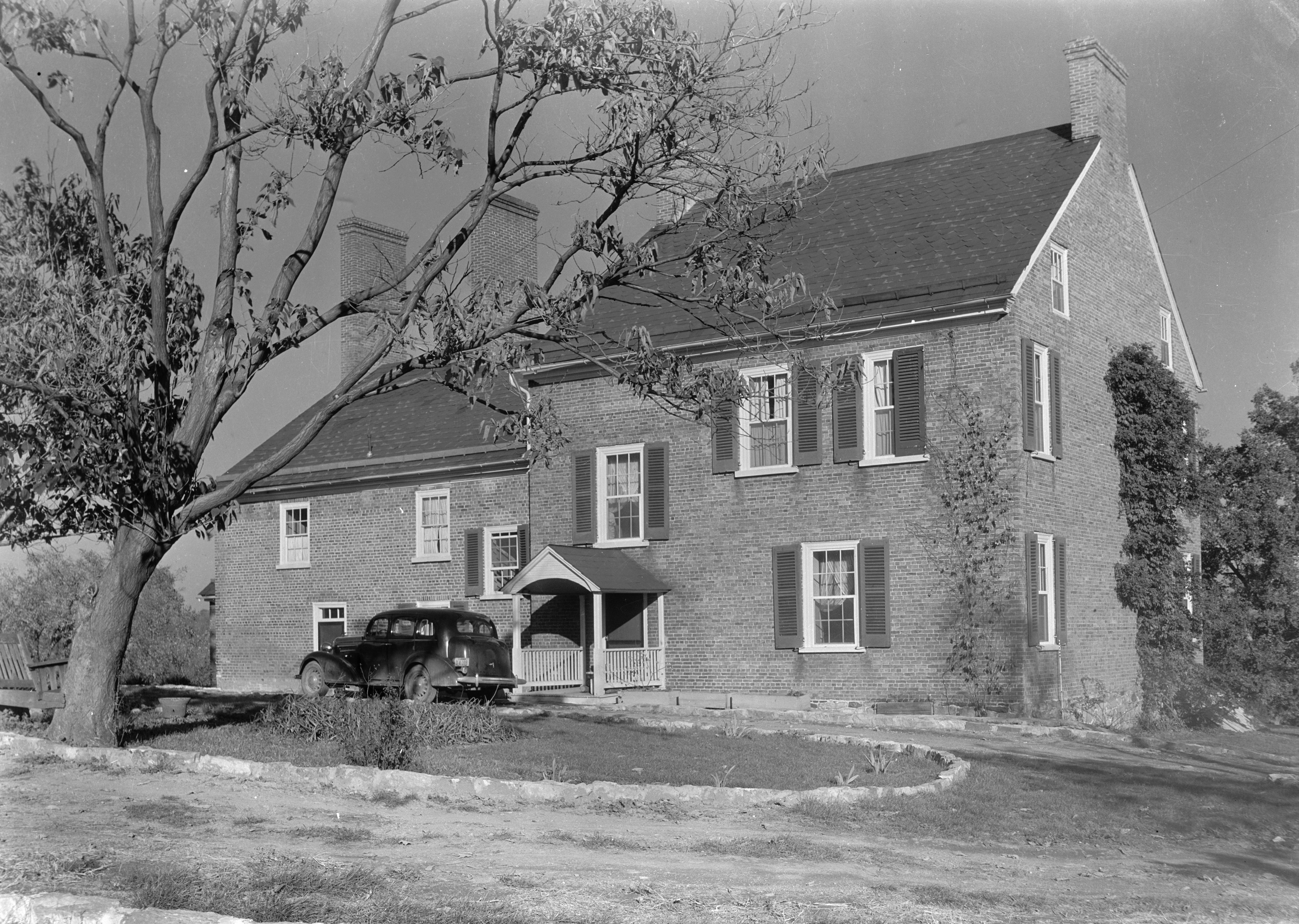
Trammell Hollis House from HABS

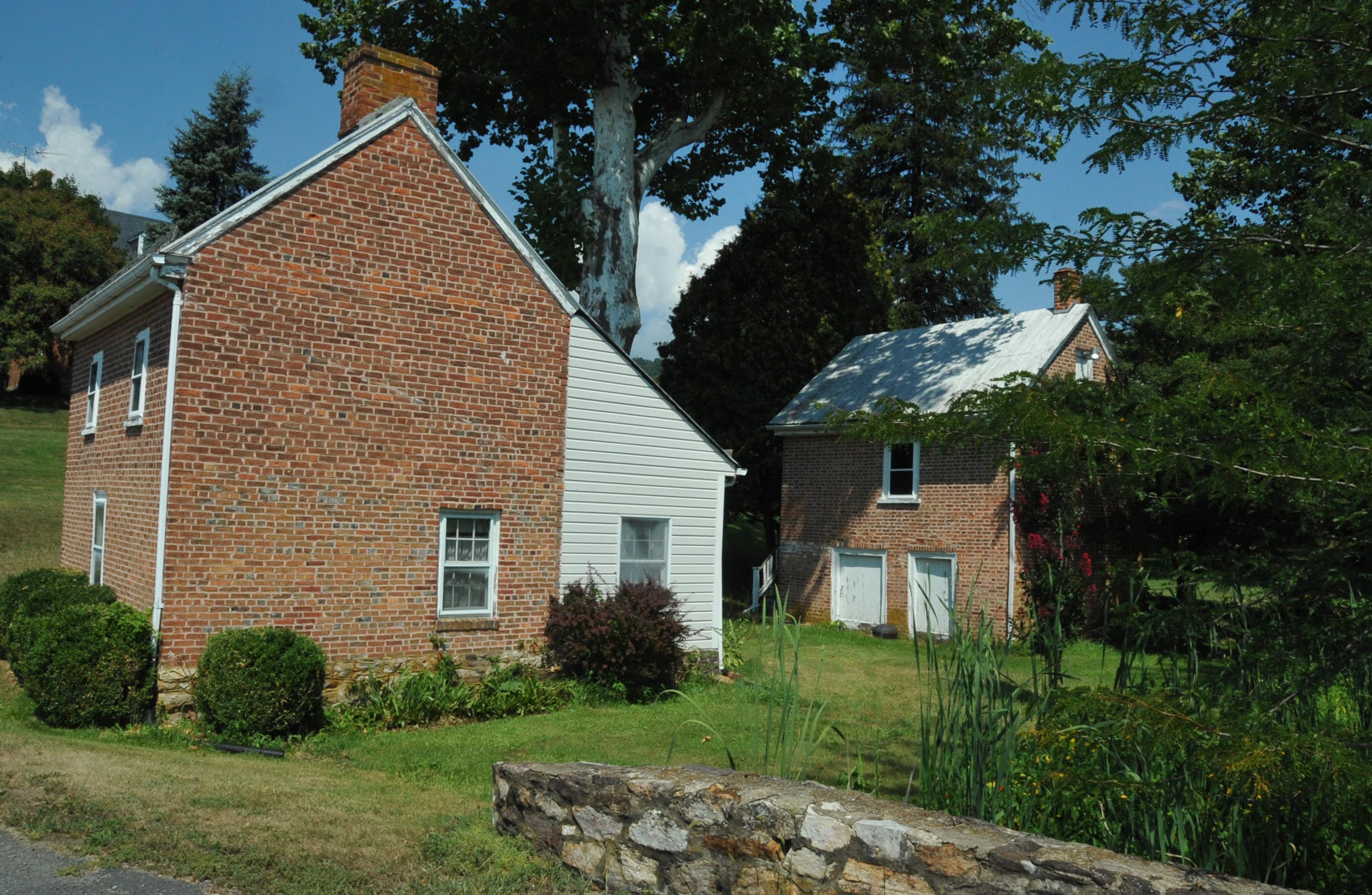
Former slave quarters

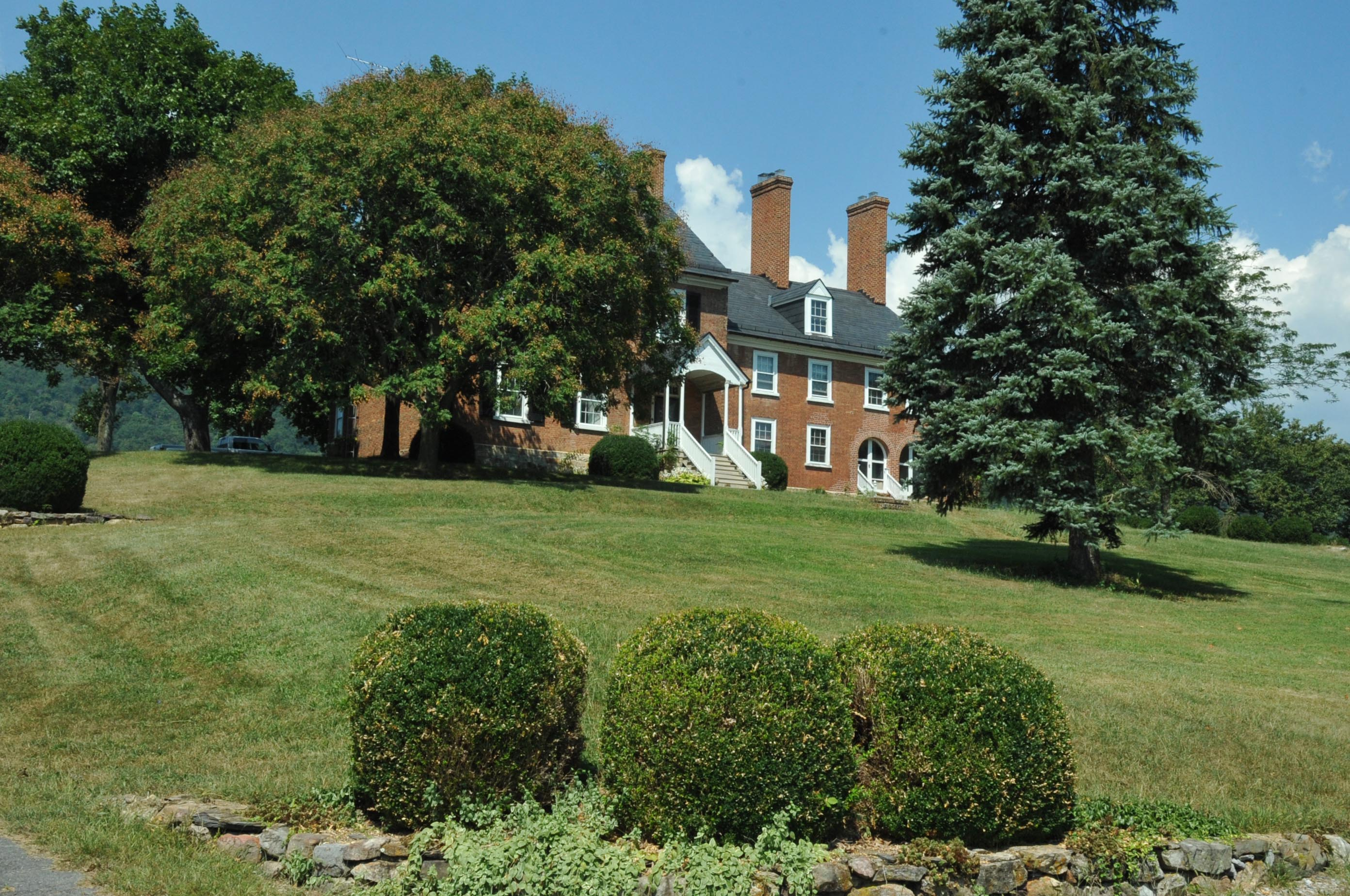
2015

== See also ==
- Mary Park Wilson House
