= William J. Wilson House =

Historic house in North Carolina, United States

- U.S. National Register of Historic Places
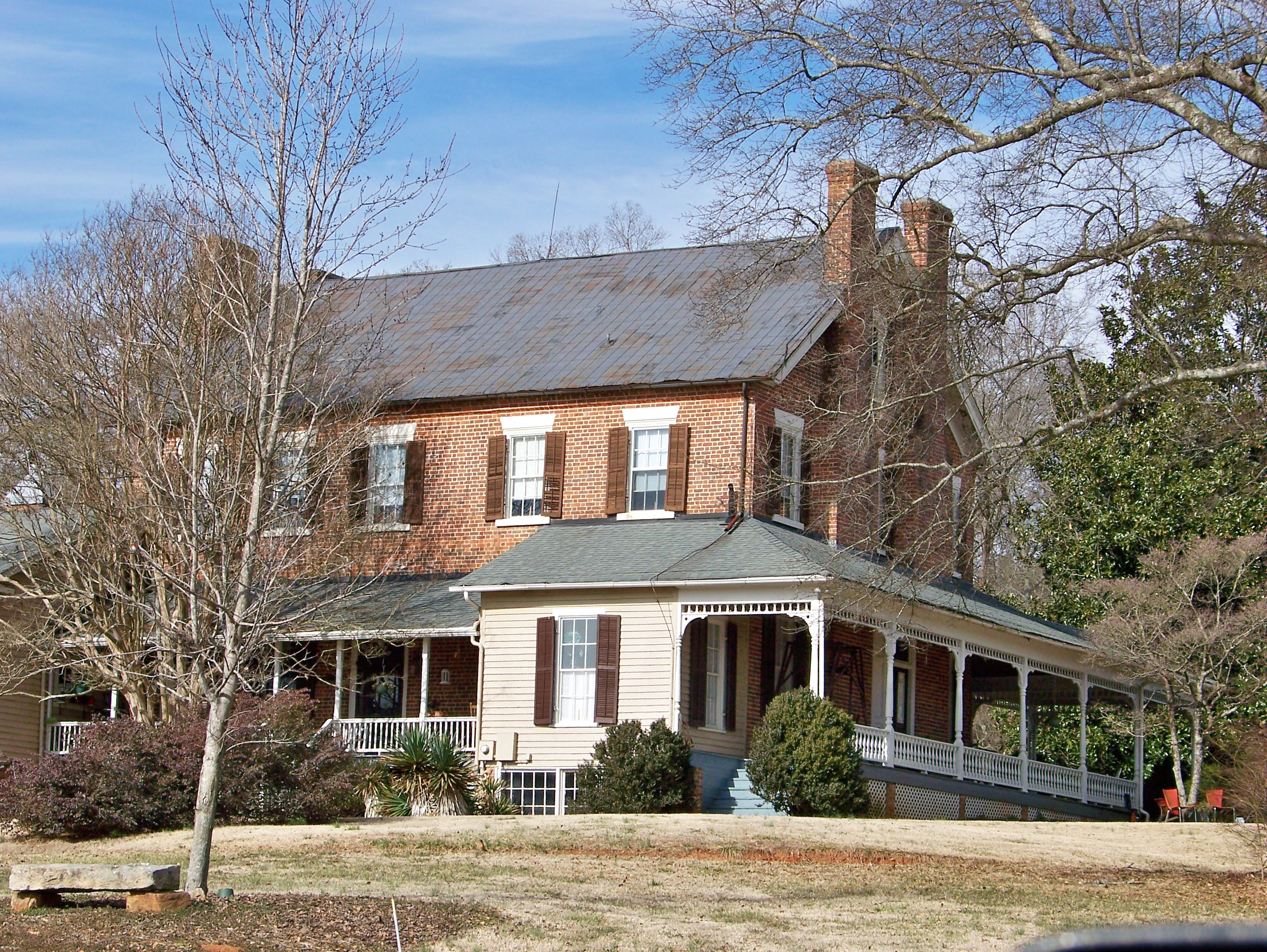

- Location within North Carolina Location within the United States
- Location: South of Gastonia off SR 1109, near Gastonia, North Carolina
- Coordinates: 35°9′50″N 81°13′13″W
- Area: 5 acres (2.0 ha)
- Built: c. 1824
- Architectural style: Late Victorian, Federal
- NRHP reference No.: 76001324
- Added to NRHP: October 14, 1976

William J. Wilson House is a historic home located near Gastonia, Gaston County, North Carolina. It was built about 1824, and is a two-story, five-bay, Federal-style brick dwelling. Its brickwork is laid in Flemish bond. It has a side-gable roof and exterior brick end chimneys. It features a one-story, Late Victorian porch with porte cochere.

It was listed on the National Register of Historic Places in 1976.
