= John Calvin Wilson House =

Historic house in South Carolina, United States

- U.S. National Register of Historic Places
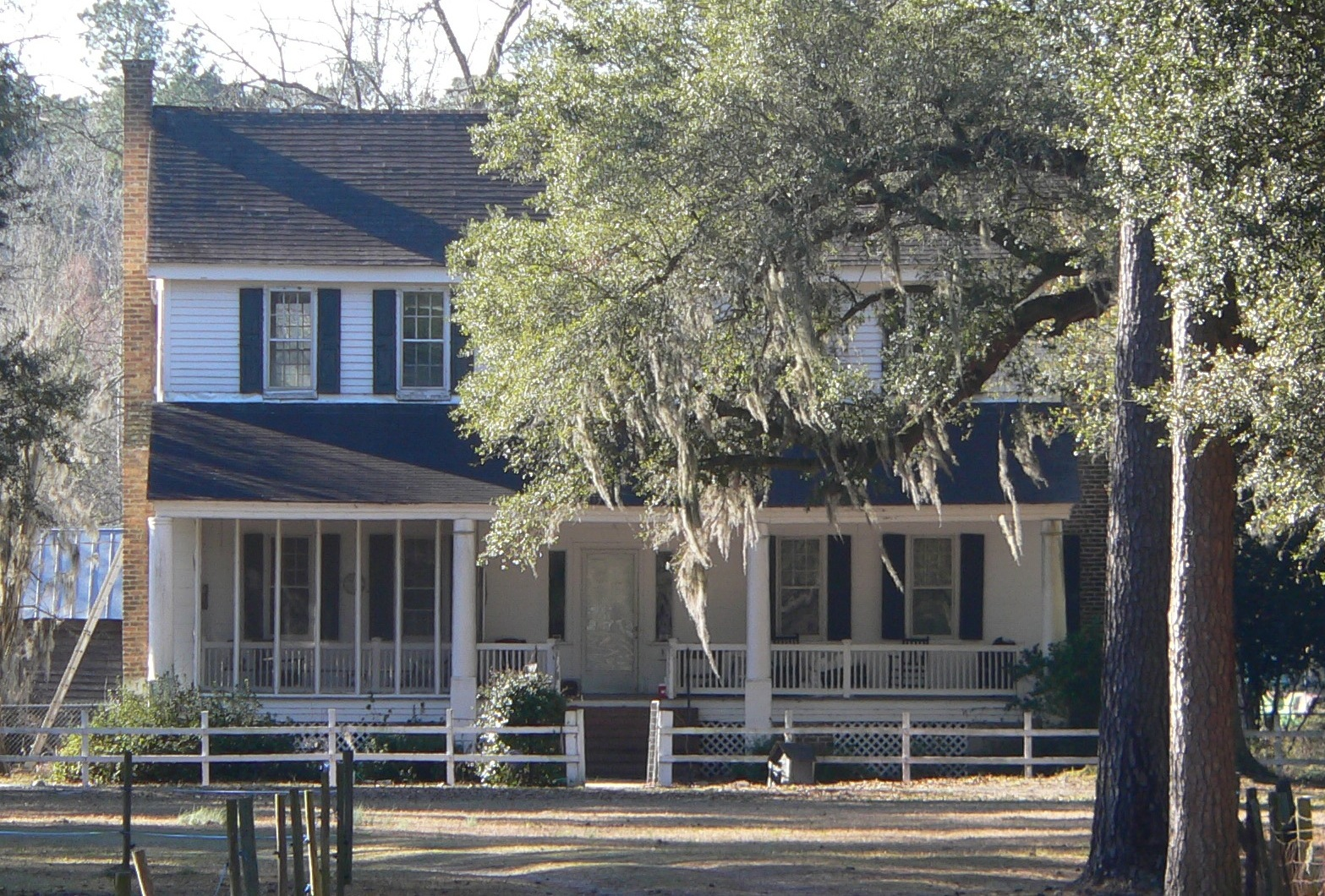
- John Calvin Wilson house, January 2013

- Location within South Carolina Location within the United States
- Location: South Carolina Highway 512, 3.7 miles northwest of its junction with SC Hwy 261, near Indiantown, South Carolina
- Coordinates: 33°45′10″N 79°39′31″W
- Area: 4.2 acres (1.7 ha)
- Built: c. 1847
- NRHP reference No.: 82003905
- Added to NRHP: June 28, 1982

John Calvin Wilson House is a historic home located near Indiantown, Williamsburg County, South Carolina. It was built about 1847, and is a two-story, five-bay, frame central-hall plan I-house. It features a shed roofed, one-story "Carolina" or "rain porch" supported by four stuccoed brick columns. A one-story frame rear wing was added in 1939. John Calvin Wilson was a politician and a successful planter. He died at Richmond, Virginia of complications from a thigh wound sustained in the Battle of Cold Harbor.

It was listed on the National Register of Historic Places in 1982.
