= Wilson Hall (Bucksport, Maine) =

- U.S. National Register of Historic Places
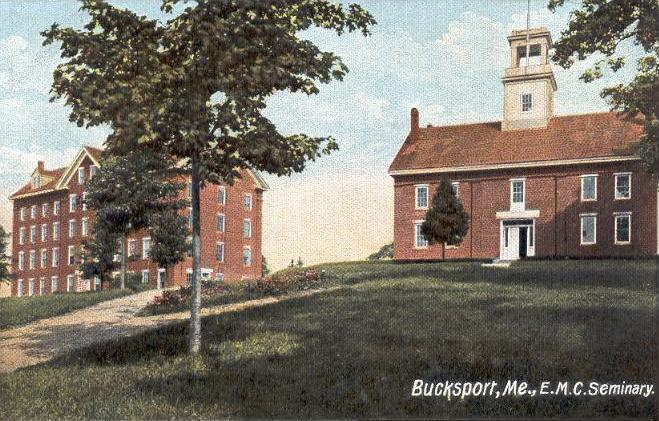

- Location within Maine Location within the United States
- Location: Franklin St., Bucksport, Maine
- Coordinates: 44°34′31″N 68°47′51″W
- Area: 0.5 acres (0.20 ha)
- Built: 1850
- Architectural style: Greek Revival
- NRHP reference No.: 83000452
- Added to NRHP: April 27, 1983

Wilson Hall is a historic Methodist seminary building on Franklin Street in Bucksport, Maine. Built in 1850-51 by the Eastern Maine Methodist Conference, it housed East Maine Conference Seminary, which was the only Methodist seminary in eastern Maine, and was the only seminary in Hancock County. Of the two surviving buildings of the seminary, this is the finest, a handsome Greek Revival structure that is a distinctive local landmark. The building was listed on the National Register of Historic Places in 1983.

== Description and history ==
Wilson Hall is set on the north side of Franklin Street on the outskirts of Bucksport village, just west of a cemetery fronting on McDonald Street. It sits atop a rise that would have a commanding view of the village if a band of trees did not intervene. The building is a two-story gable-roofed structure, with load-bearing brick walls two stories high, and wood frame gable ends and roof structure. A two-stage square belfry rises at the center of the roof ridge, and the main entrance is centered on the long side, facing toward the village to the south. A shed-roof dormer has been added to the north side of the roof. On the same property further west stands the seminary's original 1855 dormitory, which has been significantly altered and is no longer historically significant.

The Eastern Maine Methodist Conference was established in 1848, due in part to the rise in Methodism's popularity in the region in the 1840s. The conference elected to build a seminary soon afterward, and Wilson Hall was built in 1850-51. It is the largest Greek Revival building in Bucksport, and was home to the county's only seminary. The school closed in 1933. In 1941 the property was purchased by an order Roman Catholic Oblate Fathers, who operated St. Joseph's Seminary on the premises until 1971. The property was sold to a private owner in 1978. After standing vacant and deteriorating for many years, the building is now owned by the town and is the subject of preservation efforts.

== See also ==
- National Register of Historic Places listings in Hancock County, Maine
