= Jacobs–Wilson House =

Historic building in Portland, Oregon, U.S.

- U.S. National Register of Historic Places
- Portland Historic Landmark
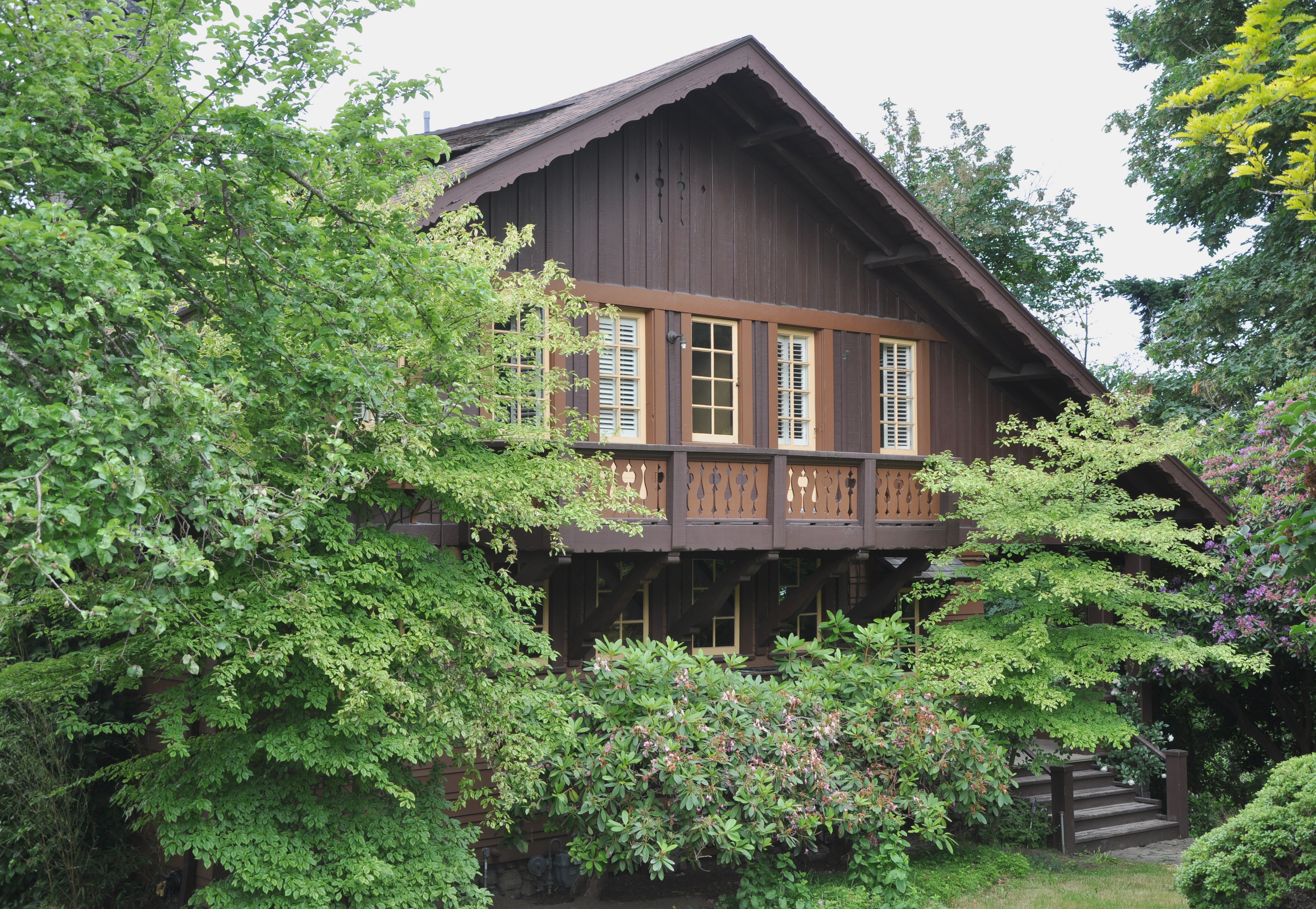
- Jacobs–Wilson House in 2011

- Location within Oregon Location within the United States
- Location: 6461 SE Thorburn Street, Portland, Oregon
- Coordinates: 45°31′15″N 122°35′51″W
- Area: 0.6 acres (0.24 ha)
- Built: 1913
- Architectural style: Swiss Chalet
- NRHP reference No.: 81000516
- Added to NRHP: December 10, 1981

The Jacobs–Wilson House, also known as Tabor Swiss Chalet, is a Swiss Chalet-style house in Portland, Oregon that was listed on the National Register of Historic Places in 1981.

Built in 1913, it is a two-and-a-half-story wood-frame house built on a native stone foundation. It was the first house built on Thorburn Avenue, on the west slope of Mt. Tabor, in an area which eventually developed into a fine residential neighborhood. It has an expansive view across the valley of the Willamette River to Portland's west hills.

The house is said to have been built to plans from Switzerland, and to have met a request of Bolina Jacobs to her son Frederick Alva Jacobs.

== See also ==
- National Register of Historic Places listings in Southeast Portland, Oregon
