= John Wilson House (Jewett City, Connecticut) =

Historic house in Connecticut, United States

- U.S. National Register of Historic Places
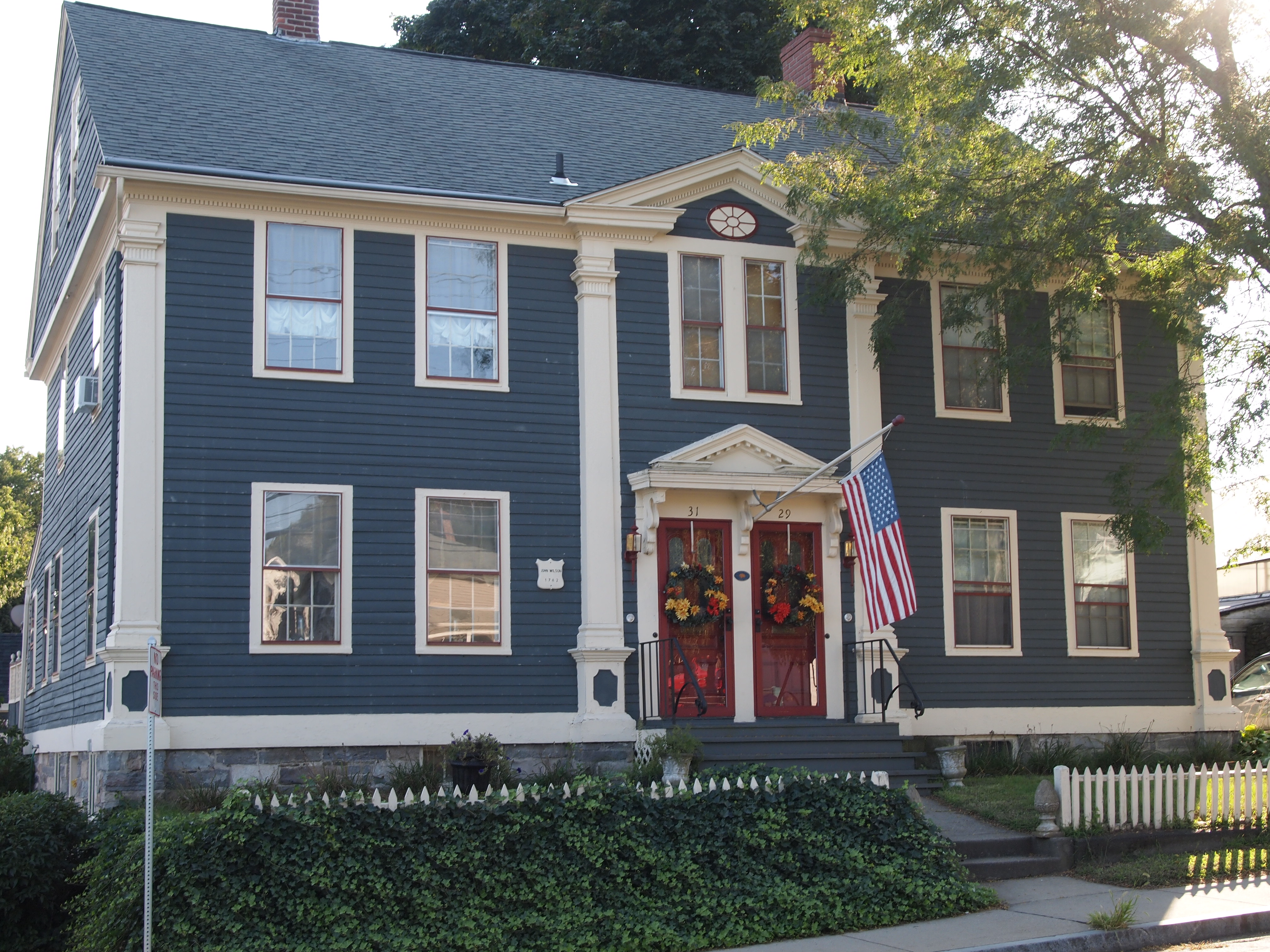

- Location within Connecticut Location within the United States
- Location: 29-31 Ashland Street, Jewett City, Connecticut
- Coordinates: 41°36′21″N 71°58′50″W
- Area: less than one acre
- Built: 1781
- Architectural style: Georgian
- NRHP reference No.: 85001827
- Added to NRHP: August 23, 1985

The John Wilson House is a historic house at 29–31 Ashland Street in the borough of Jewett City in the town of Griswold, Connecticut. Built about 1781, it is significant locally as a fine example of Georgian residential architecture, and as the home of John Wilson, a leading local industrialist of the late 18th century. The house was listed on the National Register of Historic Places in 1985.

== Description and history ==
The John Wilson House is located in the village of Jewett City, on the south side of Ashland Street at its junction with Hill Street. It is a 2 1/2-story wood-frame structure, five bays wide, with a side-gable roof, two chimneys, and clapboard siding. Its main facade has a slightly projecting center section, marked by two-story pilasters, a detail repeated at the building corners. A pair of doors are topped by an open gable pediment with heavy brackets. The interior has been altered in some significant ways to facilitate conversion to a duplex, including the removal of its original central chimney.

The house was built c. 1781–82 by John Wilson, an early settler of Jewett City who married the daughter of Eliezer Jewett. Wilson was a significant early industrialist in Jewett City, establishing a fulling mill in 1790 and incorporating the Jewett City Cotton Manufacturing Company in 1815. His house, originally a center-chimney plan, was originally located up the street at the corner of Main and Ashland Streets. It was moved a short distance in the 1860s by Alfred Young, the agent for the Slater Mills, then the area's largest mill. It is the only surviving house associated with either man.

== See also ==
- National Register of Historic Places listings in New London County, Connecticut
