= Gould House =

Gould House may refer to:

- Trulock-Gould-Mullis House, Pine Bluff, Arkansas, listed on the NRHP in Jefferson County, Arkansas
- Gould-Shaw House, Cloverdale, CA, listed on the NRHP in Sonoma County, California
- Thomas Gould, Jr., House, Ventura, California, listed on the NRHP in Ventura County, California
- Gould House (Norfolk, Connecticut), listed on the NRHP in Litchfield County, Connecticut
- Gould-Weed House, Augusta, Georgia, listed on the NRHP in Richmond County, Georgia
- Gould House (Skowhegan, Maine), listed on the NRHP in Somerset County, Maine
- Capt. Joseph Gould House, Topsfield, Massachusetts, listed on the NRHP in Essex County, Massachusetts
- Zaccheus Gould House, Topsfield, Massachusetts, listed on the NRHP in Essex County, Massachusetts
- Samuel Gould House, Wakefield, Massachusetts, listed on the NRHP in Middlesex County, Massachusetts
- Amos Gould House, Owosso, Michigan, listed on the NRHP in Shiawassee County, Michigan
- Ebenezer Gould House, Owosso, Michigan, listed on the NRHP in Shiawassee County, Michigan
- Daniel Gould House, Owosso, Michigan, listed on the NRHP in Shiawassee County, Michigan
- Gould Mansion Complex, Lyons Falls, New York, listed on the NRHP in Lewis County, New York
- Gould-Guggenheim Estate, Port Washington, New York, listed on the NRHP in Nassau County, New York
- Gould House/Greater Parkersburg Chamber of Commerce, Parkersburg, WV, listed on the NRHP in Wood County, West Virginia
