= Food safety in the United States =

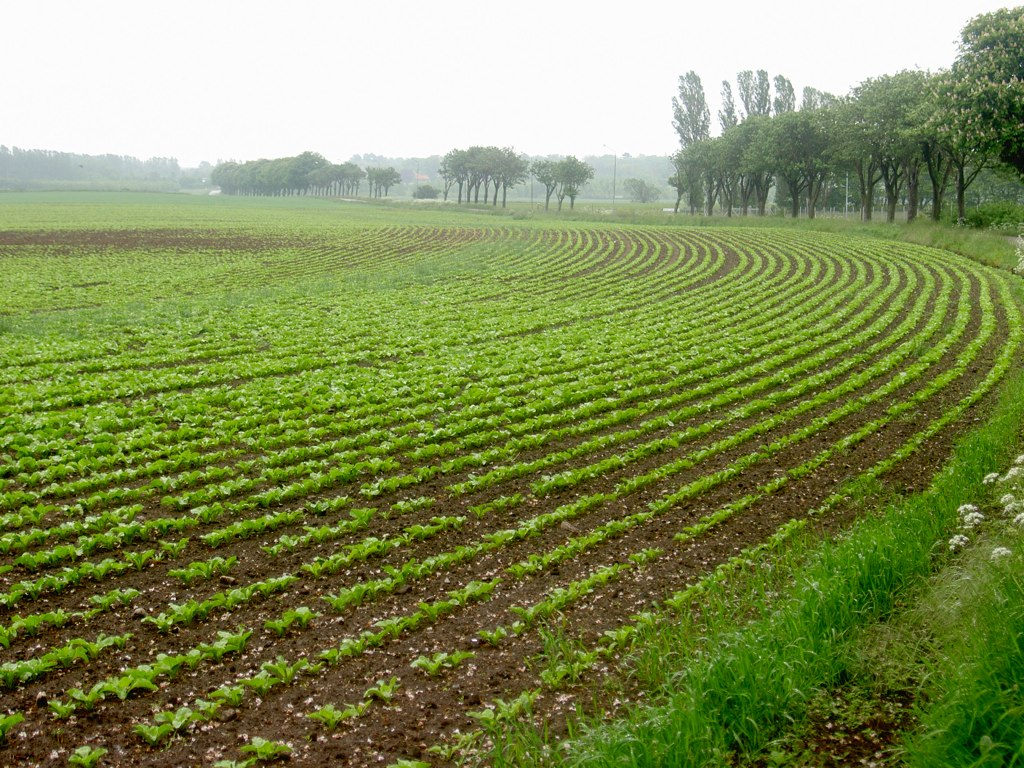
Food is regulated in the United States in order for consumers to eat healthy, safe food.

Food safety in the United States relates to the processing, packaging, and storage of food in a way that prevents food-borne illness within the United States. The beginning of regulation on food safety in the United States started in the early 1900s, when several outbreaks sparked the need for legislation managing food in the food industry. Over the next few decades, the United States created several government agencies in an effort to better understand contaminants in food and to regulate these impurities. Many laws regarding food safety in the United States have been created and amended since the beginning of the 1900s. Food makers and their products are inspected and regulated by the Food and Drug Administration and the Department of Agriculture.

The United States has recently taken food safety into consideration again after several deadly outbreaks occurred in the early 2000s. Incidents such as the E.coli contaminated spinach in 2006 bring attention to the regulation surrounding the food industry and food quality control. Many outbreaks have occurred because of loose enforcement of regulation and lack of quality testing of every batch of food that is being produced. Most legislation regarding food safety is in the wake of a deadly outbreak of a food-borne illness. The bacteria and viruses that cause most of the food-borne illnesses are Salmonella, E. coli, Listeria, norovirus, Campylobacter, and Clostridium perfringens. These can lead to some deadly diseases that have killed many people in the United States.

== Overview ==
Food safety in the United States is necessary in order to prevent and properly report food-borne illnesses. In 2011, a total of 9.4 million incidents of food-borne illness occurred in the United States. When legislation to prevent food-borne illnesses do not exist, widespread food-borne outbreaks typically spark legislation.

Informing consumers of the proper ingredients in food helps avoid widespread food-borne illness.

Prior to 1906, there were no laws related to food and intentional additives and unintentional contaminants added to food. Laws prior tends to focus strictly on the prohibition of selling food from compromised sources, like the selling of meat from diseased or rotting animal corpse. The Jungle, a novel published by Upton Sinclair in 1905, described the horrible working conditions in the meat-packing industry. His detailed account of the low quality of meat caused outrage among the public.

In 1906, two acts were signed into law following the aftermath of the accounts of lack of food quality: the Pure Food and Drug Act and the Federal Meat Inspection Act. The Pure Food and Drug Act forced food manufacturers to only sell unadulterated foods and to correctly label foods. The Meat Inspection Act lead to the creation of the US Department of Agriculture's Food Safety and Inspection Service, which manages the production of meat, poultry, and eggs, enforcing regulated limits of certain contaminants and enforcing quality of product. These laws have become a foundation for food safety in the United States and have set a precedent in regulating food. Since these two acts were signed, amendments and changes have taken place, but upon the framework set by the Pure Food and Drug Act and the Meat Inspection Act. These acts allowed U.S. court case called U.S. vs. 95 Barrels Alleged Apple Cider Vinegar to rule that the apple cider vinegar in question was misbranded as it was made from dried apples instead of fresh apples.

Recent legislation regarding food safety includes the Food Safety Modernization Act (FSMA), signed into law on January 4, 2011, by Barack Obama. This sweeping reform of food safety law shifted the FDA's focus from responding to contamination to preventing it. The FDA was tasked with strengthening regulations regarding produce safety, as well as regulations with increased preventative control measures in facilities that process food. FSMA's Produce Safety Rule (PSR), which went into effect on January 26, 2016, and is now being rolled out and implemented in different states, establishes minimum standards for the safe growing, harvesting, packing, and holding of fruits and vegetables grown for human consumption.

== Government agencies ==
The United States has three federal and two state governmental organizations that are in control of food safety within the United States: the Food and Drug Administration (FDA), the Food Safety and Inspection Service (FSIS), the Center for Disease Control and Prevention (CDC), the State Department of Public Health, and the State Department of Agriculture. These organizations focus on the production and distribution of food, making sure all food distributed to retail stores, restaurants, and consumers is safe, without contamination from food-borne illness. While there are many other smaller organizations that participate in the distribution of safe food, these organizations are the most active in regulating food and preventing food-borne illness in the United States.

=== Food and Drug Administration ===
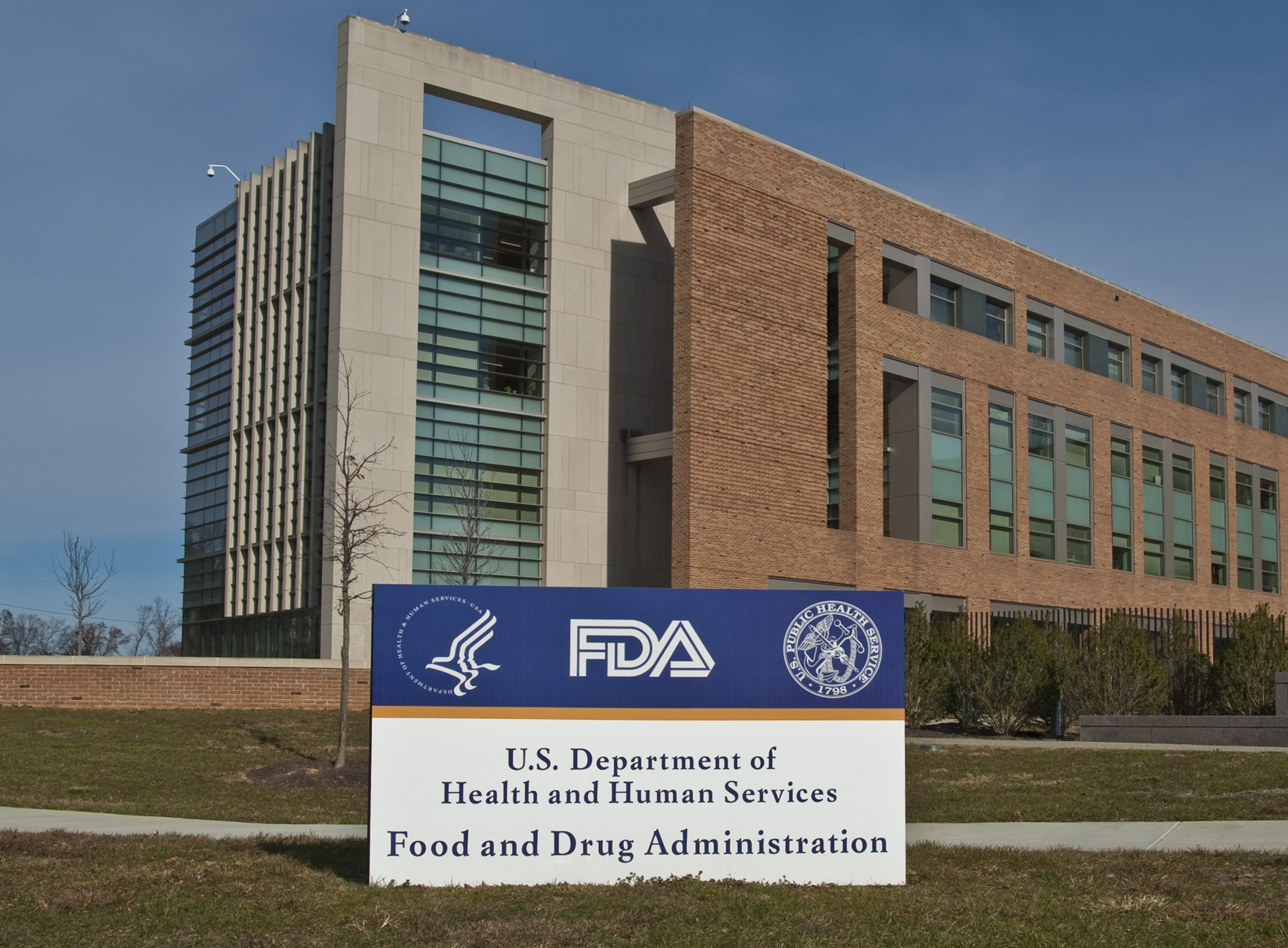
The FDA helps regulate contaminants in all types of food.

In 1862, the government division called the Bureau of Chemistry was created. The Bureau of Chemistry separated into two divisions in 1927, one of which was called the Food and Drug Administration (FDA). As a new organization, the FDA had little legal control when enforcing the few regulatory food safety laws. However, an incident in the late 1930s improved the FDA's control over food and drugs.

In the 1930s, a new antibacterial drug called sulfanilamide was synthesized and was widely accepted. One chemist at S.E. Massengill Co. in Bristol, Tennessee wanted to come up with a way to liquify the insoluble drug so children and adults could take the drug in liquid form. Diethylene glycol (DEG) was used to dissolve the drug, even though DEG is deadly to humans. Without any toxicologic testing, 1300 bottles of this "Elixir Sulfanilamide" were distributed to consumers and physicians. As soon as people starting dying after taking the elixir, the drug was recalled. The FDA investigated the company and found no clinical trials and no evidence of further testing involve the elixir.

At this time the FDA had no authority to penalize the company in question. Charges against the owner were filled, and six months later, a law called the Food, Drug, and Cosmetic Act of 1938 was signed. This law forced all new food, drugs, and cosmetics to be certified by the FDA before being put on the market. This act granted the FDA with enforcing and legal power that has helped regulate food and drugs ever since.

As of 2018, the FDA regulates more than $2.5 trillion in consumer food, medical products, and tobacco in the United States. The head of the FDA has the position of Commissioner of the FDA. The FDA is currently in the government branch of the United States Secretary of Health and Human Services.

=== Food Safety and Inspection Service ===
The 25 percent of food that the FDA does not regulate is monitored instead by the Food Safety and Inspection Service (FSIS) and includes all egg, meat, and poultry products processed and distributed in the United States. FSIS was founded upon the creation of the Federal Meat Inspection Act of 1906, the Poultry Products Inspection Act of 1957, and the Egg Products Inspection Act of 1970, along with several amendments to these acts that have been passed. FSIS enforces safe, wholesome, correctly-labeled egg, poultry, and meat products in every state in the United States including Puerto Rico. Currently, FSIS is an agency in the United States Department of Agriculture.

The Centers for Disease Control and Prevention (CDC) helps target public health issues including food-borne illnesses caused by contaminated food.

=== Centers for Disease Control and Prevention ===
In 1948, the Malaria Control in War Areas, a program run by the U.S. Public Health Service, was turned into the Communicable Disease Center (CDC). On July 1, the CDC was established in Atlanta, Georgia. One of the CDC's initial goals was to eradicate malaria from the United States entirely, which it successfully accomplished in 1951. When polio starting spreading in the 1950s, the CDC started to develop surveillance methods to keep track and record incidents of polio to help fight the spread of the paralytic and deadly virus. By the 1970s, less than 10 people had contracted polio in the United States. In the 1970s, when the CDC's name changed to the Center for Disease Control (CDC), the organization continued to advocate for other diseases and urgent public health issues. In 2016, when the Zika virus spread to the United States, the CDC immediately mobilized their Emergency Operations Center and took appropriate action. The main goal of the CDC is to keep track of health, safety, and security threats to the American people.

== Legislation ==
Before 1906, there were no laws concerning food safety and regulating how food is produced, manufactured, and distributed. Laws are typically written in the wake of severe outbreaks, rather than as a preventative measure. The current food safety laws are enforced by the FDA and FSIS. The FDA regulates all food manufactured in the United States, with the exception of the meat, poultry, and egg products that are regulated by FSIS. The following is a list of all food safety acts, amendments, and laws put into place in the United States.

=== 1900–1950 ===
1906: Pure Food and Drugs Act

1906: Federal Meat Inspection Act

1913: Gould Amendment

1930: McNary-Mapes Amendment

1938: Federal Food, Drug, and Cosmetic Act

1948: Miller Amendment

=== 1951–2000 ===
1953: Factory Inspection Amendment

1954: Miller Pesticide Amendment

1957: Poultry Products Inspection Act

1958: Food Additives Amendment

1960: Color Additive Amendment

1962: Talmidge/Aujeb Act

1966: Fair Packaging and Labeling Act

1967: Wholesome Meat Act

1968: Wholesome Poultry Products Act

1968: Animal Drug Amendments

1970: Egg Products Inspection Act

1976: Vitamins and Minerals Amendment

1980: Instant Formula Act

1990: Sanitary Food Transportation Act of 1990

1990: Nutrition Labeling and Education Act

1990: Organic Foods Production Act

1994: Dietary Supplement Health and Education Act

1996: Federal Tea Tasters Repeal Act

1996: Food Quality Protection Act

1997: FDA Modernization Act

1997: National Economic Crossroads Transportation Efficiency Act

=== 2001–present ===
2002: Public Health Security and Bioterrorism Preparedness and Response Act

2002: Farm Security and Rural Investment Act

2003: Animal Drug User Fee Act

2004: Passage of the Food Allergy Labeling and Consumer Protection Act

2005: Sanitary Food Transportation Act

2011: Food Safety Modernization Act

2016: Agriculture Marketing Act

== Recent food-borne illness outbreaks ==
Listed are the deadliest incidents of food-borne illness in the past few decades:

1992–1993 – Jack in the Box E. coli outbreak: Beef patties distributed by Jack in the Box restaurants were contaminated with E. coli O15:H7. Investigators say 602 patients were infected with E. coli, 144 people were hospitalized, and three people died.

2003 – Chi Chi's Green Onion Hepatitis A outbreak: Green onions produced in Mexico were unknowingly infected with hepatitis A. These onions were served raw at a select Chi Chi restaurant near Pittsburgh, Pennsylvania. Of the 575 people who caught the disease, three people died.

2006 – Dole Baby Spinach E. coli outbreak: Baby spinach packaged in Dole's freshly bagged spinach was contaminated by the spinach field's proximity to cattle ranches. There were 238 who fell ill, of which 103 were hospitalized, and five people died.

2008 – King Nut Peanut Butter Salmonella outbreak: The King Nut creamy peanut butter was the source of a Salmonella outbreak throughout the United States with 714 total infected and a death toll of nine.

2011 – Cantaloupe listeriosis outbreak: Whole cantaloupes grown at Jensen Farms in Granada, Colorado were found to be contaminated with Listeria monocytogenes, a bacterium that causes listeriosis. The outbreak caused a total of 33 deaths from the 147 infected patients.

2015–2016 – Cucumber Salmonella outbreak: Investigators found Salmonella in cucumbers grown in Baja, Mexico and distributed by Andrew and Williamson Fresh produce. Of the 907 people infected with Salmonella, 204 were hospitalized, and six people died.

== See also ==
- List of food contamination incidents
