= Meat inspection =

Food safety measure

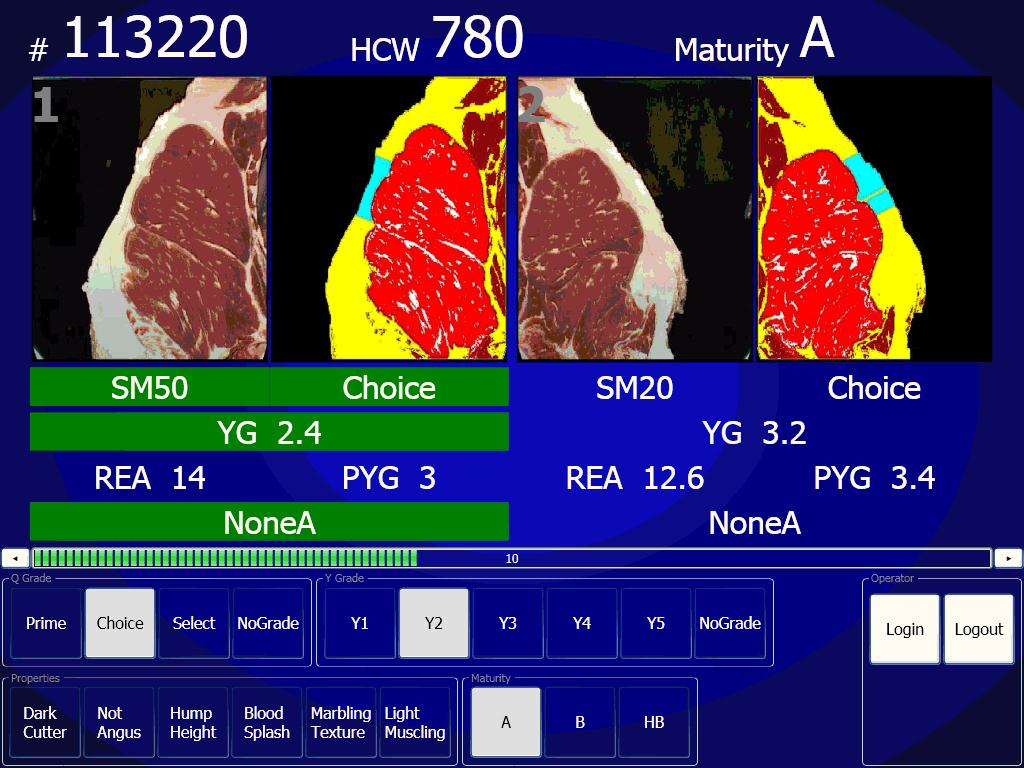
Screenshot from the electronic grading system showing USDA Choice, Yield Grade 2 beef. The left is the natural color view of the cut; the right is the instrument enhanced view that details the amount of marbling, size, and fat

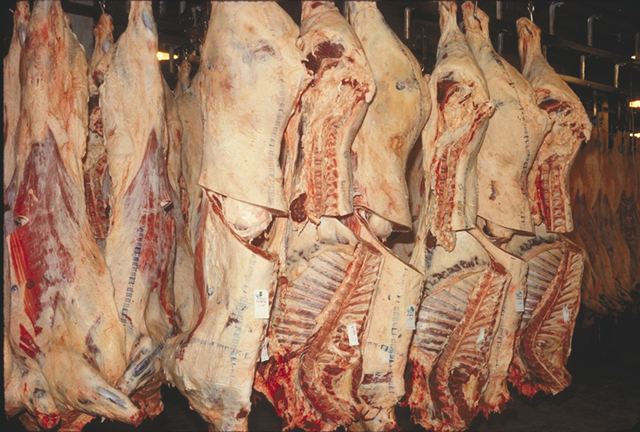
Inspected beef carcasses tagged by the USDA

Meat inspection is a crucial part of food safety measures and encompasses all measures directed towards the prevention of raw and processed meat spoilage. It was first recorded in the Mosaic law of the Hebrew Bible.

In the United States, Federal enforcement of meat inspection began in 1891, and were subsequently improved by Federal Meat Inspection Act (1906) and Pure Food and Drug Act (1906)—both partly a response to Upton Sinclair's The Jungle—then later Wholesome Meat Act (1967), and the Wholesome Poultry Products Act (1968).

Scientific counsel is provided by institutions like the American Meat Science Association and similar.

== See also ==
- American Meat Institute
- Food grading
- Gracey's Meat Hygiene, a veterinary textbook which deals with the topic
- Meat industry
