= Samuel Wadsworth Gould =

American politician (1852–1935)

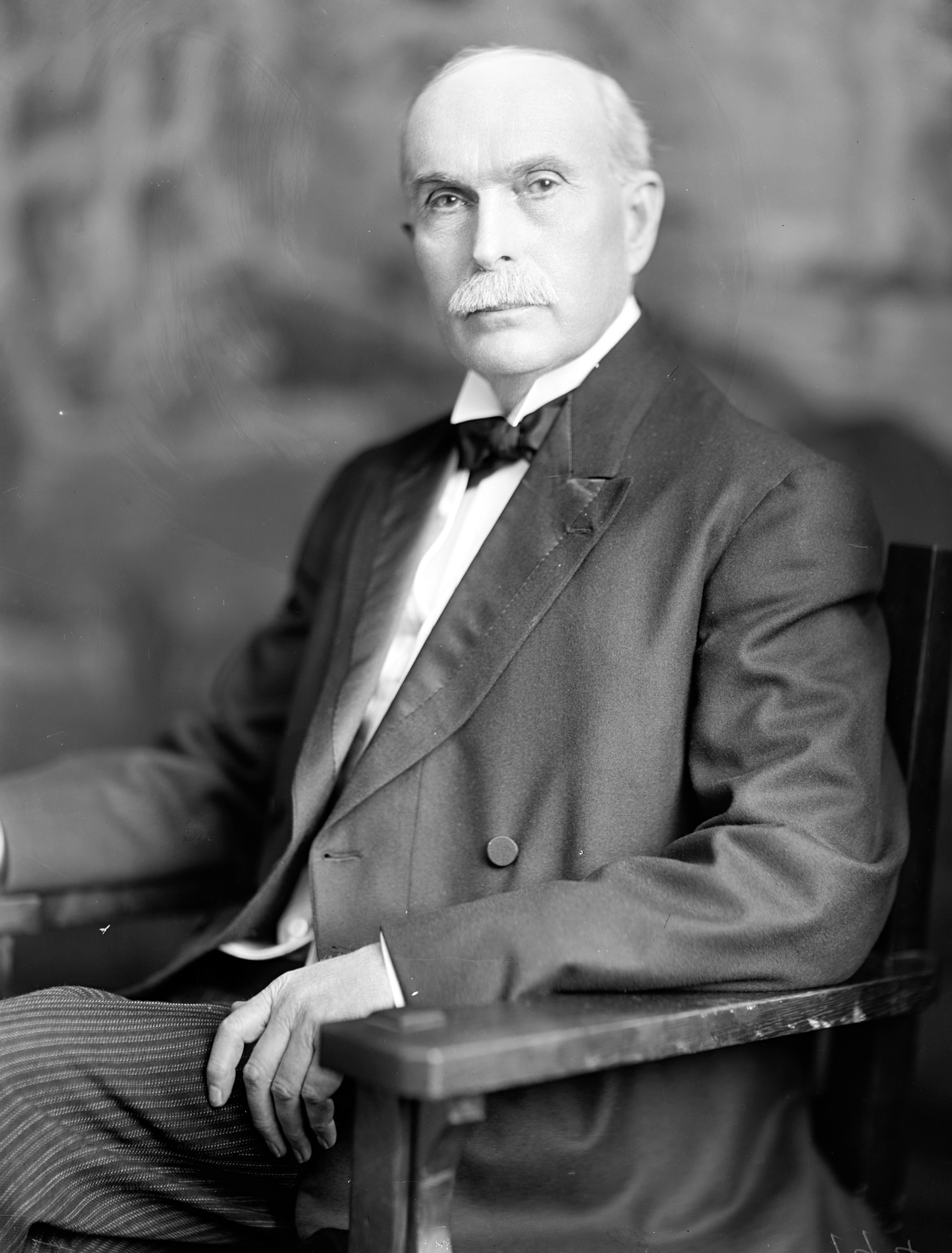

Member of the U.S. House of Representatives from Maine's 3rd congressional district
- In office March 4, 1911 – March 3, 1913
- Preceded by: Edwin C. Burleigh
- Succeeded by: John A. Peters

Personal details
- Born: January 1, 1852 Porter, Maine, U.S.
- Died: December 19, 1935 (aged 83) Skowhegan, Maine, U.S.
- Resting place: Southside Cemetery, Skowhegan
- Party: Democratic
- Education: University of Maine (1877)
- Profession: Lawyer, politician

Samuel Wadsworth Gould (January 1, 1852 – December 19, 1935) was an American politician from Maine. He served one-term in the United States House of Representatives from 1911 to 1913. In the waning days of his term, his bill, known as the Gould Amendment to the 1906 Pure Food and Drug Act, was passed. It required that the contents of any food package had to be “plainly and conspicuously marked on the outside of the package in terms of weight, measure, or numerical count and ingredients."

== Career ==
Born in Porter, Gould moved with his parents Elias and Ruth (Clemons) to Hiram. He attended the public schools and North Parsonsfield Seminary. He graduated from the University of Maine in 1877. Gould studied law, was admitted to the bar and commenced practice in Skowhegan in 1879. He opened a law firm with Edward F. Danforth. He served as postmaster of Skowhegan from 1896 to 1900.

Gould was involved with the Democratic Party, on both the state and federal levels, for many years. He attended all Democratic State conventions for more than forty years and served as secretary of the Maine Democratic State Committee from 1882 to 1890. He was a delegate to the Democratic National Conventions in 1900, 1908, and 1912.

He was the Democratic nominee for Governor of Maine in 1902, losing to incumbent Republican John Fremont Hill. He was defeated by six-term incumbent Edwin C. Burleigh for election to the 61st United States Congress in 1908. Two years later in September 1910, Gould defeated Burleigh and was elected to the 62nd United States Congress (March 4, 1911 – March 3, 1913). He was an unsuccessful candidate for re-election in 1912, defeated by John A. Peters. He resumed the practice of law in Skowhegan, became interested in various business enterprises and served as president of the board of trustees of the University of Maine. In October 1914, governor William T. Haines nominated Gould to the newly-established Maine Public Utilities Commission alongside William B. Skelton of Lewiston and Benjamin F. Cleaves of Biddeford. He died on December 19, 1935 and was buried in Skowhegan's Southside Cemetery.

== See also ==
- Gould House, his home in Skowhegan, was listed on the National Register of Historic Places in 1982. Gould's great grandson is Olympic gold medal-winning snowboarder Seth Wescott.

Party political offices
Preceded by Samuel L. Lord	Democratic nominee for Governor of Maine; 1902	Succeeded by Cyrus W. Davis
U.S. House of Representatives
Preceded by Edwin C. Burleigh	Member of the U.S. House of Representatives from Maine's 3rd congressional district March 4, 1911 – March 3, 1913	Succeeded by Forrest Goodwin
