= Gracey's Meat Hygiene =

Textbook first published in 1949

- Author: David S. Collins and Robert J. Huey (editors)
- Published: 1949 (1st ed.), 2015 (11th ed.)
- Publisher: Wiley-Blackwell
- ISBN: 978-1-118-65002-8

Gracey's Meat Hygiene is a veterinary textbook which deals with meat inspection and meat hygiene control. The eleventh edition of the book was published in 2015.

== Background ==
The book is an expansion of the book Textbook of Meat Hygiene (by Horace Thornton and J. F. Gracey) which itself is an expansion of Thornton's Textbook of Meat Inspection (published 1949).
