= 1902 Maine gubernatorial election =

- September 8, 1902
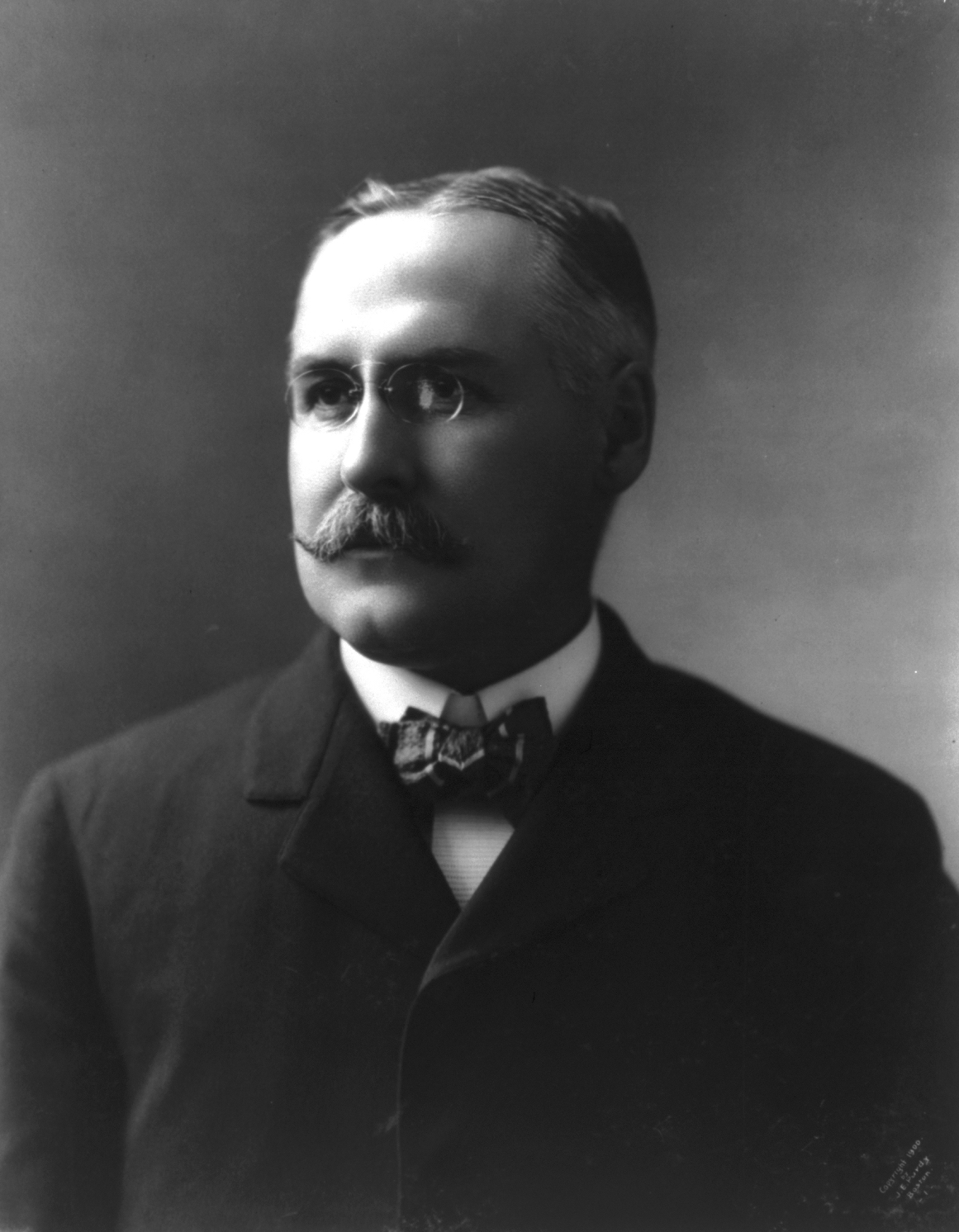

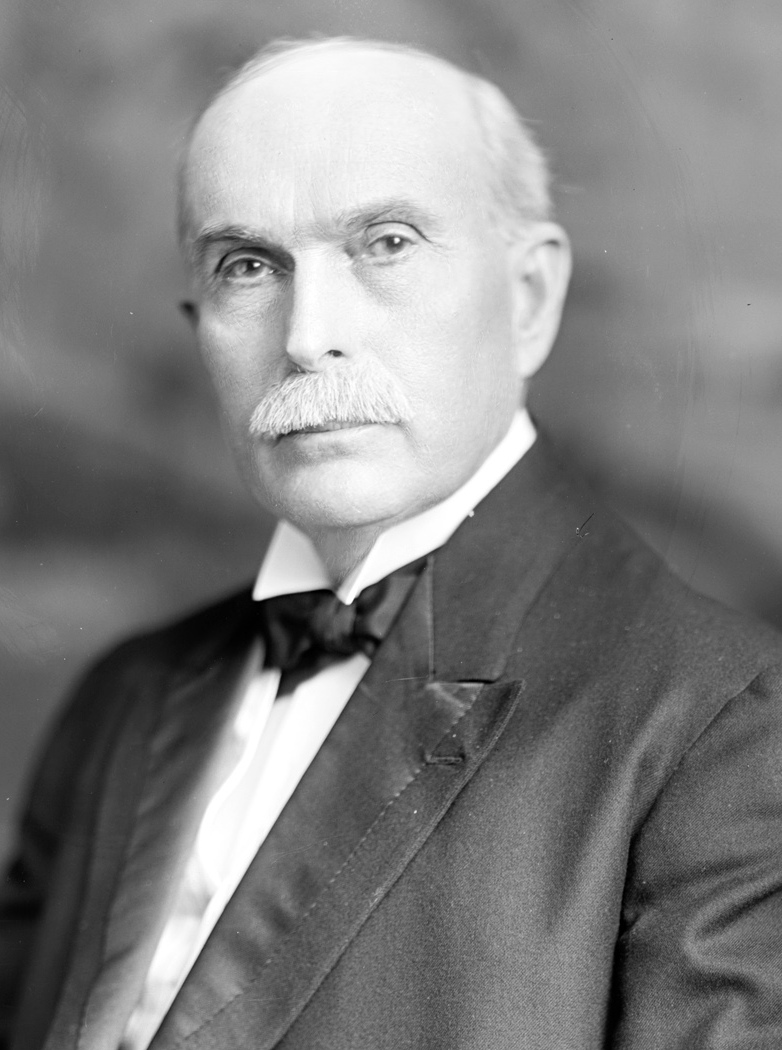
Nominee	John Fremont Hill	Samuel Wadsworth Gould
Party	Republican	Democratic
Popular vote	63,354	38,107
Percentage	58.73%	35.32%
- County results Hill: 50–60% 60–70% 70–80% Gould: 50–60%
Governor before election
John Fremont Hill
Republican
Elected Governor
John Fremont Hill
Republican

The 1902 Maine gubernatorial election took place on September 8, 1902.

Incumbent Republican Governor John Fremont Hill was re-elected to a second term in office, defeating Democratic candidate Samuel Wadsworth Gould.

== Results ==
1902 Maine gubernatorial election (Note: Some sources give Hill's total as 65,354. The Maine House Journal records the result as Hill 65,404, Gould 38,021, Perrigo 4,423, Fox 1,964, scattering 8.)
Party	Candidate	Votes	%	±%
Republican	John Fremont Hill (incumbent)	63,354	58.73%	
Democratic	Samuel Wadsworth Gould	38,107	35.32%	
Prohibition	James Perrigo	4,429	4.11%	
Socialist	Charles L. Fox	1,979	1.83%	
Scattering		8	0.01%	
Majority		25,247	23.41%	
Turnout		107,877	100.00%	
Republican hold		Swing		
