= Gould Amendment =

- Long title: A bill to amend section 8 of an act for preventing the manufacture sale or transportation of adulterated or misbranded or poisonous or deleterious foods drugs medicines and liquors and for regulating traffic therein and for other purposes.
- Enacted by: the 62nd United States Congress
- Effective: March 3, 1913

Citations
- Public law: Pub. L. 62–419
- Statutes at Large: 37 Stat. 732, Chapter 3915

Codification
- Acts amended: Pure Food and Drug Act
- Acts repealed: Pure Food and Drug Act (1906); 37 U.S. Stat. 416 (1912) (Sherley Amendment); 37 U.S. Stat. 732 (1913) (Gould Amendment); 41 U.S. Stat. 271 (1919) (Kenyon Amendment); 42 U.S. Stat. 1500 (1923); 44 U.S. Stat. 976-1003 (1927); 46 U.S. Stat. 1019 (1930) (McNary-Mapes Amendment); 48 U.S. Stat. 1204 (1934) (21 U.S.C. §§ 1-15)
- U.S.C. sections amended: Section 8

Legislative history
- Introduced in the House as H.R. 22526 by Samuel W. Gould (D–ME) on March 28, 1912; Committee consideration by Committee on Interstate and Foreign Commerce; Passed the House on August 5, 1912 (passed); Passed the Senate on August 5, 1912 (amended and passed); Reported by the joint conference committee on February 28, 1913; agreed to by the Senate on February 28, 1913 (28-23) and by the House on February 28, 1913 (agreed); Signed into law by President William H. Taft on March 3, 1913

Major amendments
- Food, Drug, and Cosmetic Act (1938)

The Gould Amendment sponsored by Rep. Samuel W. Gould (D) of Maine, amended the Pure Food and Drug Act of 1906 by requiring that the contents of any food package had to be “plainly and conspicuously marked on the outside of the package in terms of weight, measure, or numerical count and ingredients”
