= Samuel Gould House =

Historic house in Massachusetts, United States

- U.S. National Register of Historic Places
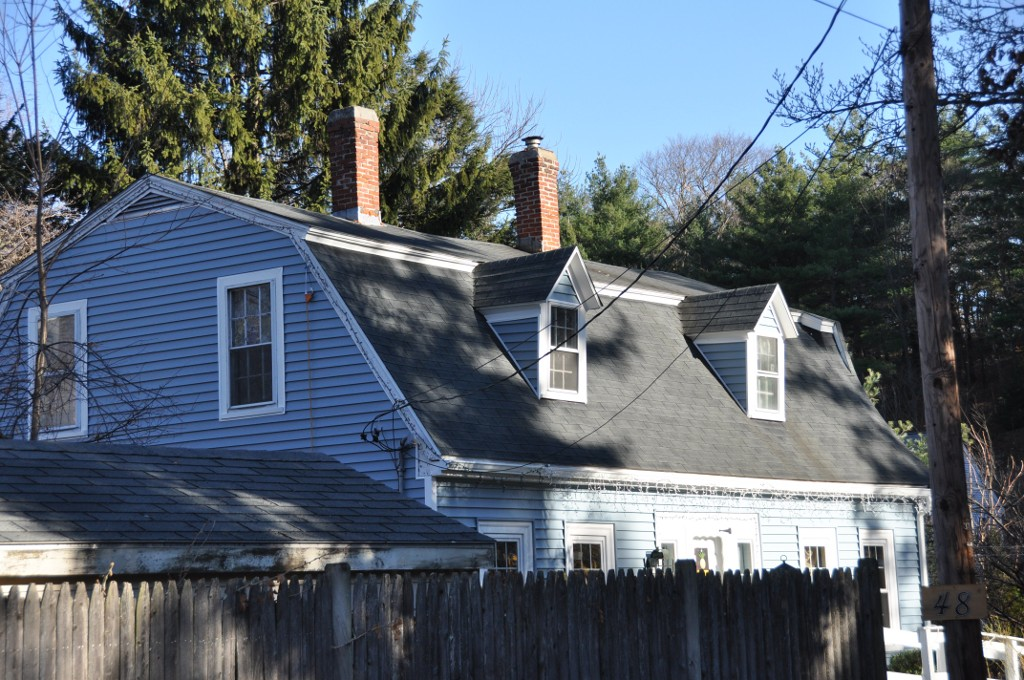

- Location within Massachusetts Location within the United States
- Location: 48 Meriam St., Wakefield, Massachusetts
- Coordinates: 42°29′10″N 71°4′12″W
- Built: 1735
- Architectural style: Georgian
- MPS: Wakefield MRA
- NRHP reference No.: 89000704
- Added to NRHP: July 6, 1989

The Samuel Gould House is a historic house at 48 Meriam Street in Wakefield, Massachusetts. Built c. 1735, it is one of the oldest houses in Wakefield, and its only surviving period 1 1/2-story gambrel-roofed house. It was built by Samuel Gould, whose family came to the area in the late 17th century. It has had modest later alterations, including a Greek Revival door surround dating to the 1830s-1850s, a porch, and the second story gable dormers.

The house was listed on the National Register of Historic Places in 1989.

== See also ==
- National Register of Historic Places listings in Wakefield, Massachusetts
- National Register of Historic Places listings in Middlesex County, Massachusetts
