= Gould House (Skowhegan, Maine) =

Historic house in Maine, United States

- U.S. National Register of Historic Places
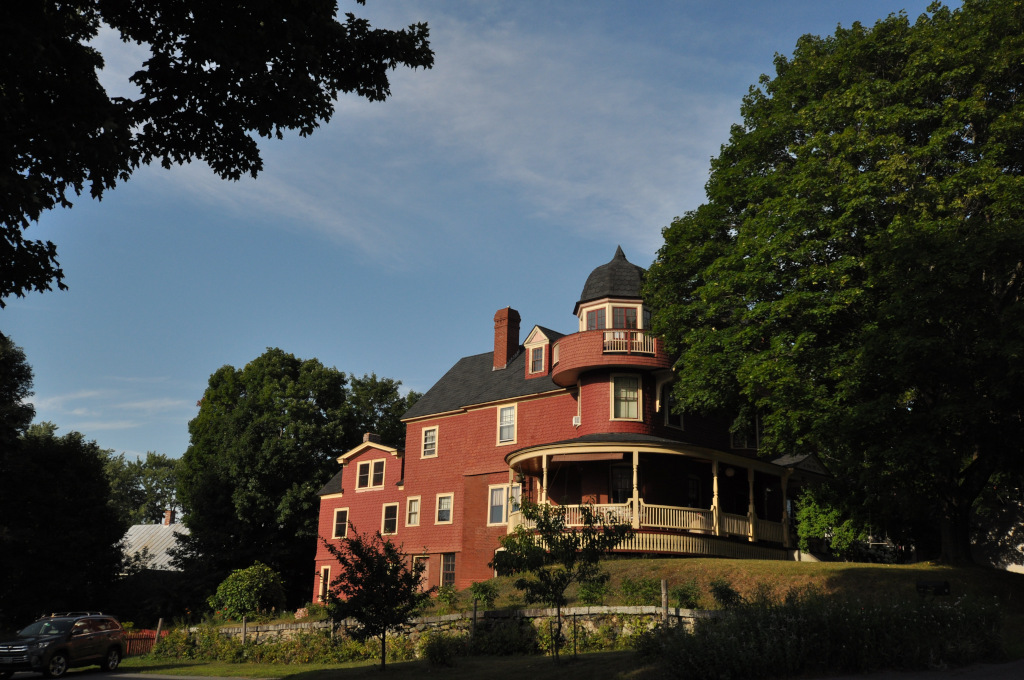
- Goud House, 2022

- Location within Maine Location within the United States
- Location: 31 Elm St., Skowhegan, Maine
- Coordinates: 44°46′1″N 69°43′23″W
- Area: 0.3 acres (0.12 ha)
- Built: 1887
- Architectural style: Queen Anne
- NRHP reference No.: 82001886
- Added to NRHP: February 19, 1982

The Gould House is a historic house at 27 Elm Street in Skowhegan, Maine. Built in 1887 by a prominent local lawyer and businessman, it is one of the finest examples of Queen Anne architecture in the interior of Maine. It was listed on the National Register of Historic Places in 1982.

== Description and history ==
The Gould House is set facing south on the north side of Elm Street, overlooking the Kennebec River. It is 2 1/2 stories in height, fashioned with brick and frame construction. The first floor and foundation are brick, and the upper floors are finished in decorative shingle siding. The asymmetrical massing is typical of the Queen Style, with an elaborately decorated single-story porch that curves around to the west side, and several different sizes and shapes of gables and projections from its roof. At the left front facade is a three-story tower topped by a bellcast octagonal roof. It has three brick chimneys rising from the interior, with elaborate brickwork decoration at the top. A period carriage barn is attached to the north side of the house.

The house was built in 1887 by Samuel Wadsworth Gould, a lawyer and hotel owner who opened his law practice in Skowhegan in 1880. He purchased the lot in 1885, then with a local tavern on it, moved it away, and had this house built. Gould, in addition to practicing law and owning a hotel, was politically active, winning election to the United States Congress for one term, and also running for Governor of Maine.

== See also ==
- National Register of Historic Places listings in Somerset County, Maine
