= Ebenezer Gould House =

- U.S. National Register of Historic Places
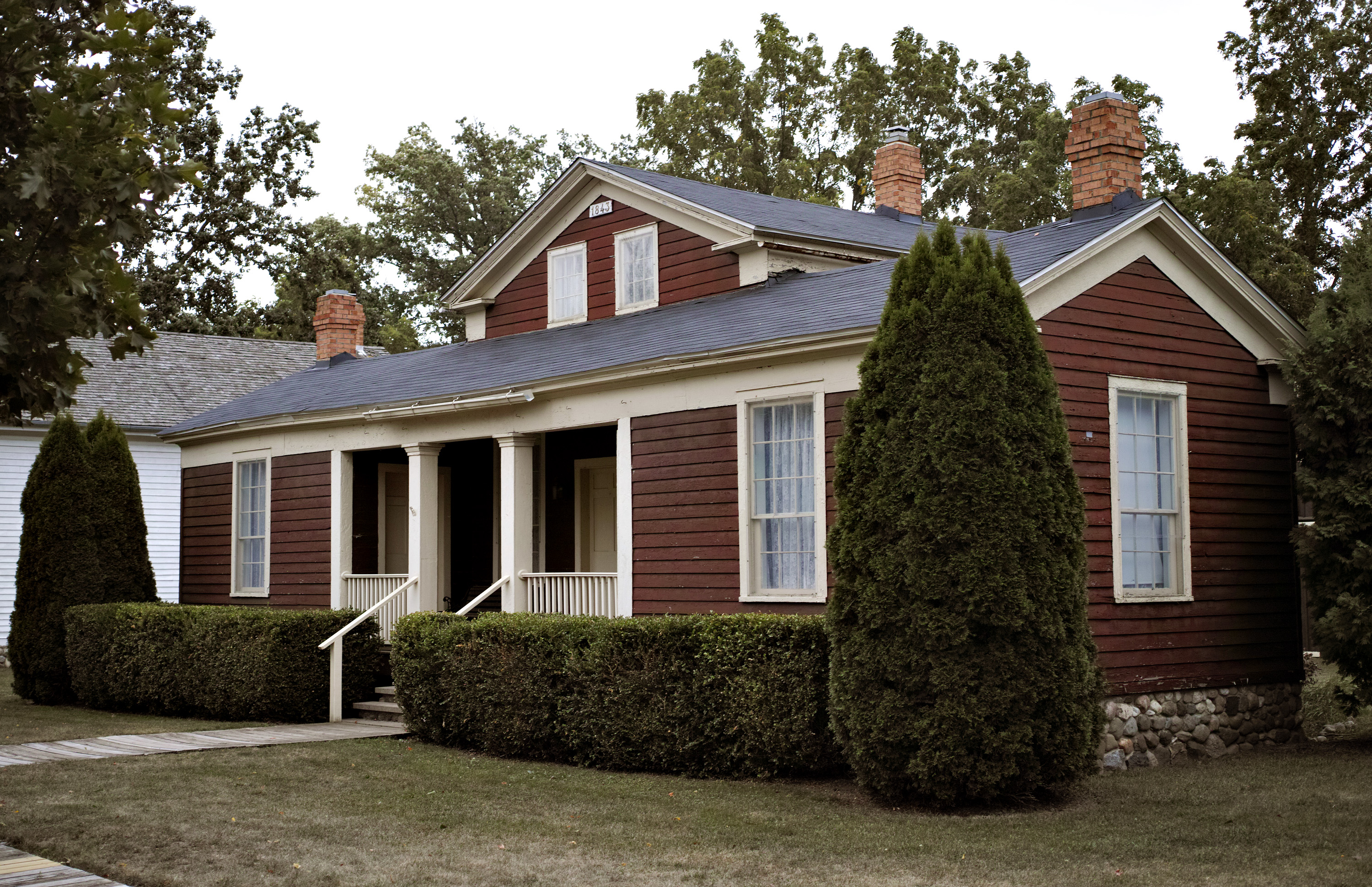
- Interactive map
- Location: 603 W. Main St., Owosso, Michigan
- Coordinates: 42°59′50″N 84°10′43″W
- Area: less than one acre
- Built: c. 1840
- Architectural style: Greek Revival
- MPS: Owosso MRA
- NRHP reference No.: 80001898
- Added to NRHP: November 4, 1980

The Ebenezer Gould House is a historic house in the Corunna Historical Village in Corunna, Michigan. The house was built in 1840 and added to the National Register of Historic Places on November 4, 1980.

== History ==
Ebenezer Gould came to Owosso, Michigan in 1837 and established a grocery. He first lived in a small structure, but in about 1843 constructed this Greek Revival house, then located at 603 W. Main Street in Owosso. Gould later became a lawyer and was involved in the formation of the Owosso and Saginaw Navigation Company, which cleared the Shiawassee River for navigation. He fought in the Civil War, reaching the rank of colonel in the 5th Michigan Volunteer Infantry Regiment. After returning to Owosso, he established a successful legal practice.

The most prominent later resident of the Gould House was Lyman E. Woodard, who founded the Woodard Furniture and Casket Company. The house was purchased by the Storrer family in 1919. In 1991, the house was relocated to a local museum village, The Corunna Historical Village, to make room for a McDonald's. It was donated by the then-owners, the Storrer family, and is maintained by a volunteer group.

== Description ==
The Ebenezer Gould House is a Greek Revival in style, constructed with an unusual T-shaped floorplan. The top of the T consists of a three bay wide single story section at the front of the house. This section contains a recessed main entryway, flanked by two nine-over-six double hung window units. The front is clad with clapboard, and has a gable roof with a broad fascia board below. A recessed porch supported by wood columns shelters the entryway. At the rear of the house is a two bay, two story section forming the base of the T-shaped floorplan. Two nine-pane windows are in the gable end above the front entrance.
