= Amos Gould House =

- U.S. National Register of Historic Places
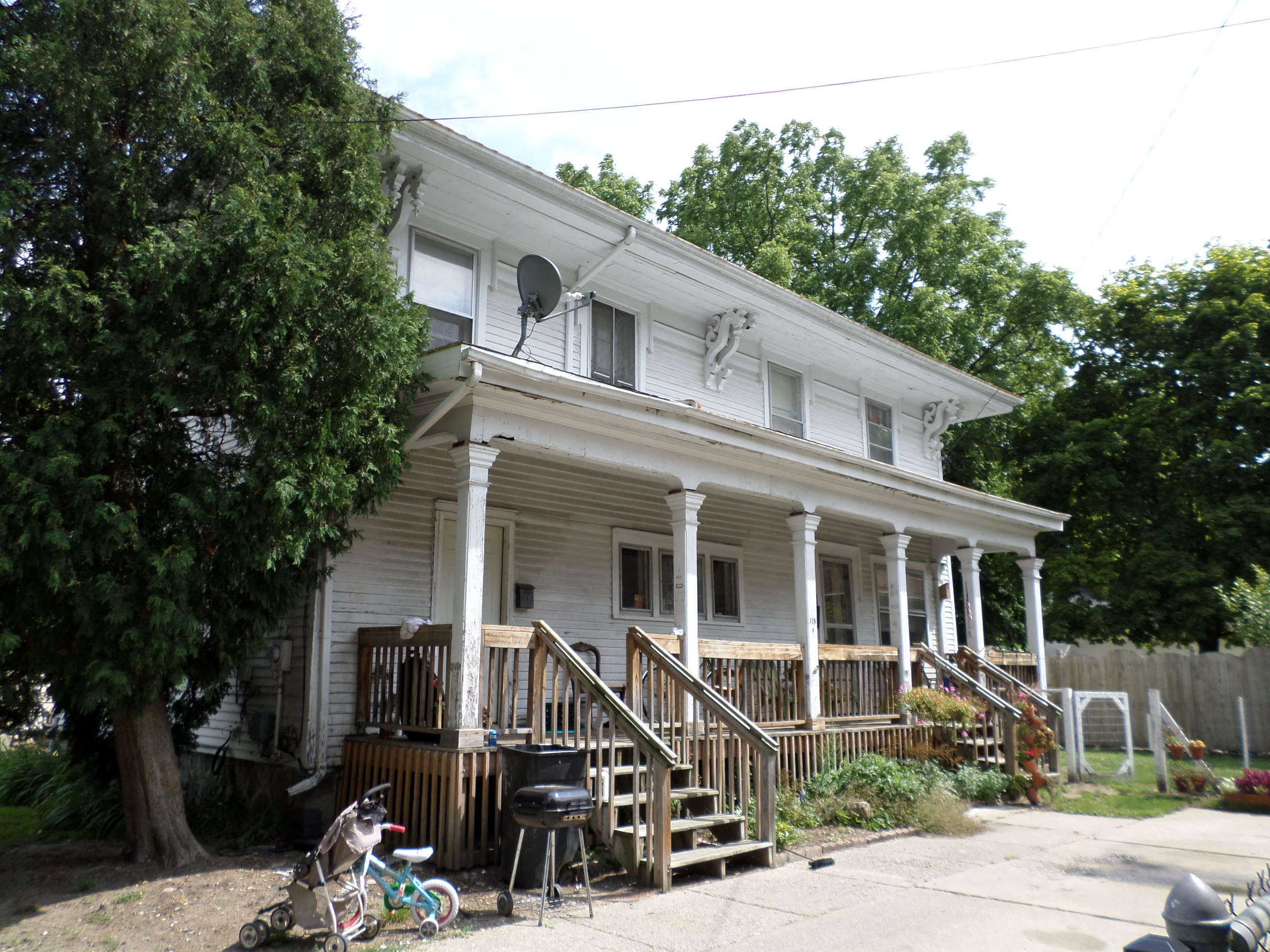
- Interactive map
- Location: 115 W. King St., Owosso, Michigan
- Coordinates: 43°00′16″N 84°10′18″W
- Area: less than one acre
- Built: 1848
- MPS: Owosso MRA
- NRHP reference No.: 80001896
- Added to NRHP: November 4, 1980

The Amos Gould House is a single-family home located at 115 West King Street in Owosso, Michigan. It is the original home of prominent Owosso citizen Amos Gould. The house was listed on the National Register of Historic Places in 1980.

== History ==
Amos Gould settled in Owosso in 1843. In approximately 1848 he constructed this house on Washington Street in the fashionable Oliver Street Historic District. In 1860 he constructed a second, larger house next door (now 515 N. Washington), relegating the original house to a kitchen and servants' quarters. In 1873, Gould completely remodeled the 1860 house by covering it with brick. The servants' quarters building was left substantially the same, but may have had the eave bracketry added at the time.

After the number of servants had decreased, the Gould family sold the servants' quarters. This original 1843 frame house, located on the North Lawn, was used through the years as a kitchen, serving quarters, laundry, storage and "caring for the ill." In 1906, it was placed on skids and slid on the ice down the alley to 115 West King Street where it remains today.

The secondary house built in 1859, originally an Italian Villa, Gould remodeled in 1873 in the Second Empire style, remained in the Gould family until 1938, when Mary Lena Gould, the last family member to live there, had the upstairs converted into two rental apartments. The Owosso Historical Commission purchased the house in 1979 and maintained it as a museum until 2019. In 2024, the property was sold to private owners, who began restoration work and reactivated the building as a local attraction and event venue for community gatherings under the name "Gould Historic".

== Description ==
The original 1843 Amos Gould House is a balloon-framed structure covered with clapboard. It has symmetrical window placement and a hipped roof with a simple roofline, supported with elaborately carved brackets. These were likely added during the 1873 remodeling.
