= Capt. Joseph Gould House =

Historic house in Massachusetts, United States

- U.S. National Register of Historic Places
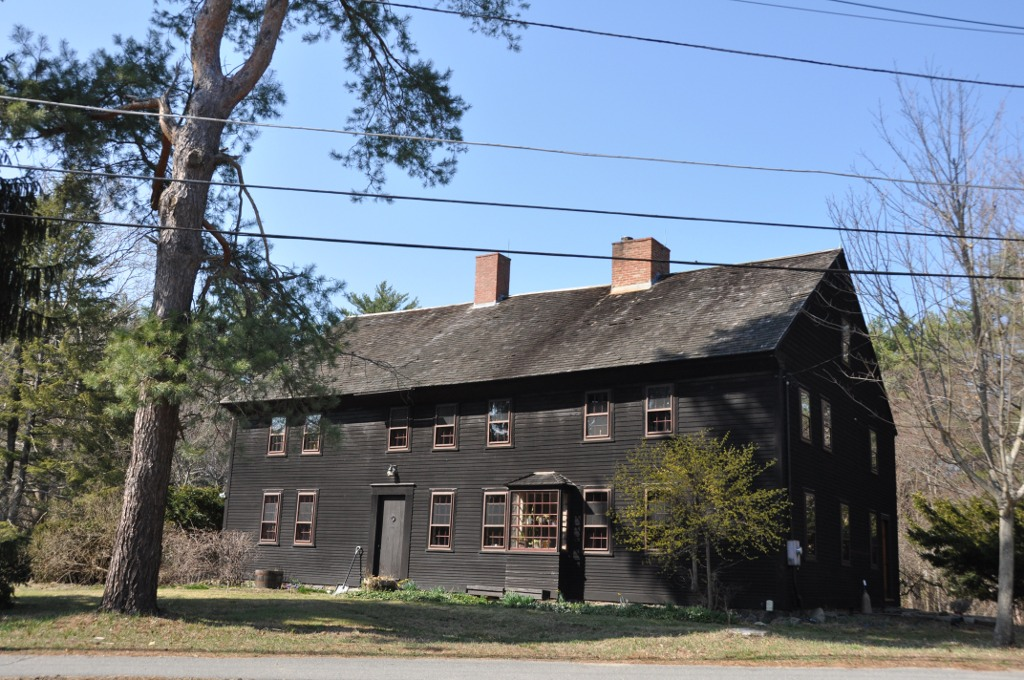

- Location within Massachusetts Location within the United States
- Location: 129 Washington Street, Topsfield, Massachusetts
- Coordinates: 42°38′30″N 70°58′2″W
- Built: 1710
- Architectural style: Colonial
- MPS: First Period Buildings of Eastern Massachusetts TR
- NRHP reference No.: 90000259
- Added to NRHP: March 9, 1990

The Capt. Joseph Gould House is a historic First Period house in Topsfield, Massachusetts. It is a 2.5-story frame house that is six bays wide and two rooms deep. The oldest part of the house, the eastern three bays, may have been built in the late 17th century; it achieved the present footprint with an addition in the early 18th century of the western bays. The house is distinctive among First Period houses in the region because its original portion was built from the start to be two rooms deep, when most houses of the period started out one room deep and were extended to the rear later.

The house was listed on the National Register of Historic Places in 1990.

== See also ==
- National Register of Historic Places listings in Essex County, Massachusetts
