= Daniel Gould House =

- U.S. National Register of Historic Places
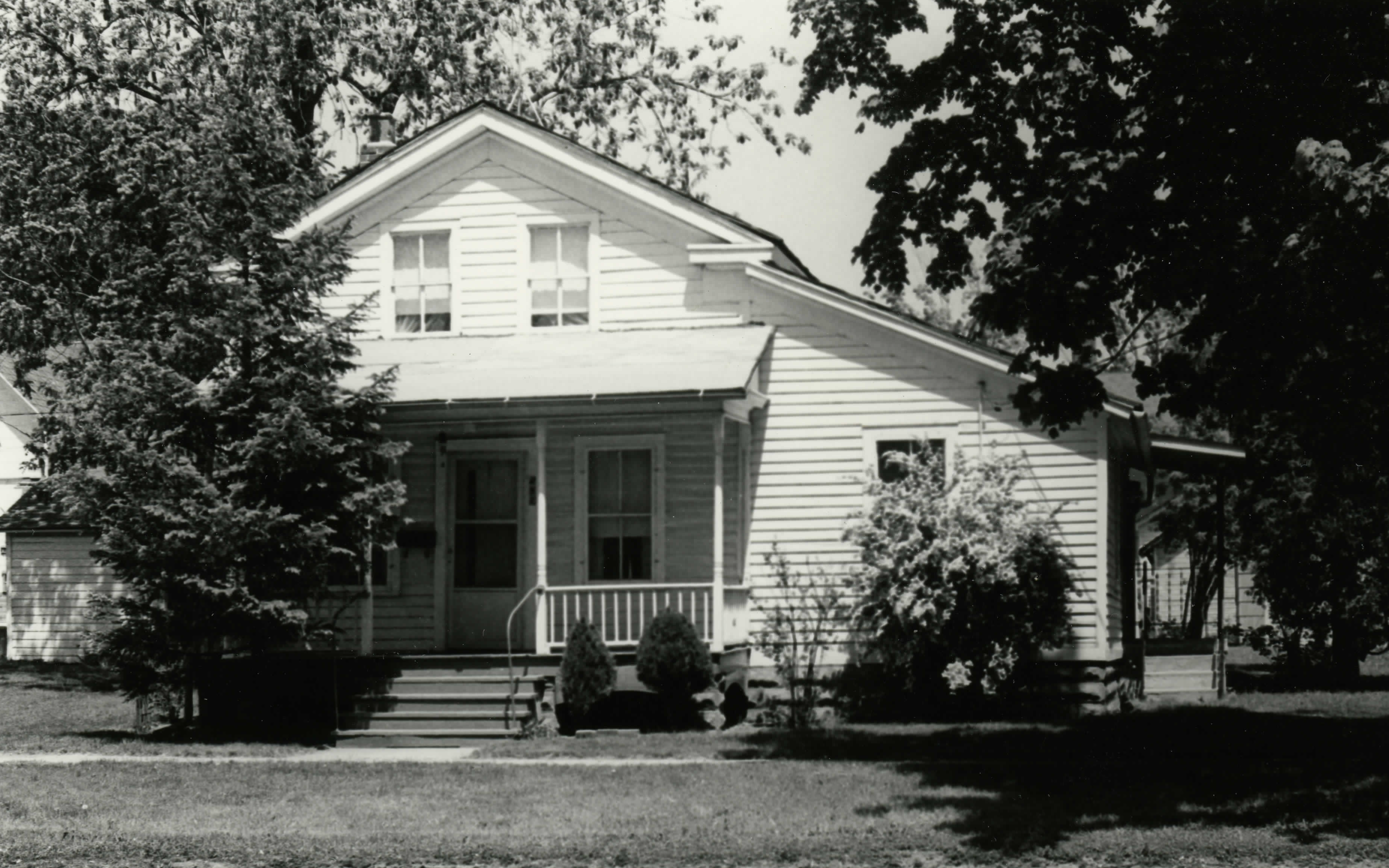
- Daniel Gould House in 1980
- Interactive map
- Location: 509 E. Main St., Owosso, Michigan
- Coordinates: 42°59′51″N 84°09′51″W
- Area: less than one acre
- Built: 1879
- Built by: Daniel Gould
- Architectural style: Greek Revival
- MPS: Owosso MRA
- NRHP reference No.: 80001897
- Added to NRHP: November 4, 1980

The Daniel Gould House was a single-family home located at 509 East Main Street in Owosso, Michigan. It was listed on the National Register of Historic Places in 1980. The house is missing and presumably demolished.

== History ==
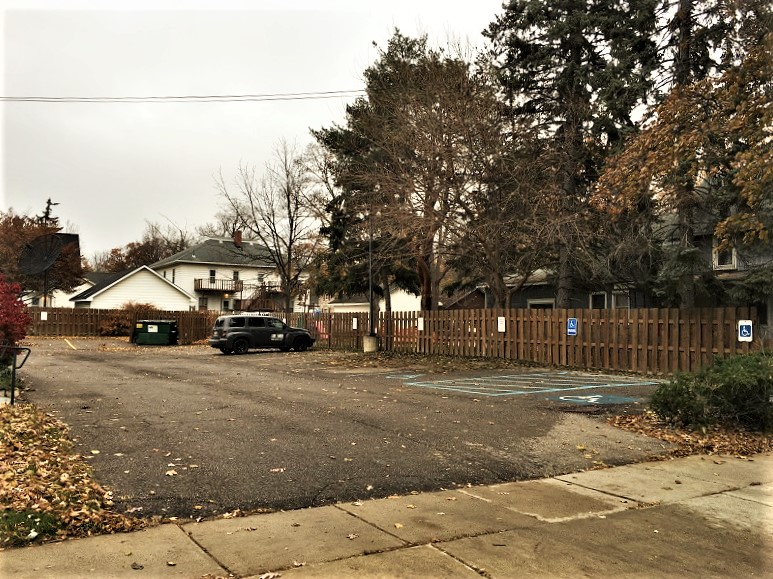
Former location of Daniel Gould House, 2017

Daniel Gould was born in New York State, and later moved to Byron, Michigan. There he married Angeline Hammond in 1831. The couple moved to Owosso in 1837, where Daniel surveyed and mapped Owosso for the first time. The couple constructed this house soon after arriving in Owosso. The Goulds became one of the most prominent and socially connected families in the city. In 1879, the house was moved to 509 East Main Street.

In addition to the Goulds, the house served as home for R. Morrison; local bricklayer Dillas Martin; building mover Charles S. Lockwood; and Grand Union Tea Company sales representative Edward Pettite. The house was presumably demolished some time between 1980 and 2017.

== Description ==
The Daniel Gould House was a two bay, two story rectangular Greek Revival structure. It was built of built of hand-hewn beams secured with wooden pegs, and the exterior was sheathed in clapboard. A side ell of similar construction and design may have been original to the structure. The house had a balanced placement of windows and an attractive corniceline with fascia boards and returns.
