= Wholesome Meat Act =

US law

- Long title: An Act to clarify and otherwise amend the Meat Inspection Act, to provide for cooperation with appropriate State agencies with respect to State meat inspection programs, and for other purposes.
- Acronyms (colloquial): WMA
- Nicknames: Wholesome Meat Act of 1967
- Enacted by: the 90th United States Congress
- Effective: December 15, 1967

Citations
- Public law: 90-201
- Statutes at Large: 81 Stat. 584

Codification
- Acts amended: Federal Meat Inspection Act
- Titles amended: 21 U.S.C.: Food and Drugs
- U.S.C. sections amended: 21 U.S.C. ch. 12 § 601 et seq.

Legislative history
- Introduced in the House as H.R. 12144 by Graham B. Purcell Jr. (D–TX); Committee consideration by House Agriculture, Senate Agriculture and Forestry; Passed the House on October 31, 1967 (402-1); Passed the Senate on November 28, 1967 (89-2); Reported by the joint conference committee on November 29, 1967; agreed to by the House on December 6, 1967 (336-28) and by the Senate on December 6, 1967 (Agreed); Signed into law by President Lyndon B. Johnson on December 15, 1967

The Wholesome Meat Act (also called "Equal To" law) is a United States federal law passed by the 90th United States Congressional session and enacted into law by United States President Lyndon B. Johnson on December 15, 1967, amending the Federal Meat Inspection Act of 1906 which established a statute for federal meat inspection programs. It requires that states have inspection programs "equal to" that of the federal government which are administered by the Food Safety and Inspection Service (FSIS) of the United States Department of Agriculture (USDA).

== See also ==
- Humane Slaughter Act
