= Federal Meat Inspection Act =

1906 U.S. law regulating the meat industry

- Long title: An Act Making appropriations for the Department of Agriculture for the fiscal year ending June thirtieth, nineteen hundred and seven.
- Acronyms (colloquial): FMIA
- Nicknames: Agricultural Department Appropriations (1906)
- Enacted by: the 59th United States Congress
- Effective: June 30, 1906

Citations
- Public law: Pub. L. 59–382
- Statutes at Large: 34 Stat. 669

Codification
- Titles amended: 21 U.S.C.: Food and Drugs
- U.S.C. sections created: 21 U.S.C. ch. 12 § 601 et seq.

Legislative history
- Introduced in the House of Representatives as H.R. 18537; Signed into law by President Theodore Roosevelt on June 30, 1906

Major amendments
- Wholesome Meat Act of 1967

The Federal Meat Inspection Act of 1906 (FMIA) is a U.S. law that makes it illegal to adulterate or misbrand meat and meat products being sold as food, and ensures that meat and meat products are slaughtered and processed under strictly regulated sanitary conditions. These requirements also apply to imported meat products, which must be inspected under equivalent foreign standards. United States Department of Agriculture (USDA) inspection of poultry was added by the Poultry Products Inspection Act of 1957 (PPIA). The Food, Drug, and Cosmetic Act authorizes the Food and Drug Administration (FDA) to provide inspection services for all livestock and poultry species not listed in the FMIA or PPIA, including venison and buffalo. The Agricultural Marketing Act authorizes the USDA to offer voluntary, fee-for-service inspection services for these same species.

== Historical motivation for enactment ==
The original 1906 Act authorized the Secretary of Agriculture to inspect and condemn any meat product found unfit for human consumption. Unlike previous laws ordering meat inspections, which were enforced to assure European nations from banning pork trade, this law was strongly motivated to protect the American diet. All labels on any type of food had to be accurate (although not all ingredients were provided on the label). Even though all harmful food was banned, many warnings were still provided on the container. The production date for canned meats was a requirement in the legislation that Senator Albert Beveridge introduced but it was later removed in the House bill that was passed and became law. The law was partly a response to the publication of Upton Sinclair's The Jungle, an exposé of the Chicago meat packing industry, as well as to other Progressive Era muckraking publications of the day. While Sinclair's dramatized account was intended to bring attention to the terrible working conditions in Chicago, the public was more horrified by the prospect of bad meat.

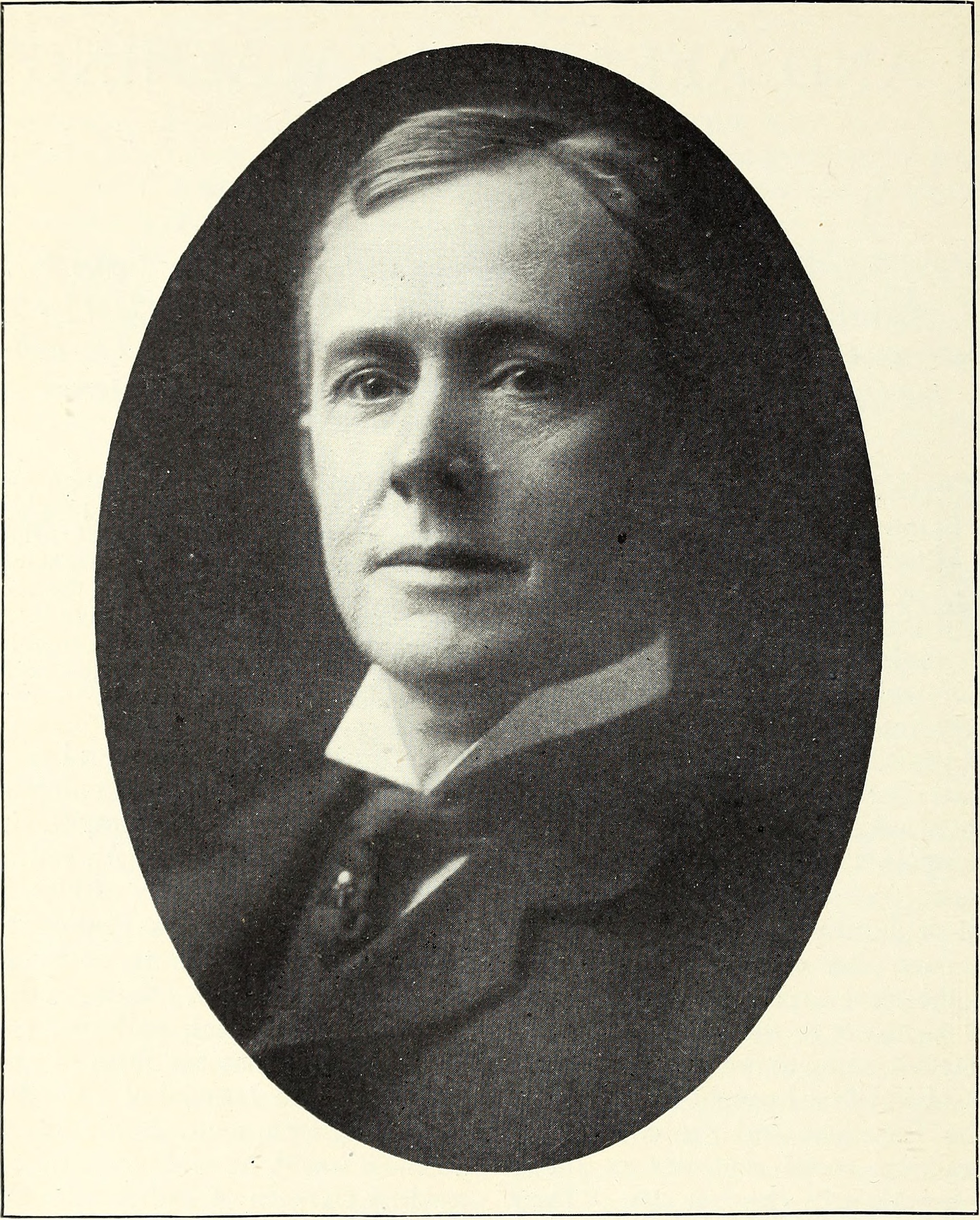
James Bronson Reynolds, 1907

The book's assertions were confirmed in the Neill-Reynolds report, commissioned by President Theodore Roosevelt in 1906. Roosevelt was suspicious of Sinclair's socialist attitude and conclusions in The Jungle, so he sent labor commissioner Charles P. Neill and social worker James Bronson Reynolds, men whose honesty and reliability he trusted, to Chicago to make surprise visits to meat packing facilities.

Despite betrayal of the secret to the meat packers, who worked three shifts a day for three weeks to thwart the inspection, Neill and Reynolds were still revolted by the conditions at the factories and at the lack of concern by plant managers (though neither had much experience in the field). Following their report, Roosevelt became a supporter of regulation of the meat packing industry, and, on June 30, signed the Meat Inspection Act of 1906.

The FMIA mandated the United States Department of Agriculture (USDA) inspection of meat processing plants that conducted business across state lines. The Pure Food and Drug Act, enacted on the same day (June 30, 1906), also gave the government broad jurisdiction over food in interstate commerce.

The four primary requirements of the Meat Inspection Act of 1906 were:

1. Mandatory inspection of livestock before slaughter (cattle, sheep, goats, equines, and swine);
2. Mandatory postmortem inspection of every carcass;
3. Sanitary standards established for slaughterhouses and meat processing plants; and
4. Authorized U.S. Department of Agriculture ongoing monitoring and inspection of slaughter and processing operations.

After 1906, many additional laws that further standardized the meat industry and its inspection were passed.

== Preemption of state law ==
In 2012, the U.S. Supreme Court ruled in National Meat Assn. v. Harris, that the FMIA preempts a California law regulating the treatment of non-ambulatory livestock.

== Amendments to 1907 Act ==
Chronological legislation relative to U.S. Congressional revisions concerning the Federal Meat Inspection Act.

Date of Enactment	Public Law Number	U.S. Statute Citation	U.S. Legislative Bill	U.S. Presidential Administration
June 29, 1938	P.L. 75-776	52 Stat. 1235	H.R. 8047	Franklin D. Roosevelt
June 10, 1942	P.L. 77-602	56 Stat. 351	H.J.Res. 315	Franklin D. Roosevelt
June 5, 1948	P.L. 80-610	62 Stat. 344	S. 2256	Harry S. Truman
December 15, 1967	P.L. 90-201	81 Stat. 584	H.R. 12144	Lyndon B. Johnson
July 18, 1970	P.L. 91-342	84 Stat. 438	S. 3592	Richard M. Nixon
October 10, 1978	P.L. 95-445	92 Stat. 1069	S. 3092	Jimmy Carter
October 17, 1984	P.L. 98-487	98 Stat. 2264	H.R. 5223	Ronald W. Reagan
December 7, 1989	P.L. 101-205	103 Stat. 1829	H.R. 2134	George H. W. Bush

== See also ==
- Humane Slaughter Act
- Packers and Stockyards Act
- Pure Food and Drug Act
