= Pure Food and Drug Act =

1906 United States consumer protection law

- Acronyms (colloquial): PFDA
- Enacted by: the 59th United States Congress
- Effective: January 1, 1907

Citations
- Public law: 59-384
- Statutes at Large: 34 Stat. 768, Chapter 3915

Codification
- Acts repealed: Pure Food and Drug Act (1906); 37 U.S. Stat. 416 (1912) (Sherley Amendment); 37 U.S. Stat. 732 (1913) (Gould Amendment); 41 U.S. Stat. 271 (1919) (Kenyon Amendment); 42 U.S. Stat. 1500 (1923); 44 U.S. Stat. 976-1003 (1927); 46 U.S. Stat. 1019 (1930) (McNary-Mapes Amendment); 48 U.S. Stat. 1204 (1934) (21 U.S.C. §§ 1-15)
- Titles amended: 21 U.S.C.: Food and Drugs

Legislative history
- Introduced in the Senate as S. 88 by Weldon Heyburn (R–ID) on December 14, 1905; Passed the Senate on February 21, 1906 (63-4); Passed the House on June 20, 1906 (143-72); Reported by the joint conference committee on June 23, 1906; agreed to by the House on June 23, 1906 (Did not agree) and by the Senate on June 23, 1906 (241-17); Signed into law by President Theodore Roosevelt on June 30, 1906

Major amendments
- Food, Drug, and Cosmetic Act (1938); Food Quality Protection Act (1996)

United States Supreme Court cases
- United States v. Johnson (1911)

The Pure Food and Drug Act of 1906 was the first of a series of significant consumer protection laws enacted by the United States Congress, and led to the creation of the Food and Drug Administration (FDA). Its main purpose was to ban foreign and interstate traffic in adulterated or mislabeled food and drug products, and it directed the US Department of Agriculture's (USDA) Bureau of Chemistry to inspect products and refer offenders to prosecutors. It required that active ingredients be placed on the label of a drug's packaging and that drugs could not fall below purity levels established by the United States Pharmacopeia or the National Formulary. This law is also known as the Wiley Act and Dr. Wiley's Law for USDA Chief Chemist Harvey Washington Wiley's advocacy for its passage.

In the late 1800s, the quality of food in the US decreased significantly as populations moved to cities and the time from farm to market increased. Many food producers turned to using dangerous preservatives, including formaldehyde, to keep food appearing fresh. Simultaneously, the quality of medicine was appalling. Quack medicine was common, and many drugs were addictive or dangerous without actually providing a curative effect. Opium and alcohol were chief ingredients, even in infant medicines. The work of muckraking journalists exposed the practices of food and drug industries and caused public outcry.

Foremost among such exposés was The Jungle by Upton Sinclair, published the same year as the act. With its graphic and revolting descriptions of unsanitary conditions and unscrupulous practices rampant in the meat-packing industry, it kept the public's attention on the extreme unhygienic conditions in meat processing plants. Sinclair quipped, "I aimed at the public's heart and by accident I hit it in the stomach," as an outraged public demanded government action, resulting in the Pure Food and Drug Act and the Federal Meat Inspection Act of 1906.

== Historical significance ==
The Pure Food and Drug Act of 1906 was a key piece of Progressive Era legislation, signed by President Theodore Roosevelt on the same day as the Federal Meat Inspection Act. Enforcement of the Pure Food and Drug Act was assigned to the Bureau of Chemistry in the U.S. Department of Agriculture which was renamed the U.S. Food and Drug Administration (FDA) in 1930. The Meat Inspection Act was assigned to what is now known as the Food Safety and Inspection Service, which remains in the U.S. Department of Agriculture. The first federal law regulating foods and drugs, the 1906 Act's reach was limited to foods and drugs moving in interstate commerce. Although the law drew upon many precedents, provisions, and legal experiments pioneered in individual states, the federal law defined "misbranding" and "adulteration" for the first time and prescribed penalties for each. The law recognized the U.S. Pharmacopeia and the National Formulary as standards authorities for drugs, but made no similar provision for federal food standards. The law was principally a "truth in labeling" law designed to raise standards in the food and drug industries and protect the reputations and pocketbooks of honest businessmen.

== Particular drugs deemed addictive ==
Under the law, drug labels, for example, had to list any of 10 ingredients that were deemed "addictive" and/or "dangerous" on the product label if they were present, and could not list them if they were not present. Alcohol, morphine, opium, and cannabis were all included on the list of these "addictive" and/or "dangerous" drugs. The law also established a federal cadre of food and drug inspectors that one Southern opponent of the legislation criticized as "a Trojan horse with a bellyful of inspectors and other employees." Penalties under the law were modest, but an under-appreciated provision of the Act proved more powerful than monetary penalties. Goods found in violation of various areas of the law were subject to seizure and destruction at the expense of the manufacturer. That, combined with a legal requirement that all convictions be published as Notices of Judgment, proved to be important tools in the enforcement of the statute and had a deterrent effect upon would-be violators.

Deficiencies in this original statute, which had become noticeable by the 1920s, led to the replacement of the 1906 statute with the Federal Food, Drug, and Cosmetic Act which was enacted in 1938 and signed by President Franklin Roosevelt. This act, along with its numerous amendments, remains the statutory basis for federal regulation of all foods, drugs, biological products, cosmetics, medical devices, tobacco, and radiation-emitting devices by the U.S. Food and Drug Administration.

== History of passage ==
An 1882 article in Scientific American describes "New Laws for Analyzing Food and Drugs" and highlights historical aspects. Part of the draft stated:

"An article shall be deemed to be adulterated within the meaning of this act.

A.-In the case of drugs:
* If, when sold under or by a name recognized in the United States Pharmacopeia, it differs from the standard of strength, quality, or purity laid down in such work.
* If when sold under or by a name not recognized in the United States Pharmacopeia, but which is found in some other pharmacopeia or ether standard work on materia medica, it differs from the standard of strength, quality, or purity laid down in such work.
* If its strength or purity fall below the professed standard under which it is sold

B.-In the case of food or drink:
* If any substance or substances has or have been mixed with it as to reduce or lower or injuriously affect its quality of strength
* If any inferior or cheaper substance or substances have been substituted wholly or in part for the article
*If any valuable constituent of the article has been wholly or is part abstracted
* If it be an imitation of or be sold under the name of another article
* If it consists wholly or in part of a diseased or decomposed, or putrid or rotten, animal or vegetable substance, whether manufactured or not, or in the case of milk, if it is the produce of a diseased animal
* If it be colored, or coated, or polished, or powdered, whereby damage is concealed, or it is made to appear better than it really is, or of greater value"

―Scientific American, 7 Jan 1882

It took 27 years to adopt the 1906 statute, during which time the public was made aware of many problems with foods and drugs in the U.S. Muckraking journalists, such as Samuel Hopkins Adams, targeted the patent medicine industry with its high-alcoholic content patent medicines, soothing syrups for infants with opium derivatives, and "red clauses" in newspaper contracts providing that patent medicine ads (upon which most newspapers of the time were dependent) would be withdrawn if the paper expressed support for food and drug regulatory legislation.

The Chief Chemist of the Bureau of Chemistry, Dr. Harvey Washington Wiley, captured the country's attention with his hygienic table studies, which began with a modest Congressional appropriation in 1902. The goal of the table trial was to study the human effects of common preservatives used in foods during a period of rapid changes in the food supply brought about by the need to feed cities and support an industrializing nation increasingly dependent on immigrant labor. Wiley recruited young men to eat all their meals at a common table as he added increased "doses" of preservatives including borax, benzoate, formaldehyde, sulfites, and salicylates. The table trials captured the nation's fancy and were soon dubbed "The Poison Squad" by newspapers covering the story. The men soon adopted the motto "Only the Brave dare eat the fare" and at times the publicity given to the trials became a burden. Though many results of the trial came to be in dispute, there was no doubt that formaldehyde was dangerous and it disappeared quickly as a preservative. Wiley himself felt that he had found adverse effects from large doses of each of the preservatives and the public seemed to agree with Wiley. In many cases, most particularly with ketchup and other condiments, the use of preservatives was often used to disguise unsanitary production practices. Although the law itself did not proscribe the use of some of these preservatives, consumers increasingly turned away from many products with known preservatives.

The 1906 statute regulated food and drugs moving in interstate commerce and forbade the manufacture, sale, or transportation of poisonous patent medicines. The Act arose due to public education and exposes from public interest guardians such as Upton Sinclair and Samuel Hopkins Adams, social activist Florence Kelley, researcher Harvey W. Wiley, and President Theodore Roosevelt.

== Beginnings of the Food and Drug Administration ==
The 1906 Act paved the way for the eventual creation of the Food and Drug Administration (FDA) and is generally considered to be that agency's founding date, though the agency existed before the law was passed and was not named FDA until later. "While the Food and Drug act remains a foundational law of the FDA mission, it's not the law that created the FDA. [Initially,] the Bureau of Chemistry (the precursor to the FDA) regulated food safety. In 1927, the Bureau was reorganized into the Food, Drug, and Insecticide Administration and the Bureau of Chemistry and Soils. The FDIA was renamed the FDA in 1930."

The law itself was largely replaced by the much more comprehensive Federal Food, Drug, and Cosmetic Act of 1938.

== Enforcement of labeling and future ramifications ==
The Pure Food and Drug Act was initially concerned with ensuring products were labeled correctly. Later efforts were made to outlaw certain products that were not safe, followed by efforts to outlaw products which were safe but not effective. For example, there was an attempt to outlaw Coca-Cola in 1909 because of its excessive caffeine content; caffeine had replaced cocaine as the active ingredient in Coca-Cola in 1903. In the case United States v. Forty Barrels and Twenty Kegs of Coca-Cola, the judge found that Coca-Cola had a right to use caffeine as it saw fit, although Coca-Cola eventually lost when the government appealed to the Supreme Court. It reached a settlement with the United States government to reduce the caffeine amount.

In addition to caffeine, the Pure Food and Drug Act required that drugs such as alcohol, cocaine, heroin, morphine, and cannabis, be accurately labeled with contents and dosage. Previously many drugs had been sold as patent medicines with secret ingredients or misleading labels. Cocaine, heroin, cannabis, and other such drugs continued to be legally available without prescription as long as they were labeled. It is estimated that sale of patent medicines containing opiates decreased by 33% after labeling was mandated. The Pure Food and Drug Act of 1906 is cited by drug policy reform advocates such as Jim Gray as a successful model for re-legalization of currently prohibited drugs by requiring accurate labels, monitoring of purity and dose, and consumer education.
